= 1993 in Wales =

- Centuries: 18th; 19th; 20th; 21st
- Decades: 1970s; 1980s; 1990s; 2000s; 2010s
- See also: List of years in Wales; Timeline of Welsh history 1993 in The United Kingdom England Scotland Elsewhere

This article is about the particular significance of the year 1993 to Wales and its people.

== Incumbents ==
- Secretary of State for Wales – David Hunt (until 27 May); John Redwood
- Archbishop of Wales – Alwyn Rice Jones, Bishop of St Asaph
- Archdruid of the National Eisteddfod of Wales – John Gwilym Jones

== Events ==
- 13 January - Wayne Edwards from Cefn Mawr is the first British soldier killed in the Bosnian War.
- April – Childline Wales is launched by George Thomas, Viscount Tonypandy.
- 11 June
  - Five hundred homes in Llandudno are damaged by flash floods, and 2500 people are evacuated.
  - Welsh-born Dr John Savage becomes prime minister of Nova Scotia.
  - John Redwood, recently appointed Secretary of State for Wales, attracts ridicule after being filmed attempting to mime to the Welsh national anthem at the Welsh Conservative Party conference, when he clearly did not know the words.
- 20 August - Closure of the Royal Navy Propellant Factory, Caerwent.
- 21 October - The Welsh Language Act receives Royal Assent, placing Welsh on an equal footing with English within the public sector in Wales.
- 31 December – Terry Yorath is sacked after five years as manager of the Wales national football team.
- The University of Wales celebrates its centenary.
- The government announces the privatisation of DVOIT, the former IT arm of the Driver and Vehicle Licensing Agency, Swansea's biggest employer. DVLA contracts for the provision of IT services are let to EDS.
- Laura Tenison sets up the maternity and babywear retailer JoJo Maman Bébé in Newport.

== Arts and literature ==
=== Awards ===
- National Eisteddfod of Wales (held in Llanelwedd)
- National Eisteddfod of Wales: Chair – Meirion MacIntyre Huws, "Gwawr"
- National Eisteddfod of Wales: Crown – Eirwyn George
- National Eisteddfod of Wales: Prose Medal – Mihangel Morgan, Dirgel Ddyn
- Gwobr Goffa Daniel Owen – Endaf Jones, Mewn Cornel Fechan Fach
- Wales Book of the Year:
  - English language: Robert Minhinnick – Watching the Fire Eater
  - Welsh language: Robin Llywelyn – Seren Wen ar Gefndir Gwyn

=== New books ===
==== English language ====
- Thomas Charles-Edwards – Early Irish and Welsh Kinship
- Gillian Clarke – The King of Britain's Daughter
- Janet Davies – The Welsh Language
- John Davies – A History of Wales
- Glenys Kinnock & Fiona Millar – By Faith and Daring
- Saunders Lewis – Selected Poems
- Phil Rickman – Crybbe

==== Welsh language ====
- Geraint Bowen – O Groth y Ddaear (autobiography)
- Moses Glyn Jones – Y Dewin a cherddi eraill
- Mihangel Morgan - Saith Pechod Marwol

=== Music ===
- Psychedelic rock band Super Furry Animals is formed in Cardiff.
- The Hennessys – Caneuon Cynnar
- Siân James – Distaw
- Michael Jones – Rouge
- John Pickard – String Quartet no. 2
- Meic Stevens – Er Cof Am Blant Y Cwm (album)

== Film ==
- Anthony Hopkins plays C. S. Lewis in the film version of Shadowlands.

=== Welsh-language films ===
- Tân ar y Comin

== Broadcasting ==
- 1 January – S4C becomes responsible for selling its own advertising air time.
- 16 December – Tim Vincent becomes Blue Peter's first Welsh presenter.

=== Welsh-language television ===
- Dafydd
- Delweddau Zimbabwe, presented by Iwan Bala

=== English-language television ===
- Paul Rhys and Michael Sheen star in Gallowglass.
- The Slate (arts programme)

== Sport ==
- BBC Wales Sports Personality of the Year – Colin Jackson
- Football – The Wales national football team achieves its highest ever FIFA ranking (27).
- Golf – Wales wins the European Amateur Men's Team Championship in the Czech Republic.
- Rowing – The Celtic Challenge becomes a regular (biennial) event.

== Births ==
- 22 January
  - Ben Lake, Plaid Cymru, MP
  - Tom Price, rugby player
- 13 February – Sophie Evans, singer and actress
- 1 March – Gwion Edwards, footballer
- 10 March – Tom Davies, rugby player
- 21 March – Jade Jones, taekwondo competitor
- 4 April – Cerys Hale, rugby player
- 24 April – Ben Davies, footballer
- 2 May – Owain Doull, cyclist
- 5 May – Rhodri Williams, rugby player
- 26 June – Jodie Grinham, Paralympic archer
- 29 June – Jak Jones, snooker player
- 2 August – Gareth Thomas, rugby player
- 20 September – Jordan Williams, rugby player
- 6 October – Sam Davies, rugby player
- 3 November – Josh Griffiths, marathon runner
- 24 November – Chelsea Lewis, netball player
- 26 November – Rhodri Hughes, rugby player
- 27 November – Sion Bennett, rugby player
- 31 December – Dave Richards, footballer

== Deaths ==
- 30 January – Dorothy Miles, poet and deaf activist, 61 (suicide)
- 27 January – R. H. Williams, rugby player, 62
- 10 March – Bill Price, physicist, 83
- 7 April – Terry Price, rugby player, 47
- 21 April – Lyn Thomas, footballer, 72
- 23 April – Daniel Jones, composer, 80
- 21 May – Cliff Tucker, politician and benefactor of the University of Wales, Lampeter, 80
- 27 May
  - Dennis Powell, boxer, 68
  - Trevor Thomas, art historian, 85
- 30 May – Mel Rees, footballer, 26
- 29 July – Gwilym R. Jones, editor and poet, 90
- 20 August – Iorwerth Hughes, Wales football international goalkeeper, 68
- 4 September – Haydn Davies, cricketer, 81
- 2 October – John James, historical novelist, 69
- October – Ivor Griffiths, footballer, 75
- 17 November – Gordon Richards, footballer, 60
- 30 November – Wogan Philipps, 2nd Baron Milford, politician, 91
- 1 December – Lynette Davies, actress, 45
- 4 December – Roy Vernon, footballer, 56
- 10 December – Roland Davies, comic book artist and animator, 89
- 13 December – Francis Jones, herald, 85
- 19 December – Owain Owain, novelist, short story writer and poet, 64
- date unknown
  - T. Rees Thomas, Congregationalist minister, 82/3
  - Rheinallt Nantlais Williams, philosopher of religion and college principal, 81/2

== See also ==
- 1993 in Northern Ireland
