= 1996 in Wales =

- Centuries: 18th; 19th; 20th; 21st
- Decades: 1970s; 1980s; 1990s; 2000s; 2010s
- See also: List of years in Wales; Timeline of Welsh history 1996 in The United Kingdom England Scotland Elsewhere

This article is about the particular significance of the year 1996 to Wales and its people.

== Incumbents ==
- Secretary of State for Wales – William Hague
- Archbishop of Wales – Alwyn Rice Jones, Bishop of St Asaph
- Archdruid of the National Eisteddfod of Wales
  - John Gwilym Jones (outgoing)
  - Dafydd Rowlands (incoming)

== Events ==
- 1 January - Michael German is awarded the OBE for his public and political service.
- 15 February - The Sea Empress, an oil tanker, runs aground off Milford Haven, causing devastation to the west Wales coastline.
- 1 April - The Local Government (Wales) Act 1994 comes into force, creating 22 unitary authorities.
- 3 April - The first EuroHowl is held in Aberystwyth, Wales.
- 29 June - The Prince's Trust concert in Hyde Park, London is attended by 150,000 people.
- 18 July - Howard Hughes is sentenced to life imprisonment at Chester Crown Court for the rape and murder of 7-year-old Sophie Hook at Llandudno 12 months previously. The trial judge recommends that Hughes, 31, should never be released.
- 28 August - The Prince and Princess of Wales, are formally divorced at the High Court of Justice in London, the first time in history that a Prince of Wales has successfully gone through a divorce. By negotiation, Her Royal Highness The Princess of Wales is restyled, Diana, Princess of Wales.
- November - The Owain Glyndŵr Society is founded.
- date unknown
  - The Church in Wales ordains its first women priests.
  - South Wales Constabulary changes its name to South Wales Police.

== Arts and literature ==
- Sir Anthony Hopkins opens the Cliff Tucker Theatre at the University of Wales, Lampeter.
- Alice Thomas Ellis is dismissed as a columnist on the Catholic Herald newspaper because of her attack on the reputation of the late Archbishop Derek Worlock.
- Steve Balsamo stars in a West End revival of Jesus Christ Superstar.

=== Awards ===
- Glyndŵr Award - Jan Morris
- National Eisteddfod of Wales (held in Ffairfach, near Llandeilo)
- National Eisteddfod of Wales: Chair - R. O. Williams
- National Eisteddfod of Wales: Crown - David John Pritchard
- National Eisteddfod of Wales: Prose Medal - withheld
- Wales Book of the Year:
  - English language: Nigel Jenkins, Gwalia in Khasia
  - Welsh language:
- Gwobr Goffa Daniel Owen - Eirug Wyn, Smoc Gron Bach

=== New books ===
- Ron Berry - This Bygone
- Ruth Bidgood - The Fluent Moment
- Gillian Clarke - The Whispering Room
- Keith Kissack - The Lordship, Parish and Borough of Monmouth
- Howard Marks - Mr Nice
- Kenneth Morris - The Dragon Path
- Tim Rishton - Liturgisk orgelspill

== Film ==
- Prince Valiant filmed at Gwrych Castle.

== Music ==
- John Cale - Walking on Locusts
- Peter Maxwell Davies - The Doctor of Myddfai (opera)
- Gillian Elisa - Rhywbeth yn y Glas.
- Karl Jenkins - Diamond Music
- Donna Lewis - Now in a Minute
- Super Furry Animals - Fuzzy Logic.

== Broadcasting ==
- The Broadcasting Act 1996 changes the funding formula for S4C.

=== Welsh-language television ===
- Heno (Welsh-language news programme, broadcast until 2001 and returned in 2012).

=== English-language television ===
- Barry Welsh is Coming
- In the Blood, presented by Steve Jones

== Sport ==
- BBC Wales Sports Personality of the Year – Ryan Giggs
- Football
  - The Welsh Football Trust is founded.
  - Llansantffraid F.C. win the Welsh Cup and are offered sponsorship by Total Network Solutions.
- Snooker
  - Mark Williams wins the Welsh Open tournament in Cardiff.

== Births ==
- 25 February - Laura Halford, rhythmic gymnast
- 25 April - Kizzy Crawford, Bajan-Welsh folk-pop crossover singer-songwriter
- 17 May - Seb Davies, rugby player
- 25 July - Jarrod Evans, rugby player
- 1 August - Gemma Evans, footballer
- 14 September - Shaun Evans, rugby player
- 2 October - Keston Davies, footballer
- 28 November - Owen Evans, footballer

== Deaths ==
- 16 January - Dai Ward, footballer, 61
- 7 March - Aled Eames, historian, 74
- 11 March - Sir Granville Beynon, physicist, 81
- 14 March - Dewi Bebb, Wales rugby union player, 57
- 16 March - Harry Peacock, Wales rugby union player, 87
- 14 April - Mervyn Levy, artist and critic, 81
- 7 May - Taffy Williams, soldier, 62
- 27 July - Billy Rees, footballer, 72
- 29 August - Dillwyn Thomas, cricketer, 91
- 5 September - Clem Thomas, rugby player, 67
- 24 September - I. E. S. Edwards, Egyptologist, 87
- 26 October - Huw Owen, theologian and academic, 69
- 10 November - Dafydd Orwig, politician and academic, 68
- 9 December
  - Diana Morgan, playwright and screenwriter, 86
  - Ivor Roberts-Jones, sculptor, 83
- 29 December - Pennar Davies, poet and theologian, 85
- date unknown
  - Thomas Nathaniel Davies, artist and teacher
  - Thomas David Frank Evans, WWII prisoner-of-war
  - Harry Hanford, footballer, 88
  - Thyrza Anne Leyshon, painter, 103

== See also ==
- 1996 in Northern Ireland
