= 1991 in Wales =

- Centuries: 18th; 19th; 20th; 21st
- Decades: 1970s; 1980s; 1990s; 2000s; 2010s
- See also: List of years in Wales; Timeline of Welsh history 1991 in The United Kingdom England Scotland Elsewhere

This article is about the particular significance of the year 1991 to Wales and its people.

== Incumbents ==
- Secretary of State for Wales – David Hunt
- Archbishop of Wales
  - George Noakes, Bishop of St David's (retired)
  - Alwyn Rice Jones, Bishop of St Asaph
- Archdruid of the National Eisteddfod of Wales – Ap Llysor

== Events ==
- 6 January - A Maltese tanker, the Kimya, capsizes off the Anglesey coast. Ten crew members are drowned, and the ship's cargo of sunflower oil causes marine pollution.
- January - Two Welsh soldiers are among those killed in the first Gulf War.
- 4 April - Peter Hain is elected as MP for Neath in a by-election caused by the death of the sitting MP, Donald Coleman.
- 16 May - Huw Edwards is elected as MP for Monmouth in a by-election caused by the death of the sitting MP, Sir John Stradling Thomas.
- 23 May - A memorial to Gwenllian ferch Gruffydd is dedicated at Kidwelly Castle.
- 19 July - Dean Saunders, 27-year-old Welsh international striker, becomes the most expensive player to be signed by a British club when a £2.9 million fee takes him from Derby County to Liverpool, who have broken the record fee in British football for the third time in four years.
- 31 August–3 September - Cardiff Ely Bread Riots: A dispute between two shopkeepers escalates into four consecutive nights of rioting in the Ely district of Cardiff.
- 16 October - Manchester United winger Ryan Giggs, who turns 18 at the end of the following month, becomes the youngest full international for the Welsh national team against Germany in Nuremberg.
- 21 October - Welshman Eric Jones is one of a team of four who make the first hot-air balloon flight over Mount Everest.
- 25 October - Official opening of Conwy Crossing (immersed tube tunnel) to road traffic as part of A55 Conwy Bypass.
- 8 November - Penallta Colliery closes.
- date unknown - The Welsh Office proposes an M4 relief road between Magor and Castleton.

== Arts and literature ==
- August - Simultaneous translation facilities are made available for the first time at the National Eisteddfod of Wales.
- 1 September - Cantorion Colin Jones is founded in Wrexham.
- The first Pacific Northwest Welsh Weekend is held at Seattle.
- Wyn Calvin becomes the first Welshman to be elected King Rat of the Order of Water Rats.

=== Awards ===
- National Eisteddfod of Wales (held in Mold, with record attendance of 164,100)
- National Eisteddfod of Wales: Chair - Robin Llwyd ab Owain, "Merch Ein Amserau" (The Girl of Our Times)
- National Eisteddfod of Wales: Crown - Einir Jones, "Pelydrau"
- National Eisteddfod of Wales: Prose Medal - Angharad Tomos, Si Hei Lwli
- Gwobr Goffa Daniel Owen - withheld

=== New books ===
==== English language ====
- A Cardiff Anthology
- Phil Rickman - Candlenight

==== Welsh language ====
- Robat Arwyn & Robin Llwyd ab Owain - Gwin Beaujolais
- Pennar Davies - Gwas y Gwaredwr
- Glyn Tegai Hughes - Daniel Owen a Natur y Nofel
- Saunders Lewis - Williams Pantycelyn (new ed.)
- Prys Morgan - Brad y Llyfrau Gleision

=== Music ===
- Datblygu - Blwch Tymer Tymor
- Y Cyrff - Llawenydd Heb Ddiwedd (album)
- Bonnie Tyler - Bitterblue (album)

== Film ==
=== Welsh-language films ===
- Elenya
- Un Nos Ola Leuad

== Broadcasting ==
=== English-language television ===
- Joshua Jones (children's programme made by S4C)
- Catherine Zeta-Jones makes her first appearance in The Darling Buds of May.

=== Welsh-language television ===
- Gemau Heb Ffiniau

== Sport ==
- BBC Wales Sports Personality of the Year – Ian Woosnam
- Football
  - 5 June - Wales defeat Germany in the UEFA Euro 1992 qualifying tournament.
- Golf - Ian Woosnam wins the US Masters at Augusta, Georgia, becoming the first Welshman to win a major tournament.
- Rugby union - Neil Jenkins plays his first rugby match for Wales, at the age of 19.

== Births ==
- 21 January - Craig Roberts, actor
- 28 January - Ffion Bowen, rugby union winger
- 3 February - Adrian Quaife-Hobbs, racing driver
- 4 February - Fred Evans, boxer
- 28 March - David Cornell, footballer
- 12 April - Ashley Jazz Richards, footballer
- 24 May - Aled Davies, paralympian field athlete (throwing events)
- 5 July - Michael White, snooker player
- 10 August - Amy Dowden, dancer
- 23 August - Laura O'Sullivan, footballer (goalkeeper)
- 3 October - Jenny McLoughlin, athlete
- 20 October - Nathaniel Jarvis, footballer
- 29 November - Becky James, track racing cyclist

== Deaths ==
- 14 January - Donald Coleman, politician, 65
- 30 January - Rhys Lloyd, Baron Lloyd of Kilgerran, politician, 83
- 10 February - Rowe Harding, rugby player, 89
- 19 February - Tom Rees, Wales international rugby player, 77
- 18 March - Robert Roland Hughes, neurologist, 79/80
- 24 March - Maudie Edwards, actress and singer, 84
- 29 March - John Stradling Thomas, politician, 65
- July - Evan Roberts, conservationist
- 12 August - Edward George Bowen, CBE, physicist, 80
- 23 August - Innes Lloyd, TV producer, 66
- 26 August - John Petts, artist, 77
- 31 August - Idwal Rees, Wales rugby union captain, 81
- October - Seymour Morris, footballer, 78
- 13 October - Donald Houston, actor, 67
- 5 November - Gwenlyn Parry, dramatist, 59
- 15 December - Ray Smith, actor, 55
- 22 December - Jim Lang, Wales rugby union player, 82

== See also ==
- 1991 in Northern Ireland
