= 1992 in Scotland =

- Centuries: 18th; 19th; 20th; 21st
- Decades: 1970s; 1980s; 1990s; 2000s; 2010s
- See also: List of years in Scotland; Timeline of Scottish history 1992 in: The UK • England • Wales • Elsewhere; Scottish football: 1991–92 • 1992–93; 1992 in Scottish television

Events from the year 1992 in Scotland.

== Incumbents ==
- Secretary of State for Scotland and Keeper of the Great Seal – Ian Lang

=== Law officers ===
- Lord Advocate – Lord Fraser of Carmyllie; then Alan Rodger, Baron Rodger of Earlsferry
- Solicitor General for Scotland – Alan Rodger; then Thomas Dawson

=== Judiciary ===
- Lord President of the Court of Session and Lord Justice General – Lord Hope
- Lord Justice Clerk – Lord Ross
- Chairman of the Scottish Land Court – Lord Elliott, then Lord Philip

== Events ==
- 1 January – New Year's Day Storm sweeps across northern Scotland and western Norway. The original Bridge of Awe collapses.
- 6 March – the Local Government Finance Act 1992, which will replace the Poll Tax with the Council Tax from April next year, receives royal assent.
- 9 April – The 1992 general election results in Labour winning 49 out of 72 seats in Scotland- a clear majority. However, the Conservative Party now led by Prime Minister John Major, with only eleven MPs in Scotland; wins a fourth consecutive term in government.
- 9 May – Rangers F.C. beat Airdrieonians 2-1 to win the Scottish Cup, having already won their fourth consecutive league title.
- June
  - University status granted to Napier University, The Robert Gordon University and the University of Paisley.
  - United States Navy Submarine Squadron 14 leaves Holy Loch.
  - Miller oilfield in the North Sea begins production.
- 24 June – Ravenscraig steelworks, the largest hot strip steel mill in Western Europe, closes, ending steelmaking in Scotland.
- 17 July – John Smith, MP for Monklands East, is elected as Leader of the Labour Party following the resignation of Neil Kinnock after 9 years in the role.
- 6 August – Lord Hope, the Lord President of the Court of Session, Scotland's most senior judge, permits the televising of appeals in both criminal and civil cases, the first time that cameras have been allowed into courts in the United Kingdom.
- 7–12 December – The 1992 European Curling Championships take place in Perth.

=== Undated ===
- University of the Highlands and Islands established as a Millennium Institute.
- University of St Andrews appoints its first female professor, Ursula Martin as Professor of Computer Science.
- Monktonhall Colliery at Newcraighall becomes a worker cooperative.
- Publication of The Third Statistical Account of Scotland concludes with the volume for Roxburghshire.
- The Cadenza choir is formed in Edinburgh.

== Births ==
- 23 March – Blair Alston, footballer
- 30 March – Stuart Armstrong, footballer
- 21 May – Lisa Evans, footballer
- 21 June – Carly Booth, golfer
- 23 August – Nicola Docherty, footballer
- 17 September – Stuart Bannigan, footballer

== Deaths ==
- 4 May – Gregor Mackenzie, Labour politician (born 1927)
- 27 June – Bessie Watson, child suffragette and piper (born 1900)
- 23 August – Donald Stewart, Scottish National Party politician (born 1920)

== The arts ==
- March – Duncan McLean's short story collection Bucket of Tongues is published.
- August – Scottish Television begins the Gaelic language soap opera Machair, set and filmed on Lewis.
- 10 August – James MacMillan's concerto for percussion and orchestra Veni, Veni, Emmanuel, commissioned by Christian Salvesen for Evelyn Glennie is premiered by her with the Scottish Chamber Orchestra at The Proms in the Royal Albert Hall, London.
- Alasdair Gray's novel Poor Things is published.
- Andrew Greig's novel Electric Brae is published.
- Rebel Inc. is first published as a counter-cultural literary magazine in Edinburgh by Kevin Williamson.
- Birlinn (publisher) established in Edinburgh.

== See also ==
- 1992 in Northern Ireland
