= 1992 in England =

- Centuries: 18th; 19th; 20th; 21st
- Decades: 1970s; 1980s; 1990s; 2000s; 2010s
- See also: 1991–92 in English football 1992–93 in English football 1992 in the United Kingdom; Other events of 1992

Events from 1992 in England

== Incumbent ==
- Monarch - Elizabeth II
- Prime Minister - John Major

== Events ==
=== January ===
- 9 January - Alison Halford, an assistant chief constable with Merseyside Police Force and the country's most senior policewoman, is suspended from duty for a second time following a police authority meeting.
- 22 January - Estate agent Stephanie Slater, 25, is held hostage at a Birmingham house by a man demanding a £175,000 ransom from her employers. He has threatened to kill Ms Slater unless he receives the money.
- 30 January - Stephanie Slater is safely returned to her family after her captor releases her from his car near her home in Birmingham.

=== February ===
- 5 February - Kevin Keegan, the former Liverpool F.C. and England striker, is appointed manager of Newcastle United.
- 20 February
  - The Football Association launches the new Premier League which will begin in August, at the start of the next football season. Its founder members will be the teams finishing in the top 19 of this season's Football League First Division as well as the Second Division champions, runners-up and playoff winners.
  - Michael Sams is arrested on suspicion of abducting Stephanie Slater as well as murdering prostitute Julie Dart in Leeds seven months ago.

=== March ===
- 13 March - The first ecumenical church in Britain, the Christ the Cornerstone Church in Milton Keynes is opened.
- 25 March - Aldershot Football Club, bottom of the Football League, go out of business after a two-year financial crisis that saw them unable to pay off hundreds of thousands of pounds of debts. The club was founded in 1926 and had been members of the Football League since 1932.
- 26 March - Television entertainer Roy Castle (59), who currently presents Record Breakers, announces that he is suffering from lung cancer.
- 29 March - John Spencer, 8th Earl Spencer and father of Princess Diana, dies suddenly from pneumonia at the age of 68.

=== April ===
- 3 April - Gary Lineker, who is due to leave Tottenham Hotspur at the end of this season and join Grampus Eight of Japan, is voted FWA Player of the Year.
- 10 April - Provisional Irish Republican Army detonates two bombs at the Baltic Exchange in central London, killing three.
- 12 April - Manchester United win the Football League Cup for the first time in their history with a 1–0 win over Nottingham Forest at Wembley Stadium in which Brian McClair scores the only goal of the game.
- 17–20 April - Lost Gardens of Heligan in Cornwall first opened to the public.
- 20 April - The Freddie Mercury Tribute Concert takes place at Wembley Stadium in London.
- 26 April - Leeds United are confirmed champions of the Football League First Division (which becomes the FA Premier League next season) as they defeat Sheffield United 3–2, while their nearest rivals Manchester United lose 2–0 at Liverpool, who will also collect silverware for this season if they win the FA Cup final on 9 May.
- 27 April - Betty Boothroyd, 62-year-old Labour MP for West Bromwich West in the West Midlands, is elected as Speaker of the House of Commons, the first woman to hold the position.

=== May ===
- 9 May - Liverpool F.C. win the FA Cup for the fifth time with a 2–0 win over Sunderland in the final at Wembley Stadium. Ian Rush scores his fifth goal in an FA Cup final for Liverpool (having scored twice in the 1986 and 1989 finals) and the other goal comes from Michael Thomas. It is their first major trophy under the management of Graeme Souness, who was appointed just over a year ago.
- 12 May - Plans are unveiled for a fifth terminal at Heathrow Airport, which is now the busiest airport in the world.
- 22 May - Stephen Owen is cleared of attempted murder at Maidstone Crown Court, six months after shooting Kevin Taylor, the lorry driver who had caused his son's death while under the influence of alcohol in 1988.
- 25 May - Blackburn Rovers, owned by steel baron Jack Walker and managed by the Liverpool legend Kenny Dalglish, defeat Leicester City 1–0 in the Second Division playoff final at Wembley Stadium to seal a place in the new FA Premier League and end a 26-year exile from the top division of English football.
- 28 May - David Platt, the England midfielder who joined Bari from Aston Villa last year, becomes the most expensive British player when an £8 million move sees him join Juventus.

=== June ===
- 11 June - The England national football team begin their European Championships campaign in Sweden with a goalless draw against Denmark in Malmö.
- 14 June - England draw 0–0 with France in Malmö, meaning that they have to defeat host nation Sweden in their final group game if they are to qualify for the semi-finals.
- 17 June - There is disappointment for the England football team whose 2–1 defeat against Sweden ends their hopes of reaching the semi-finals of the European Championships. It is the last international appearance for Gary Lineker, the 31-year-old England striker who has scored 48 goals in his career - one short of the record set by Bobby Charlton more than 20 years ago.
- 26 June - Despite England's dismal performance at the European Championships, there is joy for an English-based footballer at the final of the competition as Denmark triumph 2–0 against Germany with Manchester United's Peter Schmeichel in goal. Also in the line-up is former Manchester United defender John Sivebaek (now playing France), while one of Denmark's goals was scored by midfielder John Jensen who is reportedly a transfer target for English club Arsenal.

=== July ===
- 17 July - Official opening of Manchester Metrolink.
- 23 July - 62 people are arrested in connection with rioting in Blackburn, Burnley and Huddersfield.
- 27 July - Alan Shearer becomes Britain's most expensive footballer in a £3.6 million transfer from Southampton to Blackburn Rovers. Shearer, who turns 22 next month, was a member of England's Euro 92 national squad, having scored on his debut in a friendly international against France earlier this year.

=== August ===
- 15 August - The first Premier League football matches are played. Brian Deane of Sheffield United is the scorer of the first Premier League goal. Meanwhile, financially troubled Division Three side Maidstone United have their first game of the season cancelled and are given 48 hours to guarantee that they will be able to fulfill this season's fixtures.
- 17 August - Maidstone United resign from the Football League after the club's directors gave up hope of being able to fulfill this season's fixtures. They only joined the Football League three years ago.

=== September ===
- 24 September - David Mellor, MP for Putney, resigns as Heritage Minister amid tabloid press speculation that he had been conducting an adulterous affair with actress Antonia de Sancha.

=== October ===
- 9 October - Two suspected IRA bombs explode in London, but there are no injuries.
- 12 October - Several people are injured when an IRA bomb explodes in the men's toilets at the Sussex Arms pub in Covent Garden, London. Among the injured is 30-year-old nurse, David Heffer, who later dies in hospital.
- 14 October - The England football team begins its qualification campaign for the 1994 FIFA World Cup with a 1–1 draw against Norway at Wembley Stadium.
- 25 October - Around 100,000 people protest in London against the government's pit closure plans.
- 30 October - IRA terrorists force a taxi driver to drive to Downing Street at gunpoint and once there they detonate a bomb, but there are no injuries.

=== November ===
- 11 November - The Church of England votes to allow women to become priests.
- 17 November - Vinnie Jones, the Wimbledon midfielder, receives a record £20,000 fine and a six-month suspension (the latter suspended for three years) for bringing the game into disrepute following his comments in the video "Soccer's Hard Men".
- 16 November - Hoxne Hoard discovered by metal detectorist Eric Lawes in Suffolk.
- 19 November - The High Court rules that doctors can disconnect feeding tubes from Tony Bland, a 21-year-old man who has been in a coma since the Hillsborough disaster on 15 April 1989. Mr Bland, of Liverpool, suffered massive brain damage in the disaster which claimed the lives of 95 people and doctors treating him say that there is no reasonable possibility that he could recover consciousness and in his current condition would be unlikely to survive more than five years.
- 20 November - Fire breaks out in Windsor Castle, badly damaging the castle and causing over £50 million worth of damage.

=== December ===
- 3 December - 65 people are injured by an IRA bomb in Manchester city centre but there are no fatalities.
- 8 December - A Mandir in West Bromwich is destroyed in an arson attack, while one in Birmingham and another in Coventry is damaged. Police fear that anti-Hindu violence by Islamic extremists is spilling into the country.
- 16 December - Four people are injured by IRA bombs in Oxford Street, London.

== Births ==
- 5 January - Moin Ashraf, cricketer
- 23 January - Charlotte Aiken, ice dancer
- 17 March – John Boyega, actor
- 21 March - Sophie Allen, swimmer
- 10 April – Daisy Ridley, actress
- 15 April - Aaron Wildig, footballer
- 1 May
  - Sammy Ameobi, footballer
  - James Hasson, English-Australian rugby league player
- 6 May - Alex Barrow, cricketer
- 17 June - Ryan Allsop, footballer
- 22 July - Reece Jones, footballer
- 17 August - Saraya Bevis, pro wrestler
- 29 August - Richard Barroilhet, footballer
- 4 September - Zerkaa, YouTuber
- 11 September - Jonathan Adams, athlete
- 16 September - George Bacon, cricketer
- 21 September - Ollie Banks, footballer
- 8 October - Callum Ball, footballer
- 22 October - 21 Savage, rapper
- 13 November - Tom Ailes, rugby union player
- 15 December - Jason Banton, footballer
- 21 December - Alex Arnold, actor
- 28 December - Shozair Ali, cricketer

== Deaths ==
- 20 April - Benny Hill, comedian and actor

== See also ==
- 1992 in Northern Ireland
- 1992 in Scotland
- 1992 in Wales
