= 1994 in Wales =

- Centuries: 18th; 19th; 20th; 21st
- Decades: 1970s; 1980s; 1990s; 2000s; 2010s
- See also: List of years in Wales; Timeline of Welsh history 1994 in The United Kingdom England Scotland Elsewhere

This article is about the particular significance of the year 1994 to Wales and its people.

== Incumbents ==
- Secretary of State for Wales – John Redwood
- Archbishop of Wales – Alwyn Rice Jones, Bishop of St Asaph
- Archdruid of the National Eisteddfod of Wales – John Gwilym Jones

== Events ==
- 26 January – A man fires two blank shots at the Prince of Wales (now Charles III), during the prince's visit to Sydney, Australia.
- 10 February – An earthquake shock measuring 2.9 on the Richter scale is experienced within a 50-mile radius of the epicentre near Bangor, Wales.
- 18 March – An earthquake shock measuring 3.1 on the Richter scale is experienced within a 30-mile radius of the epicentre near Newtown, Montgomeryshire.
- 1 April – At Coney Beach Pleasure Park, Porthcawl, a 9-year-old boy is killed after being flung off the 58-year-old "Water Chute" ride when a steel hoop collapses in wet and windy conditions and falls onto the open-topped carriage in which he is travelling.
- 29 June – In a televised interview with Jonathan Dimbleby, the Prince of Wales admits having committed adultery after the breakdown of his marriage.
- 19 July – Glenys Kinnock is elected to the European Parliament.
- 24 July – Explosion at Pembroke Refinery injures 26.
- 28 August – Sunday trading becomes legal in England and Wales for the first time.
- 10 September – Bryn Terfel is guest soloist at the Last Night of the Proms in London.
- Dr Elizabeth Haywood is the first winner of the Welsh Woman of the Year award.
- Miners at the Tower Colliery in South Wales, led by Tyrone O'Sullivan, set up TEBO (Tower Employees Buy-Out) to try to save their mine.
- Work begins on the Cardiff Bay barrage.
- St Davids (population 2,000) is restored to city status in the United Kingdom at the request of the Queen, confirmed by letters patent presented on 1 June 1995.

== Arts and literature ==
- Foundation of the Harlech Biennale visual arts festival.

=== Awards ===
- National Eisteddfod of Wales (held in Neath)
- National Eisteddfod of Wales: Chair – Emyr Lewis, "Chwyldro"
- National Eisteddfod of Wales: Crown – Gerwyn Williams, "Dolenni"
- National Eisteddfod of Wales: Prose Medal – Robin Llywelyn, O'r Harbwr Gwag i'r Cefnfor Gwyn
- Gwobr Goffa Daniel Owen - Eirug Wyn
- Wales Book of the Year:
  - English language: Paul Ferris, Caitlin
  - Welsh language: Robin Chapman, W. J. Gruffydd
- Aventis Prize – Steve Jones, The Language of the Genes
- Glyndŵr Award – Ian Parrott (composer)

=== New books ===
==== English language ====
- John Davies – A History of Wales
- Jonathan Dimbleby – The Prince of Wales: a Biography
- Mike Jenkins – Graffiti Narratives
- John May – Reference Wales
- Jenny Rees – Looking for Mr Nobody; The Secret Life of Goronwy Rees

==== Welsh language ====
- Donald Evans – Wrth Reddf
- Bobi Jones – Crist a Chenedlaetholdeb (Christ and Nationalism)
- Esyllt T. Lawrence - Cyn y Wawr
- Mihangel Morgan - Te Gyda'r Frenhines

=== New music ===
- Gorky's Zygotic Mynci - Tatay (album)
- Karl Jenkins - Adiemus: Songs of Sanctuary

== Film ==
- Keith Allen plays the mysterious lodger in Shallow Grave.

=== Welsh-language films ===
- Branwen (Ceri Sherlock)
- Hedd Wyn
- Tân ar y Comin (premièred 1 January on S4C television)
- Ymadawiad Arthur

== Music ==
- John Cale performs a spoken-word duet with Suzanne Vega on the song "The Long Voyage" on Hector Zazou's album Chansons des mers froides.
- Shakin' Stevens gives up recording.

=== Albums ===
- Bryn Fôn – Dyddiau Di-gymar
- Dafydd Iwan – Caneuon Gwerin

== Broadcasting ==
=== Welsh-language television ===
- Gogs (animation)
- Gwalia yng Nghasia (documentary)
- Yr Heliwr ("A Mind to Kill") (drama)
- Pengelli
- Uned 5 (children's)

=== English-language television ===
- Wales Tonight (HTV)

== Sport ==
- BBC Wales Sports Personality of the Year – Steve Robinson
- Commonwealth Games – The Wales team wins a total of 19 medals, including five golds (Colin Jackson, 110m hurdles; Neil Winter, pole vault; Michael Jay, rapid-fire pistol; David Morgan, middleweight weightlifting snatch and overall middleweight title).
- Football – Vinnie Jones is chosen to captain the Wales international side.
- Golf – Ian Woosnam wins the British Masters tournament.

== Births ==
- 7 February – Nathan Walker, Welsh-Australian ice hockey player
- 30 June – Rhys Jones, sprinter
- 2 July – Jessica Leigh Jones, engineer
- 7 September – Elinor Barker, cyclist
- 6 October – Joe Woolford, singer
- date unknown – Rhys Morgan, health blogger

== Deaths ==
- 1 January – Allen Forward, Wales international rugby union player, 72
- 23 March – Donald Swann, musician, 70
- 30 April – Herbert Bowden, Baron Aylestone, politician, 89
- 21 May – Cliff Wilson, snooker player, 60
- 31 May – Tom Lewis, Wales international rugby union player, 89
- 27 June – Jeremy Brooks, novelist, poet and dramatist, 67
- 24 July – Aubrey Davies, cricketer, 79
- 29 July – William Mathias, composer, 57
- 31 July – Caitlin Macnamara, widow of Dylan Thomas, 80
- 23 August – Wat Jones, cricketer, 77
- 1 September – Dr Roger Thomas, politician, 68
- 4 October – F. Gwendolen Rees, zoologist, 88
- 9 October – Idris Hopkins, footballer, 83
- 17 October – Gus Risman, rugby league player, 83
- 28 October – Steve Curtis, boxer, 45
- 6 December – Alun Owen, screenwriter, 69
- 12 December – Stuart Evans, writer, 60
- 29 December – Jack Rippon, cricketer, 76
- 31 December – Harri Webb, poet, 74
- date unknown
  - Colin Edwards, writer, 69/70
  - Elisabeth Inglis-Jones, writer, 93/4

== See also ==
- 1994 in Northern Ireland
