= 1987 in England =

- Centuries: 18th; 19th; 20th; 21st
- Decades: 1960s; 1970s; 1980s; 1990s; 2000s
- See also: 1986–87 in English football 1987–88 in English football 1987 in the United Kingdom; Other events of 1987

Events from 1987 in England.

== Incumbent ==
- Monarch – Elizabeth II
- Prime Minister – Margaret Thatcher

== Events ==
- 31 August – Docklands Light Railway is formally opened by the Queen and Prince Philip.

== Births ==
- 6 January – Gemma Gibbons, judoka
- 8 January – Cynthia Erivo, actress and singer
- 11 March – Jordan Page, rugby union player
- 1 June – Billy Beechers, footballer
- 27 June – Ed Westwick, actor and musician
- 29 August – Elliot Benyon, footballer
- 22 September – Tom Felton, actor and musician

== See also ==
- 1987 in Northern Ireland
- 1987 in Scotland
- 1987 in Wales
