= 1994 in England =

- Centuries: 18th; 19th; 20th; 21st
- Decades: 1970s; 1980s; 1990s; 2000s; 2010s
- See also: 1993–94 in English football 1994–95 in English football 1994 in the United Kingdom; Other events of 1994

Events from 1994 in England

== Incumbent ==
- Monarch - Elizabeth II
- Prime Minister - John Major

== Events ==
=== January ===
- 19 January – Privatisation of London Buses begins with the first sale of a bus operating subsidiary, Westlink (Stanwell Buses Ltd), in a management buyout.
- 28 January – The Football Association's two-month search for a new England national football team manager ends with the appointment of former Tottenham Hotspur manager Terry Venables as national coach.
- 29 January – Graeme Souness resigns after nearly three years as manager of Liverpool F.C. to be replaced by club coach Roy Evans.

=== February ===
- 7 February – Stephen Milligan, Conservative MP for Eastleigh in Hampshire, is found dead at his home in Chiswick, West London. Police describe his death as "suspicious"
- 10 February – Three men are jailed in connection with the IRA bombings of Warrington gasworks 11 months ago. Pairic MacFhloinn is jailed for 35 years, Denis Kinsella for 25 years and John Kinsella for 20 years.
- 11 February – Forensic tests reveal that MP Stephen Milligan died of asphyxiation and that his death was probably the result of an auto-erotic sex practice.
- 24 February – Police in Gloucester begin excavations at 25 Cromwell Street, the home of 52-year-old builder Fred West.

=== March ===
- 1 March – Fred West is charged with the murders of three women who remains were found buried at his house. One of the bodies is believed to be that of his daughter Heather, who was last seen alive in 1987 at the age of 16.
- 8, 10 and 13 March – The IRA launch three successive mortar attacks on Heathrow Airport.
- 10 March – Following the recovery of further bodies at 25 Cromwell Street, Fred West is charged on eight counts of murder.
- 12 March – The Church of England ordains its first women priests, Angela Berners-Wilson being the first of all.
- 27 March – Aston Villa are Football League Cup winners for a record fifth time when they beat Manchester United 3–1 in the final at Wembley Stadium. It comes just three years after their manager Ron Atkinson achieved another final win in the competition over his old club with Manchester United, the previous one being while he was in charge of Sheffield Wednesday.
- 28 March – A masked man breaks into Hall Garth School, Middlesbrough, and stabs one pupil to death and wounds two others before being overpowered by teachers until the police arrive to arrest him. The dead girl is identified as 12-year-old Nikki Conroy. The man arrested is Stephen Wilkinson, a 29-year-old former pupil of the school.

=== April ===
- 6 April – The Football Association cancels England's friendly with Germany in Berlin on 20 April, as it coincides with what would have been Adolf Hitler's 105th birthday.
- 7 April – Paul Gascoigne, the England midfielder, breaks his leg while training for his club Lazio in Italy, and is set to be out action until at least this autumn.
- 10 April – Eric Cantona, the Manchester United and France striker, becomes the first foreign player to win the PFA Player of the Year award. His team draws 1–1 with Oldham Athletic in this afternoon's FA Cup semi-final at Wembley Stadium, but he misses the match as he is serving a five-match suspension after being sent off twice in successive games last month.

29 April Roland Ratzenbuger is killed during qualification for the San Marino Grand Prix

30 April Former world champion Ayrton Senna is killed after a 200 mph crash whilst leading the San Marino Grand Prix

=== May ===
- 1 May – Manchester United retain the Premier League football title with a 2–1 away win over Ipswich Town putting them beyond the reach of their last remaining challengers Blackburn Rovers.
- 14 May – Manchester United become only the sixth English football club (and the fourth this century) to have won the league title and FA Cup double as they triumph 4–0 over Chelsea in the FA Cup final.

=== June ===
- 10 June – Bobby Charlton, who scored a record 49 goals for the England team and won a European Cup with Manchester United, receives a knighthood.
- 13 June – The Conservatives suffer their worst election results this century, winning a mere 18 out of 87 of the nation's seats in the European parliament elections. The resurgent Labour Party, still without a leader as the search for a successor to the late John Smith continues, wins 62 seats.
- 14 June – In the heaviest penalty ever imposed on any English football club, Tottenham Hotspur are fined £600,000, deducted 12 league points from the start of next season, and banned from the FA Cup for a year due to financial irregularities which took place during the late 1980s.

=== July ===
- 4 July – Anthony Armstrong, 32, is charged with the murder of three-year-old Rosie Palmer, whose body was found today in a Hartlepool flat near where she went missing four days ago.
- 13 July – Chris Sutton, 21-year-old Norwich City striker, becomes Britain's most expensive footballer in a £5million move to Blackburn Rovers.
- 16 July – Abbie Humphries is recovered from a house near the Nottingham hospital from where she was snatched by a bogus nurse sixteen days ago when only four hours old. A 22-year-old woman is charged with abduction.
- 29 July – Tottenham Hotspur sign the Germany national football team striker Jürgen Klinsmann from French side AS Monaco for £2 million.
- 1 August – Norwich Central Library is destroyed in a fire.

=== August ===
- 2 August – Dick Best is dismissed as manager of the England national rugby team and succeeded by Jack Rowell.
- 13 August – Fifteen-year-old Richard Everitt is stabbed to death in London by a gang of British Bangladeshis in a racially motivated murder.
- 26 August – Papworth Hospital in Cambridgeshire carries out a pioneering operation to give a man a battery-operated heart.
- 28 August – Sunday trading becomes legal in England and Wales for the first time.

=== September ===
- 3 September – Billy Wright, former captain of Wolverhampton Wanderers and the England football team, dies of cancer aged 70.
- 21 September – Gary Lineker, 33, announces that he will retire from playing at the end of this year. Lineker, who scored 48 goals for the England team (one goal short of Bobby Charlton's record), has played for Nagoya Grampus Eight since leaving Tottenham Hotspur in May 1992. He will then return to England as a football pundit for the BBC.

=== October ===
- 21 October – A partially constructed tunnel carrying the Heathrow Express railway line into the Heathrow Airport terminal complex collapses.

=== December ===
- 13 December – Fred West is charged with the murders of twelve people who are believed to have died between 1967 and 1987, including his daughter Heather. His wife Rose is charged with ten of the murders, including that of Heather and her stepdaughter Charmaine, who is believed to have died in June 1971 at the age of eight.
- 14 December – Moors Murderer Myra Hindley receives a letter from the Home Office that informs her of former Home Secretary David Waddington's decision (taken four years earlier) that she will spend the rest of her life in prison. Hindley, 52, was involving in the torture and murder of five children during the 1960s with her lover Ian Brady. She was convicted of murdering two children at her 1966 trial as well as being an accessory to the murder of a third, but admitted two more murders in 1986 and subsequently helped police uncover the body of her fourth victim. On the same day, Brady is also informed that he will remain incarcerated for the rest of his natural life.

== Deaths ==
- 26 February – Olive Hirst, English advertising agent (b. 1912)
- 16 September – Harry Gilberg, English professional footballer (b. 1923)

== See also ==
- 1994 in Northern Ireland
- 1994 in Scotland
- 1994 in Wales
