= 1988 in Wales =

- Centuries: 18th; 19th; 20th; 21st
- Decades: 1960s; 1970s; 1980s; 1990s; 2000s
- See also: List of years in Wales; Timeline of Welsh history 1988 in The United Kingdom England Scotland Elsewhere

This article is about the particular significance of the year 1988 to Wales and its people.

== Incumbents ==
- Secretary of State for Wales – Peter Walker
- Archbishop of Wales – George Noakes, Bishop of St David's
- Archdruid of the National Eisteddfod of Wales – Emrys Deudraeth

== Events ==
- 14 February - Lynette White is murdered in her Cardiff flat. The case remains controversial for over 20 years, with Jeffrey Gafoor eventually being convicted in 2003.
- 26 March - The Welsh Ornithological Society is founded at Aberystwyth.
- October - County Hall, Cardiff, officially opened as the headquarters of South Glamorgan County Council beside the disused Bute East Dock in the Atlantic Wharf area of Butetown, Cardiff.
- 4 November - British Rail operates the last steam locomotives in its ownership (and its last narrow gauge trains) on the Vale of Rheidol Railway in regular service prior to its privatisation next year (Santa Specials run on 18 December).
- date unknown - The complete Bible translation into Welsh that has been in use since 1620 is replaced with a new version, Y Beibl Cymraeg Newydd (BCN), translated directly from the original languages.

== Arts and literature ==
- January - BAFTA Cymru is founded.
- 28–31 May - First Hay Festival of literature held in Hay-on-Wye.
- The Gregynog festival is re-launched by Anthony Rolfe Johnson.
- The European Centre for Traditional and Regional Cultures opens in Llangollen.
- Independent record label Ankst is formed at the University of Wales, Aberystwyth by Alun Llwyd, Gruffudd Jones and Emyr Glyn Williams.
- This year also sees the foundation of:
  - Ffilm Cymru (Film Foundation for Wales)
  - New Welsh Review

=== Awards ===
- National Eisteddfod of Wales (held in Newport)
- National Eisteddfod of Wales: Chair - Elwyn Edwards, "Storm"
- National Eisteddfod of Wales: Crown - T. James Jones, "Ffin"
- National Eisteddfod of Wales: Prose Medal - withheld

=== New books ===
==== English language ====
- Tony Conran - Blodeuwedd
- Hilary Llywelyn-Williams - The Tree Calendar
- Sheenagh Pugh - Beware Falling Tortoises
- Oliver Reynolds - The Player Queen's Wife
- Bernice Rubens - Our Father
- Glanmor Williams - Recovery, Reorientation and Reformation

==== Welsh language ====
- Idris Foster, Rachel Bromwich & D. Simon Evans (eds.), Culhwch ac Olwen
- Bobi Jones - Llenyddiaeth Gymraeg 1902-36
- Rhiannon Davies Jones - Cribau Eryri
- Manon Rhys - Cwtsho
- Wiliam Owen Roberts - Y Pla
- Huw Walters - Canu'r Pwll a'r Pulpud

=== Music ===
- Ffa Coffi Pawb - Dalec Peilon
- Trebor Edwards - Goreuon Trebor
- Bonnie Tyler - Hide Your Heart

== Film ==
- Peter Greenaway directs Drowning by Numbers.

=== Welsh-language films ===
- Stormydd Awst

== Broadcasting ==
=== Welsh-language television ===
- Pobol y Cwm becomes the first European soap opera to be broadcast daily.
- C'mon Midffild (drama)

=== English-language television ===
- The Divided Kingdom (HTV/Channel 4)

== Sport ==
- Association football
  - April – Newport County A.F.C., one of four Welsh teams in the English Football League, are relegated to the GM Vauxhall Conference.
- Athletics
  - Steve Jones becomes the first British competitor to win the New York Marathon.
- BBC Wales Sports Personality of the Year – Colin Jackson
- Rugby union
  - Wales top the 1988 Five Nations Championship winning the Triple Crown.
  - 18 May to 11 June – Wales tour New Zealand, losing heavily in both Tests to the All Blacks.
- Snooker
  - 2 May – Terry Griffiths is defeated in the final of the 1988 World Snooker Championship by Steve Davis.
  - 27 November – Doug Mountjoy defeats Stephen Hendry in the final of the UK Snooker Championship to claim his second UK title.

== Births ==
- 29 January - Catrin Stewart, actress
- 14 February - Jamie Jones, snooker player
- 18 February - Mark Davies, footballer
- 29 February - Hannah Mills, sports sailor
- 24 March - Curtis McDonald, footballer
- 11 April - Nathan Stephens, athlete and Paralympian
- 20 June - Shefali Chowdhury, actress
- 24 August - Kelly Lee Owens, electronic musician
- 5 October - Sam Warburton, rugby player
- 15 November - Dan Evans, rugby player
- 13 December - Darcy Blake, footballer
- 22 December - Leigh Halfpenny, rugby player
- 28 December
  - Ched Evans, footballer
  - Elfyn Evans, rally driver
- 31 December - Holly Holyoake, singer

== Deaths ==
- January - George Ewart Evans, folklorist and oral historian, 78
- 26 January - Raymond Williams, writer, 66
- 2 April - Euros Bowen, poet, 83
- April - T. Glynne Davies, poet, novelist and broadcaster, 62
- 13 May - Elfed Evans, footballer, 61
- 18 May - Brandon Rhys-Williams, politician, 60
- 15 June - David Blackmore, cricketer, 88
- 8 September - Mel Rosser, dual-code international rugby player, 87
- 23 September - Arwel Hughes, composer and conductor, 79
- 12 October - Ruth Manning-Sanders, poet and children's author, 102
- 16 October - John Gwilym Jones, dramatist, 84
- 11 November - William Ifor Jones, conductor and organist, 88
- 1 December - Alun Oldfield-Davies, controller of BBC Wales, 83
- 13 December - Brynmor John, politician, 54
- 25 December - W. F. Grimes, archaeologist, 83
- 27 December - Tecwyn Roberts, aerospace engineer, 63
- date unknown
  - John Morgan, journalist
  - Ray Price, rugby player, 64 (brain haemorrhage)
