= 1991 in Scottish television =

This is a list of events in Scottish television from 1991.

== Events ==
=== January ===
- No events.

=== February ===
- 18 February – BBC 1 Scotland is rebranded as BBC Scotland on 1 and BBC 2 Scotland as BBC Scotland on 2.

=== March to August ===
- No events.

=== September ===
- 1 September – 30th anniversary of Border Television.
- 30 September – 30th anniversary of Grampian Television.

=== October ===
- October – Scottish rebrands its overnight service as Scottish Night Time, and removed the overnight in-vision continuity.
- 16 October – The ITC announces that Grampian, Scottish and Border have retained their ITV franchises. Only Grampian's franchise had attracted rival bidders. The other two applicants for the north east Scotland franchise both submitted higher cash bids but both failed to meet the quality threshold.

=== November ===
- No events.

=== December ===
- 31 December – The BBC airs the first edition of Hogmanay Live, an annual programme that rings in the New Year.

=== Unknown ===
- BBC Scotland airs the series Restless Nation which explores the history of Scottish self-government.

== Debuts ==
=== BBC ===
- Unknown – Restless Nation (1991)
- 31 December – Hogmanay Live (1991–present)

== Television series ==
- Scotsport (1957–2008)
- Reporting Scotland (1968–1983; 1984–present)
- Top Club (1971–1998)
- Scotland Today (1972–2009)
- Sportscene (1975–present)
- The Beechgrove Garden (1978–present)
- Grampian Today (1980–2009)
- Take the High Road (1980–2003)
- Taggart (1983–2010)
- James the Cat (1984–1992)
- Crossfire (1984–2004)
- Wheel of Fortune (1988–2001)
- Fun House (1989–1999)
- Win, Lose or Draw (1990–2004)

== Ending this year ==
- 10 November – Naked Video (1986–1991)
- City Lights (1984–1991)

== See also ==
- 1991 in Scotland
