= 1992 in Scottish television =

This is a list of events in Scottish television from 1992.

== Events ==
=== January ===
- 1 January – An edition of Taggart entitled Violent Delights is watched by more than 18 million viewers, the highest audience for the series.
- 19 January – The first edition of Sunday lunchtime political current affairs programme Scottish Lobby is broadcast on BBC2 Scotland.

=== March ===
- 14 March – 40th anniversary of BBC Scotland on 1.

=== April ===
- 9–10 April – Coverage of the results of the 1992 United Kingdom general election is broadcast both on BBC1 and ITV.

=== August ===
- 6 August – Lord Hope, the Lord President of the Court of Session, Scotland's most senior judge, permits the televising of appeals in both criminal and civil cases, the first time that cameras have been allowed into courts in the United Kingdom.

=== October ===
- 30 October – Scottish soap Take the High Road celebrates its 1,000th episode.

=== November ===
- 30 November – To mark the 53rd European Council meeting, held in Edinburgh on 11–12 December, BBC1 Scotland begins a week of programming dedicated to Europe, including comedy, sport, documentaries and political programmes. Reporting Scotland also carries a week of reports about Britain's relationship with Europe.

== Debuts ==
=== ITV ===
- 5 September – What's Up Doc? (1992–1995)

== Television series ==
- Scotsport (1957–2008)
- Reporting Scotland (1968–1983; 1984–present)
- Top Club (1971–1998)
- Scotland Today (1972–2009)
- Sportscene (1975–present)
- The Beechgrove Garden (1978–present)
- Grampian Today (1980–2009)
- Take the High Road (1980–2003)
- Taggart (1983–2010)
- Crossfire (1984–2004)
- Wheel of Fortune (1988–2001)
- Fun House (1989–1999)
- Win, Lose or Draw (1990–2004)

== Ending this year ==
- James the Cat (1984–1992)

== Deaths ==
- 22 March – Melissa Stribling, 64, actress
- 28 April – John Toye, 56, journalist and presenter

== See also ==
- 1992 in Scotland
