= 1991 in Scotland =

- Centuries: 18th; 19th; 20th; 21st
- Decades: 1970s; 1980s; 1990s; 2000s; 2010s
- See also: List of years in Scotland; Timeline of Scottish history 1991 in: The UK • England • Wales • Elsewhere; Scottish football: 1990–91 • 1991–92; 1991 in Scottish television

Events from the year 1991 in Scotland.

== Incumbents ==
- Secretary of State for Scotland and Keeper of the Great Seal – Ian Lang

=== Law officers ===
- Lord Advocate – Lord Fraser of Carmyllie
- Solicitor General for Scotland – Alan Rodger

=== Judiciary ===
- Lord President of the Court of Session and Lord Justice General – Lord Hope
- Lord Justice Clerk – Lord Ross
- Chairman of the Scottish Land Court – Lord Elliott

== Events ==
- 4 April – South Ronaldsay child abuse scandal: Social services in Orkney are criticised for their handling of more than 100 children who have returned to their families after being taken away over allegations of child abuse.
- 18 May – Motherwell F.C. triumph 4–3 over Dundee United to win the Scottish Cup.
- 8 July – Inauguration of full electric service on British Rail's East Coast Main Line from London King's Cross railway station through to Edinburgh Waverley.
- 9 July – Western Isles Council loses £23,000,000 in the closure of the Bank of Credit and Commerce International.
- 25 July – Age of Legal Capacity (Scotland) Act 1991, which gives full legal capacity to those aged over sixteen years, receives Royal Assent.
- 13 August – The Duke of Rothesay (now King Charles III), resigns as patron of Scotland's National Museum over a competition to design a new building.
- 27 August – Dornoch Firth Bridge opened.
- 29 August – Alick Buchanan-Smith, Conservative MP for Kincardine and Deeside, dies in office aged 59.
- 30 August – Liz McColgan wins a gold medal at the World Athletics Championships in Tokyo, Japan.
- October – Privatisation of the Scottish Bus Group concludes with sale of Western Scottish in a management buyout.
- 7 November – Kincardine and Deeside by-election results in the Liberal Democrats gaining the seat from the Conservative Party on a swing of 11.4%.
- 1 December – American grunge rock band Nirvana perform at The Southern Bar in Edinburgh. They were invited as guests of the Joyriders, who were initially unsure if the band would turn up or not.
- Highlands and Islands Enterprise supersedes the Highlands and Islands Development Board.
- Publication of Vera Carstairs' and Russell Morris' Deprivation and Health in Scotland by Aberdeen University Press, introducing the Carstairs index of deprivation.
- Closure of Blindwells opencast coal mining site ends 269 years of coal mining in East Lothian.

== Births ==
- 10 February – Rebecca Dempster, footballer
- 13 February – Declan Gallagher, footballer
- 22 February – Kyle Wilkie, footballer
- 13 May – Jen Beattie, footballer
- 3 July – Alison Howie, field hockey player
- 13 August – Lesley Doig, lawn bowler
- 12 September – Mike Towell, boxer (died 2016)
- 23 September – Lee Alexander, footballer
- 1 October – Jennifer Dodds, curler
- 2 October – Gordon Reid, wheelchair tennis player
- 14 October – Andrew Butchart, distance runner
- 7 November – Rachel Sermanni, folk musician
- 17 December – Tom Walker, indie folk-rock singer-songwriter
- 20 December – Rachael Boyle, footballer

== Deaths ==
- 2 February – Sir Monty Finniston, industrialist (born 1912)
- 20 February – Kathleen Garscadden, children's radio presenter (born 1897)
- 27 June – George MacLeod, soldier and minister of religion (born 1895)
- 29 August – Alick Buchanan-Smith, Conservative politician (born 1932)

== The arts ==
- October – Irvine Welsh's short story "The First Day of the Edinburgh Festival", later incorporated into Trainspotting, is published in New Writing Scotland.
- Robert Alan Jamieson's novel A Day at the Office is published.
- Jackie Kay's first, semi-autobiographical, poetry collection The Adoption Papers is published.

== See also ==
- 1991 in Northern Ireland
