= 1991 in England =

- Centuries: 18th; 19th; 20th; 21st
- Decades: 1970s; 1980s; 1990s; 2000s; 2010s
- See also: 1990–91 in English football 1991–92 in English football 1991 in the United Kingdom; Other events of 1991

Events from 1991 in England.

== Incumbent ==
- Monarch – Elizabeth II
- Prime Minister – John Major

== Events ==
=== January ===
- 8 January – A train crash at Cannon Street station in London kills one person and injures over 500.
- 11 January – As the recession deepens, 335 workers at the Peugeot car factory in Coventry are made redundant.
- 16 January – The final phase of the M40 motorway through Oxfordshire is opened, giving the West Midlands conurbation its first direct motorway link with London.

=== February ===
- 7 February – The Provisional Irish Republican Army launch a mortar attack against 10 Downing Street, blowing in all the windows of the cabinet room, during a session of the War Cabinet, but there are no injuries.
- 18 February – The IRA explodes bombs in the early morning at both Paddington station and Victoria station in London.

=== March ===
- 8 March – The Liberal Democrats win the Ribble Valley by-election.
- 14 March – The Birmingham Six are freed after the Court of Appeal quashes their convictions over the 1974 pub bombings in Birmingham which killed 21 people and injured more than 160 others.
- 28 March – An inquest in Sheffield into the Hillsborough disaster records a verdict of accidental death on the 95 people who died as a result of the tragedy in 1989. Many of the victims' families criticise the verdict, as many of them had been hoping for a verdict of unlawful killing against the police officers who patrolled the game.

=== April ===
- 8 April – The Football Association announces plans for a new "super league" of 18 clubs to replace the Football League First Division as the highest division of English football. The move is attacked by smaller Football League clubs, who fear that they could go out of business if TV revenue was confined to the proposed super league.
- 19 April – George Carey enthroned as Archbishop of Canterbury.

=== May ===
- 15 May – Manchester United make a winning return to European competitions for English clubs after five years of suspension due to the Heysel disaster, by defeating FC Barcelona of Spain 2–1 in the European Cup Winners' Cup final in Rotterdam. Mark Hughes scores both of United's goals as they secure their first European trophy since winning the European Cup in 1968.
- 18 May – Paul Gascoigne suffers cruciate knee ligament damage in Tottenham Hotspur's 2–1 FA Cup final victory over Nottingham Forest, which puts his proposed transfer to Italian side Lazio on hold, and is expected to rule him out for up to a year.
- 22 May – Nearly six months after the breakthrough in the Channel Tunnel service tunnel, the breakthrough in the North rail tunnel is achieved. On the same day, road links to the English terminal are improved when the final section of the M20 motorway is opened between Maidstone and Ashford, meaning that the Chunnel's unbroken motorway link with London has already been completed an estimated three years before the first trains move between Great Britain and France.
- 27 May – Eric Heffer, Labour MP for Liverpool Walton, dies after an 18-month battle against cancer.
- 29 May – Martin Blatchford, a disabled 31-year-old father-of-three from Dudley in the West Midlands, is sentenced to 14 days in prison for his refusal to pay the Poll Tax.

=== June ===
- 10 June – The National Gallery (London) opens its new Sainsbury Wing to the public.
- 12 June – International Convention Centre, Birmingham, incorporating Symphony Hall, opens.
- 28 June – The final breakthrough in the Channel Tunnel is achieved when the last section of clay in the South rail tunnel is bored away.
- 30 June – Peter Hurst married Louise Ann Hackworth in Oxford.

=== July ===
- 4 July – Labour retains Liverpool Walton in the by-election, with new MP Peter Kilfoyle gaining more than half of the vote.
- 5 July – A number of English local authorities lose money with the closure of the Bank of Credit and Commerce International amid fraud allegations.
- 8 July – Two suspected IRA terrorists shoot their way out of Brixton Prison in London.
- 11 July – Labour Party MP Terry Fields joins the list of people jailed for refusal to pay the poll tax after he receives a 60-day prison sentence. He is the first MP to be jailed for refusing to pay the controversial tax, which was introduced early in 1990.
- 14 July – Nigel Mansell achieves the 17th Grand Prix victory of his racing career at Silverstone, Northamptonshire.
- 15 July – 17th G7 summit is held in Brighton.
- 19 July – Dean Saunders, 27-year-old Welsh international striker, becomes the most expensive player to be signed by a British club when a £2.9 million fee takes him from Derby County to Liverpool, who have broken the record fee in British football for the third time in four years.
- 30 July – Italian opera singer Luciano Pavarotti sings to a 100,000-strong crowd in London's Hyde Park to commemorate 30 years in opera.
- 31 July – The High Court gives its approval for the formation of a new Premier League in English football, which is expected to begin the following year.

=== August ===
- 30 August – The father of 20-year-old Tony Bland, who has been in a Persistent vegetative state since suffering brain damage in the Hillsborough disaster in April 1989, says that his son should be allowed to die.

=== September ===
- 3 September – Rioting breaks out at Handsworth in Birmingham, Kates Hill in Dudley and Blackbird Leys in Oxford.
- 13 September – Further rioting breaks out in Tyneside.
- 14 September – George Buckley, Labour MP for Hemsworth in West Yorkshire, dies aged 56.
- 20 September – The Football League and the Football Association finally agree on plans to form the new Premier League for the following season.
- 21 September
  - Boxer Michael Watson suffers a serious brain injury in a fight with Chris Eubank at White Hart Lane, Tottenham, London; his condition is reported to be critical.
  - Richard Holt, Conservative MP for Langbaurgh in Cleveland, dies suddenly at the age of 60.

=== October ===
- 3 October – The 1991 Rugby World Cup begins in England.
- 9 October – The first sumo tournament to be held outside Japan is hosted at the Royal Albert Hall in London.
- 17 October – £1 million worth of cannabis is found near London, prompting the arrest of six people in the West Midlands.

=== November ===
- 7 November – Labour retains its control of Hemsworth in the by-election, with the new MP being Derek Enright. Another by-election sees the Conservatives lose Langbaurgh to Labour, who gain a new MP in 35-year-old Indian-born Ashok Kumar.
- 9 November – First ever controlled and substantial production of fusion energy achieved at the Joint European Torus in Oxford.
- 13 November – The England national football team qualifies for the European Championships, to be held in Sweden the following summer, when a late goal from striker Gary Lineker seals a 1–1 draw with Poland.
- 20 November – England striker Gary Lineker agrees to a contract to join Grampus Eight of Japan from Tottenham Hotspur at the end of the current English football season.
- 25 November – Winston Silcott has his conviction for the murder of PC Keith Blakelock quashed. Silcott had been jailed for life in 1987 for the murder of PC Blakelock in the Tottenham riots of 1985, but he will remain imprisoned as he is serving a second life sentence for another unconnected crime.
- 28 November – First performance of Alan Bennett's play The Madness of George III in London.
- 29 November – England footballer Gary Lineker announces that his eight-week-old son George is suffering from acute myeloid leukaemia, an illness which has a survival rate of 25%.

=== December ===
- 6 December – At Birmingham Crown Court, John Tanner is convicted of the murder of Rachel McLean and sentenced to life imprisonment.
- 10 December – English-born Ronald Coase wins the Nobel Prize in Economics "for his discovery and clarification of the significance of transaction costs and property rights for the institutional structure and functioning of the economy".

== Births ==
- 10 March – Usman Khan, Islamic terrorist and perpetrator of the 2019 London Bridge stabbing (died 2019)
- Nubya Garcia, jazz musician, saxophonist and composer

== Deaths ==
- 27 April – Sylvia Gray, businessperson (b. 1909).

== See also ==
- 1991 in Northern Ireland
- 1991 in Scotland
- 1991 in Wales
