= 1989 in England =

- Centuries: 18th; 19th; 20th; 21st
- Decades: 1960s; 1970s; 1980s; 1990s; 2000s
- See also: 1988–89 in English football 1989–90 in English football 1989 in the United Kingdom; Other events of 1989

Events from 1989 in England

== Incumbent ==
- Monarch – Elizabeth II
- Prime Minister – Margaret Thatcher

== Events ==
=== January ===
- 8 January – The Kegworth air disaster: A British Midland Boeing 737 crashes onto the M1 motorway on the approach to East Midlands Airport, killing 44 people.
- 11 January
  - Accident investigators say that the Kegworth air disaster was caused when pilot Kevin Hunt, who survived the crash, accidentally shut down the wrong engine.
  - Abbey National building society offers free shares to its 5,500,000 members.
- 14 January – Muslims demonstrate in Bradford against The Satanic Verses, a book written by Salman Rushdie, burning copies of the book in the city streets.
- 25 January – John Cleese wins a libel case after the Daily Mirror described him as having become like his character Basil Fawlty in the sitcom Fawlty Towers.

=== February ===
- 20 February – IRA bomb the Tern Hill Barracks in Shropshire, injuring 50 soldiers of the Parachute Regiment.
- 23 February – 27-year-old William Hague wins the Richmond by-election in North Yorkshire for the Conservative Party following the departure of Leon Brittan to the European Commission.

=== March ===
- 4 March – Purley rail crash: two trains collide at Purley, Surrey killing six people.
- 17 March – The three men convicted of murdering paperboy Carl Bridgewater in Staffordshire 10 years ago have their appeals rejected. A fourth man convicted in connection with the killing died in prison in 1981.

=== April ===
- 10 April – Nick Faldo becomes the first English winner of Masters Tournament.
- 14 April – Ford unveils the latest version of its small Fiesta hatchback, which is being built at the Dagenham plant in England and the Valencia plant in Spain.
- 15 April – 94 fans are killed in a crush during the FA Cup semi-final at the Hillsborough Stadium in Sheffield during the FA Cup semi-final between Nottingham Forest FC and Liverpool F.C. Around 300 others have been hospitalized. Several of those injured are in a serious condition and there are fears that the death toll (already the worst of any sporting disaster in Britain) could rise even higher. The youngest victim is a 10-year-old boy, the oldest is 67-year-old Gerard Baron, brother of the late former Liverpool player Kevin Baron.
- 16 April – Denis Howell, a former Labour sports minister, urges for the FA Cup final to go ahead this season despite consideration by The Football Association for it to be cancelled due to the Hillsborough disaster.
- 17 April – Home Secretary Douglas Hurd announces plans to make all-seater stadiums compulsory for all Football League First Division clubs to reduce the risk of a repeat of the Hillsborough tragedy.
- 18 April –
  - Tottenham Hotspur remove perimeter fencing from their White Hart Lane stadium as the first step towards avoiding a repeat of the Hillsborough disaster is taken in English football.
  - The Hillsborough disaster claims its 95th victim when 14-year-old Lee Nicol dies in hospital as a result of his injuries. He was visited in hospital by Diana, Princess of Wales, hours before he died.
- 19 April – The Sun newspaper sparks outrage on Merseyside with an article entitled "The Truth", which wrongly claims that spectators robbed injured and dead spectators, and attacked police officers when they were helping the injured and dying. See Hillsborough disaster and The Sun.
- 20 April – The London Underground is at virtual standstill for a day as most of the workers go on strike in protest against plans for driver-only operated trains.
- 28 April
  - John Cannan, of Sutton Coldfield, is sentenced to life imprisonment with a recommendation that he should never be released after being found guilty of murdering one woman and sexually assaulting two others.
  - Fourteen Liverpool fans are convicted of manslaughter and receive prison sentences of up to three years in Brussels, Belgium, in connection with the Heysel disaster at the 1985 European Cup Final in which 39 spectators (most of them Italian) died. A further eleven Liverpool fans are cleared.

=== May ===
- 26 May – Arsenal defeat Liverpool 2–0 at Anfield to win the First Division title in the most dramatic conclusion to an English football season. Michael Thomas scores Arsenal's crucial second goal in the last minute of the last game of the season, making Arsenal champions on goals scored with the teams level on both points and goal difference.

=== July ===
- 10 July – House prices in the south of England decrease for the second successive quarter, but continue to rise in Scotland as well as the north of England.
- 25 July – Princess Diana, Princess of Wales, opens the Landmark AIDS Centre, a day centre for people with AIDS, in London.

=== August ===
- 1 August – Charlotte Hughes of Marske-by-the-Sea in Cleveland, believed to be the oldest living person in England, celebrates her 112th birthday.
- 5 August – A train derails near West Ealing station in London, but the passengers escape without serious injuries.
- 18 August – Manchester United chairman Martin Edwards agrees to sell the club to Michael Knighton for £10 million.
- 20 August – The Marchioness disaster occurs, in which a pleasure cruiser collides with a barge on the River Thames, killing 51 people.
- 29 August – Stone-throwing youths cause mayhem at the Notting Hill Carnival in London, injuring innocent bystanders.
- 30 August – The National Trust's house at Uppark in West Sussex is severely damaged by fire.
- 31 August – Buckingham Palace confirms that the Princess Royal and Captain Mark Phillips are separating after 16 years of marriage.

== Births ==
- 2 March – Nathalie Emmanuel, actress
- 13 March – Harry Melling, actor
- 5 April – Lily James, actress
- 9 May – Ellen White, footballer
- 27 June – Matthew Lewis, actor
- 23 July – Daniel Radcliffe, actor
- 20 October – Jess Glynne, singer
- 10 November – Taron Egerton, English-born Welsh actor
- 7 December – Nicholas Hoult, actor
- Unknown date – Roshonara Choudhry, convicted attacker of MP Stephen Timms

== Deaths ==
- 14 April – Elizabeth Mary Aslin (1923–1989), English art historian

== See also ==
- 1989 in Northern Ireland
- 1989 in Scotland
- 1989 in Wales
