= 1993 in England =

- Centuries: 18th; 19th; 20th; 21st
- Decades: 1970s; 1980s; 1990s; 2000s; 2010s
- See also: 1992–93 in English football 1993–94 in English football 1993 in the United Kingdom; Other events of 1993

Events from 1993 in England

== Incumbent ==
- Monarch - Elizabeth II
- Prime Minister - John Major

== Events ==
=== February ===
- 12 February - Merseyside toddler James Bulger is reporting missing after he disappeared from the Strand Shopping Centre in Bootle.
- 14 February - Police on Merseyside confirm that they have found the body of James Bulger, who went missing two days previously, on a railway line in Walton, Merseyside, approximately two miles from where he was last seen.
- 19 February - Judith Chaplin, Conservative MP for Newbury in Berkshire, dies suddenly at the age of 53 after less than a year in parliament.
- 20 February - Two 10-year-old boys are arrested in connection with the death of James Bulger.
- 22 February - The two boys arrested in connection with James Bulger's death are charged with murder.
- 24 February - Bobby Moore, who captained the England national football team to World Cup glory in 1966, dies of cancer aged 51. He had been ill for two years but only made his illness public nine days before.

=== March ===
- 2 March - A unique £100million manufacturing centre devoted solely to motoring components in unveiled at Wednesbury, West Midlands, on the site of the Patent Shaft steel works which was open from 1840 until 1980. The development is set to receive a direct dual carriageway link with the M5 and M6 motorways within the next two years when the Black Country Spine Road is completed.
- 3 March - Tony Bland, who was given the right to die by the High Court due to injuries suffered in the Hillsborough disaster, dies after being in a coma for nearly four years. This brings the Hillsborough death toll to 96.
- 20 March - Warrington bomb attacks: An IRA bomb on Warrington, Cheshire, claims the life of three-year-old Jonathan Ball and injures more than 50 other people.
- 25 March - The IRA attack on Warrington claims its second victim when 12-year-old Timothy Parry dies in hospital from his injuries.

=== April ===
- April - Rover Group enters the compact executive market with its 600 Series, which is based on the Honda Accord and built at the Cowley plant in Oxford.
- 3 April - A false start forces the Grand National to be cancelled.
- 18 April - Arsenal are Football League Cup winners for the second time, defeating Sheffield Wednesday 2–1 at Wembley Stadium in the final. Steve Morrow, the player who scored the winning goal, breaks his arm in a freak accident during the end-of-match celebrations.
- 22 April - Black student Stephen Lawrence, 18, is stabbed to death in Eltham, London. Police suspect that the murder was racially motivated.
- 24 April - Bishopsgate bombing. A massive bomb explodes at Bishopsgate in the City of London. The blast destroys the medieval St Ethelburga's church, and badly damages the NatWest Tower and Liverpool Street tube station.
- 26 April - Brian Clough, currently the longest serving manager with any Premier League or Football League club, announces that he will retire next month after 18 years in charge of Nottingham Forest.
- 28 April - It is reported that 1992 saw a record 5,600,000 crimes reported in England and Wales. Staffordshire saw crime rise by a record 16% during 1992.

=== May ===
- May - Jay Jopling opens the London gallery White Cube. Tracey Emin's first major exhibition, "My Major Retrospective 1963-1993" (sic.) opens here on 19 November.
- 1 May - The 1993 Challenge Cup tournament concludes with Wigan defeating Widnes 20–14 in the final at London's Wembley Stadium before a crowd of 78,348.
- 2 May - Manchester United become top division champions of English football for the first time since 1967 when their nearest rivals, Aston Villa, suffer a surprise 1–0 home defeat by Oldham Athletic.
- 7 May - Local council elections see the Conservatives losing control of 15 local councils and remain in control of just one out of 47 county councils in England and Wales. They also lose a 12,357 majority in the Newbury by-election, with the Liberal Democrats gaining the seat by 22,055 votes under new MP David Rendel.
- 13 May - Robert Adley, Conservative MP for Christchurch in Dorset, dies from a heart attack aged 58.
- 14 May - Terry Venables, chief executive and former manager of Tottenham Hotspur, is dismissed from the club by chairman Alan Sugar, only to be reinstated by the High Court.
- 15 May - The FA Cup final ends in a 1–1 draw between Arsenal and Sheffield Wednesday at Wembley Stadium. The two clubs met two months ago in the Football League Cup final (which Arsenal won 2–1), and will contest the FA Cup final replay in four days time.
- 17 May - Nurse Beverley Allitt is found guilty of murdering four children and attempted to murder nine others. Allitt, who killed the children with injections at Grantham Hospital, is sentenced to life imprisonment with a recommendation of at least 40 years. Allitt, who suffers from a personality disorder, will serve her sentence in a secure mental hospital.
- 19 May - Arsenal defeat Sheffield Wednesday 2–1 in the FA Cup final replay.
- 23 May - Former nurse Beverley Allitt, 25, is sentenced to life imprisonment after being found guilty of killing four children and harming nine others at a Lincolnshire hospital.

=== June ===
- 2 June - The England football team's hopes of World Cup qualification are thrown into doubt when they suffer a shock 2–0 defeat by Norway in Oslo.
- 9 June - The England football team suffer their second humiliation in a week when they lose 2–0 to the United States of America national football team in a friendly in Foxborough, Massachusetts.
- 20 June - A high speed train makes the first journey from France to England via the Channel Tunnel, which will open to the public next year.
- 21 June - Tate St Ives art gallery opens in Cornwall.

=== July ===
- 18 July - Ian Botham announces his retirement from cricket.
- 19 July - American film maker Sam Wanamaker is awarded an honorary CBE for his work to rebuild Shakespeare's Globe.
- 22 July - Roy Keane becomes the most expensive player signed by a British soccer club when a £3.75million fee takes him from Nottingham Forest to Manchester United. Keane, 22 next month, is a Republic of Ireland international midfielder who made his English league debut in 1990.
- 29 July
  - Conservative Party loses the Christchurch by-election to the Liberal Democrats - a seat they have held since 1910. New MP Diana Maddock gains more than 60% of the vote - twice as many as the Conservative candidate Robert Hayward.
  - Two Lewisham teenagers, both aged under 18, are acquitted of murdering Stephen Lawrence, who was fatally stabbed in London three months ago.

=== August ===
- 3 August - A wave of vandalism in Southampton sees anti-Semitic slogans daubed on 150 Jewish graves.
- 11 August - The Department of Health reveals that the number of people on hospital waiting lists has reached 1,000,000 for the first time.
- 18 August - Three miners are killed by a collapsing roof at a colliery in Bilsthorpe, Nottinghamshire.
- 22 August - Elderly siblings are found murdered Anne Castle and William Bryan at their home in London.

=== September ===
- 17 September - The British National Party wins its first council seat on Tower Hamlets.
- 19 September - Rioting between anti-fascist campaigners and Neo Nazis breaks out in the East End of London in the wake of the British National Party gaining its first local councillor.

=== October ===
- October - Building work begins on Poundbury, a unique urban village in Dorchester which is expected to provide homes for several thousand people by 2005.
- 13 October - England's hopes of football World Cup qualification are left hanging by a thread when they lost 2-0 to Holland in the penultimate qualifying game in Rotterdam. Fierce fighting between English and Dutch fans takes place after the game.

=== November ===
- 1 November - Two 11-year-old boys go on trial at Preston Crown Court accused of murdering Liverpool toddler James Bulger.
- 17 November
  - A teacher and ten children, all from Hagley RC High School near Birmingham, are killed in a minibus crash on the M40 in Warwickshire.
  - England's hopes of World Cup qualification are ended despite victory over San Marino as Holland defeated Poland and joined Norway as the two teams in the group qualifying for the World Cup next summer.
- 23 November - Graham Taylor announces his resignation as England football team manager after three years in charge.
- 24 November - Two 11-year-old boys are convicted at Preston Crown Court of murdering James Bulger. The trial judge sentences them to detention at Her Majesty's pleasure, with a recommendation that they should be imprisoned for "very, very many years to come" before being considered for release. The judge removes an identity restriction on the two killers, naming them as Robert Thompson and Jon Venables.
- 25 November - TV entertainer Roy Castle, 61, announces that he is suffering from a recurrence of the lung cancer which he was believed to have overcome one year ago.

=== December ===
- 9 December - Danny Blanchflower, who captained Tottenham Hotspur to the first league championship and FA Cup double of the 20th century in 1961 and became a football writer after his retirement as a player in 1964, dies of Alzheimer's disease aged 67.
- 10 December - Richard J. Roberts wins the Nobel Prize in Physiology or Medicine jointly with Phillip Allen Sharp "for their discoveries of split genes".
- 20 December - Colin Ireland is sentenced to life imprisonment at the Old Bailey for the murder of five gay men in London.

== Deaths ==
- 7 June – Joyce Bishop, educator (born 1896)
- 21 November – Margaret Boyd, lacrosse player and schoolteacher (born 1913)

== See also ==
- 1993 in Northern Ireland
- 1993 in Scotland
- 1993 in Wales
