= 1994 in Scottish television =

This is a list of events in Scottish television from 1994.

== Events ==
=== April ===
- 20 April – 30th anniversary of BBC Scotland on 2.

=== June ===
- 6 June – Death of Scottish actor Mark McManus, best known for his portrayal of Glaswegian detective Jim Taggart. The Taggart series continued following his death.

=== July ===
- 22 July – Take the High Road is renamed High Road.

=== November ===
- 10 November – The first edition of BBC Scotland Investigates is broadcast. It replaces Frontline Scotland.

== Debuts ==
=== BBC ===
- 9 January – The High Life on BBC Scotland on 2 (1994–1995)
- Unknown – The Tales of Para Handy (1994–1995)
- Unknown – World Tour of Scotland (1994)

=== ITV ===
- 7 January – The Magic House (1994–1996)

== Television series ==
- Scotsport (1957–2008)
- Reporting Scotland (1968–1983; 1984–present)
- Top Club (1971–1998)
- Scotland Today (1972–2009)
- Sportscene (1975–present)
- The Beechgrove Garden (1978–present)
- Grampian Today (1980–2009)
- Take the High Road (1980–2003)
- Taggart (1983–2010)
- Crossfire (1984–2004)
- Wheel of Fortune (1988–2001)
- Fun House (1989–1999)
- Win, Lose or Draw (1990–2004)
- What's Up Doc? (1992–1995)
- Doctor Finlay (1993–1996)
- Machair (1993–1999)
- Speaking our Language (1993–1996)
- Wolf It (1993–1996)
- Hurricanes (1993–1997)
- Telefios (1993–2000)
- Only an Excuse? (1993–2020)

== Births ==
- 15 February – Marcus Nash, actor

== Deaths ==
- 16 April – Frank Wylie, 58, actor
- 6 June – Mark McManus, 59, actor (Taggart)

== See also ==
- 1994 in Scotland
