= 1988 in England =

- Centuries: 18th; 19th; 20th; 21st
- Decades: 1960s; 1970s; 1980s; 1990s; 2000s
- See also: 1987–88 in English football 1988–89 in English football 1988 in the United Kingdom; Other events of 1988

Events from 1988 in England.

== Incumbent ==
- Monarch – Elizabeth II
- Prime Minister – Margaret Thatcher

== Events ==
=== January ===
- 9 January – One of the worst incidents of football hooliganism this season sees 41 suspected hooligans arrested at the FA Cup third round tie between Arsenal and Millwall at Highbury.

=== February ===
- 3 February – Nurses across the UK go on strike, demanding better pay and more funding for the NHS.
- 5 February – The National Union of Seamen calls off a ferry strike that had been called on 31 January in response to the firing of 161 crew workers by the Isle of Man Steam Packet Company. Despite the union's orders, however, thousands of seamen across the UK continue to strike.

=== March ===
- 6 March – SAS soldiers shot dead three unarmed IRA members in Gibraltar, leading to widespread republican criticism.

=== June ===
- 21 June – The Poole explosion of 1988 caused 3,500 people to be evacuated out of the town centre in the biggest peacetime evacuation the country had seen since the World War II.

== Births ==
- 14 January – Sian Honnor, lawn bowler
- 2 March – James Arthur, singer and songwriter
- 27 March – Jessie J, singer
- 18 April – Vanessa Kirby, actress
- 12 August – Tyson Fury, boxer
- 24 August – Rupert Grint, actor
- 15 September – John Bradley, actor
- 22 November – Jamie Campbell Bower, actor, singer and model

== Deaths ==
- 14 August – Margaret Sampson, Anglican nun

== See also ==
- 1988 in Northern Ireland
- 1988 in Scotland
- 1988 in Wales
