= 1990 in England =

- Centuries: 18th; 19th; 20th; 21st
- Decades: 1970s; 1980s; 1990s; 2000s; 2010s
- See also: 1989–90 in English football 1990–91 in English football 1990 in the United Kingdom; Other events of 1990

Events from 1990 in England.

== Incumbent ==
- Monarch – Elizabeth II
- Prime Minister – Margaret Thatcher (until 28 November), John Major (from 28 November)

== Events ==
=== January ===
- 2 January – Controversial judge James Pickles sentences 19-year-old Huddersfield supermarket cashier Tracey Scott, who has a 10-week-old baby, to six months in prison after she admitted helping shoplifters. Judge Pickles defends his controversial decision to jail Ms Scott by saying that he needed to let women know that they could not avoid custody just by becoming pregnant.
- 13 January – Some 50,000 people demonstrate on the streets of London in support of Britain's ambulance workers, as the ongoing ambulance crew strike has yet to end four months after it began.
- 16 January – Tracey Scott is freed after serving 14 days of her prison sentence.
- 19 January – Police in Johannesburg, South Africa, break up a demonstration against the cricket match played by rebel English cricketers led by Mike Gatting.
- 25 January – Burns' Day storm: hurricane-force winds are reported to have killed 39 people in England and Wales.
- 29 January – Lord Justice Taylor publishes his report on the Hillsborough disaster, which claimed the lives of 95 Liverpool F.C. supporters on 15 April 1989. He recommends that all top division stadiums be all-seater by 1994 and that the rest of the Football League follow suit by 1999.

=== February ===
- 20 February – Three people are injured in Leicester city centre by a bomb explosion.

=== March ===
- 9 March – 37 people are arrested and 10 police officers injured in Brixton, London, during rioting against the new Community Charge.
- 21 March – Allan Roberts, Labour MP for Bootle, dies of cancer aged 46.
- 23 March – The Duke and Duchess of York's second child, another daughter, is born.
- 31 March – 200,000 protesters take part in the Poll Tax Riots in London in the week preceding official introduction of the Community Charge.

=== April ===
- 1 April – Strangeways Prison riot begins in Manchester, lasting until 25 April.
- 2 April – An earthquake measuring 5.1 on the Richter scale and centred on the Shropshire town of Bishop's Castle is felt throughout much of England and Wales.
- 3 April – The government forces twenty local councils to cut their proposed Community Charge levels.
- 4 April – Dr Raymond Crockett is struck off the medical register for using kidneys from Turkish immigrants who had been paid to donate them.
- 5 April – German food superstore chain Aldi opens its first British store in Birmingham and plans to have up to 200 stores across the country by 1993.
- 28 April – Liverpool F.C. are champions of the Football League for a record 18th time.
- 29 April – Nottingham Forest equal Liverpool's record of four Football League Cup wins by defeating Oldham Athletic 1–0 in the final at Wembley Stadium. 21-year-old striker Nigel Jemson scores the only goal of the game.

=== May ===
- May – The second phase of the landmark Nissan car factory near Sunderland is opened, four years after the first phase, to prepare for production of the Bluebird replacement, the Primera, which goes on sale later in the year.
- 12 May – The FA Cup final ends in a 3–3 draw between Manchester United and Crystal Palace FC, an extra time equaliser from United striker Mark Hughes forcing a replay.
- 17 May – Manchester United equal the record total for FA Cup wins by winning the final replay 1–0 against Crystal Palace. Defender Lee Martin scores the only goal of the game.
- 24 May – Bobby Robson announces that he will be leaving his job as England football manager after the 1990 World Cup to take charge of the Dutch club PSV Eindhoven.
- 25 May – The "rump" Social Democratic Party (consisting of members who backed out of the merger with the Liberal Party which formed the Liberal Democrats in 1988) finishes behind the Monster Raving Loony Party in the Bootle by-election, where Labour retain power under new MP Michael Carr.
- 28 May – Swindon Town, managed by the former Tottenham Hotspur and Argentina footballer Ossie Ardiles, win promotion to the Football League First Division for the first time in their history by defeating Sunderland 1–0 in the Second Division playoff final at Wembley Stadium.

=== June ===
- 1 June – An army recruit is shot dead and two others are wounded by two suspected IRA gunmen in Lichfield, Staffordshire.
- 7 June – Swindon Town are found guilty on 36 charges of financial irregularities and their promotion to the First Division is replaced with relegation to the Third Division, with Sunderland being promoted in their place and their place in the Second Division being given to Tranmere Rovers.
- 17 June – Over 20,000 Swindon Town football fans demonstrate on the streets of Swindon in a bid for promotion to the First Division to be restored.
- 22 June – Housing Minister Michael Spicer announces a £15 million plan to tackle homelessness.

=== July ===
- 2 July – Swindon Town Football Club are allowed to remain in the Second Division after a successful appeal to the Football Association.
- 4 July – England's chances of winning the World Cup are ended by a penalty shoot-out defeat at the hands of West Germany in the semi-finals.
- 10 July – FIFA announces that the ban on English clubs following the Heysel disaster in 1985 will be lifted following the good behaviour of English fans at the World Cup; however, not all of the English league's European places will be restored immediately. Aston Villa, the league runners-up, will be England's sole entrants in the UEFA Cup, while FA Cup winners Manchester United will compete in the European Cup Winners' Cup and league champions Liverpool – the team whose rioting at the 1985 European Cup final resulted in the ban – will have to serve at least one extra year, meaning that there will be no English representation at the 1990–91 European Cup.
- 15 July – The Football Association names Graham Taylor as the new England manager. Taylor, 46, recently took Aston Villa to second place in the English league, and also reached an FA Cup final with his previous club Watford.
- 16 July – Nigel Mansell, England's most successful racing driver of the last 10 years, announces that he is to retire from Grand Prix races at the end of the 1990 season.
- 20 July
  - An IRA bomb explodes at Stock Exchange Tower, the base of the London Stock Exchange.
  - Michael Carr, Labour MP for Bootle, dies after just 57 days in parliament from a heart attack at the age of 43.
- 30 July – An IRA car bomb kills British MP Ian Gow, a staunch unionist, after he assured the IRA that the British government would never surrender to them.
- 31 July
  - The England cricket team defeats the India national cricket team in a high-scoring Lord's Test match totalling 1,603 runs.
  - Aldershot FC, members of the Football League Fourth Division, are wound up in the High Court "hopelessly insolvent" with debts of £495,000.

=== August ===
- August – Sadler's Wells Royal Ballet company is renamed Birmingham Royal Ballet on relocation to a residency at the Birmingham Hippodrome.
- 3 August – Heat wave peaks with a temperature of 37.1 °C (99 °F) recorded at Nailstone, Leicestershire.
- 7 August – The winding-up order on Aldershot FC is lifted when 19-year-old property developer Spencer Trethewy pledges a £200,000 rescue package for the Hampshire-based club.
- 25 August – Marks & Spencer closes its Dudley and West Bromwich stores, the latest casualties in the new trend of leading retailers abandoning traditional town centres for out-of-town relocations; a replacement for both stores will open at the nearby Merry Hill Shopping Centre on 23 October.
- 29 August – Home Secretary David Waddington announces that the case of the Birmingham Six will be referred to the Court of Appeal.

=== September ===
- 4 September
  - A fire causes severe damage to the historic town centre of Totnes in Devon.
  - The large Meadowhall Centre, the second largest shopping complex in Britain, opens on a former steelworks site in Sheffield, South Yorkshire.
- 18 September – Air Chief Marshal Sir Peter Terry survives a murder attempt by IRA terrorists at his home near Stafford.

=== October ===
- 18 October – Eastbourne by-election in East Sussex: David Bellotti for the Liberal Democrats wins the "safe" Conservative seat.

=== November ===
- 8 November – The second Bootle by-election of the year sees Labour hold onto the seat once more with new MP Joe Benton gaining nearly 80% of the votes.
- 12 November – The Football Association penalises Arsenal two points and Manchester United one point and fines both clubs £50,000 for a mass player brawl in a Football League match between the two clubs the previous month at Old Trafford.
- 26 November – Plastic surgeons Michael Masser and Kenneth Patton are murdered in Wakefield, West Yorkshire.

=== December ===
- 3 December – The mother of Gail Kinchin is awarded £8,000 in the High Court, a decade after her pregnant 16-year-old daughter was killed by a police marksman who intervened in a siege at the Birmingham flat where she was being held hostage by her boyfriend.
- 13 December – Russell Bishop is sentenced to life imprisonment (with a recommended minimum of 15 years) for the abduction, indecent assault and attempted murder of a seven-year-old girl in Brighton earlier in the year. Bishop, 24, was cleared of murdering two other girls in 1987.
- 19 December – Tony Adams, the Arsenal captain and England defender, is sentenced to four months in prison for a drink-driving offence committed in Southend-on-Sea on 6 May.

== See also ==
- 1990 in Northern Ireland
- 1990 in Scotland
- 1990 in Wales
