= 1994 in Scotland =

- Centuries: 18th; 19th; 20th; 21st
- Decades: 1970s; 1980s; 1990s; 2000s; 2010s
- See also: List of years in Scotland; Timeline of Scottish history 1994 in: The UK • England • Wales • Elsewhere; Scottish football: 1993–94 • 1994–95; 1994 in Scottish television

Events from the year 1994 in Scotland.

== Incumbents ==
- Secretary of State for Scotland and Keeper of the Great Seal – Ian Lang

=== Law officers ===
- Lord Advocate – Lord Rodger of Earlsferry
- Solicitor General for Scotland – Thomas Dawson

=== Judiciary ===
- Lord President of the Court of Session and Lord Justice General – Lord Hope
- Lord Justice Clerk – Lord Ross
- Chairman of the Scottish Land Court – Lord Philip

== Events ==
- March – Strathclyde water referendum indicates overwhelming opposition to the privatisation of water.
- 5 May – elections are held for Scotland's Regional Councils.
- 19 May – Robert Black, jailed for life four years ago for abducting a seven-year-old girl in the Scottish Borders, is found guilty of murdering three girls in the 1980s and sentenced to life imprisonment with a recommended minimum term of 35 years. Black dies in HMP Maghaberry in Northern Ireland of a heart attack in January 2016.
- 25 April – Dundee Institute of Technology elevated to the status of Abertay University.
- 2 June – Chinook crash on Mull of Kintyre: An RAF Chinook helicopter carrying more than twenty leading intelligence experts crashes on the Mull of Kintyre, killing everyone on board.
- 9 June – European elections result in Labour winning six of Scotland's eight MEPs, with the SNP winning the other two.
- 25 June – The Greenock rail accident, caused by vandals placing concrete blocks on the rails, kills two people.
- 30 June – Monklands East by-election results in the Labour Party retaining the seat despite a swing of 19.2% to the SNP.
- 3 November – The Local Government etc. (Scotland) Act 1994, that will reorganise local government by creating 32 unitary authorities, receives royal assent.
- Dounreay nuclear power plant comes offline.
- Highland Theological Institute established in Dingwall.

== Births ==
- 1 January – Craig Murray, footballer
- 14 January – Ross Murdoch, swimmer
- 8 March – Claire Emslie, footballer
- 11 March - Andrew Robertson, footballer
- 12 March – Katie Archibald, cyclist
- 23 March – Jack Hamilton, goalkeeper
- 10 April – Siobhan Hunter, footballer
- 29 April – Stephen Milne, swimmer
- 24 May – Emily Nicholl, netball player
- 11 July – Jake Wightman, middle-distance runner
- 30 August – Jo Muir, modern pentathlete
- 12 September – Mhairi Black, SNP MP for Paisley and Renfrewshire South

== Deaths ==
- 3 January – Marion Ross, physicist (born 1903)
- 12 May – John Smith, leader of the Labour Party (UK) (born 1938)
- 6 June – Mark McManus, film and television actor (born 1935)
- 14 June – Denys Hay, historian (born 1915 in England)
- Rhoda Bulter, poet (born 1929)

== Arts and literature ==
- 9 May – release of Scottish group Wet Wet Wet's cover of the song Love Is All Around (1967), as featured in the recently released film Four Weddings and a Funeral. From 29 May it will spend 15 consecutive weeks at number one in the UK Singles Chart, the longest spell ever attained by a British act.
- June – the old Empire Palace Theatre in Edinburgh reopens permanently as the Edinburgh Festival Theatre.
- 23 August – K Foundation enact K Foundation Burn a Million Quid on the Ardfin Estate on Jura.
- August – Theresa Breslin's young adult novel Whispers in the Graveyard is published.
- James Kelman's stream of consciousness novel How Late It Was, How Late, written in Glasgow patter, is published.
- Alternative rock band Snow Patrol is formed by students from Northern Ireland at the University of Dundee.

== See also ==
- 1994 in England
- 1994 in Northern Ireland
- 1994 in Wales
