= Cantorion Colin Jones =

Cantorion Colin Jones a Welsh concert choir founded by the late Colin Jones on the 1st September 1991 in the Lecture Theatre of Plas Coch College (later Glyndŵr University). The choir united many of the finest singers whom Colin had taught earlier, many amongst these singers conducted in choirs across North Wales.

The choir's first public performance was in William Aston Hall, Wrexham, North Wales, in February 1993. Following this performance, the choir team was invited across the world for many more concerts. During this time the name was supplemented with "The North Wales Male Chorus". In 1996 they toured Australia and followed this tour with performances in Washington & Los Angeles (USA) to Singapore and Italy. The choir regularly supported cultural events in Wales, their performances helped raise money for the National Eisteddfod of Wales. Their first CD contained their most popular musicals produced under the banner of "Famous Welsh Choirs" associated with the Black Mountain Record label. In 2003 the choir released their new CD "In Concert" (Mewn Cyngerdd) which featured songs performed in live concerts.

After a long period its original founder and choral architect Colin Jones retired in November 2008. John Daniel became the musical director in early 2009. John hailed from Rhosllannerchrugog, the same village as Colin. The choir continued to entertain, growing in reputation by promoting many new male choruses. The choir released their third CD "Nessun Dorma" in 2011, the first under the direction of John Daniel. In 2011, John introduced his first Male Voice Choir Workshop in Llanrwst. At Conway valley, members of public were invited to join the ranks of the Cantorion during a rehearsal. In 2012 John Daniel retired and the choir appointed Aled Wyn Edwards as its third musical director. At the AGM in 2015, the choir was rebranded as Cantorion Gogledd Cymru.
