= Thyrza Anne Leyshon =

Welsh artist (1892–1996)

- Born: 1892; Swansea, Wales
- Died: 1996 (aged 103–104)
- Education: Swansea Art School
- Known for: Painting

Thyrza Anne Leyshon (1892–1996) was a Welsh artist known as a painter of miniatures.

== Biography ==
Leyshon was born, and lived most of her life, in Swansea in south Wales. For many years she worked as a manager with the Singer Sewing Machine Company before becoming a civil servant with the Inland Revenue. When she retired from the Civil Service in 1942 she enrolled at Swansea Art School and also took private lessions, in London, with the miniature painter Ethol Court. Leyshon painted miniatures of Welsh and Scottish landscapes and also portraits in watercolour on ivory. From the early 1960s she exhibited these in group shows and other exhibitions in Belgium, France and America as well as in the UK. Leyshon exhibited at the Paris Salon in 1962, 1965 and several times between 1968 and 1974 as well as at the Circle Nationale Belge d'Art et Esthetique in Brussels in 1963 and at the Royal Academy in London during 1969. She won a gold medal at the Paris Salon in 1973 and a silver medal there in 1968 and also won a silver medal in 1973 in Brussels. In her home town of Swansea Leyshon was a regular exhibitor at the Glynn Vivian Art Gallery and was also an associate member of the Society of Miniaturists.
