= Mike Towell =

Scottish boxer

Personal information
- Nickname: Iron Mike
- Born: 12 September 1991 Dundee, Scotland
- Died: 30 September 2016 (aged 25) Glasgow, Scotland
- Weight: Welterweight

Boxing career
- Stance: Orthodox

Boxing record
- Total fights: 13
- Wins: 11
- Win by KO: 8
- Losses: 1
- Draws: 1

Mike Towell (12 September 1991 – 30 September 2016) was a Scottish professional boxer.

== Early and life ==
Towell was born on 12 September 1991 in Dundee, Scotland.

== Death ==
On 29 September 2016 Towell fought Dale Evans at the Radisson Blu Hotel in Glasgow where he suffered head injuries after being TKO'd in the fifth round of the scheduled 12 round fight. Afterwards he was taken to the Queen Elizabeth University Hospital where it was discovered he had serious bleeding to the brain which led to his death on 30 September 2016. It was reported that Towell had stopped sparring a few weeks before the fatal fight due to suffering with crippling migraines. On 12 October 2016, it was confirmed that Towell's funeral would take place at St Andrew's Cathedral in Dundee on 14 October 2016, two weeks after his death.

=== Reaction ===
Many members of the Boxing community expressed their condolences on social media following Towell's death. On 1 October 2016, Nathan Cleverly dedicated his WBA (Regular) light-heavyweight title fight win against Jürgen Brähmer to Towell. Ricky Hatton and Kris Carslaw both setup Justgiving pages in the days after Towell's death which had collectively raised £50,347 when pages were closed on 31 October 2016.

On 3 October 2016, Dale Evans told BBC Wales how he was "absolutely heartbroken" by the death of Towell as a result of their fight. In March 2017 Evans revealed that meeting Towell's mother had given him the strength to carry on.

On 5 October 2016, Matchroom Boxing promoter Eddie Hearn announced that for 24 hours on 6 October 2016, 100% of the ticket sales revenue to Ricky Burns world title defence fight on 7 October 2016 at The SSE Hydro in Glasgow will be donated to the Towell family. At the event Towell was given a ten bell tribute just before Burns fought Kiryl Relikh. On 11 October 2016, Hearn confirmed on Twitter that £3,720 was raised in ticket sales money for the Burns fight and that he would double the money raised bringing a total of £7,440 to pass on to the Towell family.

On 6 October 2016, the First Minister of Scotland, Nicola Sturgeon sent her condolences to Towell's family during her First Minister's Questions at the Scottish Parliament Building in Edinburgh.

Towell's life and death is the subject of Pete Carvill's book Death of a Boxer, published through Biteback Publishing.
