= List of the first women ordained as priests in the Church of England in 1994 =

On 12 March 1994, 32 women were ordained as Church of England priests for the first time in history. The service was officiated by Bishop Barry Rogerson at Bristol Cathedral.

Rogerson ordained the women in alphabetical order, so Angela Berners-Wilson was the very first woman to be ordained.

The youngest woman to be ordained was Karen MacKinnon at age 30, with Jean Kings being the second youngest. The oldest was 69.

In 2004 the tenth anniversary of the ordinations was celebrated at Bristol Cathedral and, by then, one of the priests had died and 14 had retired.

The 32 women ordained on the day were (list copied from the order of service):

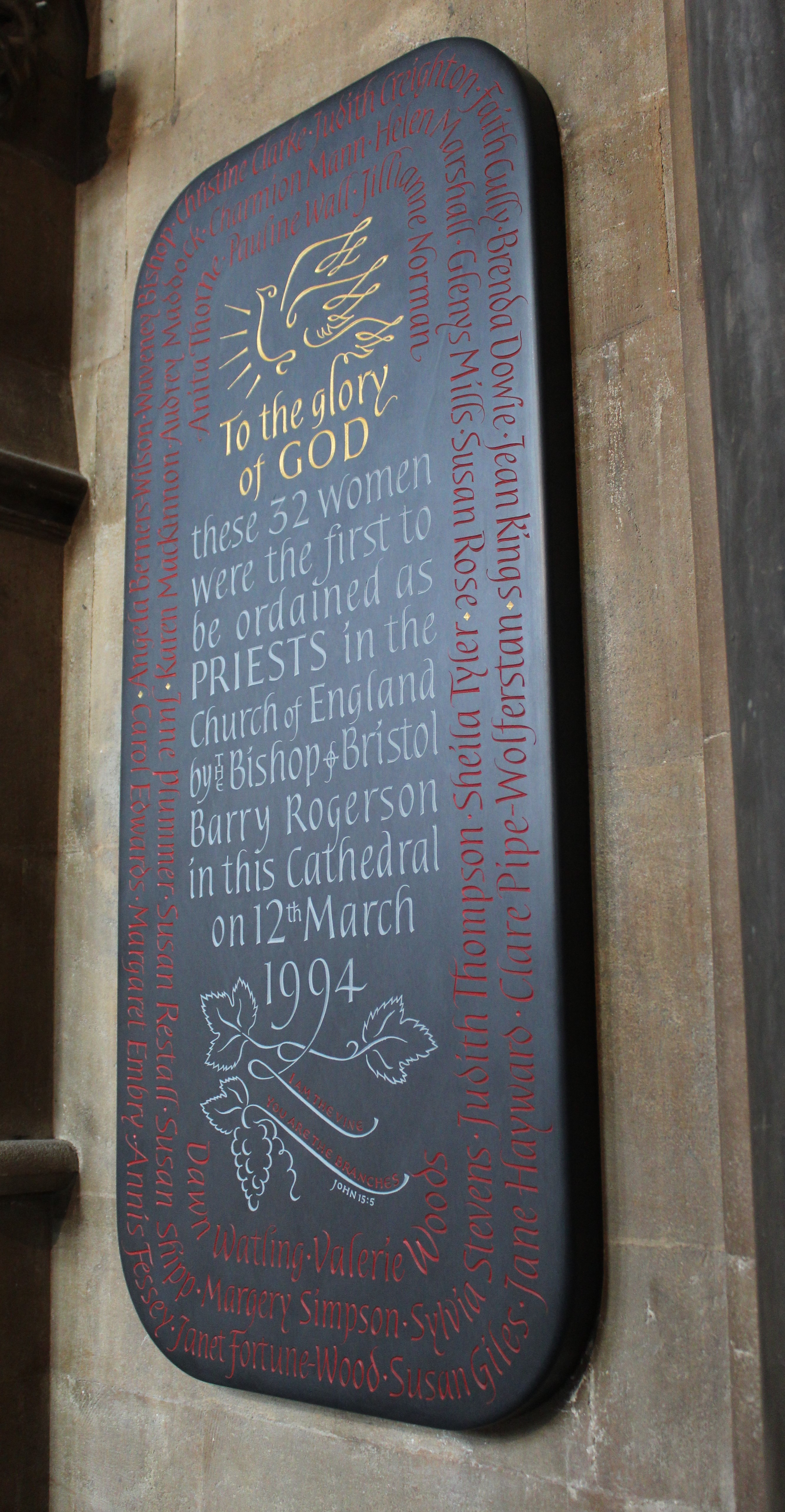
Ordination of women plaque, 2022, Bristol Cathedral

1. Angela Berners-Wilson, a university chaplain
2. Waveney Bishop
3. Christine Clarke
4. Judith Creighton
5. Faith Cully
6. Brenda Dowie
7. Carol Edwards, of St Christopher's, Brislington
8. Margaret Embry
9. Annis Fessey
10. Jan Fortune-Wood
11. Susan Giles
12. Jane Hayward
13. Jean Kings, part-time parish deacon who was also chaplain at University of the West of England
14. Karen MacKinnon, full-time parish deacon
15. Audrey Maddock
16. Charmion Mann
17. Helen Marshall
18. Glenys Mills, Christ's Church, Clifton
19. Jillianne Norman
20. Clare Pipe-Wolferstan
21. June Plummer
22. Susan Restall, St Mary's, Yate
23. Susan Rose
24. Susan Shipp
25. Margery Simpson
26. Sylvia Stevens
27. Judith Thompson
28. Anita Thorne
29. Sheila Tyler
30. Pauline Wall
31. Rosemary Dawn Watling, at the time a 61-year-old Anglican nun and deacon in a vicarage in Bristol
32. Valerie Woods, Vicar of Wood End in Coventry

In 1994 a plaque was installed in Bristol Cathedral to mark these first 32 women ordained as priests in the Church of England. In 2022 it was replaced with a new plaque that listed the names of the women rather than only the names of the men who carried out the ceremony. Both plaques were carved in Welsh slate. The plaque is located on the north side of the nave where it meets the transept. The women contributed to the cost of the original plaque. The new one, carved by Robyn Golden-Hann, was unveiled by the Bishop of Bristol, Vivienne Faull.

The officiating bishop believed it would take 10 years before the first woman would be ordained as a bishop. In fact, it took 21 years until Libby Lane became the first female bishop in the Church of England as Bishop of Stockport (a suffragan see in the Diocese of Chester) in January 2015 (announced on 17 December 2014). Lane had also been ordained as a priest in 1994. The first woman to be appointed diocesan bishop was the Right Reverend Rachel Treweek, Bishop of Gloucester, appointed on 26 March 2015. Treweek had been ordained as a priest in 1995.

== See also ==
- Ordination of women in the Anglican Communion
