= Billy Beechers =

English footballer

Personal information
- Full name: William Junior Beechers
- Date of birth: 1 June 1987 (age 39)
- Place of birth: Oxford, England
- Position: Striker

Youth career
- Oxford United

Senior career*
Years	Team	Apps	(Gls)
2004–2007	Oxford United	4	(0)
2006–2007	→ Oxford City (loan)		
2007–2010	Abingdon United		
2010–????	Oxford City		
- * Club domestic league appearances and goals

William Junior Beechers (born 1 June 1987) is an English former professional footballer.

== Biography ==
Born in Oxford, Beechers joined the youth team at Oxford United, making his debut as a 59th-minute substitute in a match at Lincoln City on 5 February 2005. After playing four league games, he was loaned to Oxford City in November 2006, but was recalled in January 2007. He was released by Oxford in May 2007 and signed for Abingdon United in July 2007. He remained at Abingdon until signing for Oxford City in 2010.
