= Jack Rippon =

Welsh cricketer

Personal information
- Full name: Thomas John Rippon
- Born: 6 July 1918; Swansea, Glamorgan, Wales
- Died: 29 December 1994 (aged 76); Swansea, Glamorgan, Wales
- Batting: Right-handed
- Role: Wicket-keeper

Domestic team information
- Years: Team
- 1947–1948: Glamorgan

Career statistics
Competition	FC
Matches	3
Runs scored	45
Batting average	22.50
100s/50s	–/–
Top score	30
Balls bowled	–
Wickets	–
Bowling average	–
5 wickets in innings	–
10 wickets in match	–
Best bowling	–
Catches/stumpings	–/3
- Source: Cricinfo, 14 January 2011

Thomas John Rippon (6 July 1918 – 29 December 1994) was a Welsh cricketer. Rippon was a right-handed batsman who played as a wicket-keeper. Rippon was during his time with Glamorgan, very much the understudy to Haydn Davies. He was born at Swansea, Glamorgan.

Rippon made his first-class debut for Glamorgan in 1947 against Warwickshire. He played two further first-class matches: In 1947 against Northamptonshire and in 1948 against Somerset. In his 3 first-class matches, he scored 45 runs at a batting average of 22.50, with a high score of 30. Behind the stumps he made 3 stumpings.
