= Angela Berners-Wilson =

Anglican woman priest

The Reverend Prebendary Angela Berners-Wilson
- Rector the Quantock Towers Benefice
- Church: Church of England
- Diocese: Diocese of Bath and Wells
- In office: 2016–2023
- Other post: Chaplain to the University of Bath (2004–2016)

Orders
- Ordination: 1987 (deacon); 1994 (priest)

Personal details
- Born: Angela Veronica Isabel Berners-Wilson; 1954 (age 71–72)
- Denomination: Anglicanism
- Education: University of St Andrews; Cranmer Hall, Durham

Angela Veronica Isabel Berners-Wilson (born 1954) is a Church of England priest and chaplain. She is considered to be the first woman to be ordained as a priest in the Church of England. She was chaplain at the University of Bath from 2004 to 2016, and was a rector of a multi-church benefice. She retired in 2023 and now lives in Bristol.

== Early life and education ==
Berners-Wilson was born in 1954. She studied divinity at the University of St Andrews, graduating with a Master of Theology (MTheol) degree in 1976. Although its name suggests otherwise, the MTheol from St Andrews is an undergraduate degree. In 1977, she entered Cranmer Hall, Durham, an Anglican theological college in the Open Evangelical tradition, to train for ministry.

== Ordained ministry ==
Berners-Wilson was made a deaconess in 1979. From 1979 to 1982, she was deaconess of Christ Church, Southgate in the Diocese of London. From 1982 to 1984, she served as deaconess at St Marylebone Parish Church, also in the diocese of London. Then began more than a decade as a university chaplain: at Thames Polytechnic from 1984 to 1991, and at the University of Bristol from 1991 to 1995.

Berners-Wilson was ordained in the Church of England as a deacon in 1987, the first year the C of E ordained women to the diaconate. She was ordained a priest on 12 March 1994. Due to her surname being alphabetically first in the list of the first 32 women ordained to the priesthood, she is considered the first woman to be ordained a priest in the C of E. The officiating bishop speculated that it would be 10 years before the first woman was appointed as a bishop.

Berners-Wilson was appointed chaplain to the University of Bath in May 2004. In February 2009 she was appointed a prebendary of Wells Cathedral. Sponsored by the Diocese of Bath and Wells, the University of Bath and the United Society for the Propagation of the Gospel, she had a month's sabbatical in China in June 2008. In 2016, she left the University of Bath, having been appointed rector of the Quantock Towers benefice.

== Personal life ==
Her father was the rector of the rural parish of Frant in East Sussex. She married solicitor Andrew Sillett on 19 May 1984.
