= Einir Jones =

- Born: 1950 (age 75–76); Anglesey, Wales
- Education: Bangor University
- Occupations: Poet, author
- Writing career
- Genre: Children's literature
- Notable works: Daeth Awst Daeth Nos, Gweld y Garreg Ateb, Rhwng Dau

Einir Jones (born 1950 in Anglesey) is a Welsh poet and adaptor of children's books.

In 1991, Jones won the Mold National Eisteddfod of Wales. She also worked as a judge at the Monmouthshire and District National Eisteddfod of Wales, 2016. She was educated at Bangor University and now lives in Ammanford, Carmarthenshire, with her husband the Rev. John Talfryn Jones, teaching at Amman Valley Comprehensive School.

== Works ==
Her works include Daeth Awst Daeth Nos (Night came in August, Barddas Publications, 1991), Gweld y Garreg Ateb (View the Stone Solution, Gwynedd Press, 1991) and Rhwng Dau (Between Two, co-written with Edward Jones, Pantycelyn Press, 1998).
