= Iorwerth Hughes =

Welsh footballer

Personal information
- Date of birth: 26 May 1925
- Place of birth: Wales
- Date of death: 20 August 1993 (aged 68)

International career
| Years | Team | Apps | (Gls) |
| 1950–1951 | Wales | 4 | (0) |

Iorwerth Hughes (26 May 1925 – 20 August 1993) was a Welsh international football goalkeeper.

Hughes was born in Abergele, and began his career with Llandudno in the 1948–49 season. He went on to play for Luton Town, Cardiff City and Newport County. He was part of the Wales national football team between 1950 and 1951, playing four matches. He played his first international match on 15 November 1950 against England and his last on 16 May 1951 against Switzerland.

== See also ==
- List of Wales international footballers (alphabetical)
