= Jordan Page (rugby union) =

English rugby union player (born 1987)

Jordan Page (born 11 March 1987) is an English former rugby union player for Leeds Tykes, Worcester Warriors and Stourbridge.
