= Tom Ailes =

English rugby union footballer

- Born: 13 November 1992 (age 34) Manchester, England
- Height: 1.91 m (6 ft 3 in)
- Weight: 108 kg (17 st 0 lb)

Rugby union career
- Position: No.8
- Current team: Sale Sharks
Senior career
Years	Team	Apps	(Points)
- Gloucester Rugby
–	Hartpury College		
–	Sale RFC		

Tom Ailes is an English professional rugby union player who plays for Gloucester and Gloucester U20. He is currently playing for Sale F.C.
