= Restless Nation =

Television series

Original release
- Network: BBC Scotland
- Release: 1991

Restless Nation was a BBC Scotland television series, first shown in 1991, prior to the UK general election in 1992, and updated in 1996, prior to the 1997 general election. It spawned a book by Alan Clements, Kenny Farquharson and Kirsty Wark, in collaboration with Scotland on Sunday, published in 1996.

An analysis of the history of the movement for Scottish self-government, the TV series and the book were based on political interviews and archive material of political events since 1945.

The title of the series was a play on the name of the 1985 film Restless Natives.

== See also ==
- Politics of Scotland
