= Dillwyn Thomas =

Welsh cricketer

Personal information
- Full name: Dillwyn Thomas
- Born: 13 February 1905; Neath Abbey, Glamorgan, Wales
- Died: 29 August 1996 (aged 91); Neath, Glamorgan, Wales
- Batting: Right-handed
- Bowling: Right-arm medium-fast

Domestic team information
- Years: Team
- 1939: Glamorgan

Career statistics
Competition	FC
Matches	2
Runs scored	14
Batting average	14.00
100s/50s	–/–
Top score	14*
Balls bowled	216
Wickets	5
Bowling average	19.80
5 wickets in innings	1
10 wickets in match	–
Best bowling	5/64
Catches/stumpings	1/–
- Source: Cricinfo, 30 June 2010

Dillwyn Thomas (13 February 1905 – 29 August 1996) was a Welsh cricketer. Thomas was a right-handed batsman who bowled right-arm medium-fast. He was born at Neath Abbey, Glamorgan.

Thomas made his first-class debut for Glamorgan in 1939 against Essex, where on debut he took his only five-wicket haul in first-class cricket, claiming figures of 5/64; this five wicket haul also accounted for all of his first-class wickets. He played a further first-class match for the county, against Yorkshire in the same season at Park Avenue Cricket Ground, Bradford.

Thomas died at Neath, Glamorgan on 29 August 1996.
