= David Blackmore (cricketer) =

Welsh cricketer

David Blackmore (19 December 1909 – 15 June 1988) was a Welsh cricketer. He was a right-handed batsman who played first-class cricket for Glamorgan. He was born and died in Swansea.

Blackmore, who played on a regular basis for Swansea Cricket Club, made just one first-class appearance, in 1934 against Somerset, and while he made 34 runs with the bat, this was to prove to be his only innings in Glamorgan colours.

Ten years later, Blackmore would appear for a West of England XI in a friendly match against Glamorgan.
