= Thomas David Frank Evans =

British Army soldier

- Born: 1917; Llanwnnen, Lampeter in Wales
- Died: 1996; Aberystwyth
- Other names: Frank Evans
- Known for: Prisoner of War, Author
- Notable work: Roll Call at Oeyama, P.O.W. Remembers

Thomas David Frank Evans (1917–1996) was a British soldier during World War II, during which he was also a prisoner of war of the Japanese Army. He published his memoirs in Welsh and English in the 1980s.

== Biography ==
Frank Evans was born in 1917 in Llanwnnen, Lampeter in Wales. He was dispatched to the Crown Colony of Hong Kong as a member of the British Army (Royal Army Pay Corps) in 1941. As a result of the Battle of Hong Kong in December 1941, he was captured by the Japanese Army and interned at the Sham Shui Po and Argyle Street POW camps in Hong Kong and later transferred to the Oeyama POW Camp, Iwataki Town, Yoza-gun, Kyoto Prefecture where he was forced to work in the open-pit nickel mine in Kaya and the smelting factory in Iwataki together with nearly 700 POW's from countries such as the UK, Canada, Australia and the USA.

The POW's were released from the camp in September 1945 after the defeat of Japan in the Pacific War and Frank Evans returned to Wales in November. Nearly ten per cent of the POW's in the Oeyama camp had died of malnutrition, hard labour and torture when the war was over.

He privately published his memoirs in Welsh in 1981 and later in English in 1985 with the title Roll Call at Oeyama, P.O.W. Remembers.

Evans visited the former Oeyama POW camp site for the first time since the end of World War II in 1984 and had a memorial for his comrades erected at the former nickel mine site with cooperation from the Town of Kaya (now a part of Town of Yosano) and Nippon Yakin Company Ltd. After an invitation from Evans, Mayor Takuichi Hosoi of Kaya visited Aberystwyth in 1985. This enabled the two municipalities to establish exchange programs for their respective high school students and citizens.

Evans died in Aberystwyth in 1996.

== Roll Call at Oeyama, P.O.W. Remembers ==
The English version of Evans' memoirs, Roll Call at Oeyama, P.O.W. Remembers, is known as one of the important accounts of POW's experience in Hong Kong and Japan. It is also quite unique as it combines his memories from World War II and the process of post-war reconciliation between his former enemies and himself as a result of his 1984 visit to Japan.

It is quoted in Long Night's Journey into Day by Dr. Charles G. Roland (Wilfrid Laurier University Press, 2001) and in We shall Suffer There by Tony Banham (Hong Kong University Press, March 2009). It is also quoted in an English language textbook in Japan for senior high school students by the Kairyudo Press and in Amerika Kokka Hangyaku-zai (A Case of Treason in the (Post-War) USA) in Japanese by Tetsuro Shimojima (Kodansha Press, Tokyo, 1993).

The book deals with Tomoya Kawakita who was convicted of treason after World War II for his acts against US POW's as an interpreter at the Oeyama nickel mine.
