= Santa Special =

Christmas rail service

A Santa Special is a special Christmas rail service, common on heritage steam railways (or sometimes on mainline railways, as is done by the RPSI in Ireland), where children are given the opportunity to meet "Santa Claus".

The revenues derived from Santa Specials make an important contribution to the finances of the railways as they attract large numbers of families during the off-peak winter period.

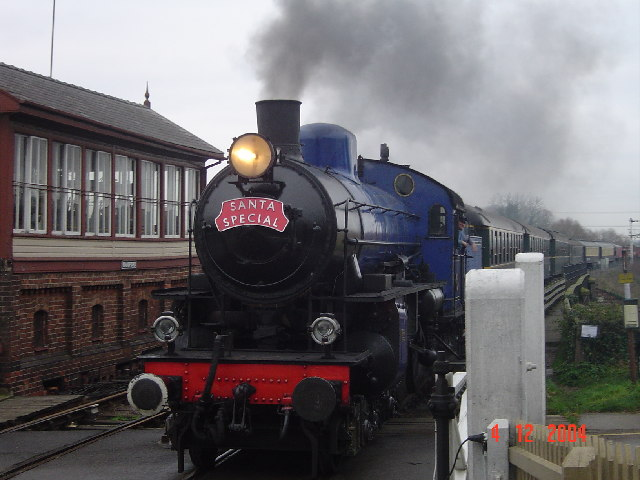
Swedish 'B' Class No.101 hauling a Santa special on the Nene Valley Railway

Common features of Santa Special services are

- Meeting "Santa Claus" (This commonly, but not always, takes place on the train)
- Each child receiving a gift from "Santa Claus"
- Refreshments provided for adults - for example, a Mince Pie and a Seasonal Drink
- Entertainment provided for adults and children - for example, Juggling and Balloon Sculpting

== See also ==
- List of British heritage and private railways
