= Rhodri Hughes =

- Born: Rhodri Hughes; 26 November 1993 (age 32) Swansea, Wales
- Height: 196 cm (6 ft 5 in)
- Weight: 110 kg (17 st 5 lb)
- School: Gower College Swansea

Rugby union career
- Position: Lock
- Current team: Ospreys
Senior career
Years	Team	Apps	(Points)
2012-	Ospreys	10	(0)
- Correct as of 20:59, 11 October 2015 (UTC)
International career
Years	Team	Apps	(Points)
- Wales U20

Rhodri Hughes (born 26 November 1993) is a Welsh rugby union player who plays for Ospreys regional team as a lock. He was also a Wales under-20 international.

Hughes made his debut for the Ospreys regional team in 2012 having previously played for the Ospreys academy, Aberavon RFC, Hendy RFC, Swansea RFC and Bridgend Ravens.
