= George Bacon (cricketer) =

English cricketer (born 1992)

George Peter William Bacon (born 16 September 1992 in Nottingham) is an English List A cricketer active 2013 who played for Nottinghamshire.
