= Aubrey Davies =

Welsh cricketer

Personal information
- Full name: David Aubrey Davies
- Born: 11 July 1915; Swansea, Glamorgan, Wales
- Died: 25 July 1994 (aged 79); Exeter, Devon, England
- Batting: Right-handed
- Bowling: Leg break googly

Domestic team information
- Years: Team
- 1946–1950: Devon
- 1934–1938: Glamorgan

Career statistics
Competition	First-class
Matches	46
Runs scored	600
Batting average	12.50
100s/50s	–/1
Top score	55
Balls bowled	1,115
Wickets	14
Bowling average	54.28
5 wickets in innings	–
10 wickets in match	–
Best bowling	3/36
Catches/stumpings	28/–
- Source: Cricinfo, 18 April 2011

David Aubrey Davies (11 July 1915 – 24 July 1994) was a Welsh cricketer. Davies was a right-handed batsman who bowled leg break googly. He was born in Swansea, Glamorgan.

Davies made his first-class debut for Glamorgan in the 1934 County Championship against Leicestershire. He played first-class cricket for Glamorgan from 1934 to 1938, making 46 appearances. A batsman, Davies scored 600 runs at a batting average of 12.50, with a single half century high score of 55. His highest first-class score came against Surrey in 1937. Occasionally called upon to bowl, he took 14 wickets at a bowling average of 54.28, with best figures of 3/63. His best bowling figures came against Warwickshire in Glamorgan's opening match of 1938. Incidentally, Warwickshire were the team he bowled the most against in first-class cricket.

Following the Second World War, Davies joined Devon, making his debut for the county in the 1946 Minor Counties Championship against Oxfordshire. He continued to play Minor counties cricket for Devon until 1950.

Davies died in Exeter, Devon on 25 July 1994, but was not afforded an obituary in the 1995 Wisden Cricketers' Almanack.
