= Bessie Watson =

Scottish child suffragette and piper

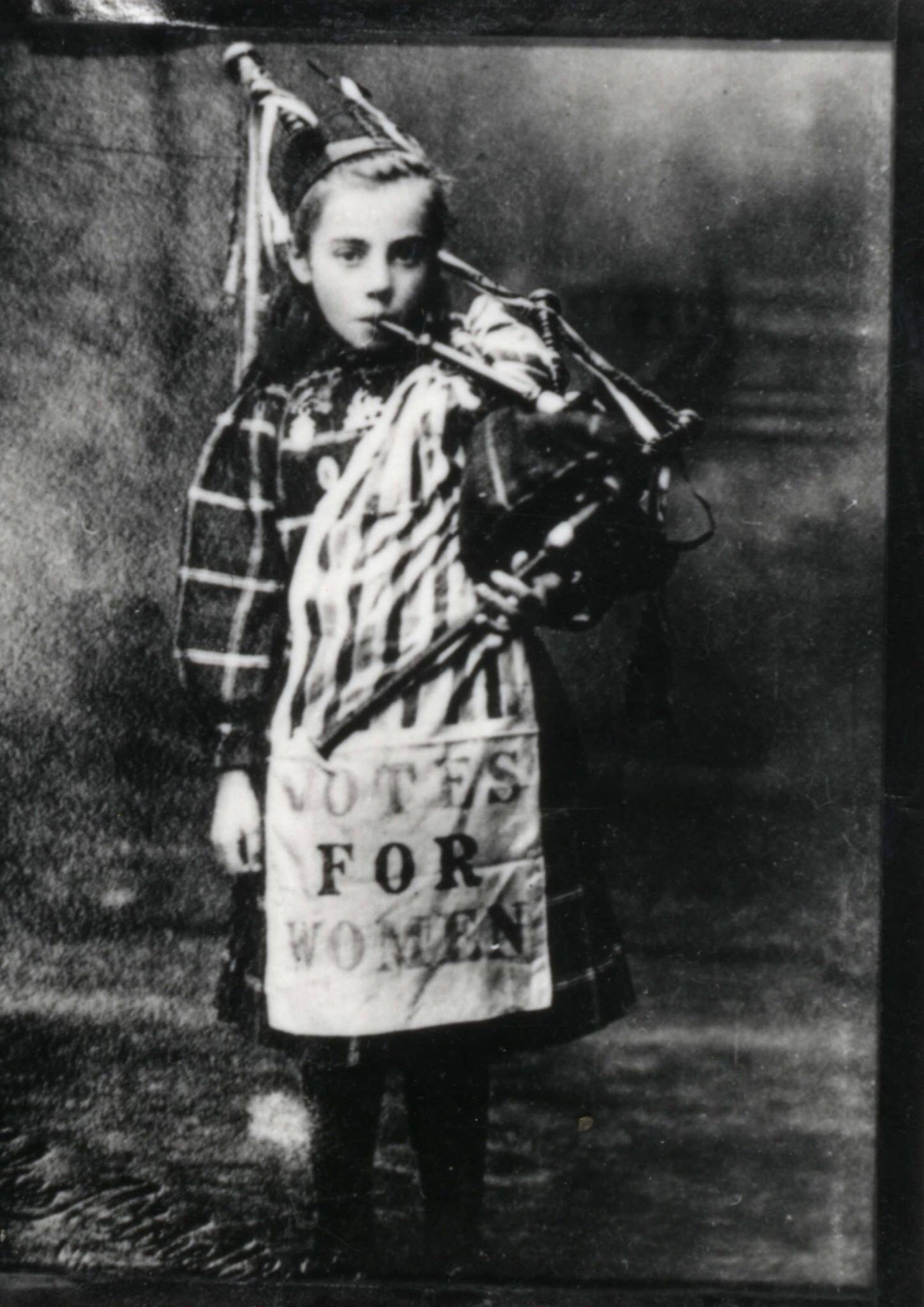
- Elizabeth Watson, aged nine
- Born: 13 July 1900; Vennel, Edinburgh, Scotland
- Died: 27 June 1992 (aged 91); Edinburgh, Scotland
- Occupation: School teacher
- Known for: Scottish child suffragette and piper
- Parents: Horatio Watson (father); Agnes Newton (mother)

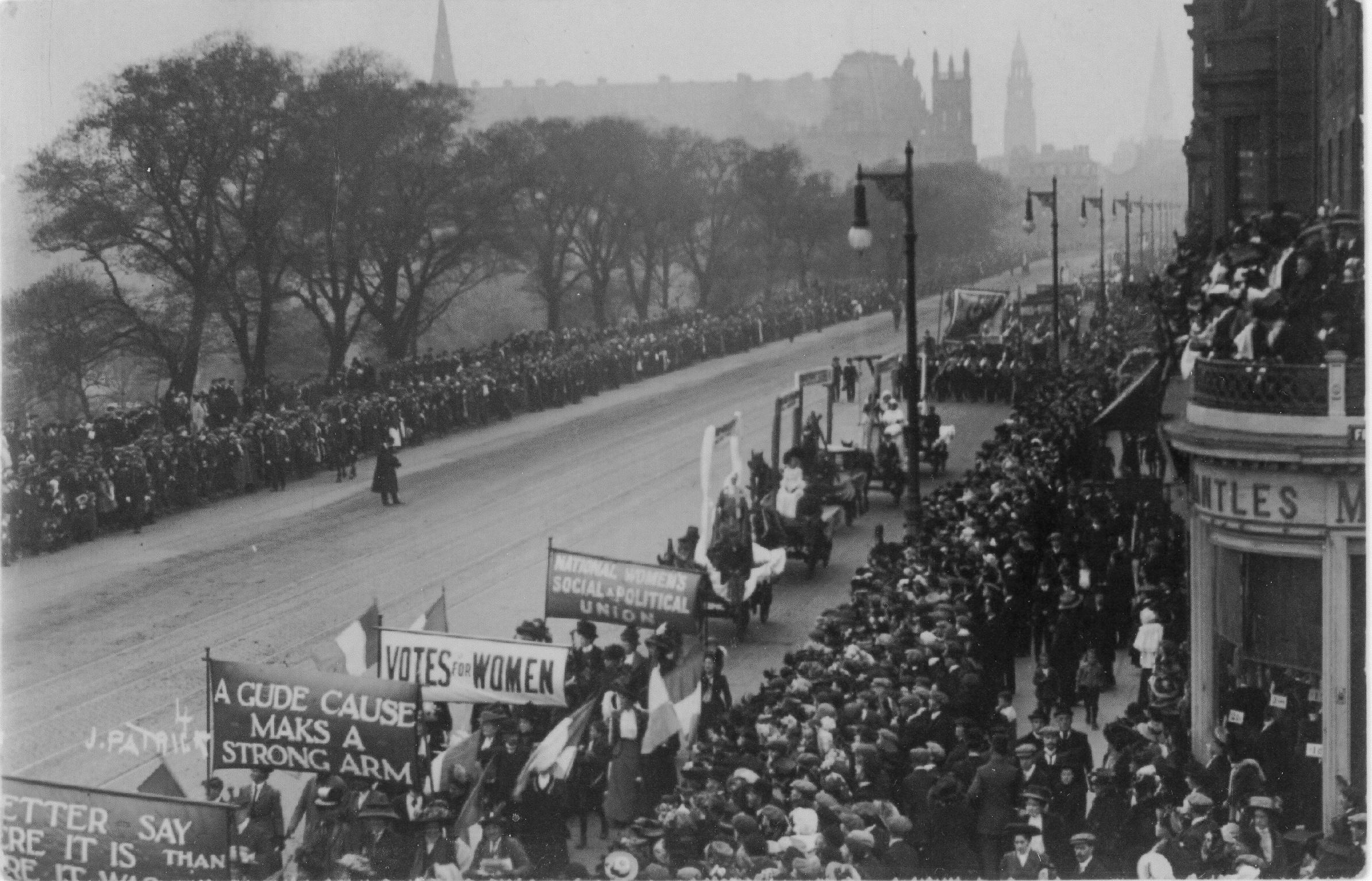
"The Great Procession and Women's Demonstration", 1909 on Princes Street, Edinburgh

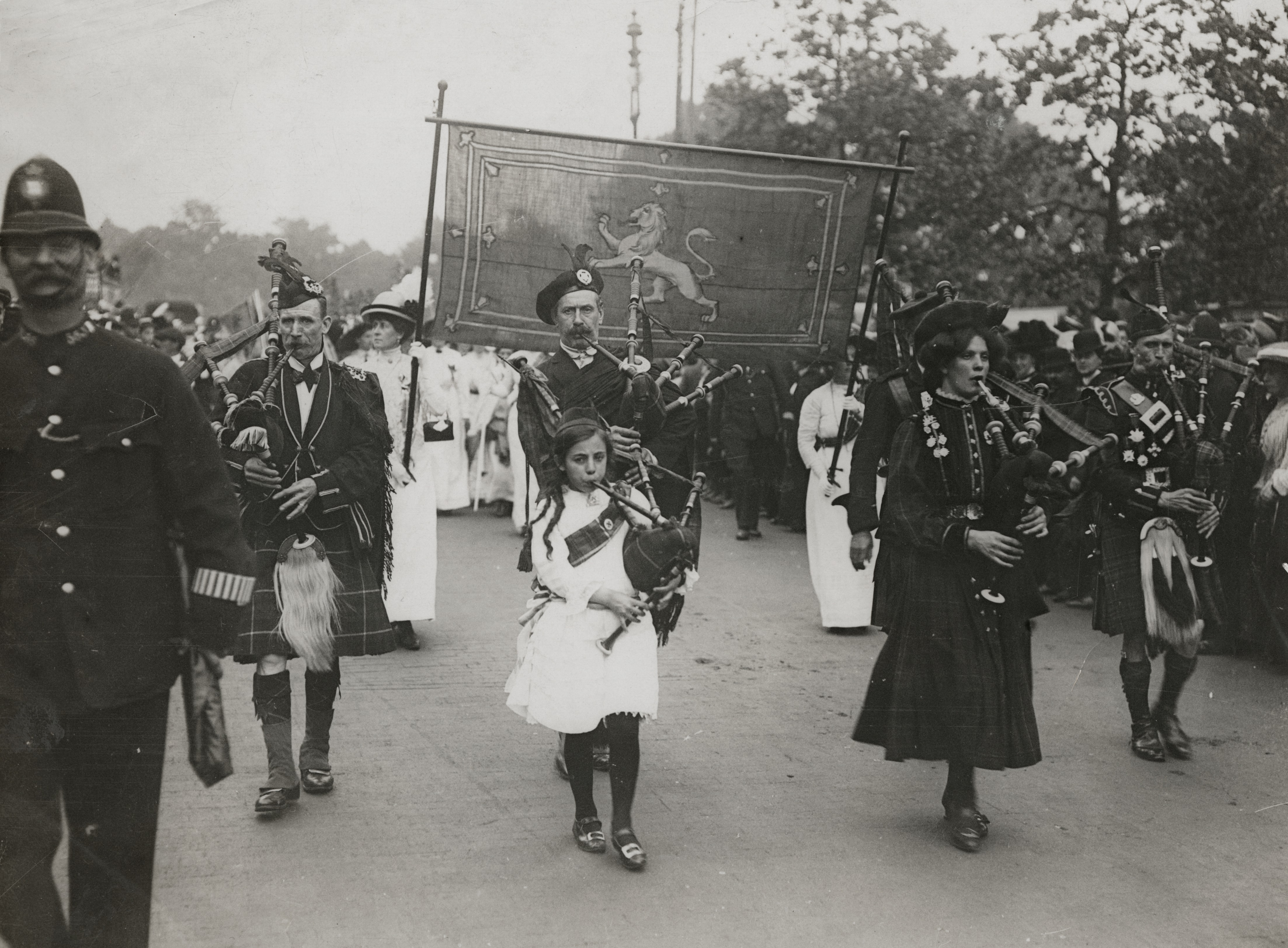
Photograph, printed, paper, monochrome, a procession of suffragettes led by a woman in a tartan dress, a small girl and three men in kilts all playing bagpipes.

Elizabeth Watson (13 July 1900 – 27 June 1992) was a Scottish child suffragette and piper.

== Early life ==
Watson was born at 11 Vennel, Edinburgh on 13 July 1900, the daughter of Agnes Newton and Horatio Watson, a bookbinder for George Watson's printing company. Watson was encouraged to take up piping at the age of seven or eight as her parents hoped it would strengthen her lungs against tuberculosis after her aunt Margaret died of the disease. Her first set of pipes was a half sized set made by Robertson, the pipe maker.

== Involvement with suffragette campaign ==
After seeing an advert for a pageant of historical Scottish women organised by Flora Drummond and the Women's Social and Political Union, Watson and her mother joined the WSPU and Watson, at the age of nine, was invited to play the pipes in the pageant. The procession, which celebrated "What women have done and can and will do", took place in Edinburgh on 9 October 1909 and marched down Princes Street before gathering for a rally led by Emmeline Pankhurst at Waverley Market. Watson rode on a float beside a woman dressed as Isabella McDuff, Countess of Buchan in her cage. Several weeks later when Christabel Pankhurst came to Edinburgh to attend a meeting in the King's Theatre, she presented Watson with a brooch depicting Boudica in her chariot. In 1979 Bessie gave this brooch to Margaret Thatcher, the first woman to be elected as Prime Minister of the UK.

Two years after the pageant Watson was invited to lead the Scottish "lady" pipers at the Great Pageant in London on 17 June 1911. Later that same year, when King George V came to Edinburgh on a state visit, Watson led the 2nd Edinburgh Company of the Girl Guides and was recognised by the King as she raised the salute.

Watson continued to be actively involved in the Suffragette movement and wore hair ribbons in the colours of the Suffragette campaign to school. She played the pipes on the platform of Waverley Station as trains departed taking convicted women's rights campaigners to Holloway Prison, and she piped outside Calton Jail to encourage the Suffragettes imprisoned there.

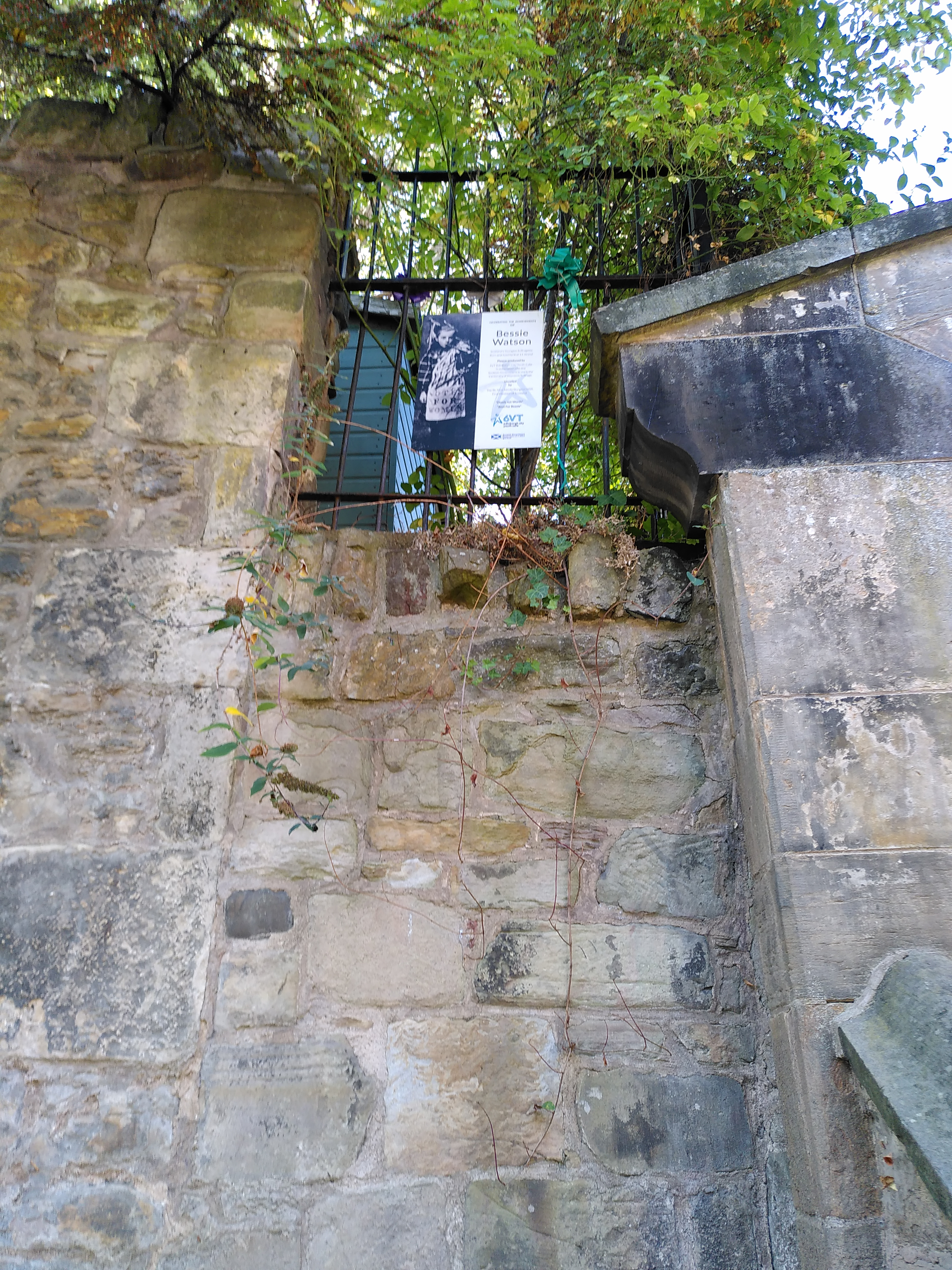
Memorial Plaque to Bessie Watson at 11, Vennel Edinburgh

A century later this location is now St Andrew's House, home of the Scottish Ministers and civil servants. Scotland's First Minister Nicola Sturgeon on 1 August 2019 unveiled a memorial plaque to Watson at her home in the Vennel. The plaque included a photo or Watson and an inscription:

CELEBRATING THE ACHIEVEMENTS OF

Bessie Watson

Scotland's Youngest Suffragette Born and lived here at 11 Vennel

Plaque produced by. 6VT Edinburgh City Youth Cafe in association with the Scottish Government to mark the Centenary of Women's Suffrage

Unveiled by.

The Right Honourable Nicola Sturgeon MSP, First Minister of Scotland.

"Deeds not Words"

"Best For Bessie".

6VT - Scottish Government

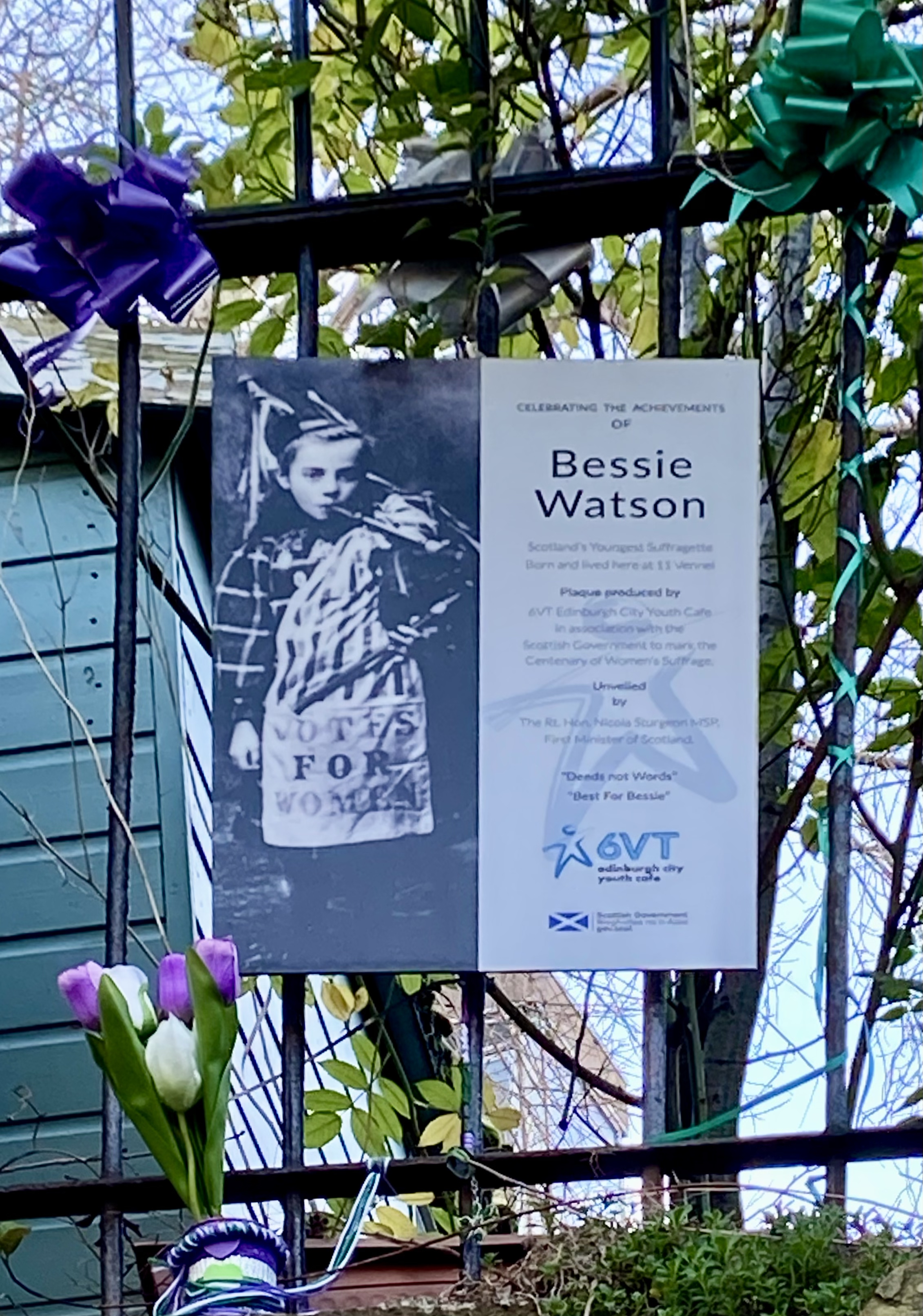
Memorial plaque to Bessie Watson at Vennel, Edinburgh

The First Minister Ms Sturgeon said "I go into work in the morning to the place where Bessie would have played and knowing that I go in there now as the first woman to be First Minister of Scotland."

== Piping career ==
Watson became the only female member of the Highland Pipers' Society at the age of 14, and won a number of piping awards. She also founded the Broughton School Pipe Band, which she led for 27 years. Watson continued to play the pipes daily into her late 80s.

Watson studied French at the University of Edinburgh, and taught violin and modern languages in schools across the city. In 1926 Watson moved to Trinity, Edinburgh with her parents, and in 1945, at the end of World War II, she married John Somerville an electrical contractor.

Watson died in Edinburgh in 1992, at age 91. She left her autobiography, practice chanter and pipes to the College of Piping in Glasgow.

As well as a piper, Watson was also a Highland dancer-performing for example at a Women's Patriotic Service League Garden fete in 1915.

Also in 1915, Watson was presented with a silver chanter memento for the two years in which she had played the bagpipes at recruiting events. According to The Scotsman, she had "rendered excellent service". The memento was presented by Major Robertson VC.

== Further Information ==
In 2019, Edinburgh 6VT Youth Cafe members researched and produced a book about Watson's life entitled "Best for Bessie: Scotland's youngest suffragette". The then First Minister, Nicola Sturgeon contributed a foreword to the publication.
