= Scottish Lobby =

- Presented by: John Foster; Iain Macwhirter

Production
- Producer: BBC Scotland News
- Production locations: Glasgow, Scotland

Original release
- Network: BBC Two Scotland
- Release: 19 January 1992 – 6 June 1999

Scottish Lobby was a current affairs programme broadcast on BBC Two Scotland during the 1990s on Sunday lunchtimes and occasionally on Saturday evenings for most of its run, The programme ran from 19 January 1992 to 6 June 1999 when it was replaced by Holyrood.

== Past presenters and reporters ==
- John Foster (1992 – 1997)
- Iain Macwhirter (1997 – 1999)

== See also ==
- BBC Scotland
- BBC News
