= Lyn Thomas (footballer) =

Welsh footballer (1920–1993)

Personal information
- Full name: David Stuart Lynne Thomas
- Date of birth: 19 September 1920
- Place of birth: Swansea, Wales
- Date of death: 21 April 1993 (aged 72)
- Place of death: Waltham Forest, England
- Position: Forward

Senior career*
Years	Team	Apps	(Gls)
19??–1942	Abercregan Juniors		
1942–1947	Swansea Town	0	(0)
1947–1949	Brighton & Hove Albion	13	(4)
1949–1951	Folkestone Town		
1951	Margate	1	(0)
- * Club domestic league appearances and goals

David Stuart Lynne Thomas (19 September 1920 – 21 April 1993), known as Lyn or Dai Thomas, was a Welsh professional footballer who played as a forward in the Football League for Brighton & Hove Albion.

== Life and career ==
Thomas was born in Swansea in 1920. He was a schoolboy international, and joined Swansea Town from Abercregan Juniors in 1942. During the Second World War, he made guest appearances for clubs including Accrington Stanley, Blackpool, Swindon Town, Wrexham, and Dundee United. He never played first-team football for Swansea, and signed for Brighton & Hove Albion of the Third Division South in 1947. Although he scored on debut, Thomas soon dropped out of consideration, but came back into the team on the wing, and finished the season with four goals from fourteen appearances. He spent the following season in the reserves, and left the club on a free transfer at the end of it, going on to play for Kent League clubs Folkestone Town and (very briefly) Margate. Thomas died in Waltham Forest, London, in 1993 at the age of 72.
