= Cadenza (choir) =

Scottish chamber choir

Cadenza is a mixed-voice chamber choir based in Edinburgh, Scotland. The choir was formed in 1992 and quickly gained a reputation for a high standard of performance, winning the Scotland and North England heat of the Sainsbury's Choir of the Year competition in 1996 and 1998. The current musical director is Timothy Coleman.

Cadenza perform several concerts throughout the year, with the major event of the season being a performance of a major choral work – often accompanied by an orchestra and professional soloists – in the Edinburgh Festival Fringe in August each year. Such performances have received high praise from the press, notably Conrad Wilson of the Glasgow Herald, who reviewed the 2005 and the 2006 concert, which contained the Edinburgh premiere of Jan Dismas Zelenka's Missa dei Filii.
