= Robert Roland Hughes =

British neurologist

Robert Roland Hughes FRCP

Personal details
- Born: 1911
- Died: 18 March 1991 (aged 79–80)
- Occupation: Neurologist

Robert Roland Hughes (1911 – 18 March 1991) was a British neurologist and pioneer of Electroencephalography and neurology. He studied medicine at Liverpool University and spent the bulk of his life as a consultant in the Liverpool and North Wales area, particularly in the Liverpool Royal Infirmary and the Royal Southern Hospital.

== Career ==
Hughes began his career as an apprentice printer in his father's business, and entered medicine somewhat later than was usual. He served in the Royal Army Medical Corps during World War II, rising to the rank of Major, during which time he was instrumental in setting up the Allied field hospital at D-Day.

He took up a post in under Lord Cohen at the Royal Southern Hospital after being demobilised. He also worked at Walton Neurological Unit, Clatterbridge, HM Stanley and Boddelwyddan. Dr Hughes wrote the landmark book An introduction to clinical electro-encephalography (1961) which is used as a textbook and authority on the subject. As his reputation became established, he did a substantial amount of work as a private medico-legal consultant.

Hughes' son, Dr Simon H. C. Hughes, is a medical physicist whose work on CT and MRI scanners helped reduce their cost, making such equipment more available and widespread.
