= 1989 in Scottish television =

This is a list of events in Scottish television from 1989.

== Events ==
=== January ===
- 7 January – BBC Scotland launches an extended Saturday teatime results programme. Rather than opting out of the last few minutes of Grandstand, the programme, called Afternoon Sportscene, runs for the entire duration of the time allocated for the day's results, starting at some point between 1 and 5 minutes before the network aired English counterpart Final Score.
- January – Scottish Television launches a new set of idents.

=== February ===
- 5 February – The world's first commercial DBS system, Sky Television, goes on air in the United Kingdom.

=== March ===
- 15 March – BBC1 airs John's Not Mad, an edition of the QED documentary strand which shadowed John Davidson, a 15-year-old from Galashiels in Scotland, with severe Tourette syndrome. The film explores John's life in terms of his family and the close-knit community around him, and how they all cope with a misunderstood condition.

=== April ===
- 20 April – John Leslie becomes the first Scottish presenter of Blue Peter.

=== May ===
- 20 May – Arthur Montford presents his final edition of Scotsport after 32 years with live coverage of the Scottish Cup final.

=== August ===
- 6 August – After being a co-host on the show last season, Jim White takes on the main presenting role on Scotsport replacing the now-retired Arthur Montford.
- 25 August – Rupert Murdoch delivers the MacTaggart Memorial Lecture at the Edinburgh International Television Festival in which he launches an attack on the narrow elitism within the British television industry.

=== September ===
- 1 September - The first ITV generic look is introduced. All three regions adopt the look, but Scottish drops it in December.

=== December ===
- December – The controversial Broadcasting Bill is introduced into Parliament by the Government. It will pave the way for the deregulation of commercial television.

== Debuts ==
=== BBC ===
- Unknown - The Singing Kettle (1989-1993)

=== ITV ===
- 11 February - (Australia) Home and Away (1988–present)
- 24 February - Fun House (1989–1999)

== Television series ==
- Scotsport (1957–2008)
- Reporting Scotland (1968–1983; 1984–present)
- Top Club (1971–1998)
- Scotland Today (1972–2009)
- Sportscene (1975–present)
- The Beechgrove Garden (1978–present)
- Grampian Today (1980–2009)
- Take the High Road (1980–2003)
- Taggart (1983–2010)
- James the Cat (1984–1992)
- Crossfire (1984–2004)
- City Lights (1984–1991)
- The Campbells (1986–1990)
- Naked Video (1986–1991)
- Wheel of Fortune (1988–2001)

== Births ==
- 18 June - Jordan Smith, actor

== Deaths ==
- 17 December - Edward Boyd, 73, radio and television writer

== See also ==
- 1989 in Scotland
