= 1990 in Scottish television =

This is a list of events in Scottish television from 1990.

== Events ==
=== May ===
- 10 May – The Broadcasting Act 1990 receives its third reading in the House of Commons and is passed with 259 votes to 180.

=== June ===
- 20 June – Archie MacPherson commentates his last football match for BBC Scotland with the Scotland v Brazil World Cup match in Italy. Brazil won 1-0, leaving Scotland eliminated from the finals.

=== July ===
- 27 July – Stereo transmissions begin from the Durris transmitting station.

=== August ===
- 25 August – Jock Brown transfers from Scotsport to BBC Scotland to replace Archie MacPherson as Sportscene's lead football commentator. Jock is replaced at Scotsport by Gerry McNee.

=== October ===
- 15 October – BBC1 launches a new weekday morning service called Daytime UK. Linked live from Birmingham and running for four hours, from 8.50am until lunchtime, the new service includes hourly Scottish news summaries, broadcast after the on-the-hour network news bulletins.

=== November ===
- November – The Broadcasting Act 1990 receives Royal Assent. The Act paves the way for the deregulation of the British commercial broadcasting industry, and will have many consequences for the ITV system.

=== Unknown ===
- Scottish Television introduces a supplementary ident adding to the ITV generic logo. It features several circles rolling in over the thistle and falling over as one to reveal the name Scottish Television.

== Debuts ==
=== BBC2 ===
- 18 September – Over the Moon with Mr Boon (1990–1996)

=== ITV ===
- 20 January – Win, Lose or Draw (1990–2004)

== Television series ==
- Scotsport (1957–2008)
- Reporting Scotland (1968–1983; 1984–present)
- Top Club (1971–1998)
- Scotland Today (1972–2009)
- Sportscene (1975–present)
- The Beechgrove Garden (1978–present)
- Grampian Today (1980–2009)
- Take the High Road (1980–2003)
- Taggart (1983–2010)
- James the Cat (1984–1992)
- Crossfire (1984–2004)
- City Lights (1984–1991)
- Naked Video (1986–1991)
- Wheel of Fortune (1988–2001)
- Fun House (1989–1999)

== Ending this year ==
- September – The Campbells (1986–1990)

== Deaths ==
- 17 March - Paul Kermack, 58, actor (Take the High Road)

== See also ==
- 1990 in Scotland
