= Jeff Stoutland =

American football player and coach (born 1962)

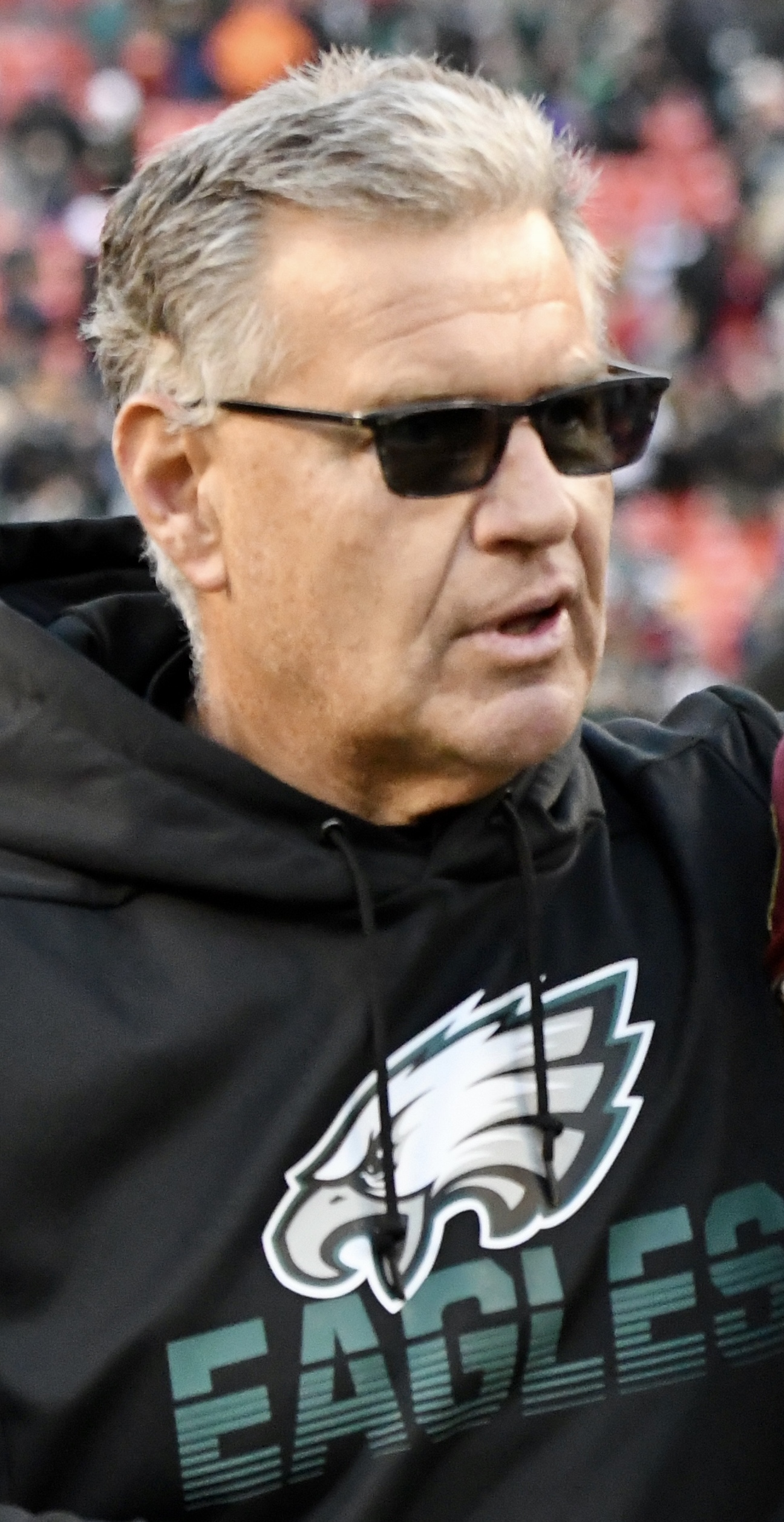
- Stoutland in 2019

Personal information
- Born: February 10, 1962 (age 64); Staten Island, New York, U.S.

Career information
- Position: Linebacker
- High school: Port Richmond (Staten Island, New York)
- College: Southern Connecticut

Career history
- Southern Connecticut (1984–1985) Linebackers coach; Syracuse (1986–1987) Graduate assistant; Southern Connecticut (1988–1992) Offensive coordinator; Cornell (1993–1996) Offensive line coach; Syracuse (1997–1999) Offensive line coach; Michigan State (2000–2006) Offensive line coach; Miami (FL) (2007–2010); Offensive line coach (2007-2010); Interim head coach (2010); Alabama (2011–2012) Offensive line coach; Philadelphia Eagles (2013–2025); Offensive line coach (2013–2017); Offensive line coach & run game coordinator (2018–2025)

Awards and highlights
- 2× Super Bowl champion (LII, LIX); 2× BCS national champion (2011, 2012)

Head coaching record
- Career: 0–1 (.000)

Jeff Stoutland (born February 10, 1962) is an American professional football coach who most recently served as the offensive line coach for the Philadelphia Eagles of the National Football League (NFL) from 2013 to 2025. He served as the interim head football coach for the University of Miami in 2010.

== Playing career ==
Stoutland was a four-year letterman and three-year starter at inside linebacker for head coach Kevin Gilbride at Southern Connecticut State, where he earned Little All-America honors as a senior while acting as team captain. He graduated in 1984 with a bachelor's degree in physical education.

== Coaching career ==
=== Early career ===
Stoutland began his coaching career at his alma mater, Southern Connecticut State, and coached inside linebackers for two seasons. He then served as a graduate assistant for Dick MacPherson for two years at Syracuse. He then returned to Southern Connecticut where he served as offensive coordinator until 1992. Stoutland then coached the offensive line at Cornell and Syracuse, before moving to Michigan State from 2000 until 2006. During his tenure at Michigan State, Stoutland helped develop six All-Big Ten selections, and led the Big Ten in fewest sacks allowed.

=== Miami ===
Stoutland spent the next four seasons at Miami as the offensive line coach. In 2010, the Hurricanes led the ACC in total offense and were third in rushing. On November 28, 2010, after Miami's head coach Randy Shannon was fired, Stoutland was named interim head coach for the team's bowl game. Miami lost 33-17 to Notre Dame in Stoutland's only game as head coach.

=== Alabama ===
On January 14, 2011, Stoutland was named Alabama's offensive line coach, after Joe Pendry retired. During his brief tenure as OL coach at Alabama, the Crimson Tide won consecutive BCS national championships over the LSU Tigers (2011) and Notre Dame Fighting Irish (2012) respectively.

=== Philadelphia Eagles ===
On February 7, 2013, Stoutland was hired by the Philadelphia Eagles as the offensive line coach under head coach Chip Kelly. In 2016, Stoutland was retained under new Eagles head coach Doug Pederson. Stoutland won his first Super Bowl ring when the Eagles defeated the New England Patriots in Super Bowl LII. On March 7, 2018, Stoutland was given an additional role as run game coordinator. In 2021, Stoutland was retained under the Eagles new head coach Nick Sirianni. On February 5, 2023, Stoutland and the Eagles agreed to a contract extension. He won a second Super Bowl championship when the Eagles won Super Bowl LIX over the Kansas City Chiefs.

Stoutland has been considered by some sportswriters to be among the best offensive line coaches in the NFL. As of the 2024 season, 8 Eagles offensive lineman have achieved a combined 26 Pro Bowl and 14 All-Pro honours during Stoutland's tenure with the team: offensive tackles Jason Peters, Lane Johnson, Jordan Mailata; offensive guards Evan Mathis, Brandon Brooks, Landon Dickerson; and centers Jason Kelce and Cam Jurgens.

One of his most notable achievements with the Eagles was his responsibility for scouting rugby player Jordan Mailata — who had never played American football in his life — and turning him into an All-Pro. In the Eagles' week 6 matchup against the Cowboys in 2022, Mailata starting using the term "Jeff Stoutland University" (from the suggestion of Lane Johnson) during his Sunday Night Football player introduction in acknowledgement of his lack of college football experience and the credit he owes to Stoutland. The term "Stoutland University" has since been embraced by the Eagles offensive linemen, and the team has sold merchandise of the term designed by Stoutland's daughter Madison.

Sirianni has also credited Stoutland for being one of the main inspirations for the Tush Push, a controversial play resembling a scrum where a quarterback would be pushed from behind by two players while the offensive line simultaneously moves forward to convert short yardage situations. It would be Stoutland who would contact Scottish rugby coach Richie Gray, with the intent to bring him in during the 2023 offseason to refine the play's technique.

The 2024 season especially cemented his reputation, as he was responsible for the turnaround of Mekhi Becton, and he coached running back Saquon Barkley to a record 2,504 combined rushing yards between the regular season and playoffs, which broke a prior NFL rushing record previously held by Terrell Davis since 1998.

On January 29, 2026, it was reported that Stoutland was expected to return to the Eagles in a reduced role and he would no longer be the run-game coordinator. However, on February 4, Stoutland announced he was leaving the Eagles organization after 13 seasons. "When I arrived here in 2013, I did not know what I was signing up for. I quickly learned what this city demands. But more importantly, what it gives back. The past 13 years have been [a] great privilege of my coaching career. I didn’t just work here, I became one of you. Stout out" he said in a statement on social media. According to ESPN and Adam Schefter, Stoutland is not expected to coach in 2026 and is expected to remain around the Eagles organization.

== Head coaching record ==
Year	Team	Overall	Conference	Standing	Bowl/playoffs
Miami Hurricanes (Atlantic Coast Conference) (2010)
2010	Miami	0–1 (Note: Served as interim head coach after Randy Shannon was fired at the end of the regular season.)			L Sun Bowl
Miami:		0–1			
Total:		0–1			
National championship Conference title Conference division title or championship game berth

== Personal life ==
Stoutland is married to his wife Allison. They have 2 kids; a son, Jake, and a daughter, Madison.

His wife has stated that in their household, the Eagles offensive linemen are considered part of their extended family. In describing her care for Jeff's players, Allison recalled how when she first met Jason Kelce's then-girlfriend Kylie after a win, she told her "If you f**k with him, I will kill you."
