= 1990 in Wales =

- Centuries: 18th; 19th; 20th; 21st
- Decades: 1970s; 1980s; 1990s; 2000s; 2010s
- See also: List of years in Wales; Timeline of Welsh history 1990 in The United Kingdom England Scotland Elsewhere

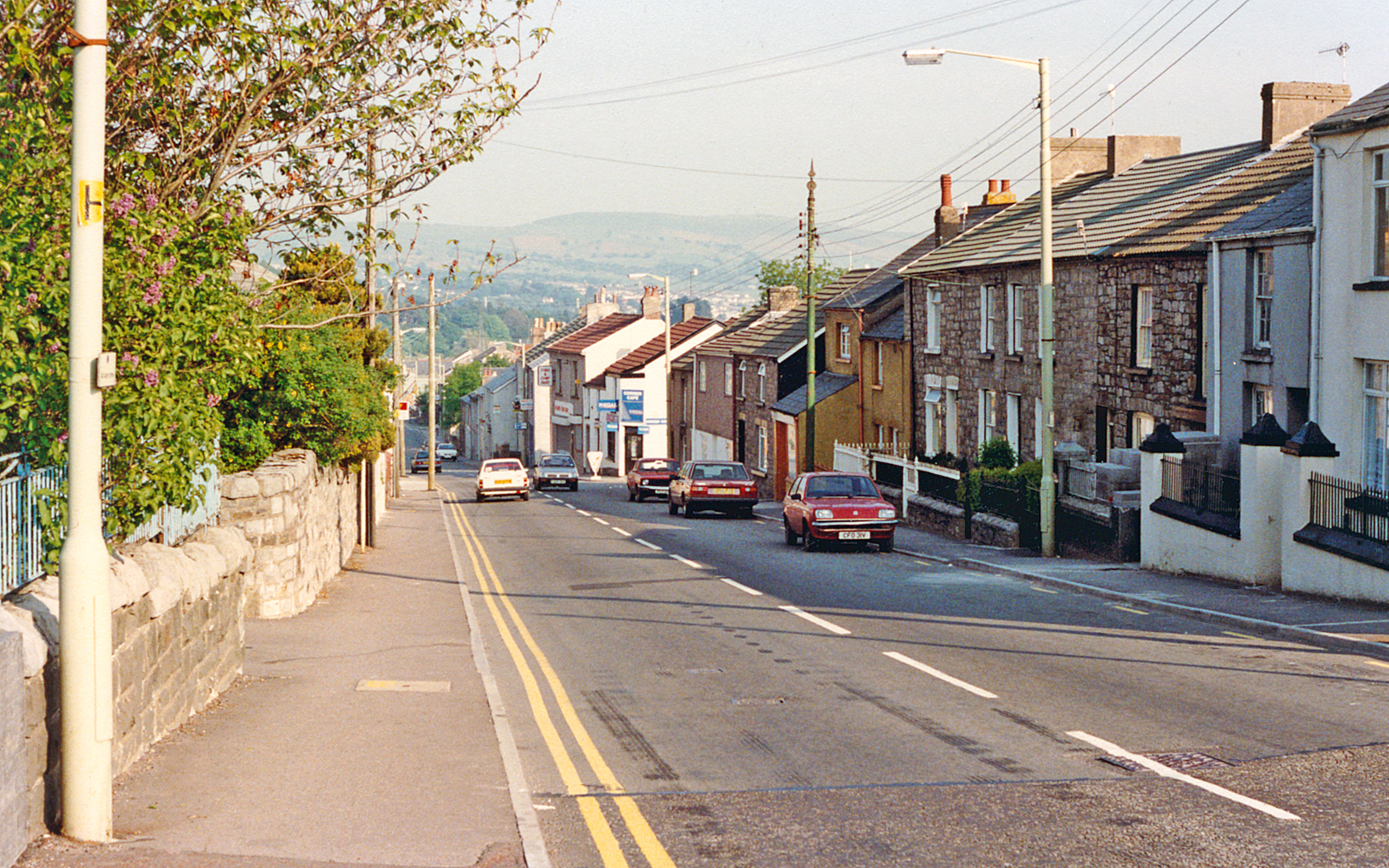
Cefn-y-Coed-y-Cymmer: High Street, 1990

This article is about the particular significance of the year 1990 to Wales and its people.

== Incumbents ==
- Secretary of State for Wales – Peter Walker (until 4 May); David Hunt
- Archbishop of Wales – George Noakes, Bishop of St David's
- Archdruid of the National Eisteddfod of Wales
  - Deudraeth (outgoing)
  - Ap Llysor (incoming)

== Events ==
- 26 February - The sea wall at Towyn is breached, resulting in flood damage to 2,800 homes, and the evacuation of a further 2,000.
- 10 June - Death of John Evans, Britain's oldest man whose age (112 years and 295 days) could be authenticated.
- 2 August - Highest ever temperature recorded in Wales until 2022, 35.2 °C (95.4 °F) at Hawarden.
- 27 September - Brymbo Steelworks last tapped.
- 1 November - Veteran Conservative politician Sir Geoffrey Howe resigns from the government.
- December - Privatisation of the former South Wales Electricity Board (SWEB) and Merseyside and North Wales Electricity Board (MANWEB).
- 21 December - Last underground shift worked at Mardy Colliery.
- date unknown - Following a referendum, the Vaynor Community Council in Merthyr Tydfil is abolished, the first time such an action has taken place.

== Arts and literature ==
- Commercial sponsorship of the National Eisteddfod of Wales exceeds £1 million for the first time ever.
- Griffith R. Williams of Llithfaen, Gwynedd, publishes his autobiography, Cofio canrif, making him the world's oldest author at 102.
- Geraint Talfan Davies becomes Controller of BBC Wales.

=== Awards ===
- National Eisteddfod of Wales (held in Rhymney Valley)
- National Eisteddfod of Wales: Chair - Myrddin ap Dafydd, "Gwythiennau"
- National Eisteddfod of Wales: Crown - Iwan Llwyd, "Gwreichion"
- National Eisteddfod of Wales: Prose Medal - withheld
- Gwobr Goffa Daniel Owen - Geraint V. Jones, Yn y Gwaed

=== New books ===
- John Barnie - The King of Ashes
- Carol-Ann Courtney - Morphine and Dolly Mixtures
- Rees Davies - Conquest and Domination
- Christine Evans - Cometary Phases
- David Jones - Rebecca's Children
- David H. Williams (Welsh Historian) - Atlas of Cistercian Lands in Wales
- Raymond Williams - People of the Black Mountains, vol. 2: The Eggs of the Eagle

==== Welsh language ====
- Sioned Davies - Pedair Keinc y Mabinogi
- Hywel Teifi Edwards - Codi'r Hen Wlad yn ei Hôl
- Alun Jones - Plentyn y Bwtias
- Dic Jones - Os Hoffech Wybod
- R. Gerallt Jones - Cerddi 1955-1989
- Gwyneth Lewis - Sonedau Redsa A Cherddi Eraill
- Selyf Roberts - Gorwel Agos

=== Music ===
- Bob Delyn a'r Ebillion - Sgwarnogod Bach Bob
- Datblygu - Pyst
- Dave Edmunds - Closer to the Flame
- Hanner Pei - Locsyn
- Siân James - Cysgodion Karma
- Jeffrey Lewis - Westminster Mass
- Manic Street Preachers - "New Art Riot"
- World Party - Goodbye Jumbo

== Film ==
- Catherine Zeta-Jones plays her first major film role in 1001 Nights

=== Welsh-language films ===
- Chwedl Nadolig
- Nel
- O.M.

== Broadcasting ==
=== Welsh-language television ===
- The Broadcasting Act 1990 redefines the responsibilities of S4C.
- Programmes:
  - Tydi Bywyd yn Boen

=== English-language television ===
- Hughezovka (documentary about John Hughes, founder of Donetsk)

== Sport ==
- BBC Wales Sports Personality of the Year – Ian Woosnam
- Football – Hereford United win the Welsh Cup, but Wrexham, as the top Welsh club, take their place in European competition.
- Horse racing – Norton's Coin, trained by Sirrel Griffiths at Nantgaredig, wins the Cheltenham Gold Cup at record odds of 100-1.

== Births ==
- 10 March - Luke Rowe, cyclist
- 14 March – Joe Allen, footballer
- 1 April – Joe Partington, footballer
- 17 April – Jonathan Brown, footballer
- 19 August – Laura Deas, skeleton racer
- 17 September – Jazmin Carlin, swimmer
- 16 October - Natalie Powell, judoka
- 23 October - Sian Williams, rugby player
- 14 November – Casey Thomas, footballer
- 22 November - Steffan Jones, rugby player
- 26 December – Aaron Ramsey, footballer

== Deaths ==
- 4 January – Alwyn Sheppard Fidler, architect, 80
- 20 January – Trevor Every, cricketer, 80
- 2 February – Joe Erskine, boxer, 56
- 12 March – Alf Sherwood, footballer, 66
- 13 March – Llewellyn Heycock, Baron Heycock, politician, 84
- 25 March – David Evans, cricketer and umpire, 56
- 2 April – Peter Jones, radio commentator, 60
- 4 May – John Ormond, poet and film-maker, 67
- 9 June – Angus McBean, photographer, 86
- 10 June – John Evans, world's oldest man at the time, 112
- 17 June – Menna Gallie, writer
- 24 June – Sean Hughes, politician of Welsh parentage, 44 (cancer)
- 7 July – Idwal Davies, rugby player, 74
- 6 September – Jack Howells, film-maker, 77
- 29 October – Emrys Roberts, politician, 80
- 1 November – Jack Petersen, former British heavyweight boxing champion, 79
- 8 November – Ned Jenkins, Wales international rugby player, 86
- 13 November – Richard Lewis, operatic tenor, 76
- 23 November – Roald Dahl, Cardiff-born children's writer, 74
- 27 November – Cliff Jones, Wales international rugby captain, 76
- 5 December – Eric Whitman, cricketer, 81
- 23 December – Gwilym Williams, former Archbishop of Wales, 77
- 24 December
  - Don Dearson, footballer, 76
  - David Gwyn Williams, poet, novelist, translator and academic, 86
- date unknown – Cliff Birch, footballer

== See also ==
- 1990 in Northern Ireland
