= 1987 in Scottish television =

This is a list of events in Scottish television from 1987.

== Events ==
=== March ===
- 3 March –
  - Debut of the BBC Scotland drama Tutti Frutti.
  - Take the High Road returns from its annual break, and from this date, the soap begins to be shown twice a week all year round.

=== June ===
- 11 – 12 June – Coverage of the results of the 1987 general election is broadcast both on BBC1 and ITV.
- 29 June – Schools programmes are broadcast on ITV for the last time.

=== August ===
- 31 August – The 30th anniversary of Scottish Television.

=== September ===
- 7 September – ITV launches a full morning programme schedule, with advertising, for the first time. The new service includes regular five-minute national and Scottish news bulletins.
- 14 September – After 30 years on ITV, ITV Schools moves to Channel 4. Opt outs of the network schools schedule continue, thereby allowing programmes relevant to schools in Scotland to continue to be broadcast. To date, this is the only time that Scotland has opted out of the Channel 4 schedule.
- 10 December – Grampian Television and Camanachd Association agree a three year contract for shinty coverage, taking over from Scottish Television.

== Debuts ==
=== BBC ===
- 3 March – Tutti Frutti (1987)

== Television series ==
- Scotsport (1957–2008)
- Reporting Scotland (1968–1983; 1984–present)
- Top Club (1971–1998)
- Scotland Today (1972–2009)
- Sportscene (1975–present)
- The Beechgrove Garden (1978–present)
- Grampian Today (1980–2009)
- Take the High Road (1980–2003)
- Taggart (1983–2010)
- James the Cat (1984–1992)
- Crossfire on Grampian (1984–2004)
- City Lights (1984–1991)
- The Campbells (1986–1990)
- Naked Video (1986–1991)

== Ending this year ==
- 7 April – Tutti Frutti (1987)

== Births ==
- 8 August – Katie Leung, actress

== Deaths ==
- 4 February – Fyfe Robertson, 84, television journalist
- 6 June – Fulton Mackay, actor (Porridge)
- Unknown – Finlay J. MacDonald, 61, radio and television presenter

== See also ==
- 1987 in Scotland
