= Sarah O'Flaherty =

Irish broadcaster

Sarah o flaherty
- Born: 30 June 1973 (age 52); Dublin, Ireland
- Occupations: Television and radio presenter
- Known for: Presenting The Grip

Sarah O'Flaherty (born 1973), known as Sarah O', is an Irish television presenter who has worked on Irish, English and Scottish television shows. She began her career as co-presenter of The Grip (Ryle Nugent also presented this).

== Early life ==
O'Flaherty grew up in Dublin, Ireland with her parents and three brothers. She was a member of the Girl Guides, during which time she learned "good team player, listen to and help others" and put her in good stead for the workplace.

== Career ==
O'Flaherty began her career as a co-presenter of RTÉ's The Grip enabling her to travel the world covering sporting events and allowing her participate in many extreme sports such as skydiving and bungee jumping. This was followed by a stint in London as the host of TV3 Ireland's Irish Pepsi Chart Show which gave viewers the opportunity to travel to Sydney, Australia for the 2000 Summer Olympics.

=== Scotsport ===
O'Flaherty was signed to co-present Scottish Television's (STV) football show Scotsport, along with Jim Delahunt and Julyan Sinclair. The aim was to try to entice new and younger viewers to the flagship sport show but viewers tuned out and the presenters were criticised for their apparent lack of football knowledge. Over 2,000 fans signed an online petition calling for O'Flaherty and Sinclair's dismissal; however with a view base of over 250,000 this was a very small proportion. After two years the pairs' contract was not renewed in 2006.

=== On the Radio and in the Paper ===
From 2003 to 2007, O'Flaherty worked for Radio Clyde as their news, show business and sports reporter as well as DJing on Saturday nights with her own music show called the Mix Monkey. She also wrote a weekly "Diary" column for the Evening Times.
