= 1988 in Scottish television =

This is a list of events in Scottish television from 1988.

== Events ==
=== January ===
- 19 January – Debut of the BBC Scotland television film Down Where the Buffalo Go.

=== February ===
- 13 February – Scottish Television (STV) begins 24-hour broadcasting.

=== July ===
- 19 July – Debut on ITV of the STV produced game show Wheel of Fortune.

=== September ===
- 2 September – Grampian and Border begin 24-hour transmission. Their overnight programming comes from Granada Television's Night Time service.

== Autumn ==
- The BBC takes its first tentative steps into later closedowns – previously weekday programmes ended no later than 12:15 am and weekend broadcasting had finished by 1:30 am.

=== December ===
- 31 December – Transmission of Tony Roper's The Steamie, about life in a Glasgow wash-house during the 1950s, starring Dorothy Paul and Eileen McCallum.

== Debuts ==
=== ITV ===
- 19 July – Wheel of Fortune (1988–2001)

== Television series ==
- Scotsport (1957–2008)
- Reporting Scotland (1968–1983; 1984–present)
- Top Club (1971–1998)
- Scotland Today (1972–2009)
- Sportscene (1975–present)
- The Beechgrove Garden (1978–present)
- Grampian Today (1980–2009)
- Take the High Road (1980–2003)
- Taggart (1983–2010)
- James the Cat (1984–1992)
- Crossfire on Grampian (1984–2004)
- City Lights (1984–1991)
- The Campbells (1986–1990)
- Naked Video (1986–1991)

== Births ==
- 27 January – Iain Stirling, comedian

== See also ==
- 1988 in Scotland
