= 1990 in Scotland =

- Centuries: 18th; 19th; 20th; 21st
- Decades: 1970s; 1980s; 1990s; 2000s; 2010s
- See also: List of years in Scotland; Timeline of Scottish history 1990 in: The UK • England • Wales • Elsewhere; Scottish football: 1989–90 • 1990–91; 1990 in Scottish television

Events from the year 1990 in Scotland.

== Incumbents ==
- Secretary of State for Scotland and Keeper of the Great Seal – Malcolm Rifkind until 28 November; then Ian Lang

=== Law officers ===
- Lord Advocate – Lord Fraser of Carmyllie
- Solicitor General for Scotland – Alan Rodger

=== Judiciary ===
- Lord President of the Court of Session and Lord Justice General – Lord Hope
- Lord Justice Clerk – Lord Ross
- Chairman of the Scottish Land Court – Lord Elliott

== Events ==
- 17 March – Rugby union: Scotland beat England 13–7 at Murrayfield to win the Calcutta Cup. The win also clinches the 1990 Five Nations Championship, Grand Slam and Triple Crown for Scotland.
- 24 April – Gruinard Island declared to be decontaminated of anthrax.
- 29 April – Stephen Hendry, 21, wins the 1990 World Snooker Championship and becomes the youngest ever world snooker champion.
- 3 May – 1990 Scottish regional elections held.
- 12 May – Aberdeen beat Celtic 9–8 on penalties to win the Scottish Cup.
- 13 July – The Term and Quarter Days (Scotland) Act 1990 receives Royal Assent.
- August – Privatisation of the Scottish Bus Group begins with sale of Lowland Scottish in a management-employee buy-out.
- 22 September – Alex Salmond wins the Scottish National Party leadership election, succeeding Gordon Wilson
- 27 September – The first episode of the sitcom Rab C. Nesbitt starring Gregor Fisher in the title role, is broadcast on BBC Two. The programme would run until 1999.
- 29 November – Labour win by-elections in Paisley South and Paisley North, retaining both seats despite swings to the SNP of 11.7% and 14% respectively.

== Arts and literature ==
- 22 August – James MacMillan's symphonic piece The Confession of Isobel Gowdie premieres at The Proms in London.
- 13 September – Iain M. Banks' science fiction novel Use of Weapons is published.
- 5 October – Glasgow Royal Concert Hall opens in Sauchiehall Street.
- 11 October–15 November – BBC Scotland broadcasts the television comedy-drama series Your Cheatin' Heart written by John Byrne and starring Tilda Swinton and John Gordon Sinclair.
- Soft rock band Travis forms in Glasgow.

== Births ==
- 24 March – Libby Clegg, athlete
- 10 April – Stacey McDougall, lawn bowler
- 22 April – Eve Muirhead, curler
- 29 June – Kim Little, footballer
- 2 July – Morag McLellan, field hockey player
- 11 July – Lynsey Sharp, middle-distance runner
- 13 August – Elise Christie, short-track speed skater
- 25 November – Eilish McColgan, middle-distance runner

== Deaths ==
- 6 January – Ian Charleson, actor (born 1949)
- 8 January – Jenny Gilbertson, documentary filmmaker (born 1902)
- 14 January – Gordon Jackson, actor (born 1923)
- 12 August – Roy Williamson, folk musician (born 1936)
- 4 November – David Stirling, army officer, founder of the Special Air Service (born 1915)
- Stephens Orr, society photographer

== See also ==
- 1990 in Northern Ireland
- 1990 in Wales
