= Julyan Sinclair =

Scottish television producer and presenter

Julyan Sinclair is an Orcadian television and radio presenter. He won a BAFTA in 2002 for "Best New Television Presenter" for his work on various Scottish Television arts and entertainment programmes.

== Television career ==
He has previously hosted Scotsport, along with Jim Delahunt and Sarah O, on STV. Both Sinclair and Sarah O'Flaherty left the programme in 2006, with Jim Delahunt leaving shortly after. For the past 15 years Sinclair has focussed on behind the camera work, and has been nominated for Scottish BAFTAs for his directing, series producing, and camerawork, and is Series Producer on the Channel 4 show Location, Location, Location.

Julyan has appeared as a guest presenter on STV's daily lifestyle show The Hour on a few occasions, alongside main anchor Michelle McManus since November 2009.

== Radio ==
Sinclair was an overseas correspondent for US and Australian radio stations, having spent a year in the US working for a radio station, and being employed at Triple J (the Australian version of the UK's Radio 1) during his time down under.

Sinclair hosted the XFM Scotland breakfast show until 7 November 2008 when XFM Scotland was renamed Galaxy Scotland.

== Writing ==
Sinclair also writes for tabloids and broadsheets.
