= Bunkered =

Scottish golf magazine

bunkered
- Frequency: 10 issues per year
- Founded: 1995
- First issue: April 1996
- Company: DC Thomson
- Country: Scotland
- Based in: Glasgow
- Language: English
- Website: www.bunkered.co.uk
- ISSN: 1363-6561

bunkered is a golf magazine from Scotland published by DC Thomson. Based in Glasgow, Scotland, the magazine was launched in 1996 and is published ten times per year.

The magazine covers all aspects of golf, from equipment to tuition, travel, interviews and more.

== History ==
After two pilot editions of the magazine were released in 1995, the first official edition of bunkered was launched in April 1996 by Pro Sports Promotions, an independent publishing company based in Glasgow. The company later rebranded to PSP Publishing and then to PSP Media. Initially, bunkered produced four issues in its first year.

By 1998, production increased to five editions annually, followed by six editions in 1999. Starting in 2002, the magazine transitioned to an eight-issue-per-year schedule. It marked the publication of its 100th edition in 2010 during the Open Championship held in St Andrews.

In 1999, bunkered became the highest-selling golf magazine in Scotland, according to industry reports.

In 2018, ownership of the magazine transferred to DC Thomson. In 2023, the magazine expanded its distribution to include ten issues per year and was sold in England, Wales, and Ireland for the first time, having previously been available only in Scotland.

bunkered has featured interviews with golf figures, including Jack Nicklaus, Arnold Palmer, Tom Watson, Gary Player, Seve Ballesteros, Colin Montgomerie, and Donald Trump.

Additionally, bunkered organized the bunkered Matchplay Challenge in 2004 and 2007, a Ryder Cup-style event that pitted teams from the Scottish amateur and professional golf circuits against each other.

== The bunkered Podcast ==
In August 2020, The bunkered Podcast was launched. The weekly show has featured guest appearances from personalities including Gary Player, Paige Spiranac, Colin Montgomerie, Rich Beem, Annika Sorenstam, Greg Norman, Jose Maria Olazabal and Ian Woosnam.

Non-golfers to have appeared on the show include Academy Award nominee Michael O'Keefe, tennis star Jamie Murray and former Manchester United and England footballer Teddy Sheringham.

In 2021, the show won the Best Sports Podcast Award at the Publisher Podcast Awards. It successfully defended the title at the same awards the following year.

In September 2023, The bunkered Podcast staged its first ever live, in-person, ticketed event at Drygate Brewery in Glasgow.

Since April 2022, the show has been sponsored by golf equipment firm Callaway.

== Green Fee Savers ==
In 1999, bunkered launched Green Fee Savers, a discount golf program that enabled recreational golfers to enjoy half-price rounds at hundreds of clubs across the UK and Ireland. The program was discontinued in 2010.

== Notable columnists ==
- Arthur Montford - 1996–2014
- Paul Lawrie - 2001–2005
- Colin Montgomerie - 2008–2010
- Bernard Gallacher - 1998–2008
- Dougie Donnelly - 2016–2018

== Awards ==
bunkered and its personnel have won a number of PPA Awards.

- Columnist of the Year: Michael McEwan, 2023
- Writer of the Year: Michael McEwan, 2023
- Scottish Publisher of the Year: 2011
- Consumer Magazine Editor of the Year: Bryce Ritchie, 2010
- Consumer Magazine Editor of the Year: 2008
- Scottish Brand Development of the Year: 2009
- Scottish Publisher of the Year: 2006
- Scottish Consumer Magazine of the Year: 2004, 2023
