= 1989 in Scotland =

- Centuries: 18th; 19th; 20th; 21st
- Decades: 1960s; 1970s; 1980s; 1990s; 2000s
- See also: List of years in Scotland; Timeline of Scottish history 1989 in: The UK • England • Wales • Elsewhere; Scottish football: 1988–89 • 1989–90; 1989 in Scottish television

Events from the year 1989 in Scotland.

== Incumbents ==
- Secretary of State for Scotland and Keeper of the Great Seal – Malcolm Rifkind

=== Law officers ===
- Lord Advocate – Lord Cameron of Lochbroom; then Peter Fraser, Baron Fraser of Carmyllie
- Solicitor General for Scotland – Peter Fraser; then Alan Rodger

=== Judiciary ===
- Lord President of the Court of Session and Lord Justice General – Lord Emslie until 27 September; then Lord Hope
- Lord Justice Clerk – Lord Ross
- Chairman of the Scottish Land Court – Lord Elliott

== Events ==
- 4 January – a memorial service is held for the 270 people who died in the Lockerbie air disaster, including 11 from Lockerbie itself, two weeks ago.
- 18 January – Aberdeen area bus operator Grampian Regional Transport s sold by Grampian Regional Council in an employee stock ownership plan to GRT Group led by general manager Moir Lockhead in the first sale of a non-PTE municipal operator following bus deregulation in the United Kingdom. GRT goes on to become a foundation of the national transport operator FirstGroup.
- 7 February – Ness Viaduct at Inverness is washed away by floods, isolating the rail system to the far north for more than two years.
- 13 February - Fraserburgh In Aberdeenshire Records Scotland's Highest Low-Level Wind Speed At 142 mph
- 6 March – Glasgow Bellgrove rail accident: Two killed in a head-on collision.
- 30 March – the Claim of Right is signed at the General Assembly Hall, on the Mound in Edinburgh, by 58 of Scotland's 72 Members of Parliament.
- May – St. Enoch Centre shopping mall opened to the public in Glasgow city centre.
- 15 June – Glasgow Central by-election: Labour retain the seat despite a 15.1% swing to the Scottish National Party.
- 10 July – Mo Johnston becomes the first Roman Catholic player to sign for Rangers F.C., the Scottish league champions, when he completes a £1.5million move from FC Nantes in France. To add controversy to the move, Johnston was a player for their city rivals Celtic from 1984 to 1987.
- 15 November – Scotland achieves qualification for the FIFA World Cup.
- Red kites reintroduced to the north of Scotland.

== Births ==
- 1 January – Alan Martin, footballer
- 16 January – Paul Sweeney, politician
- 10 April – Glen Muirhead, curler
- 8 August – Hannah Miley, swimmer
- 17 August – Rachel Corsie, footballer
- 28 August – Jamie Murphy, footballer

== Deaths ==
- 23 March – Bob McTaggart, Labour MP 1980–1989 (born 1945)
- 14 September – Alexander Scott, poet and literary scholar (born 1920)
- 26 November – Lavinia Derwent (real name Elizabeth Dodd), children's author and broadcaster (born 1909)

== The arts ==
- James Kelman's Glasgow patter stream of consciousness novel A Disaffection is published.

== See also ==
- 1989 in Northern Ireland
