= Tush push =

Play in American football

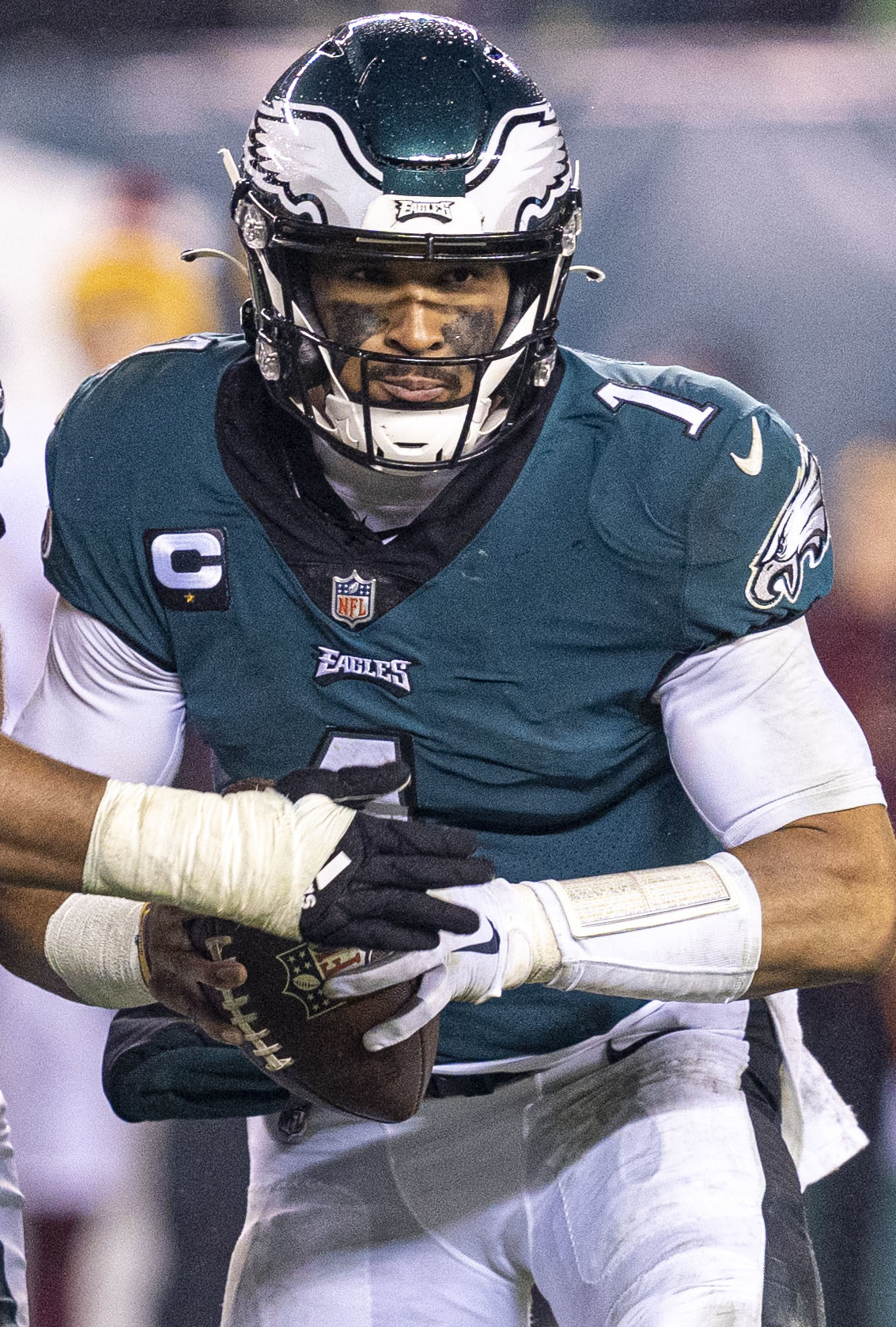
Philadelphia Eagles quarterback Jalen Hurts has been involved in the team's tush push play since 2021.

The tush push, sometimes called the brotherly shove, is an American football play popularized by the Philadelphia Eagles. It is a variation of the traditional quarterback sneak, in which the quarterback takes the snap and immediately drives forward while the offensive line is also surging forward. In the Eagles' version, additional players line up behind the quarterback and physically push him forward as the offensive line surges ahead. It is typically used in short-yardage situations, most commonly within one to two yards of the goal line or first down marker.

The Eagles first attempted the tush push in 2021 with Jalen Hurts as their quarterback. Since 2022, the Eagles have regularly executed the tush push with notable efficiency, making it a key part of their offensive strategy and contributing to their appearances in Super Bowl LVII and Super Bowl LIX, the latter of which they won. Other teams in the NFL such as the Buffalo Bills and in college football have tried to replicate the play with varying degrees of success. However, due to increased officiating scrutiny and defensive adjustments, the play was noted to decline in effectiveness by 2025.

The tush push has drawn controversy, with fans, players, coaches, team executives and media pundits calling for it to be banned from the NFL. Critics argue that it causes difficulty for referees to officiate, poses safety risks, and gives the offense an unfair advantage while decreasing the sport's watchability due to its high success rate. It has also been compared to the flying wedge, a similar play banned for over a century due to causing numerous injuries and fatalities. Supporters contend that it is legal, available to all teams, and should not be banned simply due to the Eagles' effectiveness running it. The play is currently banned in high school football.

== Background ==
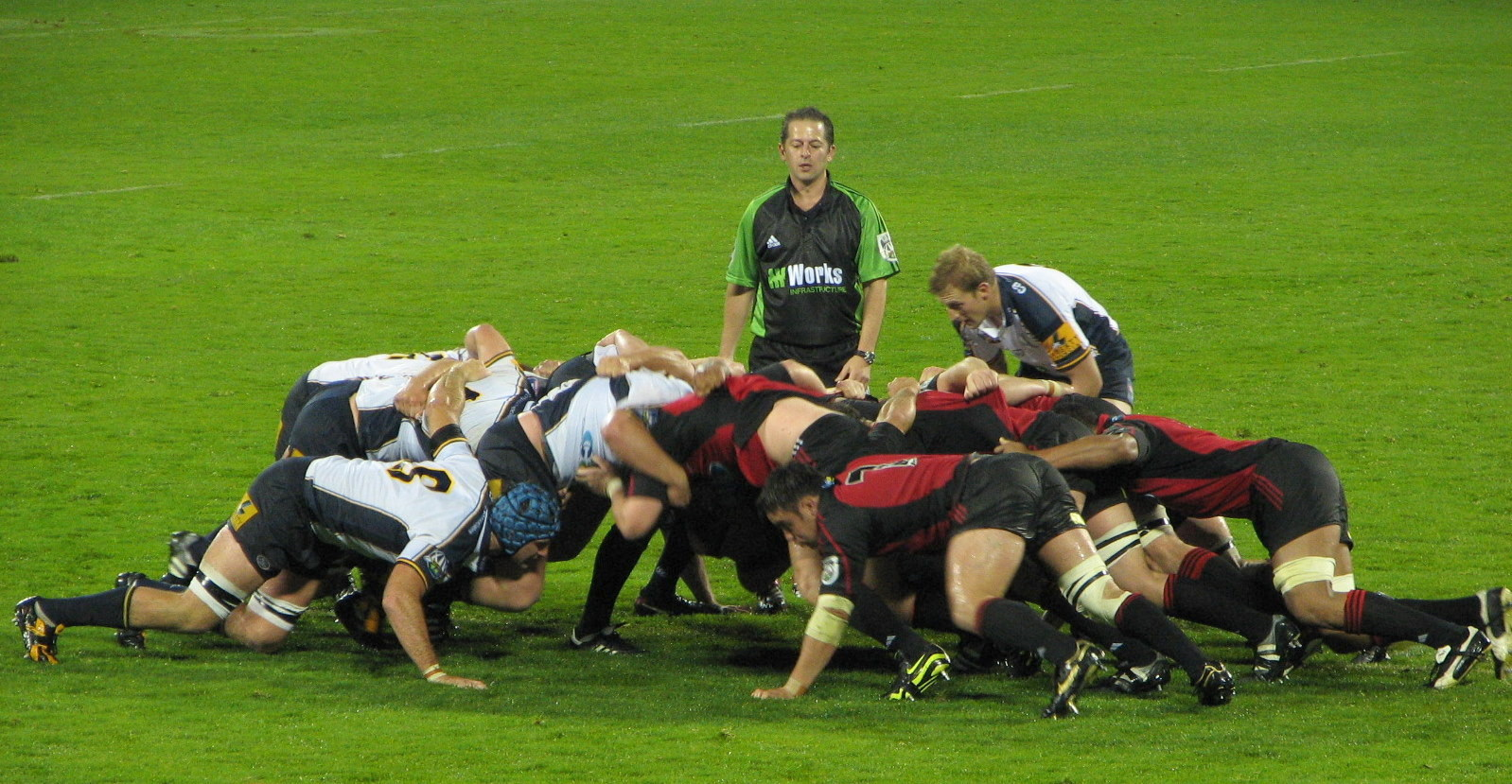
The appearance and design of the tush push has drawn comparisons to a scrum, a play often seen in Rugby union.

The tush push is a variation of the quarterback sneak, which is a basic play in American football where the quarterback lines up directly behind the center, takes the snap, and immediately dives or pushes forward behind the offensive line, who simultaneously move forward. The play is designed to gain a short distance, usually to convert a 3rd or 4th down and inches, or to score near the goal line. In the case of the tush push, a player, usually the quarterback, is pushed from behind by one or two of his own teammates as he and the offensive line simultaneously drive forward after being lined up in tight formation. This pushing motion and the resulting formation has often been compared to several different rugby union forms of gameplay, such as the ruck, scrum, driving maul, and pick-and-go.

=== Origins ===
The play's origins trace back decades to the innovative coaching of Bill Snyder at Kansas State University. Starting around 2005, Snyder began experimenting with assisted quarterback sneaks, recognizing the potential for maximizing short-yardage efficiency. His approach was characteristically methodical–identifying a strategic advantage and refining it through systematic implementation. From 2015 to 2018, Snyder's offensive coordinator Dana Dimel played a crucial role in implementing and developing the early version of the play. The play and its nickname can also be traced to the Bush push, where University of Southern California quarterback Matt Leinart scored a last-second touchdown against the University of Notre Dame in 2005 thanks to a shove from teammate Reggie Bush; the NFL removed the prohibition on pushing ball-carriers the next year.

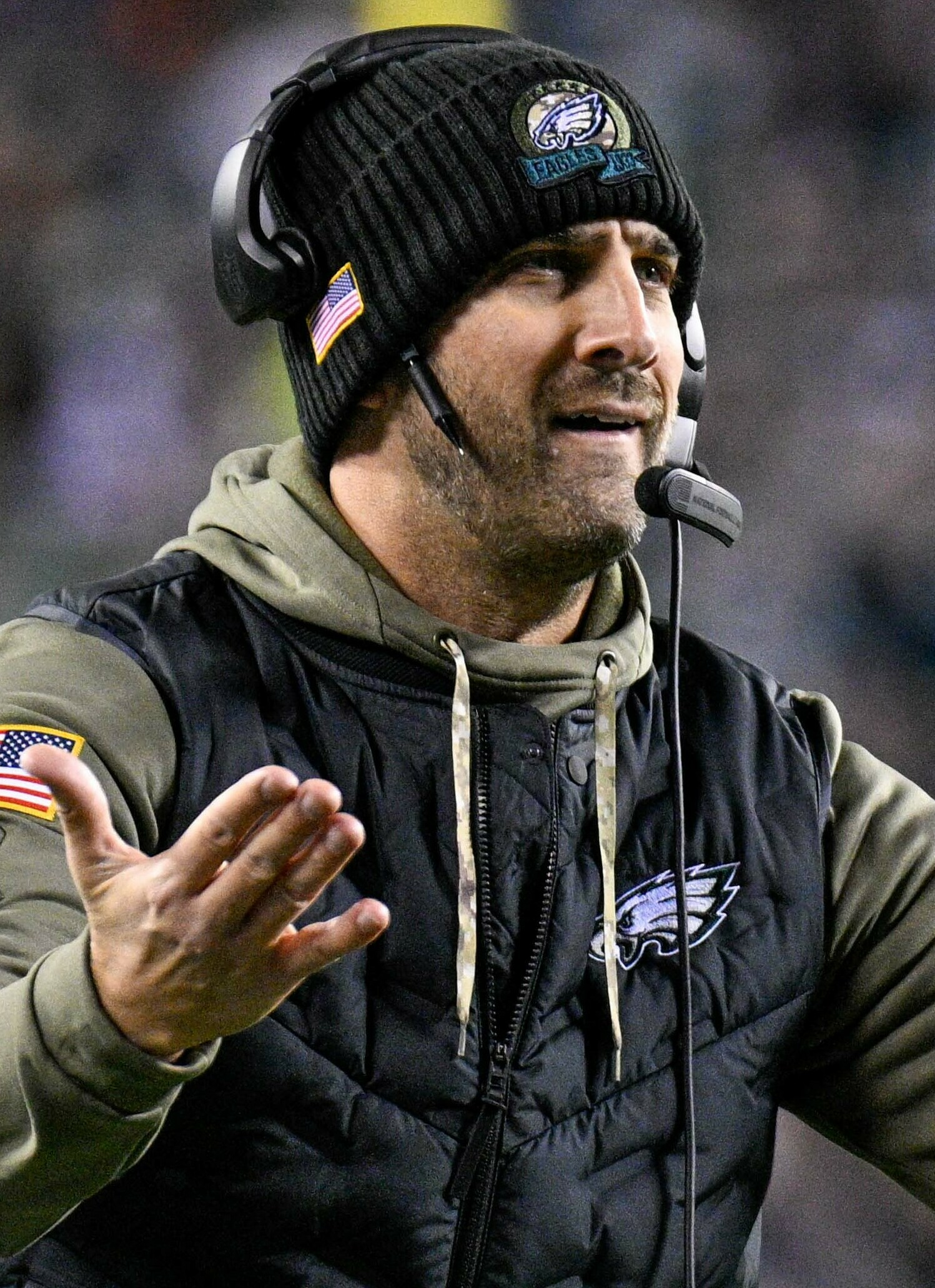
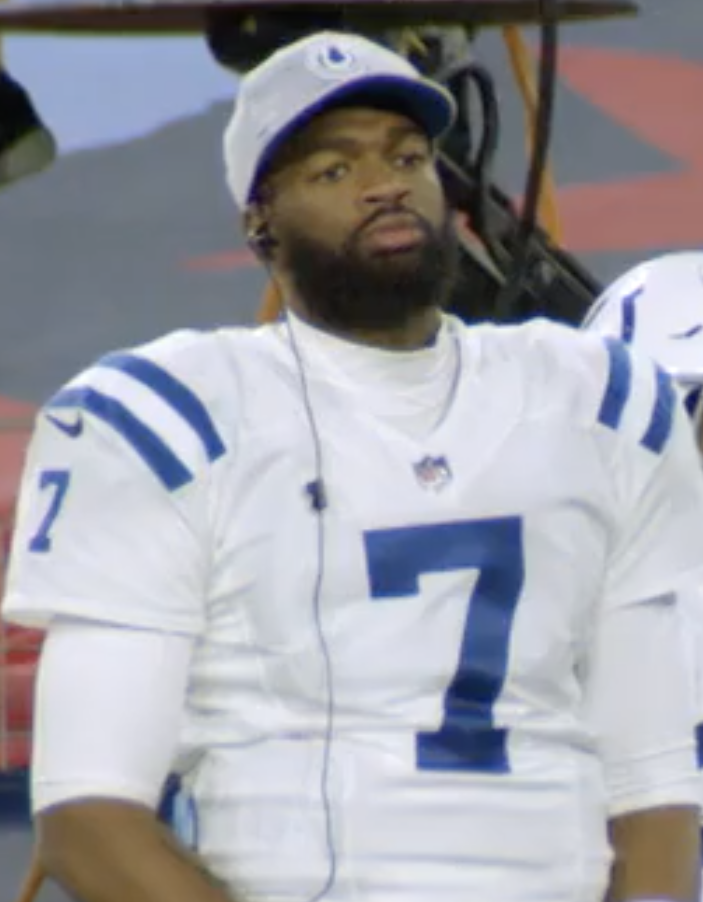
Offensive coordinator Nick Sirianni (left) and quarterback Jacoby Brissett (right) ran an early version of the play while part of the Indianapolis Colts in 2020. Sirianni brought the play's concept with him when he became head coach of the Philadelphia Eagles.

In 2018, Minnesota Vikings linebacker Anthony Barr was overheard theorizing an early version of the play, suggesting a large quarterback should be pushed from behind by one or two other large teammates during short-yardage situations. The Indianapolis Colts ran a variation of the play during Week 10 of the 2020 season against the Tennessee Titans, when backup quarterback Jacoby Brissett, who weighed 238 pounds (108 kg), was put in the game and ran in for a touchdown at the 1-yard line. Nick Sirianni, their offensive coordinator at the time, would join the Philadelphia Eagles as head coach the next year. He later credited Brissett and Colts head coach Frank Reich for inspiring the play, along with his future Eagles offensive line coach Jeff Stoutland and their former quarterback Carson Wentz.

=== Implementation by the Philadelphia Eagles ===
Sirianni introduced the play's concept to the Eagles upon joining the team in 2021. The team ran its first iteration in Week 5 against the Carolina Panthers, when Eagles fullback Jack Stoll pushed quarterback Jalen Hurts from behind to get him over the goal line. The team ran it again in Week 11, in a home game against the New Orleans Saints, this time with tight end Dallas Goedert motioning across the formation before settling in directly behind Hurts. When the ball was snapped, Goedert pushed Hurts to help get the yard needed to successfully convert for a first down.

The Eagles continued to incorporate the play during the 2022 season, trying out different variations in short-yardage situations. Then-Eagles offensive coordinator Shane Steichen later cited their Week 5 matchup against the Arizona Cardinals as a turning point. Initially, it was merely one of the Eagles' many short-yardage plays, but after successfully using it to make five out of six first-down conversions against the Cardinals, the team decided to make it their singular focus in those situations. During the next week's game against the Dallas Cowboys, the team additionally lined up a running back behind Hurts, resulting in the now-familiar formation of two players on each of the quarterback's hips. Following the season's end, Stoutland recruited Scottish rugby coach Richie Gray into the Eagles organization to refine the play's technique.

=== League-wide usage ===
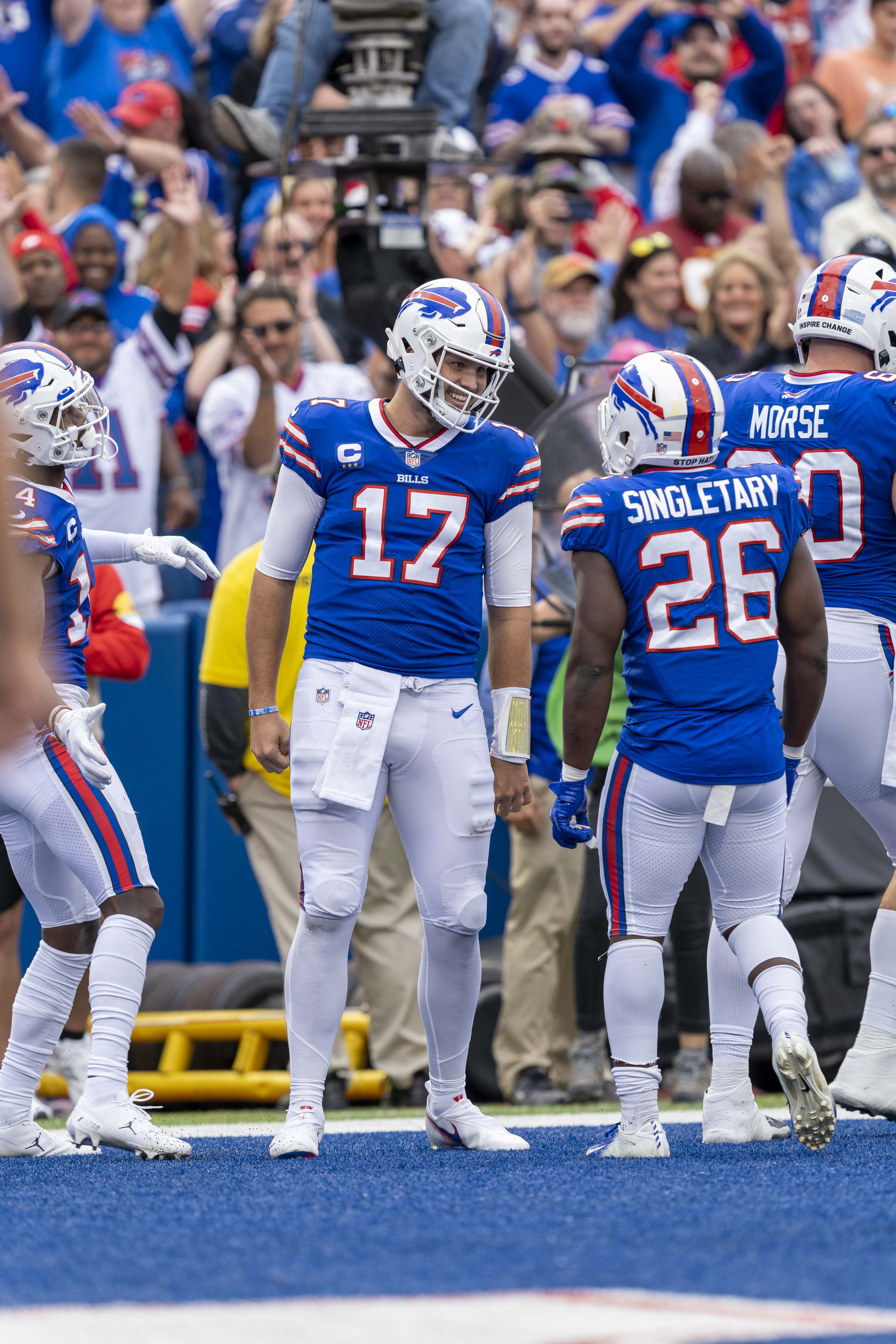
Josh Allen and the Buffalo Bills were one of the few NFL teams to successfully incorporate the tush push into their own offense.

The controversial play became widely known as the "tush push", as well as the "Brotherly Shove", which is a play on the "City of Brotherly Love" nickname for Philadelphia. The league quickly began to take notice of the play's effectiveness, and several teams would attempt to emulate the tush push with their own personnel, notably the Buffalo Bills with their 6'5" quarterback Josh Allen. By the end of the 2022 NFL season, the Eagles had run the play 39 times, the Bills 26 and the rest of league a combined 36 times. The Bills would later notably use the play in the 2025 AFC Wild Card Game to push Allen for 10 yards on a 4th-and-1 on the Jacksonville Jaguars' 11 yard line to convert a first down, and then again on the next play to score the game-winning touchdown.

The Seattle Seahawks would also implement the tush push during the 2025 season using their 6′6″ tight end AJ Barner to snap the ball; Seahawks fans would call their variation of the play the "Barnyard".

== Design and execution ==
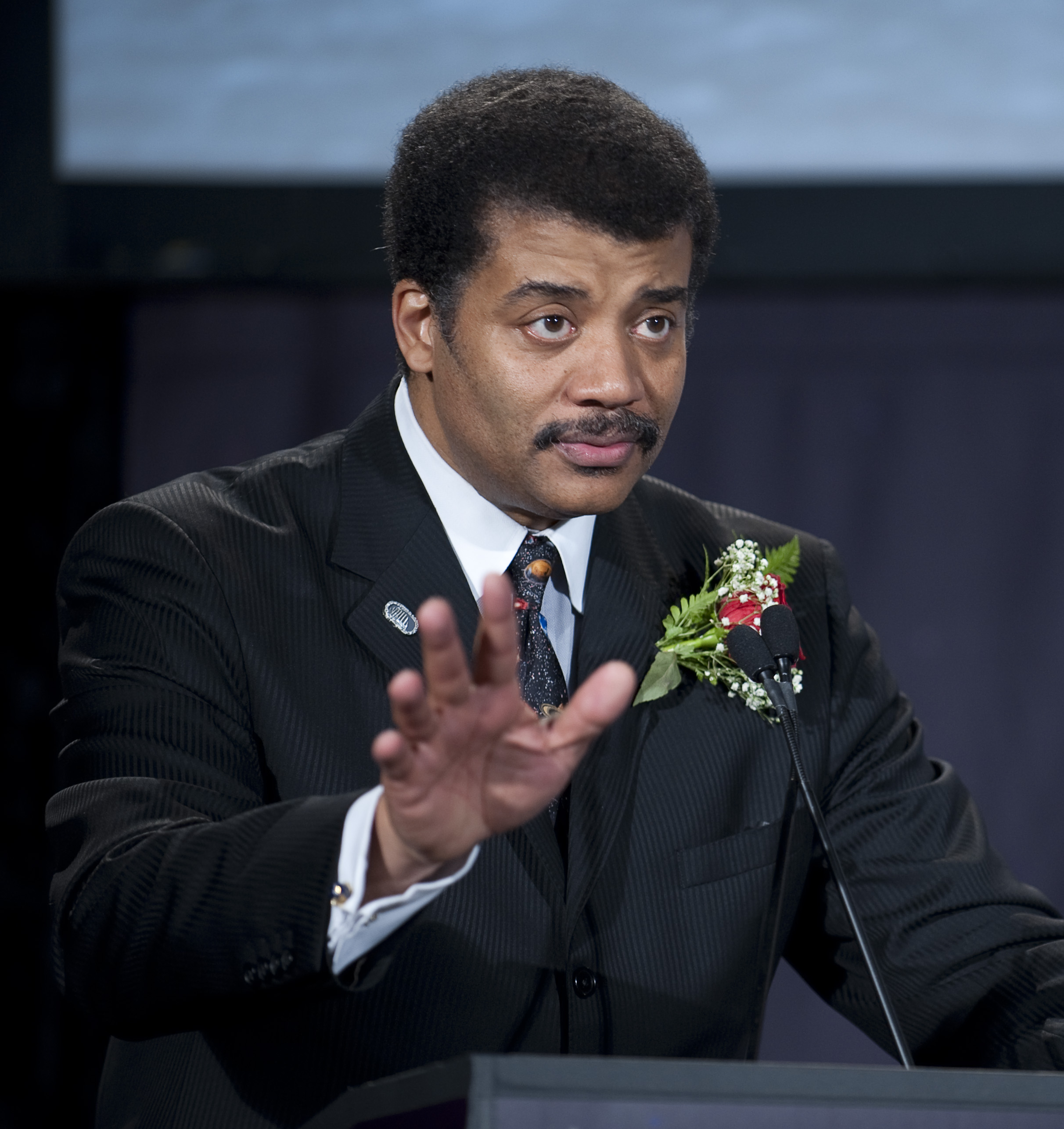
Astrophysicist Neil deGrasse Tyson cited the Eagles's large offensive line having initial movement and using the ground to launch themselves forward as the keys to the tush push's success.

Part of the Eagles' success in running the tush push has been attributed to the team's roster and personnel. When the team ran the play during the 2024 season, quarterback Jalen Hurts, a former powerlifter who could squat 600 pounds (272 kg), was designed to run behind the combined 697 pounds (316 kg) of left tackle Jordan Mailata and left guard Landon Dickerson, along with center Cam Jurgens, who weighed 303 pounds (137 kg). Pushing Hurts from behind that year was running back Saquon Barkley, who could lift 600 pounds (272 kg), and tight end Dallas Goedert, who Barkley commended for his strength. Hurts' unique lower-body strength and instincts for finding openings in the line of scrimmage have been cited as some of the key components for making the play work, and why other teams have failed to replicate it. Another important aspect noted for the play's success is the ability of the interior offensive linemen to create significant push and get lower than the defensive linemen. Former longtime Eagles center Jason Kelce, who preceded Jurgens and participated in the tush push during its inception, was noted to have this skillset.

Scientifically breaking down the tush push, astrophysicist Neil deGrasse Tyson primarily credited the size and strength of the Eagles' offensive line for the play's success. The 2024 Eagles featured one of the largest offensive lines in the league, including right tackle Lane Johnson, standing at 6 feet 6 inches (1.98 m), and weighing 325 pounds (147 kg); left tackle Mailata, who measures at 6 feet 8 inches (2.03 m) and 365 pounds (166 kg); and left guard Dickerson, who is 6 feet 6 inches (1.98 m) and 335 pounds (152 kg). Tyson further detailed that when running the play, the offensive line would "[use] the Earth as a launching point for their movement" to propel themselves forward, and that the offense snapping the ball first also gives the advantage of a "quarter-second head start in momentum transfer" over the defense. With the offensive line driving low, this clears the path for Hurts to charge forward. Tyson also mentioned that defenders who try to leap over the offensive line to halt momentum are at a disadvantage, as they are airborne and unable to use the ground to add to their momentum.

=== Play variations ===
After successfully incorporating the play into their offensive playbook, the Eagles began implementing new variations to further confuse the defense. During the 2024 NFC Championship Game the Eagles incorporated a hard count into the play, resulting in the opposing Washington Commanders drawing three consecutive encroachment penalties. Commanders linebacker Frankie Luvu received a disqualification warning after getting called for the first two penalties during this sequence, and after the Commanders were penalized for the third time, the referee warned that a touchdown would be automatically awarded to the Eagles if it happened again.

In a 2025 Week 4 match against the Tampa Bay Buccaneers, the Eagles ran two variations when lining up in the tush push formation. The first occurred on first-and-goal when Hurts threw the ball underhand to Goedert, who followed a set of blockers into the end zone, and the second occurred during a third-and-1 near their opponent's goal line, when Hurts broke the formation to hand the ball off to Barkley, who ran a jet sweep for an easy uncontested touchdown. The Pittsburgh Steelers, who had implemented the tush push into their own offensive game plan using fullback/tight end Connor Heyward to snap and run the ball, would run a similar variation of the play later that season against the Chicago Bears when Hayward handed the ball to his running back for a 55-yard gain rather than attempting to convert the first down himself.

=== Success rate ===
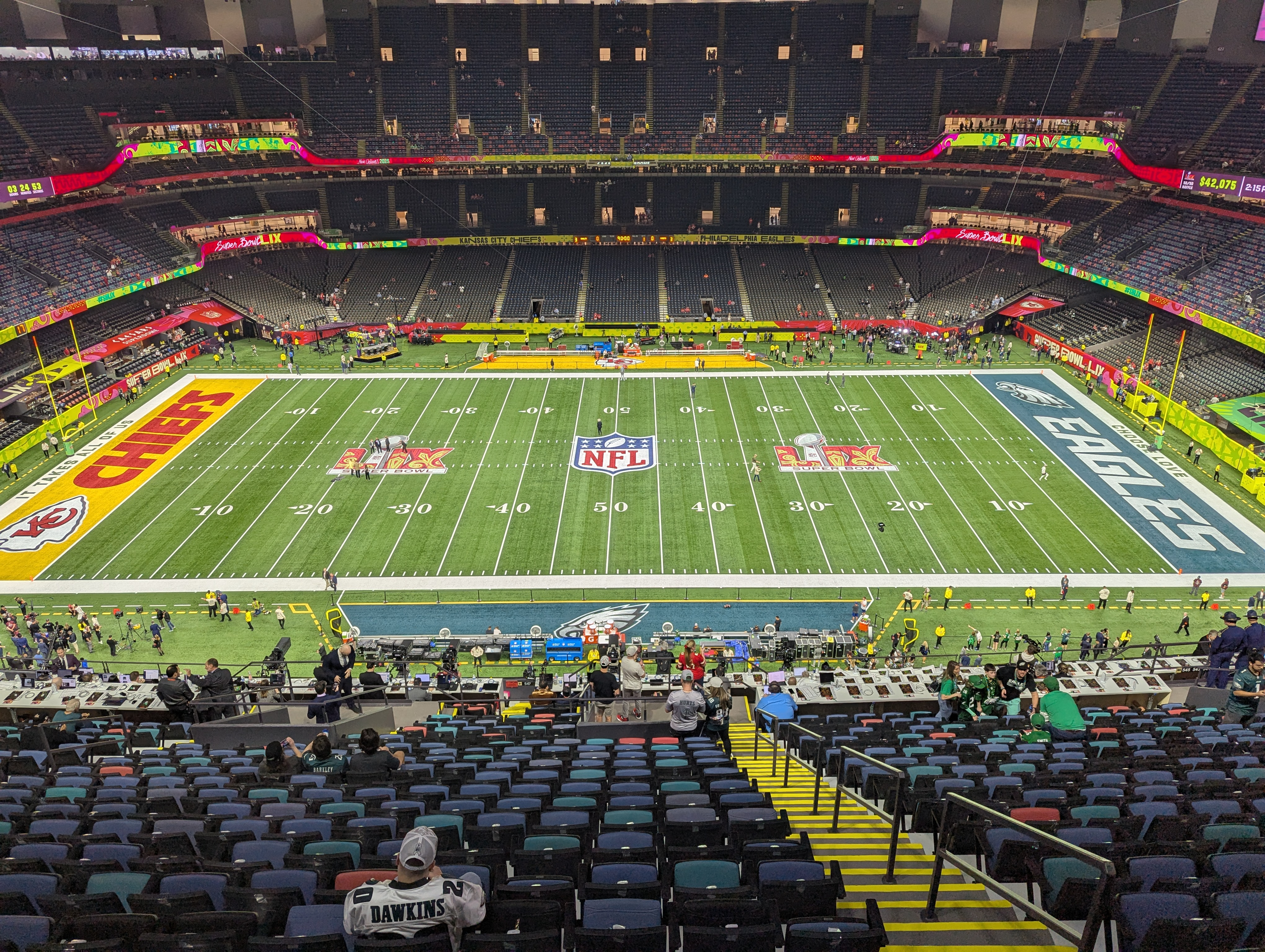
The Philadelphia Eagles used the tush push to score the first touchdown of Super Bowl LIX, which they won.

The tush push has been noted as a particularly effective play, with several pundits calling it "unstoppable" and "automatic". Having the play in his team's playbook caused Eagles head coach Nick Sirianni to liken every fresh set of downs to a "first-and-9", rather than the customary first-and-10, as he and the team felt confident in using the tush push to successfully convert a fourth-and-1 situation. During the 2022 season, the Philadelphia Eagles converted 29-of-32 attempts for a first down–a success rate of over 90%. Between 2022 and 2024, 28 of the 32 teams in the NFL attempted a variation of the play, while other college football teams have also adapted some form of the tush push. Throughout that same period, the Eagles and the Buffalo Bills executed the play 163 times. Both teams either scored a touchdown or achieved a first down 87% of the time, while the rest of the NFL has only been successful on 71% of attempts. A total of 52 NFL touchdowns were scored using the tush push during those three seasons, with the Eagles scoring 27 of them. Additionally, the Eagles reached Super Bowl LVII and Super Bowl LIX in the same timeframe and scored the first touchdown of both games using the tush push, ultimately losing the first Super Bowl but winning the second.

The play was noted to have less efficiency during the 2025 season, falling to a 61.3% success rate for the Eagles. This lowering has been attributed to increased scrutiny by the officials, as well as more adjustments from the defense. During the middle of the season, the Eagles had no gain or a fumble in four of seven attempts when running the play. The team was noted to run the tush push less towards the end of the year. In the last three regular season games with their starters, the Eagles used the play only four times; in seven plays with 1 yard to go, the team instead handed the ball off to the running back five times and passed the ball once. However, it was also noted that Philadelphia had changed their red zone philosophy throughout the season by having more throws as opposed to quarterback runs.

== Defending against the tush push ==
Lacking the right personnel has made teams unable to safely replicate the tush push during practice; former Philadelphia Eagles offensive coordinator Shane Steichen stated the team perfected the play by running it during games. Consequently, this also causes difficulty in determining ways to defend against the play. Strategies in attempting to stop the tush push include defenders trying to anticipate the snap count in order to get a head start, or jumping over the offensive line when the ball is snapped to stop the runner.

Multiple opponents have tried to neutralize the tush push by having defenders mimic Eagles quarterback Jalen Hurts' cadence before the ball is snapped in order to draw the offensive players into a false start penalty. The Los Angeles Rams successfully executed this maneuver during the 2024 NFC Divisional Round, when one of the defensive players yelled a command that could easily be mistaken for Hurts' voice. This resulted in right tackle Lane Johnson flinching on the 1-yard line and drawing a false start penalty. Left tackle Jordan Mailata would accuse the Kansas City Chiefs of trying the same tactic during their 2025 Week 2 matchup, while right guard Tyler Steen mentioned that this happens often when they attempt the play. While such an action would draw an unsportsmanlike conduct penalty by the NFL rulebook, it is not a point of emphasis for NFL officials or clubs due to the difficulty for referees to hear through the crowd noise from their positions on the field.

The Minnesota Vikings attempted a new formation to defend against the play during their 2025 Week 7 matchup against the Eagles, having one of their defenders lie down sideways in front of the ball before it was snapped. Jason Kelce called it an "interesting strategy", explaining that the Vikings were attempting a "log jam" at the point as the defensive tackles jumped over the player on the ground. He also stated that this attempt against the tush push nearly worked.

When the Chicago Bears played the Eagles in Week 13 of the 2025 season, cornerback Nahshon Wright waited along the edge of the pile rather than joining in. Once Hurts was exposed to Wright, he approached and ripped the ball from Hurts' possession. The turnover was the Eagles' first of the season on the tush push. According to Bears safety Kevin Byard, defensive coordinator Dennis Allen viewed the play from a rugby perspective and stressed the importance of being "disciplined on the edges". The Pittsburgh Steelers had attempted the tush push twice against the Bears a week prior, one of which was a trick play in which they pretended to go up the middle before running to the outside for a 55-yard gain. Wright, who was assigned to the perimeter to prevent a repeat feint, explained afterward that "nobody blocked me, so I was able to get in there and pry it out and from there, just to get on top of it."

== Criticism and ban attempts ==
=== Legality and legitimacy in football complaints ===
Upon the tush push's rise in usage, a majority of NFL teams filed complaints about the legality of the play, citing the "assisting the runner" penalty. The play takes advantage of an NFL rule that was modified in 2005 to allow players to assist the ball carrier in the form of pushing, which was previously banned, although "pulling" and "carrying" are still prohibited. In Week 8 of the 2022 season, the NFL's officiating department issued a clarification regarding whether the play should be penalized: "This is not a foul, because what he is doing is pushing the runner. Players are allowed to push, but they are not allowed to encircle and pull to assist the runner." The play is currently banned in high school football due to being under a similar "helping the runner" rule from the National Federation of State High School Associations.

"A great play essentially creates freedom for an individual to move away from the pile of men. The Tush Push is a shove into the pile."

— Sally Jenkins, The Washington Post.

Green Bay Packers head coach Matt LaFleur and NFL analyst Bill Cowher criticized the design of the tush push, with both separately describing it as "not a great football play" that rather belongs in rugby, and LaFleur referred to "injury concerns", saying "we want to just kinda get out in front of that and be a little bit more proactive". Sally Jenkins of The Washington Post called the tush push a "boring, brutish play" that went against the modern game's appeal of "the ability of an individual to find space and move into at speed." Philadelphia Eagles owner Jeff Lurie countered these arguments by stating that the forward pass was once controversial during the sport's early days before eventually becoming a mainstay in the modern era.

Christopher L. Gasper of The Boston Globe felt the tush push actively lowered the entertainment value of the sport, stating that it made short-yardage situations non-competitive and predictable. This argument continued to grow from fans and players alike when the Eagles ran the play four consecutive times against the New York Giants during a Week 6 Thursday Night Football matchup in 2025.

At the end of the 2025 season, a poll released by The Athletic showed that 53% of the 4,920 readers who voted wanted the play out of football. However, the publication also reported in another poll given to NFL players that 83.8% of them were against the play being banned. This poll also determined that defensive players were less in favor of banning the tush push than offensive players. One anonymous defensive player said that banning the tush push would also mean that "you're looking at banning quarterback sneaks. It's the same thing, just better executed."

=== Safety concerns ===
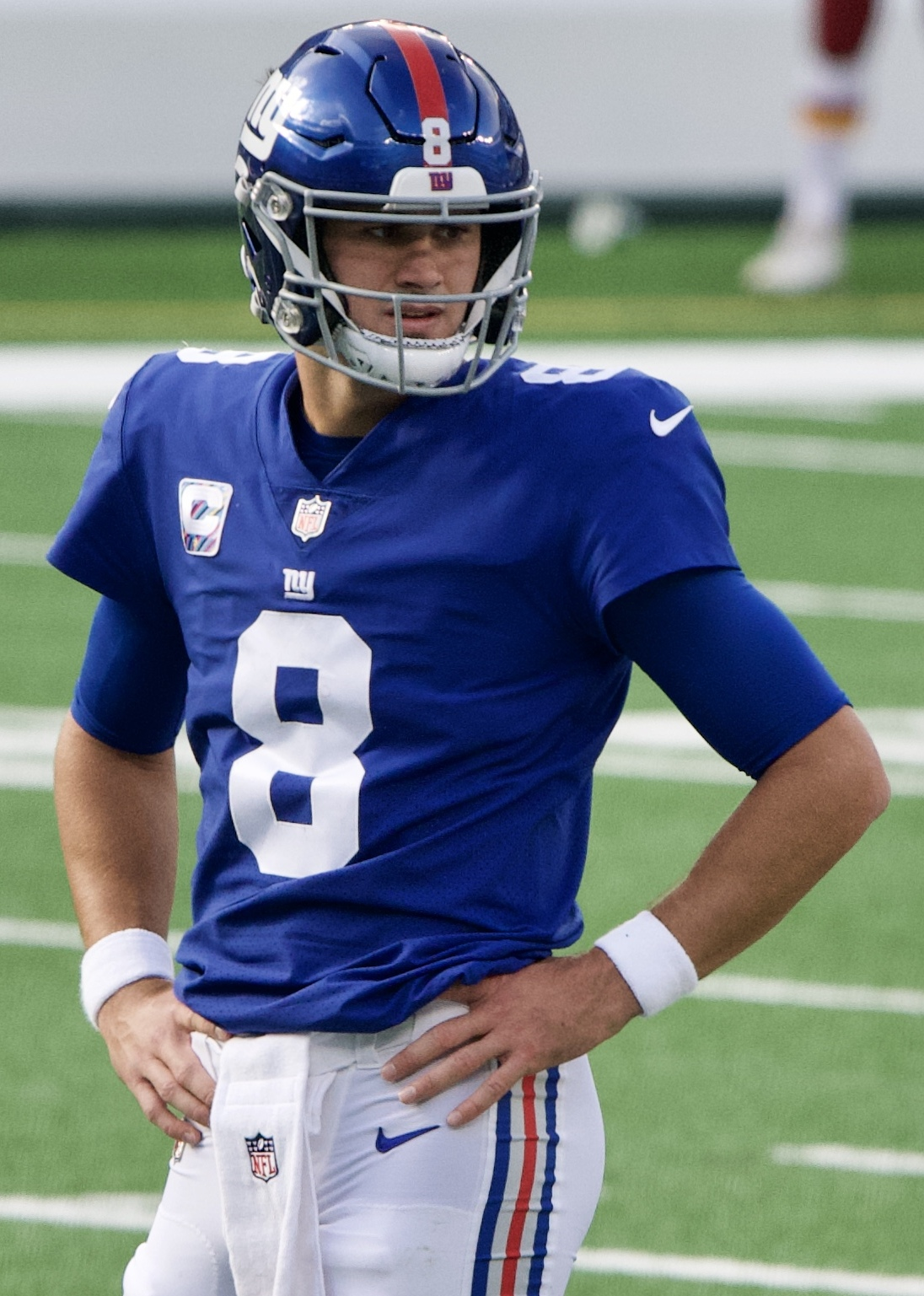
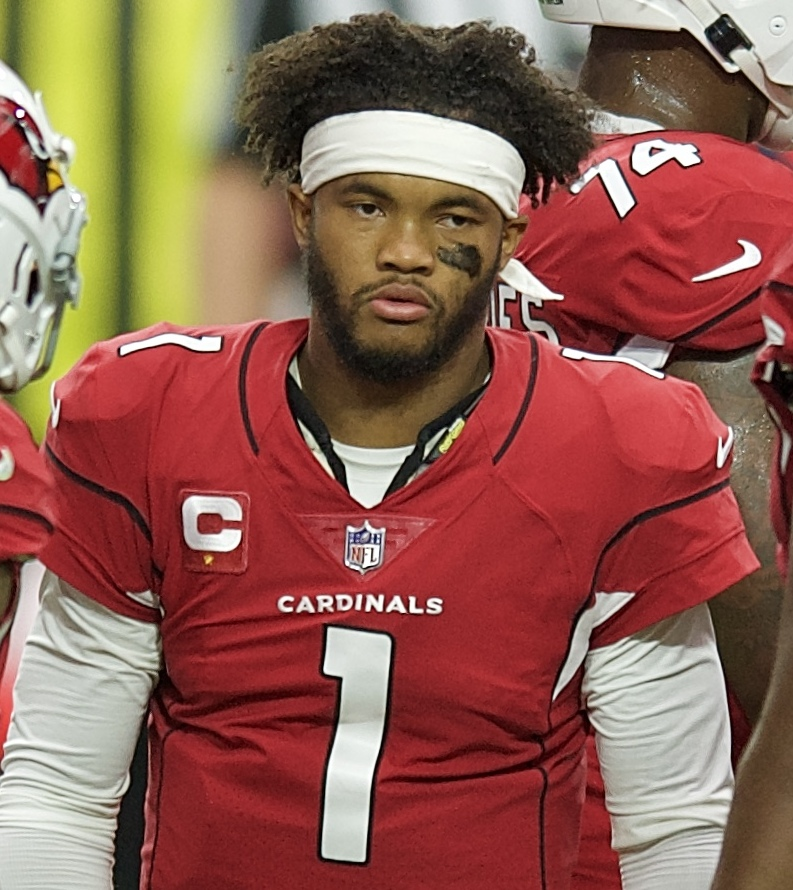
Quarterbacks Daniel Jones and Kyler Murray opposed using the tush push due to injury concerns when running it previously.

Concerns over players' safety have also been raised regarding the tush push. Despite his team's usage of the play, Buffalo Bills head coach Sean McDermott stated that it is "potentially contrary to the health and safety of the players". Quarterbacks Daniel Jones and Kyler Murray requested their teams not call the play after nearly getting injured during previous attempts at running it. Pundits have compared the tush push to the flying wedge, a similar play the sport banned over a century before because of its contribution to serious and fatal injuries. Former Eagles center and prominent tush push participant Jason Kelce acknowledged it as a "grueling play" but added that football is "a sport that comes down to physicality". Denver Broncos head coach Sean Payton also spoke in favor of the tush push, calling it "one of the safest plays in football".

In 2023, NFL investigated the potential injury risk of the play and concluded "nothing notable" was found, although NFL commissioner Roger Goodell stated there were other aspects about the play to consider. On February 26, 2025, NFL executive Troy Vincent said no injury was suffered on a tush push play in 2024, per the league's internal data.

=== Officiating difficulties ===
During a Week 2 matchup between the Eagles and the Kansas City Chiefs in 2025, the NFL said that the officials missed a false start call on at least one occasion when the Eagles ran the tush push. As a result, the league office announced that it would instruct its referees to tightly scrutinize any future instance of the play. Negative criticism further arose the next week during the Eagles' narrow victory over the Los Angeles Rams, with two false starts being missed when the Eagles ran it; controversy continued as the New Orleans Saints attempted to utilize the same play against the Seattle Seahawks, only to receive a false start penalty under similar circumstances that were not recognized by officials during the game in Philadelphia earlier that day. Vincent acknowledged the continued difficulty in officiating the play, citing the line judge and down judge having trouble gauging the actions in the neutral zone when the offensive linemen tightly line up around it.

Additional officiating controversy occurred during Week 8 of the 2025 season against the New York Giants. During a fourth-and-1 play in the second quarter, Giants outside linebacker Kayvon Thibodeaux had stripped the ball from Hurts when the Eagles attempted the tush push. However, the officials ruled that Hurts' forward progress had been stopped before the fumble occurred, making the turnover unable to be reviewed. Giants head coach Brian Daboll attempted to challenge the first down but lost the appeal. Despite this, officiating scrutiny increased; the Eagles were flagged twice during a Week 16 matchup against the Washington Commanders when attempting the play.

=== NFL ban proposals ===
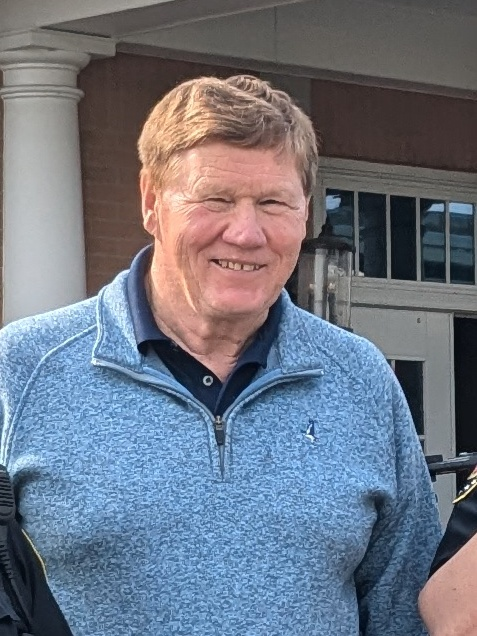
Green Bay Packers president Mark Murphy led the attempts to ban the tush push in the NFL.

In February 2025, the Packers submitted a proposal to the NFL's competition committee to ban the tush push, with the play being a topic of discussion at the Annual League Meeting in March. The proposal was presented and authored by Packers president Mark Murphy, who cited player safety concerns as his main reason for attempting to ban the play. Sirianni spoke against the ban proposal, calling it "a little unfair" to target the play merely for the fact that it was highly successful for Philadelphia, and added that the team had worked tirelessly to perfect it. Other teams opposed banning, as some had begun experimenting with the play themselves. On April 1, 2025, the league declined to hold a formal vote on the Packers' proposed ban after an informal poll showed the teams to be evenly divided on the issue, short of the 3/4 majority that would have been needed to implement the ban.

A second attempt to ban the play was submitted, also by the Packers on May 21, 2025, during the league's annual spring meetings. Lurie and Kelce both defended the play during the meeting, emphasizing the importance of its safety. The attempt was two votes short, receiving 22 of 24 needed to ban the play. The other nine teams aside from the Eagles that voted against banning the play were Baltimore Ravens, Cleveland Browns, Detroit Lions, Jacksonville Jaguars, Miami Dolphins, New England Patriots, New Orleans Saints, New York Jets, and Tennessee Titans. Lions head coach Dan Campbell attributed being a "purist" of the sport as his reason for keeping the play legal, stating "if you take something out of the game, then you take another thing out of the game, then pretty soon you're not wearing pads, and then you're playing 30 minutes. A team found a niche, they're good at it. It's unique, it's physical. I don't want to take anything else out of the game - I just want to leave the game alone."

Murphy stepped down from his position as Packers CEO and president in July, requiring a new ban proposal to have a new author, more support, and more votes. Despite the tush push remaining allowed, Kelce predicted that the play would eventually be banned, saying "I think that there's a lot of people within the league, at multiple levels, that want the play to be gone, which is fine. I think [the Eagles] will still go back to running quarterback sneak, and I'm sure they'll figure out ways to be successful. I'm not really that concerned with it, to be very candid."

During the 2026 annual spring meeting, no proposals to ban the tush push were submitted, ensuring the play's legality for the upcoming season.

== In popular culture ==
The tush push remains popular in the city of Philadelphia, and members of the Philadelphia Police Department reenacted the play during the Super Bowl LIX victory parade, while the Eagles' home stadium Lincoln Financial Field would offer "Tush Push Taters" in their concessions during the 2026 Philadelphia Eagles season. Jason Kelce would be featured in a pre-recorded video on the game show Jeopardy! Masters and included the name of the play as part of a clue to an answer. Comedian Shane Gillis, a devout Philadelphia sports fan, hosted the 2025 ESPY Awards and aired a sketch that humorously claimed that he created the tush push. The play was referenced in The Simpsons episode "Irrational Treasure", written by Philadelphia native Christine Nangle, where the characters visit the city.

After being absent in past installments, the tush push was included on Madden NFL 27. EA Sports had wanted to introduce the play in the franchise previously, but waited until it survived the NFL ban attempts before deciding the time was right.

In November 2023, Pennsylvania entrepreneur Deanna Slamans filed a U.S. trademark application for "Tush Push" for use on T-shirts, several weeks before the Philadelphia Eagles filed their own application for the term. The Eagles' application was subsequently suspended by the United States Patent and Trademark Office because of Slamans's earlier-filed application. Slamans's application was registered on October 28, 2025.

== See also ==
- Quarterback sneak
- Flying wedge
- Scrum (rugby)
