= 1987 in Scotland =

- Centuries: 18th; 19th; 20th; 21st
- Decades: 1960s; 1970s; 1980s; 1990s; 2000s
- See also: List of years in Scotland; Timeline of Scottish history 1987 in: The UK • England • Wales • Elsewhere; Scottish football: 1986–87 • 1987–88; 1987 in Scottish television

Events from the year 1987 in Scotland.

== Incumbents ==
- Secretary of State for Scotland and Keeper of the Great Seal – Malcolm Rifkind

=== Law officers ===
- Lord Advocate – Lord Cameron of Lochbroom
- Solicitor General for Scotland – Peter Fraser

=== Judiciary ===
- Lord President of the Court of Session and Lord Justice General – Lord Emslie
- Lord Justice Clerk – Lord Ross
- Chairman of the Scottish Land Court – Lord Elliott

== Events ==
- 20 May – The Abolition of Domestic Rates Etc. (Scotland) Act 1987 and the Criminal Justice (Scotland) Act 1987 both receive Royal Assent.
- 11 June – UK general election: the Conservatives win just 10 of the 72 seats in Scotland, but are re-elected for a third consecutive term in office due to the scale of their election victory in England. Amongst the new MPs elected in Scotland are: future First Minister of Scotland Alex Salmond, who gains Banff and Buchan for the Scottish National Party from the Conservative Party, and future Chancellor of the Exchequer Alistair Darling of the Labour Party. Darling would later debate Alex Salmond on the topic of Scottish independence 27 years later; weeks ahead of a referendum on the issue.
- 3 July – Richard Branson and Per Lindstrand become the first people to complete a transatlantic flight in a hot air balloon aboard the balloon Virgin Atlantic Flyer, ditching a mile off the Mull of Kintyre.
- 27 August – Robert Maclennan, MP for Caithness and Sutherland, replaces David Owen as Leader of the SDP.
- 23 November – First McDonald's hamburger fast food restaurant in Scotland opens in Dundee.
- December – First UNESCO World Heritage Sites in Scotland designated: the Antonine Wall as part of the Frontiers of the Roman Empire; and St Kilda for its natural habitats.
- Scottish Christian Alliance charitable organisation is formed.
- Summerlee Heritage Park opened in Coatbridge.

== Births ==
- 9 February – Rose Leslie, actress
- 20 February – Eilidh Doyle, Olympic athlete
- 20 March
  - Patrick Boyle, footballer
  - Kevin Smith, footballer
- 15 May – Andy Murray, tennis player
- 26 May – Krysty Wilson-Cairns, screenwriter
- 6 June – Kyle Falconer, singer and guitarist (The View)
- 20 July – Nicola Benedetti, classical violinist
- 6 August – Leanne Crichton, footballer
- 8 August – Katie Leung, actress
- 25 August – Amy Macdonald, singer-songwriter
- 6 October – Eunice Olumide, fashion model, actress, designer and broadcast presenter
- 7 October – Lauren Mayberry, singer-songwriter
- 8 October – Frankie Brown, footballer
- 28 November – Karen Gillan, actress and filmmaker
- 13 December – Ryan McHenry, film director and social media personality (died 2015)

== Deaths ==
- 3 January – Alex Campbell, folk singer (born 1931)
- 5 May – Sir Hugh Fraser, 2nd Baronet, retailer (born 1936)
- 6 June – Fulton Mackay, actor (born 1922)

== The arts ==
- 1 May – Glasgow band Deacon Blue release their debut album Raintown.
- 10 August – Liz Lochhead's play Mary Queen of Scots Got Her Head Chopped Off premières at the Edinburgh Festival.
- Edinburgh band Swamptrash form.
- Publication of William Boyd's novel The New Confessions.
- Publication of Ian Rankin's Knots and Crosses, first of the Inspector Rebus detective novels, set around Edinburgh.
- First staging of Tony Roper's play The Steamie, in Glasgow.

== See also ==
- 1987 in Northern Ireland
