= Jim Delahunt =

Scottish sports presenter (born 1962)

James Martin Delahunt (born 1962 in Irvine) is a Scottish sports presenter and newspaper columnist, best known for his 8-year tenure as presenter of STV's long-running sports programme Scotsport (1998–2006) and as a sports columnist with The Scottish Sun newspaper.

== Early life ==
Delahunt attended St Andrew's Saltcoats secondary school for six years between 1974 and 1980. After leaving school, he went on to study Business at Glasgow Caledonian University for four years, where he graduated with a bachelor of arts (BA) qualification in 1984.

== Career ==
Delahunt started his journalism career as a racing columnist on the Scottish Farmer in 1984, two years later he eventually started a full-time journalism career on the Kilmarnock Free Press in 1986 before joining West Sound Radio the following year, and was launch editor of The Daily Winner sports paper in 1988. He went from there to Radio Clyde for two years, and joined Scottish in 1990, where he was a sports presenter/correspondent on the lunchtime and evening editions of Scotland Today for around eight years until 1998, during this time, he also presented the racing reports on Scotsport Extra Time throughout the early-mid 1990s and presented a spin-off programme to Scotsport on satellite and cable TV called The Football Show that aired on the short-lived channel Sky Scottish between November 1996 until that channel ceased broadcasting in May 1998.

In June 1998, Delahunt replaced Jim White as main presenter of the long-running sports programme Scotsport (including spin-off programmes Extra Time, Football First, Scotsport Plus, Monday Night Live, Scotsport Rugby Round-Up, Scotsport SPL, Scotsport Fanzone as well as the main show itself), Delahunt had grown up watching Scotsport with Arthur Montford as the host back in the day and had been a lifelong fan ever since, plus he also presented all of STV's live football coverage and some rugby coverage on the channel since 1998, Delahunt had previously covered Jim White as a relief presenter on Scotsport Extra Time on a couple of occasions beforehand, firstly in November 1995 and again in January 1998.

As well as presenting Scotsport, Delahunt had been racing correspondent of the Sunday Herald since its launch in February 1999, and had been a racing columnist on The Scottish Farmer since 1984

Delahunt joined Setanta Sports in August 2006 after more than eight years as anchorman of STV's sport programme Scotsport, where he presented all of Setanta's live and highlights coverage of Scottish football until Setanta Sports ceased broadcasting in June 2009.

On 17 September 2008, Delahunt returned to STV for a short period as a freelance anchor of the station's UEFA Champions League highlights shows. In 2010 he began reporting on Scottish Premier League games for ESPN.

In 2010 he was announced as the new 'anchorman' of Radio Clyde's Superscoreboard football phone in programme for season 2010–11. In March 2015, Delahunt resigned from his job at Radio Clyde after being found guilty of drunk driving.

He writes a column for the Scottish Sun, focusing on betting tips for football and horse racing, one of his main passions since childhood.

== Personal life ==
Jim's main sporting interests are football, horse-racing, golf and boxing. He played schools and amateur football to the age of 22 in 1984 and collected six winner's medals at school and youth level with St Andrews Academy and Ardrossan Boys' Club.

He has been riding horses since the age of 16 in 1978 but only took out an amateur riders' flat racing licence at the advanced age of 33 in 1995. He competed in about a dozen races, with two third places at Hamilton his best efforts on some very slow horses.

He was also one of the tallest jockeys in Scotland, standing at 6 feet tall.

Jim's sporting heroes are Muhammad Ali and Lester Piggott - who he was delighted to have met both. He referred to it as "lovely stuff".
