= 1988 in Scotland =

- Centuries: 18th; 19th; 20th; 21st
- Decades: 1960s; 1970s; 1980s; 1990s; 2000s
- See also: List of years in Scotland; Timeline of Scottish history 1988 in: The UK • England • Wales • Elsewhere; Scottish football: 1987–88 • 1988–89; 1988 in Scottish television

Events from the year 1988 in Scotland.

== Incumbents ==
- Secretary of State for Scotland and Keeper of the Great Seal – Malcolm Rifkind

=== Law officers ===
- Lord Advocate – Lord Cameron of Lochbroom
- Solicitor General for Scotland – Peter Fraser

=== Judiciary ===
- Lord President of the Court of Session and Lord Justice General – Lord Emslie
- Lord Justice Clerk – Lord Ross
- Chairman of the Scottish Land Court – Lord Elliott

== Events ==
- March – Seafield Colliery at Kirkcaldy closes.
- 26 April–26 September – Glasgow Garden Festival. Bell's Bridge is built in connection with it.
- 21 May – "Sermon on the Mound": Prime Minister Margaret Thatcher, addresses the General Assembly of the Church of Scotland.
- 6 July – Piper Alpha oil rig in the North Sea explodes and results in the death of 167 workers.
- 7 August – Scotland on Sunday newspaper launched.
- 2 November – Housing (Scotland) Act 1988, receives Royal Assent.
- 10 November – The Scottish National Party win the Glasgow Govan by-election from Labour with a swing of 33%.
- 6–10 December – The 1988 European Curling Championships take place in Perth.
- 21 December – Pan Am Flight 103 explodes over the town of Lockerbie, Dumfries and Galloway, and kills a total of 270 people – including all 259 on board. It is believed that the cause of the explosion was a terrorist bomb.
- David Jones founds DMA Design, predecessor of video game developer Rockstar North, in Dundee.

== Births ==
- 7 January – Alan Lowing, footballer
- 2 June – Grado (Graeme Stevely), professional wrestler and screen actor
- 21 July – Chris Mitchell, footballer (died 2016)
- 22 October – Sharon Rooney, actress
- 5 December – Omar Raza, actor
- 30 December – Leon Jackson, pop singer

== Deaths ==
- 11 February – Marion Crawford, Scottish educator and governess to Princess Margaret and Queen Elizabeth II (born 1909)
- 12 April – Harry McShane, socialist (born 1891)
- 26 August – Oscar Marzaroli, photographer (born 1933 in Italy)

== The Arts ==
- August – The Proclaimers release their album Sunshine on Leith with lead single "I'm Gonna Be (500 Miles)".

== See also ==
- 1988 in Northern Ireland
