= Sally McNair =

Sally McNair (born 1956) is a female television sports journalist in Scotland. She worked as a presenter and reporter at STV on the world's longest-running TV sports programme, "Scotsport" from 1982.

== Career ==
In 1982, McNair joined Scotsport and became the first female sports presenter in television in Scotland.

In 1990 she began presenting an afternoon show on BBC Radio Scotland.

She has worked at BBC Scotland and presented the shorter and weekend "Reporting Scotland" bulletins for many years. Occasionally, she presented the main flagship programme when Sally Magnusson or Jackie Bird were away.

In over 30 years in TV journalism, Sally has also worked at ITN on Channel 4's original breakfast news programme, "The Channel Four Daily".

She presented the late news on the day of the official opening of BBC Scotland's new studios at Pacific Quay in Glasgow. The bulletin was being presented from an open-plan area of the building, and this resulted in most of the news being delivered over the noise of a party taking place in the building.

== Escape to Glasgow documentary ==
On 14 November 2010, BBC Scotland aired the documentary Escape to Glasgow, in which McNair meets some of Britain's first evacuees, and retraces their journeys. The programme was aired for a second time in December 2010.
