= Morag McLellan =

Scottish field hockey player

Personal information
- Born: 2 July 1990 (age 36)

Sport
- Sport: Field hockey
National team
Years	Team	Caps	Goals
2010-2014	Scotland		-

Morag McLellan (born 2 July 1990) is a Scottish female field hockey player who plays for the Scotland women's national field hockey team. She has represented Scotland in few international competitions including the 2013 Women's EuroHockey Nations Championship, 2010 Commonwealth Games, and 2014 Commonwealth Games.
