= Jim White (presenter) =

Scottish radio and television presenter

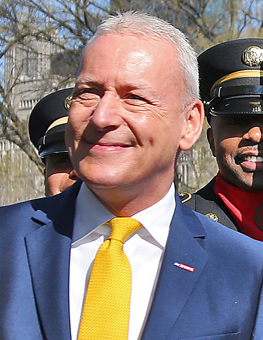
- White in 2015
- Born: James White; 16 July 1957 (age 69); Glasgow, Scotland
- Years active: 1979–present
- Known for: Sky Sports; Talksport

James White (born 16 July 1957) is a Scottish radio and television presenter. He currently co-presents the weekday mid-morning sports programme White and Jordan on talkSPORT, alongside businessman and media personality Simon Jordan. White is also known for his work with previous employer, Sky Sports.

== Early life ==
White was born on 16 July 1957 in Glasgow, Scotland. After completing a pre-entry journalist course at Napier College in Edinburgh, White began his media career with Scottish & Universal Newspapers in 1974.

== Broadcasting career ==
=== Television ===
In 1979, White moved into television as an entertainment reporter on STV's flagship Scotland Today news programme. In 1986, he was appointed sports reporter and one of his first assignments was to travel with the Scotland team to the World Cup Finals in Mexico. In 1988, he became the main host of Scotsport. In 1990 White presented coverage of Scotland's campaign in the World Cup and in 1991 he was part of the team that won a Scottish BAFTA.

White became presenter of STV's Scotsport in 1989, succeeding Arthur Montford. He also presented its spinoff show Scotsport Extra Time.

White joined Sky Sports in 1998. In June 2003 he travelled to Senegal with Arsenal captain Patrick Vieira to report on Vieira's Diambers charity.

He is especially known for his round-the-clock presenting marathon on transfer deadline day.

In August 2019, White was criticised for his reporting style of the news that Bury FC had been expelled from the EFL. He was seen reporting for Sky Sports in front of a countdown clock.

In June 2021, Sky Sports announced that White was leaving the channel after 23 years as a presenter.

=== Radio ===
In September 2016, White took over Talksport's morning programme from Colin Murray.

== Personal life ==
White was fined £750 and banned from driving for a year in 2005 after refusing a breath test.

In 2010 he was stopped from boarding a British Airways flight due to being drunk. In October 2021, he stated on his TalkSport radio programme that he had been sober for 10 years.
