= Trevor Every =

Welsh cricketer

Personal information
- Full name: Trevor Every
- Born: 19 December 1909; Llanelli, Carmarthenshire, Wales
- Died: 20 January 1990 (aged 80); Newport, Monmouthshire, Wales
- Batting: Right-handed
- Role: Wicket-keeper

Domestic team information
- Years: Team
- 1929–1934: Glamorgan

Career statistics
Competition	First-class
Matches	128
Runs scored	2,518
Batting average	16.35
100s/50s	1/8
Top score	116
Balls bowled	48
Wickets	0
Bowling average	–
5 wickets in innings	0
10 wickets in match	0
Best bowling	–
Catches/stumpings	108/72
- Source: Cricinfo, 13 June 2012

Trevor Every (19 December 1909 – 20 January 1990) was a Welsh first-class cricketer. A wicketkeeper, he played with Glamorgan from 1929 to 1934.

Every's only first-class century, an innings of 116, was made against Worcestershire in 1932. In the opening game of the 1934 season he had trouble picking up the ball and consulted an eye specialist. Every was going blind and was forced to retire at the age of 25.

Glamorgan organised an appeal on his behalf, which raised more than a thousand pounds. After losing his sight completely later in 1934, Every trained as a stenographer with the Royal National Institute for the Blind, for whom he worked for many years.
