= Richie Gray (rugby coach) =

Scottish television presenter

Richie Gray (age 56–57) is a Scottish rugby union and American football coach, former rugby union player, and television presenter.

Gray is from Galashiels, and was an age-grade international player for Scotland. He attended Galashiels Academy, and was a part of a Scottish Schools squad that toured New Zealand in 1988. He went on to attend Moray House School of Education and Sport at the University of Edinburgh, and competed at the 1992 Students World Cup in Italy.

Since 1994, Gray has been developing rugby training aids, founding Global Sports Innovation, a company notable for a piece of equipment called the 'Collision King'. Gray also worked for Scottish Rugby for 12 years, working until 2006 as academy manager.

Gray fronted STV's coverage of the 2007 Rugby World Cup, and also presented STV's weekly programme, Scotsport Rugby Sunday. The show began on Sunday 11 November 2007 and lasted only one series.

In 2013, Gray became a breakdown skills coach for South Africa, and coached them during the 2015 Rugby World Cup. He has also coached for Scotland and Fiji. He has also coached many clubs, including RC Toulon.

Gray has also coached several NFL teams, including the Miami Dolphins. He was an advisor to the Philadelphia Eagles on the Tush Push, a controversial variant on the quarterback sneak with a very high success rate in short yardage situations.
