= Gerry McNee =

Scottish football journalist

Gerald McNee is a Scottish football journalist, who made his name in the Scottish football press with the Scottish Daily Express and Daily Star in the 1970s. He was also a match commentator from 1974 to 2004. McNee also wrote several books about Celtic. He was nicknamed 'The voice of football' by Scotsport, for whom he commentated.

McNee also wrote In the Footsteps of the Quiet Man: The Inside Story of the Cult Film, a book about the film The Quiet Man. The book is described as "a revealing and touching account of when Hollywood came to beautiful Connemara in the West of Ireland."

While a sports writer with the Daily Star, McNee had a dispute with Celtic manager Billy McNeill.

McNee retired from broadcasting at the end of the 2003–04 season.

== Works ==
- And You'll Never Walk Alone 1972, ISBN 0901311375
- A Million Miles for Celtic - An Autobiography Stanley Paul, 1982, ISBN 978-0091502409
- In the Footsteps of the Quiet Man: The Inside Story of the Cult Film Mainstream Publishing, 2008, ISBN 978-1845964177
- A Lifetime in Paradise: The Jimmy McGrory Story Irnwurks Media, 2013
