= Helping the runner =

Gridiron football penalty

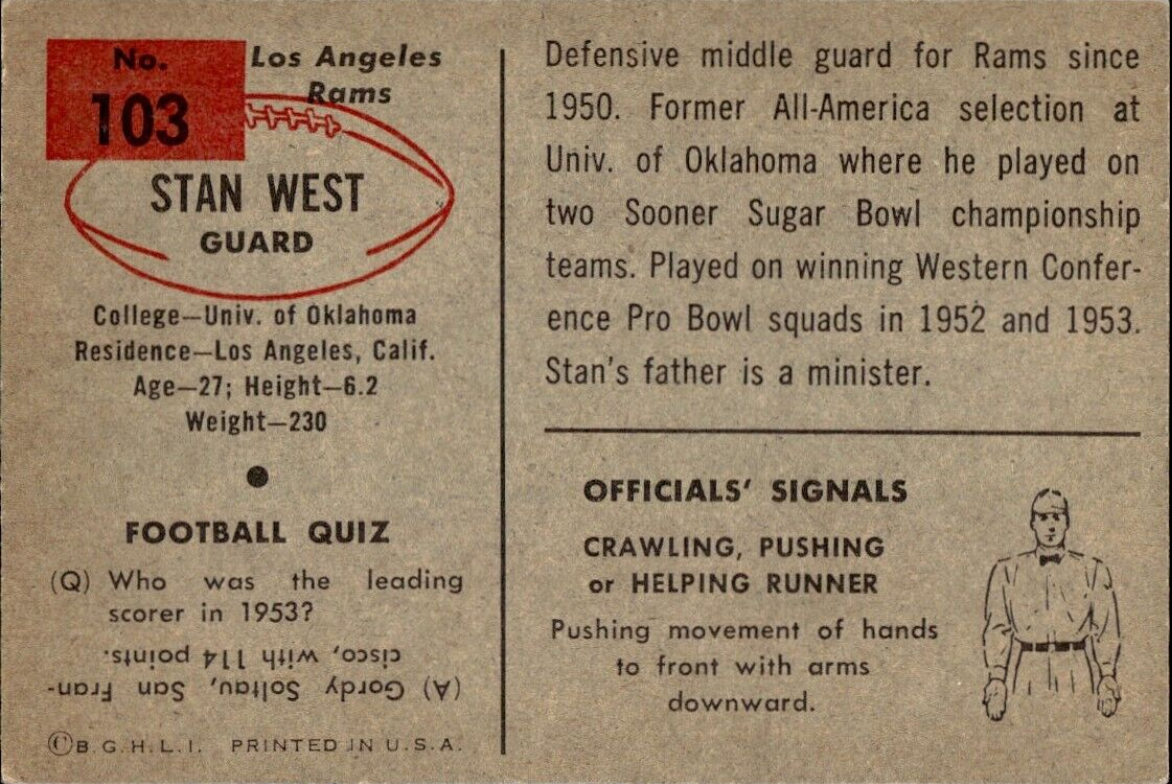
Image of the reverse side of a 1954 football card (Stan West), which includes the referee signal for helping the runner at the bottom right.

Helping the runner, also called assisting the runner and aiding the runner, is a penalty in gridiron football that occurs when an offensive player pulls or carries the ball carrier in order to gain additional yards. Though originally a common call, the penalty has become extremely rare, having last been called at the professional level in 1991. In the National Football League (NFL), a violation results in a 10-yard penalty, while it is five yards in college football and high school football.

== History ==
The foul was first created in either the late 1890s or early 1900s. An early use of the penalty was in 1904, when The Philadelphia Inquirer wrote, "On the offense the team has made wonderful improvement, especially in helping the runner. In the Columbia game it was seldom that the man with the ball was not pushed or pulled for an extra yard or so." It was originally a 15-yard penalty.

The official NCAA rule book in 1950 stated, "The runner shall not grasp, or be pulled by, any teammate, nor shall any teammate push the runner or lift him from the ground while the ball is in play. Penalty for "helping the runner" is 15 yards from the spot of the foul." In 1958, Dick Becker of the Lincoln Journal Star wrote, "Colorado was assessed 15 yards late in the game for "helping the runner." Although it is seldom called, the rule book explains it thusly: ". . .but the runner shall not grasp a teammate and no other player of his team shall grasp, push, lift or charge into him to assist in gaining forward progress." The penalty in college and high school was later reduced to 10 yards, and finally 5 yards. The NCAA permitted the pushing of a runner in 2013. Pushing still remains illegal in high school games.

The NFL and CFL continued with the foul as 10 yards. In 2005, the National Football League made the penalty only for pulling and carrying, removing the flag in cases of pushing. Pushing the runner eventually became a key strategy in the NFL in the early 2020s with the Philadelphia Eagles adopting the "tush push" or "Brotherly Shove," a short-yardage variant of the quarterback sneak in which the backfield pushes the quarterback through the defensive line. An attempt to restore the penalty during the 2025 offseason fell two votes short of ratification, with the Eagles particularly vocal about their opposition to the proposed rule.

The last time helping the runner was called at the professional level was in 1991, when Kansas City Chiefs center Tim Grunhard pulled wide receiver Robb Thomas in the divisional round of the playoffs.

The United Football League reintroduced the penalty in the 2026 UFL season, specifically in the case of the tush push: its rule prohibits the backfield pushing the quarterback and offensive line forward in a mass formation immediately after a snap.
