= Arthur Montford =

Scottish journalist (1929–2014)

Arthur Montford (25 May 1929 – 26 November 2014) was a Scottish Television sports journalist, best known for his 32-year tenure as the presenter of Scottish Television's Scotsport. Although he was most associated with football, he covered a number of other sports for ITV, notably golf.

== Early life ==
Montford was born on 25 May 1929 to the son of a journalist, Sid, who spent a long career at the Glasgow Evening News and Daily Record. He was raised in Greenock and educated at Greenock Academy after the family moved there from Glasgow. Greenock and the Academy itself gave him a lifelong love of the town's club Morton F.C. and his friend from schooldays, Douglas Rae, owned the club later on in Montford's lifetime. Whilst at school, he was one of a band of rebels who tried — unsuccessfully — to introduce football to the rugby-playing school.

== Journalism ==
Montford told the academy rector, Mr. William Dewar, that he would become a journalist and, after completion of his National Service, he joined the News as an office boy, before making the graduation through the ranks to reporter, working for the News; then the Daily Record before joining the sports desk of the Evening Times.

While there, he covered numerous sports, but it was football that became his main focus, and he was asked by the BBC's well-known producer Peter Thomson to do some match reports for radio. These went well as a radio broadcaster, and, when BBC sports editor John Wilson joined Scottish Television in 1957, he asked Montford to join him in the new commercial visual age.

Montford's first audition in Maryhill Burgh Hall was dismal, but he was given another chance at the Theatre Royal and more than passed muster. With his pleasant, distinctive voice, a singular asset; he joined Scottish Television in August 1957 as a continuity announcer and sports reporter, where Montford shared the opening night announcing duties with Jimmy Nairn, He was then chosen to present STV's new sports programme, Scotsport (originally Sports Desk), where he remained as presenter for 32 years. In all, he hosted over 2,000 editions of the programme that made him a household name across Scotland. It was a golden era in Scottish football, and Montford was at the heart of it from the late-1950s through the glory days of the 1960s, the 1970s and all the way through to the late-1980s, always finding something positive to say about the game – even in Argentina in 1978.

During his time on Scotsport, Montford became famous for his trademark checkered pattern sports jackets, and some classic lines of football commentary, including What a Stramash! and Disaster for Scotland!, He also presented Radio Clyde’s version of Desert Island Discs (billed as Montford's Meeting Place) where he interviewed many famous people who dropped by for a chat with the STV legend that was an unmissable sample of Clyde's weekend schedule in the 1970s and 1980s as well as writing the Scotsport Annual among other books.

Throughout a long and hectic career, He interviewed all the greats from Bobby Jones, Ben Hogan, Jack Nicklaus, Arnold Palmer and Gary Player to name amongst a few famous sport players whom Montford had the pleasure of meeting over time.

Despite being committed to Scotsport, Montford continued to continuity announce with STV by covering irregular shifts as a relief continuity announcer (often out-of-vision, sometimes in-vision) on occasions of holidays, illness or other staff absences - where he would often read the lunchtime and evening Scottish news bulletins, announce the daytime and evening programmes as billed and close the station at around midnight with, of course, the friendly and reassuring closedown sequence when “we hoped you enjoyed our programmes today and you will join us again in the morning at 9.30am”, His easy confidence made him one of the station's most popular personalities.

He also presented the Scottish version of World of Sport on STV and Grampian - with live coverage from England of events which were often not shown in their entirety due to the regional sporting events taking place in Scotland, Scotsport Special was also aired on Cup Final day, when the Scottish Cup Final was taking place on the same day as the Wembley event, with the Wrestling also being moved from its pre-lunchtime slot on Cup Final days back to the expected 16:00 slot in Scotland. Montford also commentated or presented items on many other sports, particularly ice hockey – a favourite of his – and golf, where his work for ITV brought him to the notice of a wider public.

During the 1978 FIFA World Cup, a technical fault with the feed from Argentina prevented ITV from broadcasting Hugh Johns' commentary on the Scotland vs Peru game, so Montford's commentary, originally only intended for Scottish viewers, was used on the entire network (the same fault affected the BBC in reverse, with Scottish viewers having to listen to David Coleman instead of Archie MacPherson).

Montford's final edition of the long-running Scotsport programme was live coverage of the 1989 Scottish Cup Final. After retiring from television at the age of sixty years, Montford left STV and continued to comment on Scottish football, both in the national press and in the matchday programme at Morton, he also concentrated on playing golf at Glasgow Golf Club at Killermont. The Variety Club marked his retirement in 1989 with an all-star dinner. Among the guests were Andy Cameron, Ian St John, and John Henderson, the former headmaster who, in the early-1950s, persuaded Montford to write to the BBC for a radio audition.

In 1990, he narrated the film documentary Scotland: The World Cup Story. In July 1991, Montford returned to STV to host a week-long stint of five Evening Call shows In late-2010, Montford served as an occasional commentator on the Greenock Morton webcast.

In May 2010, Montford received the SPFA Special Merit award for his services to football broadcasting and journalism alongside fellow sports broadcaster Archie MacPherson.

== Other positions ==
He served as a director of Greenock Morton for several years under the chairmanship of his close friend Douglas Rae. After stepping down as a director, Montford continued his affiliation with the club as an Honorary Vice-president.

In 1974, Montford was elected as Rector of the University of Glasgow, the first sports journalist to receive the honour. He remained in the position until 1977. he was also resident and captain of Glasgow Golf Club for several years

Montford wrote a column for Scottish golf magazine, Bunkered. His recollections of some of golf's greatest players, moments, and tournaments were popular with the magazine's readers and he was the title's longest-serving regular contributor.

He died on 26 November 2014 aged 85. He was married twice, his second wife Jacqueline dying in 2013. He is survived by his son Ewen, and his two grandchildren and four step-grandchildren. His funeral was held in Bearsden on 3 December.

Academic offices
Preceded by Jimmy Reid	Rector of the University of Glasgow; 1974–1977	Succeeded by John L. Bell
