= Scotsport =

Scottish sports TV programme (1957–2008)

- Genre: Sport
- Presented by: Arthur Montford; Jim White; Jim Delahunt; Grant Stott; Andy Walker; Richie Gray (Rugby)
- Country of origin: Scotland

Production
- Running time: 60–90 minutes (including adverts)
- Production company: STV News

Original release
- Network: STV (Scottish/Grampian), ITV Border Scotland (1987–2008)
- Release: 18 September 1957 – 22 May 2008

Related
- STV Sports Centre; Champions League Live

Scotsport is a Scottish sports television programme, broadcast on STV in northern and central Scotland between 1957 and 2008, as well as on ITV Border in southern Scotland.

It was first broadcast in 1957 as Sports Desk and continued until the end of its weekly football highlights show in May 2008.

== History ==
Launching less than a month after the opening of Scottish Television, the programme first aired on 18 September 1957, as Sports Desk. The Scotsport title was adopted a short time later, and the vast majority of its coverage was of football, rather than sport in general, as the name might imply. The football coverage, in turn, concentrated mostly on Scottish Premier League clubs. The show also followed Scottish clubs in the UEFA Champions League via live matches and highlights programmes. Scotsport's main rival was the long-running BBC Scotland strand Sportscene, which continues to broadcast to this day.

Prior to the 2007–08 season, Scotsport faced competition for viewers of its SPL coverage. On 18 July 2007, it was announced that the SPL had signed a similar deal with BBC Scotland for non-exclusive television coverage of the league. This did not affect Scotsport's production, although the programme lost ratings. Scotsport continued in its hour-long Monday night slot at 10.40pm for the remainder of the 2007–08 season, with Sportscene's SPL highlight airing later in the week on Wednesdays at 10pm on BBC Two Scotland.

On Hogmanay 2007, STV broadcast 50 Years of Scotsport, a programme taking a look back at the shows best moments over the 50 years it had been on air. Featuring colleagues from past and present, one of the show's most recent presenters, Grant Stott presented the Hogmanay special. A month before the anniversary programme aired, STV decided to axe Scotsport, after BBC Scotland won a five-year deal to show SPL highlights. The programme aired for the last time on Thursday 22 May 2008.

A smaller-scale sports magazine show, STV Sports Centre, was launched on Friday 5 March 2010 but it was axed fifteen months later.

== Presenters ==
Final hosts of Scotsport

Despite being one of the world's longest-running sports television programmes, there were only five main anchors in its 51 years on air, largely due to the 32-year tenure of Arthur Montford, who retired in May 1989. Montford was succeeded by Jim White, Jim Delahunt, and finally, the pairing of Grant Stott and Andy Walker, who also anchored STV's Champions League coverage.

Other key members of the Scotsport on-air team during its run included the likes of Bob Crampsey, Jock Brown, and Gerry McNee.

In 1982, Sally McNair joined the show and become the first female TV sports journalist in Scotland. Six years later, Hazel Irvine (who joined Scottish Television as a continuity announcer) became co-presenter of the Friday night preview show, Extra Time - she defected to the rival Sportscene programme in 1990.

A controversial revamp of the SPL highlights show in 2004 saw the arrival of Sarah O'Flaherty (known as Sarah O) and Julyan Sinclair, who co-anchored Scotsport SPL on Monday nights for two seasons.

In its latterday run, match commentators included Archie Macpherson, Jock Brown, Ian Crocker and Rob MacLean.

== Spin-off shows ==
- Scotsport Results launched on 7 September 1957 and was broadcast on Saturday teatimes at around 5pm during the football season. It was presented by Arthur Montford, and latterly, Jim White until the end of the 1992/93 football season in May 1993.
- World of Sport from Scotland (billed as Scotsport Special) was broadcast as a occasional opt out from the network version of World of Sport on Saturday afternoons throughout the 1960s, 1970s and 1980s, it was presented by Arthur Montford and largely featured live and highlights coverage of Scottish sporting events incorporated with the network sporting events.
- Junior Scotsport was a short-lived feature series for children, which aired on alternate Wednesday evenings from 8 July to 5 August 1959 (6.35–7.05pm).
- From 1979 to 1984, a short preview programme called Sport Extra aired on Friday evenings at 6.25pm, following Scotland Today.
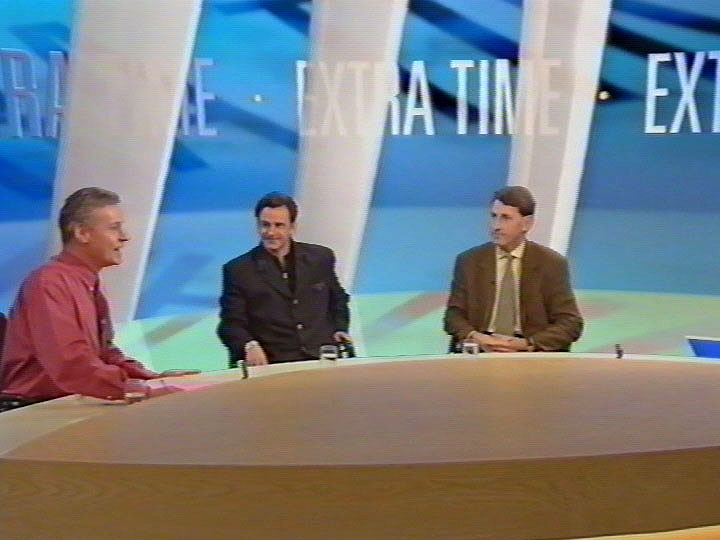
- Scotsport Extra Time 1994 virtual set [by Liquid Image]
  Between the 1988–89 and 1999–2000 seasons, Scotsport Extra Time (later renamed simply Extra Time from 8 January 1994) aired mostly on Friday nights starting on 28 October 1988 at 10.35pm lasting until 17 December 1993 moving to Saturday lunchtimes at 12:30pm from 8 January 1994 until 11 May 1996 and then moving to Friday nights at 7:00pm at the beginning of the new season on 10 August 1996 and featured previews of the weekend's fixtures, interviews and other sports including ice hockey, rugby, snooker and golf. Jim White presented the programme - alongside Hazel Irvine for the first two seasons - until his move to Sky in 1998 with his last programme on 10 May. Jim Delahunt took over with the programme starting with the final Friday night series on 31 July 1998 starting off at 6:00pm before moving back to its original timeslot of 7:00pm from 13 November, The last Friday night show was broadcast on 21 May 1999 before moving to Saturday lunchtime for the second time from 31 July 1999 until 9 December 2000. Grampian Television also aired the series from 2 January 1998 along with sister station Sky Scottish from launch on 1 November 1996 until 8 May 1998 three weeks before the station's closure.
- During the seasons when Scottish Television owned the rights to Scotland's premier rugby league, live matches and highlights were shown under the Scotsport Rugby Roundup banner commencing on 14 January 2001 continuing until 16 May 2004. Kathleen Wood, Jim Delahunt, Jim Hay and Richie Gray presented the programme.
- During the seasons where STV had the highlights rights for both the Scottish Premier League and the First Division, Scotsport was divided into two programmes. Scotsport First aired on Sunday mornings and retained a traditional highlights format, while Scotsport SPL, was revamped as a magazine show on Monday nights, featuring three presenters, a live studio audience and more emphasis on features over match highlights. The Monday night show was heavily criticised by viewers and latterly returned to a more traditional format for the 2006–7 season.
- Scotsport Fanzone aired during the latter half of the 2005–06 season on Thursday nights, taking in a forum format encouraging Scottish football fans to have their say on the week's news.
- Scotsport Rugby Sunday was a short-lived spin-off, specifically focused on rugby union in Scotland. Richie Gray presented the series, featuring news and highlights, including coverage of Edinburgh and Glasgow Warriors, lower league club rugby and women's games.
- STV Rugby, an hour-long Celtic League highlights show was launched in September 2009, and continued on and off until the end of the 2011–2012 season, marking the end of regular Scottish sports programming produced by STV.
