= 1972 in Wales =

- Centuries: 18th; 19th; 20th; 21st
- Decades: 1950s; 1960s; 1970s; 1980s; 1990s
- See also: List of years in Wales; Timeline of Welsh history 1972 in The United Kingdom Scotland Elsewhere

This article is about the particular significance of the year 1972 to Wales and its people.

== Incumbents ==
- Secretary of State for Wales – Peter Thomas
- Archbishop of Wales – Gwilym Williams, Bishop of Bangor
- Archdruid of the National Eisteddfod of Wales
  - Tilsli (outgoing)
  - Brinli (incoming)

== Events ==
- 1 January – Welsh rugby captain John Dawes is made an OBE in the New Year Honours List.
- 30 January – Opening to rail traffic of the new Britannia Bridge linking Anglesey with mainland Wales (following the destruction of the previous bridge by a fire).
- March/April – The "Miners' Tramway" underground at Llechwedd Slate Caverns, Blaenau Ffestiniog, opens to the public.
- 3 May – Leslie Harvey, guitarist of Stone the Crows, is fatally electrocuted while performing at Swansea's Top Rank Suite.
- 13 September – Hypermarkets make their debut in the United Kingdom some twenty years after debuting in France, when French retail giant Carrefour opens a hypermarket in Caerphilly.
- 26 October – Passage of the Local Government Act 1972, which will reorganise and simplify local government in Wales and Monmouthshire from 1974.
- 11 December – Rhoose Airport is opened by The Duke of Edinburgh.
- date unknown
  - Sir Morien Morgan becomes Master of Downing College, Cambridge.
  - The island of Flat Holm is designated a Site of Special Scientific Interest (SSSI).
  - The communities of Machynys and Bwlch y Gwynt cease to exist, following the closedown of local industry; the residents are moved into Llanelli.
  - Llyn Brianne regulating reservoir on the River Towy is completed; its dam is the UK's tallest, standing at a height of 300 ft (91 m).

== Arts and literature ==
- Writer James Morris becomes Jan Morris.

=== Awards ===
- National Eisteddfod of Wales (held in Haverfordwest)
- National Eisteddfod of Wales: Chair – Dafydd Owen, "Preselau"
- National Eisteddfod of Wales: Crown – Dafydd Rowlands, "Dadeni"
- National Eisteddfod of Wales: Prose Medal – Dafydd Rowlands, "Ysgrifau yr Hanner Bardd"
- National Eisteddfod of Wales: Drama Medal – Urien Wiliam

=== New books ===
==== English language ====
- Alexander Cordell – The Fire People
- A. H. Dodd – Life in Wales
- Emyr Humphreys – National Winner
- Richard Jones The Tower is Everywhere
- Roland Mathias – Absalom in the Tree
- Edith Pargeter – A Bloody Field By Shrewsbury
- Will Paynter – My Generation (autobiography)
- Goronwy Rees – A Chapter of Accidents
- Ifor Williams – The beginnings of Welsh poetry

==== Welsh language ====
- Marion Eames – Y Rhandir Mwyn
- Islwyn Ffowc Elis – Eira Mawr
- Bobi Jones – Allor Wydn
- David Tecwyn Lloyd – Lady Gwladys a Phobl Eraill
- Gerallt Lloyd Owen – Cerddi'r Cywilydd
- Kate Roberts – Gobaith a Storïau Eraill

== Drama ==
- Gwyn Thomas – Amser Dyn sef Darnau o Einioes

=== Music ===
- Badfinger – Straight Up (album)
- John Cale – The Academy in Peril (album)
- Dafydd Iwan – Yma Mae 'Nghân (album)
- Mary Hopkin – Live At The Royal Festival Hall (album)
- Tom Jones – Close Up (album)

== Film ==
- The film of Dylan Thomas's Under Milk Wood appears, with Richard Burton, Glynis Johns, Ryan Davies and many other Welsh stars.
- Hywel Bennett stars with Hayley Mills in Endless Night.

=== Welsh-language films ===
- The Song We Sing Is About Freedom

== Broadcasting ==
=== Welsh-language television ===
- Gwrando ar fy Nghan with singer Heather Jones
- Teliffant with Myfanwy Talog and Huw Ceredig
- Nol Mewn 5 Munud with Huw Ceredig

=== English-language television ===
- Kenneth Griffith's reputation is underlined with a four-part documentary series about the Boer War, Sons of the Blood.
- Anthony Hopkins wins acclaim for his first starring role on television in BBC2's adaptation of War and Peace.
- Glyn Houston appears as Bunter opposite Ian Carmichael as Lord Peter Wimsey, in the first of several TV serials based on the stories of Dorothy L. Sayers.

== Sport ==
- Chess – Wales competes in the World Chess Olympiad at Skopje, Yugoslavia.
- Cricket – Tony Lewis captains England on his Test debut in Delhi, India.
- Rugby union
  - 25 March – Derek Quinnell makes his debut for Wales against France.
  - 31 October – Llanelli RFC defeat the New Zealand All Blacks 9–3 at Stradey Park in front of 26,000 supporters.
- The Welsh Sports Association is established.
- BBC Wales Sports Personality of the Year – Richard Meade

== Births ==
- 27 January
  - Nathan Blake, footballer
  - Wynne Evans, tenor
- March - Helen Raynor, dramatist and screenwriter
- 23 March – Joe Calzaghe, boxer
- 10 April – Chris Corcoran, comedian
- 18 April – Mike Bubbins, stand-up comedian, writer, actor, presenter and podcaster
- 7 June – Sian Lloyd, television news presenter
- 5 July – Nia Roberts, actress
- 20 August – Scott Quinnell, rugby player
- 24 August – Jason Bowen, footballer
- 4 September – Guto Pryce, musician
- 23 September – Julian Winn, cyclist
- 3 October – Josie d'Arby, actress and television presenter
- 4 November – Tim Vincent, television presenter
- 27 December – Colin Charvis, rugby player

== Deaths ==
- 17 January – Stan Davies, footballer, 73
- 4 February – Sir Charles Robert Harington, chemist, 74
- 25 February – S. O. Davies, politician, 85
- 27 February – Will James, dual-code rugby player, 69
- 7 March – Jack Morley, Wales and British Lions rugby player, 62
- 10 March – Gwynfor Davies, cricketer, 63
- 20 March – Dudley Lloyd-Evans, First World War flying ace, 76 or 77
- 28 March – James Edward Nichols, geneticist, 69
- 10 April – Ormond Jones, footballer, 61
- 28 May – The Duke of Windsor, Prince of Wales 1910–1936), 77
- 14 June (at Goathurst) – Glyn Simon, Archbishop of Wales (1968–71), 69
- 9 July – Sir Henry Morris-Jones, doctor, soldier and politician, 87
- 10 July – Emrys Jones, actor, 56 (heart attack)
- 12 August – Reg Anderson, cricketer, 58
- 28 September – Tom Roberts, Wales international rugby union player, 75?
- 19 October
  - David Hughes, opera singer, 47 (heart failure)
  - Fred Keenor, footballer, 78
- 6 November – Hilary Marquand, economist and MP, 70
- 13 November – Glyn Prosser, dual-code rugby player, 64
- 30 November – Frank Evans, dual-code international rugby player, 75
- 4 December – Lynn Ungoed-Thomas, politician and judge, 68
- unknown date
  - Sam Davies, Wales international footballer, 77 or 78
  - Lillian Griffith, sculptor, 94 or 95

== See also ==
- 1972 in Northern Ireland
