= 1969 in Wales =

- Centuries: 18th; 19th; 20th; 21st
- Decades: 1940s; 1950s; 1960s; 1970s; 1980s
- See also: List of years in Wales; Timeline of Welsh history 1969 in The United Kingdom Scotland Elsewhere

This article is about the particular significance of the year 1969 to Wales and its people.

== Incumbents ==
- Secretary of State for Wales – George Thomas
- Archbishop of Wales – Glyn Simon, Bishop of Llandaff
- Archdruid of the National Eisteddfod of Wales
  - E. Gwyndaf Evans (outgoing)
  - Tilsli (incoming)

== Events ==
- 1 April – Registration of births and deaths in the Welsh language is allowed for the first time.
- May – Deep mining of slate at Oakeley Quarry, Blaenau Ffestiniog, ceases.
- 22 May – Engineer Morien Morgan becomes Director of the Royal Aircraft Establishment at Farnborough, Hampshire, having been knighted in the New Year Honours.
- 1 June – The South Wales Constabulary is created by merging the police forces of Glamorgan, Cardiff, Swansea and Merthyr Tydfil.
- 11 June – The Prince of Wales' (now Charles III) new standard is flown for the first time.
- 20 June – Llandudno Cable Car opened, the longest gondola lift system in the UK.
- 30 June – Two members of the Mudiad Amddiffyn Cymru (Movement for the Defence of Wales) are killed whilst placing a bomb outside government offices in Abergele in an attempt to disrupt the following day's events.
- 1 July
  - The Prince of Wales (now Charles III) is invested with his title at Caernarfon Castle.
  - Six members of the Free Wales Army are convicted in Swansea of public order and firearms offences; three are imprisoned.
- 3 July – Swansea is granted city status.
- 25 July – The Development of Tourism Act 1969 paves the way for creation of the Wales Tourist Board.
- 22 August – Closure of Dinorwic slate quarry.
- November – Clashes between police and anti-apartheid protesters occur when the touring South African rugby team play Swansea. A silent protest takes place at an Ebbw Vale match.
- December – Serious damage at Lluest-wen Reservoir requires emergency evacuation and repairs.

== Arts and literature ==
- Dafydd Iwan co-founds Sain Recordiau Cyf, which would become the major Welsh-language record label.

=== Awards ===
- National Eisteddfod of Wales (held in Flint)
- National Eisteddfod of Wales: Chair – James Nicholas
- National Eisteddfod of Wales: Crown – Dafydd Rowlands
- National Eisteddfod of Wales: Prose Medal – Emyr Jones

=== New books ===
- Glyn Mills Ashton – Angau yn y Crochan
- Pennar Davies – Meibion Darogan
- Rhys Davies – Print of a Hare's Foot
- T. Glynne Davies – Hedydd yn yr Haul
- R. F. Delderfield – Come Home, Charlie, and Face Them
- Raymond Garlick – A Sense of Europe
- Glyn Jones – The Dragon Has Two Tongues
- T. J. Morgan – Dydd y Farn Ac Ysgrifau Eraill
- Dennis Selby – Sanctity: or There's No Such Thing as a Naked Sailor
- John Griffith Williams – Pigau'r Sêr

== Drama ==
- Urien Wiliam – Cawl Cennin

== Poetry ==
- John Fitzgerald – Cadwyn Cenedl
- D. Gwenallt Jones – Y Coed
- Gwilym R. Jones – Cerddi
- John Ormond – Requiem and Celebration
- Penguin Book of Welsh Verse

=== Music ===
==== Albums ====
- Amen Corner – Explosive Company (album)
- Blonde on Blonde – Contrasts (album)
- Man – 2 Ozs of Plastic with a Hole in the Middle

==== Singles ====
- Huw Jones – Dŵr ("Water") (protest song)

==== Classical music ====
- Jeffrey Lewis – Mutations I
- Mansel Thomas – Mini-Variations on a Welsh Theme
- David Wynne – Cymric Rhapsody no. 2

== Film ==
=== English-language films ===
- Richard Burton stars in Anne of the Thousand Days.
- Hywel Bennett stars in The Virgin Soldiers.

== Broadcasting ==
- Cymdeithas yr Iaith Gymraeg (the Welsh Language Society) publishes a pamphlet entitled Broadcasting in Wales: To Enrich or Destroy Our National Life?

=== English-language television ===
- Philip Madoc has roles in Manhunt!, The Avengers, Randall and Hopkirk (Deceased), The Champions and The Detective, among others.

=== Welsh-language television ===
- Miri Mawr (children's)

== Sport ==
- BBC Wales Sports Personality of the Year – Tony Lewis
- Cricket – Glamorgan win the County Championship.
- Rugby union – Wales win the Five Nations Championship and take the Triple Crown.
- football – Cardiff City win the Welsh Cup.

== Births ==
- 6 January – Nicholas A'Hern, race walker
- 20 January – Nicky Wire, musician
- 5 February – Michael Sheen, actor
- 10 February – Francesca Rhydderch, novelist and academic
- 13 February – Gareth Abraham, footballer
- 21 February – James Dean Bradfield, musician
- 24 February – Gareth Llewellyn, rugby player
- 1 March – Dafydd Ieuan, musician
- 11 April – Cerys Matthews, singer
- 4 June – Julie Gardner, television producer
- 26 July – Tanni Grey-Thompson, born Carys Grey, wheelchair athlete
- 4 August – Tony Roberts, footballer
- 4 September – Sasha, DJ and record producer
- 8 September – Gary Speed, footballer and national manager (died 2011)
- 25 September – Catherine Zeta-Jones, actress
- 8 October – David Abruzzese, footballer
- 23 October – Chris Fry, footballer
- 6 December – Anthony Davies, snooker player
- date unknown – Dyfed Wyn-Evans, operatic baritone

== Deaths ==
- 20 January – Roy Evans, footballer, 25 (car crash)
- 3 February – Trevor Thomas, dual-code rugby player, 61
- 14 February – Ernest Roberts, judge, 78
- 10 March – Jimmy Wilde, boxer, 76
- 18 March – Llewellyn Alston, Royal Welch Fusiliers, 78
- 20 March – Arthur E. Powell, Theosophist writer, 86
- 26 March (in Australia) – Elizabeth Williams Berry, jockey of Welsh parentage, 114
- 27 March – David Lloyd, tenor, 56
- 31 March – Percy Jones, Wales international rugby player, 82
- 5 April – Mal Griffiths, footballer, 50
- 15 April
  - John Davies, dual code rugby player, 28 (heart attack)
  - Cowboy Morgan Evans, Texan rodeo rider of Welsh descent, 66
- 20 April – Watkin Roberts, missionary, 82
- 4 May – Albert Stock, Wales international rugby player, 72
- 7 May – Stan Awbery, trade unionist and politician, 80
- 21 May – Ben Beynon, Welsh rugby union international and Swansea Town player, 75
- 23 May – Sir Evan Owen Williams, English-born Welsh engineer, 79
- 28 May – Rhys Williams, actor, 71
- 7 July – William David Davies, theologian, 72
- 26 July – Noel Hopkins, clergyman and organist, 77
- 12 August – Air Commodore James Bevan Bowen, RAF officer, 86
- 19 August – Percy Thomas, architect, 85
- 1 October – Dai Richards, footballer, 62
- 5 October – Sir Edward John Davies, judge in colonial service, 71
- 15 October – Charlie Phillips, footballer, 59
- 18 October – Emrys Hughes, politician, 75
- 11 November – Robert Thomas Jenkins, historian, 88
- 21 November – D. B. Wyndham-Lewis, author, 78
- 7 December
  - Bill Roberts, Wales international rugby union player, 60
  - (in London) Hugh Williams, dramatist, 65
- 20 December – Eleanor Evans, actress, singer and director, 76

== See also ==
- 1969 in Northern Ireland
