= 1970 in Wales =

- Centuries: 18th; 19th; 20th; 21st
- Decades: 1950s; 1960s; 1970s; 1980s; 1990s
- See also: List of years in Wales; Timeline of Welsh history 1970 in The United Kingdom Scotland Elsewhere

This article is about the particular significance of the year 1970 to Wales and its people.

== Incumbents ==
- Secretary of State for Wales – George Thomas (until 20 June); Peter Thomas
- Archbishop of Wales – Glyn Simon, Bishop of Llandaff
- Archdruid of the National Eisteddfod of Wales – Tilsli

== Events ==
- 11 January – The last trolleybuses run on the Cardiff trolleybus system, the last such system in Wales.
- 23 May – The 120-year-old Britannia Bridge built by Robert Stephenson across the Menai Strait is destroyed by fire.
- 2 June – During the construction of the Cleddau Bridge, a cantilever collapses, resulting in the deaths of four workers. It is the last major bridge disaster in the UK.
- 18 June – In the UK General Election:
  - S. O. Davies, having resigned from the Labour Party, retains his Parliamentary seat of Merthyr Tydfil, standing as an Independent Labour candidate.
  - Gwynfor Evans loses his seat at Carmarthen.
  - Jim Griffiths retires as MP for Llanelli, to be replaced by Denzil Davies.
  - Nigel Birch retires from the House of Commons, to be created Baron Rhyl.
- 25 October – Pope Paul VI canonizes the Forty Martyrs of England and Wales, who include the priests Philip Evans and John Lloyd, John Jones, David Lewis, John Roberts, and the teacher Richard Gwyn.
- Dr Phil Williams becomes the first Chairman of Plaid Cymru.

== Arts and literature ==
- Robert Plant and Jimmy Page retreat to Bron-Yr-Aur to write songs for Led Zeppelin III.

=== Awards ===
- Bernice Rubens wins the Booker Prize for The Elected Member.
- National Eisteddfod of Wales (held in Ammanford)
- National Eisteddfod of Wales: Chair – Tomi Evans, "Y Twrch Trwyth"
- National Eisteddfod of Wales: Crown – Bryan Martin Davies, "Darluniau ar Gynfas"
- National Eisteddfod of Wales: Prose Medal – withheld

=== New books ===
==== English language ====
- Ron Berry – So Long, Hector Bebb
- Tom Earley – The Sad Mountain
- Menna Gallie – You're Welcome to Ulster!
- Sally Roberts Jones – Turning Away
- John Ormond – Requiem and Celebration
- Harri Webb – The Green Desert

==== Welsh language ====
- Marion Eames – Y Stafell Ddirgel
- J. Gwyn Griffiths – Cerddi Cairo
- John Robert Jones – Ac Onide
- R. Williams Parry – Yr Haf a Cherddi Eraill
- Gwynne Williams – Rhwng Gewyn ac Asgwrn
- T. Wilson Evans – Iwan Tudur

=== Music ===
- Badfinger – No Dice (featuring the original recording of "Without You")
- John Cale – Vintage Violence
- Meic Stevens – Outlander
- Shakin' Stevens and the Sunsets – A Legend

== Film ==
- Stanley Baker stars in The Games.
- Hugh Griffith appears in Start the Revolution Without Me.

=== Welsh-language films ===
- None

== Broadcasting ==
- 6 April – HTV starts broadcasting in colour from the Wenvoe transmitting station and from this day becomes known on air as HTV rather than Harlech Television.
- Coverage of the Llangollen International Eisteddfod is the first colour programme to be made by BBC Wales.

=== Welsh-language television ===
- Fo a Fe makes a star of Ryan Davies, who goes on to make three series of Ryan a Ronnie in Welsh with his partner Ronnie Williams.
- Cadi' Ha (children's programme)
- Mr. Lolipop, M. A.

== Sport ==
- Boxing – Eddie Avoth wins the Commonwealth lightweight title.
- Show Jumping – David Broome wins the individual Show Jumping World Championship.
- Snooker – Ray Reardon wins the World Professional Snooker Championship for the first time.
- David Broome wins BBC Wales Sports Personality of the Year.

== Births ==
- 1 January – Brian Law, footballer
- 7 March – Cameron Toshack, footballer
- 19 March – Tracey Hinton, athlete
- 2 April – Jason Perry, footballer
- 15 April – Rebecca John, television presenter
- 19 May – Stuart Cable, rock musician and television presenter (died 2010)
- 25 May – Robert Croft, cricketer
- 18 June – Lucy Owen, television presenter
- 22 June – Paul Davies, snooker player
- 18 July – Gruff Rhys, rock musician
- 27 July (in England) – David Davies, politician
- 30 July – Alun Cairns, politician
- 9 August – Lee Jones, football goalkeeper
- 19 August – Me One (Eric Martin), singer-songwriter and rapper
- 26 September – Kevin Lloyd, footballer
- October – Helen Stokes-Lampard, chair of the Royal College of General Practitioners
- 11 October (in England) – Andy Marriott, goalkeeper
- 14 November – Derwyn Jones, rugby union player
- 27 November – Stephen Evans, actor and comedy writer
- 29 December – Aled Jones, singer and radio presenter
- 31 December – Louise Rickard, rugby union player

== Deaths ==
- 3 January – Trefor Morgan, financier, 55
- 4 January – David John Williams (D. J. Williams), author and Plaid Cymru politician, 84
- 9 January – Caleb Rees, teacher and writer, 86
- 23 January – Ifan ab Owen Edwards, founder of the Urdd, 74
- 26 January – Albert Evans-Jones (Cynan), poet, 74
- 2 February – Bertrand Russell, philosopher, 97
- 16 February – Bil Perry, Wales international rugby player, 83
- 22 February – Roddy Hughes, actor, 78
- 18 March – Hubert Rhys, cricketer, 72
- 20 April – Thomas Iorwerth Ellis, academic, 70
- 29 April – Bryn Evans, Welsh rugby international, 68
- 7 May
  - Annie Davies, radio and TV producer, 59
  - Jack Jones, novelist, 75
- 30 May – John Edward Jones, Plaid Cymru leader, 64
- 3 June – John Robert Jones, philosophy professor, 58
- 4 June – Daniel John Davies, Independent minister and poet, 84
- 9 June – Billy Spiller, cricketer and rugby player, 83
- 18 June – D. Winton Thomas, Hebrew scholar, 69
- 6 July – Richard Roberts, Archdeacon of St Asaph, 86
- 10 July – Isaac Griffiths, politician in Canada, 78
- 3 August – Sir Lincoln Evans, trade unionist, 80
- 4 August
  - Alun Ogwen Williams, teacher and Eisteddfod administrator, 65
  - Morgan Williams, politician in New Zealand
- 26 August – Thomas Mardy Jones, miner and politician, 91
- 10 October – Owen Picton Davies, journalist, 88
- 8 November – Huw T. Edwards, trade union leader and politician, 77
- 17 November – Naunton Wayne, actor, 69

== See also ==
- 1970 in Northern Ireland
