= 1971 in Wales =

- Centuries: 18th; 19th; 20th; 21st
- Decades: 1950s; 1960s; 1970s; 1980s; 1990s
- See also: List of years in Wales; Timeline of Welsh history 1971 in The United Kingdom Scotland Elsewhere

This article is about the particular significance of the year 1971 to Wales and its people.

== Incumbents ==
- Secretary of State for Wales – Peter Thomas
- Archbishop of Wales
  - Glyn Simon, Bishop of Llandaff (retired)
  - Gwilym Williams, Bishop of Bangor (elected)
- Archdruid of the National Eisteddfod of Wales – Tilsli

== Events ==
- February - Harold Charles becomes Bishop of St Asaph.
- 6 May - Singer Dickie Valentine is killed in a car accident on the Glangrwyney bridge near Crickhowell.
- 28 May - Opening of the Llanberis Lake Railway.
- 1 August - It becomes legal to register marriages in the Welsh language.
- date unknown
  - The Welsh Nursery Schools Movement is founded in Aberystwyth.
  - Anglesey Aluminium opens its smelting plant on the outskirts of Holyhead.
  - Wylfa Nuclear Power Station becomes operational.

== Arts and literature ==
- Mary Hopkin marries record producer Tony Visconti.
- Welsh performers participate in the first Festival Interceltique de Lorient in Brittany.

=== Awards ===
- National Eisteddfod of Wales (held in Bangor)
- National Eisteddfod of Wales: Chair - Emrys Roberts, "Y Chwarelwr"
- National Eisteddfod of Wales: Crown - Bryan Martin Davies, "Y Golau Caeth"
- National Eisteddfod of Wales: Prose Medal - Ifor Wyn Williams

=== New books ===
==== English language ====
- Rhys Davies - Nobody Answered the Bell
- John L. Hughes - Tom Jones Slept Here

==== Welsh language ====
- Islwyn Ffowc Elis - Y Gromlech yn yr Haidd
- Gwynfor Evans - Aros Mae
- Tudor Wilson Evans - Ar Gae'r Brêc
- Beti Hughes - Aderyn o Ddyfed
- Alan Llwyd - Y March Hud
- Eluned Phillips - Cofiant Dewi Emrys
- Gwyn Thomas - Y Bardd Cwsg a'i Gefndir

=== Music ===
- John Cale & Terry Riley - Church of Anthrax
- Man - Do You Like It Here Now, Are You Settling In?
- Iris Williams - Pererin Wyf (single)

== Film ==
- Merthyr Tydfil is one of the locations used for the filming of 10 Rillington Place.
- Ruth Madoc appears in the film version of Fiddler on the Roof.

=== Welsh-language films ===
- None

== Broadcasting ==
=== Welsh-language television ===
- Max Boyce appears on the Welsh-language music show, Disc a Dawn.

=== English-language television ===
- Comedy duo Ryan Davies and Ronnie Williams transfer their successful Welsh language show to BBC1.
- 22 March - Sesame Street's UK debut is on HTV.
- 14 April - Nerys Hughes gets her big break in The Liver Birds, first aired on this date.

== Sport ==
- BBC Wales Sports Personality of the Year - John Dawes, Wales national rugby union teen and Welsh Lions
- Cricket - May: In a Glamorgan home match at Sophia Gardens, Roger Davis is struck on the temple while fielding at short leg and survives largely thanks to the intervention of Dr Colin Lewis (grandfather of Rhydian Roberts).
- Gymnastics - Pam Hopkins wins the British Women's Championship.
- Rugby union - Wales win their sixth Grand Slam.
- Sailing - Nicolette Milnes-Walker becomes the first woman to sail non-stop single-handed across the Atlantic.

== Births ==
- 11 January - Tom Ward, actor
- 16 January - Damian Walford Davies and Jason Walford Davies (twins), academics and poets
- 23 January - Scott Gibbs, rugby player
- 19 March (in Taunton) - Kirsty Williams, politician
- 2 April - Chico Slimani, singer
- 18 June - Lucy Owen, née Cohen, television news presenter
- 8 July - Neil Jenkins, rugby player
- 18 August (in Limerick) - Aphex Twin, musician
- 8 September - Martyn Margetson, footballer
- 3 October - Zoe Lyons, comedian
- 26 October - Damon Searle, footballer
- 5 November
  - Chris Addison, Cardiff-born comedian
  - Rob Jones, footballer
- 18 December - Jason Hughes, actor
- date unknown
  - Eleri Siôn, née Jones, media presenter

== Deaths ==
- 2 January – Harold Jones, convicted murderer, 64
- 12 January – Gwenan Jones, historian and politician, 81
- 4 March – Ifan Gruffydd ("Y Gŵr o Baradwys"), author, 75
- 8 March – Harold Lloyd, American comedy actor of Welsh descent, 77
- 18 March – Jack Gore, Wales international rugby player, 71
- 9 April – Dewi Morgan, poet, scholar and journalist, 93
- 19 April – Thomas Evan Nicholas (Niclas y Glais), writer and political activist, 91
- 18 May – William Mainwaring MP, miners' leader
- 20 May – Waldo Williams, poet, 66
- 29 May – Howell Lewis, Wales international rugby player, 83
- 5 June – Clifford Dyment, poet, 57
- 5 July – Idris Jones, chemist and rugby player, 71
- 11 July – Brenda Chamberlain, poet and artist, 59
- 4 September – C. E. Vulliamy, author, 85
- 1 October – Bill Davies, cricketer, 65
- 9 November - Ceri Richards, artist, 68
- 27 November - Leslie Thomas, politician, 65
- 1 December - Jack Jenkins, Wales international rugby player, 91
- date unknown
  - James Conway Davies, historian and palaeographer, 79
  - Jack Evans, footballer

== See also ==
- 1971 in Northern Ireland
