= 1974 in Wales =

- Centuries: 18th; 19th; 20th; 21st
- Decades: 1950s; 1960s; 1970s; 1980s; 1990s
- See also: List of years in Wales; Timeline of Welsh history 1974 in The United Kingdom England Scotland Elsewhere

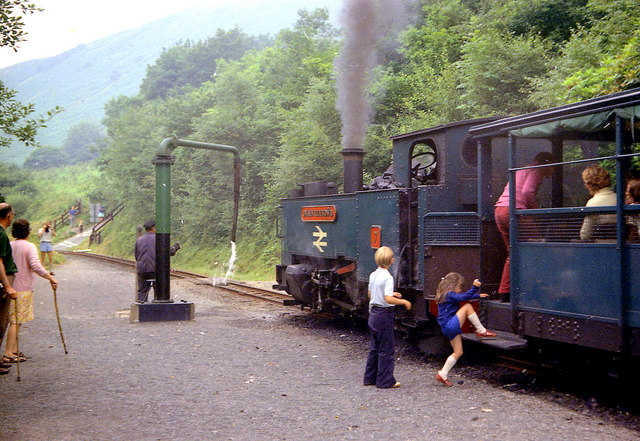
Steam locomotive No. 7, Owain Glyndwr, at Aberffrwd Station on the Vale of Rheidol Railway in 1974.

This article is about the particular significance of the year 1974 to Wales and its people.

== Incumbents ==
- Secretary of State for Wales – Peter Thomas (until 5 March); John Morris
- Archbishop of Wales – Gwilym Williams, Bishop of Bangor
- Archdruid of the National Eisteddfod of Wales – Brinli

== Events ==
- 23 January – A UFO appears to crash in a remote area of North Wales. This becomes known as the Berwyn Mountain Incident.
- 28 February – In the first United Kingdom general election of 1974, Geraint Howells wins Ceredigion for the Liberals, while Gwynfor Evans fails to retain Carmarthen for Plaid Cymru by three votes.
- 5 March – Elwyn Jones is appointed Lord Chancellor in Harold Wilson’s government.
- 1 April – The Local Government Act 1972 comes into effect, abolishing all 13 traditional counties of Wales and creating eight new counties, also confirming that Monmouthshire (mostly incorporated in the new county of Gwent) is part of Wales.
- 10 October – In the second United Kingdom general election of 1974, Gwynfor Evans regains his seat at Carmarthen.
- 22 November – Helen Morgan becomes Miss World; she is forced to resign after four days when it is discovered that she is an unmarried mother.
- Tredegar House is bought by Newport Council.
- Laura Ashley opens stores in Paris and San Francisco.

== Arts and literature ==
- Kyffin Williams is elected to the Royal Academy.
- Andrew Vicari is appointed official painter to the Saudi royal family.
- The Cory Brass Band is the first Welsh band to win the British National Championship.
- The BBC Welsh Symphony Orchestra achieves full symphony status.
- Foundation of the Welsh Jazz Society.
- Journalist Hugh Cudlipp is created Baron Cudlipp of Aldingbourne.
- Glyn Daniel becomes Professor of Archaeology at Cambridge.

=== Awards ===
- National Eisteddfod of Wales (held in Carmarthen)
- National Eisteddfod of Wales: Chair - Moses Glyn Jones
- National Eisteddfod of Wales: Crown - William George
- National Eisteddfod of Wales: Prose Medal - Dafydd Ifans

=== English language ===
- Tony Conran - Spirit Level
- Gwynfor Evans - Land of my Fathers
- Jan Morris - Conundrum
- Leslie Norris - Mountains, Polecats, Pheasants
- John Ormond - Definition of a Waterfall
- Goronwy Rees - Brief Encounters
- Alun Richards - Dai Country
- Harri Webb - A Crown for Branwen

=== Welsh language ===
- Islwyn Ffowc Elis - Marwydos
- David Jenkins - T. Gwynn Jones: Cofiant
- Bobi Jones - Tafod y Llenor
- John G. Williams - Maes Mihangel

=== Music ===
- Andy Fairweather-Low - Spider Jiving (album)
- Alun Hoddinott - The Beach of Falesá (opera)
- Mike Oldfield - Hergest Ridge (album)

== Film ==
- Richard Burton stars in The Klansman.

=== Welsh-language films ===
- None

== Broadcasting ==
- 30 September - Independent radio station Swansea Sound comes into operation.

=== Welsh-language television ===
- 8 October - Pobol y Cwm appears for the first time.

=== English-language television ===
- Richard Burton is banned from BBC productions after complaints about his derogatory comments about Winston Churchill and others in power during World War II.
- Windsor Davies makes his first appearance as Sergeant Major Williams in It Ain't Half Hot Mum.

== Sport ==
- Curling – The Welsh Curling Association is formed.
- Golf – Brian Huggett wins the Portuguese Open.
- Snooker – Ray Reardon wins his third World Championship title.
- Gareth Edwards wins BBC Wales Sports Personality of the Year.

== Births ==
- 5 January – Iwan Thomas, athlete
- 30 January – Christian Bale, actor
- 15 March (in Zambia) – Vaughan Gething, politician, First Minister
- 3 May – Barry Jones, boxer
- 11 May – Darren Ward, footballer
- 29 May – Jenny Willott, politician
- 3 June – Kelly Jones, rock singer-songwriter-guitarist
- 25 June – David Park, golfer
- 11 August – Dafydd Trystan Davies, chair of Plaid Cymru
- 1 September – Tony Bird, footballer
- 3 September – Rob Page, footballer
- 5 September – Becky Morgan, golfer
- 13 September – Andy Gorman, footballer
- 20 September (in Suva, Fiji) – Owen Sheers, poet and actor
- 17 October – Beverley Jones, athlete
- 18 October – Robbie Savage, footballer
- 24 October – David Evans, squash player
- 8 November – Matthew Rhys, actor
- 12 November – Jonathan Morgan, politician
- date unknown – Bedwyr Williams, installation and performance artist

== Deaths ==
- 9 January – Dora Herbert Jones, singer and administrator, 83
- 11 January – Joe Jones, dual-code rugby player, 57
- 21 January – Sandy Griffiths, football referee, 65
- 11 February – D. Jacob Davies, Unitarian minister, broadcaster, writer and journalist, 57
- 12 February – Alec Harris, spiritualist medium, 76
- 3 April
  - David Davies, actor)
  - Desmond Donnelly, politician, 53 (suicide)
- 16 April – Cecil Spiller, cricketer, 73
- 5 April – Trefor Evans, diplomat, 61
- 14 April – Sir Archibald Lush, schools inspector, 74
- 13 May – Islwyn Evans, Wales international rugby player, 75
- 11 June – William Jones, dean of Brecon, 76
- 29 August (in Oxford) – Harold Arthur Harris, academic, 71
- 9 September – Neil McBride, MP for Swansea East, 64
- 28 October (in Harrow) – David Jones, poet and artist, 78
- November – Bessie Jones singer, 87
- 14 November - Gomer Hughes, rugby player, 64
- 24 November - Ivor Jones, footballer, 75
- 29 December – William Charles Fuller, Victoria Cross recipient, 80

== See also ==
- 1974 in Northern Ireland
