= 1973 in Wales =

- Centuries: 18th; 19th; 20th; 21st
- Decades: 1950s; 1960s; 1970s; 1980s; 1990s
- See also: List of years in Wales; Timeline of Welsh history 1973 in The United Kingdom Scotland Elsewhere

This article is about the particular significance of the year 1973 to Wales and its people.

== Incumbents ==
- Secretary of State for Wales – Peter Thomas
- Archbishop of Wales – Gwilym Williams, Bishop of Bangor
- Archdruid of the National Eisteddfod of Wales – Brinli

== Events ==
- 10 February - A special conference of the Trades Union Congress is held at Llandrindod Wells as part of the campaign to establish a Wales TUC.
- April - Elections take place to the new county councils of Wales
- April – The first Welsh-language papur bro community newspaper, Y Dinesydd, is founded.
- 10 May – Elections take place to the new Wales district councils, with big gains for the Labour Party in South Wales.
- May – Sony opens its factory in Bridgend, the first major Japanese investment in Wales.
- 15 May – The Llyn Brianne dam is officially opened by Princess Alexandra.
- 17 July – Sixteen-year-old Sandra Newton is found murdered at Tonmawr.
- 16 September – Sixteen-year-olds Geraldine Hughes and Pauline Floyd are found murdered at Llandarcy. Their murders, along with that of Sandra Newton in July, will remain unsolved for 29 years.
- 23 October – Professor Brian Josephson wins the Nobel Prize for Physics.
- During the year, there are 424 road deaths in Wales – an all-time record.
- Drilling for oil and gas begins off the coast of Wales. A fourth oil refinery opens at Milford Haven.

== Arts and literature ==
- The Welsh Philharmonia Orchestra is founded.
- Theatr Ardudwy at Coleg Harlech, designed by Colwyn Foulkes & Partners, opens.
- Sir Richard Armstrong becomes conductor of Welsh National Opera.
- Joe Strummer begins his studies at Newport College of Art.
- Welsh actress Angharad Rees marries Christopher Cazenove.

=== Awards ===
- National Eisteddfod of Wales (held in Ruthin)
- National Eisteddfod of Wales: Chair – Alan Llwyd
- National Eisteddfod of Wales: Crown – Alan Llwyd
- National Eisteddfod of Wales: Prose Medal – Emyr Roberts
- National Eisteddfod of Wales: Drama Medal – Urien Wiliam

=== New books ===
==== English language ====
- Leo Abse – Private Member
- Gwynfor Evans – Wales Can Win
- Richard Hughes – The Wooden Shepherdess
- Emlyn Williams – Emlyn

==== Welsh language ====
- Huw Lloyd Edwards – Y Llyffantod
- Jane Edwards – Tyfu
- W. J. Gruffydd (Elerydd) – Cerddi'r Llygad
- Moses Glyn Jones – Y Ffynnon Fyw
- T. Llew Jones - Barti Ddu
- Judith Maro - Atgofion Haganah
- Caradog Prichard - Afal Drwg Adda
- Gomer M. Roberts - Cloc y Capel

=== New drama ===
- Islwyn Ffowc Elis - Harris

=== Music ===
- 23 November - Max Boyce records his legendary Live at Treorchy show at Treorchy Rugby Club.
- Karl Jenkins' first album with Soft Machine, Six, wins the Melody Maker British Jazz Album of the Year award. Jenkins also wins the miscellaneous musical instrument award.
- Grace Williams – Ave Maris Stella and Fairest of Stars

=== Visual arts ===
- Ivor Roberts-Jones – Statue of Winston Churchill, Parliament Square, unveiled on 1 November by Lady Churchill.

== Film ==
=== Welsh-language films ===
- None

=== English-language films ===
- Holiday on the Buses filmed on location at Pontins holiday camp, Prestatyn

== Broadcasting ==
- The Labour Party publishes a study arguing that independent television arrangements in the UK are causing non Welsh-speaking residents to lose their Welsh identity.

=== Welsh-language television ===
- Youth music programme Disc a Dawn ends its six-year run, to be replaced the following year by Gwerin 74, a folk music show.
- Strim, Stram Strellach with Marged Esli.

=== English-language television ===
- Fish (with John Ogwen)
- Hang out your Brightest Colours, controversial documentary by Kenneth Griffith
- Philip Madoc makes a memorable appearance as a U-boat captain in Dad's Army.

== Sport ==
- Athletics – Cardiff Amateur Athletic Club wins the British Athletics League Championship for the second time.
- Cycling – The Welsh Cycling Union is formed.
- Horse racing – Geoff Lewis wins both the Epsom Oaks and the 1,000 Guineas on "Mysterious".
- Rugby union – Japan plays its first rugby match in Europe at Penygraig in the Rhondda Valley.
- Snooker – Ray Reardon wins his second World Championship title.
- Berwyn Price wins BBC Wales Sports Personality of the Year.

== Births ==
- 20 January – Stephen Crabb, politician (born in Scotland)
- 15 February - Adrian Lewis Morgan, actor
- 27 February - Mark Taylor, rugby union player and manager
- 24 April - Gabby Logan, television presenter
- 3 May - Jamie Baulch, athlete (born in Nottingham)
- 10 May – Ryan Nicholls, footballer
- 29 May – Lee Jones, footballer
- 4 July – Bradley Dredge, golfer
- 6 August – Donna Lewis, singer
- 22 August – Lee Dainton, skateboarder
- 17 September – Jason Mohammad, radio and television sports presenter
- 6 October – Ioan Gruffudd, actor
- 9 October – Sian Evans, singer
- 3 November – Mark Evans, comedy scriptwriter
- 29 November – Ryan Giggs, footballer
- 25 December – Ewen MacIntosh, comic actor (died 2024)

== Deaths ==
- 8 January – Sir David Hughes Parry, professor of law and university administrator, 80
- 11 January – Vernon Morris, cricketer, 78
- 30 January – Trystan Edwards, architectural critic, town planner and amateur cartographer, 88
- 12 March – Willie Llewellyn, Wales international rugby player, 94
- 19 March – Sir Clement Price Thomas, surgeon, 79
- 23 May – Kenneth Allott, poet and critic
- 29 July – Guy Morgan, rugby player, 65
- 9 August – Donald Peers, singer, 66
- 11 August
  - Johnnie Clay, Test cricketer, 75
  - Gil Morgan, rugby league player, 65
- 17 August – Elena Puw Morgan, novelist, 73
- 21 September – C. H. Dodd, theologian, 89
- 8 October – Evan Tom Davies, mathematician, 69
- 3 November – Melville Richards, academic, 63
- 4 November – Billy Williams, dual-code international rugby player, 67
- 16 November – Dai Hiddlestone, Wales international rugby player, 83
- 24 November – Brigadier Hugh Llewellyn Glyn Hughes, soldier and medical administrator, 81
- 28 November – Anne Griffith-Jones, educationist, 83 (in Malaysia)
- date unknown - Morris Meredith Williams, painter and illustrator

== See also ==
- 1973 in Northern Ireland
