= 1968 in Wales =

- Centuries: 18th; 19th; 20th; 21st
- Decades: 1940s; 1950s; 1960s; 1970s; 1980s
- See also: List of years in Wales; Timeline of Welsh history 1968 in The United Kingdom Scotland Elsewhere

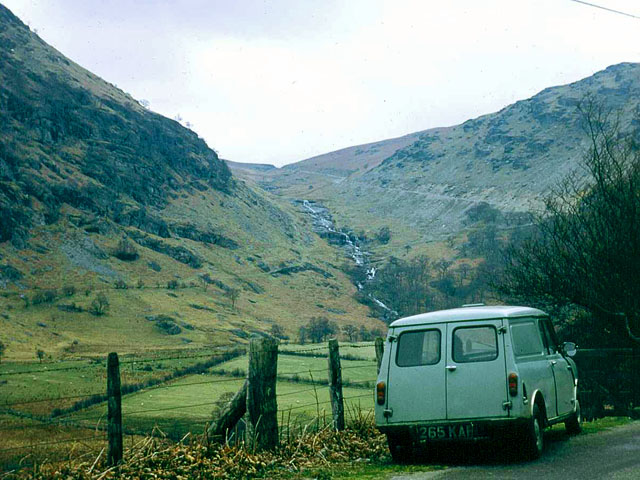

This article is about the particular significance of the year 1968 to Wales and its people.

== Incumbents ==
- Secretary of State for Wales – Cledwyn Hughes (until 5 April); George Thomas (from 6 April)
- Archbishop of Wales – Glyn Simon, Bishop of Llandaff
- Archdruid of the National Eisteddfod of Wales – E. Gwyndaf Evans

== Events ==
- 9 May – County borough and district elections take place, with the Labour Party losing its majority on Newport Borough Council after 16 years.
- 10 August – Gulf Oil's new refinery at Milford Haven is officially opened by Queen Elizabeth II of the United Kingdom.
- September – In response to the news that Harold Wilson's government has proposed to use part of the disaster fund set up to help the people of Aberfan to meet the costs of removing the tip that caused the Aberfan disaster, Merthyr MP S. O. Davies says: "I have never known a prime minister to behave so disgracefully in all my 34 years in the House of Commons".
- October – Trawsfynydd nuclear power station, the only nuclear power station to be located in a national park, is opened.
- November – In the referendum on the Sunday opening of public houses, the counties of Anglesey, Caernarfon, Cardigan, Carmarthen and Merioneth vote to stay "dry".
- 17 December – Official opening of first phase of the Royal Mint's new Llantrisant plant.
- The Welsh Office acquires responsibility for historic monuments, and for the water supply in Wales.
- The first bilingual (Welsh/English) postage stamp is issued, in recognition of the Prince of Wales's forthcoming investiture.
- Hugh Cudlipp becomes Chairman of the International Publishing Corporation.

== Arts and literature ==
- Welsh National Opera acquires a professional chorus.
- Cefn Cwrt Farm, Llangrannog, is purchased for use by the Urdd Gobaith Cymru.
- The Drama Tent is introduced to the Eisteddfod field.
- Cwmni Theatr Cymru is formed in Bangor.
- Actress Rachel Thomas is awarded the OBE for services to Wales.
- Teenager Mary Hopkin rises to stardom after her appearance on Opportunity Knocks.
- In His Own Write, by John Lennon, makes its stage debut at Britain's National Theatre in a version co-authored by and directed by Victor Spinetti.

=== Awards ===
- National Eisteddfod of Wales (held in Barry)
- National Eisteddfod of Wales: Chair – Bryn Williams, "Awdl Foliant i'r Morwr"
- National Eisteddfod of Wales: Crown – Haydn Lewis, "Meini"
- National Eisteddfod of Wales: Prose Medal – Eigra Lewis Roberts, Y Drych Creulon

=== New books ===
==== English language ====
- Menna Gallie – Travels with a Duchess
- Glyn Jones – The Dragon Has Two Tongues
- A. J. R. Russell-Wood – Fidalgos and Philanthropists: The Santa Casa da Misericórdia of Bahia, 1550–1755
- Gwyn Thomas – A Few Selected Exits

==== Welsh language ====
- Irma Chilton – Cusanau
- Pennar Davies – Meibion Darogan
- Islwyn Ffowc Elis – Y Blaned Dirion
- Urien Wiliam – Dirgelwch y rocedi

==== Drama ====
- Ewart Alexander – Omri's Burning

=== Music ===
- "Delilah", "Help Yourself" and "Love Me Tonight" are hits for Tom Jones.
- "Bend Me, Shape Me" and "High in the Sky" are hits for Amen Corner.
- Badfinger sign for the Beatles' Apple label.

== Film ==
- 8 April–31 May – Filming of Carry On Up the Khyber with location scenes in Snowdonia.
- Richard Burton and Donald Houston appear in Where Eagles Dare.
- Anthony Hopkins makes his first big-screen impact in The Lion in Winter, appearing alongside Timothy Dalton.
- Hywel Bennett stars in Twisted Nerve.
- Harry Secombe appears in Oliver!.
- Timothy Dalton turns down the role of James Bond, feeling that he is too young for the part.

== Broadcasting ==
- 20 May – Harlech Television takes over the commercial television franchise from TWW. Wynford Vaughan-Thomas, one of the founders of the new company, becomes Director of Programmes.

=== Welsh-language TV and radio ===
- Helo Sut Dach Chi?, presented by Hywel Gwynfryn, is the first Welsh-language pop programme on radio.

== Sport ==
- BBC Wales Sports Personality of the Year – Martyn Woodroffe
- Boxing – Howard Winstone wins the World Featherweight title.
- Cricket – August 31: During a match between Glamorgan and Nottinghamshire at Swansea, Gary Sobers hits six sixes off one over bowled by Malcolm Nash.
- Football – Cardiff City reach the semi-finals of the European Cup Winners Cup, losing to Hamburg.
- 1968 Summer Olympics
  - Richard Meade wins a gold medal as part of the British equestrian team in the Team Three-Day Event.
  - David Broome takes a bronze in the Individual Show Jumping Grand Prix.
  - Martyn Woodroffe is the only British swimmer to win a medal – a silver in the men's 200 m butterfly.
- Rugby union – Jeff Young makes his international debut against Scotland.

== Births ==
- 3 March – Trevor Rees-Jones, bodyguard to Diana, Princess of Wales (in Germany)
- 28 March – Jon Lee, rock drummer (d. 2002)
- May – Rakie Ayola, actress
- 14 May – Greg Davies, comedian
- 28 May – Kylie Minogue, actress and singer (in Melbourne, of maternal Welsh origin)
- 29 May – Jessica Morden, politician
- 1 June – Susan Jones, Welsh politician
- 13 June – David Gray, folk-rock singer-songwriter
- 22 July – Rhys Ifans, actor
- 26 June – Iwan Roberts, footballer
- 27 July – Carl Sargeant, politician (suicide 2017)
- 30 July – Sean Moore, rock percussionist
- 19 August – Roger Freestone, footballer
- 22 September – Robert Buckland, politician, Solicitor General for England and Wales
- 23 September – Adam Price, politician
- 12 October – Mark Donovan, actor
- 18 October – Rhod Gilbert, comedian
- 28 November – Andrew RT Davies, politician
- 13 December – Steve Robinson, featherweight boxer
- December – Abi Morgan, screenwriter

== Deaths ==
- 13 January – William Williams (Crwys), poet and Archdruid, 93
- 25 January – Louie Myfanwy Thomas (Jane Ann Jones), novelist, 59
- 6 February – Gomer Berry, 1st Viscount Kemsley, 84, in Monaco
- 3 May – Ness Edwards, politician, 71
- 16 July – William Evans (Wil Ifan), poet, 85
- 24 August – Bailey Davies, Wales international rugby union player, 83
- 28 August – Arthur Henderson, Baron Rowley, politician, 75
- 4 September – Arthur Horner, politician, 74
- 10 November – Tommy Rees, Wales dual-code rugby player, 64
- 17 November – Carey Morris, artist, 86
- 20 November – David Grenfell, politician, 87
- 24 December – D. Gwenallt Jones, poet, 69
- date unknown
  - Dafydd Jones (Isfoel), poet
  - Manfri Wood, last known speaker of the Welsh-Romani language

== See also ==
- 1968 in Northern Ireland
