= Abruzzese =

Abruzzese may refer to:

- Neapolitan language, Abruzzese Orientale Adriatico and Abruzzese Occidentale dialects from the Abruzzo region
- Abruzzo region of Italy: Abruzzese is the associated adjective

== Animal breeds ==
- The Cane da pastore Maremmano-Abruzzese, sometimes called Cane da pastore Abruzzese or Maremma Sheepdog
- Abruzzese cattle

== People ==
- Abruzzese (surname)

== See also ==
- Abbruzzi
- Abruzzi (disambiguation)
