= Wythnos yng Nghymru Fydd =

1957 novel by Islwyn Ffowc Elis

First edition

Wythnos yng Nghymru Fydd (A Week in the Wales of the Future, literally A week in the Wales that will be) is a science fiction novel in the Welsh language written by Islwyn Ffowc Elis and published by Plaid Cymru in 1957.

Set in the 1950s, the narrator Ifan Powel takes part in a time travel experiment and lands in Cardiff in the year 2033. He is hosted by a family and for 5 days is taken on a journey around Wales. He finds that Wales has secured self-government and is prosperous economically, and socially harmonious; everyone is bilingual in both Welsh and English. He falls in love with the daughter of his host family, Mair, and when he returns to Wales in the 1950s his longing for her makes him want to return to 2033. The scientist conducting the experiment cautions him against this as the future is not set and Ifan may therefore encounter a very different future if he travels again (see Rules of Time Travel), but after Ifan begs for his help he agrees to send Ifan back.

However, when Ifan returns he finds a totally different Wales. In this dystopian future, the Welsh language has died out and traces of Welsh identity have all but disappeared. Indeed, even the country's name has been changed to "Western England". Violence and social tensions are also commonplace. Ifan only stays here for two days in order to look for Mair, but when he finds her he discovers that her name in this future is Maria, and she has no memory of him.

After returning to the present for the second time, the scientist explains to Ifan that both scenarios that Ifan encountered are possible for Wales and that it is up to the Welsh people which one comes to pass. This converts Ifan into a Welsh nationalist (he had previously been opposed to nationalism) and he swears to do everything within his power to ensure that the Wales that he visited first is the one that will be realised.

In the 2012 version of the novel, Dylan Iorwerth (co-founder of the Welsh language magazine Golwg) describes the novel as propaganda. Citing from Elis' biography, Iorweth claims that Gwynfor Evans, the Plaid Cymru president at the time, had the opportunity to sensor parts of the novel that would undermine the case for an independent Wales.

The novel is significant in the history of Welsh-language literature in that it was the first major science fiction work for adults to be written in the Welsh language, but it has been argued that the fact that it is (on the author's own admission) a blatant work of political propaganda diminishes its literary value to an extent.

In 2017 Gareth Glyn composed an opera based on the novel with the libretto by Mererid Hopwood.

In 2019 the novel was translated into English by Stephen Morris. An attempt to crowdfund the publication of the book in hard copy format was unsuccessful. However, the translation was published by Cambria Futura in March 2021.

== Bibliography ==
Wythnos yng Nghymru Fydd has been the subject of various critical appraisals:

- Schimanski, Johan (1995). "Wythnos yng Nghymru Fydd - unwaith eto" [A week in future Wales - once again]. Taliesin (88): 24–30.
  - published in English as "The Future on Repeat". Skriftserie for Litteraturvitenskap Ved Universitetet I Oslo (14): 40–48. 1995.
- Schimanski, Johan (1997). "Hen Wraig y Bala". Barn 414/415: 72-3.
- Schimanski, Johan (2000). "Singing 'Che Gelida Manina' In Welsh: Internal and External Cultural. Translation In the Future Wales of Islwyn Ffowc Elis". Interlitteraria 5: 365-74.
- Davies, Grahame (Winter 2005). "Beginnings: New Media and the Welsh Language" (PDF). North American Journal of Welsh Studies. 5 (1). North American Association for the Study of Welsh Culture and History.
- Crockett, Kate (1996). "Cenedl! Cenedl!: Kate Crockett ar ddystopia". Tu Chwith 6: 70-77.
- Jones, Craig Owen (2008–2009). "'Magnifique, n'est-ce pas?': Representations of Wales and the world in Islwyn Ffowc Elis's Wythnos Yng Nghymru Fydd". Almanac: Welsh Writing in English. 13. Parthian.
- Evans, Gareth Llyr (2017). "Ymlaen Mae Canaan: Dyfodoldeb yn Hanesyddiaeth y Theatr Gymraeg". Perfformio'r Genedl: Ar Drywydd Hywel Teifi Edwards. Caerdydd: Gwasg Prifysgol Cymru. tt. 1–30. ISBN 978-1-78683-034-0
- Pak, Chris (2023). "Chris Pak, ‘Visions of the Future, Farming and Land Use in Welsh Science Fiction’, Revista Helice, 33 (2023), 48-65.". Revista Helice 33: 48-65
- Jones, Miriam Elin (2025). "'Dim Newydd Dan Haul'?: Y tensiynau rhwng traddodiad a newydd-deb yn ffuglen wyddonol Islwyn Ffowc Elis.". Gweddnewidiadau: Ysgrifau Beirniadol XXXV. Talybont: Y Lolfa. tt. 67–99. ISBN 978-1-80099-628-1
