= Tudur Dylan Jones =

Welsh poet (born 1965)

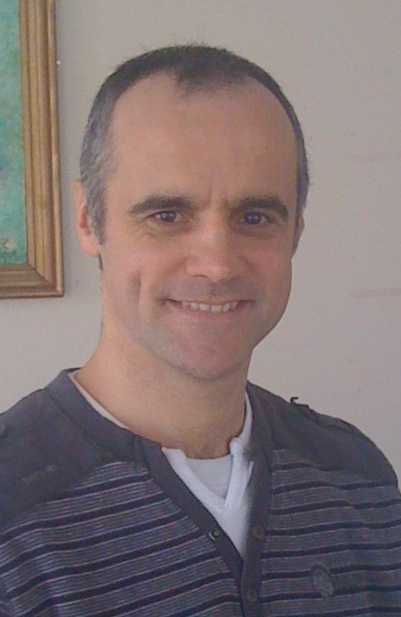
- Born: February 1965 (age 61); Carmarthen, Wales
- Occupations: Poet and teacher
- Title: Archdderwydd-elect of the National Eisteddfod of Wales
- Partner: Rhian
- Children: 2
- Father: John Gwilym Jones
- Relatives: T. James Jones (uncle)

Tudur Dylan Jones (born 30 June 1965), often known simply as Tudur Dylan, is a Welsh-language poet who will become the Archdruid of the National Eisteddfod of Wales in 2028, following his election as successor to Mererid Hopwood.

He was the winner of the Crown at the 2007 National Eisteddfod of Wales in Flintshire and has twice been the winner of the Chair: at the 1995 National Eisteddfod of Wales at Colwyn Bay (where his father was the officiating Archdruid) and the 2005 Eisteddfod at Eryri.

== Early life and education ==
He was born in Carmarthen, the son of the Welsh-language writer Rev. John Gwilym Jones, but was brought up in Bangor, Wales, where he attended Ysgol y Garnedd and Ysgol Tryfan. Both his father and his uncle, T. James Jones, have held the position of Archdruid in years past. Tudur Dylan went on to graduate in Welsh and Education at Bangor University.

== Career ==
Jones taught Welsh at Ysgol y Strade, Llanelli, retiring in 2019.

Jones is a minister at Cwmdyfran Calvinistic Methodist Chapel in Carmarthenshire, where he preaches in Welsh.

=== Poetry ===
In 1988, he won the Chair at the Urdd National Eisteddfod, open to competitors under 26. In 2004-2005, he was the Children's Poet Laureate for the Urdd.

He has been a judge in the poetry competitions at the National Eisteddfod and at other eisteddfodau. His publications have included volumes of poetry and books for children.

=== Musical theatre ===
In 2005, Jones translated the libretto of Les Miserables into Welsh. In 2015, he wrote the lyrics for Mimosa, a musical based on Welsh settlers in Patagonia. The musical held performances in both Welsh and English.
