= Reg Anderson =

Reg Anderson may refer to:

- Reg Anderson (cricketer) (1914–1972), Welsh cricketer
- Reg Anderson (footballer) (1916–1942), English footballer
