= Ifans =

Ifans is a Welsh surname. Notable people with the surname include:

- Dafydd Ifans (born 1949), Welsh novelist and translator
- Llŷr Ifans (born 1968), Welsh actor
- Rhiannon Ifans (born 1954), Welsh academic and writer
- Rhys Ifans (born 1967), Welsh actor, producer, and musician
