= Manon Rhys =

Welsh businesswoman and philanthropist

- Born: 26 April 1948 (age 78)
- Education: Ysgol Glan Clwyd
- Occupations: Poet, novelist, scriptwriter
- Known for: National Eisteddfod of Wales
- Spouse: T. James Jones

Manon Rhys (born 26 April 1948) is a Welsh novelist, editor and TV scriptwriter. She was born in the Rhondda, the daughter of the writer James Kitchener Davies. She was the winner of the National Eisteddfod Crown in 2015, for her poem "Breuddwyd"., having won the Prose Medal in 2011, for her novel Neb Ond Ni.

She is one of the scriptwriters of the long-running Welsh-language TV soap opera Pobol Y Cwm.

Manon Rhys was educated at Ysgol Gynradd Gymraeg Ynyswen in Treorchy, and later in Porth Girls' Grammar School. She completed her secondary education in Ysgol Glan Clwyd, Rhyl, where her mother, Mair Davies, was head of the Welsh department. She subsequently taught Creative Writing Tutor at the School of Welsh in Cardiff. After divorcing her first husband she married poet, and former Archdruid, T. James Jones.

== Books ==
- Cwtsho (short stories; Gwasg Gomer, 1988)
- Ar fy Myw (ed.) (Honno, 1990)
- O Na Byddai'n Haf o Hyd (adaptation of Goodbye Summer by Alison Prince) (Gwasg Gomer, 1990)
- Cysgodion (1993)
- Tridiau, ac Angladd Cocrotshen (Gwasg Gomer, 1996)
- Y Palmant Aur 1: Siglo'r Crud (Gwasg Gomer, 1998)
- Y Palmant Aur 2: Rhannu'r Gwely (Gwasg Gomer, 1999)
- Y Palmant Aur 3: Cwilt Rhacs (1999)
- Storïau'r Troad (ed.) (Gwasg Gomer, 2000)
- James Kitchener Davies: Detholiad o’i Waith (co-editor with M. Wynn Thomas) (University of Wales Press, 2002)
- Rara Avis (Gwasg Gomer, 2005)
- Cerddi'r Cymoedd (ed.) (Gwasg Gomer, 2005)
- Cornel Aur (Gwasg Gomer, 2009)
- Neb Ond Ni (Gwasg Gomer, 2011)
- Ad astra (Gwasg Gomer, 2013)
- Stafell fy Haul (Barddas, 2018)
