= Gwyn Davies =

Gwyn Davies may refer to:

- Gwyn Davies (cricketer)
- Gwyn Davies (rugby)
- Gwyn Davies (Arrowverse)

== See also ==
- Gwynfor Davies
