= Mererid Hopwood =

Welsh poet, born 1964

Mererid Hopwood FLSW
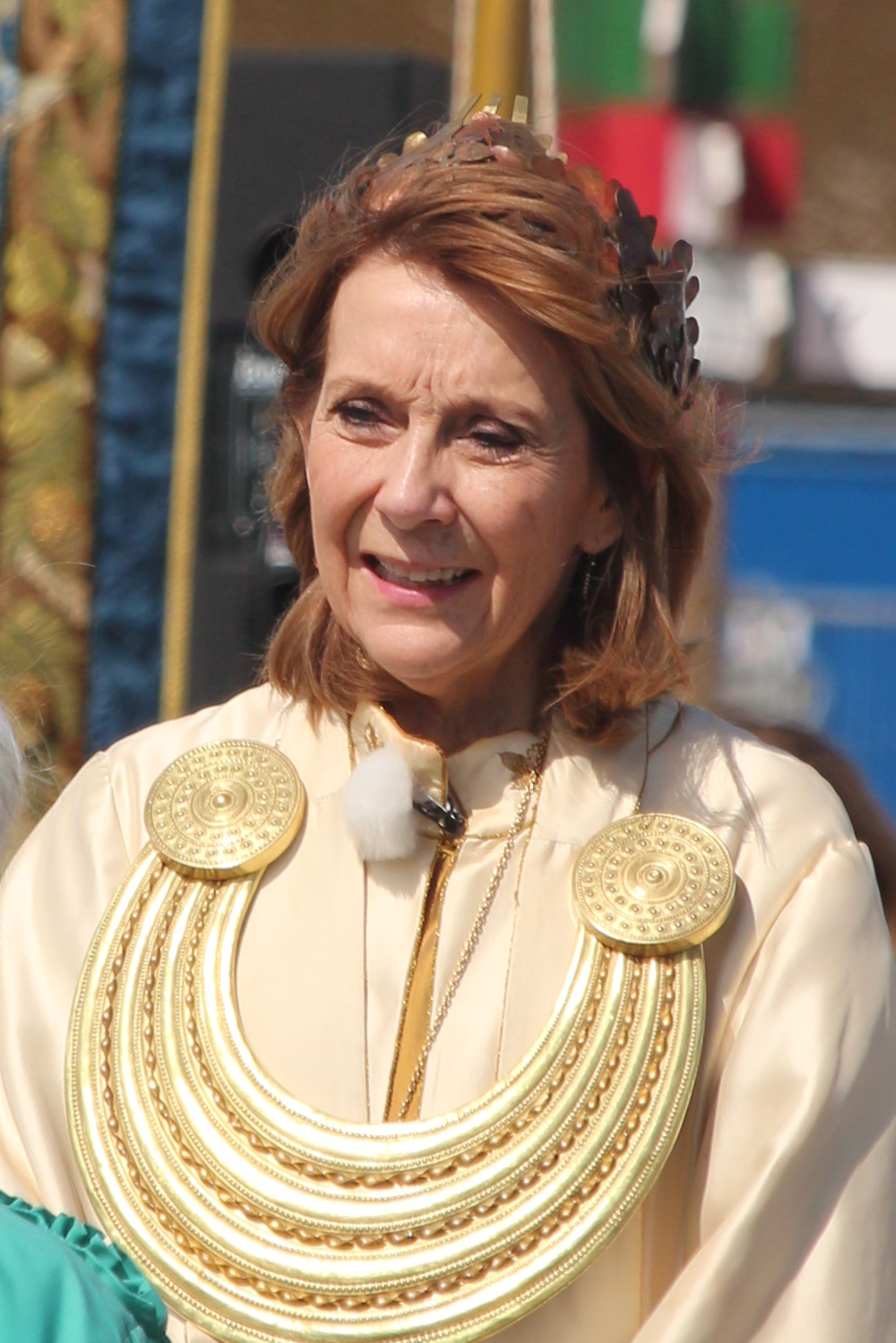
- Hopwood as Archdderwydd at the 2026 National Eisteddfod of Wales, Llantood, Pembrokeshire
- Born: February 1964 (age 62); Cardiff, Wales
- Occupations: Writer, bard, television presenter and academic
- Title: Archdderwydd of the National Eisteddfod of Wales
- Children: 3

Mererid Hopwood (born February 1964) is a Welsh poet and lyricist, currently serving as Archdruid of the National Eisteddfod of Wales.

== Teaching ==
Originally from Cardiff, Hopwood graduated in Spanish and German from the University of Wales, Aberystwyth. She was a lecturer in German at the University of Wales, Swansea, and since 2001 has also been a creative writing tutor in the Welsh Department. She was a Spanish teacher at Ysgol Gyfun Gymraeg Bro Myrddin in Carmarthenshire until January 2010, and is currently a lecturer at University of Wales Trinity Saint David.

Hopwood was appointed in January 2021 as chair of Welsh and Celtic Studies at Aberystwyth University.

== Eisteddfodau ==
She became the first woman in Eisteddfod history to be awarded the Chair at the National Eisteddfod in 2001 which was held in Denbigh. In 2003, she won the Crown at the National Eisteddfod in Meifod, and in 2008, the Eisteddfod's Prose Medal for her book O Ran. She is also an S4C presenter. In 2012, she was awarded the Glyndwr Award by MOMA, Machynlleth.

In August 2009, Hopwood was put forward for the position of Archdruid of the National Eisteddfod, following the death of Dic Jones. It was the first time a woman had been nominated. In November, she decided to withdraw from the contest, leaving T. James Jones to fill the vacancy.

In 2023, Hopwood was elected Archdruid for the period from 2024 to 2027; she is the second woman to hold the post, after Christine James.

In June 2024 she spoke at a rally in favour of Welsh Independence in Carmarthen. A long-standing peace campaigner, she has openly opposed government plans to build a radar installation near St Davids.

During the 2026 Pembrokeshire National Eisteddfod, an election was held to decide who would succeed Archdruid Mererid when her term ends in 2027, and Tudur Dylan Jones emerged as the winner.

== Honours ==
In 2018, Hopwood was elected as a Fellow of the Learned Society of Wales.

In 2026, Hopwood won Wales Book of the Year for her volume of poetry, Mae.

== Works ==
- Sarah Kirsch (1997), study of the poet Sarah Kirsch
- Singing in Chains: Listening to Welsh Verse (2004)
- Seren Lowri (2005)
- Plentyn (2005)
- Ar Bwys (2007)
- O Ran (2008)
- Nes Draw (2015)
- Cantata Memoria (libretto) to music by Karl Jenkins (2016)
- Wythnos yng Nghymru Fydd (libretto) to the opera by Gareth Glyn (2017)
- Mae (2025)

Preceded by Myrddin ap Dafydd	Archdderwydd of the National Eisteddfod of Wales; 2024–2027	Succeeded by Tudur Dylan Jones
