= Abruzzese (surname) =

Abruzzese (pronounced [abrutˈtseːze, -eːse]) is an Italian surname, meaning literally "Abruzzian" or "from Abruzzo". Notable people with the surname include:

- David Abruzzese (born 1969), Welsh footballer
- Giuseppe Abruzzese (born 1981), Italian footballer
- Ray Abruzzese (1937–2011), American football player
- Nick Abruzzese (born 1999), American ice hockey player.

People with a similar surname include:

- Dave Abbruzzese (born 1968), American drummer
- Roberto Abrussezze (born 1948), Brazilian football manager and former player.
