= Lleifior =

Lleifior is the name of a fictional farm in two Welsh language novels by Islwyn Ffowc Elis.

The novels are both set in the 1950s: Cysgod y Cryman ("Shadow of the Sickle") and Yn ôl i Leifior ("Back to Lleifior").

Cysgod y Cryman, first published in 1953, follows the Vaughan family dynasty in post war rural Powys. It has also been issued in a Welsh learners' edition, published in 1987 by Gwasg Gomer and three times reprinted. In 1999, it was chosen as the most significant Welsh language book of the 20th century. It has had at least 17 impressions.

It was also one of the first Welsh-language books to be recorded as an audio book for the blind. This was done by the North Wales Society of the Blind in the early 1960s.

Both books have been best-sellers in Wales and have been translated into English.

== Notable adaptations ==
Cysgod y Cryman was brought to the stage and television screen. BBC Cymru commissioned an adaptation in the 1960s before S4C commissioned two series in the 1990s which followed the characters forty years later.

The first stage production was in 2007 by Theatr Genedlaethol Cymru adapted by Sion Eirian. It received great public success, but not so critically. It played to full theatres in Wales and on 5 April 2007 in the Bloomsbury Theatre in London, directed by Cefin Roberts.
