= 1974 in Scottish television =

This is a list of events in Scottish television from 1974.

== Events ==
=== February ===
- 28 February – Television coverage of the February general election.

=== April ===
- 20 April – Tenth anniversary of BBC Two Scotland.

=== June ===
- 24 June – BBC One Scotland broadcasts summer holiday children's programming opt out schedules for the first time. The summer holiday children's schedule (seen across the BBC network for the final three weeks between mid-late August) is time-shifted to air throughout the first three weeks of the holidays to viewers in Scotland due to school holiday differences across the UK.

=== September ===
- 23 September – Ceefax teletext transmissions begin.

=== October ===
- 10 October – Television coverage of the October general election.

=== December ===
- 12 December – Official opening of STV's new studios by Princess Alexandra. The original home of STV, the Theatre Royal, are sold to Scottish Opera for conversion as Scotland’s first opera house.

== Television series ==
- Scotsport (1957–2008)
- Reporting Scotland (1968–1983; 1984–present)
- Top Club (1971–1998)
- Scotland Today (1972–2009)
- Sutherland's Law (1973–1976)

== Births ==
- 15 January - Edith Bowman, music critic, radio and television presenter
- 30 October - Kerry McGregor, singer-songwriter and actress (died 2012)
- Unknown - Nick Ede, television presenter

== Deaths ==
- 29 May - James MacTaggart, 46, television producer

== See also ==
- 1974 in Scotland
