= Abruzzi (disambiguation) =

Abruzzi, a region of southern Italy.

Abruzzi may also refer to:

== Places ==
- Abruzzi Glacier in northern Pakistan
- Abruzzi Ridge, Mount Saint Elias, Canada
- Abruzzi Spur, K2, Pakistan
- Abruzzi e Molise, the formerly combined region of Abruzzo and Molise

== Other uses ==
- Duke of Abruzzi's Free-tailed Bat
- Luigi Amedeo, Duke of the Abruzzi (1873–1933), member of the Italian royal family and noted explorer
- John Abruzzi, a fictional character from the 2005 series Prison Break
- Panoz Abruzzi, a 2011 American sports car

== See also ==
- Abbruzzi, an alternate spelling of the surname
