= Sioned Wiliam =

Welsh comedy producer and executive

- Born: 1962 (age 63–64); Barry, Vale of Glamorgan, Wales
- Occupations: Producer, executive
- Spouse: Ian Brown
- Children: 1
- Father: Urien Wiliam

Sioned Wiliam (born 1962) is a Welsh comedy producer and executive. A former controller of comedy for ITV, she became the commissioning editor of comedy for BBC Radio 4 and Radio 4 Extra in March 2015 and served in the post for seven years.. In 2024, she was interim Chief Executive of Welsh-language TV station, S4C before embarking on a career writing novels in the Welsh language.

== Life and career ==
Sioned Wiliam is the daughter of Welsh-language writer Urien Wiliam. Raised in Barry, South Wales, she attended a Welsh-speaking comprehensive, Ysgol Gyfun Rhydfelen, before reading drama at Aberystwyth University and subsequently studying at Jesus College, Oxford. While at Oxford University, she began performing in the Oxford Revue, working with Rebecca Front and Armando Iannucci, among others. With Front, she was part of the comedy and music duo, the Bobo Girls; the two women performed as this act at the Edinburgh Festival Fringe in 1989 and in a radio series, Girls Will Be Girls, which ran for two series broadcast in 1989 and 1991.

Wiliam joined the BBC Radio's Light Entertainment department in 1988, but left in 1991 to produce the live television show Tonight With Jonathan Ross broadcast by Channel 4, remaining with the programme for a year. Subsequently, she joined the independent production companies Talkback, the company founded by Mel Smith and Griff Rhys-Jones, and Hat Trick. With Geoffrey Perkins, she produced Game On for Hat Trick.

Wiliam was appointed the controller of comedy for ITV in June 1999. During this period, Wiliam revived the single-comedy film on ITV, according to Wiliam, in the tradition of earlier projects developed from scripts by Jack Rosenthal and Alan Bennett. Wiliam also admitted in September 2005 to being interested in developing sitcoms, a declining format, especially on ITV1. She left her post at ITV in January 2006 following decisions made by Simon Shaps, director of television, about management restructuring. Wiliam then became a freelance independent producer.

Wiliam rejoined the BBC in March 2015 to commission Radio 4's comedy output and works for the network on three days each week. She partially replaced Caroline Raphael (whose remit had also included fiction) who had left the BBC. An announcement she was standing down from this role during 2022 was made in January. Julia McKenzie was announced as her replacement in April.

== Personal life ==
Wiliam is married to Ian Brown, known for his scripts for the My Family sitcom; the couple have a son. Her first novel Dal i Fynd (written in Welsh) was published in 2013.

== Publications ==
- Dal i Fynd (2013)
- Chwynnu (2017)
- Cicio'r Bar (2018)
- Y Gwyliau (2023)
