= 1974 in Scotland =

- Centuries: 18th; 19th; 20th; 21st
- Decades: 1950s; 1960s; 1970s; 1980s; 1990s
- See also: List of years in Scotland; Timeline of Scottish history 1974 in: The UK • England • Wales • Elsewhere; Scottish football: 1973–74 • 1974–75; 1974 in Scottish television

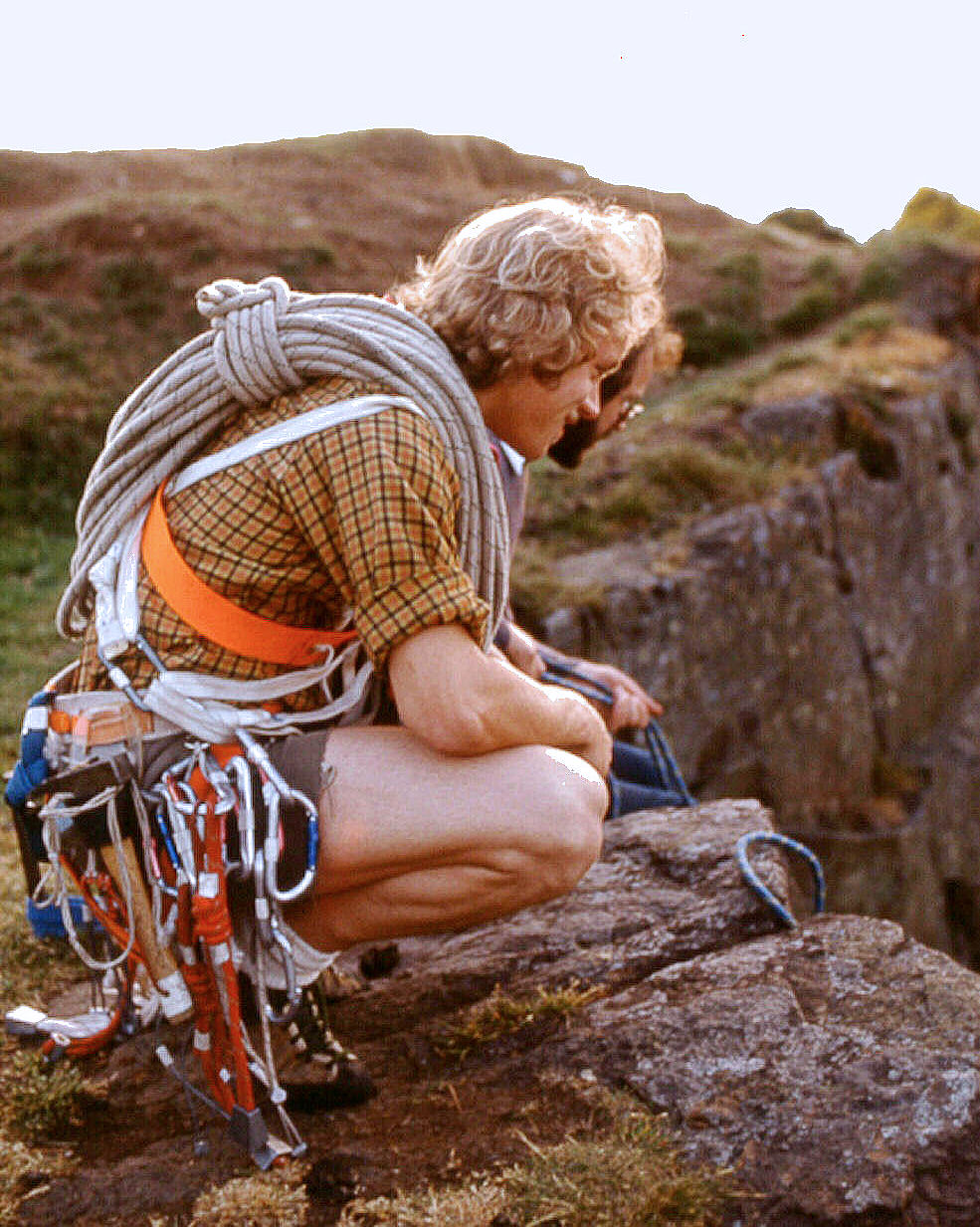
Two people in Scotland, 1974

Events from the year 1974 in Scotland.

== Incumbents ==
- Secretary of State for Scotland and Keeper of the Great Seal – Gordon Campbell until 4 March; then Willie Ross

=== Law officers ===
- Lord Advocate – Norman Wylie; then Ronald King Murray
- Solicitor General for Scotland – William Stewart until March; then John McCluskey

=== Judiciary ===
- Lord President of the Court of Session and Lord Justice General – Lord Emslie
- Lord Justice Clerk – Lord Wheatley
- Chairman of the Scottish Land Court – Lord Birsay

== Events ==
- 27 January – MV Captayannis capsizes in the Firth of Clyde.
- 31 January – Ninewells Hospital at Dundee admits its first patients.
- 28 February – The February general election results in the first hung parliament in the UK since 1929, though Labour does win a majority of seats in Scotland. The Scottish National Party make a breakthrough winning 7 MPs.
- March
  - Brora Coalfield is abandoned.
  - Last permanent inhabitants of Swona leave.
- 6 May – Inauguration of full electric service on British Rail's West Coast Main Line through to Glasgow Central railway station.
- 10 October – The second general election of the year results in a narrow victory for Prime Minister Harold Wilson, giving Labour a slim majority of three seats. Labour also wins a majority of seats in Scotland for a second time in the year; whilst the Scottish National Party secures its highest-ever Westminster representation up to this date with 11 seats. It would be 41 years before the SNP would not only beat their own record result; but also replace Labour as the largest political party in Scotland.
- 31 December – Idi Amin, President of Uganda, issues a proclamation in support of Scottish independence.
- Calum MacLeod (of Raasay) completes a 10-year self-imposed task of personally constructing "Calum's Road", a nearly 2 mile (3 km) track at the north end of the island.
- Last permanent inhabitants of Taransay leave.

== Births ==
- 15 January – Edith Bowman, DJ
- 17 January – Danny Bhoy, born Danni Chaudhry, comedian
- 9 August – Lesley McKenna, snowboarder
- 23 August – Ray Park, actor
- 20 October – Limmy, born Brian Limond, comedian and social media personality
- 30 October – Kerry McGregor, singer-songwriter and actress
- 9 December – Fiona MacDonald, curler
- 31 December – Kathryn Joseph, born Kathryn Sawers, singer-songwriter

== Deaths ==
- 24 January – Andrew Dewar Gibb, lawyer and Scottish National Party politician (born 1888)
- 29 May – James MacTaggart, television producer (born 1928)

== The arts ==
- 6 June – a television version of The Cheviot, the Stag, and the Black Black Oil is broadcast by the BBC as part of the Play for Today series.

== See also ==
- 1974 in Northern Ireland
