= 1974 in England =

- Centuries: 18th; 19th; 20th; 21st
- Decades: 1950s; 1960s; 1970s; 1980s; 1990s
- See also: 1973–74 in English football 1974–75 in English football 1974 in the United Kingdom; Other events of 1974

Events from 1974 in England

== Incumbent ==
- Monarch - Elizabeth II
- Prime Minister - Edward Heath (until 4 March), Harold Wilson (from 4 March)

== Events ==
- 1 January–7 March – The Three-Day Week is introduced by the Conservative Government as a measure to conserve electricity during the period of industrial action by coal miners.

=== February ===
- 4 February – Eleven people are killed in the M62 coach bombing; on 8 February the toll reaches 12 with the death in hospital of an 18-year-old soldier seriously injured in the bombing.
- 7 February
- 12 February – BBC1 first airs the children's television series Bagpuss, made by Peter Firmin and Oliver Postgate's Smallfilms in stop motion animation.
- 14 February
  - Bob Latchford, the Birmingham City centre forward, becomes Britain's most expensive footballer in a £350,000 move to Everton.

=== March ===
- 3 March – 180 Britons are among the dead when Turkish Airlines Flight 981 travelling from Paris to London crashes in a wood near Paris, killing all 346 aboard.
- 10 March – Ten miners die in a methane gas explosion at Golborne Colliery near Wigan, Lancashire.

=== April ===
The current system of metropolitan and non-metropolitan counties came into effect on 1 April 1974 and replaced the administrative counties and county boroughs, which were abolished at that time.

== Births ==
- 16 January – Kate Moss, English model
- 30 January – Christian Bale, English actor
- 12 February – Naseem Hamed, British boxer
- 22 February – James Blunt, singer-songwriter
- 7 March – Tobias Menzies, actor
- 17 April – Victoria Beckham, singer and designer
- 28 July – Hannah Waddingham, English actress and singer
- 5 September – Lauren Jeska, transgender fell runner convicted of the attempted murder of Ralph Knibbs
- 20 October – Mohammad Sidique Khan, Islamic terrorist, leader of the 7 July 2005 London bombings (died 2005)

== Deaths ==
- 12 January – Princess Patricia of Connaught (born 1886)
- 10 June – Prince Henry, Duke of Gloucester, last surviving child of George V (born 1900)
- 4 July – Georgette Heyer, English novelist (born 1902)
- 24 July – James Chadwick, English physicist, Nobel Prize laureate (born 1891)

== See also ==
- 1974 in Northern Ireland
- 1974 in Scotland
- 1974 in Wales
