= James Edward Nichols =

Welsh geneticist

Prof James Edward Nichols FRSE (22 November 1902 – 28 March 1972) was a Welsh geneticist.

== Life ==
He was born in Southport in Lancashire on 22 November 1902.

He was educated at Carlisle Grammar School then studied at Durham University graduating BSc in 1923 and MSc in 1924. He then went to the University of Edinburgh as a postgraduate gaining a doctorate (PhD) in 1927.

In 1928, aged 26, he was elected a Fellow of the Royal Society of Edinburgh. His proposers were Francis Albert Eley Crew, James Hartley Ashworth, James Ritchie and John Stephenson.

In 1935, aged 33, he became Professor of Agriculture at the University of Western Australia. He returned to Edinburgh in 1939 as Director of the Centre for Animal Breeding and Genetics. In 1946 he moved to Wales as Professor of Agriculture at Aberystwyth University College.

He retired in 1970 and died on 28 March 1972.

== Publications ==
- A Study of Empire Wool Production (1932)
- Livestock Improvement in Relation to Heredity and Environment (1957)
