= W. J. Gruffydd (Elerydd) =

Welsh archdruid (1916–2011)

William John Gruffydd (1916 – 21 April 2011), better known by his bardic name of Elerydd, was a Welsh Baptist minister and poet who served as Archdruid of the National Eisteddfod of Wales between 1984 and 1987.

Like all Archdruids, Elerydd was himself the winner of a major prize at the National Eisteddfod, in his case the crown at the Pwllheli Eisteddfod in 1955 and at Cardiff in 1960.

== Works ==
=== Poetry ===
- Ffenestri (1961)
- Cerddi'r Llygad (1973)

=== Autobiography ===
- Meddylu (1986)
- O Ffair Rhos i'r Maen Llog (2003)

=== Other ===
- Folklore and myth (1964)
- Tua Soar (1994–97) Capel Soar y Mynydd, Ceredigion.

Preceded by James Nicholas	Archdderwydd of the National Eisteddfod of Wales; 1984–1987	Succeeded by Emrys Roberts
