= Cecil Spiller =

Welsh cricketer

Personal information
- Full name: Cecil Willmington Spiller
- Born: 19 August 1900; Cardiff, Glamorgan, Wales
- Died: 5 April 1974 (aged 73); Cardiff, Glamorgan, Wales
- Batting: Right-handed
- Bowling: Right-arm medium

Domestic team information
- Years: Team
- 1922: Glamorgan

Career statistics
| Competition | FC |
|---|---|
| Matches | 2 |
| Runs scored | 20 |
| Batting average | 5.00 |
| 100s/50s | –/– |
| Top score | 14 |
| Balls bowled | 258 |
| Wickets | 4 |
| Bowling average | 36.00 |
| 5 wickets in innings | – |
| 10 wickets in match | – |
| Best bowling | 3/50 |
| Catches/stumpings | –/– |
- Source: Cricinfo, 26 June 2010

Cecil Willmington Spiller (19 August 1900 – 5 April 1974) was a Welsh cricketer. Spiller was a right-handed batsman who bowled right-arm medium pace.

Spiller represented Glamorgan in 2 first-class matches in 1920, against Sussex and the Hampshire.

Spiller died at Cardiff, Glamorgan on 5 April 1974.
