= Christine James =

Welsh poet and academic

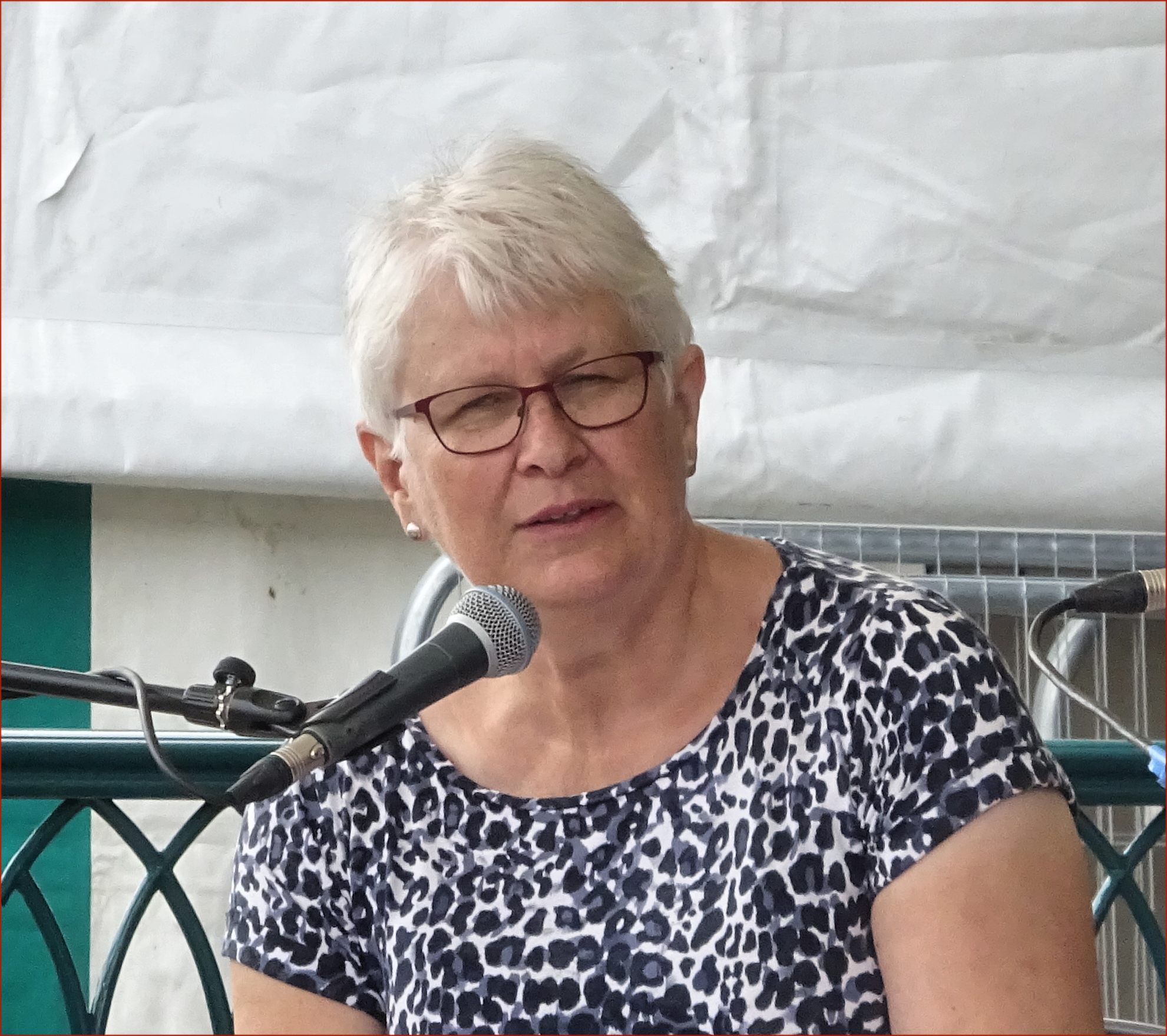
Christine James in 2018

Christine James FLSW (born 2 February 1954) is a Welsh poet and academic. She served as the first female Archdruid of Wales from June 2013 until June 2016. She first presided over the ceremonies at the National Eisteddfod in the 2013 Eisteddfod in Denbigh. Like all holders, she qualified by winning a major literary prize at a previous National Eisteddfod. She was elected Cofiadur (Recorder) of the Gorsedd of Bards at the National Eisteddfod in 2017, again as the first woman to hold the post. She is a recipient of the Wales Book of the Year.

== Life and academic career ==
Christine Mumford was born 2 February 1954, in Tonypandy, Rhondda, and educated at Porth County Grammar School. Later at Aberystwyth University she gained a first-class honours degree in Welsh and was subsequently awarded a PhD for a thesis on the Laws of Hywel Dda.

She currently lives in Cardiff and is an emeritus professor in the Department of Welsh, Academi Hywel Teifi, Swansea University. She is an elected Fellow of the Learned Society of Wales and of the Academi Gymreig (the Welsh Academy).

== Poetry ==
She won the Crown at the 2005 National Eisteddfod for a poetry collection inspired by works of art, including a number in the National Museum Cardiff.

Her first volume of poetry, rhwng y llinellau, was published by Cyhoeddiadau Barddas in 2013 and launched at the National Eisteddfod in Denbigh. It was awarded the prize for the best volume in the Poetry category in the Wales Book of the Year 2014 competition. Her second volume of poetry, rhwng dau feddwl, was published by Cyhoeddiadau Barddas in 2024.

Preceded by T. James Jones	Archdderwydd of the National Eisteddfod of Wales; 2013–2016	Succeeded by Geraint Lloyd Owen
