= Lluest-wen Reservoir =

Reservoir in the borough of Rhondda Cynon Taf, South Wales

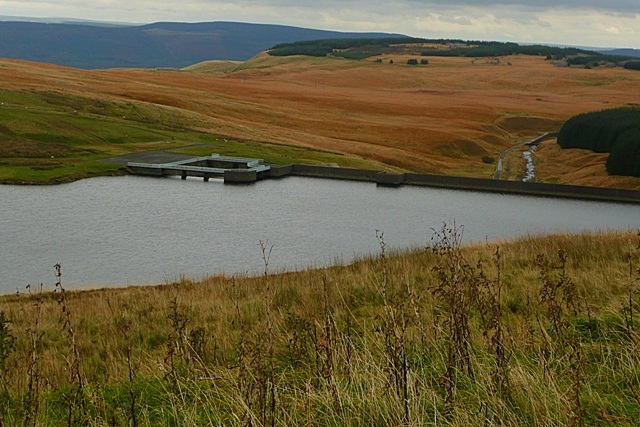

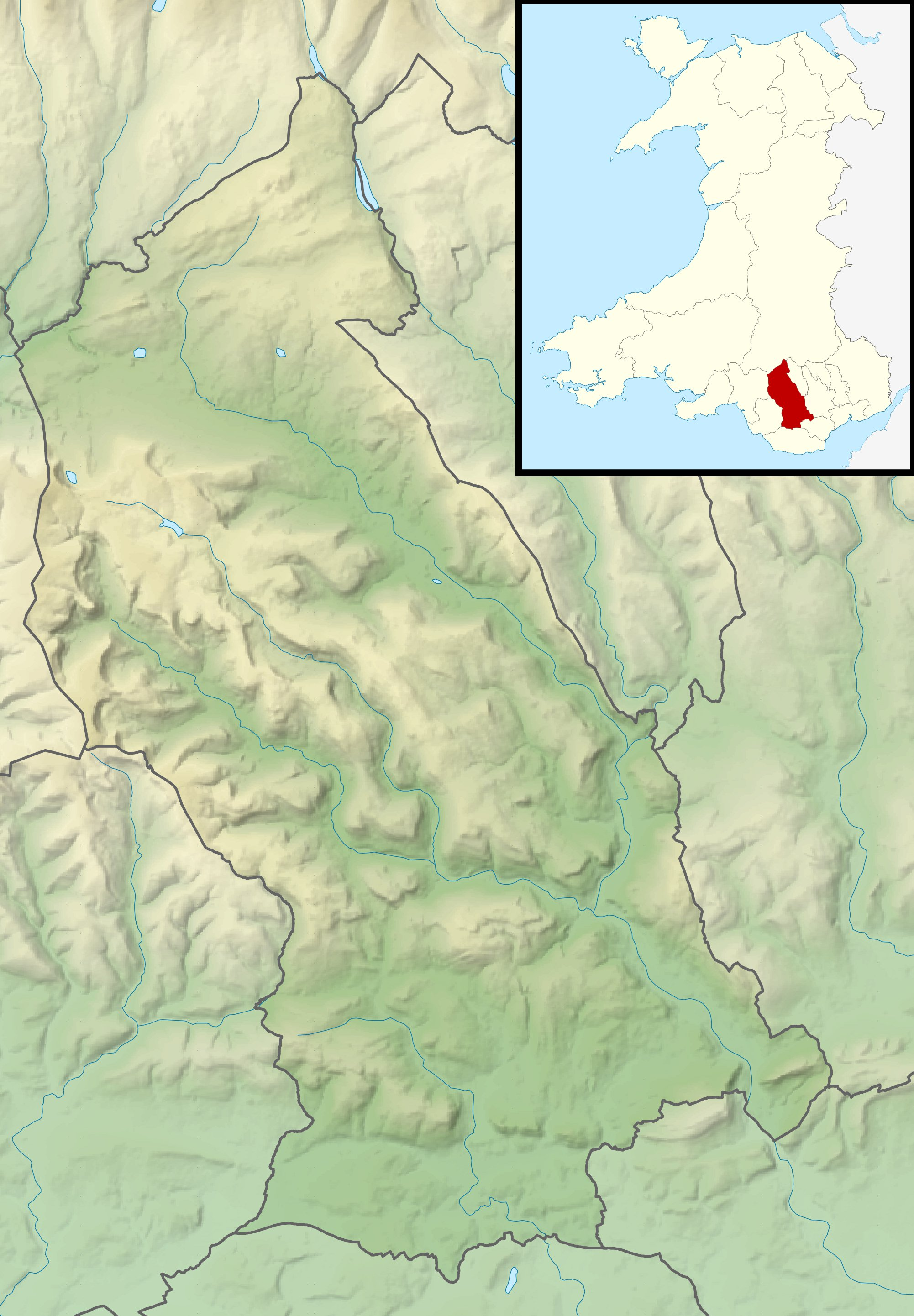
- Location within Rhondda Cynon Taf
- Location: Rhondda Fach Valley, South Wales Valleys, Wales
- Coordinates: 51.705°N 3.525°W
- Type: reservoir
- Basin countries: United Kingdom

Lluest-wen Reservoir (Welsh: Cronfa-ddwr Lluest-wen) is a reservoir at the top of the Rhondda Fach Valley (Welsh: Cwm Rhondda Fach), in the borough of Rhondda Cynon Taf, South Wales. Parts of it fall within the communities of Rhigos, Aberdare and Treherbert. A recreational walking route, the Coed Morgannwg Way, and route 47 of the National Cycle Network run northeast and southwest of it respectively.

The reservoir gained national attention in 1969 when significant damage was discovered that led to the evacuation of hundreds of nearby homes and prompted more than £1 million of emergency repair works.

== Geography and construction ==
The reservoir was built in 1898 and covers an area of 20 acres (8.1 ha). It was located at the top of the Rhondda Fach, near the village of Maerdy. The site holds around 242,000,000 imperial gallons (1.10×10^{9} L; 291,000,000 US gal) of water. The dam was built using earth embankments, the core of which were constructed of clay. The banks were reinforced during the early 1970s with 600-millimetre (24 in) thick concrete.

== History ==
Construction of the reservoir was completed in 1898. In its formative years, there were several incidents of the reservoir suffering damage. Two minor leaks in the embankments were fixed during the first decade. A larger leak was filled in with around 40 wheelbarrows of rubble in December 1910 and required refilling a year later. Settling issues caused further issues in the 1910s and rerouting work was undertaken when it was discovered that the top of the core in the embankments was only two feet (0.61 m) above the water level. In April 1917, a local official recommended that the reservoir be drained or the water level significantly lowered to avoid any risk of destabilising the dam. Work was carried out to address the issues and, by September of the same year, the reservoir was cleared of any further concerns.

On 11 November 1929, the area set a new maximum daily rainfall record for Wales when 211 millimetres (8.3 in) of rain fell, a record it retained as of 2016. As such, the site had been dubbed "the wettest place in Wales".

=== 1969 flood warning ===
In December 1969 there was a significant emergency when a local man discovered a large hole, measuring 5 ft (1.5 m) deep and 6 ft (1.8 m) long, after he and his horse fell into the crevice. The man alerted the emergency services who were able to free his horse and alerted the water department who sent experts to inspect the dam. The officials discovered a large crack in a pipe used to drain water from the drawoff shaft, which led to the evacuation of 350 houses, 7 schools and the relocation of miners from Maerdy Colliery. 150 elderly residents were evacuated to higher ground and around 2,000 people also fled the valley. As the reservoir did not feature any system to drain water which are utilised in more modern structures, in order to relieve the pressure on the damaged area, a combined effort from the army, Royal Air Force (RAF), local volunteers and the fire brigade was required to divert water away from the reservoir with the assistance of an RAF helicopter. An estimated 200–300 workers were utilised in the efforts.

To undertake repair work, the reservoir was drained by as much as 30 feet (9.1 m), leaving it at less than a third of its usual capacity. The workers were hampered in their efforts by the poor access to the site that delayed the arrival of heavy water pumping equipment. The work cost an estimated £1.5 million. More than 450 tons of cement and 80 tons of bentonite were injected into the cores of the embankment during the repair work. The dam was given the all clear by the end of January 1970, although further work was carried out in the following months. As part of the dam's new safety certificate, water was limited to 30 ft below the top watermark, the same level that the dam had been lowered to in order to avoid bursting.

=== Aftermath ===
As part of an investigation into the incident, substantial work was carried out on the reservoir to ensure it met the current safety standards. This included reinforcing the embankments with a 600 mm concrete barrier and the installation of new drain-off pipework (nearly double the size of the original). The incident played a part in the introduction of the 1975 Reservoirs Act that required supervising engineers to monitor large, raised reservoirs. The Secretary of State for Wales, George Thomas, 1st Viscount Tonypandy, ordered an inspection of all reservoirs in Wales over a certain age as a result, also declaring that "lives have been saved" by the emergency work carried out.

Two minor leaks were discovered at the end of the 20th century, although these were deemed to be of little threat to the structural integrity of the dam.
