= Sam Davies (footballer, born 1894) =

Welsh footballer

Personal information
- Full name: Samuel Herbert Davies
- Date of birth: 5 November 1894
- Place of birth: Wrexham, Wales
- Date of death: 1972 (aged 77–78)
- Position: Left back

Senior career*
| Years | Team | Apps | (Gls) |
| 1921–1922 | Queen's Park | 37 | (2) |
| 1922–1924 | Morton | 23 | (0) |
| 1924 | Manchester United | 0 | (0) |
| 1927 | Crewe Alexandra | 3 | (0) |
- Altrincham
- Sandbach Ramblers

International career
| 1922 | Wales Amateurs | 1 | (0) |
- * Club domestic league appearances and goals

Samuel Herbert Davies (5 November 1894 – 1972) was a Welsh amateur footballer who played in the Scottish League for Queen's Park and Morton as a left back. He was capped by Wales at amateur level.
