= Abruzzese cattle =

Cattle breed

Abruzzese
- Conservation status: extinct
- Other names: Podolica abruzzese di montagna
- Country of origin: Italy
- Distribution: Abruzzo
- Use: dual-purpose, meat and draught

Traits
- Weight: Male: 500–600 kg (1100–1300 lb); Female: 300–450 kg (660–990 lb)
- Coat: grey
- Horn status: horned

Notes
- of medium height

The Abruzzese or Podolica abruzzese di montagna is an extinct breed of domestic cattle from the Abruzzo region of southern Italy. It belonged to the Podolic group of cattle, and was a dual-purpose breed, kept both for meat and for draught use. The breed was listed as extinct by the Food and Agriculture Organization of the United Nations in 2007.
