= Bill Perry (rugby union) =

Wales international rugby union footballer

- Born: William John Perry; 22 September 1886 Neath, Wales
- Died: 16 February 1970 (aged 83) Neath, Wales
- Occupation: police officer

Rugby union career
- Position: Lock
Amateur team(s)
Years	Team	Apps	(Points)
- Neath Borough Police
–	Neath RFC		
–	Glamorgan		
International career
Years	Team	Apps	(Points)
1911	Wales	1	(0)

William John Perry (22 September 1886 – 16 February 1970) was a Welsh rugby union player who played rugby union at club level for Neath and was also selected to represent Glamorgan County. Perry represented Wales on one occasion, facing England in 1911.

== International matches ==
Wales

- England 1911
