= T. James Jones =

Welsh poet, scriptwriter and former Archdruid

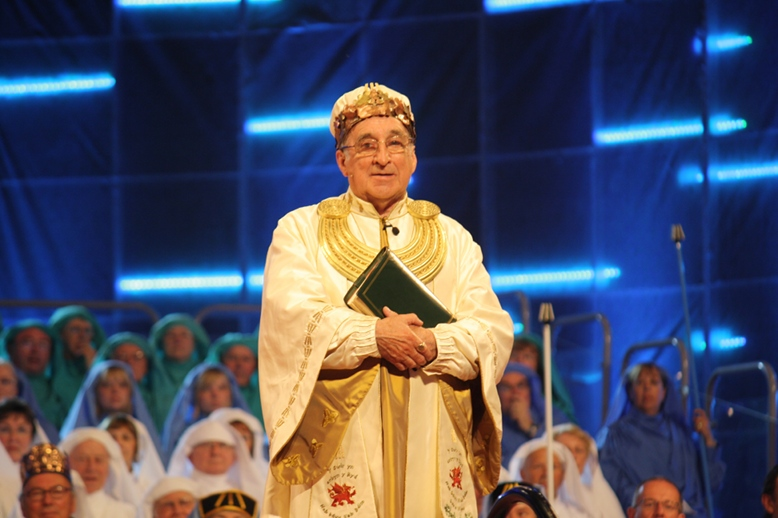
Jones on the stage of the 2011 Wrexham Eisteddfod, during the Coronation Ceremony.

T. James Jones (born 1934) is a Welsh poet and dramatist, and former Archdruid of the National Eisteddfod of Wales. He is also known by the bardic name Jim Parc Nest.

Brought up in Newcastle Emlyn, Jones is the brother of two other Welsh-language writers, John Gwilym Jones and Aled Gwyn, both of whom have won major prizes in the National Eisteddfod; a documentary about the three brothers, Bois Parc Nest, was shown on S4C in 2018. He attended Aberystwyth University and Presbyterian College in Carmarthen.

Jones was a Congregational minister in Mynyddbach, Swansea, and Priordy, Carmarthen, prior to working as a lecturer in Welsh and Drama at Trinity College, Carmarthen. He later joined BBC Wales as script editor on the Welsh language soap Pobol y Cwm. In 1967 his translation of Dylan Thomas's play, Under Milk Wood, with the title Dan y Wenallt, was performed at the Laugharne Festival.

In 2009 he was nominated to succeed Dic Jones as Archdruid. Like all Archdruids, he was a former winner of a major prize at the Eisteddfod, having won the crown on two occasions and the chair once. In 2019, after his tenure as Archdruid was over, he won the chair for a second time. This was the first time a former archdruid had won a major prize at the Eisteddfod.

In June 2011, Jones claimed that "Britishness" threatened Welsh identity, and suggested that Welsh medal-winners at the 2012 Summer Olympics should be accompanied by the raising of the Welsh flag and the Welsh national anthem, rather than the British flag and anthem. Jones, likewise, suggested that similar nations should be protected, including Cornwall, Brittany, and the Basque Country. Welsh Conservative MP David Davies said he was "talking rubbish" as most Welsh people were proud to be both British and Welsh.

Jones is married to author Manon Rhys; the couple have two children each from previous marriages. He is the uncle of poet Tudur Dylan Jones.

| Preceded by Dic Jones | Archdderwydd of the National Eisteddfod of Wales; 2010–2013 | Succeeded by Christine James |
