= Hubert Rhys =

Welsh cricketer

Personal information
- Full name: Hubert Ralph John Rhys
- Born: 31 August 1897; Aberdare, Glamorgan, Wales
- Died: 18 March 1970 (aged 72); Llandaff, Glamorgan, Wales
- Batting: Right-handed

Domestic team information
- Years: Team
- 1934: Monmouthshire
- 1930: Wales
- 1929–1930: Glamorgan

Career statistics
Competition	First-class
Matches	10
Runs scored	383
Batting average	21.27
100s/50s	1/1
Top score	149
Balls bowled	–
Wickets	–
Bowling average	–
5 wickets in innings	–
10 wickets in match	–
Best bowling	–
Catches/stumpings	–/–
- Source: Cricinfo, 21 April 2012

Hubert Ralph John Rhys (31 August 1897 – 18 March 1970) was a Welsh cricketer. Rhys was a right-handed batsman. He was born at Aberdare, Glamorgan, and was educated at Shrewsbury School.

Rhys made his first-class debut for the Free Foresters against Cambridge University in 1929, making a century on debut with a score of 149 in the Free Foresters first-innings. This would be the only time he would make a century in his brief first-class career. In that same season he made his first-class debut for Glamorgan in the County Championship against Leicestershire at Ynysangharad Park, Pontypridd. He made a further appearance in that season against Surrey. In the following season, Rhys made five first-class appearances for Glamorgan, the last of which came against Sussex, which was also his final match for the county. Rhys made a total of seven first-class appearances for Glamorgan, scoring 147 runs at an average of 12.25, with a high score of 35. In that same season he also made two further first-class appearances: one for the Free Foresters against Cambridge University, in which he recorded his only first-class half century with a score of 73, while another appearance came for Wales against the Marylebone Cricket Club. Rhys later appeared in a single Minor Counties Championship match for Monmouthshire against Berkshire in 1934.

He died at Llandaff, Glamorgan, on 18 March 1970.
