= Alun Ogwen Williams =

Welsh teacher

- Born: 2 October 1904; Gerlan
- Died: 4 August 1970

Alun Ogwen Williams (2 October 1904 – 4 August 1970) was a teacher and prominent Eisteddfod supporter and administrator.

Born 1904 in Well Street, Gerlan, Bethesda, Caernarfonshire, Williams was the son of John Samuel Williams and Catherine (née Thomas). He attended school locally and then went to Bangor Normal College where he trained as a teacher between 1922 and 1924. From college he, as a teacher went to Llanfairfechan (1924–26) and Pwllheli (1926–36) before being selected as headteacher at schools in Pentre Uchaf (1936–42), Penmachno (1942–52) and Leeswood (1952–63). In 1963 he retired to Rhyl however he resumed teaching Welsh in Offa's Dyke Comprehensive School, Prestatyn until 1965

He was notable as a reciter, actor and adjudicator in the Welsh Eisteddfod scene for his entire life. He set up Parti Penmachno, a show party which toured Wales and England during World War II and later. He was a member of the Gorsedd for 40 years, serving as chief marshal. He was also membership secretary of the Eisteddfod Court for much of his life.

He is father of the author Euryn Ogwen Williams.

He died on 4 August 1970, aged 65, in Ammanford where the National Eisteddfod was held that year.
