= Bill Davies (cricketer, born 1906) =

Welsh cricketer

Personal information
- Full name: William David Edward Davies
- Born: 26 August 1906; Briton Ferry, Glamorgan, Wales
- Died: 1 October 1971 (aged 65); Briton Ferry, Glamorgan, Wales
- Batting: Right-handed
- Bowling: Leg break googly

Domestic team information
- Years: Team
- 1932–1935: Glamorgan

Career statistics
Competition	FC
Matches	7
Runs scored	122
Batting average	11.09
100s/50s	–/–
Top score	32
Balls bowled	78
Wickets	–
Bowling average	–
5 wickets in innings	–
10 wickets in match	–
Best bowling	–
Catches/stumpings	2/–
- Source: Cricinfo, 5 July 2010

William David Edward Davies (26 August 1906 - 1 October 1971) was a Welsh cricketer. Davies was a right-handed batsman who bowled leg break googly. He was born at Briton Ferry, Glamorgan.

Morgan made his first-class debut for Glamorgan in 1932 against Leicestershire. From 1932 to 1935, he represented the county in 7 first-class matches, with his final match for the county coming against Essex. In his 7 first-class matches, he scored 122 runs batting average of 11.09, with a high score of 32. In the field he took 2 catches.

Davies died at the town of his birth on 1 October 1971.
