= Emrys Roberts (poet) =

Welsh poet and archdruid

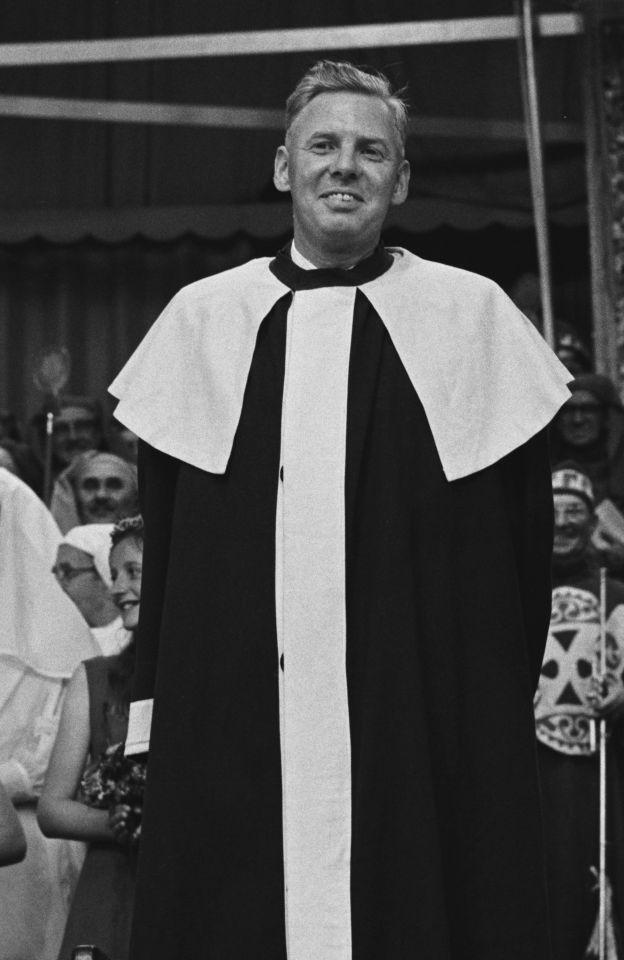
Emrys Roberts at the 1971 National Eisteddfod

Emrys Roberts (1929 – 30 March 2012) was a Welsh language poet and author, who was Archdruid of the National Eisteddfod of Wales.

Born in Liverpool, Roberts grew up in Penrhyndeudraeth and studied at the Bangor Normal College before becoming a teacher. He twice won the chair at the National Eisteddfod of Wales, in 1967 and 1971. In 1987 he was made Archdruid and led the Gorsedd of Bards at the National Eisteddfod between 1987 and 1990 under the bardic name Emrys Deudraeth.

Preceded by W. J. Gruffydd (Elerydd)	Archdderwydd of the National Eisteddfod of Wales; 1987–1990	Succeeded by William R. P. George
