= Lillian Griffith =

British sculptor (1877–1972)

Lillian E A Griffith
- Born: 14 July 1877; Abersychan, Monmouthshire, Wales
- Died: 1972 (aged 94–95); Monmouthshire
- Education: Wimbledon College of Art; Slade School of Fine Art; Westminster School of Art
- Known for: Sculpture

Lilian Elizabeth A Griffith (14 July 1877 – 1972) was a Welsh artist who painted miniatures and created sculptures and portrait busts, plaques and medallions.

== Biography ==
Griffith was born at Abersychan in Monmouthshire, and studied at the Wimbledon College of Art, the Slade School of Fine Art and the Westminster School of Art where she studied sculpture under the artists Alfred Gilbert and Alfred Drury. She produced sculptures and portrait busts, often in marble or bronze, plaques and medallions and painted miniatures. From 1902 to 1959 Griffith regularly had works shown at the Royal Academy in London. She also exhibited at the Salon des Artistes Francais in Paris in 1911 and at a number of British galleries, including the Walker Art Gallery in Liverpool. She also exhibited with the South Wales Art Society between 1927 and 1936. Griffith also taught miniature painting at the Swansea Art School and for Glamorgan County Council. For a long period she lived at Hengoed in Glamorgan but also at Maesteg and Pentre. The National Museum Cardiff holds examples of her work.
