= A. J. R. Russell-Wood =

Anthony John Russell Russell-Wood (1939 – August 13, 2010) was a leading historian of colonial Brazil, the Portuguese Empire, and the broader Luso-Brazilian world.

== Life ==
Russell-Wood was born in Wales. He was educated at Rossall School and Oxford University and became a member of the faculty of the Department of History at the Johns Hopkins University in Baltimore, Maryland, in 1971. In 2006, the City Council of Salvador da Bahia, Brazil, made him an honorary citizen. At the time of his death, he was the Herbert Baxter Adams Professor of History at Johns Hopkins. He died, aged 70, in Baltimore, Maryland.

== Publications ==
His first book, Fidalgos and Philanthropists: The Santa Casa da Misericórdia of Bahia, 1550-1755 (1968), was an ambitious study covering two centuries of the operation and impact of a key, royally chartered and privately financed social-welfare institution of the Portuguese Empire. It was awarded the 1969 Herbert Eugene Bolton Prize (now the Bolton-Johnson Prize) by the Congress of Latin American Historians. His second book was a path-breaking work on the Afro-Brazilian experience, The Black Man in Slavery and Freedom in Colonial Brazil (1982); it paid particular attention to regional particularities within Brazil and the importance of brotherhood societies in Afro-Brazilian history. World on the Move: The Portuguese in Africa, Asia, and America, 1415-1808 (1992) explored the Portuguese Empire as the world's first truly global empire, though one often overshadowed in the public imagination by the Spanish Empire; Russell-Wood was intrigued by how the Portuguese made sense of their exposure to the once unimaginable vastness of the world, its people, languages, culture, flora, and fauna.
