= Dafydd Rowlands =

Welsh writer (1931–2001)

David Heslin Rowlands (25 December 1931 – 26 April 2001) was a Congregational minister, lecturer and writer. Rowlands won the crown at the National Eisteddfod in 1969 and 1972, and was made archdruid in 1996.

== Life history ==
Rowlands was born in Pontardawe in 1931; his father, Lewis Dennis Rowlands, was a steelworker. His father abandoned the family when Dafydd was ten; he never saw his father again. Rowlands was educated at University College, Swansea, where he gained a degree in Welsh. He then went on to train for the ministry at the Presbyterian College in Carmarthen. After leaving education he worked as a Congregational minister. In 1959 he married Margaret Morris; the couple had three sons. Rowlands left the ministry and became a teacher at Garw Grammar School in Pontycymer. In 1968 he was appointed to the staff of Trinity College Carmarthen, in the Welsh Department. He left in 1983 and began a career as a scriptwriter and programme presenter. His programmes included documentaries about the poet Gwenallt Jones, the hymn-writer Ann Griffiths and the daughters of Rebecca, 1840s rioters in West Wales. He wrote scripts for Pobol y Cwm, the Welsh language soap and Licrys Olsorts, the Welsh-language counterpart of Last of the Summer Wine.

In 1969, Rowlands was awarded the crown at the National Eisteddfod held at Flint for his sequence of poems I Gwestiynau fy Mab. He was again awarded the crown in 1972, this time in Pembrokeshire with his work 'Dadeni'. and that same year he won the Prose Medal for his volume of essays Ysgrifau yr Hanner Bardd. This was followed by three collections of poetry, Meini (1972), Yr Wythfed (1975) and Sobers a Fi (1995) and in 1980 he produced a pamphlet of prose poetry Paragraffau o Serbia. In 1977 Rowlands wrote the experimental Mae Theomemphus yn Hen, a prose novel in the Welsh language. In the novel he explored his relationship with his father in an uncompromising self-examination, rarely seen in modern Welsh literature. He was archdruid (David Rowland) from 1996 to 1999.

Rowlands died of ischaemic heart disease in 2001.

Preceded by John Gwilym Jones	Archdderwydd of the National Eisteddfod of Wales; 1996-1999	Succeeded by Meirion Evans
