= David Abruzzese =

Welsh footballer

Personal information
- Full name: David John Abruzzese
- Date of birth: 8 October 1969 (age 57)
- Place of birth: Aberdare, Wales
- Position: Full-back

Senior career*
Years	Team	Apps	(Gls)
1986–1988	Newport County	25	(0)
1988	Torquay United	0	(0)
1988–1989	Merthyr Tydfil		
1989–1990	Barry Town	23	(0)
- ENTO Aberaman

Managerial career
- 2004–2005: ENTO Aberaman
- * Club domestic league appearances and goals

David John Abruzzese (Italian pronunciation: [abrutˈtseːze, -eːse]; born 8 October 1969) is a Welsh former professional footballer. He represented Wales at youth level.

Abruzzese, a full-back, joined Newport County in 1986, playing 25 times in Newport's final two seasons in the Football League. In 1988, after County's second successive relegation and the club in financial ruin, he joined Torquay United, but left to join Merthyr Tydfil without making the Torquay first team.

He subsequently moved to Barry Town and in the 2001–02 and 2004–05 seasons was playing for ENTO Aberaman. He was appointed as manager in June 2004 but left the role in 2005. He later played for Penrhiwceiber Rangers and Osborne Athletic.

== Personal life ==
Abruzzese has a son named Rhys who is also a footballer and was part of the academy at Cardiff City. His other son, Dewi, currently plays for Cambrian & Clydach Vale.
