= Reg Anderson (cricketer) =

Welsh cricketer

Personal information
- Full name: Reginald Mervyn Bulford Anderson
- Born: 25 April 1914; Brynhyfryd, Glamorgan, Wales
- Died: 12 August 1972 (aged 58); Uplands, Glamorgan, Wales
- Batting: Right handed
- Bowling: Right-arm fast-medium

Domestic team information
- Years: Team
- 1946: Glamorgan

Career statistics
Competition	FC
Matches	1
Runs scored	0
Batting average	0
100s/50s	-/-
Top score	0
Balls bowled	108
Wickets	0
Bowling average	-
5 wickets in innings	-
10 wickets in match	-
Best bowling	-
Catches/stumpings	0/-
- Source: CricketArchive, 12 August 2008

Reginald Mervyn Bulford Anderson (25 April 1914 – 12 August 1972) was a Welsh first-class cricketer who played his only game for Glamorgan in 1946 against Hampshire. He was an opening bowler. He also played for Glamorgan Second XI in the Minor Counties Championship.
