= Abbruzzi =

Abbruzzi is a surname of Italian origin. People with this surname include:

- Lou Abbruzzi (1917–1982), American football running back
- Pat Abbruzzi (1932–1998), American football running back and coach; brother of Lou
