= Dafydd Ifans =

Welsh writer

- Born: 21 April 1949 (age 77); Aberystwyth, Wales
- Occupations: Novelist, translator, librarian
- Writing career
- Language: Welsh, English
- Genre: History of Welsh literature
- Notable work: Eira gwyn yn Salmon (1974)

Dafydd Ifans (born 21 April 1949) is a contemporary Welsh language novelist and translator, born in Aberystwyth in Ceredigion, west Wales.

== Early life and education ==
Dafydd Ifans was born in Aberystwyth, Wales in 1949. After finishing in Ysgol Gymraeg Aberystwyth in 1960, between 1960 and 1967 he studied at the Ardwyn Grammar School in Aberystwyth. In 1970 he got his BA-degree at the University of Wales in Bangor. In 1972 he got his diploma in palaeography and archive administration, and his MA in 1974.

== Career ==
From 1972 until 1975 he served a research assistant at the Department of Manuscripts and Records in the National Library of Wales. Later he became an assistant keeper in the same department, until 2002. In 2002 he became an assistant director and head of the special collections, and in 2005 he served as an assistant director and head of acquisitions in the same library. At the National Eisteddfod of Wales in 1974, he won the Prose Medal for his novel Eira Gwyn yn Salmon. He edited the 60-year correspondence between Kate Roberts and Saunders Lewis, published in 1992..

== Publications ==
- 1974 – Eira gwyn yn Salmon
- 1977 – Tyred Drosodd – Gohebiaeth Eluned Morgan a Nantlais gyda rhagymadrodd a nodiadau
- 1980 – Ofn
- 1980 – Y Mabinogion (with Rhiannon Ifans)
- 1982 – William Salesbury and The Welsh Law
- 1982 – The Diary of Francis Kilvert April–June 1870 (with Kathleen Hughes)
- 1989 – Dathlwn Glod – Ysgol Gymraeg Aberystwyth 1939–1989
- 1989 – The Diary of Francis Kilvert June–July 1870 (ed.)
- 1992 – Annwyl Kate, Annwyl Saunders – Gohebiaeth 1923–1983 (ed.)
- 1994 – Cofrestri Anghydffurfiol Cymru/Nonconformist Registers of Wales
- 1997 – Taith y Pererin i'r teulu (with John Bunyan and Victor Mitchell)
- 1998 – Trysorfa Cenedl – Llyfrgell Genedlaethol Cymru
- 1998 – The Nation's Heritage – The National Library of Wales
- 1998 – Y Mabinogion -Hud yr hen chwedlau Celtaidd
- 2004 – Gwladfa Kyffin / Kyffin in Patagonia
- 2007 – Annwyl Kate
