= Bryan Martin Davies =

Bryan Martin Davies (8 April 1933 – 19 August 2014) was a Welsh poet, author and translator, who worked as a teacher.

Davies was born in the village of Brynamman, the son of a coalminer, Horace Davies, and his wife Evelyn (née Martin), and was brought up with Welsh as his first language. He was educated at Amman Valley Grammar School and went on to the University College of Wales, Aberystwyth. During this period, he produced an MA thesis on the work of the poet D. Gwenallt Jones. After completing national service with the North Staffordshire Regiment, he became a teacher, first at Ysgol Rhiwabon and later at Yale Sixth Form College, where he was head of the Welsh Department and taught the poet Grahame Davies.

Having won a crown for his poetry at a university eisteddfod, Davies began to write poetry seriously. On moving to Wrexham, he became friendly with the poet Euros Bowen, and founded a literary society locally. He twice won the crown at the National Eisteddfod of Wales, at Ammanford in 1970 and at Bangor in 1971. In the years that followed, he became an adjudicator at the National Eisteddfod, a role he performed in 1973, 1977, 1979, 1980, 1988 and 1991. In 1980 he gave a public lecture on the poet Watcyn Wyn, which was described by Meic Stephens as "a perfect example of what is expected of speakers on such prestigious occasions: informative, scholarly, witty and moving..."

== Personal life ==
Davies was diagnosed with a form of cancer during the 1980s and took early retirement from Yale. His wife Gwenda, whom he married in 1958, was diagnosed with multiple sclerosis and died in 1996. Davies himself moved to Ystradowen to be near his two daughters, and died aged 82.

== Legacy ==
Davies's work has been included on the syllabus for the GCSE exam in Welsh literature.

In 2015, a quotation from Davies's poem "Glas" was selected as one of "15 of the most beautiful lines ever written in the Welsh language". The line chosen was "Dilynem ddartiau gwyn y gwylain aflonydd yn trywanu targed y creigiau" ("We follow the restless seagulls' white darts as they pierce the rocks").

== Works ==
=== Poetry ===
- Darluniau ar Gynfas (1970)
- Y Golau Caeth (1972)
- Deuoliaethau (1976)
- Lleoedd (1984)
- Pan Oedd y Nos yn Wenfflam (1988)

=== Novels ===
- Gardag (1988)

=== Translations ===
- Prolog Chwedlau Caergaint (Prologue to the Canterbury Tales) (1983)
