= Gwynfor Davies =

Welsh cricketer

Personal information
- Full name: Gwynfor Davies
- Born: 12 August 1908; Sandy, Carmarthenshire, Wales
- Died: 10 March 1972 (aged 63); Llanelli, Carmarthenshire, Wales
- Batting: Right-handed
- Bowling: Right-arm medium
- Relatives: Emrys Davies (brother)

Domestic team information
- Years: Team
- 1932: Glamorgan

Career statistics
Competition	FC
Matches	7
Runs scored	77
Batting average	9.62
100s/50s	–/–
Top score	44
Balls bowled	312
Wickets	3
Bowling average	44.66
5 wickets in innings	–
10 wickets in match	–
Best bowling	2/18
Catches/stumpings	2/–
- Source: Cricinfo, 4 July 2010

Gwynfor Davies (12 August 1908 – 10 March 1972) was a Welsh cricketer. Davies was a right-handed batsman who bowled right-arm medium pace. He was born at Sandy, Carmarthenshire.

Davies made his first-class debut for Glamorgan in the 1932 County Championship against Lancashire. He played a further 6 first-class matches in the 1932 season, with his final first-class appearance for the county coming against Leicestershire. In his 7 first-class matches, he scored 77 runs at a batting average of 9.62, with a top score of 44. With the ball he took 3 wickets at a bowling average of 44.66, with best figures 2/18.

Davies died at Llanelli, Carmarthenshire on 10 March 1972.

== Family ==
Davies' brother Emrys played 621 first-class matches for Glamorgan and holds a number of the club's records.
