= Gwilym Tilsley =

Welsh bard (1911–1997)

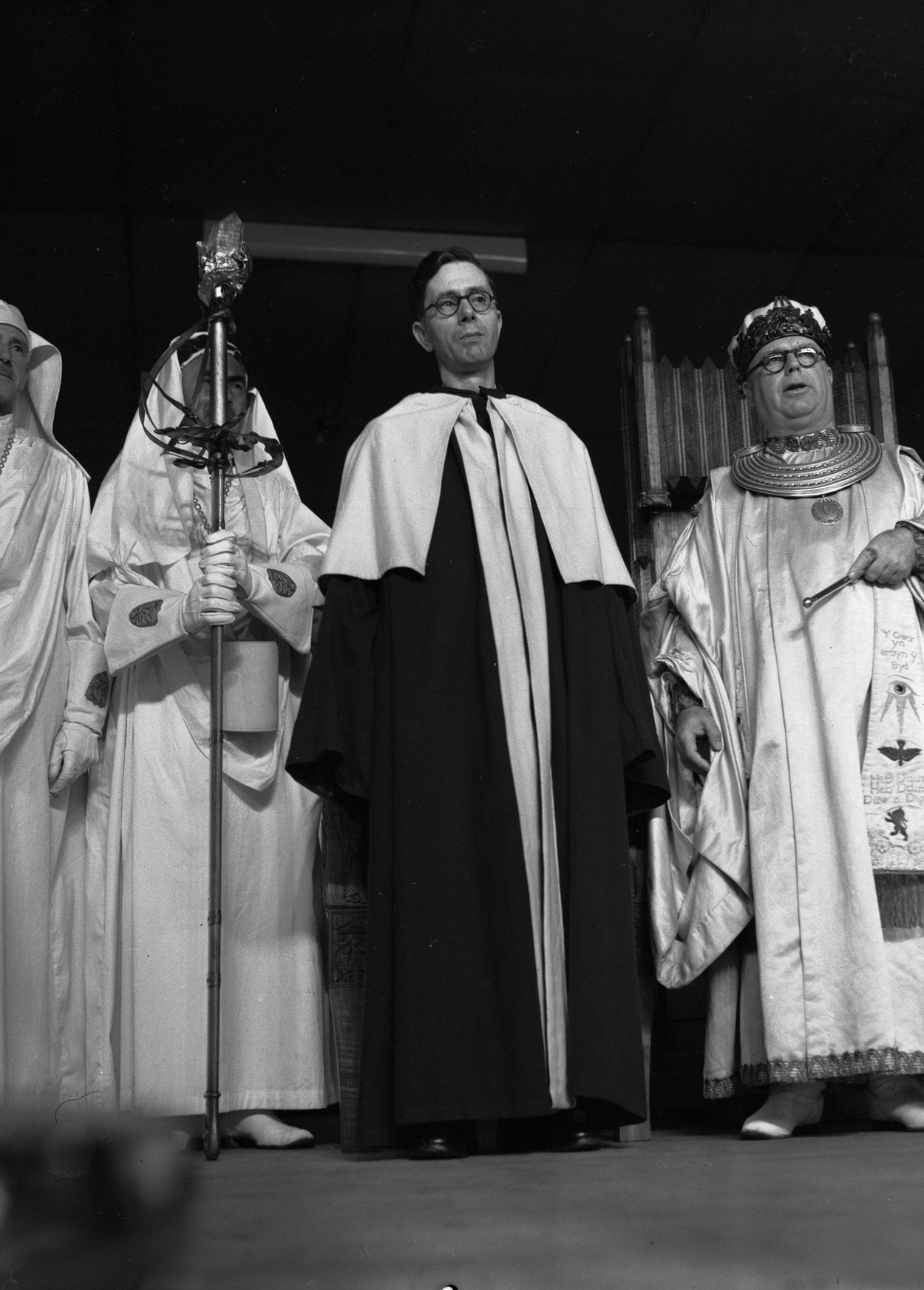
Tilsley (center) at the National Eisteddfod of Wales 1950, Caerphilly

Rev. Gwilym Richard Tilsley (26 May 1911 – 30 August 1997), commonly known by his bardic name of "Tilsli", was a Welsh poet who served as Archdruid of the National Eisteddfod of Wales between 1969 and 1972.

He was born at Tŷ Llwyd near Llanidloes and educated at Manledd primary school, Llanidloes County School, the University of Wales, Aberystwyth and Wesley House, Cambridge, before entering the (Wesleyan) Methodist ministry.

As a Methodist minister, he served in Commins Coch near Machynlleth (1939 to 1942), Pontrhydygroes in Cardiganshire (1942 to 1945), Aberdare (1945 to 1950), Colwyn Bay (1950 to 1955), Llanrwst (1955 to 1960), Caernarfon (1960 to 1965), Rhyl (1965 to 1970) and Wrexham (1970 to 1975) before retiring to Prestatyn. This experience of the itinerant life of a Methodist minister in both north and south Wales inspired the two heroic poems to the industrial worker which brought him to prominence:

He won the chair at the National Eisteddfod of Wales at Caerphilly in 1950 for a poem Moliant i'r Glöwr in praise of the coal miner, and again at Llangefni in 1957 with the poem Cwm Carnedd about the life of the slate quarryman.

Tilsley wrote the words of several Welsh hymns, including Am ffydd, nefol dad, y deisyfwn ("I beseech Thee for faith, O Heavenly Father")

He married Anne Eluned Jones (1908–2003) in 1945. A son, Gareth Maldwyn Tilsley, was born in 1946.

== Works ==
- Y glöwr a cherddi eraill (1957)

Preceded by E. Gwyndaf Evans	Archdruid of the National Eisteddfod of Wales; 1969–1972	Succeeded by Brinley Richards
