= John Ormond =

Welsh poet and film-maker (1923–1990)

John Ormond (3 April 1923 – 4 May 1990), also known as John Ormond Thomas, was a Welsh poet and film-maker.

== Biography ==
John Ormond Thomas was born on 3 April 1923 in Wales, at Dunvant, near Swansea. He studied philosophy and English at Swansea University, and at the same time studied painting at the Swansea School of Art.

His early verse appeared in various periodicals, including Poetry Folios as Ormond Thomas. As John Ormond Thomas, his work appeared with that of James Kirkup and John Bayliss in Indications (1943), published by the Grey Walls Press.

After graduation in 1945, on the strength of a portfolio of poems sent to the editor Tom Hopkinson, he was offered a three-month trial at Picture Post in London, after which he was made a staff writer.

He returned to Swansea in 1949, as a sub-editor on the South Wales Evening Post. During this time, friendships forged with Daniel Jones, Vernon Watkins, Alfred Janes and other members of Dylan Thomas's Kardomah gang, including Thomas himself, would be a formative influence. However, Watkins' advice that he should not publish a further collection until he was 30 made him hyper-critical of his own poetry. He also destroyed much of it. In January 1955, Tom Hopkinson, now features editor of the News Chronicle, invited him to write verses for the Saturday Picture. Publishing these as John Ormond, thus establishing that as his professional name, he continued to contribute weekly verses for two and a half years.

In July 1955 Ormond began a career with BBC Wales in Cardiff, working with the fledgling news-service. In 1957 he became head of the BBC Welsh Film Unit where in due course he began his first documentaries. The success of Borrowed Pasture (1960), his portrait of two Polish exiles struggling to eke out a living on a derelict farm in Carmarthenshire, immediately established him as a film-maker. It is still regarded as a classic of its time. In 1961, he was appointed as a director and producer of documentary films, which included studies of Ceri Richards, Kyffin Williams, Dylan Thomas, Alun Lewis and R. S. Thomas.

Ormond 'returned' to poetry in the mid-1960s, publishing in the periodical Poetry Wales. His first major volume, Requiem and Celebration, was published in 1969. His reputation was enhanced in 1973 by the appearance of Definition of a Waterfall and his inclusion in Penguin Modern Poets. In 1975, Ormond received the Cholmondeley Award for poetry. A volume of selected poems was published in 1987.

He died in 1990, aged 67.

== Publications ==
- John Ormond: Collected Poems, edited by Rian Evans, with an Introduction by Patrick McGuinness (2015)
- Cathedral Builders (1991)
- Selected Poems (1987)
- Definition of a Waterfall (1973)
- Requiem and Celebration (1969)
- Indications (1943)
