= Brinley Richards =

Welsh writer (1904–1981)

Brinley Richards (13 April 1904 – 18 September 1981) was a Welsh language poet and author, who was Archdruid of the National Eisteddfod of Wales from 1972 to 1975.

Richards was born in Cwm Llynfi, Glamorgan in South Wales, and was named after the musician and composer Henry Brinley Richards (1819–1885). He attended Maesteg Grammar School and spent a year at Cardiff University. He lived on Church Street in Maesteg, a few doors above Bethel English Baptist Chapel, and had a legal practice there for most of his later years.

At the Llanrwst Eisteddfod of 1951, he won the chair, qualifying him to become Archdruid in due course. His bardic name as Archdruid was Brinli.

His collected poems, Cerddi'r Dyffryn, were published in 1967.

He is buried along with his wife Muriel in St Cynwyds church in Llangynwyd.

Preceded by Gwilym Tilsley	Archdruid of the National Eisteddfod of Wales; 1972–1975	Succeeded by Richard Bryn Williams
