= E. Gwyndaf Evans =

Welsh poet

- Born: 7 March 1913
- Died: 10 March 1986 (aged 73)
- Language: Welsh
- Genre: poetry
- Notable works: Magdalen

Archdruid of the National Eisteddfod of Wales
- In office 1966–1969

Evan Gwyndaf Evans or "Gwyndaf" (7 March 1913 – 10 March 1986) was a Welsh poet who served as Archdruid of the National Eisteddfod of Wales from 1966 to 1969.

Gwyndaf came from Llanfachreth, Gwynedd. He was minister of Tabernacle Chapel, Llanelli, from 1935 until 1957, and taught Scripture at Ysgol Brynrefail, Llanrug from 1957 until 1978.

Like all Archdruids, Gwyndaf was a former winner of a major prize at the National Eisteddfod. He won the Chair at the Caernarfon Eisteddfod of 1935 with his poem Magdalen, the first time a poem in vers libre, combined with the traditional cynghanedd, had won the competition.

== Legacy ==
The chair won by Gwyndaf at the 1935 Eisteddfod was presented by Welsh expatriates in New Zealand. After the death of Gwyndaf's wife, it was left to the National Library of Wales, along with his portrait.

== Works ==
- Magdalen a cherddi eraill (Gwasg Gomer, 1962)
- Cerddi Gwyndaf: y casgliad cyflawn (Denbigh: Gwasg Gee, 1987 ISBN 0707401275)
