= Urien Wiliam =

Welsh novelist and dramatist (1929–2006)

Urien Wiliam (7 November 1929 – 21 October 2006) was a Welsh language novelist and dramatist.

Wiliam was born in Barry, Vale of Glamorgan, the son of Professor Stephen J. Williams, an academic at Swansea University. He became an expert in the grammar of Welsh, and studied the language at Swansea University, before undertaking a doctorate in psychology at Liverpool University in which he translated the Wechsler Intelligence Scale for Children into Welsh, and produced norms for Welsh-speaking children.

His first teaching post was at Trinity College, Carmarthen. He married Eiryth Davies and had three children, including Sioned Wiliam.

He won the Drama Medal at the National Eisteddfod of Wales in 1972 and 1973. After becoming a freelance writer, he produced scripts for the Welsh-language children's TV programme, Wil Cwac Cwac.

He died at Penarth.

== Works ==
=== Plays ===
- Cawl Cennin (1969)
- Y Ffin (1970)
- Y Llyw Olaf (1972)
- Y Pypedau (1973)

=== Novels ===
- Dirgelwch y rocedi (1968)
- Pluen yn fy het a Stafell Ddwbl (1970)
- Perygl o'r Sêr (1972)
- Tu Hwnt i'r Mynydd Du (1975)
- Chwilio Gem (1980)
- Breuddwyd Rhy Bell (1995)

== Sources ==
- Obituary
