= Islwyn Ffowc Elis =

Welsh language writer

Islwyn Ffowc Elis (Welsh pronunciation: [ˈɪslʊɨn fɔʊk ˈɛlɪs]; 17 November 1924 – 22 January 2004) was one of Wales's most popular Welsh-language writers.

== Early life and career ==
Born Islwyn Ffoulkes Ellis in Wrexham and raised in Glyn Ceiriog, Elis was educated at the University of Wales colleges of Bangor and Aberystwyth. During World War II he was a conscientious objector and he began writing poetry and prose, winning the prose medal at the 1951 National Eisteddfod. He became a Presbyterian minister in 1950, and his first pastorate was at Moreia Chapel in Llanfair Caereinion. He translated the Gospel of Matthew into Welsh as Efengyl Mathew - trosiad i gymraeg diweddar, which was published in Caernarfon in 1961.

== Achievements ==
He made his debut as a novelist in 1953 with Cysgod y Cryman (translated into English as Shadow of the Sickle), which would, in 1999, be chosen as the most significant Welsh language book of the 20th century.As a novelist Elis showed a great willingness to try out different forms, including popular ones. Cysgod y Cryman was followed by a study of intellectual decadence, Ffenestri tua'r Gwyll (Windows to the Dusk 1955). Yn ôl i Leifior (1956; translated into English as Return to Lleifior) was a sequel to Cysgod y Cryman both set at the fictitious farming location Lleifior. In 1957, the Welsh nationalist party Plaid Cymru published his time-travel story Wythnos yng Nghymru Fydd (A Week in Future Wales), presenting an independent, utopian Wales and a dystopian "Western England" in alternative versions of 2033.

Blas y Cynfyd (A Taste of Prehistory 1958) was followed by the colonial satire Tabyrddau'r Babongo (Drums of the Babongo 1961). He thus pioneered the use of genres unfamiliar to Welsh-speaking readers, provided them with a highly readable prose often set in contemporary settings, and did much to establish the position of the novel as a major genre in Welsh-language literature. For periods he set out to live off his writing, something hardly attempted before in modern Welsh.

Later works included Y Blaned Dirion (The Meek Planet 1968, another science fiction novel), Y Gromlech yn yr Haidd (The Dolmen in the Barley, 1971) and Eira Mawr (Great Snow, 1972). He also wrote a play, pamphlets, hundreds of articles and short stories as well as editing, with Gwyn Jones, Welsh Short Stories for the Oxford University Press (1956). His work has appeared in English, German, Italian and Irish translations. He was a lecturer and reader at the University of Wales, Lampeter between 1975 and 1988.

From his schooldays to the mid-1970s, Elis devoted a vast amount of time to politics. He ran as Plaid Cymru's candidate in Montgomeryshire in the 1959 and 1964 general elections and in a 1962 byelection. The so-called "Elvis Rock" graffito beside the A44 road in Ceredigion was originally written with the word "Ellis" by two of his supporters in the 1962 by-election, and subsequently altered to read "Elvis".

== Legacy ==
In retirement, he received a DLitt from the University of Wales. In 1999 a biography of Elis by T Robin Chapman, published in both Welsh and English, appeared.

In 2021, his novel Wythnos yng Nghymru Fydd that was translated into English by Stephen Morris (in 2019) was published as A Week in Future Wales by Cambria Futura.

In 2026 a one-man play titled "Islwyn" which portrayed his life was staged, it was written by Geraint Lewis, performed by Jonathan Nefydd, and directed by Janet Aethwy.
