= Archdruid =

Head of Gorsedd Cymru

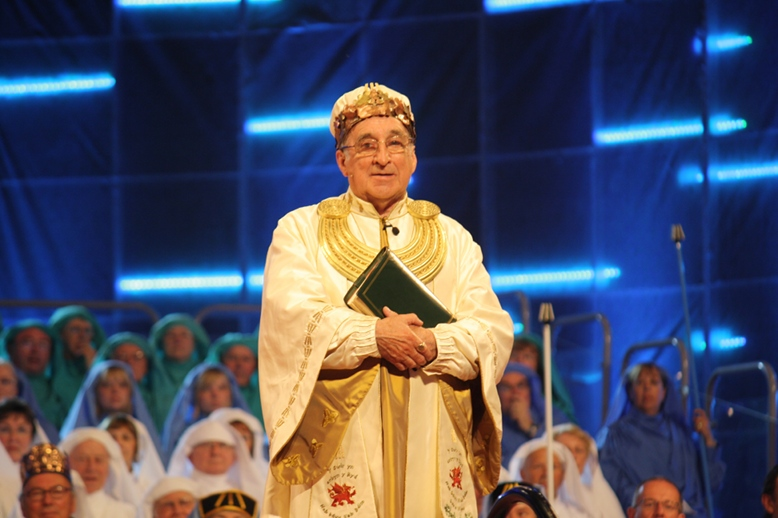
Jim Parc Nest, Archdruid between 2010 and 2013

Archdruid (Welsh: Archdderwydd) is the title used by the presiding official of Gorsedd Cymru. The Archdruid presides over the most important ceremonies at the National Eisteddfod of Wales including the Crowning of the Bard, the award of the Prose Medal and the Chairing of the Bard. Although Iolo Morganwg was the first to preside over the Gorsedd when the National Eisteddfod came into being, his successor David Griffith, under the bardic name "Clwydfardd", was the first to be known by the official title "Archdruid".

The Archdruid's regalia, devised by the early revivers of the eisteddfod during the early 19th century, includes a crown, a sceptre, and a breastplate in the form of a torc. These were redesigned in 1896 by Hubert von Herkomer, to be made of gold and decorated with oak leaves, symbolising the sacred groves associated with druidry. (The Welsh word for "oak" is "derw" from which "druid" is thought to be derived.) A special ring of office was also introduced. The current sceptre has been in use since 1910, and a stola or cape was first worn in 1911 by the Archdruid "Dyfed".

Since 1932, only former winners of the Eisteddfod Crown or chair have been qualified to become Archdruid. By the beginning of the twenty-first century Prose Medal winners were included in this elite band and the first to be elected under this ruling was Robyn Llŷn (Robyn Léwis) (2002–05). Christine James, who became Archdruid in 2013, is both the first woman and the first Welsh learner (i.e. a person not brought up with Welsh as their first language) to have held the title.

Since World War II, only one Archdruid has served more than one three-year term. Albert Evans-Jones ("Cynan"), a World War I veteran and a significant war poet, was elected in 1950 and again in 1963, and was regarded as a reforming influence on the festival; he publicly accepted that the eisteddfod and the gorsedd have no direct descent from Welsh mythology or from the druids. He was knighted in 1969 for his services to Welsh culture, the only Archdruid to have been so honoured.

== List of Archdruids ==
The following is a list of Archdruids.

| Term | Name | Bardic name | Image |
|---|---|---|---|
| 1888 (Note: Clwydfardd claimed "I was appointed Archdruid in the year 1860; but it was in the Wrexham Eisteddfod in the year 1876 that I was licensed as the Archdruid of the Gorsedd of the Bards of the Isle of Britain", but the Gorsedd's website gives 1888.)–1894 | David Griffith | Clwydfardd | |
| 1895–1905 | Rowland Williams | Hwfa Môn | |
| 1905–1923 | Evan Rees | Dyfed | |
| 1923 | John Cadvan Davies | Cadfan | |
| 1924–1928 | Howell Elvet Lewis | Elfed | |
| 1928–1932 | John Owen Williams | Pedrog | |
| 1932–1936 | John Jenkins | Gwili | |
| 1936–1939 | John James Williams | J. J. | |
| 1939–1947 | William Williams | Crwys | |
| 1947–1950 | William Evans | Wil Ifan | |
| 1950–1953 | Sir Albert Evans-Jones | Cynan | |
| 1954–1957 | John Dyfnallt Owen | Dyfnallt | |
| 1957–1960 | William Morris | William Morris | |
| 1960–1962 | Edgar Phillips | Trefin | |
| 1963–1966 | Sir Albert Evans-Jones (second term) | Cynan | |
| 1966–1969 | E. Gwyndaf Evans | Gwyndaf | |
| 1969–1972 | Gwilym Tilsley | Tilsli | |
| 1972–1975 | Brinley Richards | Brinli | |
| 1975–1978 | R. Bryn Williams | Bryn | |
| 1978–1981 | Geraint Bowen | Geraint | |
| 1981–1984 | James Nicholas | Jâms Nicolas | |
| 1984–1987 | W. J. Gruffydd | Elerydd | |
| 1987–1990 | Emrys Roberts | Emrys Deudraeth | |
| 1990–1993 | William R. P. George | Ap Llysor | |
| 1993–1996 | John Gwilym Jones | John Gwilym | |
| 1996-1999 | Dafydd Rowlands | Dafydd Rolant | |
| 1999–2002 | Meirion Evans | Meirion | |
| 2002–2005 | Robyn Léwis | Robin Llŷn | |
| 2005–2008 | Selwyn Griffith | Selwyn Iolen | |
| 2008–2009 | Dic Jones | Dic yr Hendre | |
| 2010–2013 | T. James Jones | Jim Parc Nest | |
| 2013–2016 | Christine James (Note: Christine James was the first female archdruid and the first Welsh learner archdruid.) | Christine | |
| 2016–2019 | Geraint Lloyd Owen | Geraint Llifon | |
| 2019–2024 | Myrddin ap Dafydd | Myrddin ap Dafydd | |
| 2024–2027 | Mererid Hopwood | Mererid | |
