= 2008–09 Chester City F.C. season =

Chester City
2008–09 season
- Manager: Simon Davies; Mark Wright
- Stadium: Deva Stadium
- Football League Two: 23rd (relegated)
- FA Cup: Round 1
- Football League Cup: Round 1
- Football League Trophy: Round 2
- Top goalscorer: League: Ryan Lowe (16); All: Ryan Lowe (18)
- Highest home attendance: 3,349 vs Bournemouth (18 April)
- Lowest home attendance: 1,235 vs Rotherham United (10 March)
- Average home league attendance: 1,972; 22nd in division

The 2008–09 season was the 67th and final season of competitive association football in the Football League played by Chester City, an English club based in Chester, Cheshire.

Also, it was the fifth season spent in the Football League Two, after the promotion from the Football Conference in 2004. Alongside competing in the Football League the club also participated in the FA Cup, the Football League Cup and the Football League Trophy.

== Season summary ==
In 2007–08, Chester finished the season in 22nd place, only one spot above the relegation zone, on just 47 points from the 46 matches. Chester began the 2008–09 season with a squad of only 22 players and a transfer embargo, including youth team players given professional contracts just prior to the season. However, at the start of the campaign it seemed unlikely for City to get relegated, as Rotherham United and A.F.C. Bournemouth had both been deducted 17 points for rules violations before the start of the season, and Luton Town faced a 30-point penalty. A poor start to 2008–09 saw Davies sacked in November 2008 with the club out of all cup competitions and struggling in League Two. Mark Wright returned for his third spell as manager on a non-contract basis. Beset by an ongoing transfer embargo, Chester continued to struggle throughout the remainder of the campaign, and a 2–1 home defeat by Darlington on the final day of the season sealed Chester's demise and a return to non-league football after five years back in The Football League. Two weeks after the final match the club entered administration.

== Football League ==
Pos	Team	Pld	W	D	L	GF	GA	GD	Pts	Promotion, qualification or relegation
20	Macclesfield Town	46	13	8	25	45	77	−32	47	
21	Bournemouth	46	17	12	17	59	51	+8	46 (Note: Bournemouth deducted 17 points for leaving administration without a Company Voluntary Agreement.)	
22	Grimsby Town	46	9	14	23	51	69	−18	41	
23	Chester City (R)	46	8	13	25	43	81	−38	37	Relegated to Conference National
24	Luton Town (R)	46	13	17	16	58	65	−7	26 (Note: Luton Town deducted 30 points; 20 points for leaving administration without a Company Voluntary Agreement, and 10 points for making illegal payments to agents.)	Relegated to Conference National

Source: The Football League
Rules for classification: 1) points; 2) goal difference; 3) number of goals scored.
(R) Relegated

=== Results summary ===
Overall								Home						Away					
Pld	W	D	L	GF	GA	GD	Pts	W	D	L	GF	GA	GD	W	D	L	GF	GA	GD
46	8	13	25	43	81	−38	37	4	7	12	24	34	−10	4	6	13	19	47	−28

Source: rsssf.com

=== Results by matchday ===
Round	1	2	3	4	5	6	7	8	9	10	11	12	13	14	15	16	17	18	19	20	21	22	23	24	25	26	27	28	29	30	31	32	33	34	35	36	37	38	39	40	41	42	43	44	45	46
Result	L	L	L	W	D	W	D	D	L	D	L	L	L	W	L	L	L	W	L	W	D	W	L	D	L	D	L	L	L	L	L	L	D	D	L	L	L	D	D	D	W	L	W	L	D	L
Position	21	21	21	16	18	14	14	13	15	17	18	19	19	17	19	19	19	19	19	19	18	17	18	18	18	18	19	20	20	20	20	20	21	21	21	21	22	22	23	23	23	23	23	23	23	23

Source: 11v11.com
W = Win; D = Draw; L = Loss

=== Matches ===
Date	Opponents	Venue	Result	Score	Scorers	Attendance
9 August	Dagenham & Redbridge	A	L	0–6		1,434
16 August	Wycombe Wanderers	H	L	0–2		1,419
23 August	Rotherham United	A	L	1–3	Ellison	3,462
30 August	Barnet	H	W	5–1	Ellison, Lowe (2), Linwood, Roberts	1,295
6 September	Bury	H	D	1–1	Mozika	2,327
13 September	Grimsby Town	A	W	3–1	Ellison (3)	2,950
21 September	Shrewsbury Town	H	D	1–1	McManus	2,891
27 September	Luton Town	A	D	1–1	McManus	5,731
4 October	Lincoln City	H	L	0–2		1,962
11 October	Chesterfield	A	D	1–1	Linwood	3,042
19 October	Port Vale	H	L	1–2	Lowe	3,102
21 October	Rochdale	A	L	1–6	McArdle (o.g.)	2,162
25 October	Gillingham	A	L	0–2		4,852
28 October	Brentford	H	W	3–0	Lowe (2), Roberts	1,301
1 November	Exeter City	A	L	0–2		4,448
15 November	Morecambe	H	L	1–2	Johnson	1,647
22 November	Aldershot Town	H	L	0–1		1,653
25 November	Darlington	A	W	2–1	Lowe, Kelly	2,416
6 December	AFC Bournemouth	A	L	0–1		4,154
13 December	Notts County	H	W	2–0	Lowe, Roberts	1,767
20 December	Bradford City	A	D	0–0		12,092
26 December	Accrington Stanley	H	W	2–0	Lowe (2)	2,223
28 December	Macclesfield Town	A	L	1–3	Lowe	2,219
13 January	Luton Town	H	D	2–2	Lowe (pen), Ellison	1,652
17 January	Chesterfield	H	L	1–3	Mozika	1,806
24 January	Lincoln City	A	D	1–1	Barry	3,760
27 January	Port Vale	A	L	0–3		4,448
31 January	Gillingham	H	L	0–1		1,541
3 February	Rochdale	H	L	0–2		1,357
7 February	Brentford	A	L	0–3		4,719
14 February	Morecambe	A	L	1–3	Wilson	1,795
17 February	Shrewsbury Town	A	L	0–1		6,133
21 February	Exeter City	H	D	0–0		1,649
28 February	Dagenham & Redbridge	H	D	2–2	Mannix, Roberts	1,416
3 March	Wycombe Wanderers	A	L	0–2		3,713
7 March	Barnet	A	L	1–3	Ellison	2,085
10 March	Rotherham United	H	L	1–5	Ellison	1,235
14 March	Grimsby Town	H	D	1–1	Lowe	2,836
21 March	Bury	A	D	1–1	Lowe	3,049
28 March	Bradford City	H	D	0–0		2,735
4 April	Notts County	A	W	2–1	Mannix, Lowe	4,025
11 April	Macclesfield Town	H	L	0–2		2,248
13 April	Accrington Stanley	A	W	1–0	Lowe (pen)	1,100
18 April	AFC Bournemouth	H	L	0–2		3,349
25 April	Aldershot Town	A	D	2–2	Lowe, Ellams	3,100
2 May	Darlington	H	L	1–2	Miller (o.g.)	1,945

== FA Cup ==
Round	Date	Opponents	Venue	Result	Score	Scorers	Attendance
First round	8 November	Millwall (3)	H	L	0–3		1,932

== Football League Cup ==
Round	Date	Opponents	Venue	Result	Score	Scorers	Attendance
First round	12 August	Leeds United (3)	H	L	2–5	Lowe (2)	3,644

== Football League Trophy ==
Round	Date	Opponents	Venue	Result	Score	Scorers	Attendance
Second round	7 October	Morecambe (4)	H	L	1–1 (p.1–3)	Ellison	926

== Season statistics ==
Nat	Player	Total		League		FA Cup		League Cup		FL Trophy	
Nat	Player	A	G	A	G	A	G	A	G	A	G
Goalkeepers
(England)	John Danby	44	–	41	–	1	–	1	–	1	–
(England)	James Spencer	5	–	5	–	–	–	–	–	–	–
Field players
(England)	Anthony Barry	41+5	1	38+5	1	1	–	1	–	1	–
(Republic of Ireland)	Paul Butler	2	–	1	–	–	–	1	–	–	–
(England)	Tony Dinning	3+1	–	3+1	–	–	–	–	–	–	–
(England)	Lloyd Ellams	2+2	1	2+2	1	–	–	–	–	–	–
(England)	Kevin Ellison	42	9	39	8	1	–	1	–	1	1
(England)	Jay Harris	25+8	–	24+7	–	1	–	0+1	–	–	–
(Northern Ireland)	Mark Hughes	27+1	–	25+1	–	1	–	–	–	1	–
(England)	Eddie Johnson	8+3	1	7+3	1	1	–	–	–	–	–
(Wales)	Ben Jones	2+13	–	2+13	–	–	–	–	–	–	–
(England)	Shaun Kelly	23+5	1	23+4	1	–	–	0+1	–	–	–
(England)	Paul Linwood	46	2	43	2	1	–	1	–	1	–
(England)	Ryan Lowe	47+1	18	45	16	1	–	1	2	0+1	–
(England)	David Mannix	11+3	2	10+3	2	–	–	1	–	–	–
(England)	Paul McManus	7+3	2	6+3	2	–	–	–	–	1	–
(France)	Damien Mozika	24+1	2	21+1	2	1	–	1	–	1	–
(Wales)	James Owen	4+3	–	4+3	–	–	–	–	–	–	–
(Republic of Ireland)	Richie Partridge	17+13	–	15+13	–	–	–	1	–	1	–
(England)	Kristian Platt	0+1	–	0+1	–	–	–	–	–	–	–
(England)	Kevin Roberts	46	4	44	4	1	–	–	–	1	–
(England)	Glenn Rule	18+4	–	18+4	–	–	–	–	–	–	–
(England)	Paul Rutherford	5+15	–	5+14	–	0+1	–	–	–	–	–
(England)	Paul Smith	0+5	–	0+5	–	–	–	–	–	–	–
(England)	Paul Taylor	2+8	–	2+7	–	–	–	–	–	0+1	–
(England)	Stephen Vaughan	7+1	–	7+1	–	–	–	–	–	–	–
(England)	James Vaughan	45	–	42	–	1	–	1	–	1	–
(England)	Laurence Wilson	36+1	1	34	1	0+1	–	1	–	1	–
	Own goals	–	2	–	2	–	–	–	–	–	–
	Total	49	46	46	43	1	–	1	2	1	1
