= 2007–08 Chester City F.C. season =

Chester City
2007–08 season
- Manager: Bobby Williamson; Simon Davies
- Stadium: Deva Stadium
- Football League Two: 22nd
- FA Cup: Round 1
- Football League Cup: Round 1
- Football League Trophy: Round 2
- Top goalscorer: League: Kevin Ellison (11); All: Kevin Ellison (11)
- Highest home attendance: 3,849 vs Wrexham (9 March)
- Lowest home attendance: 1,566 vs Bradford City (12 March)
- Average home league attendance: 2,479; 20th in division

The 2007–08 season was the 66th season of competitive association football in the Football League played by Chester City, an English club based in Chester, Cheshire.

Also, it was the fourth season spent in the Football League Two, after the promotion from the Football Conference in 2004. Alongside competing in the Football League the club also participated in the FA Cup, the Football League Cup and the Football League Trophy.

== Football League ==
| Pos | Team | Pld | W | D | L | GF | GA | GD | Pts | Promotion or relegation |
|---|---|---|---|---|---|---|---|---|---|---|
| 20 | Dagenham & Redbridge | 46 | 13 | 10 | 23 | 49 | 70 | −21 | 49 | |
| 21 | Notts County | 46 | 10 | 18 | 18 | 37 | 53 | −16 | 48 | |
| 22 | Chester City | 46 | 12 | 11 | 23 | 51 | 68 | −17 | 47 | |
| 23 | Mansfield Town (R) | 46 | 11 | 9 | 26 | 48 | 68 | −20 | 42 | Relegation to 2008–09 Conference National |
| 24 | Wrexham (R) | 46 | 10 | 10 | 26 | 38 | 70 | −32 | 40 | Relegation to 2008–09 Conference National |

Updated to match(es) played on 3 May 2008. Source: The Football League
Rules for classification: 1) points; 2) goal difference; 3) number of goals scored.
(R) Relegated

=== Results summary ===
| Overall | | | | | | | | Home | | | | | | Away | | | | | |
| Pld | W | D | L | GF | GA | GD | Pts | W | D | L | GF | GA | GD | W | D | L | GF | GA | GD |
|---|---|---|---|---|---|---|---|---|---|---|---|---|---|---|---|---|---|---|---|
| 46 | 12 | 11 | 23 | 51 | 68 | −17 | 47 | 5 | 5 | 13 | 21 | 30 | −9 | 7 | 6 | 10 | 30 | 38 | −8 |

Source: rsssf.com

=== Results by matchday ===
| Round | 1 | 2 | 3 | 4 | 5 | 6 | 7 | 8 | 9 | 10 | 11 | 12 | 13 | 14 | 15 | 16 | 17 | 18 | 19 | 20 | 21 | 22 | 23 | 24 | 25 | 26 | 27 | 28 | 29 | 30 | 31 | 32 | 33 | 34 | 35 | 36 | 37 | 38 | 39 | 40 | 41 | 42 | 43 | 44 | 45 | 46 |
|---|---|---|---|---|---|---|---|---|---|---|---|---|---|---|---|---|---|---|---|---|---|---|---|---|---|---|---|---|---|---|---|---|---|---|---|---|---|---|---|---|---|---|---|---|---|---|
| Result | D | W | W | D | L | W | L | W | W | W | D | W | D | W | L | L | D | W | L | W | L | L | L | D | L | L | L | L | D | L | L | L | W | L | L | L | L | L | W | L | D | L | L | D | D | D |
| Position | 14 | 4 | 2 | 2 | 4 | 4 | 6 | 5 | 4 | 3 | 3 | 2 | 2 | 2 | 4 | 6 | 7 | 6 | 6 | 6 | 8 | 9 | 10 | 9 | 11 | 12 | 12 | 13 | 15 | 15 | 15 | 16 | 15 | 17 | 17 | 17 | 18 | 19 | 19 | 19 | 20 | 20 | 20 | 22 | 21 | 22 |

Source: 11v11.com
W = Win; D = Draw; L = Loss

=== Matches ===
| Date | Opponents | Venue | Result | Score | Scorers | Attendance |
|---|---|---|---|---|---|---|
| 11 August | Chesterfield | H | D | 0–0 | | 3,183 |
| 18 August | Rochdale | A | W | 2–1 | Grant, Ellison | 3,243 |
| 25 August | Dagenham & Redbridge | H | W | 4–0 | Yeo (2), Murphy (2) | 2,098 |
| 1 September | Rotherham United | A | D | 1–1 | Roberts | 4,036 |
| 7 September | Morecambe | H | L | 0–1 | | 3,199 |
| 15 September | Bury | A | W | 2–0 | Butler, Hughes | 2,539 |
| 22 September | Brentford | H | L | 0–2 | | 2,453 |
| 29 September | Macclesfield Town | A | W | 2–1 | Murphy, Wilson | 2,647 |
| 2 October | Grimsby Town | A | W | 2–1 | Murphy, Ellison | 3,479 |
| 7 October | Shrewsbury Town | H | W | 3–1 | Partridge, Murphy, Yeo | 3,057 |
| 12 October | Hereford United | H | D | 1–1 | Yeo | 3,430 |
| 20 October | Stockport County | A | W | 2–1 | Partridge (2) | 5,566 |
| 27 October | Wycombe Wanderers | H | D | 2–2 | Holroyd, Murphy | 2,598 |
| 2 November | Lincoln City | A | W | 1–0 | Dinning (pen) | 3,960 |
| 6 November | Bradford City | A | L | 1–2 | Ellison | 13,211 |
| 17 November | Milton Keynes Dons | H | L | 0–2 | | 3,102 |
| 25 November | Wrexham | A | D | 2–2 | Roberts, Linwood | 7,687 |
| 4 December | Barnet | H | W | 3–0 | Partridge, Ellison (2) | 1,858 |
| 8 December | Peterborough United | H | L | 1–2 | Hughes | 2,291 |
| 22 December | Bury | H | W | 2–1 | Hughes, Ellison | 2,260 |
| 26 December | Morecambe | A | L | 3–5 | Ellison (2), Holroyd | 3,419 |
| 29 December | Brentford | A | L | 0–3 | | 4,323 |
| 1 January | Grimsby Town | H | L | 0–2 | | 2,255 |
| 5 January | Accrington Stanley | A | D | 3–3 | Holroyd (2), Wilson | 1,311 |
| 12 January | Mansfield Town | H | L | 0–1 | | 2,092 |
| 19 January | Notts County | A | L | 0–1 | | 3,774 |
| 26 January | Rotherham United | H | L | 0–1 | | 2,536 |
| 29 January | Rochdale | H | L | 0–4 | | 2,131 |
| 2 February | Chesterfield | A | D | 1–1 | Murphy | 3,701 |
| 9 February | Accrington Stanley | H | L | 2–3 | Butler, Murphy | 1,957 |
| 12 February | Dagenham & Redbridge | A | L | 2–6 | Roberts, Murphy | 1,328 |
| 16 February | Notts County | H | L | 0–1 | | 1,798 |
| 23 February | Mansfield Town | A | W | 3–1 | Ellison (2), Dinning (pen) | 2,362 |
| 1 March | Milton Keynes Dons | A | L | 0–1 | | 8,172 |
| 4 March | Darlington | A | L | 0–1 | | 3,294 |
| 9 March | Wrexham | H | L | 0–2 | | 3,849 |
| 12 March | Bradford City | H | L | 0–1 | | 1,566 |
| 15 March | Barnet | A | L | 1–3 | Hughes | 1,663 |
| 22 March | Darlington | H | W | 2–1 | Rutherford, Partridge | 1,759 |
| 24 March | Peterborough United | A | L | 0–1 | | 6,457 |
| 5 April | Hereford United | A | D | 2–2 | Sandwith, Ellison (pen) | 3,210 |
| 12 April | Lincoln City | H | L | 1–2 | McManus | 2,089 |
| 19 April | Wycombe Wanderers | A | L | 0–1 | | 5,497 |
| 26 April | Shrewsbury Town | A | D | 0–0 | | 6,417 |
| 29 April | Stockport County | H | D | 0–0 | | 3,060 |
| 3 May | Macclesfield Town | H | D | 0–0 | | 2,396 |

== FA Cup ==
| Round | Date | Opponents | Venue | Result | Score | Scorers | Attendance |
|---|---|---|---|---|---|---|---|
| First round | 10 November | Bradford City (4) | A | L | 0–1 | | 4,069 |

== Football League Cup ==
| Round | Date | Opponents | Venue | Result | Score | Scorers | Attendance |
|---|---|---|---|---|---|---|---|
| First round | 14 August | Nottingham Forest (3) | H | L | 0–0 (p.2–4) | | 2,720 |

== Football League Trophy ==
| Round | Date | Opponents | Venue | Result | Score | Scorers | Attendance |
|---|---|---|---|---|---|---|---|
| First round | 4 September | Crewe Alexandra (3) | H | W | 1–1 (p.4–2) | Partridge | 2,126 |
| Second round | 9 October | Carlisle United (3) | A | L | 2–4 | Partridge, Holroyd | 2,414 |

== Season statistics ==
| Nat | Player | Total | | League | | FA Cup | | League Cup | | FL Trophy | |
| Nat | Player | A | G | A | G | A | G | A | G | A | G |
|---|---|---|---|---|---|---|---|---|---|---|---|
Goalkeepers
| (England) | John Danby | 50 | – | 46 | – | 1 | – | 1 | – | 2 | – |
| (England) | Gavin Ward | 0+1 | – | 0+1 | – | – | – | – | – | – | – |
Field players
| (England) | Phil Bolland | 3 | – | 2 | – | – | – | – | – | 1 | – |
| (Republic of Ireland) | Paul Butler | 38 | 2 | 35 | 2 | 1 | – | 1 | – | 1 | – |
| (England) | Neil Carroll | 1 | – | 1 | – | – | – | – | – | – | – |
| (England) | Tony Dinning | 22 | 2 | 20 | 2 | 1 | – | – | – | 1 | – |
| (England) | Kevin Ellison | 39 | 11 | 36 | 11 | 1 | – | 1 | – | 1 | – |
| (England) | Tony Grant | 18+4 | 1 | 15+4 | 1 | 1 | – | 1 | – | 1 | – |
| (England) | Jamie Hand | 1+1 | – | 0+1 | – | – | – | 1 | – | – | – |
| (England) | Chris Holroyd | 14+13 | 5 | 14+11 | 4 | – | – | 0+1 | – | 0+1 | 1 |
| (Northern Ireland) | Mark Hughes | 43+4 | 4 | 39+4 | 4 | 1 | – | 1 | – | 2 | – |
| (England) | Shaun Kelly | 7+3 | – | 7+3 | – | – | – | – | – | – | – |
| (England) | Craig Lindfield | 5+2 | – | 5+2 | – | – | – | – | – | – | – |
| (England) | Paul Linwood | 46 | 1 | 42 | 1 | 1 | – | 1 | – | 2 | – |
| (England) | Nathan Lowndes | 10+5 | – | 8+4 | – | 1 | – | 1 | – | 0+1 | – |
| (England) | Simon Marples | 18 | – | 16 | – | 1 | – | – | – | 1 | – |
| (England) | Paul McManus | 10+11 | 1 | 9+10 | 1 | 0+1 | – | – | – | 1 | – |
| (England) | Andy Mitchell | 0+4 | – | 0+4 | – | – | – | – | – | – | – |
| (England) | John Murphy | 40 | 9 | 39 | 9 | – | – | – | – | 1 | – |
| (England) | Sean Newton | 2 | – | 2 | – | – | – | – | – | – | – |
| (England) | Phillip Palethorpe | 0+1 | – | 0+1 | – | – | – | – | – | – | – |
| (Republic of Ireland) | Richie Partridge | 36+2 | 7 | 34+2 | 5 | – | – | – | – | 2 | 2 |
| (England) | Kevin Roberts | 30+9 | 3 | 30+7 | 3 | – | – | 0+1 | – | 0+1 | – |
| (England) | Glenn Rule | 2+3 | – | 2+2 | – | – | – | – | – | 0+1 | – |
| (England) | Paul Rutherford | 10+16 | 1 | 10+13 | 1 | 0+1 | – | 0+1 | – | 0+1 | – |
| (England) | Kevin Sandwith | 13+10 | 1 | 12+10 | 1 | – | – | – | – | 1 | – |
| (England) | James Vaughan | 31+1 | – | 29+1 | – | – | – | 1 | – | 1 | – |
| (England) | John Welsh | 6 | – | 6 | – | – | – | – | – | – | – |
| (England) | Laurence Wilson | 44 | 2 | 40 | 2 | 1 | – | 1 | – | 2 | – |
| (England) | Simon Yeo | 11+14 | 4 | 7+14 | 4 | 1 | – | 1 | – | 2 | – |
| | Total | 50 | 54 | 46 | 51 | 1 | – | 1 | – | 2 | 3 |
