= 1992 in Wales =

- Centuries: 18th; 19th; 20th; 21st
- Decades: 1970s; 1980s; 1990s; 2000s; 2010s
- See also: List of years in Wales; Timeline of Welsh history 1992 in The United Kingdom England Scotland Elsewhere

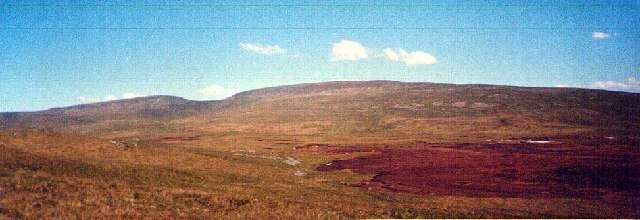
Waun Fignen Felen

This article is about the particular significance of the year 1992 to Wales and its people.

== Incumbents ==
- Secretary of State for Wales – David Hunt
- Archbishop of Wales – Alwyn Rice Jones, Bishop of St Asaph
- Archdruid of the National Eisteddfod of Wales – Ap Llysor

== Events ==
- Wales play England at women's rugby at Cardiff Arms Park for the first time.
- 9 April - In the UK General Election:
  - Long-serving Liberal MP Geraint Howells unexpectedly loses the seat of Ceredigion and Pembroke North to Plaid Cymru. He is elevated to the peerage as Baron Geraint of Ponterwyd.
  - Plaid Cymru's new MP, Cynog Dafis, is helped by an electoral alliance between Plaid and the Wales Green Party.
  - Nick Ainger wins Pembroke for Labour from the Conservatives.
  - Merlyn Rees retires from the House of Commons.
  - Llew Smith replaces the retiring Michael Foot as MP for Blaenau Gwent.
- Following his retirement at the election, Sir Geoffrey Howe becomes a life peer as Lord Howe of Aberavon.
- 13 April - Neil Kinnock resigns after nearly nine years as leader of the Labour Party, having failed for the second successive general election to defeat the Conservative government, although his party has gradually reduced the Conservative majority during that time.
- 1 May-4 October - The Ebbw Vale Garden Festival, the last garden festival held in the UK.
- 6 August - Texaco offers to purchase the entire village of Rhoscrowther which lies immediately adjacent to its Pembroke Refinery.
- 26 August - Five people are killed in a speedboat accident off Llandudno.
- December - One-off stage performance of An Evening with Dylan Thomas takes place to mark the opening of the new AIR Studios.
- date unknown
  - The Passport Office agrees to process passport applications in the Welsh language.
  - The Polytechnic of Wales becomes the University of Glamorgan.
  - The Chwarae Teg organisation is launched to improve work opportunities for women in Wales by assisting with childcare.
  - The Swansea Barrage is constructed on the River Tawe estuary.

== Arts and literature ==
- A full-time officer for Welsh learners is appointed by the National Eisteddfod of Wales.
- The periodical Y Faner ceases publication.
- Michael Sheen co-stars with Vanessa Redgrave in When She Danced in the West End.
- Sesiwn Fawr Dolgellau is established.

=== Awards ===
- National Eisteddfod of Wales (held in Aberystwyth)
- National Eisteddfod of Wales: Chair - Idris Reynolds, "A Fo Ben"
- National Eisteddfod of Wales: Crown - Cyril Jones
- National Eisteddfod of Wales: Prose Medal - Robin Llywelyn, Seren Wen Ar Gefndir Gwyn
- Gwobr Goffa Daniel Owen - withheld
- Wales Book of the Year:
  - English language: Emyr Humphreys - Bonds of Attachment
  - Welsh language: Gerallt Lloyd Owen - Cilmeri

=== New books ===
==== Welsh language ====
- Bedwyr Lewis Jones - Yn Ei Elfen
- Christopher Meredith - Griffri
- Gerallt Lloyd Owen - Cilmeri
- Ifor Rees - Bro a Bywyd:13. Aneirin Talfan Davies 1909-1980
- M. Wynn Thomas - Morgan Llwyd, ei Gyfeillion a'i Gyfnod
- Angharad Tomos - Si Hei Lwli

=== Music ===
- Michael Ball competes for the UK in the Eurovision Song Contest, finishing second.
- Stereophonics formed in Cwmaman.
- Manic Street Preachers - Generation Terrorists (album)
- Y Cyrff - Mae Ddoe Yn Ddoe (album)

== Film ==
- Anthony Hopkins wins the Academy Award for Best Actor for his performance in The Silence of the Lambs.
- Hopkins and Paul Rhys are among the stars of Chaplin.
- Rebecca's Daughters, based on a 1948 screenplay by Dylan Thomas, is filmed in Wales and directed by Karl Francis. Stars include Paul Rhys and Keith Allen.

=== Welsh-language films ===
- Gadael Lenin
- Hedd Wyn, wins the Royal Television Society's Award for Best Single Drama, BAFTA Cymru Awards in several categories and is the first Welsh language film nominated for an Academy Award.

== Broadcasting ==
- The first community radio stations in Wales are approved by the Radio Authority: Radio Ceredigion at Aberystwyth and Radio Maldwyn at Newtown.

=== Welsh-language television ===
- Merched Lasarus (comedy)

== Sport ==
- Athletics - Tanni Grey wins four gold medals at the Paralympics in Barcelona, and is named Sunday Times Sportswoman of the Year.
- BBC Wales Sports Personality of the Year – Tanni Grey
- Boxing
  - 13 October - Neil Haddock wins the British Super Featherweight boxing championship.
  - 14 November - Robbie Regan wins the European Flyweight boxing championship.
  - 12 December - Nicky Piper loses the World Super Middleweight Boxing title fight in London.
- Horse racing - Carl Llewellyn wins the Grand National on "Party Politics"
- Football - The League of Wales is launched.

== Births ==
- 13 January - Adam Matthews, footballer
- 12 February - Dafydd Carter, footballer
- 14 February - Jack Jones, alternative rock singer-songwriter
- 23 February - Daniel Alfei, footballer
- 23 March - Morgan Evans, rugby league player
- 12 April - The Vivienne (James Lee Williams), drag queen (died 2025)
- 13 May - Joe Walsh, footballer
- 27 May - Demi Holborn, singer
- 10 June - Lee Lucas, footballer
- 24 June - Sam Harrison, racing cyclist
- 5 July - Dan Baker, rugby union player
- 7 July - Ben Jones, footballer
- 19 July - Aled Davies, rugby union player
- 25 July - Jonathan Evans, rugby union player
- 12 October - Kyron Duke, powerlifter and field athlete

== Deaths ==
- 27 January - Gwen Ffrangcon-Davies, actress, 101
- 4 February - Alan Davies, footballer, 30
- February - Alexander Tudor-Hart, doctor and political activist, 90
- 17 February - Curigwen Lewis, actress, 86
- 22 February - David Davies, rugby league player, 89
- 11 March - Archie Hughes, footballer, 73
- 18 March
  - Gruffydd Evans, Baron Evans of Claughton, solicitor and politician, 64
  - Jack Kelsey, footballer, 62
- 30 March - Alun Williams, radio and TV presenter, 81
- 6 April - Hywel Lewis, philosopher, 81
- 28 April - Elfed Davies, Baron Davies of Penrhys, politician, 78
- 27 June - Ivor Davies, Archdeacon of Lewisham, 74
- 14 July - Gwyn Davies, dual-code rugby player, 84
- 19 July - Gareth Price, rugby league player, 74
- 22 August - David Tecwyn Lloyd, author, 77
- 28 or 29 August - Bedwyr Lewis Jones, writer and scholar, 58
- 6 September - Mervyn Johns, actor, 93
- 8 September - Edward Roderick Davies, industrialist, 77
- 16 September - Roderick Jones, opera singer, 82
- 19 September - Sir Geraint Evans, opera singer, 70
- October - Wilf Jones, cricketer, 80
- 20 October - Brian Badcoe, actor
- 30 October - Joe Price, cricketer, 64
- 21 November - Irwyn Ranald Walters, musician, 89
- 23 December - Cyril Walters, cricketer, 87
- 26 December - Edmund Davies, Baron Edmund-Davies, judge, 86
- date unknown - John Weston Thomas, harp builder, 81

== See also ==
- 1992 in Northern Ireland
