= Andy Mitchell (footballer, born 1990) =

English footballer

Personal information
- Date of birth: 18 April 1990 (age 36)
- Place of birth: Liverpool, England
- Position: Winger

Youth career
- 2006–2008: Chester City

Senior career*
Years	Team	Apps	(Gls)
2008–2009	Chester City	4	(0)
2009	Bangor City	10	(0)
2009–2010	Airbus UK Broughton	11	(0)
- * Club domestic league appearances and goals as of 20:13 UTC, 10 July 2010

Andy Mitchell (born 18 April 1990) is an English footballer who is a winger. He made four appearances in The Football League for Chester City.

== Career ==
A product of Chester's youth policy, 17-year-old Mitchell made his Football League debut as a substitute for Paul Rutherford when Chester visited Darlington on 4 March 2008, under new manager Simon Davies. He went on to appear in three more league matches before the season ended. Mitchell followed fellow youngsters such as Neil Carroll, Paul McManus, Sean Newton and Kevin Roberts in making his senior debut that season for the club.

He failed to make any more league appearances for Chester and was transferred to Bangor City on 2 February 2009 to along with McManus. The pair spent the remainder of the season at the club before joining Airbus UK Broughton. He no longer plays football for the club.
