= Kevin Roberts (footballer, born 1989) =

English professional footballer

Personal information
- Full name: Kevin Roberts
- Date of birth: 17 August 1989 (age 37)
- Place of birth: Liverpool, England
- Height: 5 ft 9 in (1.74 m)
- Positions: Defender; midfielder

Youth career
- 2003–2007: Chester City

Senior career*
Years	Team	Apps	(Gls)
2007–2010	Chester City	109	(9)
2010–2014	Cambridge United	128	(3)
2013	→ Brackley Town (loan)	4	(0)
2014–2017	FC Halifax Town	103	(2)
2017–2019	Wrexham	72	(0)
2019–2026	Chester	201	(8)
Total		617	(22)
- * Club domestic league appearances and goals as of 09:27, 8 March 2026 (UTC)

Kevin Roberts (born 17 August 1989) is an English former professional footballer who played as a defender.

== Early life ==
Roberts was born in Liverpool, Merseyside.

== Career ==
=== Chester City ===
Roberts started his career in Chester City's youth system in 2003, signing a professional contract in January 2007. His first involvement in the first team came as an unused substitute in a 2–0 away defeat to Lincoln City on 5 May 2007. He made his first-team debut as a substitute against Nottingham Forest in the League Cup first round tie on 14 August 2007 at home. After the match ended goalless, Roberts stepped up to take a penalty in the shoot-out but saw his effort saved as Chester went out 4–2 on penalties. Four days later he made his Football League debut in a 2–1 win at Rochdale, when he played the whole match.

Roberts' rise to prominence continued on 1 September 2007, when he came off the bench to score Chester's equaliser in a 1–1 draw at Rotherham United. His next goal enhanced his reputation further, as he scored a stunning volley in Chester's 2–2 derby draw with Wrexham on 25 November 2007. He went on to play regularly in the team for the remainder of the campaign, with several youth team contemporaries such as Paul McManus, Shaun Kelly and Glenn Rule joining him in the team. The following season again brought a regular starting place in the team in a defensive position, in a campaign that ended in relegation from League Two.

He remained with the club as they began the following season in the Conference Premier. All Chester City players' statistics for the 2009/10 season were expunged after Chester were expelled from the Conference Premier for breaking league regulations.

=== Cambridge United ===
Roberts joined Cambridge United in February 2010 after his contract with Chester was terminated, signing a contract until the end of the season.

Roberts signed a one-year contract extension at Cambridge United during the summer of 2010. Following a difficult season in which Cambridge battled relegation, Martin Ling was sacked and replaced by new manager Jez George, who signed Roberts to a further years contract for the 2011/12 season and reaffirmed his place as the club's first choice right back. Following a barren first 18 months at the club, Roberts scored his first goal for Cambridge in the club's 3–0 home victory against Southport, going on to add another two goals in his next three appearances.

On 4 October 2013, Roberts joined Conference North club Brackley Town on a one-month loan. He was released by Cambridge on 27 May 2014.

=== FC Halifax Town ===
He signed for Conference Premier club FC Halifax Town on 1 July 2014.

=== Wrexham ===
On 20 July 2017, Roberts signed for National League club Wrexham on a two-year contract for an undisclosed fee. He was released on 8 May 2019.

=== Chester ===
On 24 May 2019, Roberts signed for National League North club Chester on a one-year deal.

It was announced on 13 February 2026 that Roberts would retire from professional football after Chester’s game against Darlington, after spending 6 and a half years at the club. He is set to join EFL club Tranmere Rovers as a full-time physiotherapist.

== Career statistics ==
As of match played 3 March 2026

Appearances and goals by club, season and competition
Club	Season	League			FA Cup		League Cup		Other		Total	
Club	Season	Division	Apps	Goals	Apps	Goals	Apps	Goals	Apps	Goals	Apps	Goals
Chester City	2006–07	League Two	0	0	0	0	0	0	0	0	0	0
Chester City	2007–08	League Two	37	3	0	0	1	0	1 (Note: Appearance(s) in Football League Trophy)	0	39	3
Chester City	2008–09	League Two	44	4	1	0	0	0	1	0	46	4
Chester City	2009–10	Conference Premier	28	2	2	0	—		0	0	30	2
Chester City	Total		109	9	3	0	1	0	2	0	115	9
Cambridge United	2009–10	Conference Premier	6	0	—		—		0	0	6	0
Cambridge United	2010–11	Conference Premier	38	0	3	0	—		3 (Note: Appearance(s) in FA Trophy)	1	44	1
Cambridge United	2011–12	Conference Premier	40	3	3	0	—		4	1	47	4
Cambridge United	2012–13	Conference Premier	28	0	0	0	—		2	0	30	0
Cambridge United	2013–14	Conference Premier	16	0	1	0	—		10 (Note: Seven appearances in FA Trophy, three appearances in Conference Premier play-offs)	0	27	0
Cambridge United	Total		128	3	7	0	—		19	2	154	5
Brackley Town (loan)	2013–14	Conference North	4	0	—		—		0	0	4	0
FC Halifax Town	2014–15	Conference Premier	24	0	3	0	—		4	0	31	0
FC Halifax Town	2015–16	National League	39	0	3	0	—		7	0	49	0
FC Halifax Town	2016–17	National League North	40	2	5	0	—		3 (Note: Appearances in National League North play-offs)	1	48	3
FC Halifax Town	Total		103	2	11	0	—		14	1	128	3
Wrexham	2017–18	National League	39	0	0	0	—		1	0	40	0
Wrexham	2018–19	National League	33	0	4	0	—		2 (Note: One appearance in FA Trophy, one appearance in National League play-offs)	0	39	0
Wrexham	Total		72	0	4	0	—		3	0	79	0
Chester	2019–20	National League North	28	1	0	0	—		4 (Note: Three appearances in FA Trophy, one appearance in National League North play-offs)	0	32	1
Chester	2020–21	National League North	15	1	2	0	—		2	0	19	1
Chester	2021–22	National League North	33	4	3	0	—		2 (Note: One appearance in FA Trophy, one appearance in Cheshire Senior Cup)	0	38	4
Chester	2022–23	National League North	34	0	5	1	—		1	0	40	1
Chester	2023–24	National League North	34	0	4	0	—		1	0	39	0
Chester	2024–25	National League North	36	0	4	0	—		3 (Note: Three appearances in National League North play-offs)	0	43	0
Chester	2025–26	National League North	21	2	5	0	—		1	0	27	2
Chester	Total		201	8	23	1	—		14	0	238	9
Career total			617	22	48	1	1	0	52	3	718	26

== Honours ==
Cambridge United

- Conference Premier play-offs: 2013–14
- FA Trophy: 2013–14

FC Halifax Town

- National League North play-offs: 2016–17
- FA Trophy: 2015–16
