= 2010–11 Bury F.C. season =

Bury F.C.
2010–11 season
- Chairman: Brian Fenton
- Manager: Alan Knill (until 31 March); Richie Barker (caretaker)
- Stadium: Gigg Lane
- Football League Two: 2nd (promoted)
- FA Cup: Second round (eliminated by Peterborough United)
- League Cup: First round (eliminated by Sheffield Wednesday)
- Football League Trophy: Second round (eliminated by Tranmere Rovers)
- Top goalscorer: League: Ryan Lowe (27); All: Ryan Lowe (28)
- Highest home attendance: 6,238 vs. Wycombe Wanderers, 30 April 2011
- Lowest home attendance: 1,944 vs. Shrewsbury Town, 5 October 2010
- Average home league attendance: 3,313

During the 2010–11 season, Bury competed in the fourth tier of English football, Football League Two.

== Players ==
=== First-team squad ===
Includes all players who were awarded squad numbers during the season.

Note: Flags indicate national team as defined under FIFA eligibility rules; some limited exceptions apply. Players may hold more than one non-FIFA nationality.

| No. | Pos. | Nation | Player |
|---|---|---|---|
| 1 | GK | ENG | Cameron Belford |
| 2 | DF | ENG | Phil Picken |
| 3 | DF | ENG | Joe Skarz |
| 4 | DF | ENG | Tom Lees |
| 5 | DF | ENG | Ben Futcher |
| 6 | MF | SCO | Peter Sweeney |
| 7 | MF | ENG | David Worrall |
| 8 | MF | ENG | Steven Schumacher (captain) |
| 9 | FW | ENG | Danny Carlton (until Jan 2011) |
| 10 | FW | ENG | Andy Bishop |
| 11 | MF | ENG | Andy Haworth |
| 12 | FW | ENG | Lenell John-Lewis |
| 13 | GK | WAL | Owain Fôn Williams (from Oct 2010 to Jan 2011) |
| 14 | MF | ENG | Mike Jones |
| 15 | FW | ENG | Ryan Lowe |

| No. | Pos. | Nation | Player |
|---|---|---|---|
| 16 | DF | NGR | Efe Sodje |
| 17 | MF | ENG | Kyle Bennett |
| 18 | DF | EIR | Gavin Gunning (from Nov 2010 to Jan 2011) |
| 18 | FW | ENG | Chris Holroyd (Mar 2011 only) |
| 19 | MF | FRA | Damien Mozika |
| 20 | GK | IRL | Ritchie Branagan |
| 21 | MF | ENG | Andrai Jones |
| 22 | MF | ENG | Zach Rothwell |
| 23 | MF | ENG | Krishnan Patel |
| 25 | MF | ENG | Nicky Ajose (from Sep 2010) |
| 26 | MF | ENG | James Wallace (from Nov to Dec 2010) |
| 26 | FW | ENG | Luke McCarthy |
| 27 | DF | ENG | Richard Eckersley (from Mar to Apr 2011) |
| 29 | MF | ENG | Max Harrop |
| 30 | GK | ENG | Neil Cutler (until Mar 2011) |

== Results ==
=== Pre-season ===
| 10 July 2010 | Bury | 0–3 | Burnley | Bury |
| 15:00 | | | Wallace 34'; Thompson 45'; Eagles 81' | Stadium: Gigg Lane; Attendance: 2986 |

| 13 July 2010 | Radcliffe Borough | 1–0 | Bury | Stainton Park |
| 19:45 | Brooks 48' | | | Attendance: ? |

| 17 July 2010 | Bury | 1–1 | Huddersfield Town | Bury |
| 15:00 | Bishop 28' | | Carey 10' | Stadium: Gigg Lane; Attendance: 1704 |

| 21 July 2010 | Bury | 4–0 | Leeds United | Bury |
| 19:45 | Lowe 34'; Bishop 63', 89' (pen.); Carlton 83' | | | Stadium: Gigg Lane; Attendance: 2769 |

| 27 July 2010 | Bury | 3–0 | Rochdale | Bury |
| 19:45 | Haworth 18'; Bishop 34'; Jones 84' | | | Stadium: Gigg Lane; Attendance: 1585 |

| 29 July 2010 | Ramsbottom United | 1–2 | Bury | Riverside Stadium |
| 15:00 | Dean 79' | | Hudson 71'; Boswell 87' | Attendance: ? |

| 31 July 2010 | Southport | 2–2 | Bury | Haig Avenue |
| 15:00 | Early 35'; Gray 70' | | Skarz 44'; Lee 61' (o.g.) | Attendance: ? |

=== League Two ===
| 7 August 2010 1 | Bury | 0–1 | Port Vale | Bury |
| 15:00 BST | | | Collins 66' | Stadium: Gigg Lane; Attendance: 4,681 |

| 14 August 2010 2 | Oxford United | 1–2 | Bury | Oxford |
| 15:00 BST | Midson 31' | | Lees 26'; Lowe 79' | Stadium: Kassam Stadium; Attendance: 7,552 |

| 21 August 2010 3 | Bury | 1–1 | Northampton Town | Bury |
| 15:00 BST | Worrall 69' | | Guinan 33' (pen.) | Stadium: Gigg Lane; Attendance: 2,845 |

| 28 August 2010 4 | Barnet | 1–1 | Bury | High Barnet, London |
| 15:00 BST | Marshall 75' | | Lowe 56' | Stadium: Underhill Stadium; Attendance: 1,563 |

| 4 September 2010 5 | Bury | 5–4 | Gillingham | Bury |
| 15:00 BST | Bishop 15', 50'; Lowe 34' (pen.), 73'; Sodje 62' | | Akinfenwa 47', 58'; Spiller 59'; Palmer 66' | Stadium: Gigg Lane; Attendance: 2,700 |

| 11 September 2010 6 | Crewe Alexandra | 3–0 | Bury | Crewe |
| 15:00 BST | Miller 3'; Artell 18'; Murphy 71' | | Schumacher (red card) 63' | Stadium: Gresty Road; Attendance: 4,030 |

| 18 September 2010 7 | Bury | 1–1 | Hereford United | Bury |
| 15:00 BST | Lowe 90' | | Bauzà 46' (pen.); Lunt (red card) 72' | Stadium: Gigg Lane; Attendance: 2,753 |

| 25 September 2010 8 | Cheltenham Town | 0–2 | Bury | Cheltenham |
| 15:00 BST | | | Lowe 11' (pen.); M. Jones 85' | Stadium: Whaddon Road; Attendance: 2,758 |

| 28 September 2010 9 | Morecambe | 1–4 | Bury | Morecambe |
| 19:45 BST | Drummond 45' | | M. Jones 3'; Schumacher 21', 89'; Haworth 78' | Stadium: Globe Arena; Attendance: 2,607 |

| 2 October 2010 10 | Bury | 1–1 | Rotherham United | Bury |
| 15:00 BST | Lowe 41' | | Le Fondre 47' | Stadium: Gigg Lane; Attendance: 3,788 |

| 9 October 2010 11 | Bury | 3–0 | Accrington Stanley | Bury |
| 15:00 BST | Lowe 13', 45'; Ajose 57' | | Procter (red card) 75'; Bateson (red card) 82' | Stadium: Gigg Lane; Attendance: 4,164 |

| 16 October 2010 12 | Torquay United | 3–4 | Bury | Torquay |
| 15:00 BST | Robertson 18'; Zebroski 20', 56' | | Lowe 27' (pen.); Ajose 33'; Schumacher 51'; M. Jones 71' | Stadium: Plainmoor; Attendance: 2,553 |

| 23 October 2010 13 | Bury | 1–0 | Southend United | Bury |
| 15:00 BST | Skarz 41' | | | Stadium: Gigg Lane; Attendance: 3,531 |

| 30 October 2010 14 | Aldershot Town | 1–3 | Bury | Aldershot |
| 15:00 BST | Little 11'; Jones (red card) 22'; M. Morgan (red card) 68' | | M. Jones 44', 66'; Ajose 77' | Stadium: Recreation Ground; Attendance: 2,526 |

| 2 November 2010 15 | Bury | 0–1 | Bradford City | Bury |
| 19:45 GMT | | | Daley 30' (pen.) | Stadium: Gigg Lane; Attendance: 3,521 |

| 13 November 2010 16 | Bury | 0–1 | Stockport County | Bury |
| 15:00 GMT | | | Fletcher 15' | Stadium: Gigg Lane; Attendance: 4,244 |

| 19 November 2010 17 | Burton Albion | 1–3 | Bury | Burton upon Trent |
| 19:45 GMT | Collins 29' | | M. Jones 10'; Ajose 53'; Sodje 73' | Stadium: Pirelli Stadium; Attendance: 2,738 |

| 23 November 2010 18 | Lincoln City | 0–5 | Bury | Lincoln |
| 19:45 GMT | | | Haworth 10'; Ajose 21', 71'; Lowe 23', 90' | Stadium: Sincil Bank; Attendance: 3,659 |

| 11 December 2010 19 | Wycombe Wanderers | 1–0 | Bury | High Wycombe |
| 15:00 GMT | Rendell 69' | | | Stadium: Adams Park; Attendance: 3,673 |

| 1 January 2011 20 | Bury | 2–2 | Macclesfield Town | Bury |
| 15:00 GMT | Lowe 83'; John-Lewis 89' | | Butcher 29'; Gray 69' | Stadium: Gigg Lane; Attendance: 2,860 |

| 3 January 2011 21 | Bradford City | 1–0 | Bury | Bradford |
| 15:00 GMT | Daley 45' | | | Stadium: Valley Parade; Attendance: 11,384 |

| 8 January 2011 22 | Accrington Stanley | 1–0 | Bury | Accrington |
| 15:00 GMT | Jacobson 77' | | | Stadium: Crown Ground; Attendance: 2,481 |

| 15 January 2011 23 | Bury | 1–1 | Aldershot Town | Bury |
| 15:00 GMT | Schumacher 71' | | Guttridge 9' | Stadium: Gigg Lane; Attendance: 2,537 |

| 21 January 2011 24 | Southend United | 1–1 | Bury | Southend-on-Sea |
| 19:45 GMT | Mohsni 90' | | Mozika 65' | Stadium: Roots Hall; Attendance: 5,175 |

| 28 January 2011 25 | Bury | 1–0 | Shrewsbury Town | Bury |
| 19:45 GMT | Lowe 39' | | | Stadium: Gigg Lane |

| 1 February 2011 26 | Macclesfield Town | 2–4 | Bury | Macclesfield |
| 19:45 GMT | Draper 37'; Barnett 39' | | M. Jones 8'; Lowe 33', 86'; Ajose 36' | Stadium: Moss Rose; Attendance: 1,267 |

| 8 February 2011 27 | Bury | 3–0 | Stevenage | Bury |
| 19:45 GMT | Bishop 8'; Sodje 61'; Lowe 70' | | | Stadium: Gigg Lane; Attendance: 2,080 |

| 12 February 2011 28 | Stockport County | 2–1 | Bury | Edgeley, Stockport |
| 15:00 GMT | Paterson 66'; Elding 84' | | Lowe 88' | Stadium: Edgeley Park; Attendance: 4,903 |

| 15 February 2011 29 | Bury | 1–1 | Chesterfield | Bury |
| 19:45 GMT | Lowe 46' | | Davies 20'; Smalley (red card) 85' | Stadium: Gigg Lane; Attendance: 2,517 |

| 19 February 2011 30 | Gillingham | 1–1 | Bury | Gillingham |
| 15:00 GMT | Weston 25' | | Lowe 72' | Stadium: Priestfield Stadium; Attendance: 5,021 |

| 26 February 2011 31 | Bury | 3–1 | Crewe Alexandra | Bury |
| 15:00 GMT | Bennett 64', 68'; Lowe 76' | | Miller 41' | Stadium: Gigg Lane; Attendance: 3,308 |

| 1 March 2011 32 | Shrewsbury Town | 0–3 | Bury | Shrewsbury |
| 19:45 GMT | | | Bishop 21'; Lowe 53'; Schumacher 80' | Stadium: New Meadow; Attendance: 5,298 |

| 5 March 2011 33 | Hereford United | 0–3 | Bury | Hereford |
| 15:00 GMT | | | Schumacher 3', 51'; Lowe 86' | Stadium: Edgar Street; Attendance: 2,650 |

| 8 March 2011 34 | Bury | 1–0 | Morecambe | Bury |
| 19:45 GMT | John-Lewis 85' | | | Stadium: Gigg Lane; Attendance: 2,480 |

| 12 March 2011 35 | Rotherham United | 0–0 | Bury | Sheffield |
| 15:00 GMT | | | | Stadium: Don Valley Stadium; Attendance: 4,620 |

| 15 March 2011 36 | Bury | 1–2 | Torquay United | Bury |
| 19:45 GMT | Holroyd 4' | | Stanley 61'; Zebroski 70' | Stadium: Gigg Lane; Attendance: 2,747 |

| 19 March 2011 37 | Bury | 2–3 | Cheltenham Town | Bury |
| 15:00 GMT | Futcher 9'; Haworth 68' | | Gallinagh 3'; Low 7', 68' | Stadium: Gigg Lane; Attendance: 2,870 |

| 26 March 2011 38 | Port Vale | 0–0 | Bury | Burslem, Stoke-on-Trent |
| 15:00 GMT | | | Schumacher (red card) 76' | Stadium: Vale Park; Attendance: 5,510 |

| 2 April 2011 39 | Bury | 3–0 | Oxford United | Bury |
| 15:00 BST | Ajose 1', 70'; Lowe 63' | | | Stadium: Gigg Lane; Attendance: 3,515 |

| 9 April 2011 40 | Northampton Town | 2–4 | Bury | Sixfields, Northampton |
| 15:00 BST | Harrad 59', 90+1' | | Lowe 24'; Ajose 28', 57'; Mozika 42' | Stadium: Sixfields Stadium; Attendance: 5,077 |

| 12 April 2011 41 | Bury | 1–0 | Burton Albion | Bury |
| 19:45 BST | Lees 77'; Mozika (red card) 45+2'; Sodje (red card) 87' | | Winnall (red card) 62' | Stadium: Gigg Lane; Attendance: 2,580 |

| 16 April 2011 42 | Bury | 2–0 | Barnet | Bury |
| 15:00 BST | Ajose 16'; M. Jones 21' | | | Stadium: Gigg Lane; Attendance: 3,082 |

| 22 April 2011 43 | Bury | 1–0 | Lincoln City | Bury |
| 15:00 BST | Lees 56' | | | Stadium: Gigg Lane; Attendance: 4,248 |

| 25 April 2011 44 | Chesterfield | 2–3 | Bury | Chesterfield |
| 15:00 BST | Davies 50'; Lester 63' | | Lees 12'; Worrall 55'; Lowe 87' | Stadium: B2net Stadium; Attendance: 9,614 |

| 30 April 2011 45 | Bury | 1–3 | Wycombe Wanderers | Bury |
| 15:00 BST | Lowe 10' (pen.) | | Ainsworth 20'; Strevens 63', 88' | Stadium: Gigg Lane; Attendance: 6,238 |

| 7 May 2011 46 | Stevenage | 3–3 | Bury | Stevenage |
| 15:00 BST | Laird 8'; Reid 19'; May 73' | | Schumacher 16', 70'; Ajose 31' | Stadium: Broadhall Way; Attendance: 5,016 |

=== FA Cup ===
| 6 November 2010 Round 1 | Bury | 2–0 | Exeter City | Bury |
| 15:00 | Sodje 28'; Lees 53' | | | Stadium: Gigg Lane; Attendance: 2,359 |

| 27 November 2010 Round 2 | Bury | 1–2 | Peterborough United | Bury |
| 15:00 | Lowe 51' | | Tomlin 13'; Mackail-Smith 38' | Stadium: Gigg Lane; Attendance: 2,514 |

=== League Cup ===
| 10 August 2010 Round 1 | Sheffield Wednesday | 1–0 | Bury | Sheffield |
| 19:45 | Coke 60' | | | Stadium: Hillsborough Stadium; Attendance: 7,390 |

=== Football League Trophy ===
| 5 October 2010 Round 1 | Bury | 0–0 (6–5 p) | Shrewsbury Town | Bury |
| 19:45 | | | | Stadium: Gigg Lane; Attendance: 1,944 |
| | Penalties |
| | Worrall (penalty scored); Bennett (penalty scored); Lowe (penalty scored); Ajose (penalty scored); Futcher (penalty scored); Belford (penalty scored) | | Harrold (penalty scored); McIntyre (penalty scored); McAllister (penalty scored); Leslie (penalty scored); Raven (penalty scored); O'Donnell (penalty missed) |

| 9 November 2010 Round 2 | Bury | 0–1 | Tranmere Rovers | Bury |
| 19:45 | | | Thomas-Moore 8' | Stadium: Gigg Lane; Attendance: 1,961 |

== League data ==
=== League table ===
| Pos | Team | Pld | W | D | L | GF | GA | GD | Pts | Promotion, qualification or relegation |
|---|---|---|---|---|---|---|---|---|---|---|
| 1 | Chesterfield (C, P) | 46 | 24 | 14 | 8 | 85 | 51 | +34 | 86 | Promotion to League One |
| 2 | Bury (P) | 46 | 23 | 12 | 11 | 82 | 50 | +32 | 81 | Promotion to League One |
| 3 | Wycombe Wanderers (P) | 46 | 22 | 14 | 10 | 69 | 50 | +19 | 80 | Promotion to League One |
| 4 | Shrewsbury Town | 46 | 22 | 13 | 11 | 72 | 49 | +23 | 79 | Qualification to League Two play-offs |
| 5 | Accrington Stanley | 46 | 18 | 19 | 9 | 73 | 55 | +18 | 73 | Qualification to League Two play-offs |

Updated to match(es) played on 28 May 2011. Source: The Football League
Rules for classification: 1) points; 2) goal difference; 3) number of goals scored.
(C) Champions; (P) Promoted

=== Results summary ===
| Overall | | | | | | | | Home | | | | | | Away | | | | | |
| Pld | W | D | L | GF | GA | GD | Pts | W | D | L | GF | GA | GD | W | D | L | GF | GA | GD |
|---|---|---|---|---|---|---|---|---|---|---|---|---|---|---|---|---|---|---|---|
| 46 | 23 | 12 | 11 | 82 | 50 | +32 | 81 | 11 | 6 | 6 | 35 | 23 | +12 | 12 | 6 | 5 | 47 | 27 | +20 |

Last updated: 11 May 2011.
Source: BBC Sport

=== Results by round ===
| Round | 1 | 2 | 3 | 4 | 5 | 6 | 7 | 8 | 9 | 10 | 11 | 12 | 13 | 14 | 15 | 16 | 17 | 18 | 19 | 20 | 21 | 22 | 23 | 24 | 25 | 26 | 27 | 28 | 29 | 30 | 31 | 32 | 33 | 34 | 35 | 36 | 37 | 38 | 39 | 40 | 41 | 42 | 43 | 44 | 45 | 46 |
|---|---|---|---|---|---|---|---|---|---|---|---|---|---|---|---|---|---|---|---|---|---|---|---|---|---|---|---|---|---|---|---|---|---|---|---|---|---|---|---|---|---|---|---|---|---|---|
| Ground | H | A | H | A | H | A | H | A | A | H | H | A | H | A | H | H | A | A | A | H | A | A | H | A | H | A | H | H | A | H | A | H | A | H | A | H | H | A | H | A | H | H | H | A | H | A |
| Result | L | W | D | D | W | L | D | W | W | D | W | W | W | W | L | L | W | W | L | D | L | L | D | D | W | W | W | L | D | D | W | W | W | W | D | L | L | D | W | W | W | W | W | W | L | D |
| Position | | | 11 | 12 | 7 | 11 | 11 | 6 | 5 | 5 | 4 | 4 | 3 | 3 | 3 | 5 | 2 | 3 | 3 | 5 | 5 | 6 | 6 | 7 | 5 | 4 | 5 | 5 | 5 | 5 | 5 | 3 | 2 | 2 | 2 | 2 | 2 | 3 | 4 | 3 | 2 | 2 | 2 | 2 | 2 | 2 |

Updated to match(es) played on 20 May 2011. Source: Results
A = Away; H = Home; W = Win; D = Draw; L = Loss

== Appearances and goals ==
As of 6 May 2011.
(Substitute appearances in brackets)

| No. | Pos. | Name | League | | FA Cup | | League Cup | | League Trophy | | Total | | Discipline | |
| No. | Pos. | Name | Apps | Goals | Apps | Goals | Apps | Goals | Apps | Goals | Apps | Goals | Yellow card | Red card |
|---|---|---|---|---|---|---|---|---|---|---|---|---|---|---|
| 1 | GK | (England) Cameron Belford | 39 | 0 | 0 | 0 | 1 | 0 | 1 | 0 | 41 | 0 | 2 | 0 |
| 2 | DF | (England) Phil Picken | 38 | 0 | 2 | 0 | 1 | 0 | 2 | 0 | 44 | 0 | 10 | 0 |
| 3 | DF | (England) Joe Skarz | 46 | 1 | 2 | 0 | 1 | 0 | 2 | 0 | 51 | 1 | 5 | 0 |
| 4 | DF | (England) Tom Lees | 45 | 4 | 2 | 1 | 1 | 0 | 2 | 0 | 50 | 5 | 1 | 0 |
| 5 | DF | (England) Ben Futcher | 6 (5) | 1 | 0 | 0 | 0 | 0 | 2 | 0 | 8 (5) | 1 | 3 | 0 |
| 6 | MF | (Scotland) Peter Sweeney | 18 (7) | 0 | 1 | 0 | 1 | 0 | 2 | 0 | 22 (7) | 0 | 3 | 0 |
| 7 | MF | (England) David Worrall | 27 (13) | 2 | 0 (2) | 0 | 0 (1) | 0 | 0 (1) | 0 | 27 (17) | 2 | 3 | 0 |
| 8 | MF | (England) Steven Schumacher | 42 (1) | 9 | 1 | 0 | 1 | 0 | 1 | 0 | 45 (1) | 9 | 6 | 2 |
| 9 | FW | (England) Danny Carlton | 0 (3) | 0 | 0 (1) | 0 | 0 (1) | 0 | 0 (1) | 0 | 0 (6) | 0 | 0 | 0 |
| 10 | FW | (England) Andy Bishop | 14 (5) | 4 | 0 | 0 | 1 | 0 | 0 | 0 | 15 (15) | 4 | 2 | 0 |
| 11 | MF | (England) Andy Haworth | 20 (20) | 3 | 2 | 0 | 1 | 0 | 2 | 0 | 25 (20) | 3 | 4 | 0 |
| 12 | MF | (England) Lenell John-Lewis | 6 (33) | 2 | 0 (2) | 0 | 0 (1) | 0 | 2 | 0 | 8 (36) | 2 | 1 | 0 |
| 13 | GK | (Wales) Owain Fôn Williams | 6 | 0 | 2 | 0 | 0 | 0 | 0 | 0 | 8 | 0 | 1 | 0 |
| 14 | MF | (England) Mike Jones | 37 (5) | 8 | 2 | 0 | 1 | 0 | 0 | 0 | 40 (5) | 8 | 1 | 0 |
| 15 | FW | (England) Ryan Lowe | 46 | 27 | 2 | 1 | 1 | 0 | 0 (1) | 0 | 49 (1) | 28 | 4 | 0 |
| 16 | DF | (Nigeria) Efe Sodje | 40 | 3 | 2 | 1 | 1 | 0 | 0 | 0 | 43 | 4 | 12 | 1 |
| 17 | MF | (England) Kyle Bennett | 13 (19) | 2 | 0 (1) | 0 | 0 | 0 | 2 | 0 | 15 (20) | 2 | 1 | 0 |
| 18 | DF | (Republic of Ireland) Gavin Gunning | 2 | 0 | 0 | 0 | 0 | 0 | 0 | 0 | 2 | 0 | 0 | 0 |
| 18 | FW | (England) Chris Holroyd | 3 (1) | 1 | 0 | 0 | 0 | 0 | 0 | 0 | 3 (1) | 1 | 0 | 0 |
| 19 | MF | (France) Damien Mozika | 32 (1) | 2 | 1 | 0 | 0 | 0 | 1 | 0 | 34 (1) | 2 | 10 | 1 |
| 20 | GK | (Republic of Ireland) Ritchie Branagan | 1 (1) | 0 | 0 | 0 | 0 | 0 | 1 | 0 | 2 (1) | 0 | 0 | 0 |
| 21 | MF | (England) Andrai Jones | 0 (1) | 0 | 0 | 0 | 0 | 0 | 0 | 0 | 0 (1) | 0 | 0 | 0 |
| 25 | FW | (England) Nicky Ajose | 22 (6) | 13 | 2 | 0 | 0 | 0 | 2 | 0 | 26 (6) | 13 | 0 | 0 |
| 26 | MF | (England) James Wallace | 0 | 0 | 1 | 0 | 0 | 0 | 0 | 0 | 1 | 0 | 1 | 0 |
| 26 | MF | (England) Luke McCarthy | 0 (1) | 0 | 0 | 0 | 0 | 0 | 0 | 0 | 0 (1) | 0 | 0 | 0 |
| 27 | DF | (England) Richard Eckersley | 3 | 0 | 0 | 0 | 0 | 0 | 0 | 0 | 3 | 0 | 0 | 0 |
| 29 | MF | (England) Max Harrop | 0 (3) | 0 | 0 | 0 | 0 | 0 | 0 | 0 | 0 (3) | 0 | 0 | 0 |

== Awards ==
| End of Season Awards | Winner |
|---|---|
| Forever Bury Player of the Season | Ryan Lowe |
| Website Player of the Season | Ryan Lowe |
| Bury Times Player of the Season | Efe Sodje |
| Junior Shakers' Player of the Season | Efe Sodje |
| Disabled supporters' Player of the Season | Ryan Lowe |
| Frank Hoult Players' Player of the Season | Tom Lees |
| Young Player of the Season | Joe Skarz |
| Forever Bury Most Promising Newcomer of the Season | Damien Mozika |
| Youth Team Player of the Season | Max Harrop |
| Goal of the Season | Steven Schumacher (vs Shrewsbury Town, 1 March 2011) |

== Transfers ==
Players transferred in
| Date | Pos. | Name | From | Fee | Ref. |
|---|---|---|---|---|---|
| 25 June 2010 | MF | (Scotland) Peter Sweeney | (England) Grimsby Town | Free | |
| 25 June 2010 | DF | (England) Joe Skarz | (England) Huddersfield Town | Free | |
| 6 July 2010 | MF | (England) Andrew Haworth | (England) Blackburn Rovers | Free | |
| 8 July 2010 | MF | (England) Steven Schumacher | (England) Crewe Alexandra | Free | |
| 3 August 2010 | DF | (England) Phil Picken | (England) Chesterfield | Free | |
| 3 August 2010 | MF | (England) Kyle Bennett | (England) Wolverhampton Wanderers | Free | |
| 5 August 2010 | FW | (England) Lenell John-Lewis | (England) Lincoln City | Free | |
| 19 August 2010 | MF | (France) Damien Mozika | (Iran) Tarbiat Yazd | Free | |
Players loaned in
| Date from | Pos. | Name | From | Date to | Ref. |
| 3 August 2010 | DF | (England) Tom Lees | (England) Leeds United | End of season | |
| 25 September 2010 | FW | (England) Nicky Ajose | (England) Manchester United | End of season | |
| 28 October 2010 | GK | (Wales) Owain Fôn Williams | (England) Stockport County | 4 January 2011 | |
| 12 November 2010 | DF | (Republic of Ireland) Gavin Gunning | (England) Blackburn Rovers | 31 January 2011 | |
| 25 November 2010 | MF | (England) James Wallace | (England) Everton | 31 January 2011 | |
| 11 March 2011 | FW | (England) Chris Holroyd | (England) Brighton & Hove Albion | 11 April 2011 | |
| 14 March 2011 | DF | (England) Richard Eckersley | (England) Burnley | 15 April 2011 | |
Players loaned out
| Date from | Pos. | Name | To | Date to | Ref. |
| 23 September 2010 | FW | (England) Danny Carlton | (England) Grimsby Town | 20 October 2010 | |
| 28 September 2010 | DF | (England) Andrai Jones | (England) Altrincham | 28 October 2010 | |
| 11 November 2010 | DF | (England) Ben Futcher | (England) Oxford United | 4 January 2011 | |
Players transferred out
| Date | Pos. | Name | Subsequent club | Fee | Ref. |
| 18 June 2010 | DF | (England) Ryan Cresswell | (England) Rotherham United | Undisclosed | |
Players released
| Date | Pos. | Name | Subsequent club | Join date | Ref. |
| 7 June 2010 | MF | (Republic of Ireland) Stephen Dawson | (England) Leyton Orient | 1 July 2010 (Bosman) | |
| 15 June 2010 | DF | (England) Paul Scott | (England) Morecambe | 1 July 2010 | |
| 16 June 2010 | MF | (Republic of Ireland) Brian Barry-Murphy | (England) Rochdale | 1 July 2010 (Bosman) | |
| 28 June 2010 | FW | (England) Andy Morrell | (Wales) Wrexham | 1 July 2010 (Bosman) | |
| 28 June 2010 | DF | (England) Tom Newey | (England) Rotherham United | 1 July 2010 (Bosman) | |
| 1 July 2010 | MF | (England) Richie Baker | (England) Oxford United | 1 July 2010 | |
| 1 July 2010 | DF | (Northern Ireland) David Buchanan | (Scotland) Hamilton Academical | 25 July 2010 | |
| 1 July 2010 | GK | (England) Wayne Brown | (South Africa) Supersport United | 27 July 2010 | |
| 1 July 2010 | MF | (England) Damien Allen | (Wales) Colwyn Bay | 28 July 2010 | |
| 1 July 2010 | DF | (England) Danny Racchi | (Wales) Wrexham | 16 August 2010 | |
| 1 July 2010 | MF | (England) Josh Rothwell | Unattached | | |
| 31 January 2011 | FW | (England) Danny Carlton | (England) Morecambe | 15 February 2011 | |
| 31 March 2011 | GK | (England) Neil Cutler | (England) Scunthorpe United | 31 March 2011 (Goalkeeping coach) | |
