= Ryan Lowe =

English footballer (born 1978)

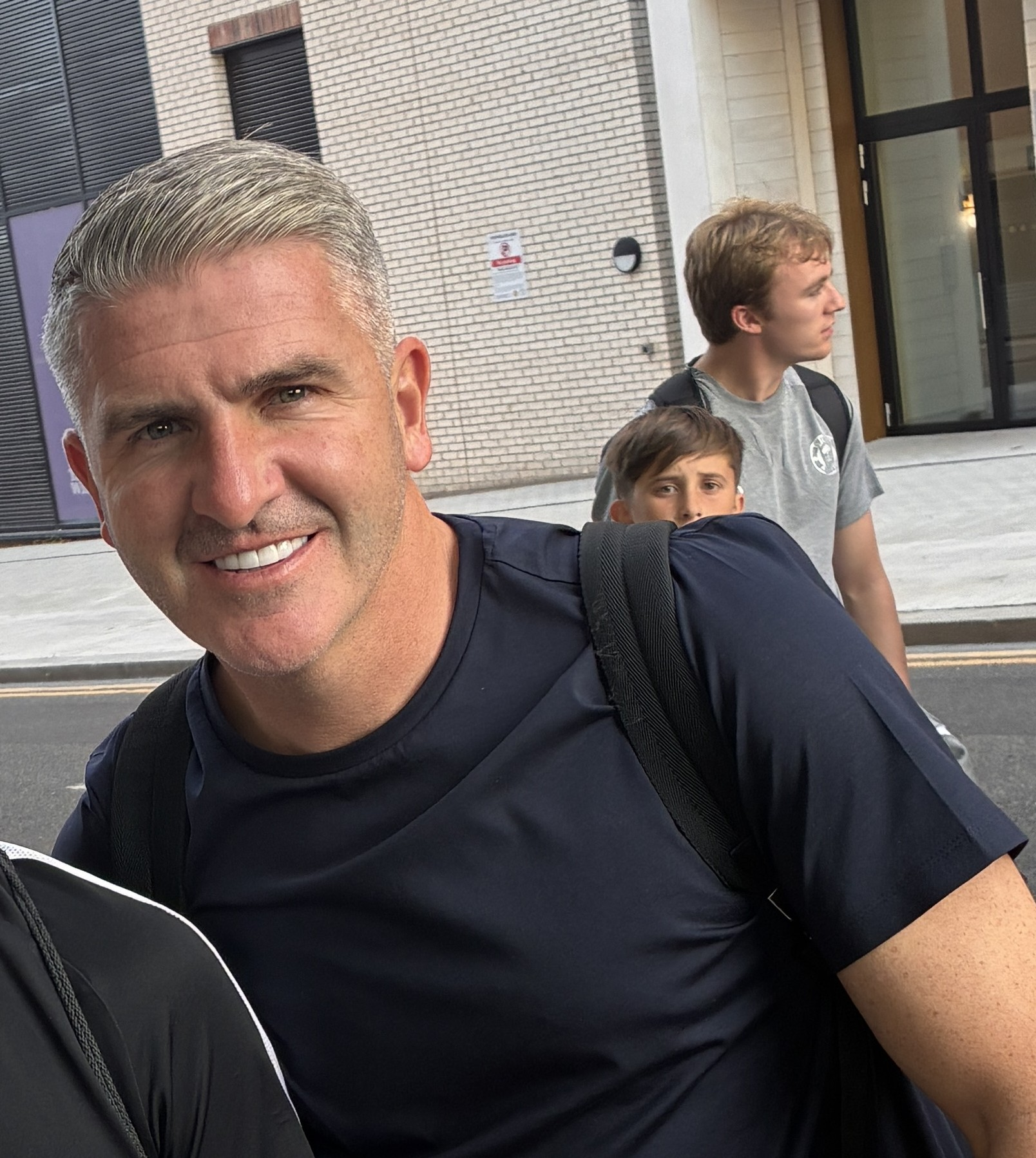
- Lowe with Wigan Athletic in 2025

Personal information
- Full name: Ryan Thomas Lowe
- Date of birth: 18 September 1978 (age 48)
- Place of birth: Liverpool, England
- Height: 5 ft 9 1/2 in (1.77 m)
- Position: Striker

Youth career
- Liverpool
- 1996–1999: Southport

Senior career*
Years	Team	Apps	(Gls)
- Sandon Dock
- Waterloo Dock
1999–2000	Burscough		
2000–2005	Shrewsbury Town	171	(32)
2005–2006	Chester City	40	(14)
2006–2008	Crewe Alexandra	64	(12)
2008	→ Stockport County (loan)	4	(0)
2008–2009	Chester City	45	(16)
2009–2011	Bury	90	(49)
2011–2012	Sheffield Wednesday	26	(8)
2012–2013	Milton Keynes Dons	42	(11)
2013–2014	Tranmere Rovers	45	(19)
2014–2016	Bury	53	(15)
2015–2016	→ Crewe Alexandra (loan)	6	(2)
2016–2017	Crewe Alexandra	22	(5)
2017–2018	Bury	18	(1)
Total		626	(184)

Managerial career
- 2017: Bury (caretaker)
- 2018–2019: Bury
- 2019–2021: Plymouth Argyle
- 2021–2024: Preston North End
- 2025–2026: Wigan Athletic
- * Club domestic league appearances and goals

Ryan Thomas Lowe (born 18 September 1978) is an English professional football coach and former player who was most recently head coach of EFL League One side Wigan Athletic.

Lowe's playing career, as a striker, began at Burscough in 1999 and he became a Football League player with Shrewsbury Town the following year. He played for eight league clubs in all and had three spells at Bury and at Crewe Alexandra. In the second half of the 2010–11 season, Lowe established a Bury club record by scoring a goal in each of nine consecutive league games. Lowe ended his playing career at Bury who had signed him again in January 2017, this time as player-coach. He became caretaker-manager twice in 2017–18 after first Lee Clark and then Chris Lucketti were dismissed. Lowe retired from playing in March 2018 during his second caretaker appointment.

In May 2018, despite their relegation to League Two, Bury offered Lowe the position of full-time manager on a two-year contract to the end of the 2019–20 season. After guiding the club to promotion back to League One, he left Bury on 5 June 2019 to take over at newly relegated Plymouth Argyle, managing them to an immediate return to League One before joining Preston North End in December 2021, staying with them until August 2024. He was appointed as Wigan's head coach in March 2025, and was dismissed in February 2026.

== Early years ==
Born in Liverpool, Merseyside, Lowe played for Liverpool's youth team between 12 and 13, before breaking his ankle. He returned to the team aged 15 before again leaving the club. While at Liverpool, he formed a friendship with Steven Gerrard.

After Liverpool, Lowe played with Southport's youth team and non-league Liverpool teams Sandon Dock and Waterloo Dock before joining Burscough. He moved into the Football League with Shrewsbury Town in time for 2000–01.

== Playing career ==
=== Shrewsbury Town and Chester City ===
After almost five years with the Shrews (which included a season in the Football Conference), Lowe switched to Football League Two side Chester City on 22 March 2005. He spent a year at Chester, which included scoring twice in a shock FA Cup 3–0 win over Nottingham Forest on 3 December 2005 before leaving the club by mutual consent shortly after the return of manager Mark Wright.

=== Crewe Alexandra ===
Lowe joined Football League One side Crewe Alexandra in time for 2006–07 season. He enjoyed a successful debut for the Railwaymen, scoring the opening goal; assisting David Vaughan's goal and earning the man of the match in Crewe's 2–2 draw with Northampton Town on 5 August 2006. Lowe continued his form over the first few games of the season, scoring a further two goals in late August. However, the arrival of Rodney Jack to the club saw him lose his starting place for much of September. He returned to the starting line up on 30 September 2006 against Carlisle United. Lowe scored his only hat-trick for Crewe as they ran out 5–1 winners at the Alexandra Stadium.

After spells in and out of the Crewe side, Lowe joined Stockport County on loan on 27 March 2008. His transfer was not made permanent and he was not included in the side which clinched promotion in the play-off final against Rochdale at Wembley Stadium.

=== Return to Chester City ===
On 2 July 2008, Lowe returned to Chester on a two-year deal, becoming the club's fifth summer signing after Anthony Barry, Jay Harris, David Mannix and Paul Taylor. Lowe scored twice including a penalty, in his first home game back for Chester against Leeds United in a 5–2 loss in the League Cup on 12 August 2008 and repeated the feat in a 5–1 thrashing of Barnet later in the month.

Lowe went on to comfortably finish as Chester's leading scorer with 18 goals (16 in the league), in a season which ended with the side suffering relegation from Football League Two. He received the club's player of the season award before the final match of the campaign against Darlington. The following week it was announced Lowe had left Chester by mutual agreement, with several Football League clubs interested in signing him.

=== Bury ===
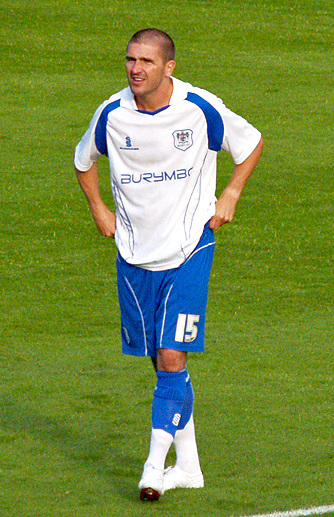
Ryan Lowe in his first spell at Bury in 2009.

On 10 June 2009, Bury confirmed the signing of Lowe on free transfer Lowe scored his first goal for Bury on 18 August 2009 away at Hereford United in a 3–1 win. Also, Lowe scored in Bury's 1–0 victory over rivals Rochdale, in the fixture at Gigg Lane. He scored his 100th league goal on 9 October 2010, bagging a brace against local rivals Accrington Stanley.

At the beginning of the 2010–11 season, he was named vice-captain by Alan Knill. On 1 March 2011, Lowe broke a 53-year-old club record by scoring in eight consecutive league games in a 3–0 victory over Shrewsbury Town at the Greenhous Meadow. After a goal in the following 3–0 victory over Hereford on 5 March he extended the record to nine games. On 25 April he scored Bury's third in a 3–2 win over league leaders Chesterfield in the 87th minute, promoting his side to League One.

=== Sheffield Wednesday ===
On 31 August 2011, Lowe joined Bury's fellow League One team Sheffield Wednesday for an undisclosed six figure fee.

=== Milton Keynes Dons and Tranmere Rovers ===
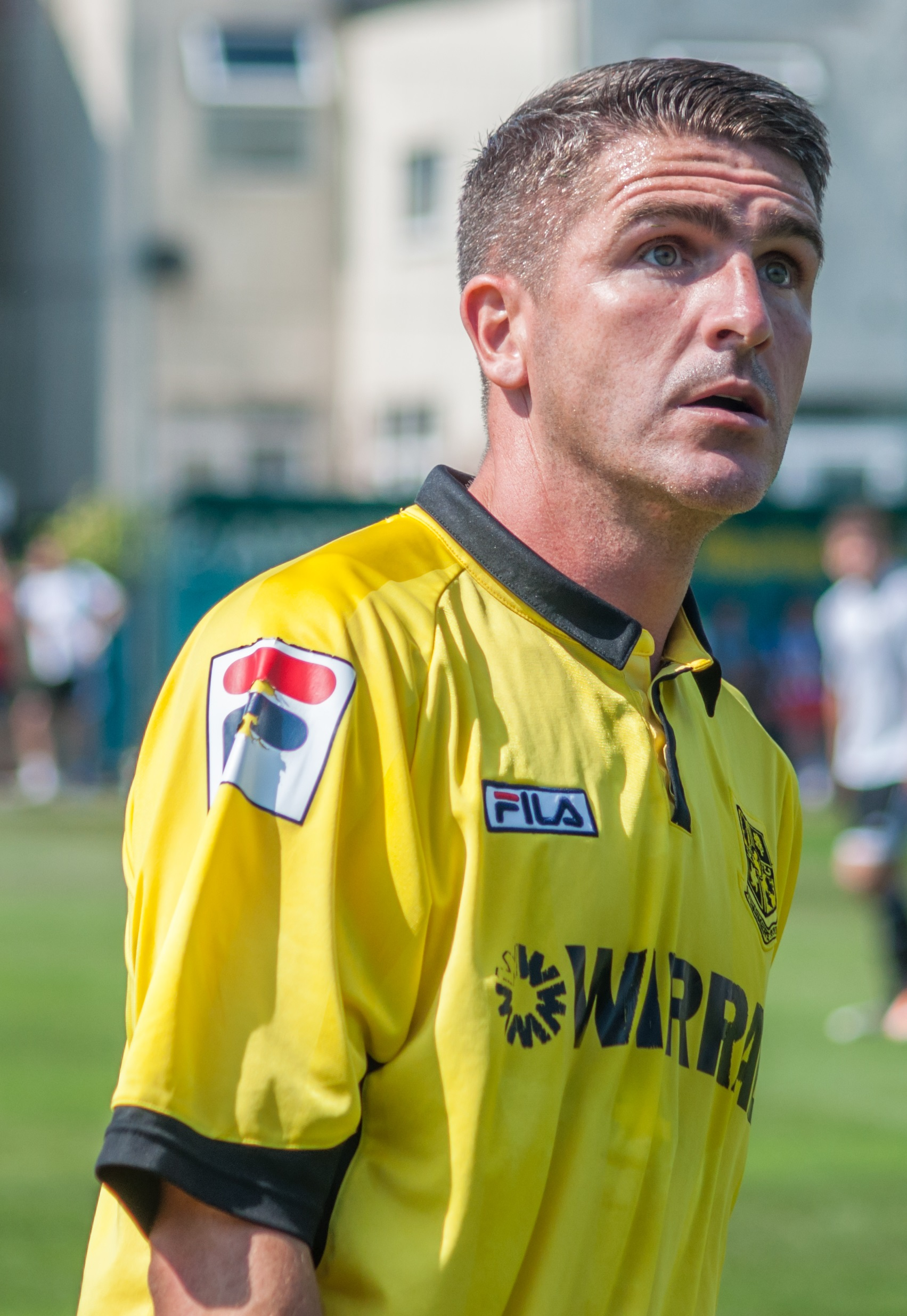
Lowe playing for Tranmere Rovers in 2013.

On 1 August 2012, Lowe signed for League One side Milton Keynes Dons for an undisclosed fee and was signed on a two-year deal after limited chances at Hillsborough. On 21 June 2013, Lowe agreed to cancel his Milton Keynes Dons contract and agreed to join Tranmere Rovers on a free transfer with a two-year deal.

=== Second contract with Bury ===
On 19 May 2014, Bury announced that they had re-signed Lowe on a two-year contract.

=== Return to Crewe Alexandra ===
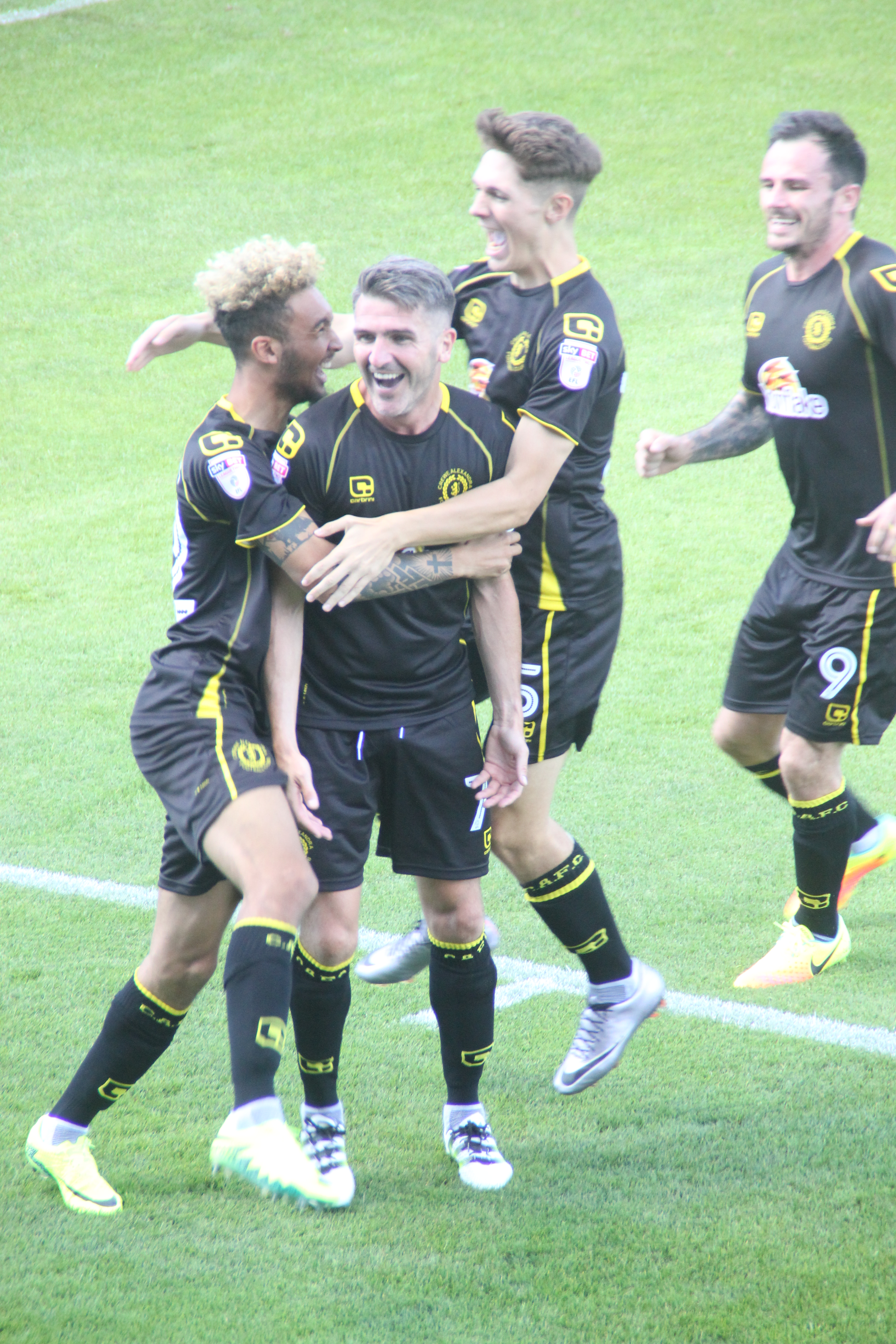
Ryan Lowe is congratulated by teammates after scoring the opening goal for Crewe Alexandra in a 2–1 win at Stevenage (6 August 2016).

On 23 November 2015 Lowe rejoined his former club Crewe Alexandra on loan until 5 January 2016, and in his first appearance scored a stoppage time winner at Colchester United. He signed a new full contract with Crewe in May 2016, and on 6 August made his third scoring Crewe debut with the first goal in a 2–1 win at Stevenage. Three days later, Lowe scored both Crewe goals in a 2–1 League Cup tie win at Sheffield United.

=== Player-coach at Bury ===
In January 2017, Lowe returned to Bury in a player-coach role. Following the dismissal of manager Lee Clark in October 2017, Lowe was appointed caretaker-manager, taking charge for Bury's FA Cup first-round tie at National League side Woking. He remained in charge for six games (two wins, two draws, two defeats) until 22 November when Chris Lucketti was appointed Clark's successor, with Lowe becoming player-coach again. In January 2018, after Lucketti was dismissed, Lowe was again appointed caretaker-manager, this time until the end of the season, with Ryan Kidd as his assistant. He decided to end his playing career to concentrate on management and coaching. His last match as a player was for Bury against Bristol Rovers on Friday, 30 March 2018 in League One.

== Managerial career ==
=== Bury ===
In May 2018, Lowe was appointed full-time manager of Bury on a two-year contract. Bury had just been relegated and, to "sort out the mess of the previous season" and prepare for the 2018–19 season in EFL League Two, Lowe was very busy in the transfer market with eleven players being transferred out or released, and another eleven being transferred in, all of them on free transfers. He said that players who did not fulfil their potential had to go and be replaced by players with some passion who "could get bums off seats at Gigg Lane".

After a shaky start to the season in which the new team found its feet, Bury had reached fourth place in the table when they travelled to promotion rivals Mansfield Town on Boxing Day. They lost that match and dropped to sixth place but then began an unbeaten run which firmly established them in the top three. In addition, Lowe led them to the semi-final stage of the EFL Trophy, Bury's best-ever showing in this tournament, before they were defeated by League One Portsmouth. In recognition of his success in turning the team around, Lowe was three times awarded the EFL League Two Manager of the Month award – in November 2018, January 2019 and February 2019.

=== Plymouth Argyle ===
On 5 June 2019, Lowe was announced as manager of Plymouth Argyle, guiding them to a third-place finish and an immediate return to League One in a season interrupted by the COVID-19 pandemic in the United Kingdom.

After guiding his side to four wins and two draws from six matches during an 17-game unbeaten run in the league, in a month that saw Plymouth top the League One table, Lowe was named EFL League One Manager of the Month for October 2021. On 7 December 2021, Lowe resigned as Plymouth manager, with the club fourth in League One.

=== Preston North End ===
Immediately following his departure from Plymouth on 7 December 2021, Lowe was appointed manager of Championship side Preston North End. He took Preston to a 13th-place finish in his first season, with the club finishing 12th and 10th in the following two seasons.

On 12 August 2024, after just one game of Preston's 2024–25 season (a 2–0 home defeat by Sheffield United), Lowe left the club by mutual consent. Preston director Peter Ridsdale said Lowe had asked to leave - "He told me he wanted a break, a change. ... we didn't initiate it."

=== Wigan Athletic ===
On 12 March 2025, Lowe was appointed head coach of League One side Wigan Athletic on a three-and-a-half year contract. Preston North End CEO Peter Ridsdale said he was "delighted" for Lowe. On 1 April 2025, Lowe was red-carded following angry exchanges in the technical area after Wigan conceded a 92nd-minute goal in a home defeat by Bolton Wanderers. Lowe gained his first win as manager in his seventh game, a 1–0 win at his former club and already relegated Shrewsbury Town on 18 April 2025. On 7 February 2026, a 6–1 defeat at Peterborough United left Wigan in the relegation zone following a seven-game winless run, and Lowe was dismissed as head coach.

== Style of management ==
Lowe's managerial style has been influenced by Jürgen Klopp, Pep Guardiola, Rafa Benítez and Lowe's long-time friend Steven Gerrard, among others. He is attack-minded, and Bury in 2018–19 were one of the Football League's highest-scoring teams; their style, described as "gung-ho", soon brought success as the club finished second in League Two and earned promotion back to League One. Lowe stated in an interview with The Guardian that he wanted to instil a "winning philosophy" and that, by outscoring their opponents, Bury would have a greater chance of achieving that goal. The on-field strategy was effectively a 3-1-4-2 formation.

== Career statistics ==
Appearances and goals by club, season and competition
Club	Season	League			FA Cup		League Cup		Other		Total	
Club	Season	Division	Apps	Goals	Apps	Goals	Apps	Goals	Apps	Goals	Apps	Goals
Shrewsbury Town	2000–01	Third Division	30	4	1	0	2	0	1 (Note: Appearances in Football League Trophy)	0	34	4
Shrewsbury Town	2001–02	Third Division	38	7	0	0	0	0	1	0	39	7
Shrewsbury Town	2002–03	Third Division	39	9	4	0	1	0	5	4	49	13
Shrewsbury Town	2003–04	Football Conference	34	9	1	0	—		4 (Note: One appearance one goal in Football League Trophy, one appearance in FA Trophy, two appearances in Conference play-offs)	1	39	10
Shrewsbury Town	2004–05	League Two	30	3	1	0	1	0	2	0	34	3
Shrewsbury Town	Total		171	32	7	0	4	0	13	5	195	37
Chester City	2004–05	League Two	8	4	0	0	0	0	0	0	8	4
Chester City	2005–06	League Two	32	10	2	3	0	0	0	0	34	13
Chester City	Total		40	14	2	3	0	0	0	0	42	17
Crewe Alexandra	2006–07	League One	37	8	0	0	2	1	5	3	44	12
Crewe Alexandra	2007–08	League One	27	4	2	0	0	0	1	1	30	5
Crewe Alexandra	Total		64	12	2	0	2	1	6	4	74	17
Stockport County (loan)	2007–08	League Two	4	0	0	0	0	0	0	0	4	0
Chester City	2008–09	League Two	45	16	1	0	1	2	1	0	48	18
Bury	2009–10	League Two	39	18	1	0	1	0	2	0	43	18
Bury	2010–11	League Two	46	27	2	1	1	0	1	0	50	28
Bury	2011–12	League One	5	4	0	0	2	3	0	0	7	7
Bury	Total		90	49	3	1	4	3	3	0	100	53
Sheffield Wednesday	2011–12	League One	26	8	4	1	0	0	0	0	30	9
Milton Keynes Dons	2012–13	League One	42	11	6	1	3	0	0	0	51	12
Tranmere Rovers	2013–14	League One	45	19	2	1	2	0	1	0	50	20
Bury	2014–15	League Two	34	9	2	0	1	1	1	1	38	11
Bury	2015–16	League One	19	6	3	0	0	0	0	0	22	6
Bury	Total		53	15	5	0	1	1	1	1	60	17
Crewe Alexandra (loan)	2015–16	League One	6	2	0	0	0	0	0	0	6	2
Crewe Alexandra	2016–17	League Two	22	5	2	1	2	2	2 (Note: Appearances in EFL Trophy)	1	28	9
Bury	2016–17	League One	12	1	0	0	0	0	0	0	12	1
Bury	2017–18	League One	6	0	0	0	0	0	2	0	8	0
Bury	Total		18	1	0	0	0	0	2	0	20	1
Career total			626	184	34	8	19	9	29	11	708	212

== Managerial statistics ==
As of match played 7 February 2026

Team	From	To	Record				
Team	From	To	G	W	D	L	Win %
Bury (caretaker)	30 October 2017	22 November 2017	6	2	2	2	33.33
Bury	15 January 2018	5 June 2019	75	32	21	22	42.67
Plymouth Argyle	5 June 2019	7 December 2021	128	55	29	44	42.97
Preston North End	7 December 2021	12 August 2024	125	47	31	47	37.60
Wigan Athletic	12 March 2025	7 February 2026	49	12	20	17	24.49
Totals			383	148	103	132	38.64

== Honours ==
=== Player ===
Shrewsbury Town

- Conference National play-offs: 2004

Bury

- Football League Two second-place promotion: 2010–11; promotion: 2014–15

Sheffield Wednesday

- Football League One second-place promotion: 2011–12

Individual

- Chester City Player of the Season: 2008–09
- Football League Two Player of the Month: January 2010, September 2010, February 2011, April 2011
- Bury Player of the Season: 2010–11
- PFA Team of the Year: 2010–11 Football League Two
- PFA League Two Fans' Player of the Year: 2010–11
- Football League One Player of the Month: August 2011, November 2013
- Tranmere Rovers Player of the Season: 2013–14

=== Manager ===
Bury

- EFL League Two promotion: 2018–19

Plymouth Argyle

- EFL League Two promotion: 2019–20

Individual

- EFL League Two Manager of the Month: November 2018, January 2019, February 2019, January 2020
- EFL League One Manager of the Month: October 2021
