= Tom Lees =

English footballer (born 1990)

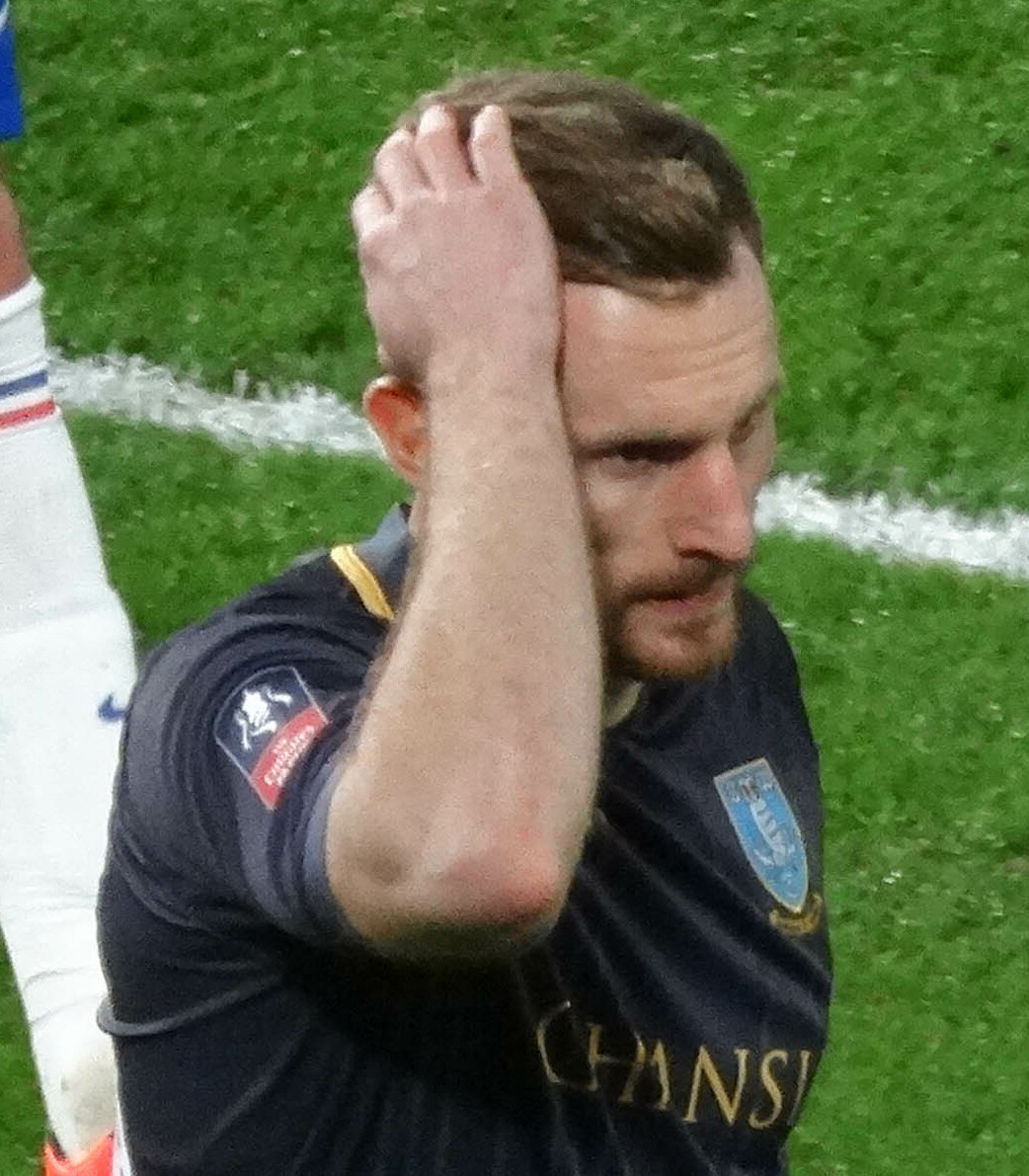
- Lees in 2019

Personal information
- Full name: Thomas James Lees
- Date of birth: 28 November 1990 (age 35)
- Place of birth: Birmingham, England
- Height: 6 ft 1 in (1.85 m)
- Position: Centre-back

Team information
- Current team: Harrogate Town
- Number: 12

Youth career
- 1999–2009: Leeds United

Senior career*
Years	Team	Apps	(Gls)
2009–2014	Leeds United	123	(3)
2009–2010	→ Accrington Stanley (loan)	39	(0)
2010–2011	→ Bury (loan)	45	(4)
2014–2021	Sheffield Wednesday	249	(10)
2021–2025	Huddersfield Town	142	(5)
2025–2026	Peterborough United	33	(0)
2026–	Harrogate Town	0	(0)

International career
2012–2013	England U21	6	(0)
- * Club domestic league appearances and goals as of 16:44, 4 May 2026 (BST)

Thomas James Lees (born 28 November 1990) is an English professional footballer who plays as a centre-back for National League side Harrogate Town.

Lees began his career in the youth teams at Leeds before turning professional with the Yorkshire club in early 2009. He made his professional debut whilst on a season-long loan at Accrington Stanley in their Football League Trophy first round victory over Oldham Athletic in September of the same year. He joined Bury on a similar deal the following season and was voted the Players' Player of the Year in the Shakers' promotion-winning campaign before returning to Leeds in the summer of 2012 where he established himself as a first-team regular. In September 2012, Lees was called up to the England U21 squad by manager Stuart Pearce.

== Early life ==
Lees was born in Birmingham, West Midlands, but moved to Knaresborough, North Yorkshire, when he was four years old.

== Club career ==
=== Leeds United ===
Lees began his football career at Leeds United when he joined as an eight-year-old. As part of the club, he watched the side from a young age and developed an admiration for United's legendary defender Lucas Radebe. He progressed through the youth ranks and was involved in the England U16 set up in the summer of 2005. His development was later hindered during his years as a scholar with the club when a knee injury required an operation when he was 17. After he completed his rehabilitation, Lees turned professional in January 2009 when he signed a two-and-a-half-year contract with the club. He studied at Boston Spa Academy during his time in the Leeds United Academy.

He later experienced his first taste of senior football with Leeds when he was included in Simon Grayson's squad for the pre-season friendly tour of the Republic of Ireland and Northern Ireland and featured in the matches against Shelbourne and Glentoran. With senior centre-backs Rui Marques, Patrick Kisnorbo, Richard Naylor, Ľubomír Michalík, Leigh Bromby and Paul Huntington also in the first-team squad, Lees found his opportunities limited for the 2009–10 season with the club looking to sending him out on loan to gain experience.

==== Accrington Stanley loan spell ====
He joined League Two club Accrington Stanley on loan on 1 September 2009, of which Leeds manager Simon Grayson commented saying; "The move to Accrington will give him the opportunity to spend time in a first-team environment and we will be keeping an eye on him". He made his debut on the same day for Accrington in their 2–1 away win over Oldham Athletic in the Football League Trophy.

With Lees impressing in his first few games for Accrington, Simon Grayson revealed that he was keen for Lees to stay out on loan at Accrington to continue to get first-team matches. In late December, Lees' loan at Accrington was extended until the end of the 2009–10 season. On 23 February 2010, Lees signed a two-year contract extension with Leeds United until July 2012. During his loan spell at Accrington, Lees was mainly played as a right-back. He impressed in the 46 appearances he played in all competitions, and Accrington Stanley manager John Coleman revealed he wanted to re-sign Lees again for the following season.

==== Return to Leeds ====
At the end of the 2009–10 season Lees returned to Leeds' after playing 39 league games for Accrington Stanley, and 45 games in all competitions. The following season, he featured in both of Leeds United's pre-season games in Slovakia against MFK Ružomberok and MFK Košice as part of a 20-man squad that travelled. Lees also played for Leeds in Norway against SK Brann. In Leeds' final pre-season fixture, Lees was an unused substitute against Wolverhampton Wanderers in the 3–1 victory at Elland Road.

==== Bury loan ====
On 3 August 2010, Lees joined League Two club Bury on a six-month loan in order to gain more first-team experience. Lees played against Bury two weeks prior to signing, when he came on as a substitute for Leeds in the 4–0 loss. On 14 August, he scored his first goal of the season at the Kassam Stadium versus the newly promoted Oxford United collecting his second man of the match award for Bury. Lees scored his second goal of the season for Bury against Exeter City in the FA Cup. With Lees impressing in his loan spell he was linked with a new contract at Leeds. On 10 December he signed a new two-and-a-half-year contract with Leeds, and it was announced on 30 December, that he had extended his loan at Bury until the end of the season.

Lees scored the winner for Bury in a 1–0 win against Lincoln on 22 April. Lees also scored the winner in a 1–0 victory over Burton Albion. On 25 April he scored his fifth goal of the season in his club's 3–2 win over league leaders Chesterfield, a game which confirmed Bury's promotion to League One. After an impressive season at Bury, Leeds manager Simon Grayson stated that he thought Lees had a big future at Leeds United. During his loan spell he played 50 times for the club, and appeared in all but one of Bury's league matches. Lees won the Players' Player of the Year Award at Bury's annual player of the season awards ceremony. Bury manager Richie Barker said he believed that Lees was the best young centre-backs in League Two and heavily praised Lees in an interview in the Yorkshire Evening Post.

==== Leeds first team ====
After returning to Leeds, he played a part in all Leeds' 2011–12 pre-season fixtures either as a substitute or in the starting line-up. Lees made his debut against Bradford City as a second-half substitute in their 3–2 victory, making an instant impact by gaining an assist by setting up the opening goal for Ross McCormack. Lees made his League debut for Leeds on 13 August against Middlesbrough in a match Leeds lost 1–0. He scored an own goal in his second start for Leeds against Hull City, he then made amends when scored his first goal for the club in the same game with a strike from inside the penalty area. Despite being a centre-back, Lees found himself a regular as the right-back for Leeds with Patrick Kisnorbo and Darren O'Dea the preferred central defensive partnership. Lees was also part of the Leeds team that came undone in a 3–0 loss against fierce rivals Manchester United in the League Cup, Lees almost scored for Leeds early on in the game but he found his header cleared off the line.

Lees signed a new contract extension with the club on 30 September, the new contract extended his existing contract until 2015. After playing all his games at right-back for Leeds, Lees was moved into his favoured centre-back position against Portsmouth on 1 October, Leeds also kept their first clean sheet of the season in the same game. Lees' second goal of the season came in Leeds 3–0 win against Doncaster Rovers on 14 October. Lees provided the assist for Robert Snodgrass in the 1–1 draw against Cardiff City. Lees was red carded for deliberate handball after an error by goalkeeper Paul Rachubka against Blackpool.

Lees revealed in April that he had broken his nose four times over the course of the season and he would require surgery on the damaged nose when the season finished. Lees was named as Leeds' Young Player of the Year during the end of season awards on 28 April.

At the end of the 2011–12 season, Leeds manager Neil Warnock revealed on 2 May that Lees had been offered a new contract at Leeds United. Warnock revealed to Yorkshire Radio that he felt that Lees had been one of the bright sparks of the season and that he had become one of the first names on the team sheet for Leeds. Lees' first goal of the season came in Leeds' 2–1 defeat against Blackpool. Lees scored his second goal of the season in the League Cup match against Oxford United.

=== Sheffield Wednesday ===
Lees signed for Leeds' Championship rivals Sheffield Wednesday on 31 July 2014 on a three-year contract for an undisclosed fee. After his first season he would extend his stay until 2019, and a year after that would sign a much larger contract keeping him at the club until the summer of 2021.

On 24 April 2021, Lees would be stretchered off in a game against Middlesbrough after landing awkwardly on his ankle, which resulted in him being ruled out for the remaining two games of the season with ligament damage. This would eventually be his last game for the club, as on 20 May 2021 it was announced that he would leave Sheffield Wednesday at the end of the season, following the expiry of his contract.

=== Huddersfield Town ===
Lees signed for Huddersfield Town following his departure from Sheffield Wednesday on a 2-year contract, officially joining the club on 1 August 2021. He was part of the side that reached the 2022 EFL Championship play-offs Final.

On 30 August 2022, Lees signed a new three-year deal with Huddersfield.

Lees departed the club upon the expiration of his contract at the end of the 2024–25 season.

=== Peterborough United ===
On 16 August 2025, Lees signed for Peterborough United.. On 4 May 2026, it was announced Lees would leave the club following the expiry of his contract.

=== Harrogate Town ===
On 30 July 2026, Lees signed for National League club Harrogate Town.

== International career ==
=== England Under-16s ===
Lees was involved in the England Under-16 set-up in the summer of 2005 as part of a promising group of Leeds United youngsters which also included Stefan Connor, Liam Darville, Tom Elliott, Ben Gordon, Jason Mycoe, Danny Rose, Tom Taiwo and Michael Woods. A knee injury hindered his progression in the England youth set-up whilst many of his United teammates went on to sign for Premier League sides before playing professional football for the Elland Road club.

=== England Under-21s ===
After an impressive start to the 2012–13 season with Leeds United which included two goals in his first four games, Lees was called up to the England U21 squad by manager Stuart Pearce for the 2013 UEFA European Under-21 Championship qualification group matches against Azerbaijan and Norway. He made his debut for the side in the 1–0 victory over Norway at Chesterfield's Proact Stadium as a substitute; replacing goalscorer Connor Wickham in the 77th minute. After the game, Pearce praised Lees' versatility and leadership qualities and described him as a 'no-nonsense lad and no-nonsense player.' He retained his place in the squad for the crucial qualification play-off games versus Serbia the following month, appearing as a second- half substitute in the 1–0 second leg victory in Kruševac after replacing Bolton Wanderers striker Marvin Sordell. England won 2–0 on aggregate and qualified for the UEFA U21 Championships in 2013 in Israel. After the game, Lees was caught up in a mass-brawl between English and Serbian playing and coaching staff after teammate Danny Rose was allegedly subjected to racist abuse and monkey chanting. He was seen grappling with seventeen-year-old Partizan midfielder Nikola Ninković whilst a frustrated Rose was sent-off for kicking a ball away in reaction to the abuse after the whistle.

Lees made his first start for England U21 on 13 November in England's 2–0 victory over Northern Ireland.

Following the end of the 2012–13 season, Lees was named in the squad for the European U21 Championship. Stuart Pearce reserved special praise for Lees' attitude to training and his professionalism. Lees was an unused substitute as England crashed out of the tournament following defeats to Italy and Norway. Lees started the final game of England's tournament, playing 90 minutes in the defeat to Israel.

== Career statistics ==
As of end of 2025–26 season

Appearances and goals by club, season and competition
Club	Season	League			FA Cup		League Cup		Other		Total	
Club	Season	Division	Apps	Goals	Apps	Goals	Apps	Goals	Apps	Goals	Apps	Goals
Leeds United	2009–10	League One	0	0	—		0	0	—		0	0
Leeds United	2011–12	Championship	42	2	1	0	2	0	—		45	2
Leeds United	2012–13	Championship	40	1	4	0	4	1	—		48	2
Leeds United	2013–14	Championship	41	0	0	0	1	0	—		42	0
Leeds United	Total		123	3	5	0	7	1	—		135	4
Accrington Stanley (loan)	2009–10	League Two	39	0	4	0	—		3 (Note: Appearances in Football League Trophy)	0	46	0
Bury (loan)	2010–11	League Two	45	4	2	1	1	0	2	0	50	5
Sheffield Wednesday	2014–15	Championship	44	0	1	0	3	0	—		48	0
Sheffield Wednesday	2015–16	Championship	34	3	0	0	5	0	3 (Note: Appearances in Championship play-offs)	0	42	3
Sheffield Wednesday	2016–17	Championship	35	1	1	0	0	0	2	0	38	1
Sheffield Wednesday	2017–18	Championship	29	1	0	0	2	0	—		31	1
Sheffield Wednesday	2018–19	Championship	42	2	3	0	1	0	—		46	2
Sheffield Wednesday	2019–20	Championship	27	2	3	0	0	0	—		30	2
Sheffield Wednesday	2020–21	Championship	38	1	0	0	1	0	—		39	1
Sheffield Wednesday	Total		249	10	8	0	12	0	5	0	274	10
Huddersfield Town	2021–22	Championship	40	3	3	1	1	1	3	0	47	5
Huddersfield Town	2022–23	Championship	42	2	1	0	1	0	—		44	2
Huddersfield Town	2023–24	Championship	31	0	1	0	0	0	—		32	0
Huddersfield Town	2024–25	League One	29	0	1	0	0	0	2	1	32	1
Huddersfield Town	Total		142	5	6	1	2	1	5	1	155	8
Peterborough United	2025–26	League One	33	0	2	0	0	0	1	0	36	0
Career total			631	22	27	2	22	2	16	1	696	27

== Honours ==
Bury

- Football League Two runner-up: 2010–11

Individual

- Bury Players' Player of the Year: 2010–11
- Leeds United Young Player of the Year: 2011–12
