= Kristian Platt =

English footballer

Personal information
- Date of birth: 15 December 1991 (age 34)
- Place of birth: Rock Ferry, Birkenhead, England
- Position: Defender

Youth career
- 2008–2009: Chester City

Senior career*
Years	Team	Apps	(Gls)
2009–2010	Chester City	1	(0)
2010–2014	Stalybridge Celtic	132	(12)
2014–2015	AFC Telford United	13	(1)
2015–2016	Bala Town	9	(0)
2016–2017	Stalybridge Celtic	12	(0)
2016–?	→ Warrington Town (loan)		
2017–2021	Airbus UK		
2021–2023	Colwyn Bay		
2023–2025	Airbus UK		
2024–2025	Holywell Town		
- * Club domestic league appearances and goals as of 11:42, 6 May 2015 (UTC)

Kristian Platt (born 15 December 1991, Rock Ferry, Birkenhead) is a defender.

Platt made his professional debut as a 17-year-old substitute for Shaun Kelly against Darlington on 3 May 2009 in Chester's final match in The Football League following relegation. Prior to his debut, Platt had been linked to moves to Premier League clubs and had played for the first-team in a friendly match against Southport.

Platt joined AFC Telford United on 9 July 2014, meaning he would step up a league, moving into the Conference Premier.

He left Stalybridge Celtic at the end of the 2016/17 season and signed for Airbus UK Broughton.

He moved to Colwyn Bay in June 2021 from Airbus.
