= Paul Smith (footballer, born 1991) =

English footballer

Personal information
- Full name: Paul John Smith
- Date of birth: 17 November 1991 (age 34)
- Place of birth: Liverpool, England
- Height: 1.75 m (5 ft 9 in)
- Position: Defender

Youth career
- 2008–2009: Chester City

Senior career*
| Years | Team | Apps | (Gls) |
| 2009 | Chester City | 5 | (0) |
| 2009–2010 | Rhyl | 7 | (1) |
| 2010–2011 | Droylsden | 1 | (0) |
| 2011–2012 | Barrow | 40 | (3) |
| 2014–2015 | Southport | 24 | (2) |
- * Club domestic league appearances and goals as of 12:16, 22 January 2012 (UTC)

Paul John Smith (born 17 November 1991, Liverpool) is an English footballer. He plays as a central midfielder, and a full-back.

== Career ==
A product of Chester's youth policy, Smith made his debut in The Football League as a 17-year-old substitute against Rochdale on 3 February 2009. He went on to make four further substitute appearances for the club during their relegation season from Football League Two. Released at the end of the season, Smith joined Welsh Premier League side Rhyl, having been recommended by former Chester manager Simon Davies. However, he left the club less than six months later when his contract was cancelled by the club due to "ongoing disciplinary problems". On 6 March 2010, Smith signed for Droylsden, having previously featured for the club in a pre-season friendly prior to signing for Rhyl. He spent a year at the club, before moving late in the 2010–11 season to Barrow AFC in the Conference National. In May 2011 he was offered a new contract by Barrow, and spent another season at the club. He was released at the end of the 2011–12 season.

Smith signed for Southport after trials at the club during the summer of 2014. For most of the season he played only a small role at the club, coming on as a substitute on numerous occasions, however after a superb display against Championship club Derby County, he won a starting role in the team, playing a key part in the clubs push for survival in the Conference Premier. He signed a new deal at the club for the 2015–16 season.
