= M. Wynn Thomas =

Welsh academic

M. Wynn Thomas OBE FEA FLSW FBA is a Professor of English at Swansea University and holds the Emyr Humphreys Chair of Welsh Writing in English at Swansea University. His expertise is in American poetry and modern Welsh literature.

== Career ==
Thomas graduated from Swansea University in 1965 with a BA in English, and after starting his postgraduate studies, he was appointed a member of staff at Swansea University at the age of just 21, and spent much of his academic career working there. Alongside teaching English, Thomas was the founder and former director of the Centre for Research into the English Literature and Language of Wales (CREW) at Swansea University.

Away from his work at Swansea University, Thomas was the former Chairman of the Books Council of Wales, the former Chairman of the Welsh Arts Council's Literature Committee, and the former Chairman of the Welsh Academy of Writers, Yr Academi Gymreig.

== Honours ==
- 1996 – Elected Fellow of the British Academy
- 2000 – Elected Fellow of Yr Academi Gymreig
- 2000 – Received highest honour of the National Eisteddfod of Wales
- 2010 – Founding Fellow of the Learned Society of Wales

== Selected works ==
- Thomas, M. Wynn (1987). The Lunar Light of Whitman's Poetry. Cambridge, Massachusetts: Harvard University. ISBN 978-0-674-53952-4
- Thomas, M. Wynn (2009). In the Shadow of the Pulpit: Literature and Nonconformist Wales. Cardiff: University of Wales Press. ISBN 978-1-78316-477-6
- Thomas, M. Wynn (2009). Transatlantic Connections: Whitman US, Whitman UK. Iowa: University of Iowa Press. ISBN 978-0-87745-925-8
