= Ben Jones (footballer, born 1992) =

Welsh footballer

Personal information
- Date of birth: 7 July 1992 (age 34)
- Place of birth: Wrexham, Wales
- Position: Forward

Team information
- Current team: Flint Town United

Youth career
- Preston North End
- 2008–: Chester City

Senior career*
Years	Team	Apps	(Gls)
2009–2010	Chester City	15	(0)
2010	Colwyn Bay	0	(0)
2010–	Flint Town United		

International career^{‡}
2008–2009	Wales U17	2	(0)
- * Club domestic league appearances and goals as of 21:15, 2009-08-15 ‡ National team caps and goals as of 18:00 6 August 2009

Ben Jones (born 7 July 1992, Wrexham) is a Welsh footballer who made several appearances in The Football League with Chester City during his first year as an apprentice at the club.

The forward made his debut as a late substitute for Richie Partridge in Chester's 3–1 home loss to Chesterfield on 17 January 2009, before replacing the same player when Chester drew 1–1 at Lincoln City the following week. He became a regular member of Chester's matchday squad in the closing stages of the season, which ended in relegation from Football League Two.

Before joining Chester, Jones was with Preston North End. A former pupil at Connah's Quay High School, Jones was a product of the Flintshire Schoolboys team that has previously produced stars such as Ian Rush and Michael Owen.

On 26 March he joined Colwyn Bay along with fellow former Chester City player Glenn Rule.

In October 2010 he joined Flint Town United and he scored on his debut on 9 October 2010 in the ninth minute in a 5–0 win over Rhayader Town.

He later played in the lower leagues of Welsh football for FC Nomads of Connah's Quay and Rhydymwyn.
