= Ritchie Branagan =

Footballer (born 1991)

Personal information
- Full name: Ritchie Peter Branagan
- Date of birth: 20 October 1991 (age 35)
- Place of birth: Gravesend, England
- Position: Goalkeeper

Team information
- Current team: Hyde United

Youth career
- Bolton Wanderers
- Bury

Senior career*
| Years | Team | Apps | (Gls) |
| 2009–2012 | Bury | 2 | (0) |
| 2012–2013 | Salford City | 38 | (0) |
| 2013–2017 | Macclesfield Town | 14 | (0) |
| 2017 | Chorley | 20 | (0) |
| 2017–2018 | Droylsden | | |
| 2018 | SRC Hiroshima | | |
| 2019 | FK Beograd | | |
| 2023– | Hyde United | 0 | (0) |

International career
| 2011 | Republic of Ireland U21 | 1 | (0) |
- * Club domestic league appearances and goals

Ritchie Peter Branagan (born 20 October 1991) is a footballer who plays as a goalkeeper for Hyde United. Born in England, he made one appearance for the Republic of Ireland U21 national team. He has also played in Japan and Australia.

== Club career ==
Branagan was born in Gravesend, Kent. Having previously been part of the youth system at Bolton Wanderers he joined the youth set-up at Bury. He joined Bury's first team squad for the 2009–10 season and was granted a one-year contract extension in the summer of 2010.

He made his Football League debut on 23 October 2010 as a 60th-minute substitute for the injured Cameron Belford in a match with Southend United. In May 2011 he was offered a new contract by the club. He signed a new 12-month contract with Bury in June 2011. In May 2012, Branagan was released by the club after being deemed surplus to requirements.

In August 2012 he joined Salford City. In August 2013 he signed for Macclesfield Town after a successful trial and made his debut on 2 November 2013 in the FA Cup against Swindon Town.

Following his release from Macclesfield Town he joined Chorley in January 2017 as a replacement for the injured Sam Ashton.

He finished his career at Droylsden after signing for them in 2017.

On 28 May 2023 Ritchie made his non league return signing with Hyde United FC

== International career ==
Branagan made his Republic of Ireland U21 debut in Cyprus in February 2011.

== Personal life ==
He is the son of former Bolton goalkeeper Keith Branagan.

== Career statistics ==
As of match played 13 November 2010

Appearances and goals by club, season and competition
| Club | Season | League | | National cup | | League cup | | Continental | | Other (Note: Includes FA Community Shield, UEFA Super Cup, Intercontinental Cup, FIFA Club World Cup, Football League Trophy) | | Total | |
| Club | Season | Apps | Goals | Apps | Goals | Apps | Goals | Apps | Goals | Apps | Goals | Apps | Goals |
|---|---|---|---|---|---|---|---|---|---|---|---|---|---|
| Bury | 2010–11 | 2 | 0 | 0 | 0 | 0 | 0 | – | | 1 | 0 | 3 | 0 |
| Career total | | 2 | 0 | 0 | 0 | 0 | 0 | 0 | 0 | 1 | 0 | 3 | 0 |
