= Joe Price (cricketer) =

Welsh cricketer

Personal information
- Full name: Howard Joseph Price
- Born: 20 September 1928; Tredegar, Monmouthshire, Wales
- Died: 30 October 1992 (aged 64); Moulton, Lincolnshire, England
- Batting: Right-handed
- Bowling: Right-arm off break

Domestic team information
- Years: Team
- 1960–1975: Lincolnshire

Career statistics
Competition	List A
Matches	2
Runs scored	0
Batting average	0.00
100s/50s	–/–
Top score	0
Balls bowled	120
Wickets	3
Bowling average	32.33
5 wickets in innings	–
10 wickets in match	–
Best bowling	2/47
Catches/stumpings	–/–
- Source: Cricinfo, 16 February 2019

Howard Joseph Price (20 September 1928 – 30 October 1992) was a Welsh cricketer.

Price made his debut in minor counties cricket for Lincolnshire against the Yorkshire Second XI in the 1960 Minor Counties Championship. He played minor counties cricket for Lincolnshire until 1975, making a total of 87 appearances in the Minor Counties Championship. During this time he played two List A matches for Lincolnshire. The first came against Northumberland at Jesmond in the 1st round of the 1971 Gillette Cup, with the second coming against Warwickshire in the second round of the same competition at Edgbaston.

He died at Moulton, Lincolnshire in October 1992.
