= Dafydd Carter =

Wales international rugby league footballer

- Full name: Dafydd Carter
- Born: 12 February 1992 (age 34) Wales

Rugby union career
- Position: Inside Centre
Senior career
Years	Team	Apps	(Points)
- Bargoed RFC
- Rugby league career

Playing information
- Position: Stand-off
Club
Years	Team	Pld	T	G	FG	P
≤2010–10	Crusaders
2011–	South Wales Scorpions
	Total	0	0	0	0	0
Representative
Years	Team	Pld	T	G	FG	P
2010–	Wales	1

Dafydd Carter (born 12 February 1992) is a Welsh professional rugby union and rugby league footballer. He played club level rugby union (RU) for Bargoed RFC, as an Inside Centre, and representative level rugby league (RL) for Wales, and at club level for Crusaders and South Wales Scorpions as a stand-off.

== International honours ==
Dafydd Carter won a cap for Wales while at Crusaders in 2010.
