= Bedwyr Lewis Jones =

Welsh scholar, literary critic and linguist

Bedwyr Lewis Jones (1 September 1933 – 28 August 1992) was a Welsh scholar, literary critic and linguist.

Jones was born in Wrexham, Denbighshire but brought up in Llaneilian on Anglesey (Ynys Môn), north Wales. He was educated at Jesus College, Oxford, matriculating in 1956. He taught at Dolgellau for a year, before becoming a lecturer at University College, Bangor In 1974, he became Bangor's head of the Department of Welsh Language and Literature and a professor.

== Works ==
Studies:

- Yr Hen Bersoniaid Llengar (1963). Aspects of 18th and 19th century Welsh-language literature.
- R. Williams Parry in the series Writers of Wales. A study of poet R. Williams Parry.
- Arthur y Cymry (1975). "The Arthur of the Welsh".
- Iaith Sir Fôn (1983). The spoken Welsh of Anglesey.
- Yn Ei Elfen (1992). Etymology.

As editor:

- Blodeugerdd o'r Bedwaredd Ganrif ar Bymtheg (1965). Anthology of 19th century Welsh-language verse.
- Rhyddiaith R. Williams Parry (1974). R. Williams Parry's prose works.
- Gwŷr Môn (1979). "Men of Anglesey", biographies.
