= John Weston Thomas =

Revivor of Welsh harp making (1921–1992)

John Weston Thomas (25 January 1921 – 1992) revived the tradition of Welsh harp making.

Thomas was born in Cardiff. After spells in the merchant navy, and teaching carpentry, he began making harps, originally with the aid of old instruments and illustrations, as there was no existing harp maker to teach him. Although the harp is firmly associated with Wales, at the time he was the only harp maker in Wales, and one of three in the whole of Britain. John Weston Thomas had three students, these were Alun Thomas (his son), Bryan Blackmore (in Pembrokeshire) and Allan Shiers (in Llandysul); all three are still working as harp makers. John Weston Thomas died in Pembrokeshire in 1992 having worked until shortly before his death.
