= Lloyd Ellams =

English footballer (born 1991)

Personal information
- Full name: Lloyd Ashley Ellams
- Date of birth: 11 January 1991 (age 35)
- Place of birth: Chester, England
- Position: Striker

Youth career
- 2007–2008: Chester City

Senior career*
Years	Team	Apps	(Gls)
2008–2010	Chester City	18	(1)
2008	→ Droylsden (loan)	0	(0)
2010	Marine	0	(0)
2010–2012	Stalybridge Celtic	44	(7)
2012–2013	Vauxhall Motors		
2012	Conwy Borough	0	(0)
2014	Rhyl	18	(9)
2014–2015	Marine		
2015	Colwyn Bay		
2015–?	Marine		
- Blacon Youth
2017–?	Droyslden		
2020–2022	Penycae		
2022	Skelmerdale United		
2023–2025	Flint Mountain		
- * Club domestic league appearances and goals as of 12:33, 11 July 2010 (UTC)

Lloyd Ashley Ellams (born 11 January 1991) is an English footballer who plays as a striker.

== Career ==
=== Early career ===
Born in Chester, Cheshire, Ellams was member of Chester City's youth system. He gained experience with a loan spell at Conference North team Droylsden early in the 2008–09 season. His debut in the Football League followed as a late substitute for Richie Partridge in Chester's 2–0 home loss to Rochdale on 3 February 2009. After a further substitute appearance at Shrewsbury Town in February, Ellams was handed his first start in the penultimate match of the season at Aldershot Town. He won Chester an early penalty and then scored his first goal for the club later in the match, making him the last player to score for Chester in the football league; the 2–2 draw effectively relegated City. After the club's demise in 2010, Ellams signed for Northern Premier League side Marine.

=== Stalybridge Celtic ===
He signed for Conference North side Stalybridge Celtic prior to the 2010–11 season, making his debut for the club on 14 August 2010 in a 2–0 win over Redditch United. Ellams scored his first goal for the club on 28 September 2010 in extra time of an FA Cup tie against Alfreton Town. He scored his first league goal for the club on 6 November 2010 in a 5–0 win over Workington in which his strike partner, Phil Marsh, scored the other four goals. He agreed a new contract at the club in June 2010 which would keep him at the Tameside club until the end of the 2011–12 season.

== Honours ==
- Ardal NW – Champions: 2023–24 (Flint Mountain)
- NEWFA Challenge Cup – Winner: 2023–24 (Flint Mountain)
- Cheshire Amateur Cup – Winner: 2018–19 (Blacon Youth)
