= David Mannix =

English footballer (born 1985)

Personal information
- Full name: David Christopher Mannix
- Date of birth: 24 September 1985 (age 41)
- Place of birth: Winsford, England
- Position: Midfielder

Youth career
- Liverpool

Senior career*
Years	Team	Apps	(Gls)
2004–2007	Liverpool	0	(0)
2006	→ Accrington Stanley (loan)	1	(0)
2007–2008	HamKam	28	(0)
2008	Accrington Stanley	17	(0)
2008–2009	Chester City	13	(2)
2010–2012	Vauxhall Motors	67	(4)
2012–2013	Colwyn Bay	31	(2)
2013–2015	Warrington Town	87	(11)
2015–2016	Rhyl	18	(0)
Total		255	(19)

International career
	England Youth	15	(1)

Managerial career
- 2018–2019: Clitheroe (assistant)
- 2019–2020: Bangor City (assistant)
- 2020–2021: Rylands (assistant)
- 2021–2022: Glossop North End (assistant)
- * Club domestic league appearances and goals

David Christopher Mannix (born 24 September 1985) is an English retired footballer who played as a midfielder. He has served as assistant manager and academy director at Bangor City.

== International career ==
Mannix was a youth England international at under 15/16, 17 and 20 levels and gained 15 caps in total. He scored his first international goal against Poland in a 5–0 victory on 22 November 2001. David was also part of the England team in the 2002 UEFA European Under-17 Football Championship who reached the semi-final in Denmark and finished in 3rd place.

== Playing career ==
Mannix is a product of Liverpool Football Club's Academy, and played regularly for the reserves, making over 60 appearances. Mannix was one of the youngest ever players to play for Liverpool reserves: he was 15 and was moved to train at Melwood with the first team aged 16. His progress was restricted by a number of serious injuries, including an injury to his right knee in 2001. He was sent to the world-renowned Dr Richard Steadman in Colorado, America who specialises in knee surgery. David returned after his lengthy 3-year injury nightmare and seen himself gain his first team squad number 'Mannix 38' and become a member of the first team squad . He enjoyed being involved in the first team squad which won the UEFA Champions league trophy in 2005 in Istanbul . David Came back to represent England at U20 level . 12 months later he suffered a broken leg whilst playing for Liverpool reserves against Newcastle united .

Under-18 Academy manager John Owens said: "At Under-15/Under-16 level David was such a shining light in central midfield. He is a very strong but gifted midfield player. But for his injuries he would be playing regularly for the reserves and making tremendous progress towards being the next Academy player through to the first team squad."

In November 2006 he went on loan to Accrington Stanley, but after making a promising debut and being selected in the league 2 team of the week, a slight injury picked up in the game forced him to return after less than a week after just one appearance. On 24 January 2007 it was announced that his contract with Liverpool had been terminated by mutual agreement, and on 29 January he signed a three-year contract with the Norwegian club Ham-Kam, who play in the Adeccoligaen having been relegated from the Tippeligaen (Norwegian premier league) during the 2006 season. While at Ham-Kam, David helped the side to get promoted back to the Tippeligaen after one season.

He returned to England in January 2008, rejoining Accrington Stanley before being released at the end of the season. On 25 June 2008 he joined Chester City on a two-year contract along with Accrington teammate Jay Harris.

On 17 October 2008, Mannix was hospitalised with facial injuries following an incident at Chester's training ground. After this incident, Mannix managed to fight his way back into the first team and played in every game for Chester from the end of January. Mannix managed to score his first professional league goal on 28 February 2009 against Dagenham and Redbridge for Chester with a header into the top right corner. Mannix's second league goal for Chester came in their 2–1 victory against Notts County on 4 April.

Following on from the end of his ban for betting he went on trial with League 2 club Morecambe and German 3rd division team Unterhaching.

In October 2010 he joined Vauxhall Motors. Mannix made an important start to his career at Vauxhall Motors by scoring the only goal of the game in their 1–0 victory against Newcastle Town to help the side reach the FA Cup first round.

After a spell with Colwyn Bay, Mannix signed for Warrington Town in January 2013.

In June 2015 Mannix signed for Welsh Premier League club Rhyl.

== Match fixing/betting scandal ==
On 7 April 2009 Mannix (and four other players) was charged with breaching the FA's rules on betting. He was accused of placing a bet of approximately £,4000 on Accrington Stanley losing against Bury in the final game of the 2007/2008 season. On 22 July 2009 Mannix was given a 10-month ban and fined £4,000 for these betting offences.

== Coaching career ==
Mannix went on to coaching, becoming a part of management teams across the North West and Wales. He was appointed assistant manager of Clitheroe in April 2018, before joining Bangor City in the same role in 2019.

He joined Rylands as assistant manager and first team coach in May 2020. In August 2021, Mannix joined Glossop North End as assistant manager, a position he held until 2022.

Mannix also had an International Football Academy based in Liverpool called 'Platinum International Football Academy'. This was dissolved in 2015. He has numerous Qualifications within football which includes FA UEFA A license & Youth.
