= Neil Carroll =

English footballer

Personal information
- Full name: Neil Carroll
- Date of birth: 21 September 1988 (age 38)
- Place of birth: Liverpool, England
- Height: 5 ft 11 in (1.80 m)
- Position: Midfielder

Youth career
- Liverpool FC Academy
- 2005–2007: Chester City

Senior career*
Years	Team	Apps	(Gls)
2007–2008	Chester City	1	(0)
2008	Leigh RMI (loan)	21	(?)
2008–2010	Caernarfon Town	1	(0)
- * Club domestic league appearances and goals as of 1 December 2008

Neil Carroll (born 21 September 1988) is an English former footballer.

Carroll spent four years at the Liverpool Academy before he joined Chester City as a junior, progressing to a professional contract. He made his solitary Football League appearance for Chester in a 2–1 win at Macclesfield Town on 29 September 2007, starting the game in midfield. He was loaned to Leigh RMI under Steve Bleasdale in 2008 and was released by Chester at the end of the season.

He joined Caernarfon Town in July 2008.

== Personal life ==
In July 2012, Carroll was left with permanent brain damage and in a wheelchair, following a fall from a Liverpool flyover, after being abandoned by a taxi driver who stole from him. The taxi driver was convicted of theft in May 2013.

His mother later sought to sue the convicted taxi driver on his behalf as well as the taxi owner, the taxi company and the insurance company, claiming his injuries were as direct consequence of his taxi journey home. The case went as far as the High Court but was unsuccessful.

In a separate legal case, his family also took action around Knowsley Council's attempt to get he and his girlfriend to move to a smaller property under the Bedroom tax welfare policy. This action against this was successful as the family proved that each of the four bedrooms was in use - one for Neil in a specially adapted bed, one for his partner, one for a lift to get Neil upstairs, and one for his live-in carer.
