= Paul Rutherford (footballer) =

English footballer

Personal information
- Full name: Paul Leslie Rutherford
- Date of birth: 10 July 1987 (age 39)
- Place of birth: Moreton, England
- Height: 1.75 m (5 ft 9 in)
- Position: Midfielder

Youth career
- Liverpool
- 2003–2005: Chester City

Senior career*
Years	Team	Apps	(Gls)
2005–2009	Chester City	57	(1)
2009–2013	Barrow	164	(9)
2013–2016	Southport	98	(5)
2016–2021	Wrexham	186	(8)
2021–2023	Bala Town	52	(3)
- * Club domestic league appearances and goals as of 26 June 2023

Paul Leslie Rutherford (born 10 July 1987) is an English footballer who plays as a winger.

== Career ==
Born in Moreton, Wirral, he was brought up through the ranks in Liverpool's academy with his brother John before joining Chester City.

In 2005, he signed his first professional contract after impressing in Chester City's Youth Team.

He made his First Team début for Chester City against Cambridge United in the Football League Trophy in 2005 and over the past few years has been involved in first–team duties. He scored his first league goal in the 2–1 win over Darlington on 22 March 2008.

Rutherford was part of the Barrow side who won the 2009-10 FA Trophy at Wembley against Stevenage Borough 2–1.

On 25 June 2013, Rutherford signed for Southport.

On 23 May 2016, Rutherford signed for Wrexham. He made his debut for the club on the opening day of the 2016–17 season, in a 0–0 draw with Dover Athletic, scoring his first goal for the club in their following match with a 93rd minute winning goal during a 3–2 victory over Guiseley. On 2 June 2021, it was announced that Rutherford would leave Wrexham after spending five years at the club. He features prominently in the first two episodes of the documentary series Welcome to Wrexham, where he is shown getting a red card that is implied to cost the team the playoff spot and the reason for his dismissal; despite the unfortunate circumstances, Rutherford maintains his support for both the club and the documentary, saying that the latter is "arguably one of the best things that's happened to [him]", and that "it probably makes [his] career look better".

On 25 June 2021, Rutherford signed for Bala Town. He made his European debut in July 2021, as Bala lost 2–0 on aggregate to Larne in the Europa Conference League.

In 2023, Rutherford returned to representing Wrexham in The Soccer Tournament.

== Career statistics ==
As of end of season 2021/22

Appearances and goals by club, season and competition
Club	Season	League			National Cup		League Cup		Other		Total	
Club	Season	Division	Apps	Goals	Apps	Goals	Apps	Goals	Apps	Goals	Apps	Goals
Chester City	2005–06	League Two	6	0	0	0	0	0	1	0	7	0
Chester City	2006–07	League Two	9	0	0	0	1	0	1	0	11	0
Chester City	2007–08	League Two	23	1	1	0	1	0	1	0	26	1
Chester City	2008–09	League Two	19	0	1	0	0	0	0	0	25	0
Chester City	Total		57	1	2	0	2	0	3	0	69	1
Barrow	2009–10	Conference National	38	0	4	0	—		0	0	42	0
Barrow	2010–11	Conference National	42	7	1	0	—		1	0	44	7
Barrow	2011–12	Conference National	40	1	2	1	—		2	0	44	2
Barrow	2012–13	Conference National	44	1	5	0	—		4	0	53	1
Barrow	Total		164	9	12	1	—		7	0	183	10
Southport	2013–14	Conference National	18	0	1	0	—		1	0	20	0
Southport	2014–15	Conference National	40	3	6	0	—		2	0	48	3
Southport	2015–16	National League	40	2	1	0	—		3	0	44	2
Southport	Total		98	5	8	0	—		6	0	112	5
Wrexham	2016–17	National League	39	2	0	0	—		0	0	39	2
Wrexham	2017–18	National League	43	2	1	0	—		0	0	44	3
Wrexham	2018–19	National League	44	1	5	0	—		3	1	52	1
Wrexham	2019–20	National League	33	2	4	0	—		1	0	38	2
Wrexham	2020–21	National League	27	0	0	0	—		1	0	28	0
Wrexham	Total		186	8	10	0	—		5	1	202	9
Bala Town	2021–22	Cymru Premier	28	3	3	1	2	1	2	0	32	5
Total			528	31	34	2	4	1	24	1	590	35
