= Paul McManus =

English footballer (born 1990)

Personal information
- Date of birth: 22 April 1990 (age 36)
- Place of birth: Liverpool, England
- Position: Forward

Youth career
- 2006–2007: Chester City

Senior career*
Years	Team	Apps	(Gls)
2007–2009	Chester City	27	(3)
2009	Bangor City	14	(2)
2009–2011	Airbus UK Broughton	42	(4)
2012–2016	Rhyl	48	(12)
2015–2016	→ Flint Town United (loan)	17	(5)
2016–	Runcorn Town	152	(24)
- * Club domestic league appearances and goals as of 19:51, 19 February 2016 (UTC)

Paul James McManus (born 22 April 1990) is an English footballer.

== Career ==
McManus was a product of Chester City's youth system and a prolific scoring record for the youth and reserve sides persuaded Bobby Williamson to hand McManus a professional contract on 2 October 2007. Highlights of his early time at the club included scoring the shock winner for Chester's youngsters against Tottenham Hotspur in the FA Youth Cup in December 2006 and a hat-trick against Carlisle United in a reserve fixture in September 2007.

He made his Football League debut as a late substitute in a 3–1 home win over Shrewsbury Town on 7 October 2007, becoming the first player born in the 1990s to make a first-team appearance for Chester. He is one of several homegrown players to appear for the first-team this season. He made his first starting appearance in the first–team in a Football League Trophy tie away at Carlisle United two nights later and remained in the first–team squad for most of the season. In the closing weeks of the 2007–2008 season he played regularly in attack, scoring his first league goal in a 2–1 loss to Lincoln City on 12 April 2008.

The following season saw McManus scored successive equalisers for Chester against Shrewsbury Town and Luton Town in September but he was allowed to move to Bangor City shortly before the transfer window closed on 2 February 2009. He made 14 appearances during the remainder of the 2008–09 season and also won the Welsh Cup and played in the final of the Welsh League Cup. At the end of the season, he was released by Bangor at the end of the season, moving to Airbus UK Broughton.

In January 2012 he joined Rhyl.

In 2016 McManus signed for Runcorn Town. In February 2019 he became player-manager on a caretaker basis, and was appointed as permanent player-manager prior to the final game of the season.
