= Shaun Kelly =

English footballer

Personal information
- Full name: Shaun David Kelly
- Date of birth: 11 December 1988 (age 37)
- Place of birth: Liverpool, England
- Height: 1.85 m (6 ft 1 in)
- Position: Defender

Team information
- Current team: City of Liverpool

Youth career
- 2005–2007: Chester City

Senior career*
Years	Team	Apps	(Gls)
2007–2010	Chester City	39	(1)
2007	→ Vauxhall Motors (loan)	4	(0)
2010	Burton Albion	4	(0)
2010–2012	Bala Town		
2012	Shepparton United	8	(4)
2012–2014	South Melbourne	18	(7)
2012	FC Halifax Town (loan)	1	(1)
2015–2016	Port Melbourne Sharks	41	(2)
2017–2019	Dandenong City	24	(3)
2019–2021	Bala Town	16	(0)
2021–	City of Liverpool		
- * Club domestic league appearances and goals as of 22:02, 15 September 2021 (UTC)

Shaun Kelly (born 11 December 1988) is a professional footballer who plays for City of Liverpool in the Northern Premier League. He has played in Australia with Shepparton United, South Melbourne FC & Port Melbourne Sharks as well as in the English Football League with Chester City F.C., and various other English non-league sides. He now works as a physiotherapist within the UK specialising in gubbins and MSK

== Playing career ==
Kelly is a product of Chester's youth system and made his Football League debut as a late substitute against Shrewsbury Town F.C. on 15 April 2007.

In September 2007, Kelly joined Conference North side Vauxhall Motors F.C. on loan to gain first-team experience.

He returned to Chester during the season and replaced Paul Butler at half-time in their 3–3 draw with Accrington Stanley F.C. on 5 January 2008, going on to play regularly in the closing stages of the season.

The following season brought 27 league appearances as Chester suffered relegation, with his first goal coming in a 2–1 win at Darlington F.C. on 25 November 2008.

He left the club in early 2010, as Chester were expelled from the Conference.

He joined Port Vale on trial in March 2010 and put in an impressive display in a 2–1 home win for the reserves over Burton Albion, also managing to get onto the score sheet. The performance impressed Burton manager Paul Peschisolido enough to offer him a contract until the end of the season. Burton later announced that the deal could not be completed on the planned day. Kelly joined Welsh Premier League side Bala Town in July 2010, playing with them until he relocated to Australia and joined Shepparton United SC.

In July 2012 he joined South Melbourne FC as a mid-season signing and managed to win the club's Golden Boot award that year playing as centre back.

In October 2012 he returned to England signing for FC Halifax Town but returned to South Melbourne for the 2013 new season. Kelly missed the entire 2014 season due to a broken bone in his foot and left the club at the end of that year.

Kelly joined Port Melbourne SC ahead of the 2015 season where he was appointed captain.

Following the 2016 season, Kelly joined National Premier Leagues Victoria 2 side Dandenong City SC

He signed for Northern Premier League Division One West side City of Liverpool on a free transfer in August 2021.

== Personal life ==
His younger brother James is a former youth player with Bolton Wanderers and is also currently his teammate at Dandenong City.
