= Glenn Rule =

English footballer

Personal information
- Full name: Glenn Paul Rule
- Date of birth: 30 November 1989 (age 36)
- Place of birth: Birkenhead, England
- Positions: Midfielder; full back

Youth career
- 2006–2007: Chester City

Senior career*
| Years | Team | Apps | (Gls) |
| 2007–2010 | Chester City | 26 | (0) |
| 2010 | Colwyn Bay | 0 | (0) |
| 2010–2011 | Stalybridge Celtic | 30 | (0) |
| 2011–2015 | Airbus UK | 104 | (12) |
| 2015–2017 | Stockport County | 23 | (2) |
| 2017 | Airbus UK | 11 | (0) |
| 2017–2018 | Bala Town | 19 | (0) |
| 2018–2019 | Stalybridge Celtic | 29 | (0) |
| 2019– | Vauxhall Motors | | |
| 2021–? | City of Liverpool | | |
- * Club domestic league appearances and goals as of 00:04, 14 August 2019 (UTC)

Glenn Paul Rule (born 30 November 1989) is a professional footballer who plays as a midfielder or full back.

== Career ==
Born in Birkenhead, Rule attended Woodchurch High School between 2001 and 2006. When he left Woodchurch he signed a youth contract at Chester City and was one of several youngsters who graduated to the first-team squad after 2007. He made his debut as a substitute against Carlisle United in October 2007 as a 17-year-old. His English Football League debut arrived with a starting place at Morecambe on 26 December 2007 and he ended the campaign with four league outings to his name. His first appearance of the following season saw him play at full–back in Chester's 2–1 home defeat by Port Vale on 19 October 2008, going on to enjoy 22 league outings during a campaign which ended in relegation from Football League Two.

Rule was involved in the Chester youth sides that made the fourth round of the FA Youth Cup in both 2006–07 and 2007–08.

He joined Colwyn Bay in 2010, before moving to Stalybridge Celtic. In June 2011 he joined Airbus UK.

On 11 June 2015, Rule joined Stockport County for an undisclosed fee. He received a 10 match ban for allegedly biting an opponent in September 2015.

In January 2017, Rule rejoined Airbus UK. He left the club at the end of the season, signing for Bala Town.

In July 2018 he rejoined former club Stalybridge Celtic.

In 2019, Rule signed for Vauxhall Motors and scored on his debut against Abbey Hey.

In October 2021 he joined City of Liverpool.
