= Timeline of British history (1970–1989) =

This article presents a timeline of events in the history of the United Kingdom from 1970 until 1989. For a narrative explaining the overall developments, see the related history of the British Isles. For narratives about this time period, see Post-war Britain (1945–1979), Social history of post-war Britain (1945–1979), Political history of the United Kingdom (1979–present) and Social history of the United Kingdom (1979–present)

== United Kingdom ==
1970s
1970
1971
1972
1973
1974
1975
1976
1977
1978
1979

1980s
1980
1981
1982
1983
1984
1985
1986
1987
1988
1989

=== England ===
1970s
1970
1971
1972
1973
1974
1975
1976
1977
1978
1979

1980s
1980
1981
1982
1983
1984
1985
1986
1987
1988
1989

=== Scotland ===
1970s
1970
1971
1972
1973
1974
1975
1976
1977
1978
1979

1980s
1980
1981
1982
1983
1984
1985
1986
1987
1988
1989

=== Wales ===
1970s
1970
1971
1972
1973
1974
1975
1976
1977
1978
1979

1980s
1980
1981
1982
1983
1984
1985
1986
1987
1988
1989

== See also ==
- History of England
- History of Northern Ireland
- History of Scotland
- History of Wales
- History of the United Kingdom
