= 1975 in Wales =

- Centuries: 18th; 19th; 20th; 21st
- Decades: 1950s; 1960s; 1970s; 1980s; 1990s
- See also: List of years in Wales; Timeline of Welsh history 1975 in The United Kingdom Scotland Elsewhere

This article is about the particular significance of the year 1975 to Wales and its people.

== Incumbents ==
- Secretary of State for Wales – John Morris
- Archbishop of Wales – Gwilym Williams, Bishop of Bangor
- Archdruid of the National Eisteddfod of Wales
  - Brinli (outgoing)
  - Bryn (incoming)

== Events ==
- 20 March - Opening of the Cleddau Bridge at Milford Haven.
- 14 April - Actor/singer Michael Flanders dies suddenly of an intracranial berry aneurysm while on holiday in Betws-y-Coed.
- May - A leak from the Esso Tenby tanker off the coast of Pembrokeshire kills an estimated 1,300 seabirds.
- 28 July - Eight people are injured when a train is derailed between Sarnau and St Clears.
- 19 November - The Wales national football team qualifies for the quarter-finals of UEFA Euro 1976, beating Austria 1-0 in Wrexham.
- date unknown - The Glamorgan-Gwent Archaeological Trust is established.

== Arts and literature ==
- Ryan and Ronnie announce the end of their comedy partnership.

=== Awards ===
- National Eisteddfod of Wales (held in Criccieth)
- National Eisteddfod of Wales: Chair - Gerallt Lloyd Owen
- National Eisteddfod of Wales: Crown - Elwyn Roberts
- National Eisteddfod of Wales: Prose Medal - withheld

=== New books ===
==== English language ====
- Gwynfor Evans - National Future for Wales
- Jeremy Hooker - Soliloquies of a Chalk Giant
- Emyr Humphries - Flesh and Blood
- Joseph Jenkins - Diary of a Welsh Swagman (posthumous)
- Richard Llewellyn - Green, Green, My Valley Now
- Moelwyn Merchant - Breaking the Code
- Prys Morgan - Iolo Morganwg
- Bernice Rubens - I Sent a Letter to My Love
- Peter Tinniswood - Except You're a Bird
- Rhydwen Williams - The Angry Vineyard

==== Welsh language ====
- Aneirin Talfan Davies - Diannerch Erchwyn a Cherddi Eraill
- T. Glynne Davies - Marged
- Richard Cyril Hughes - Catrin o Ferain
- T. Llew Jones - Tân ar y Comin
- Alan Llwyd - Edrych Trwy Wydrau Lledrith
- Marged Pritchard - Gwylanod ar y Mynydd
- Gwyn Thomas - Y Pethau Diwethaf a Phethau Eraill

=== New drama ===
- W. S. Jones - Y Toblarôn
- Saunders Lewis - Dwy Briodas Ann

=== Music ===
- Max Boyce - We All Had Doctors' Papers
- Edward H. Dafis - Ffordd Newydd Eingl-Americanaidd Grêt o Fyw
- Dave Edmunds - Subtle As A Flying Mallet
- Andy Fairweather-Low - La Booga Rooga, album featuring the top ten hit single "Wide Eyed and Legless"

== Film ==
- Rachel Roberts appears in Picnic at Hanging Rock.
- Ken Loach's Days of Hope is partly set in Wales.

=== Welsh-language films ===
- None

== Broadcasting ==
=== Welsh-language television ===
- The Siberry Report recommends a new Welsh-language fourth channel broadcasting 25 hours a week of Welsh-language programmes, with BBC and HTV each responsible for 50% of the output.
- Llon a Llywd with Olween Rees
- Bilidowcar with Marged Esli
- Pili Pala with Myfanwy Talog

=== English-language television ===
- Grand Slam, starring Hugh Griffith and Windsor Davies
- How Green Was My Valley adapted for television by Elaine Morgan, starring Stanley Baker, Sian Phillips, Mike Gwilym, Nerys Hughes and Gareth Thomas.
- Angharad Rees stars in Poldark.

== Sport ==
- Boxing – Pat Thomas wins the British Welterweight title.
- Darts – Wales win the Home International Series.
- Football – The Wales national football team qualifies for the quarter-finals of UEFA Euro 1976.
- Snooker – Ray Reardon wins his fourth World Championship title.
- Arfon Griffiths wins BBC Wales Sports Personality of the Year.

== Births ==
- 12 March - Richard Harrington, actor
- 21 March - Mark Williams, snooker player
- 5 April - John Hartson, footballer
- 16 April - Euros Childs, alternative rock singer-songwriter and keyboardist
- 22 May - Kelly Morgan, badminton player
- 18 June - Jem, hip-hop singer-songwriter
- 24 July - Dafydd James, rugby player
- 4 September - Kai Owen, actor
- 26 September - Dai Thomas, footballer
- 19 October - Jamie Donaldson, golfer
- 28 October - Adrian Durston, rugby player
- 5 November - Lisa Scott-Lee, pop singer
- 25 November - Paul Mealor, composer
- date unknown - Cynan Jones, novelist

== Deaths ==
- 14 February - Arthur Probert, politician, 67
- 23 February - Ossie Male, rugby player, 81
- 3 March - T. H. Parry-Williams, poet, 87
- 15 March - Edward James, cricketer, 78
- 6 April - Tom Morgan, cricketer, 81
- 23 April - Pete Ham, musician, leader of the group Badfinger (suicide), 27
- 24 April - Stephen Halden Beattie, recipient of the Victoria Cross, 67
- 21 May - A. H. Dodd, historian, 83
- 7 June - Jack Smith, footballer, 63
- 8 July - T. G. E. Powell, archaeologist, 59
- 7 August - Jim Griffiths, politician, 84
- 27 August - Noel Morgan, cricketer, 69
- 4 September - Walley Barnes, footballer and broadcaster, 55
- 5 October - Will Davies, rugby player, 69
- 6 November - Norman Riches, cricketer
- 10 November - Emrys Davies, cricketer, 71
- 18 December - R. Ifor Parry, minister, teacher and philanthropist, 67
- date unknown
  - Robert Herring, poet and critic, 72
  - Alun Jeremiah Jones (Alun Cilie), poet
  - Huw Lloyd Edwards, dramatist

== See also ==
- 1975 in Northern Ireland
