= 1976 in Wales =

- Centuries: 18th; 19th; 20th; 21st
- Decades: 1950s; 1960s; 1970s; 1980s; 1990s
- See also: List of years in Wales; Timeline of Welsh history 1976 in The United Kingdom Scotland Elsewhere

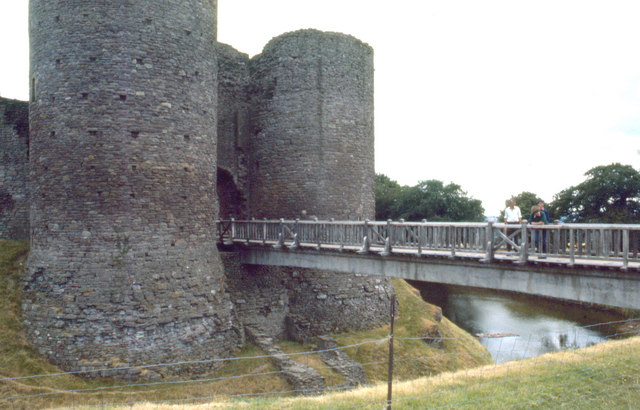
White Castle in 1976

This article is about the particular significance of the year 1976 to Wales and its people.

== Incumbents ==
- Secretary of State for Wales – John Morris
- Archbishop of Wales – Gwilym Williams, Bishop of Bangor
- Archdruid of the National Eisteddfod of Wales – Bryn

== Events ==
- 9 February - The Prince of Wales (now Charles III) becomes commander of HMS Bronington.
- 17 February - Operation Julie is launched; it eventually results in the break-up of one of the largest LSD manufacturing operations in the world.
- March - The Welsh Regional Office of the European Community opens in Cardiff.
- June–September - 1976 United Kingdom heat wave: A very hot summer brings a major drought with water shortages.
- July - Miners’ leader Dai Francis challenges the Prince of Wales (now Charles III), in the election for Chancellor of the University of Wales.
- 25 July - Former Submarine Commander Neil Rutherford, DSC & Bar, murders four people at the Red Gables Hotel in Penmaenmawr.
- 4 October - The InterCity 125 high speed train runs for the first time between Swansea railway station and London Paddington.
- 7 December - Swansea-born former fashion model Lilian Davies marries Prince Bertil of Sweden at Drottningholm Palace after a 30-year relationship.
- date unknown - David Emanuel marries Elizabeth Weiner.

== Arts and literature ==
- May 27 - Actor Stanley Baker is given a knighthood in the Prime Minister's Resignation Honours, a few months before his death.
- August - Dic Jones loses the National Eisteddfod chair on a technicality.
- October - Mistar Urdd is created by Wynne Melville Jones.
- unknown date - Griff Rhys Jones becomes Vice-President of the Cambridge University Footlights Dramatic Club.

=== Awards ===
- National Eisteddfod of Wales (held in Cardigan)
- National Eisteddfod of Wales: Chair - Alan Llwyd
- National Eisteddfod of Wales: Crown - Alan Llwyd
- National Eisteddfod of Wales: Prose Medal - Marged Prichard

=== New books ===
==== English language ====
- Ruth Bidgood - Not Without Homage
- Glyn Davies - Overseas Investment In Wales
- Kenneth O. Morgan - Keir Hardie
- Bernice Rubens - I Sent a Letter to My Love

==== Welsh language ====
- John Emyr - Enaid Clwyfus
- Alun Llywelyn-Williams - Gwanwyn yn y Ddinas
- Owain Owain - Y Dydd Olaf

=== Poetry ===
- J. M. Edwards - Cerddi Ddoe a Heddiw - Egin
- Donald Evans
- Geraint Jarman - Cerddi Alfred Street
- Gwilym R. Jones - Y Syrcas a Cherddi Eraill

=== New drama ===
- John Gwilym Jones - Gobaith Mawr y Ganrif

=== Music ===
- Edward H. Dafis - 'Sneb yn Becso Dam
- Alun Hoddinott - Murder the Magician (opera)
- Dafydd Iwan - Mae'r Darnau yn Disgyn i'w Lle (album)
- Geraint Jarman - Gobaith Mawr y Ganrif (album)
- Daniel Jones - Dance Fantasy
- Man - The Welsh Connection
- Bonnie Tyler - "Lost in France" (debut single)

== Film ==
=== Welsh-language films ===
- Y Dieithryn, produced by Emlyn Williams

== Broadcasting ==
- Sir Huw Wheldon is knighted for his services to broadcasting.

=== Welsh-language television ===
- Seren Wib, presented by Emyr Glasnant and Sharon Morgan
- Tybed? with Marged Esli
- Mae Gen i Stori

=== Welsh language radio ===
- Tros Fy Sbectol

=== English-language television ===
- How Green Was My Father: a Welsh Odyssey for 1976, with Ryan Davies and Max Boyce

== Sport ==
- Football – The Wales national football team plays in the quarter-finals of UEFA Euro 1976.
- BBC Wales Sports Personality of the Year – Mervyn Davies and the Wales national rugby union team.
- Rugby union – Wales win their seventh Grand Slam.
- Snooker
  - 30 January – Ray Reardon wins the Masters.
  - 23 April – Ray Reardon wins his fifth World Championship title.

== Births ==
- 14 January - Scott Young, footballer
- 6 April - James Fox, singer
- 8 May - Ian Watkins, pop singer
- 13 May - Mark Delaney, footballer
- 16 June - Cian Ciaran, musician
- 25 June - Iestyn Harris, rugby player
- 14 July - Geraint Jones, cricketer
- 9 August - Aled Haydn-Jones, radio producer
- 1 November - Buffy Williams, politician
- 7 November - Andrew Davies, cricketer
- 20 December – Adam Powell, inventor
- date unknown - Steffan Cravos, musician and language activist

== Deaths ==
- 3 January – Mal Evans, Beatles' former roadie and patron of Badfinger, 40 (shot)
- 23 January – Sir Tudor Thomas, ophthalmic surgeon, 82
- 26 January – Eric Francis, architect, 88
- 4 February – Roger Livesey, actor, 69
- 12 February – John Lewis, Marxist philosopher, 87
- 14 February - Tommy Scourfield, dual code rugby player, 66
- 29 March - Harold Davies, rugby player, 77
- 26 March - Duster Bennett, blues musician, 29 (car accident)
- 30 March - Jackie Mittell, footballer, 70
- 31 March - Billy Moore, rugby player, 66
- 18 April – Haydn Davies, politician, 70
- 28 April – Richard Hughes, novelist, 76
- 6 June – David Jacobs, athlete, 88
- 20 June – Sir Goronwy Edwards, historian, 84
- 28 June – Sir Stanley Baker, actor, 48
- 18 July – Jenkin Alban Davies, Wales international rugby captain, 90
- 22 July – Willie Evans, Welsh international footballer, 63
- 30 August - David Rees-Williams, 1st Baron Ogmore, politician, 72
- 10 October - David Lewis, 1st Baron Brecon, politician, 71
- 7 November - Glyn Davies, Wales international rugby union player, 49
- 22 November - Rupert Davies, actor, 60 (cancer)
- 24 November - Ambrose Baker, rugby player, ?79
- date unknown
  - Eveline Annie Jenkins, botanical artist, 82/83
  - Meirion Williams, songwriter

== See also ==
- 1976 in Northern Ireland
