= 1978 in Wales =

- Centuries: 18th; 19th; 20th; 21st
- Decades: 1950s; 1960s; 1970s; 1980s; 1990s
- See also: List of years in Wales; Timeline of Welsh history 1978 in The United Kingdom Scotland Elsewhere

This article is about the particular significance of the year 1978 to Wales and its people.

== Incumbents ==
- Secretary of State for Wales – John Morris
- Archbishop of Wales – Gwilym Williams, Bishop of Bangor
- Archdruid of the National Eisteddfod of Wales
  - Bryn (outgoing)
  - Geraint (Bowen) (incoming)

== Events ==
- March - Moss Evans is elected leader of the Transport and General Workers Union.
- March/April - Closure of the steelworks in Ebbw Vale and East Moors.
- unknown dates
  - The Welsh Office is given responsibility for further and higher education in Wales.
  - The National Language Centre is established at Nant Gwrtheyrn in the Lleyn peninsula.

== Arts and literature ==
- Richard Burton records the narrative for the concept album Jeff Wayne's Musical Version of The War of the Worlds.
- Operatic contralto Helen Watts is appointed a CBE.
- Gregynog Press is reincarnated as "Gwasg Gregynog".

=== Awards ===
- National Eisteddfod of Wales (held in Cardiff)
- National Eisteddfod of Wales: Chair - withheld
- National Eisteddfod of Wales: Crown - Siôn Eirian
- National Eisteddfod of Wales: Prose Medal - Harri Williams

=== New books ===
==== English language ====
- Ruth Bidgood - The Print of Miracle
- Ken Follett - Eye of the Needle
- James Hanley - A Kingdom
- Robert Minhinnick - A Thread in the Maze
- John Tripp - Collected Poems
- Gwyn A. Williams - The Merthyr Rising

==== Welsh language ====
- Marion Eames - I Hela Cnau
- Gwyn Thomas - Croesi Traeth
- T. Arfon Williams - Englynion Arfon

=== Music ===
- Dave Edmunds - Tracks on Wax 4
- Geraint Jarman - Hen Wlad Fy Nhadau

== Film ==
- Kenneth Griffith appears with Richard Burton in The Wild Geese.

== Broadcasting ==
=== Welsh-language television ===
- Shane becomes the first film to be dubbed into the Welsh language for television.
- Bys a Bawd with Marged Esli.
- Pippi Hosanhir

=== English-language television ===
- 17 March - BBC Wales comedy film Grand Slam stars Hugh Griffith and Windsor Davies.
- BBC Wales drama serial Hawkmoor, based on the life of Twm Siôn Cati, stars John Ogwen and Jane Asher.
- Elaine Morgan's adaptation of Off to Philadelphia in the Morning, the novel by Jack Jones, stars David Lyn as Joseph Parry and Connie Booth as his wife, Jane. Meredith Edwards, Rachel Thomas and William Squire also appear.

=== English-language radio ===
- 13 November - BBC Radio Wales is launched, following the demise of the 'Radio 4 Wales' service (previously the Welsh Home Service). The first show is AM, presented by Anita Morgan.

== Sport ==
- BBC Wales Sports Personality of the Year – Johnny Owen
- Boxing – Johnny Owen wins the Commonwealth bantamweight title.
- Darts – Leighton Rees wins the World Professional Darts Championship.
- Rugby union – Wales win their eighth Grand Slam.
- Snooker
  - 29 April – Ray Reardon wins the World Championship for the sixth time.
  - 1 December – Doug Mountjoy wins the UK Snooker Championship in Preston.

== Births ==
- 21 January - Rachael Bland, née Hodges, broadcast journalist (died 2018)
- 1 February - David Hughes, footballer
- 12 February - Gethin Jones, television presenter
- 26 July - Eve Myles, actress
- 2 September - Matthew Watkins, rugby union player (died 2020)
- 17 November - Tom Ellis, actor
- 25 December - Simon Jones, cricketer
- date unknown
  - David Llewellyn, fiction writer
  - Rachel Trezise, fiction writer

== Deaths ==
- 6 January - Ted Jones, trade union leader, 81
- 11 January - William John Edwards, Cerdd Dant singer, 79
- 17 February - Joseph Owen, cricketer, 69
- 20 February - Tom Jones, footballer, 88
- 23 February - Arwyn Davies, Baron Arwyn, politician, 80
- 24 February - David Williams, historian, 78
- 2 March - Frances Williams, composer,
- 6 March - David Price-White, lawyer and politician, 71
- 4 April - Sir Morien Morgan, aeronautics engineer, 65
- 9 April - Sir Clough Williams-Ellis, architect, 94
- 13 April - William Rees-Thomas, psychiatrist, 90
- 14 April - Thomas Hollingdale, Wales rugby union international, 77
- 16 April - Eddie Morgan, Wales international rugby player, 64
- 25 April - Harry Griffiths, footballer and manager, 47
- 18 May - Selwyn Lloyd, politician, 73
- 2 July - Philip Scott Yorke, last Squire of Erddig, 73
- 21 August - Rhys Davies, 76, novelist and short story writer
- 25 August - Tyssul Griffiths, rugby player, 59
- 4 September – Leonora Cohen, suffragette, trade unionist and feminist, 105
- 12 September - Bobby Delahay, Wales rugby union captain, 78
- 13 November - W. S. Gwynn Williams, composer, 82
- 23 November - Edward Jones, 82, cricketer
- 16 December - Harry Phillips, Wales international rugby player, 75

== See also ==
- 1978 in Northern Ireland
