= 1983 in Wales =

- Centuries: 18th; 19th; 20th; 21st
- Decades: 1960s; 1970s; 1980s; 1990s; 2000s
- See also: List of years in Wales; Timeline of Welsh history 1983 in The United Kingdom England Scotland Elsewhere

This article is about the particular significance of the year 1983 to Wales and its people.

== Incumbents ==
- Secretary of State for Wales – Nicholas Edwards
- Archbishop of Wales – Derrick Childs, Bishop of Monmouth (elected)
- Archdruid of the National Eisteddfod of Wales – Jâms Nicholas

== Events ==
- 5 May - District council elections take place across Wales (and England). The Conservatives regain control of Cardiff City Council.
- 9 June - In the UK General Election.
  - The SDP, led by Roy Jenkins, allies with the Liberals and gains fourteen seats.
  - Stefan Terlezki becomes MP for Cardiff West.
  - Plaid Cymru retains two seats.
  - John Marek is elected for Wrexham, becoming the only Czech-speaking MP.
  - Geraint Howells retains Ceredigion for the Liberals.
- 21 June - Last coal raised at Tymawr and Lewis Merthyr Colliery.
- September - The Prince Willem-Alexander of the Netherlands, heir to the Dutch throne, begins a two-year course of study at Atlantic College.
- 5 September - Marcher Sound is launched on 1260 AM and 95.4 FM (now BBC Radio Wales) from Wrexham, inaugurating the Marcher Radio Group.
- 2 October - Neil Kinnock, 41-year-old MP for Islwyn, replaces Michael Foot as leader of the UK Labour Party.
- The BBC National Chorus of Wales is formed.

== Arts and literature ==
=== Awards ===
- National Eisteddfod of Wales (held in Llangefni)
- National Eisteddfod of Wales: Chair - Einion Evans
- National Eisteddfod of Wales: Crown - Eluned Phillips
- National Eisteddfod of Wales: Prose Medal - Tudor Wilson Evans
- National Eisteddfod of Wales: Drama Medal - William Owen

=== New books ===
==== English language ====
- Walter Hugh Boore - The Odyssey of Dai Lewis
- Rachel Bromwich - Dafydd ap Gwilym: Poems
- Alice Thomas Ellis - The 27th Kingdom
- Emyr Humphreys – The Taliesin Tradition
- Nigel Jenkins - Practical Dreams
- Robert Nisbet - Stories of Sheepskin
- Craig Thomas - Firefox Down

==== Welsh language ====
- Marion Eames - Y Gaeaf Sydd Unig
- Donald Evans – Machlud Canrif
- R. Tudur Jones - Ffydd ac Argyfwng Cenedl
- Alan Llwyd - Yn Nydd yr Anghenfil

=== New drama ===
- W. S. Jones - Ifas y tryc

=== Music ===
- The Alarm - "Sixty Eight Guns" (#17 in the UK Singles Chart)
- Y Cyrff form at Llanrwst
- First Cardiff Singer of the World competition, won by Finnish soprano Karita Mattila
- "Yma o Hyd" is released by Dafydd Iwan and Ar Log

== Film ==
- Owen Glendower, Prince of Wales (TV film), starring David Barry

=== Welsh-language films ===
- Yr Alcoholig Llon

== Broadcasting ==
=== Welsh-language television ===
- Torri Gwynt

=== English-language television ===
- QED: Simon's War (about Simon Weston)

== Sport ==
- BBC Wales Sports Personality of the Year – Colin Jones
- Boxing - David Pearce of Newport wins the British heavyweight title.

== Births ==
- 11 January
  - Rhodri Gomer-Davies, rugby player and reporter
- 14 February - Rhydian Roberts, singer
- 18 February - David Vaughan, footballer
- 5 March - Owain Arthur, actor
- 28 March - Richard Jones, chess master
- 13 April - Nicole Cooke, cyclist
- 12 May - Jamie Tolley, footballer
- 7 June - Gareth Jewell, actor
- 9 June
  - Kate Alicia Morgan, beauty queen
  - Ryan Watkins, cricketer
- 11 June - Huw Bennett, rugby player
- 19 June - Richard Evans, footballer
- 22 July - Ifan Evans, rugby player
- 6 August - Lloyd Langford, comedian
- 10 August - Richie Pugh, rugby player and coach
- 23 August - James Collins, footballer
- 26 August - Darren Jones, footballer
- 9 October - Rianti Cartwright, half-Welsh actress (in Indonesia)
- 5 November - David Pipe, footballer

== Deaths ==
- 5 January - Amy Evans, singer and actress, 98
- 10 January (in Amsterdam) - Carwyn James, rugby coach, 53
- 31 January - Edwin Williams, dual-code rugby international, 84
- 10 February - Michael Roberts, politician, 55 (collapsed in Parliament)
- 3 March - Percy Morgan, cricketer, 78
- 20 March - Alec Jones, politician, 58
- 23 March - David Wynne, composer, 82
- 16 April - Gladys Morgan, comedienne, 84
- 6 June - Bryn Howells, dual-code rugby player, 72
- 23 June - Emrys Evans, dual-code rugby player, 72
- 31 August - Iorwerth Jones, dual-code rugby player, 80
- 1 September - John Williams, Dean of Llandaff, 76
- 9 September - Edgar Morgan, dual-code rugby international, 87
- 1 October - Ernie Finch, Wales international rugby player, 84
- 8 October - Ron Wynn, footballer, 59
- 24 October - Norman Fender, Wales dual-code rugby international, 73
- 2 November - Tudor Watkins, politician, 80
- 8 November - E. G. Bowen, geographer, 82
- 15 November (in London) - Dai Rees, golfer, 70
- 30 November - Richard Llewellyn, novelist, 76
- 30 December - Ellis Evans, Dean of Monmouth, 75
- date unknown - Mary Vaughan Jones, novelist, 64/65

== See also ==
- 1983 Cardiff City Council election
- 1983 in Northern Ireland
