= 1980 in Wales =

- Centuries: 18th; 19th; 20th; 21st
- Decades: 1960s; 1970s; 1980s; 1990s; 2000s
- See also: List of years in Wales; Timeline of Welsh history 1980 in The United Kingdom England Scotland Elsewhere

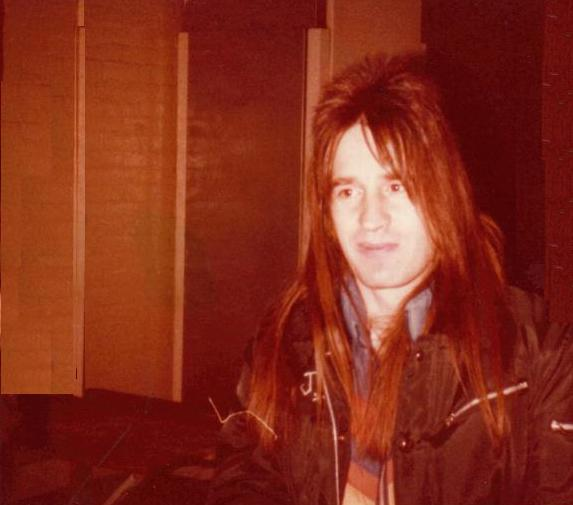
Trevor Bolder Uriah Heep Cardiff 1980

This article is about the particular significance of the year 1980 to Wales and the Welsh people.

== Incumbents ==
- Secretary of State for Wales – Nicholas Edwards
- Archbishop of Wales – Gwilym Williams, Bishop of Bangor
- Archdruid of the National Eisteddfod of Wales – Geraint

== Events ==
- 2 January – Workers at British Steel Corporation go on strike over pay.
- May – Plaid Cymru leader Gwynfor Evans announces his intention to go on hunger strike in protest against the government's failure to honour its promise of a fourth Welsh-language television channel. The government backs down on 17 September, a few weeks before Evans's deadline.
- April – The Church in Wales votes to ordain women deacons.
- 17 May – Glan Clwyd Hospital opens at Bodelwyddan.
- 8 June – Dr Martyn Lloyd-Jones preaches for the last time, at Barcombe Baptist Chapel.
- 28 June – Penelope Clarke of Lanover marries François Fillon, future Prime Minister of France.
- 11 July – Britannia Bridge A55 road deck officially opened by the Prince of Wales (now Charles III).
- August – Dragon Data introduces the Dragon 32 home computer.
- John Maddox becomes editor of Nature.
- Death of last pure-bred Rhiw sheep.
- Cardiff Zoo closed.
- Welsh Highland Railway Ltd begins using the name "Rheilffordd Ucheldir Cymru".

== Arts and literature ==
- Richard Burton makes one of his last stage appearances, in the musical Camelot.
- Michael Bogdanov becomes associate director of the Royal National Theatre.
- Bobi Jones is appointed to the professorial chair in Welsh at University of Wales, Aberystwyth.
- The publisher Gwasg Carreg Gwalch is founded by Myrddin ap Dafydd at Capel Garmon.

=== Awards ===
- National Eisteddfod of Wales (held in Gowerton)
- National Eisteddfod of Wales: Chair - Donald Evans
- National Eisteddfod of Wales: Crown - Donald Evans
- National Eisteddfod of Wales: Prose Medal - R. Gerallt Jones

=== New books ===
- Irma Chilton - Yr Iâr Goch
- Leopold Kohr - Cymru Fach
- D. Tecwyn Lloyd - Bore Da, Lloyd

=== Music ===
- Edward H. Dafis - Plant Y Fflam (album)

=== Works of art ===
- Andrew Vicari - La Marianne

== Film ==
- The Mouse and the Woman, based on a novel by Dylan Thomas, written by Vincent Kane and directed by Karl Francis, co-stars Huw Ceredig, Beti Lloyd-Jones and Dafydd Hywel.
- Dragonslayer is filmed at Dolwyddelan Castle.

== Broadcasting ==
=== English-language television ===
- Ruth Madoc stars in the hit sitcom Hi-de-Hi!

== Sport ==
- BBC Wales Sports Personality of the Year – Duncan Evans
- Boxing
  - 28 February – Johnny Owen defeats Juan Francisco Rodríguez at Ebbw Vale to win the European bantamweight championship.
  - 28 June – Johnny Owen defeats John Feeny at the Empire Pool, Wembley.
  - 19 September – Johnny Owen fights Lupe Pintor in Los Angeles. Owen is knocked out and goes into a coma from which he never emerges, being pronounced dead on 4 November.
- Rugby union
  - Fifteen Welsh players are included in the squad of 38 for the 1980 British Lions tour to South Africa: Elgan Rees, Ray Gravell, David Richards, Peter Morgan, Gareth Davies, Terry Holmes, Clive Williams, Ian Stephens, Graham Price, Alan Phillips, Allan Martin, Jeff Squire, Stuart Lane, Derek Quinnell and Gareth Powell Williams.
  - 18 October – 1 November: 1980 New Zealand rugby union tour of Wales
    - 1 November: Wales 3–23 New Zealand
- Snooker
  - 9 February – Terry Griffiths wins the Masters, defeating Ray Reardon in an all-Welsh final.

== Births ==
- 20 January – Matthew Tuck, vocalist
- 28 February – Katy Wix, actress
- 23 March – Ryan Day, snooker player
- 29 March – Andy Scott-Lee, singer
- 7 April – Carl Fletcher, footballer
- 10 April – Daniel Hawksford, actor
- 12 April – Sara Head, table tennis player
- 15 April – Stephen Doughty, politician
- 26 May – Nick Thomas-Symonds, politician
- 3 June – Lucy Dickenson, charity founder
- 29 June – Katherine Jenkins, singer
- 28 July – Noel Sullivan, pop singer
- 13 August – Bari Morgan, footballer
- 19 August – Paul Parry, footballer
- 20 August – Enzo Maccarinelli, boxer
- 3 November – Elis James, comedian
- 17 November – Gethin Jenkins, rugby player
- 16 December – Kevin Aherne-Evans, footballer
- date unknown – Catrin Finch, harpist

== Deaths ==
- 12 January – Howel Williams, American geologist and volcanologist of Welsh parentage, 81
- 31 January – Arthur "Waring" Bowen, solicitor and charity worker, 57
- 8 February – Miles Thomas, businessman, 82
- 9 February – Tom Macdonald, writer, 79
- 25 February – Caradog Prichard, author, 75
- 20 March – Alun Davies, historian, 63
- 6 May – Bryn Phillips, dual-code rugby international, 79
- 14 May – Hugh Griffith, actor, 67
- 4 June – Don Tarr, Wales international rugby player, 70
- 7 June – Idwal Davies, footballer, 80
- 14 July – Aneirin Talfan Davies, critic and broadcaster, 71
- 15 September – Bill Evans, American jazz pianist of Welsh descent, 51 (drug-related)
- 7 October – Jim Lewis, footballer, 71
- 4 November – Johnny Owen, boxer, 24
- 26 November – Rachel Roberts, actress, 53 (suicide)
- 4 December – James Jones, Archdeacon of Huntingdon, 99
- date unknown
  - Cicely Hey, artist
  - Tom Parri Jones, poet
  - Jack Warner, footballer

== See also ==
- 1980 in Northern Ireland
