= 1977 in Wales =

- Centuries: 18th; 19th; 20th; 21st
- Decades: 1950s; 1960s; 1970s; 1980s; 1990s
- See also: List of years in Wales; Timeline of Welsh history 1977 in The United Kingdom Scotland Elsewhere

This article is about the particular significance of the year 1977 to Wales and its people.

== Incumbents ==
- Secretary of State for Wales – John Morris
- Archbishop of Wales – Gwilym Williams, Bishop of Bangor
- Archdruid of the National Eisteddfod of Wales – Bryn

== Events ==
- 6 January - Roy Jenkins becomes President of the European Commission.
- 26 March - Operation Julie results in the break-up of a drugs ring centred on Llanddewi Brefi and the recovery of 1.5 kg of LSD.
- date unknown
  - The Welsh Health Common Services Authority is created.
  - Opening of the bilingual secondary school, Ysgol Uwchradd Bodedern, on Anglesey.

== Arts and literature ==
=== Awards ===
- Ian Parrott receives the John Edwards Memorial Award from the Guild for the Promotion of Welsh Music.
- Jonathan Pryce wins a Tony award for his performance on Broadway in The Comedians.
- National Eisteddfod of Wales (held in Wrexham)
- National Eisteddfod of Wales: Chair - Donald Evans
- National Eisteddfod of Wales: Crown - Donald Evans
- National Eisteddfod of Wales: Prose Medal - Robert Gerallt Jones
- Wales Book of the Year (Welsh language) - Owain Owain, Mical, (Gwasg Gomer)

=== New books ===
==== English language ====
- Alice Thomas Ellis - The Sin Eater
- Paul Ferris - Dylan Thomas: The Biography
- Raymond Garlick - Incense
- Ellis Peters - A Morbid Taste for Bones (first in the Brother Cadfael series of novels)
- Craig Thomas - Firefox
- Gwyn Alf Williams - Goya and the Impossible Revolution

==== Welsh language ====
- Käte Bosse-Griffiths - Byd y Dyn Hysbys
- Zonia Bowen - Llydaweg i'r Cymro
- Jane Edwards - Dros Fryniau Bro Afallon
- Donald Evans - Egin
- Owain Owain - Mical
- R. J. Rowlands - Cerddi R. J. Rowlands y Bala
- Gwyn Thomas - Cadwynau yn y Meddwl

=== Music ===
- Injaroc - Halen Y Ddaear
- Dafydd Iwan - Carlo a Chaneuon Eraill, I'r Gad
- Punk rock band The Toilets is formed in Rhyl, predecessor of The Alarm.

== Film ==
- Richard Burton receives his sixth Best Actor nomination at the Academy Awards for his role in Equus.

== Broadcasting ==
=== Welsh-language radio ===
- 3 January - BBC Radio Cymru begins broadcasting.

=== Welsh-language television ===
- Glas Y Dorlan (sitcom)
- Sioncyn Sboncyn
- Siangdifang

=== English-language television ===
- Kilvert's Diary

== Architecture ==
- Castell Gyrn (Denbighshire) is built by John Taylor of Chapman Taylor architects for himself.

== Sport ==
- Athletics - The first UK Athletics Championships are held at Cwmbran.
- BBC Wales Sports Personality of the Year – Phil Bennett
- Billiards - Clive Everton reaches the semi-finals of the World Championship.
- Boxing - Johnny Owen wins the British bantamweight title.
- Darts - Wales wins the Home International Series and the first Darts World Cup.
- Fencing - Wales wins the Quadrangular Tournament.
- Greyhound racing - Cardiff Greyhounds closes and the Welsh Greyhound Derby is run for the last time.
- Rugby union - Wales win the Triple Crown.
- Long-distance swimming - David Jones of Port Talbot becomes the first Welshman to swim the Bristol Channel.
- Formation of the Welsh Hang Gliding Association and the Welsh Federation of Coarse Anglers.
- Snooker - Doug Mountjoy wins the Masters, defeating Ray Reardon in an all-Welsh final.

== Births ==
- 3 February - Mike Powell, cricketer
- 26 February - Shane Williams, rugby player
- 4 March - Gareth Wyatt, rugby player
- 16 March - Steve Jones, TV presenter
- 18 March - Alex Jones, TV presenter
- 10 April - David Phelps, sport shooter
- 12 April - Jason Price, footballer
- 20 April - Robert Wilfort, actor
- 27 April - Edward Elwyn Jones, organist and conductor
- 30 April - Robert Evans, playwright
- 13 August - Hefin David, politician (died 2025)
- 11 September
  - Jonny Buckland, English-born rock musician
  - Matthew Stevens, snooker player
- 18 November - Deiniol Jones, rugby player

== Deaths ==
- 10 February - Grace Williams, composer, 70
- 11 February - Thomas Ifor Rees, diplomat, 86
- 22 February - Hubert William Lewis, Victoria Cross recipient, 80
- 5 March - Tom Pryce, Formula One racing driver, 27
- 20 March - Glyn Gething, rugby player, 84
- 25 March - Aubrey Williams, army officer, 88
- 30 March - Sir William Emrys Williams, 80
- 5 April - Meirion Thomas, botanist and plant physiologist, 82
- 18 April - Irene Steer, Olympic swimmer, 87
- 22 April - Ryan Davies, entertainer, 40
- 27 May - Jac L Williams, educationist
- 12 June - Ronnie James, British champion boxer, 59
- 27 June - Bert Day, Wales international rugby union player, 69
- 26 July - Sir Ben Bowen Thomas, civil servant and academic, 78
- 10 August - Watcyn Thomas, rugby player, 71
- 16 August - (at Colchester) Hugh Iorys Hughes, engineer, 75
- 27 September - Llewelyn Wyn Griffith, author of Up to Mametz, 87
- 1 November - Jim Sullivan, rugby league player, 73
- 11 December - Neil Williams, Canadian-born aerobatics pilot, 33
- date unknown - Cecil Smith, footballer

== See also ==
- 1977 in Northern Ireland
