= 1979 in Wales =

- Centuries: 18th; 19th; 20th; 21st
- Decades: 1950s; 1960s; 1970s; 1980s; 1990s
- See also: List of years in Wales; Timeline of Welsh history 1979 in The United Kingdom England Scotland Elsewhere

This article is about the particular significance of the year 1979 to Wales and its people.

== Incumbents ==
- Secretary of State for Wales – John Morris (until 5 May); Nicholas Edwards
- Archbishop of Wales – Gwilym Williams, Bishop of Bangor
- Archdruid of the National Eisteddfod of Wales – Geraint

== Events ==
- 1 March - The devolution referendum rejects the Wales Act 1978 (which would have established a Welsh Assembly) by four to one. The Parliamentary Select Committee on Welsh Affairs is subsequently established.
- 18 May - Annie Powell of Rhondda becomes Britain's first Communist mayor.
- 7 June - In the elections for the European Parliament, Ann Clwyd and Win Griffiths are among the newly elected MEPs. Plaid Cymru win 11.7% of the vote in Wales but win no seats.European Integration and the Nationalities Question. United Kingdom: Taylor & Francis, 2006.
- 8 June - A Cessna aircraft crashes into a mountain in Snowdonia, killing all six occupants.
- 14 August - A rainbow which stretches from the Gwynedd coast to Clwyd persists for over 3 hours, a world record which stands for more than 15 years.
- 12 December - Four holiday homes in rural Wales are the target of arson attacks by Welsh Nationalist political activists.

== Arts and literature ==
=== Awards ===
- Michael Bogdanov is named "Director of the Year" for the Royal Shakespeare Company production of The Taming of the Shrew.
- National Eisteddfod of Wales (held in Caernarfon)
  - National Eisteddfod of Wales: Chair - withheld
  - National Eisteddfod of Wales: Crown - Meirion Evans
  - National Eisteddfod of Wales: Prose Medal - Robyn Lewis

=== New books ===
==== English language ====
- Gillian Clarke - The Sundial
- Wendy Davies - The Llandaff Charters
- Christopher Evans - The Mighty Micro
- Emyr Humphreys - The Best of Friends
- Sian James - A Small Country.
- Tristan Jones - The Incredible Voyage
- Anna Kashfi - Brando for Breakfast
- Leslie Norris - Sliding
- Gwyn Alf Williams - The Merthyr Rising
- Raymond Williams - The Fight for Manod

==== Welsh language ====
- Pennar Davies - Mabinogi Mwys
- Marion Eames - I Hela Cnau
- Dic Jones - Storom Awst
- John Rowlands - Tician, Tician

=== Music ===
- Dave Edmunds - Repeat When Necessary (album)
- Bonnie Tyler - Diamond Cut (album)

== Film ==
- Rachel Roberts wins the BAFTA award for Best Supporting Actress for her role in Yanks.
- Emlyn Williams' play, The Corn is Green, is filmed for the second time, starring Katharine Hepburn.
- A full-scale model of the fictional starship Millennium Falcon is constructed by Marcon Fabrications in the Western Sunderland Flying Boat hangar at Pembroke Dock for the film The Empire Strikes Back (1980).

== Broadcasting ==
- BBC Radio Cymru is launched.
- New Home Secretary William Whitelaw rejects the idea of a Welsh fourth channel on behalf of the Conservative government.

=== English-language television ===
- Colin Jeavons stars in Dennis Potter's classic play, Blue Remembered Hills.

== Sport ==
- BBC Wales Sports Personality of the Year – Terry Griffiths
- Boxing - Pat Thomas wins the British Light-middleweight title
- Rugby union - Wales win the Five Nations Championship and take the Triple Crown.
- Snooker - Terry Griffiths wins the World Championship in his first year as a professional.

== Births ==
- January – Emma Wools, Police and Crime Commissioner for South Wales
- 4 February – Mike Williams, journalist
- 15 February – Josh Low, footballer
- 21 February – Laura Anne Jones MS, politician
- 26 February – Steve Evans, footballer
- 15 April - Luke Evans, actor
- 17 May – Michaela Breeze, weightlifting champion
- 3 June – Christian Malcolm, athlete
- 20 June – Gareth Bowen, rugby union player
- 12 July – Danny Williams, footballer
- 13 July – Craig Bellamy, footballer
- 1 August - Honeysuckle Weeks, actress
- 8 August – Danny Gabbidon, footballer
- 12 September – Chris Hughes, football manager
- 18 September – Rhys Thomas, TV director and producer
- 16 October – Jonathan Edwards, poet
- unknown date – Mark Bowden, composer

== Deaths ==
- January – Dilys Cadwaladr, poet, 76
- 7 February – Charles Tunnicliffe, painter on Anglesey, 77
- 13 February – Eric Newton Griffith-Jones, Welsh-descended lawyer, 65
- 13 March – Tudor Owen, actor, 81
- 15 April (in Surrey) – Eiluned Lewis, novelist, 78
- 14 May – Jean Rhys, novelist, 88
- 9 June – John Morris, Baron Morris of Borth-y-Gest, judge, 82
- 16 July – Harold Finch, politician, 81
- 30 August – C. E. Wynn-Williams, physicist, 76
- 2 September – Ewan Davies, rugby player, 92
- 10 October (in Teddington) – Christopher Evans, computer scientist, 48
- 12 October – Jackie Williams, footballer, 76
- November – Ursula Williams, politician, 83
- 12 December – Goronwy Rees, writer, 70?
- 20 December – Leslie Gilbert Illingworth, political cartoonist, 77
- 21 December – Nansi Richards, harpist, 91
- 29 December – Richard Tecwyn Williams, biochemist, 70
- date unknown
  - Hugh Bevan, academic
  - Dilys Davies, actress
  - Trebor Lloyd Evans, writer
  - Jennie Thomas, children's author
- probable – William Evans, rugby player, about 88

== See also ==
- 1979 in Northern Ireland
