= 1982 in Wales =

- Centuries: 18th; 19th; 20th; 21st
- Decades: 1960s; 1970s; 1980s; 1990s; 2000s
- See also: List of years in Wales; Timeline of Welsh history 1982 in The United Kingdom England Scotland Elsewhere

This article is about the particular significance of the year 1982 to Wales and its people.

== Incumbents ==
- Secretary of State for Wales – Nicholas Edwards
- Archbishop of Wales – Gwilym Williams, Bishop of Bangor (retired)
- Archdruid of the National Eisteddfod of Wales – Jâms Nicholas

== Events ==
- 2 January – The Welsh Army of Workers claims responsibility for a bomb explosion at the Birmingham headquarters of Severn Trent Water.
- 23 February – Wales was declared a Nuclear Free Zone as Clwyd County Council became the last of eight Welsh local authorities to pass a resolution to that effect.
- May – Swansea City complete their first season in the English Football League First Division with a sixth-place finish.
- 2 June – 100,000 people gather in Pontcanna Fields, Cardiff, to welcome Pope John Paul II on the first-ever papal visit to Wales.
- 8 June – 32 men from the Welsh Guards are killed when the Sir Galahad burns during the Falklands War. The most famous of the survivors is Simon Weston, who is severely burned.
- 16 June – Welsh miners go on strike to support health workers demanding a 12% pay rise.
- 30 August – St David's Hall opens in Cardiff.
- 11 September – 14 skydivers from Wales die when a Chinook helicopter crashes at an airshow in Mannheim in Germany.
- 16 September – At the Gower by-election brought about by the death of Ifor Davies, Gareth Wardell holds the seat for Labour.
- 17 October – First issue of Sulyn, the first Sunday newspaper in the Welsh language.
- 26 November – A plaque is unveiled by the Prince of Wales at the monument erected in memory of those who died in the Gresford Disaster of 1934.
- date unknown
  - The Inmos microprocessor factory in Newport, Wales, designed by the Richard Rogers Partnership, is completed.
  - Swansea is given the right to have a Lord Mayor. Councillor Paul Valerio becomes the first incumbent.
  - First students begin courses at the Welsh language study centre at Nant Gwrtheyrn.

== Arts and literature ==
- Roger Rees wins a Tony Award for Best Actor in a Play for his performance in The Life and Adventures of Nicholas Nickleby.
- Alice Thomas Ellis is shortlisted for the Booker Prize for The 27th Kingdom.

=== Awards ===
- National Eisteddfod of Wales (held in Swansea)
- National Eisteddfod of Wales: Chair - Gerallt Lloyd Owen
- National Eisteddfod of Wales: Crown - Eirwyn George
- National Eisteddfod of Wales: Prose Medal - Gwilym M. Jones

=== New books ===
- Gwynfor Evans - Bywyd Cymro
- Alun Jones - Pan Ddaw'r Machlud
- R. Merfyn Jones - The North Wales Quarrymen 1874-1922
- Rhiannon Davies Jones - Eryr Pengwern
- Kenneth O. Morgan - Rebirth of a Nation: Wales 1880-1980
- Wynford Vaughan-Thomas - Princes of Wales

=== Music ===
- John Cale - Music For A New Society (album)
- Dafydd Iwan with Ar Log - Rhwng Hwyl a Thaith

== Film ==
- Political Annie’s Off Again, film of a local industrial dispute made by Chapter Video Workshop.

== Broadcasting ==
=== Welsh-language television ===
- Cefn Gwlad
- Joni Jones
- Noson Lawen appears for the first time.
- S4C starts broadcasting on 1 November

=== English-language television ===
- The Citadel (BBC), filmed in Tredegar.

== Sport ==
- BBC Wales Sports Personality of the Year – Steve Barry
- Boxing
  - 14 September – Kelvin Smart becomes British flyweight champion after beating fellow Welsh fighter Dave George.
- Darts – Ann-Marie Davies wins the Women's World Masters Championship.
- Snooker
  - 13 January – Terry Griffiths wins the Lada Classic.
  - 4 December – Terry Griffiths wins the UK Snooker Championship, to complete his career Triple Crown (snooker).
  - Terry Parsons wins the World Amateur Championship.

== Births ==
- 9 January – Catherine Middleton, future Princess of Wales (in England)
- 14 January – Joe Dunthorne, novelist and poet
- 1 February – Gavin Henson, rugby player
- 4 February – Kevin Gall, footballer
- 2 May – Timothy Benjamin, athlete
- 12 May – David Thaxton, actor and singer
- 20 May – Owain Rhys Davies, actor (died 2026)
- 21 June – Prince William, first child of the Prince and Princess of Wales (in London)
- 29 August – Mike Phillips, rugby player
- 2 September – Matthew Rees, footballer
- 29 November – Imogen Thomas, model
- 25 December – Rob Edwards, footballer

== Deaths ==
- 5 January – Jeanetta Thomas, UK's oldest person and oldest Welsh-born woman of all time, 112
- 11 January – Ronald Lewis, actor, 53
- 5 February – Ronald Welch, historical novelist, 72
- 8 February – Cedric Morris, artist, 92
- 6 May – Jennie Eirian Davies, politician and magazine editor
- 19 May – Elwyn Jones, television writer, 58
- 31 May – Eryl Davies, educationist, 59
- 6 June – Ifor Davies, politician, 71
- 10 July
  - Gwilym Jenkins (in Lancaster), statistician and systems engineer, 49
  - Gwilym Ellis Lane Owen, philosopher, 60
- 17 July – Bob John, footballer, 83
- 16 August – Sydney Hinam, Wales international rugby player, 83
- 18 October – Idwal Jones, politician, 82
- 19 October – Iorwerth Peate, social anthropologist and poet, founder of St Fagans National Museum of History, 81
- 4 November – Talfryn Thomas, character actor, 60
- 16 November – Ivor Jones, rugby union international, 80
- 19 November – Herbie Evans, footballer, 88
- 4 December – Ivor Williams, portrait painter, 74

== See also ==
- 1982 in Northern Ireland
