= 1981 in Wales =

- Centuries: 18th; 19th; 20th; 21st
- Decades: 1960s; 1970s; 1980s; 1990s; 2000s
- See also: List of years in Wales; Timeline of Welsh history 1981 in The United Kingdom England Scotland Elsewhere

This article is about the particular significance of the year 1981 to Wales and its people.

== Incumbents ==
- Secretary of State for Wales – Nicholas Edwards
- Archbishop of Wales – Gwilym Williams, Bishop of Bangor
- Archdruid of the National Eisteddfod of Wales
  - Geraint (outgoing)
  - Jâms Nicholas (incoming)

== Events ==
- January - First phase of St. David's Shopping Centre, Cardiff, opens to the public.
- 26 March - Roy Jenkins co-founds the Social Democratic Party (UK) in London. Welsh Labour MPs defecting to the new party are: Tom Ellis (Wrexham), Ednyfed Hudson Davies (Caerphilly) and Jeffrey Thomas (Abertillery).
- 24 February - Buckingham Palace announces the engagement of the Prince of Wales to Lady Diana Spencer.
- 5 April - UK census: Results reveal that the percentage of Welsh language speakers has fallen to an all-time low of 18.9% of the Welsh population and Gwynedd is the only Welsh county with a Welsh-speaking majority.
- 11 June - Britain's first Urban Enterprise Zone is created in Lower Swansea Valley.
- 29 July - Wedding of the Prince of Wales and Lady Diana Spencer at St Paul's Cathedral in London.
- November - Joan Ruddock becomes Chair of CND.
- Independent film company Teliesyn begins producing programmes for S4C, BBC Wales and HTV.

== Arts and literature ==
- 6 June - The Alarm play their first gig under their new name, at the Victoria Hotel, Prestatyn.
- Theatre Wales is established.
- Harry Secombe receives a knighthood.

=== Awards ===
- National Eisteddfod of Wales (held in Machynlleth)
- National Eisteddfod of Wales: Chair - John Gwilym Jones, "Y Frwydr"
- National Eisteddfod of Wales: Crown - Siôn Aled, "Wynebau"
- National Eisteddfod of Wales: Prose Medal - John Griffith Jones, "Cysgodion ar y Pared"

=== New books ===
==== English language ====
- Clive Jenkins & Barrie Sherman - The Leisure Shock
- Eiluned Lewis - The Old Home
- Kenneth O. Morgan - Rebirth of a Nation: Wales 1880-1980
- R. S. Thomas - Between Here and Now

==== Welsh language ====
- Irma Chilton - Y Cwlwm Gwaed
- Eigra Lewis Roberts - Merch yr oriau mawr

=== Drama ===
- J. R. Evans - Brawd am Byth

=== Music ===
- Dafydd Iwan - "Yma o Hyd"
- Daniel Jones - Symphony no. 10
- William Mathias - Let the people praise Thee, O God

== Film ==
=== English-language films ===
- The Mouse and the Woman, starring Huw Ceredig.
- Dragonslayer, with exterior scenes filmed in Wales.

== Broadcasting ==
=== English-language television ===
- 4 March–29 April – The Life and Times of David Lloyd George, written by Elaine Morgan and starring Philip Madoc (BBC Wales)
- 24 September–18 December – Taff Acre (Harlech Television)

=== Welsh-language television ===
- Croeso i S4C, presented by Owen Edwards

== Sport ==
- BBC Wales Sports Personality of the Year – John Toshack
- Boxing - Neville Meade becomes British heavyweight champion.
- Football - Neville Southall joins Everton F.C.

== Births ==
- 12 January – Sarah Thomas, field hockey player
- 13 March – Ryan Jones, rugby player
- 17 March - Leigh De-Vulgt, footballer
- 28 March – Gareth David-Lloyd, actor
- 6 April – Robert Earnshaw, footballer
- 23 May – Gwenno Saunders, singer
- 24 May – Darren Moss, footballer
- 25 May – Huw Stephens, radio and TV presenter
- 18 November – Sian Reese-Williams, actress
- 19 November – Mark Wallace, cricketer
- 16 December – Gareth Williams Scottish-Welsh footballer

== Deaths ==
- January - Leslie Jones, footballer, 69
- March - Dai Francis, miners' leader
- 1 March - Dr Martyn Lloyd-Jones, theologian, 81
- 8 March - Nigel Birch, Baron Rhyl, politician, 74
- 3 April - Will Owen, miner and politician, 80
- 13 April - Gwyn Thomas, author, 67
- 15 May - J. E. Meredith, Presbyterian minister and writer, 76
- 16 June - Billy Hughes, footballer, 63
- 17 June - Ike Fowler, dual-code international rugby union player, 86
- 23 July - Goronwy Roberts, Baron Goronwy-Roberts, politician, 67
- 6 August - George Lewis, footballer, 67
- 18 September - Brinley Richards, poet, author and archdruid
- 30 September - Roy John, Wales and British Lions international rugby union player, 55
- 25 December - Tom Griffiths, Welsh international footballer, 75

== See also ==
- 1981 in Northern Ireland
