= 1982 in Scottish television =

This is a list of events in Scottish television from 1982.

== Events ==
- 14 March – 30th anniversary of BBC 1 Scotland.
- 26 April – "The Satellite Channel" is launched. In 1984 it is renamed Sky Channel after it is purchased by Rupert Murdoch and in 1989 it becomes known as Sky One. Today it is named Sky1.
- 31 August – 25th anniversary of Scottish Television.
- 2 November – Channel 4 starts broadcasting in the UK at 4:45pm. Channel 4 operates as a single national service. Adverts are shown on a regional basis, thereby allowing local commercials to be broadcast in Scotland.

== Television series ==
- Scotsport (1957–2008)
- Reporting Scotland (1968–1983; 1984–present)
- Top Club (1971–1998)
- Scotland Today (1972–2009)
- Sportscene (1975–present)
- The Beechgrove Garden (1978–present)
- Grampian Today (1980–2009)
- Take the High Road (1980–2003)
- Now You See It (1981–1986)

== Births ==
- 10 February – Darren McMullen, television presenter
- May – Shantha Roberts, television presenter

== See also ==
- 1982 in Scotland
