= 1982 in England =

- Centuries: 18th; 19th; 20th; 21st
- Decades: 1960s; 1970s; 1980s; 1990s; 2000s
- See also: 1981–82 in English football 1982–83 in English football 1982 in the United Kingdom; Other events of 1982

Events from 1982 in England

== Incumbent ==
Further information: Politics of England

- Monarch - Elizabeth II
- Prime Minister - Margaret Thatcher

== Events ==
- March 3 – Elizabeth II opens the Barbican Centre in London.
- July 20 – Hyde Park and Regent's Park bombings
- December 12 – Greenham Common Women's Peace Camp: 30,000 women hold hands and form a human chain around the 14.5 km (9 mi) perimeter fence of RAF Greenham Common in England in a protest against nuclear weapons.

== Births ==
- 6 January – Eddie Redmayne, actor
- 9 January – Catherine, Princess of Wales
- 5 February – Sean Heather, cricketer
- 11 February – Natalie Dormer, actress
- 21 June – William, Prince of Wales
- 28 October – Matt Smith, actor

== Deaths ==
- 6 February – Ben Nicholson, painter (born 1894)
- 6 July – Alma Reville, film editor and screenwriter (born 1899)
- 12 July – Kenneth More, actor (born 1909)
- 12 November – Dorothy Round Little, tennis champion (born 1908)

== See also ==
- 1982 in Northern Ireland
- 1982 in Scotland
- 1982 in Wales
