= Eveline Annie Jenkins =

British artist (1893–1976)

- Born: 1893; Monmouthshire, Wales
- Died: 1976 (aged 82–83)
- Education: University College of Wales, Aberystwyth; Aberystwyth Art School
- Known for: Botanical artist, illustrator

Eveline Annie Jenkins (July 1893 – 1976) was a Welsh botanical artist and illustrator.

== Early life and education ==
Eveline Annie Jenkins was born in Monmouthshire, one of three children of the civil servant William Herbert Jenkins and Eveline Jenkins.

She was educated at Newport Girls High School and studied for a B.Sc. at the University College of Wales, Aberystwyth, while studying art in her own time. Jenkins took lessons at the Aberystwyth Art School during 1912 and 1913 and, in 1916, spent six weeks at the Stanhope Forbes school in Newlyn.

In 1913, she won first prize at the National Eisteddfod for her design for a public fountain.

== Career ==
After she graduated, Jenkins worked as a teacher for six years, first in Cornwall and then in Wales.

In 1927, Jenkins took the post of botanical artist with the National Museum of Wales, and she held that position until 1959. During that time, her illustrations featured in numerous books published by the museum, as well as publications and journals. These included the 1961 book Welsh Timber Trees by H. A. Hyde and A. E. Wade, and several works on fungi. Her work continues to feature in the museum's publications, for example the 2001 Catalogue of Botanical Plants and Drawings of the National Museum of Wales.

== Exhibitions and collections ==
Jenkins was a member of the South Wales Art Society, and her work featured in the 1955 touring exhibition of contemporary Welsh painting and sculpture organised by the Arts Council of Wales.

Examples of her work are held by the Contemporary Art Society for Wales and at National Museum Cardiff.
