= 1983 in Scotland =

- Centuries: 18th; 19th; 20th; 21st
- Decades: 1960s; 1970s; 1980s; 1990s; 2000s
- See also: List of years in Scotland; Timeline of Scottish history 1983 in: The UK • England • Wales • Elsewhere; Scottish football: 1982–83 • 1983–84; 1983 in Scottish television

Events from the year 1983 in Scotland.

== Incumbents ==
- Secretary of State for Scotland and Keeper of the Great Seal – George Younger

=== Law officers ===
- Lord Advocate – Lord Mackay of Clashfern
- Solicitor General for Scotland – Peter Fraser

=== Judiciary ===
- Lord President of the Court of Session and Lord Justice General – Lord Emslie
- Lord Justice Clerk – Lord Wheatley
- Chairman of the Scottish Land Court – Lord Elliott

== Events ==
- 11 May – Aberdeen F.C. beat Real Madrid 2–1 (after extra time) to win the European Cup Winner's Cup.
- 21 May – Aberdeen beat Rangers 1–0 to win the Scottish Cup.
- 30 September – Megget Reservoir officially opened.
- 5 October – Harviestoun Brewery established.
- 24 October – Dennis Nilsen goes on trial at the Central Criminal Court in London accused of six murders and two attempted murders. He confesses to murdering "15 or 16" young men.
- 4 November – Dennis Nilsen is sentenced to life imprisonment.
- 20 December – Aberdeen beat European Cup Winners Hamburg 2–0 to become the first Scottish club to win the UEFA Super Cup.
- Brae oilfield production begins.
- Glasgow Central Mosque built.

== Births ==
- 1 January – Mark Beaumont, adventurer
- 27 January – Douglas Ross, Conservative politician
- 8 February – Ashley Mulheron, actress and television presenter
- 14 March – Anas Sarwar, Labour politician
- 15 March – Sean Biggerstaff, actor
- 30 April - Will Jordan, author, film critic and YouTuber
- 8 June – Allan Dick, field hockey goalkeeper
- 22 August – Julie Kilpatrick, field hockey player
- 20 September – Freya Ross, née Murray, long-distance runner
- 30 September – Louise Munn, field hockey defender

== Deaths ==
- 27 April – Christina Larner, historian (born 1933 in England)
- 5 July – Alec Cheyne, international footballer (born 1907)
- August – Winifred Rushforth, psychoanalyst (born 1885)
- 26 August – Major-General Douglas Wimberley, soldier (born 1896)
- 20 September – Andy Beattie, international footballer and manager (born 1913)

== The arts ==
- 17 February – release of Bill Forsyth's film Local Hero.
- 6 September – ITV broadcasts the Scottish Television-produced police procedural Killer, set in Glasgow, pilot for the series Taggart.
- 21 October – Burrell Collection opened in Glasgow.
- Alternative rock band Del Amitri is formed in Glasgow.
- Alternative rock band The Jesus and Mary Chain is formed in East Kilbride.
- Folk rock band The Proclaimers is formed by twins Craig and Charlie Reid of Auchtermuchty.
- Gael Turnbull publishes his poems From the Language of the Heart: Some Imitations from the Gaelic of Sine Reisideach in Glasgow.

== See also ==
- 1983 in Northern Ireland
