= 1986 in Scotland =

- Centuries: 18th; 19th; 20th; 21st
- Decades: 1960s; 1970s; 1980s; 1990s; 2000s
- See also: List of years in Scotland; Timeline of Scottish history 1986 in: The UK • England • Wales • Elsewhere; Scottish football: 1985–86 • 1986–87; 1986 in Scottish television

Events from the year 1986 in Scotland.

== Incumbents ==
- Secretary of State for Scotland and Keeper of the Great Seal – George Younger until 11 January; then Malcolm Rifkind

=== Law officers ===
- Lord Advocate – Lord Cameron of Lochbroom
- Solicitor General for Scotland – Peter Fraser

=== Judiciary ===
- Lord President of the Court of Session and Lord Justice General – Lord Emslie
- Lord Justice Clerk – Lord Ross
- Chairman of the Scottish Land Court – Lord Elliott

== Events ==
- 24 March – Edinburgh–Bathgate line reopened to rail passengers.
- 26 March – Kenny Dalglish becomes the first Scotland national football team player to be capped 100 times at senior level.
- April – Scottish Unionist Party established.
- 8 May – 1986 Scottish regional elections, result in the Conservatives losing control of the two Regional Councils where they previously held a majority: Grampian and Tayside.
- 24 July–2 August – Commonwealth Games held in Edinburgh.
- c. August – the millionth council house to be sold under the right to buy scheme is sold to its tenants in Scotland, seven years after the scheme was launched in the United Kingdom.
- 9 September – MS Norsea launched at Govan, the largest passenger ship built on the Clyde (31785 GT) and last large passenger ship built in the U.K.
- 26 October – bus deregulation in Great Britain: First Magic Bus (Stagecoach) operation, in Glasgow.
- 6 November – 1986 British International Helicopters Chinook crash: 45 oil workers killed when a Chinook helicopter carrying them from the Brent oilfield crashes in Shetland.
- December – the St Kilda islands become the first World Heritage Site in Scotland.
- James Nelson, a confessed and convicted matricide, is ordained a minister of the Church of Scotland.
- Highland Wildlife Park taken over by Royal Zoological Society of Scotland.

== Births ==
- 3 January – Allan Walker, footballer
- 13 February – Jamie Murray, tennis player
- 16 April – Paul di Resta, racing driver
- 27 April – Hayley Mulheron, netball player
- 12 May – Luke Douglas, Australian-Scottish rugby league player
- 26 May – Fern Brady, stand-up comedian
- 5 June – Charlotte Dobson, racing sailor
- 18 June – Richard Madden, actor
- 17 September – Sophie (Xeon), born Samuel Long, singer-songwriter and record producer (died 2021 in Greece)
- 13 November – Kevin Bridges, stand-up comedian
- 11 December – Kris Doolan, footballer

== Deaths ==
- 21 September – Bill Simpson, actor (born 1931)

== The arts ==
- 28 March – BBC Scotland screens Bill Bryden's The Holy City, a retelling of the Easter story set in Glasgow.
- Robert Alan Jamieson's novel Thin Wealth and Shetland dialect poetry collection Shoormal are published.
- Gilded Balloon comedy venue in Edinburgh first opens.

== See also ==
- 1986 in England
- 1986 in Northern Ireland
- 1986 in Wales
