= 1983 in England =

- Centuries: 18th; 19th; 20th; 21st
- Decades: 1960s; 1970s; 1980s; 1990s; 2000s
- See also: 1982–83 in English football 1983–84 in English football 1983 in the United Kingdom; Other events of 1983

Events from 1983 in England.

== Incumbent ==
- Monarch – Elizabeth II
- Prime Minister – Margaret Thatcher

== Births ==
- 3 February – Spencer Davey, cricketer
- 23 February – Emily Blunt, actress
- 5 May – Henry Cavill, actor
- 23 August – Fiona Onasanya, Labour politician and convicted criminal
- 14 September – Amy Winehouse, singer and songwriter

== See also ==
- 1983 in Northern Ireland
- 1983 in Scotland
- 1983 in Wales
