= 1984 in England =

- Centuries: 18th; 19th; 20th; 21st
- Decades: 1960s; 1970s; 1980s; 1990s; 2000s
- See also: 1983–84 in English football 1984–85 in English football 1984 in the United Kingdom; Other events of 1984

Events from the year 1984 in England.

== Incumbent ==
- Monarch – Elizabeth II
- Prime Minister – Margaret Thatcher

== Events ==
=== March ===
- 23 March – Hilda Murrell, 78-year-old rose grower and anti-nuclear campaigner, is found dead near her home in Shropshire, five days after being reported missing. West Mercia Police launch a murder investigation.
- 27 March – Starlight Express opens at Apollo Victoria Theatre in London.

=== April ===
- 2 April – Youth gangs run riot in Wolverhampton, looting from shops.
- 4 April – Peace protesters evicted from the Greenham Common Women's Peace Camp.
- 17 April – WPC Yvonne Fletcher is shot and killed by a secluded gunman during a siege outside the Libyan Embassy in London in the event known as the 1984 Libyan Embassy Siege. 11 other people are also shot but survive.

=== May ===
- 2 May – The Liverpool International Garden Festival opens in Liverpool.
- 8 May – The Thames Barrier, designed to protect London from floods, is opened by The Queen.
- 12 May – Liverpool F.C. secure a third consecutive league title and the 15th in the club's history, despite being held to a 0–0 draw away at Notts County.
- 19 May – Everton win the FA Cup, their first major trophy for 14 years, with a 2–0 win over Watford in the final at Wembley Stadium. The goals are scored by Andy Gray and Graham Sharp. Everton's last FA Cup triumph came in 1966, and they have now won the trophy four times.
- 29 May – Fighting at Orgreave colliery between police and striking miners leaves 64 injured.
- 30 May
  - The Queen officially opens a new terminal at Birmingham Airport. The terminal has been in use since the start of last month, replacing the original terminal that opened in 1939.
  - Liverpool win the European Cup for the fourth time with a penalty shoot-out victory over AS Roma of Italy after a 1–1 draw in the final at Stadio Olimpico in Rome. Liverpool, who have also won the Football League First Division and Football League Cup this season, are the first English club to win three major trophies in the same season.

=== June ===
- 1 June – Seven-year-old British boy Mark Tildesley disappears from his home in Wokingham, Berkshire, after visiting a local fairground. He is abducted and murdered by a paedophile ring led by Sidney Cooke; his body is never found.
- 7 June – 120 people are arrested when fighting breaks out outside the Houses of Parliament during a mass lobby by striking miners.
- 15 June – A miner picketing a Yorkshire power station is killed by a lorry.
- 18 June – Battle of Orgreave confrontation between picketing miners and police.
- 19 June – Austin Rover launches the Rover 200 saloon, the replacement for the Triumph Acclaim, which means the end of the Triumph brand after 61 years. Like its predecessor, the new car is the result of a venture with Honda.
- 22 June – The inaugural flight of the first Virgin Atlantic plane takes place.
- 29 June – Control of London Transport is removed from the Greater London Council and transferred to London Regional Transport (reporting to the Secretary of State for Transport) under terms of the London Regional Transport Act 1984.

=== July ===
- 6 July
  - David Jenkins consecrated as Bishop of Durham, despite strong objections from conservative Christians.
  - Murder of Isabel Schwarz, a psychiatric social worker, in South London.
- 9 July – A fire in the roof of York Minster, probably caused by an electrical storm, causes extensive damage which is expected to cost millions of pounds to repair.

=== August ===
- 2 August – A Surrey businessman wins a case in the European Court of Human Rights over illegal phone tapping by the police.

=== September ===
- 7 September – An outbreak of food poisoning in two Yorkshire hospitals has so far claimed 22 lives in the space of two weeks.
- 15–16 September – Bones believed to be those of St Edward the Martyr (King of England, 975–978) are enshrined in the Church of St. Edward the Martyr, Brookwood, Surrey.
- 24 September – Four pupils and their teacher die and a further six pupils are injured when a roll of steel from a lorry crushes their minibus near Stuart Bathurst RC High School in Wednesbury, West Midlands.

=== October ===
- 1 October – David Jenkins, Bishop of Durham, criticises Margaret Thatcher's social policies, noting that Durham has been hard hit by factory and mine closures since she became Prime Minister in 1979.
- 3 October – Plans to expand the Urban Enterprise Zone in Dudley, West Midlands, are approved, allowing developers Don and Roy Richardson to build the Merry Hill retail park and shopping mall on the main part of the site.
- 5 October – Police in Essex make the largest cannabis seizure in British criminal history when a multimillion-pound stash of the drug is found on a schooner moored on the River Crouch near North Fambridge village.
- 12 October – The Provisional Irish Republican Army attempts to assassinate the Conservative cabinet in the Brighton hotel bombing. Margaret Thatcher escapes unharmed, but MP Anthony Berry and four other people are killed, whilst Norman Tebbit is trapped among the rubble and his wife Margaret is seriously injured.

=== November ===
- 5 November – 800 miners end their strike and return to work.
- 15 November – The General Synod of the Church of England supports the ordination of women as deacons, but not as full priests.
- 23 November – The Oxford Circus fire traps around 1,000 passengers on the London Underground but no-one is killed.

=== December ===
- 12 December – Bucks Fizz, the highly successful pop group, are involved in a road accident near Newcastle upon Tyne when their tour bus crashes in icy road conditions after a concert. Bobby Gee, Cheryl Baker and Jay Aston escape with relatively minor injuries, but Mike Nolan is in a serious condition.
- 31 December – Rick Allen, drummer of Def Leppard, loses his left arm in a car accident on the A57 road at Snake Pass.

=== Undated ===
- Chatham Dockyard in Medway is closed after being used as a shipbuilding yard for over 400 years since the reign of Henry VIII.
- Non-diocesan Bishop at Lambeth first appointed within the Church of England.
