= 1981 in England =

- Centuries: 18th; 19th; 20th; 21st
- Decades: 1960s; 1970s; 1980s; 1990s; 2000s
- See also: 1980–81 in English football 1981–82 in English football 1981 in the United Kingdom; Other events of 1981

Events from 1981 in England

== Incumbent ==
Further information: Politics of England

- Monarch - Elizabeth II
- Prime Minister - Margaret Thatcher

== Events ==
- March 29 – The first London Marathon starts, with 7,500 runners.
- April 11 – 1981 Brixton riot: Rioters in south London, UK, throw petrol bombs, attack police and loot shops.
- May 22 – Serial killer Peter Sutcliffe is found guilty and sentenced to life imprisonment on 13 counts of murder and 7 of attempted murder in England.
- November 12 – The Church of England General Synod votes to admit women to holy orders.

== Births ==
- 9 February – Tom Hiddleston, actor
- 18 February – Andrew McKay, actor

== Deaths ==
- 16 January – Bernard Lee, actor (born 1908)
- 12 February – Bruce Fraser, 1st Baron Fraser of North Cape, British admiral (born 1888)
- 23 March – Mike Hailwood, motorcycle racer and racing driver (born 1950)
- 29 September – Bill Shankly, football manager (born 1913)

== See also ==
- 1981 in Northern Ireland
- 1981 in Scotland
- 1981 in Wales
