= 1979 in England =

- Centuries: 18th; 19th; 20th; 21st
- Decades: 1950s; 1960s; 1970s; 1980s; 1990s
- See also: 1978–79 in English football 1979–80 in English football 1979 in the United Kingdom; Other events of 1979

Events from 1979 in England

== Incumbent ==
- Monarch - Elizabeth II
- Prime Minister - James Callaghan (until 4 May), Margaret Thatcher (from 4 May)

== Events ==
- April 23 – Fighting breaks out in London between the Anti-Nazi League and the Metropolitan Police's Special Patrol Group; protester Blair Peach receives fatal injuries during the incident, now officially attributed to the SPG.
- May 8 – Ten shoppers die in a fire at the Woolworths department store in Manchester city centre in England.
- December 4 – The Hastie fire in Kingston upon Hull, leads to the deaths of 3 boys and begins the hunt for Bruce George Peter Lee, the UK's most prolific killer.

== Births ==
- 18 January – Katie Hooper, synchronised swimmer
- 20 March – Freema Agyeman, actress
- 10 April – Sophie Ellis-Bextor, singer
- 2 December – Gayle Adamson, synchronised swimmer

== Deaths ==
- 2 February – Sid Vicious, musician
- 24 March – Yvonne Mitchell, actress
- 13 October – Rebecca Clarke, composer and violist
- 30 October – Barnes Wallis, engineer and inventor (born 1887)
- 23 November – Merle Oberon, actress (born 1911)

== See also ==
- 1979 in Northern Ireland
- 1979 in Scotland
- 1979 in Wales
