= Sean Heather =

English cricketer (born 1982)

Sean Andrew Heather (born 5 February 1982) is an English cricketer. He is a right-handed batsman and a right-arm medium-pace bowler.

The former Eastbourne cricketer was born in Chichester and holds the record throughout 2005 for the most runs in a Premier Division season with 1082 runs.
