= Noel Morgan (cricketer) =

Welsh cricketer

Noel Morgan (born Edward Noel Morgan; 22 December 1905 — 27 August 1975) was a Welsh cricketer. He was a right-handed batsman who played for Glamorgan. He was born in Garnant and died in Cardiff.

Morgan made a single first-class appearance for the side, during the 1934 season, against Essex. He scored a single run in the only innings in which he batted.

Morgan's brother, Guy, and uncle Teddy, also played cricket for Glamorgan.
