= Alun Davies (historian) =

Welsh historian

Alun Davies (1916 – 20 March 1980) was a Welsh historian. His parents were Welsh Independent minister Rev. Ben Davies (1878–1958), and his wife, Sarah, who lived in the Llandysul area of Cardiganshire. After completing his secondary education in Llandysul he took up a place at University College of Wales, Aberystwyth graduating in history in 1937. He then went on to study for an MA at the Sorbonne under Georges Lefebvre. He was still studying at the Cité Universitaire in 1940 when Paris was invaded by the German army. He immediately returned to the UK and joined the army as a military interpreter. A posting in Burma saw him promoted in the 14th Army in Burma to Intelligence Officer, firstly a captain then a major, and him participating in the reconquest of Burma. Leaving the army in 1946 he returned to Aberystwyth to take up a position as lecturer of history. He remained there until 1955, when he took up a position at the London School of Economics as a Reader in International History (his chief role, together with director of the Institute for Historical Research at London University, Sir Goronwy Edwards (1891–1976), being to supervise research students. He also held the position of secretary to the Royal Historical Society.

He was to move back to Wales however, on appointment to the chair of Modern History at the University College of Swansea in 1961, working there with Glanmor Williams (1920–2005). Unfortunately whilst there his health declined, forcing him to enter retirement in 1979. He received treatment for cancer of the throat and oesophagus at the Royal Marsden Hospital in London, but died there in March 1980. His ashes are interred in Bwlchnewydd cemetery, Carmarthenshire with the rest of his family.
