= Ifan Evans =

Welsh rugby union footballer

- Born: Ifan Evans; 22 July 1983 (age 43) Aberystwyth, Wales
- Height: 1.78 m (5 ft 10 in)
- Weight: 90 kg (14 st 2 lb)
- School: Ysgol Gyfun Gymunedol Penweddig

Rugby union career
- Position: Wing
Senior career
Years	Team	Apps	(Points)
- Aberystwyth
- Llanelli RFC
- Llandovery
2003–2011	Newport RFC	91	(170)
- Correct as of 11 January 2012
Provincial / State sides
Years	Team	Apps	(Points)
2006–2011	Scarlets	0	(0)
- Correct as of 29 June 2010
National sevens team
Years	Team		Comps
2006–present	Wales		

Ifan Evans is a Welsh rugby union player, for Newport RFC and the Wales 7's team. He previously played for Llandovery RFC .

He was selected in the Wales Sevens squad for 2012-13
