= Tom Morgan (cricketer) =

Welsh cricketer

Personal information
- Full name: Thomas Rhys Morgan
- Born: 11 April 1893; Porth, Glamorgan, Wales
- Died: 6 April 1975 (aged 81); Aberkenfig, Mid Glamorgan, Wales
- Batting: Right-handed
- Bowling: Right-arm off break
- Role: Batsman

Domestic team information
- Years: Team
- 1921–1925: Glamorgan

Career statistics
Competition	FC
Matches	39
Runs scored	1,044
Batting average	15.35
100s/50s	0/4
Top score	87*
Balls bowled	17
Wickets	0
Bowling average	–
5 wickets in innings	–
10 wickets in match	–
Best bowling	–
Catches/stumpings	5/0
- Source: ESPNcricinfo, 27 July 2021

Thomas Rhys Morgan (born Tom Rees Morgan; 11 April 1893 – 6 April 1975) was a Welsh cricketer. A right-handed batsman, he played 39 first-class matches for Glamorgan between 1921 and 1925. For Glamorgan, he made 1,044 runs with a highest score of 87*.

Morgan was born Tom Rees Morgan in Porth on 11 April 1893. He was registered as Thomas Rhys Morgan at death, which occurred on 6 April 1975 in Aberkenfig.
