= 1986 in England =

- Centuries: 18th; 19th; 20th; 21st
- Decades: 1960s; 1970s; 1980s; 1990s; 2000s
- See also: 1985–86 in English football 1986–87 in English football 1986 in the United Kingdom; Other events of 1986

Events from 1986 in England.

== Incumbent ==
- Monarch – Elizabeth II
- Prime Minister – Margaret Thatcher

== Events ==
- 22 June – The England national football team's hopes of winning the World Cup are ended with a 2–1 defeat in the quarter-finals by Argentina, a match in which Diego Maradona scores a controversial handball goal.

== Births ==
- 28 January – Jessica Ennis-Hill, heptathlete
- 13 May – Robert Pattinson, actor
- 27 June – Sam Claflin, actor
- 28 August – Florence Welch, singer-songwriter
- 30 August – Theo Hutchcraft, musical artist
- 23 October – Emilia Clarke, actress
- 1 December – Andrew Tate, kickboxer and media personality
- 30 December – Ellie Goulding, singer and songwriter

== See also ==
- 1986 in Northern Ireland
- 1986 in Scotland
- 1986 in Wales
