= 1985 in England =

- Centuries: 18th; 19th; 20th; 21st
- Decades: 1960s; 1970s; 1980s; 1990s; 2000s
- See also: 1984–85 in English football 1985–86 in English football 1985 in the United Kingdom; Other events of 1985

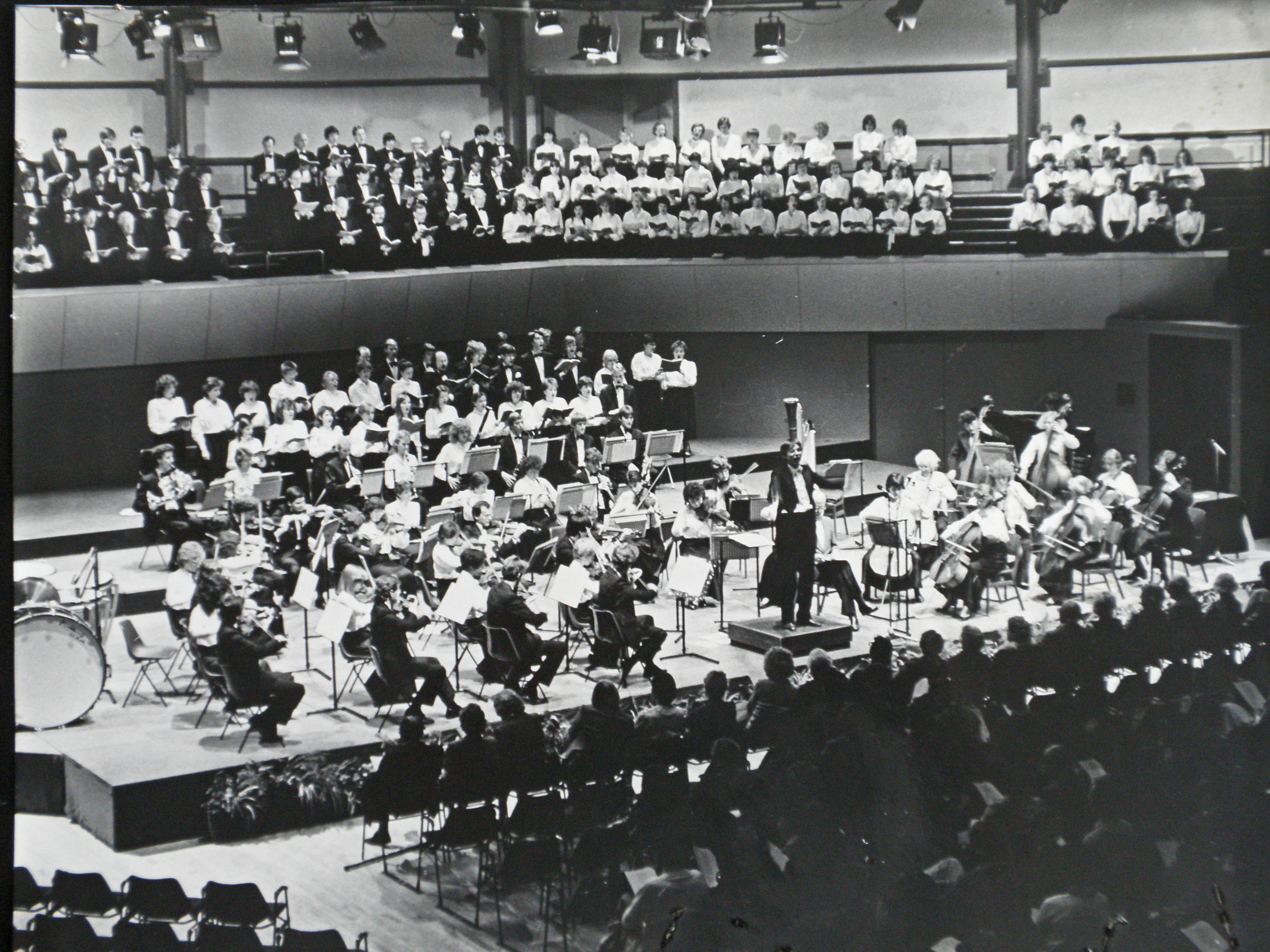
University of Warwick Orchestra and Chorus performing in 1985 at Warwick Arts Centre. Simon Halsey.

Events from 1985 in England.

== Incumbent ==
- Monarch – Elizabeth II
- Prime Minister – Margaret Thatcher

== Events ==
=== October ===
- 6 October – PC Keith Blakelock is fatally stabbed during the Broadwater Farm Riot in Tottenham, London. Two of his colleagues are treated in hospital for gunshot wounds, as are three journalists.

== Births ==
- 7 January – Lewis Hamilton, racing driver
- 20 February – Michael Oliver, FIFA football referee
- 26 March – Keira Knightley, actress
- 3 April – Leona Lewis, singer
- 14 July – Phoebe Waller-Bridge, actress

== See also ==
- 1985 in Northern Ireland
- 1985 in Scotland
- 1985 in Wales
