= Joseph Owen =

Welsh cricketer

Personal information
- Full name: Joseph Glyn Owen
- Born: 23 January 1909; Llanelli, Carmarthenshire, Wales
- Died: 17 February 1978 (aged 69); Eastbourne, Sussex, England
- Batting: Left-handed
- Bowling: Slow left-arm orthodox

Domestic team information
- Years: Team
- 1950–1951: Minor Counties
- 1939–1957: Bedfordshire
- 1930–1933: Surrey

Career statistics
Competition	First-class
Matches	18
Runs scored	361
Batting average	22.56
100s/50s	–/2
Top score	57
Balls bowled	1,784
Wickets	16
Bowling average	52.31
5 wickets in innings	–
10 wickets in match	–
Best bowling	3/15
Catches/stumpings	8/–
- Source: Cricinfo, 13 December 2014

Joseph Glyn Owen (23 January 1909 – 17 February 1978) was a Welsh first-class cricketer active from the early 1930s to the late 1950s. A left-handed batsman and slow left-arm orthodox bowler, Owen played in over a dozen first-class cricket matches, as well as playing minor counties cricket for Surrey and Bedfordshire.

Born at Llanelli, Carmarthenshire, Owen made his debut in first-class cricket for Surrey against Middlesex at Lord's in 1930. His first appearance in the County Championship came in the following season, with four appearances in the competition (plus one non-Championship match against Middlesex at The Oval). Owen continued to play infrequently for Surrey in the 1932 and 1933 seasons, making nine first-class appearances across the two seasons. He made a total of fifteen first-class appearances for Surrey, scoring 196 runs at an average of 19.60, recording a single half century with a high-score of 54, which came against Hampshire in 1932, and included large partnerships with Robert Gregory and Alf Gover, to help Surrey recover from 150/8 to 316 all out. With his slow left-arm orthodox bowling, he took 16 wickets, but was fairly ineffective, averaging 44.37 per wicket, with best figures of 3/15.

Six years after leaving Surrey, Owen joined Bedfordshire, making his debut for the county in the 1939 Minor Counties Championship against Hertfordshire. Eight further appearances followed, in what was to be the final season before county cricket was cancelled following the outbreak of World War II. After the conclusion of the war, Owen resumed playing minor counties cricket for Bedfordshire. He was selected to represent a combined Minor Counties cricket team in two first-class matches in 1950, against the Marylebone Cricket Club and the touring West Indians, recording his highest first-class score of 57 against the Marylebone Cricket Club. A final first-class appearance came in 1951, when the Minor Counties played Kent. He continued to play for Bedfordshire in the Minor Counties Championship until 1957, by which time he had made a total of 96 appearances.

He died at Eastbourne, Sussex on 17 February 1978.
