= 1980 in England =

- Centuries: 18th; 19th; 20th; 21st
- Decades: 1960s; 1970s; 1980s; 1990s; 2000s
- See also: 1979–80 in English football 1980–81 in English football 1980 in the United Kingdom; Other events of 1980

Events from 1980 in England

== Incumbent ==
Further information: Politics of England

- Monarch - Elizabeth II
- Prime Minister - Margaret Thatcher

== Events ==
- 5 October – Elisabeth blast furnace demolished at Bilston Steelworks marking the end of iron and steel production in the Black Country of England.

== Births ==
- 10 April – Charlie Hunnam, actor & screenwriter
- 12 May – Rishi Sunak, Prime Minister
- 30 May – Steven Gerrard, football manager and player
- 7 December – John Terry, football coach and player

== Deaths ==
- 29 April – Sir Alfred Hitchcock, film director (born 1899)

== See also ==
- 1980 in Northern Ireland
- 1980 in Scotland
- 1980 in Wales
