= Eryl Davies =

Welsh teacher

Eryl Oliver Davies (22 December 1922 – 31 May 1982) was a Welsh teacher and school inspector, and was Chief Inspector of Schools for Wales from 1972 until his death in 1982.

== Life ==
Davies was born on 22 December 1922 in Merthyr Tydfil, Wales and educated there before attending Jesus College, Oxford. He was an officer in the South Wales Borderers and the King's Shropshire Light Infantry during the Second World War, and was mentioned in dispatches when serving in Normandy. He ended the war as a major in the War Office Directorate of Infantry. After the war, he began teaching at Bradford Grammar School before becoming a school inspector in Wales, becoming Chief Inspector of Schools (Wales) in 1972. He was also a member of the School Broadcasting Council, the Schools Council and the Open University Advisory Committee for Wales. He died on 31 May 1982 at the age of 59.
