= Lucy Dickenson =

- Born: 3 June 1980; Barry, Vale of Glamorgan, Wales
- Died: 20 August 2012 (aged 32); Chirundu, Zambia
- Occupations: Humanitarian; Social entrepreneur; Singer-songwriter

Lucy Dickenson (3 June 1980 – 20 August 2012) was a Welsh humanitarian, social entrepreneur and singer-songwriter. She began her humanitarian career in Uganda in 1999 and founded The SAFE Foundation international development charity with her twin sister and volunteer trustees in 2006 and it started work the following year.

== Early life ==
Dickenson was born on 3 June 1980 in Barry, South Wales. She was a twin, and the daughter of Glenys and Mark Dickenson. Dickenson had two elder sisters. She was first educated at All Saints CIW Primary School and then at Bishop of Llandaff Church in Wales High School in Cardiff. Dickenson first became interested in charity work when she saw Comic Relief at the age of nine.

== Career ==
In January 1999, after completing her schooling, Dickenson travelled to the African country of Uganda as part of a missionary with the North Wales-based Right Hand Trust Christian charity to assist AIDS affected orphans. She was on a gap year, and worked at a secondary school and an orphanage in Kantare. Dickenson found her self caught up by violent unrest in which eight western tourists and four tour guides were murdered by Rwandan rebels on a trekking expedition at the Bwindi Impenetrable Forest in March 1999. She decided not to join the group as she had to start work at the orphanage early but was later forced out of her hotel by Rwandan Hutu rebels to witness the murder of a man.

When Dickenson returned to Britain in July 1999, the experience led her to seek therapy for post-traumatic stress disorder two years later and declined to enroll at the University of East London to study International Development after being offered a place there. She and her twin sister established the Juniper Orphan Fund to provide assistance to Ugandan orphans. Dickenson founded The SAFE Foundation international development charity in 2006 and became operational the following year with her twin sister and a group of volunteer trustees in support of small, rural projects that had difficulty finding mainstream aid. At first, Dickenson operated the charity at the home of her mother in Barry, raising money in Britain to provide funding to projects across the globe and working with indigenously run partner charities. The charity later moved to Cardiff, sending the young NEETs to raise their self-esteem by sending them to head workshops in Africa and Asia. She was the charity's sole full-time worker and worked long hours installing projects and getting funding from grants and fundraising. At the time of her death, the charity was running 16 projects in ten countries.

Dickenson spent six years studying part-time for a World Religion and International Development with humanities degree at the Open University. She held down a part-time job at Waterlily, a High Street gift shop. From the age of 14, Dickenson and her twin sister composed songs and performed as a duo known as Amber Hour, fusing dub music with folk and rock. She was also a trustee of Vale for Africa for four years.

== Death ==
In August 2012, she travelled to the South-central African country of Zambia to perform charity work with the Monze District Land Alliance group, helping people grow food and advocacy work for woman who were subject to abuses of their land rights. Dickenson was involved in a road accident in the Southern Province and died of multiple injuries at Mtendere Mission Hospital, Chirundu on 20 August 2012. Her funeral was held in Barry on 6 September 2012. An inquest into Dickenson's death held in Cardiff in August 2017 determined that her death was accidental.

== Recognition ==
She received the UN Goldstar Communities Award and was honored by the Welsh charity UnLtd as an "inspirational social entrepreneur". Dickenson was one of 17 women honored with a plaque on the Penarth Women Trail walking trail that was opened in Barry in 2014. A rare Welsh species fruit orchard was planted in tribute to her on a park at White Farm in Barry in 2014. A charity centre called the Lucy Memorial Centre was named for her and was opened in the Indian village of Mugaiyur in 2018.
