= 1982 in Scotland =

- Centuries: 18th; 19th; 20th; 21st
- Decades: 1960s; 1970s; 1980s; 1990s; 2000s
- See also: List of years in Scotland; Timeline of Scottish history 1982 in: The UK • England • Wales • Elsewhere; Scottish football: 1981–82 • 1982–83; 1982 in Scottish television

Events from the year 1982 in Scotland.

== Incumbents ==
- Secretary of State for Scotland and Keeper of the Great Seal – George Younger

=== Law officers ===
- Lord Advocate – Lord Mackay of Clashfern
- Solicitor General for Scotland – Nicholas Fairbairn; then Peter Fraser

=== Judiciary ===
- Lord President of the Court of Session and Lord Justice General – Lord Emslie
- Lord Justice Clerk – Lord Wheatley
- Chairman of the Scottish Land Court – Lord Elliott

== Events ==
- 10 January – The lowest ever Scottish and UK temperature of −27.2 °C is recorded at Braemar, in Aberdeenshire. This equals the record set in the same place in 1895, and the record will be equalled again at Altnaharra in 1995.
- February – first production from the Fulmar Oil Field in the North Sea.
- 25 March – Roy Jenkins wins the Glasgow Hillhead by-election for the Social Democratic Party.
- 6 May – 1982 Scottish regional elections, resulting in Labour winning the largest number of local councillors in the regions, followed by the Conservatives.
- 31 May–1 June – Pope John Paul II's visit to the United Kingdom embraces Edinburgh and Glasgow.
- 12 June – Faslane Peace Camp established.
- 24 June – Coatbridge and Airdrie by-election: Tom Clarke retains the seat for Labour.
- 19 July – Kessock Bridge opened over the Beauly Firth.
- 2 December – Glasgow Queen's Park by-election: Helen McElhone retains the seat for Labour previously held by her husband despite a swing of 9.4% to the Scottish National Party.
- 6–11 December – The 1982 European Curling Championships take place in Kirkcaldy.
- The Carron Company ironworks of 1759 at Falkirk goes into receivership.
- First discovery on the Isle of Skye of fossilized dinosaur footprints, at Lealt.

== Births ==
- 5 January – Darren Mackie, footballer
- 15 May – Douglas Simpson, field hockey forward
- 21 October – David Mansouri, field hockey defender
- 14 November – Stephen Hughes, footballer
- 6 December – Susie Wolff, racing driver
- 12 December – Louise Carroll, field hockey defender

== Deaths ==
- 4 February
  - Alex Harvey, glam rock musician (born 1935)
  - Anne Gillespie Shaw, engineer and businesswoman (born 1904)
- 20 February – Isobel Wylie Hutchison, explorer (born 1889)
- 1 May in Provo, Utah – William Primrose, Scottish-born violist (born 1904)
- 1 July – Alexander Reid, playwright (born 1914)
- 20 October – Jimmy McGrory, footballer (born 1904)

== The arts ==
- Soft rock band Wet Wet Wet forms in Clydebank as "Vortex Motion".

== See also ==
- 1982 in Northern Ireland
