= Newport Girls' High School =

Location
- Wellington Road; Newport, Shropshire, TF10 7HL; England
- Coordinates: 52.7632°N 2.3813°W

Information
- Type: Grammar school; Academy
- Established: c.1919
- Local authority: Telford and Wrekin Council
- Department for Education URN: 136516 Tables
- Ofsted: Reports
- Chair of Governors: Tony Brown
- Headteacher: Adam Jones
- Deputy Headteacher: Vacant Position
- Gender: Girls
- Age: 11 to 18
- Enrolment: 800
- Houses: Austen (red), Roddam (yellow), Seacole (green). Formerly Bronte (red), Cavell (yellow), Curie (green) and Keller (blue).
- Colours: Grey, blue and white (uniform Yrs 7-11); black and white (uniform Sixth Form), red, yellow, green (houses)
- Admission: Selective
- School Type: State Grammar (Girls)
- Website: https://www.nghs.org.uk/

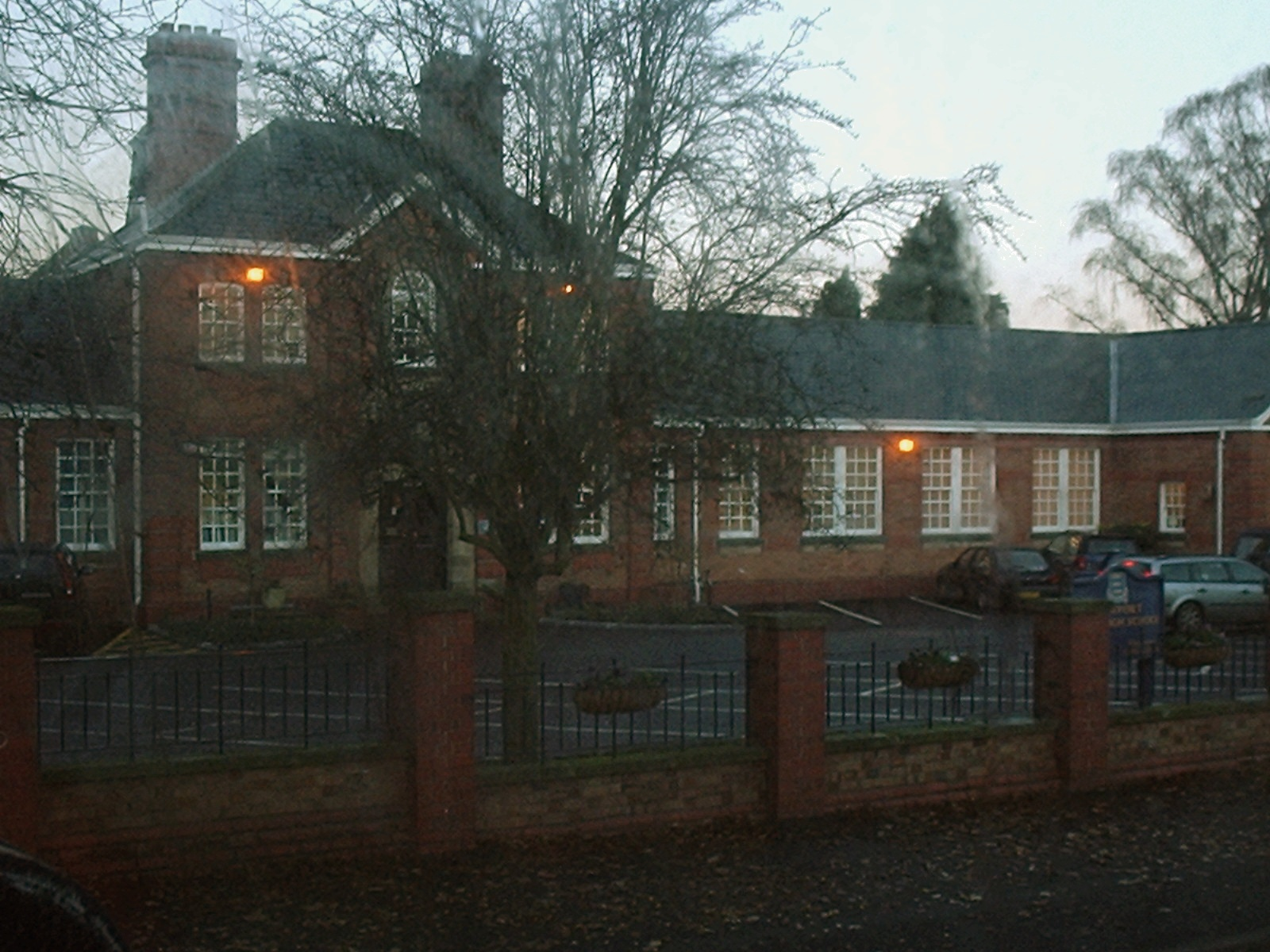
Newport Girls' High School

Newport Girls' High School is an all-girls grammar school with academy status in Newport, Shropshire, England. The school was opened in the 1919 by a group of female governesses as a single-sex day school for local girls. The school is selective and is an all-girls intake with an intake of 120 students per year. Until 2003 the intake was 32 per year, from 2003 56 a year, rising to 84 in 2013 and increasing further to 90 in 2019. The school has also achieved Maths and Computing specialist status. It was named the ‘West Midlands State Secondary School of the Year’ in 2020 by the Sunday Times and the number one school in Shropshire, number 65 in the UK, in the Sunday Times Parent Power Guide 2025.

== Headteachers ==
- Jessie McWean (1877-1971), headmistress 1919-1939. Studied at London, Cambridge and Oxford, formerly at the Barrow-in-Furness secondary school for girls, Senior Mistress for Languages at county secondary in Clapham, London, French Mistress at The Priory School, Shrewsbury.
- Elsie Pascall Ward (1900-1973), headmistress 1939-1945. Daughter of an accountant to a Ragged School Union, born in Brixton, London. Studied in London. Formerly taught at Ashford, Kent, Penzance, and the Girls' Modern School, Bedford.
- Olive Kenyon Crowther (1908-1990), headteacher January 1946- July 1950, formerly Senior Classics Teacher at Pate's Grammar School, Cheltenham and at Altrincham Girls' High School, relinquished her position July 1950 on marrying clergyman Howard Spencer Stanley.
- Dorothy Ray (1916-2008), headteacher September 1950-April 1962. Formerly mathematics teacher at Stoke Park Secondary School, Coventry, at least 1939-41 and potentially evacuated with that school to Atherstone. Left to take up position as headteacher of the Priory Girls' School, Shrewsbury, 1962-July 1976. Retired July 1976.
- Marguerite Freeman Markes (1923-1998), headteacher 1962-December 1968. Left to take up position as headteacher at Chorleywood College, Hertfordshire, a girls' grammar for blind and partially sighted students.
- 1968-70 acting headteacher.
- Miss D. M. Bagnall, headteacher 1970-1980.
- Margaret Mantripp, headteacher 1980-December 1991.
- Kaye Harrison, headteacher January 1992-August 2000.
- Edwina Gleeson, headteacher September 2000-.
- Michael Scott, headteacher January 2018-August 2024, left due to a promotion.
- Adam Jones, headteacher 1 September 2024-

== History ==
Until the establishment of Newport Girls' High School and despite the long-established Adams' Grammar School providing boys' education, the town and its satellite villages had no publicly-funded secondary education for girls. The County Education Committee of Shropshire County Council approved the design of what remains as the street facade of the school in 1920. This was designed by the Committee's architect George Henry Bailey (1856 or 1857-1930) who had practiced in London before moving to Shropshire in 1910. Its neo-Georgian front with white painted sash windows, stone window reveals and brick facing, alongside original wooden entrance doors and internal sky lantern in the main entrance hall, are comparable to other surviving commissions of this period, particularly surviving buildings at Wombridge Infants' School, Oakengates, Weston Rhyn Primary School (the brick later rendered), Maesbury Primary School (closed 2012), Walker Technical College (now residential) and Harlescott Junior School. The main facade were built using Lilleshall common bricks, with cornices of Lilleshall seconds red, although there was criticism within the Committee during building that these bricks were of insufficient quality and the same as being used in local coal mines. The builder A.H.Woodhouse of Hanwood, near Shrewsbury, was paid £12 000 and the building was first occupied in 1925.
