= Kate Alicia Morgan =

Welsh beauty pageant winner and model

- Born: 9 June 1983 (age 41); Cardiff, Wales
- Occupation(s): Model, actress

Kate Alicia Morgan (born 9 June 1983) is a Welsh beauty queen, model and actress. She is the official title holder of Miss Latin America UK 2010 and the first Welsh contestant to win the UK title. She competed in the international finals Miss Latin America of the World 2010, or known in Spanish as Miss America Latina Del Mundo2010, held in Dominican Republic. She appeared in the 2010 Bollywood movie Housefull directed by Sajid Khan alongside Akshay Kumar and former Miss World winner Lara Dutta.

She won the 'Europe's Perfect Woman' title in 2011 and entered the 'World's Perfect Woman' contest in 2013 after taking a break to give birth to her son, Oshan.

Morgan was born in Cardiff. She works as a teacher and also does occasional work as an extra at the BBC's Roath Lock studios in Cardiff Bay.
