= Ruth Bidgood =

Welsh poet and historian (1922–2022)

Ruth Bidgood (née Jones; 20 July 1922 – 4 March 2022) was a Welsh poet and local historian who wrote in English.

== Life and career ==
Ruth Jones was born at Blaendulais, Seven Sisters, near Neath, Wales, on 20 July 1922. Her mother, the former Hilda Garrett, was a teacher. Bidgood's Welsh-speaking father, Rev William Herbert Jones, became vicar of St Mary's Church, Aberavon, where Ruth was brought up. She was educated at a grammar school in Port Talbot, and went on to read English at St Hugh's College, Oxford. During World War II, she served in the Wrens as a coder, at Alexandria in Egypt.

After the war, Bidgood worked in London helping to prepare a new edition of Chambers's Encyclopaedia, but eventually she and her husband, David Bidgood, whom she had married in 1946, moved to Coulsdon in Surrey. She and her husband had two sons and one daughter, Janet (died 2007).

Bidgood and her husband bought a holiday bungalow at Abergwesyn, near Llanwrtyd Wells in Powys. During the 1960s, she became concerned about the construction of reservoirs and introduction of forestries in mid Wales, which she felt adversely affected the life of the region; this influenced her 1970 collection, The Zombie-Makers. In the 1970s, after her husband had left her, she made her home permanently at the bungalow, and began publishing poetry and researches into local history.

Bidgood died at Bryn Gwy residential home in Rhayader, on 4 March 2022, at the age of 99.

== Collections ==
In April 2011 her collection, Time Being, was awarded the Roland Mathias Prize.

A book-length study of Bidgood's work, written by Matthew Jarvis, was published in 2012 by the University of Wales Press in the "Writers of Wales" series. The book was launched together with Bidgood's Above the Forests collection at Aberystwyth Arts Centre on 27 July 2012.

== Works ==
- The Given Time, 1972
- Seven articles in Transactions of the Radnorshire Society, (1974–1980) on Llandewi Hall
- Not Without Homage, 1975
- The Print of Miracle, 1978
- Lighting Candles, 1982
- Kindred, 1986
- The Fluent Moment, 1996
- Abergwesyn: Bwlch y Ddau Faen (1997). Newtown, Powys: Gwasg Gregynog. ISBN 0-948714-72-7
- Singing to Wolves, 2000
- Parishes of the Buzzard, a local history of Abergwesyn
- New and Selected Poems, 2004
- Symbols of Plenty, 2006
- Hearing Voices, 2008
- Time Being, 2009
- Above the Forests, 2012
