= W. S. Jones =

Welsh-language author and scriptwriter

William Samuel Jones (28 May 1920 – 15 November 2007), generally known as W. S. Jones or Wil Sam, was a Welsh-language author, playwright and scriptwriter.

== Life ==
Jones was born in Llanystumdwy, and lived in the Eifionydd region in north Wales for his entire life. He worked as a mechanic before opening his own garage in the village of Llanystumdwy. He registered as a conscientious objector during the Second World War, working in food distribution.

He began writing as a young man and, from 1963 onwards, wrote plays to be performed at the Theatr y Gegin in Criccieth, Gwynedd. In the mid-1970s Jones began writing for television and radio and later becoming a full-time writer writing for television and national newspapers as well as for the stage.

Jones was known for the use of comedy and dialect in his work. Many of his plays contained elements of absurdity and symbolism, leading critics to make connections with the works of Beckett, N.F. Simpson and Ionesco. His most famous character, Ifas y Tryc ('Evans the Truck'), was played by Stewart Jones, a Bafta-Cymru winning actor.

Among his most famous works are his plays, Dinas Barhaus ("Abiding City") (1969), Bobi a Sami ("Bobi and Sami") and Y Sul Hwnnw ("That Sunday") (1981). Other writings include his lecture on the state of Welsh theatre, Y Toblaron ("The Toblarone") (1975), a selection of stories, Dyn y Mwnci ("The Monkey Man") (1979) and a selection of his comic verse, Rhigymau Wil Sam ("The Rhymes of Wil Sam") (2005).

Jones received numerous honours towards the end of his life. In 1995 he won a Bafta Cymru award for his contribution to Welsh theatre. In 2002 Theatr Bara Caws presented a programme in tribute to him, and a Wil Sam festival was held at the National Eisteddfod in Maldwyn in 2003. He was awarded an Honorary MA by Aberystwyth University in 2003, and the following year he received an Honorary Fellowship from Bangor University.

Jones's last work was a Welsh translation and adaptation of The Weir by Conor McPherson which was performed by Cardiff-based company Sherman Cymru in 2009.

== Works ==
- Tair Drama Fer (1962)
- Pum Drama Fer (1963)
- Tŷ Clap (1965)
- Dau Frawd (1965)
- Y Fain (1967)
- Dinas Barhaus: a thair drama arall (1968)
- Mae Rhywbeth Bach (1969)
- Y Toblarôn (1975)
- Dyn y Mwnci (1979)
- Mewn Tri Chyfrwng (1979)
- Y Sul Hwnnw (1981)
- Ifas y tryc (1983)
- Ifas eto fyth! (1987)
- Deg drama Wil Sam (1995)
- Llifeiriau (1997)
- Ifas Eto Fyth (2000)
- Rhigymau Wil Sam (2005)
- Newyddion Ffoltia Mawr (2005)
- Mân bethau hwylus: cymeriadau Eifionydd (2005)

== Sources ==
- W. S. Jones Wil Sam, ed. Gwenno Hywyn (Cyfres y Cewri 5) (Caernarfon:Gwasg Gwynedd, 1985)
- Obituary, The Independent, 20 November 2007
- Obituary, BBC News, 16 November 2007 (Welsh language)
- BBC News, 26 July 2011
- Planet Magazine, May 2009
