= Marged Esli =

Welsh actress (1949–2025)

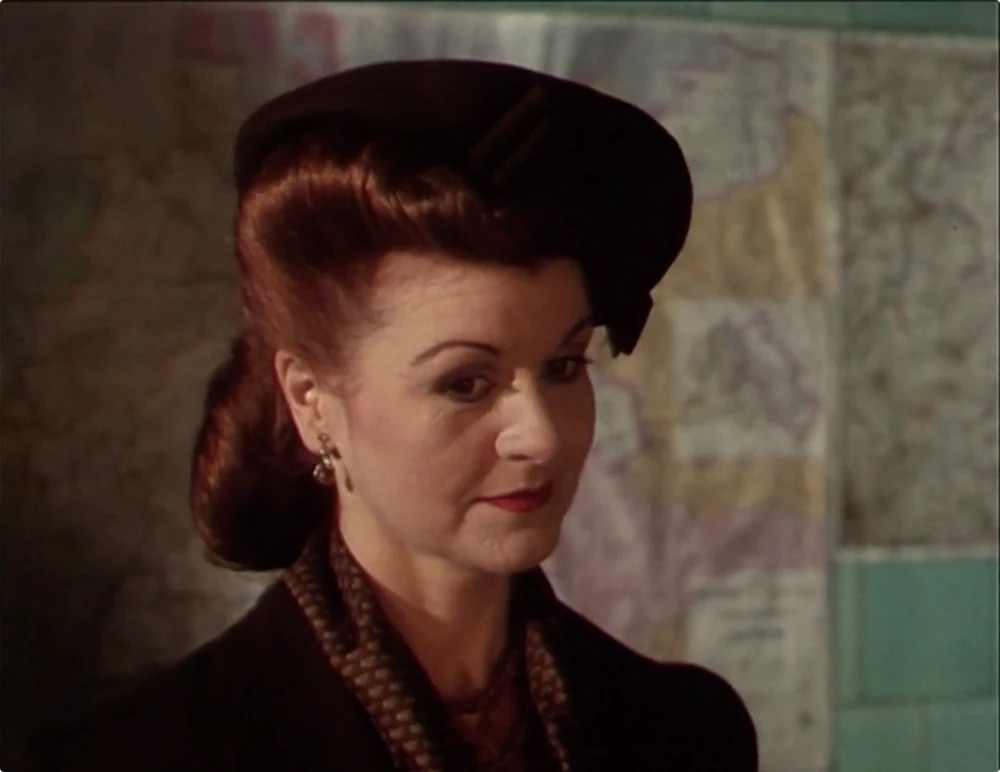
- Esli as Calista in the 1991 film Sigaret
- Born: March 1949
- Died: 1 March 2025 (aged 75)
- Occupation: Actress

Marged Esli (March 1949 – 1 March 2025) was a Welsh actress who was best known for playing Nansi Furlong in the Welsh-language soap opera Pobol y Cwm.

== Life and career ==
Marged Esli Charles-Williams was raised on Bodfeillion farm in Gwalchmai, Anglesey. Her father was a captain in the British Army.

In the 1970s she started working on a number of children's programs for BBC Wales. She composed over 200 songs for the program Bys a Bawd. In 1975 she and Hywel Gwynfryn were the first presenters of the Bilidowcar magazine programme.

Marged died on 1 March 2025, at the age of 75.
