= Alan Llwyd =

Welsh poet and critic born 1948

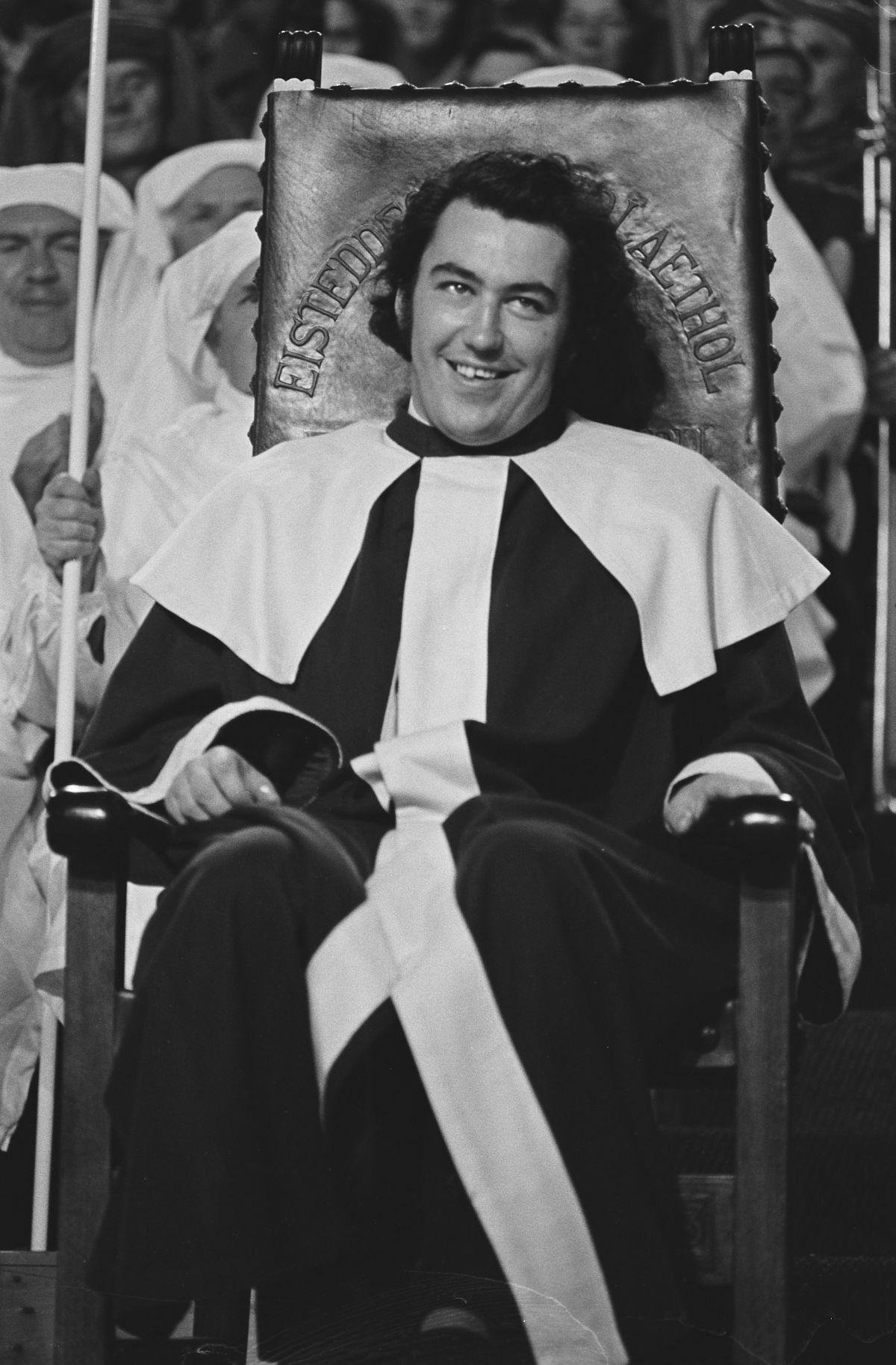
Llwyd at the 1973 National Eisteddfod

Alan Llwyd (born 1948), original name Alan Lloyd Roberts, also known under the Bardic name Meilir Emrys Owen, is a Welsh poet, literary critic and editor. He is one of the most prolific Welsh-language poets of the late 20th and early 21st centuries, and has won the bardic Chair at the National Eisteddfod three times and the Crown twice.

== Upbringing ==
Born in Dolgellau, Gwynedd, Llwyd was brought up on a farm at Cilan and educated at Bangor University. Since then he has been manager of a bookshop at Bala, worked as an editor for the Christopher Davies publishing company, and served as an editorial officer for the Welsh Joint Education Committee.

== Works ==
He published his first volume of poetry, Y March Hud (The Magic Horse), in 1971 as Alan Lloyd Roberts. This was followed by a series of others. He came to prominence with the rare feat of winning both the Crown and the Chair at the 1973 National Eisteddfod and then repeating the feat in 1976. On the second occasion there was some controversy, as another popular poet, Dic Jones, lost out on the chair through a technicality. Llwyd won the Chair for a third time in 2023.

In 1988, Llwyd published Yn y Dirfawr Wag under the pseudonym Meilir Emrys Owen.

Llwyd has published collections and studies of the works of other poets, including Goronwy Owen and Hedd Wyn. He wrote the script for the Oscar-nominated Welsh-language film Hedd Wyn (1992), about the life of the latter, who was killed in World War I. While most of his books have been on literary themes, he also edited Cymru Ddu = Black Wales, a history of black Welsh people. His biography of Kate Roberts was the subject of an S4C programme in which he was interviewed by Ffion Hague.

== Poetic style ==
Llwyd is commonly associated with strict poetic metre, though some of his poems (especially those written under the pseudonym Meilir Emrys Owen) are written in free verse.

== Selected bibliography ==
- Gwyfyn y Gaeaf (1975)
- Rhwng Pen Llŷn a Phenllyn (1976)
- Yn y Dirfawr Wag (1988, as Meilir Emrys Owen)
- Sonedau I Janice a Cherddi Eraill (1996)
- Y Grefft o Greu (1997)
- Ffarwelio â Chanrif (2000)
- Clirio'r Atig a Cherddi Eraill (2005)
- Out of the Fire of Hell: Welsh Experience of the Great War 1914–1918 in Prose and Verse (2008, Gomer Press).
- Stori Hedd Wyn, Bardd y Gadair Ddu (2009) (in English as The Story of Hedd Wyn, the Poet of the Black Chair)
- Kate: y Cofiant (2011; a biography of Kate Roberts)
