= Donald Evans (Welsh poet) =

Welsh poet

Donald Evans (born 1940) is a Welsh poet, who writes in the Welsh language.

Evans comes from Talgarreg in Ceredigion, and was born on a farm. After going to school at Aberaeron, he obtained his degree in Welsh from the University of Wales, Aberystwyth. Between 1966 and 1972 he produced the periodical Y Cardi. He won the "double" of crown and chair twice, once at the 1977 National Eisteddfod of Wales and again in 1980; he is one of only three poets to have achieved this "double double".

In 2006 Evans was awarded a PhD by the University of Wales, Lampeter, for his work on strict-metre Welsh poetry submitted to eisteddfodau in the years 1955 - 1999.

== Works ==
- Parsel Persain (ed.) (1976)
- Y Flodeugerdd o Gywyddau (ed.) (1981)
- Seren Poets Series 2 (with Desmond Graham and Simon Rae) (1990)
- Writers of Wales: Rhydwen Williams (1991)
- Wrth Reddf (1994)
- Y Cyntefig Cyfoes (2000)
