= Geraint Bowen (poet) =

Welsh poet and academic (1915–2011)

Dr. Geraint Bowen (10 September 1915 – 16 July 2011) was a Welsh language poet, academic and political activist.

Born in Llanelli, Carmarthenshire, he was the son of Thomas Orchwy Bowen and Ada Bowen nee Griffiths, the brother of the poet Euros Bowen and nephew of the Carmarthenshire minister David Bowen.

Bowen was brought up in New Quay, Cardiganshire, after his father, Orchwy, became the minister there at Towyn chapel. From grammar school at Aberaeron, he went on to study at University College, Cardiff. After graduating in 1938 in economics and politics, he went on to take an MA in Celtic Studies at the University of Liverpool. Bowen's doctoral thesis was a study of recusant literature in south-east and north-east Wales, and he wrote extensively on this subject and other aspects of Welsh religious history during his academic career. Amongst works published by Bowen were an edition of the recusant Robert Gwyn's Gwssanaeth y gwyr newydd (1970), an edition of Y Drych Kristnogawl (1996) and a history of the Welsh Mormons during the nineteenth century, Ar Drywydd y Mormoniaid (1999). Despite his interest in religious literature and history, he was an avowed atheist.

He was an outspoken Welsh nationalist, and during the Second World War became a conscientious objector, working in farming as an alternative to military service. He stood against Labour, as Plaid Cymru candidate for Wrexham in the 1950 General Election. In 1944, he came to live with his parents in Towynfa in New Quay, where Dylan Thomas was temporarily living in house called Majoda; it has been speculated that Bowen's father, Orchwy, was the inspiration for the Reverend Eli Jenkins in Under Milk Wood.

In 1946, Bowen won the bardic chair at the National Eisteddfod of Wales in Mountain Ash, for his "Awdl Foliant i'r Amaethwr", part of which is written in the rarely used toddaid metre. In 1977 he became editor of Y Faner, and from 1978 to 1981 he presided over the Eisteddfod ceremonies as Archdruid. As Archdruid he was heavily involved in the campaign to force the government to create the promised Welsh-language television channel S4C.

He was also a campaigner against the dumping of nuclear waste and was chairman of the campaign group MADRYN (Mudiad Amddiffyn Dulas Rhag Ysbwriel Niwcliar) in the early 1980s.

In 1947, he married the author, translator and activist, Zonia Margarita North. They had two sons and two daughters.

== Works ==
=== Poetry ===
- Awdl Foliant i'r Amaethwr
- Cân yr Angylion
- T. Gwynn Jones (Y Bardd Celtaidd)
- Cwm Llynor
- Y Drewgoed
- Cywydd y Coroni
- Yr Aran
- Prynhawnddydd
- Dr. Gwenan Jones
- Teyrnged i Gwyndaf
- Cyfarch Bro Myrddin
- Ar Doriad Gwawr
- Branwen

=== Autobiography ===
- O Groth y Ddaear (1993)

=== Books ===
- Welsh recusant writings published in 1999 in English
- Gwssanaeth y gwyr newydd, 1580 by Robert Gwyn published in 1970 in Welsh
- Golwg ar Orsedd y Beirdd by Geraint Bowen published in 1992 in Welsh
- Y traddodiad rhyddiaith yn yr ugeinfed ganrif : (darlithiau Dewi Sant)published in 1976 in Welsh
- Y Traddodiad rhyddiaith (darlithiau Rhydychen) published in 1970 in Welsh
- Y Drych Kristnogawl : llawysgrif Caerdydd 3.240 published in 1996 in Welsh
- Y traddodiadd rhyddiaith yn yr Oesau Canol : (darlithiau Dewi Sant)published in 1974 in Welsh
- Y gwareiddiad Celtaidd published in 1987 in Welsh
- Ar drywydd y Mormoniaid : golwg ar hanes y Mormoniaid Cymreig 1840–80 by Geraint Bowen published between 1998 and 1999 in English and Welsh
- Cerddi by Geraint Bowen published in 1984 in English and Welsh
- Atlas Meirionnydd published in 1974 in Welsh
- Bwyd llwy o badell awen : (cwrs ar y gynghanedd) by Geraint Bowen published in 1977 in English and Welsh
- Hanes Gorsedd y Beirdd by Geraint & Zonia Bowen published in 1991 in Welsh
- Ysgrifennu creadigol : darlithiau Taliesin published in 1972 in Welsh
- Y Drych Kristianogawl : astudiaeth by Geraint Bowen published in 1988 in Welsh
- John Morris-Jones : y diwygiwr iaith a llên by Geraint Bowen published in 1989 in Welsh
- W.J. Gruffydd published in 1994 in Welsh
- Mynegai i cerdd dafod : sef celfyddyd barddoniaeth Gymraeg, John Morris-Jones by Geraint Bowen published in 1947 in English and Welsh
- Penllyn by Geraint Bowen published in 1967 in Welsh

Preceded by Richard Bryn Williams	Archdderwydd of the National Eisteddfod of Wales; 1978–1981	Succeeded by James Nicholas
