= Richard Bryn Williams =

Welsh-Argentine poet and author

Richard Bryn Williams, or Bryn Williams (28 July 1902–26 July 1981), was a Welsh-Argentine writer, poet, playwright and historian. From 1975 to 1978 he was Archdruid of the national Gorsedd of Wales.

== Biography ==
Williams was born in Blaenau Ffestiniog, Gwynedd, Wales. When he was seven years old, his family moved to Trelew, Chubut, Patagonia, Argentina. He returned to Wales in 1923 and studied at the University College of North Wales (now Bangor University). He became an expert on Patagonian history and was a major contributor to the province's literature.

He was a supporter of the National Eisteddfod, as well as competing in the cultural festival itself, and won the chair both in 1964 and 1968, and from 1975 to 1978 he was archdruid, using the bardic name Bryn. Almost all of his numerous works reflect the life of Patagonia and its history.

He died on 26 July 1981 at Camwy, his home in Llanbadarn Fawr.

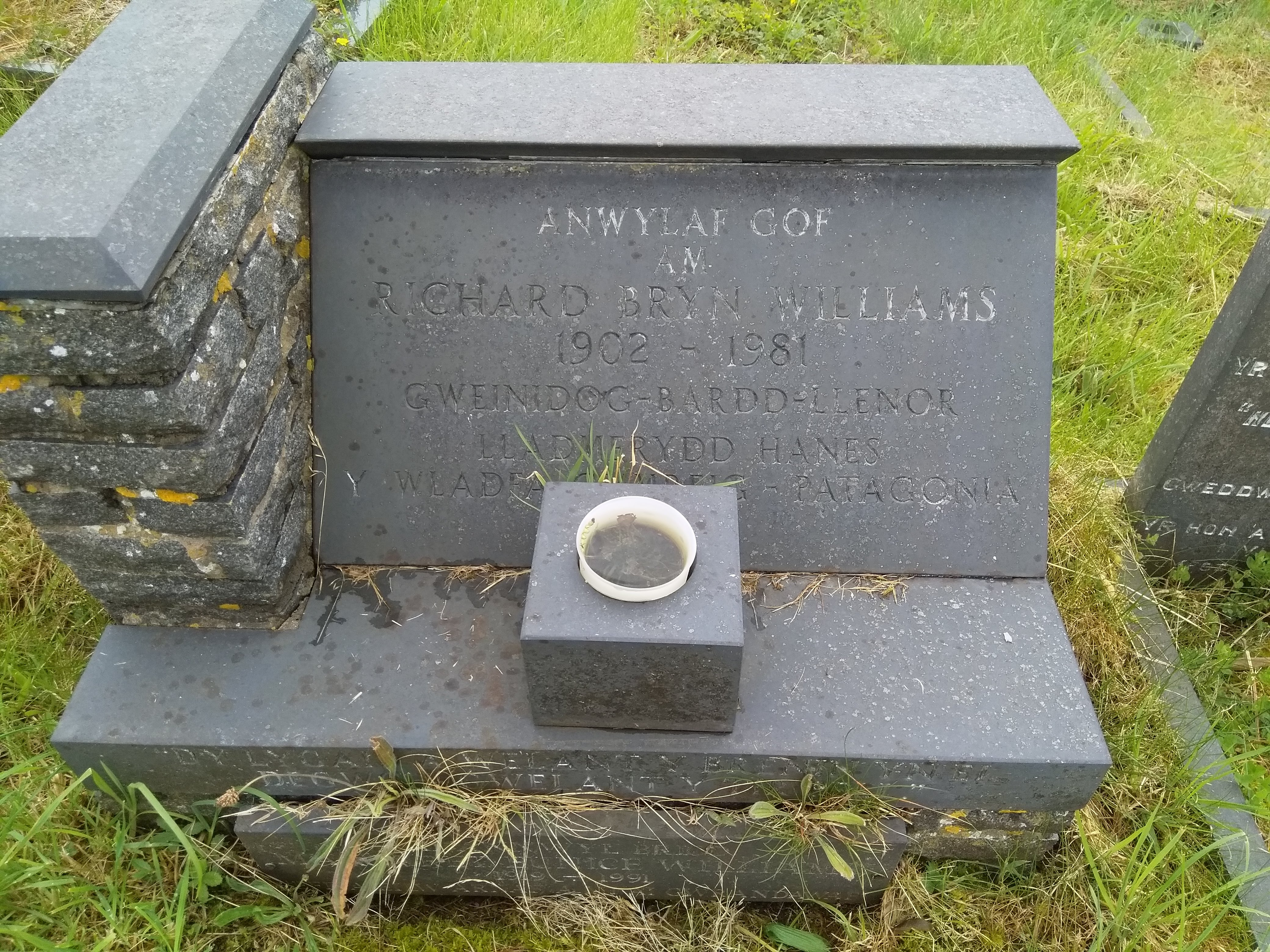
R. Bryn Williams' gravestone in Tywyn Cemetery

He was buried at Tywyn Cemetery and on his gravestone are the words 'GWEINIDOG – BARDD – LLENOR / LLADMERYDD HANES Y WLADFA GYMREIG – PATAGONIA' ('minister – poet – writer / interpreter of the history of the Welsh settlement – Patagonia').

== Literary work ==
Children's books

- Straeon Patagonia (Tales of Patagonia) (1944)
- Y March Coch (The Red Steed) (1954)
- Bandit yr Andes (The Andean Bandit) (1956)
- Croesi'r Paith (Crossing the Steppe) (1958)
- Yn Nwylo'r Eirth (In the Hands of Bears) (1967)
- Y Rebel (The Rebel) (1969)
- Agar (1973)
- Y Gwylliaid (The Bandits) (1976)

Poetry

- Pentewynion (Brands) (1949)
- Patagonia (1965)
- O'r Tir Pell (From the Far Land) (1972)

Plays

- Pedrito (1947)
- Cariad Creulon (Cruel Love) (1970)
- Dafydd Dywysog (Prince David) (1975)

Histories, studies and other books

- Cymry Patagonia (The Welsh of Patagonia) (1942)
- Eluned Morgan: bywgraffiad a detholiad (Eluned Morgan: Biography and selection) (1945)
- Y Wladfa (The Colony) (1962)
- Gwladfa Patagonia 1865–1965 (The Colony of Patagonia) (1965)
- Atgofion o Batagonia (Memories of Patagonia) (1980)
- Crwydro Patagonia (Exploring Patagonia) (1960). (Guidebook)
- Taith i Sbaen (Trip to Spain) (1949). (Travel book)
- Teithiau Tramor (Foreign trips) (1970). (Travel book)
- Prydydd y Paith (1983). (Memoirs, published after his death)

Preceded by Brinley Richards	Archdderwydd of the National Eisteddfod of Wales; 1975–1978	Succeeded by Geraint Bowen
