= BBC Cymru Wales Sports Personality of the Year =

Annal sports award in Wales

- Country: Wales
- Presented by: BBC Cymru Wales
- First award: 1954; 72 years ago
- Currently held by: Benjamin Pritchard (rower) (2025)
- Related: BBC Sports Personality of the Year

The BBC Cymru Wales Sports Personality of the Year is the most prestigious annual sport award in Wales. It was first awarded in 1954, and is currently organised by BBC Cymru Wales. Throughout much of its early history, the award was presented at its own televised ceremony.

Following a trial in 2002, the competition has been open to public voting, rather than a decision being made within the competition prior to this. It later reverted to being chosen by an expert panel of judges.

== Winners ==
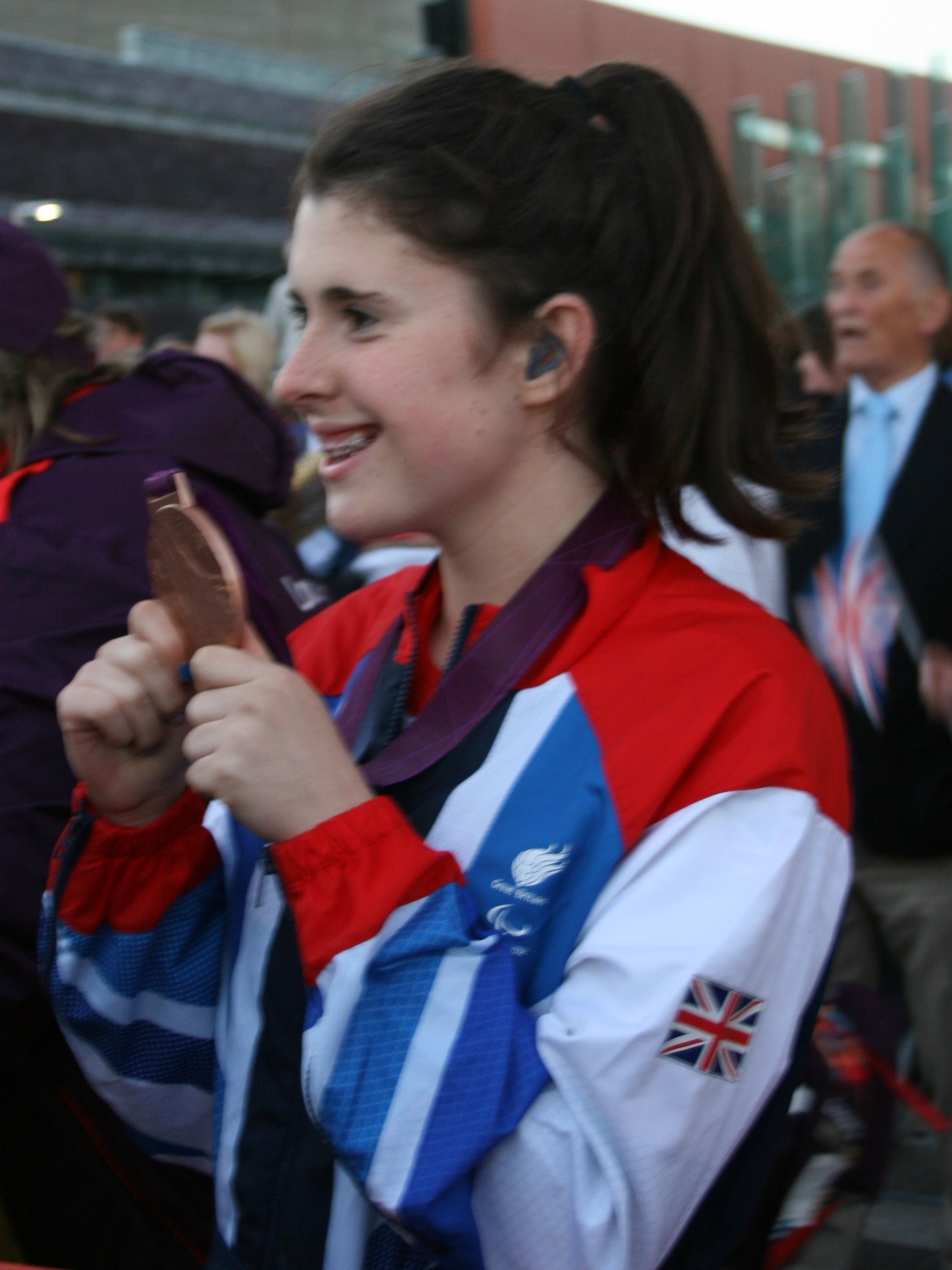
Olivia Breen, 2022 winner

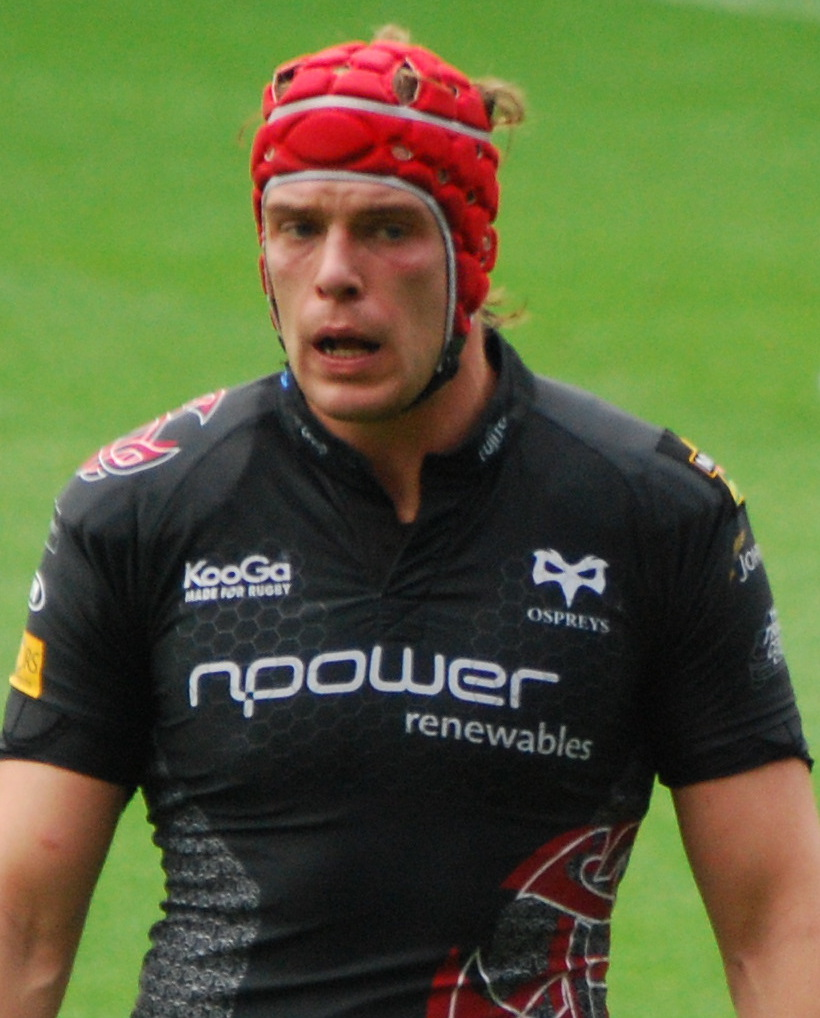
Alun Wyn Jones, 2019 winner

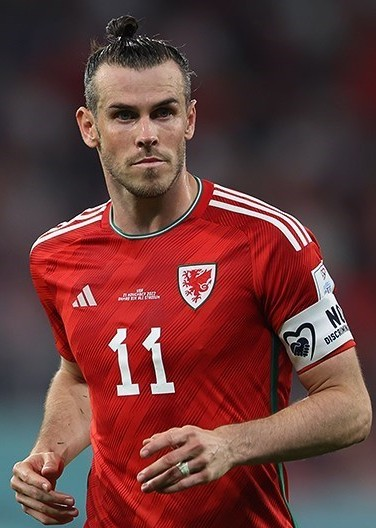
Gareth Bale, 2010 winner.

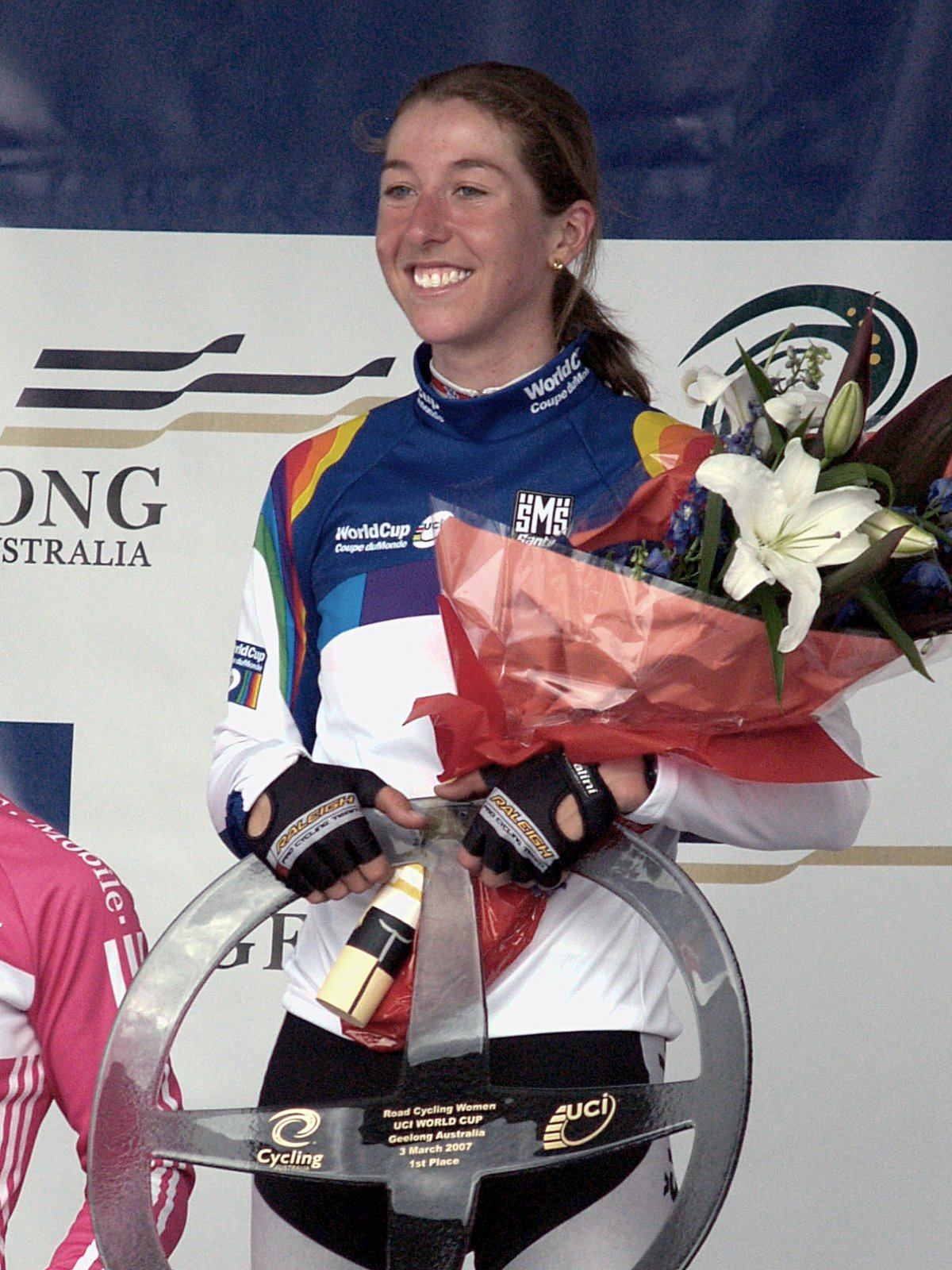
Nicole Cooke, 2003 winner.

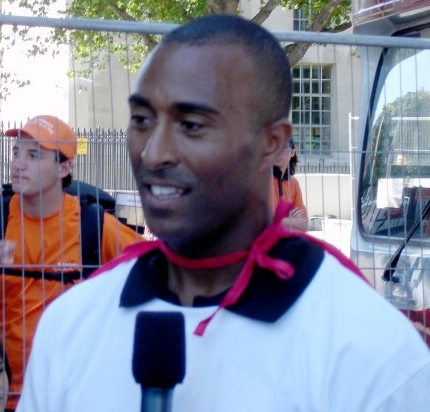
Colin Jackson, three-time winner.

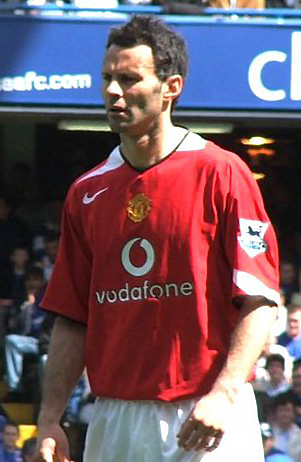
Ryan Giggs, 1996 and 2009 winner.

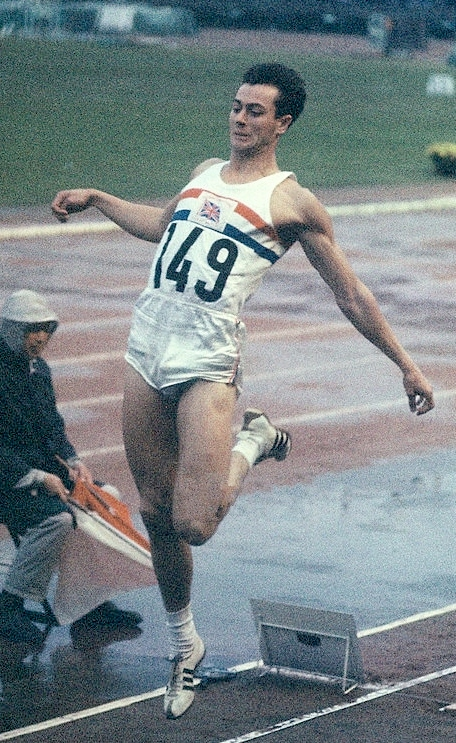
Lynn Davies, 1964 and 1966 winner.

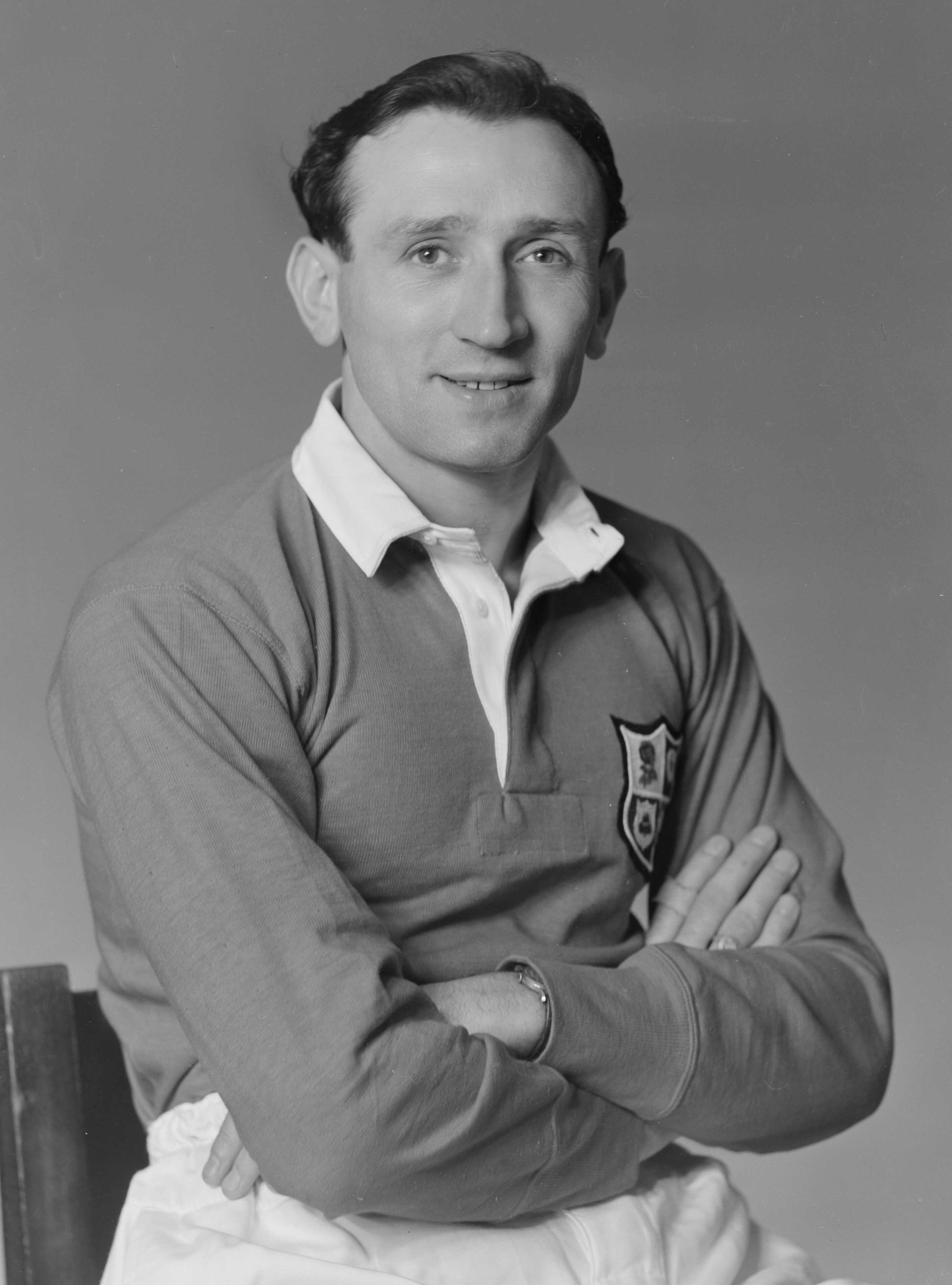
Ken Jones, 1954 winner.

Year	Name	Field
2025	Benjamin Pritchard	Pararowing
2024	Emma Finucane	Track cycling
2023	Emma Finucane	Track cycling
2022	Olivia Breen	Para-athletics
2021	Lauren Price	Boxing
2019	Alun Wyn Jones	Rugby union
2018	Geraint Thomas	Cycling
2017	Jonathan Davies	Rugby union
2016	Jade Jones	Taekwondo
2015	Dan Biggar	Rugby union
2014	Geraint Thomas	Cycling
2013	Leigh Halfpenny	Rugby union
2012	Jade Jones	Taekwondo
2011	Chaz Davies	Motorcycle racing
2010	Gareth Bale	Football
2009	Ryan Giggs	Football
2008	Shane Williams	Rugby union
2007	Joe Calzaghe	Boxing
2006	Joe Calzaghe	Boxing
2005	Gareth Thomas	Rugby union
2004	Tanni Grey-Thompson	Wheelchair racing
2003	Nicole Cooke	Road bicycle racing
2002	Mark Hughes	Football
2001	Joe Calzaghe	Boxing
2000	Tanni Grey-Thompson	Wheelchair racing
1999	Colin Jackson	Athletics (110-metre hurdles)
1998	Iwan Thomas	Athletics (400 metres)
1997	Scott Gibbs	Rugby union
1996	Ryan Giggs	Football
1995	Neville Southall	Football
1994	Steve Robinson	Boxing
1993	Colin Jackson	Athletics (110-metre hurdles)
1992	Tanni Grey-Thompson	Wheelchair racing
1991	Ian Woosnam	Golf
1990	Ian Woosnam	Golf
1989	Stephen Dodd	Golf
1988	Colin Jackson	Athletics (110-metre hurdles)
1987	Ian Woosnam	Golf
1986	Kirsty Wade	Athletics (middle distances)
1985	Steve Jones	Marathon
1984	Ian Rush	Football
1983	Colin Jones	Boxing
1982	Steve Barry	Race walker
1981	John Toshack	Football
1980	Duncan Evans	Golf
1979	Terry Griffiths	Snooker
1978	Johnny Owen	Boxing
1977	Phil Bennett	Rugby union
1976	Mervyn Davies and the Wales national rugby union team	Rugby union
1975	Arfon Griffiths	Football
1974	Gareth Edwards	Rugby union
1973	Berwyn Price	Athletics (100 metres hurdles)
1972	Richard Meade	Eventing
1971	John Dawes, the Wales national rugby union team and the British Lions	Rugby union
1970	David Broome	Show jumping
1969	Tony Lewis	Cricket
1968	Martyn Woodroffe	Swimming
1967	Howard Winstone	Boxing
1966	Lynn Davies	Athletics (long jump)
1965	Clive Rowlands	Rugby union
1964	Lynn Davies	Athletics (long jump)
1963	Howard Winstone	Boxing
1962	Ivor Allchurch	Football
1961	Bryn Meredith	Rugby union
1960	Brian Curvis	Boxing
1959	Graham Moore	Football
1958	Howard Winstone	Boxing
1957	Dai Rees	Golf
1956	Joe Erskine	Boxing
1955	John Disley	Athletics (3000 metre steeplechase)
1954	Ken Jones	Rugby union, Athletics (sprinting)

No award was made in 2020 due to the effects on sport of the COVID-19 pandemic.

== See also ==
- Sport in Wales
- BBC Sports Personality of the Year
