= Eisteddfod =

Type of Welsh festival of literature, music and performance

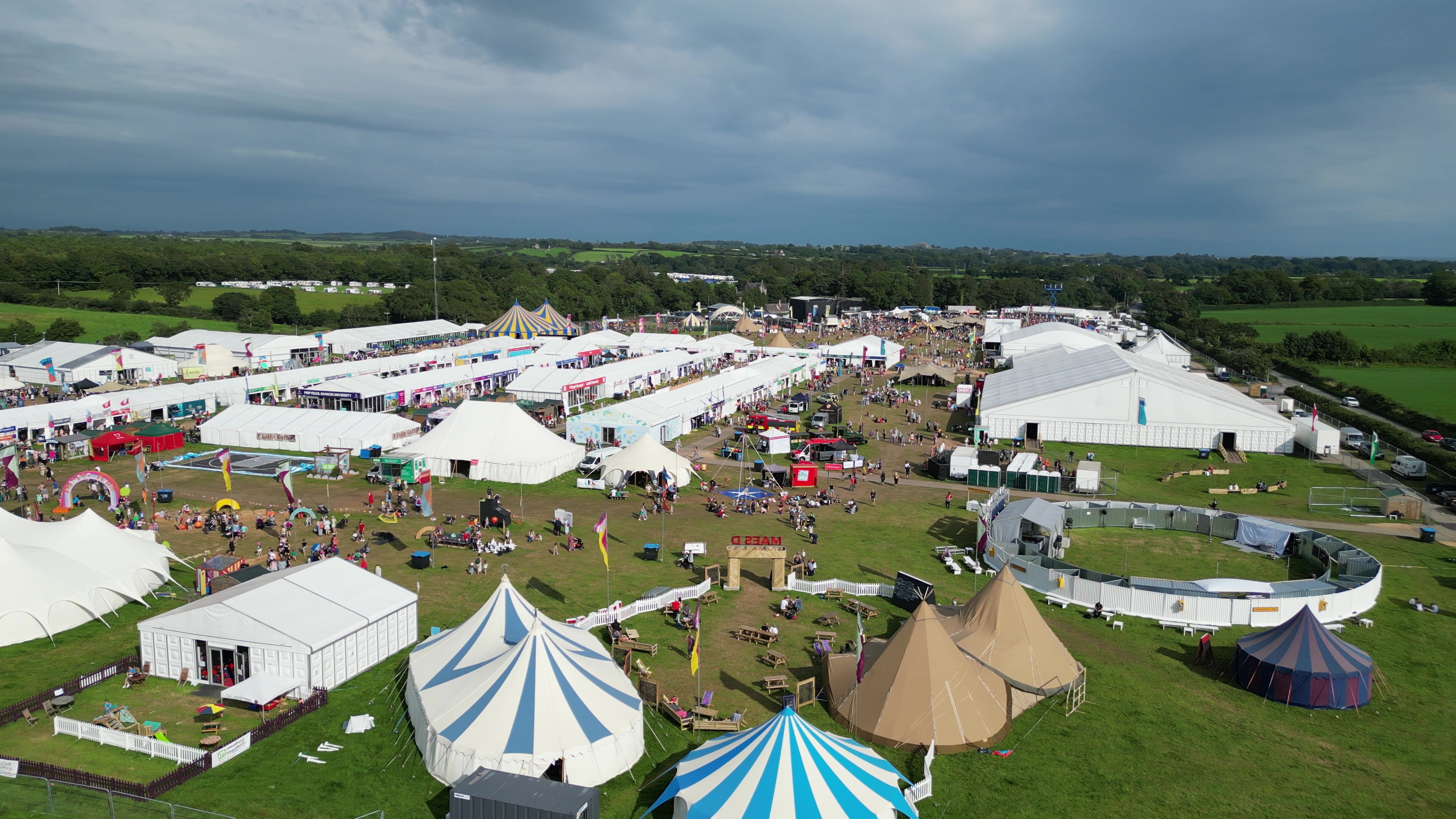
"Y Maes" ('the field') is the main campus and competition venue at an Eisteddfod (aerial photo of the Maes at the 2023 National Eisteddfod of Wales).

In Welsh culture, an eisteddfod (Note: /aɪˈstɛðvɒd/ eye-STEDH-vod, also Welsh: [e(i)ˈstɛðvɔd]; plural eisteddfods or eisteddfodau [e(i)stɛðˈvɔda(ɨ)]) is an institution and festival with several ranked competitions, including in poetry and music. The term eisteddfod, which is formed from the Welsh morphemes: eistedd, meaning 'sit', and fod, meaning 'be', means, according to Hywel Teifi Edwards, "sitting-together." Edwards further defines the earliest form of the eisteddfod as a competitive meeting between bards and minstrels, in which the winner was chosen by a noble or royal patron.

The first documented instance of such a literary festival and competition took place under the patronage of Prince Rhys ap Gruffudd of the House of Dinefwr at Cardigan Castle in 1176. However, with the Edwardian Conquest of Wales, the closing of the bardic schools, and the Anglicisation of the Welsh nobility, it fell into abeyance. The current format owes much to an 18th-century revival, first patronised and overseen by the London-based Gwyneddigion Society. It was later co-opted by Gorsedd Cymru, a secret society of poets, writers, and musicians founded by Iolo Morganwg, whose beliefs were "a compound of Christianity and Druidism, Philosophy and Mysticism."

Despite the Druidic influences and the demonstrably fictitious nature of Iolo Morganwg's doctrines, rituals, and ceremonies, both the Gorsedd and the eisteddfod revival were embraced and spread widely by Anglican and nonconformist clergy. The revival therefore proved enormously successful and is credited as one of the primary reasons for the continued survival of the Welsh language, Welsh literature, and Welsh culture after more than eight centuries of colonialism.

During his two 20th-century terms as Archdruid of Gorsedd Cymru, Albert Evans-Jones, whose bardic name was Cynan and who was a war poet and minister of the Presbyterian Church of Wales, created new rituals for both the Gorsedd and the eisteddfod which are based upon the Christian beliefs of the Welsh people rather than upon Modern Druidry. After watching the initiation of Rowan Williams into the Gorsedd at the 2002 National Eisteddfod, Marcus Tanner wrote that the rituals "seemed culled from the pages of Tolkien's The Lord of the Rings."

Since its 18th-century revival, the eisteddfod tradition has been carried all over the world by the Welsh diaspora. Today's eisteddfodau (plural form) and the National Eisteddfod of Wales in particular, are in equal parts a Renaissance fair, a Celtic festival, a musical festival, a literary festival, and "the supreme exhibition of the Welsh culture."

In some other countries, the term eisteddfod is used for performing arts competitions that have nothing to do with Welsh culture or the Welsh language. In other cases, however, the eisteddfod tradition has been adapted into other cultures as part of the ongoing fight to preserve endangered languages such as Irish, Cornish, Breton, Scottish Gaelic, Canadian Gaelic, Manx, Guernésiais, and Jèrriais.

== Events ==
=== Proclamation ===
As decreed by Iolo Morganwg during the late 18th century, each eisteddfod is proclaimed a year and a day prior to its opening day, by a herald from Gorsedd Cymru.

The proclamation is to read as follows, "When the year of Our Lord ----, and the period of the Gorsedd of the Bards of Britain within the summer solstice, after summons and invitation to all of Wales through the Gorsedd Trumpet, under warning of a year and a day, in sight and hearing of lords and commons and in the face of the sun, the eye of light, be it known that a Gorsedd and Eisteddfod will be held at the town of ----, where protections will be afforded to all who seek privilege, dignity, and license in Poetry and Minstrelsy... And thither shall come the Archdruid and the Gorsedd and others, Bards and Licensiates of the Privilege and Robe of the Bards of the Isle of Britain, there to hold judgment of Chair and Gorsedd on Music and Poetry concerning the muse, conduct, and learning of all that may come to seek the National Eisteddfod honours, according to the privilege and customs of the Gorsedd of Bards of the Isle of Britain:

"Voice Against Resounding Voice
Truth Against the World
God and All Goodness."

=== The Maes ===
An eisteddfod is often held in a field or open central space, called the Maes (Welsh for 'field').

Historian Jan Morris described the National Eisteddfod "in full fig is rather like a military encampment. All its tents and pavilions are erected around a big central space, the Maes, or Field, which is usually scuffed and slippery with mud by the end of the week."

=== Contests ===
According to Morris, "the Eisteddfod is essentially competitive: there are competitions for penillion, and englynion, and male voice choirs, and poems in strict meter, and poems in free metre, and essays, and translations, and plays, and short stories." Also, according to Morris, "outside the Pabell Lên, the Literary Tent, poets mutter couplets to themselves, or exchange bitter Bardic complaints."

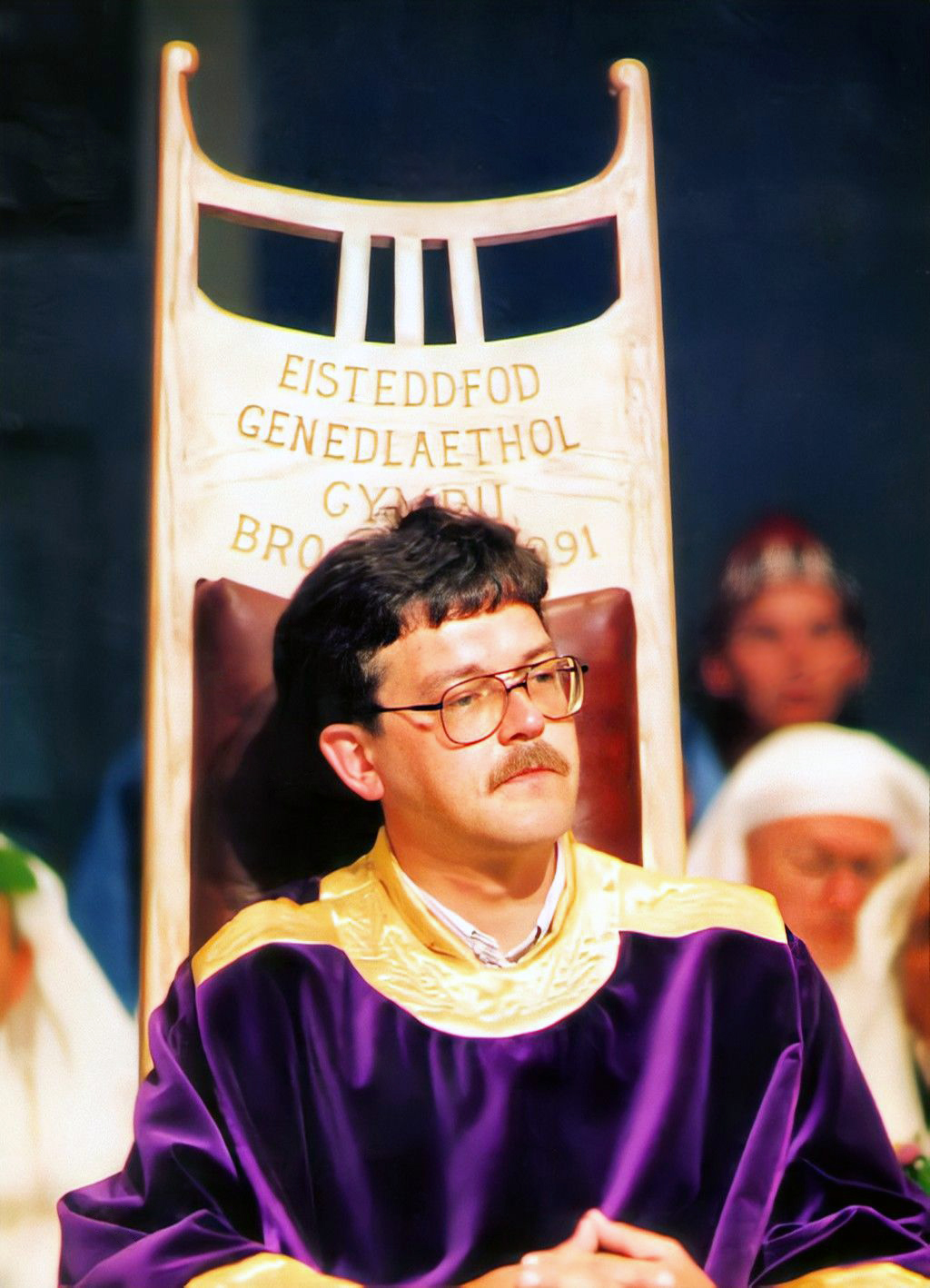
Y Prifardd Robin Owain enthroned after being awarded the bardic chair at the 1991 National Eisteddfod of Wales.

However, the most important events at any eisteddfod are the chairing of the Bard who has written the best awdl, a type of poem in strict meter, based on a title chosen by the judges, and the crowning of the Bard who has written the best pryddest, or poem in free verse, with a similarly predetermined title.

At the National Eisteddfod, the Archdruid of the Gorsedd reveals the identity of the winning poet after the Corn Gwlad (a trumpet) has sounded to the east, west, north, and south to symbolically call the people together from the four corners of Wales. The Gorsedd Prayer is then recited. Flanked by his fellow members of the Gorsedd, as well as the Herald, the Recorder and the Swordbearer, the Archdruid partially withdraws the Great Sword from its sheath three times, and asks, "A oes heddwch?" ('is there peace?'), to which the assembly replies, "Heddwch" ('peace'). The Great Sword is then driven back into its sheath. "Green clad elves come dancing in", escorting a young local married woman, who presents the Horn of Plenty to the Archdruid and urges him to drink of the 'wine of welcome'. A young girl presents him with a basket of 'flowers from the land and soil of Wales' and a floral dance is performed.

The Archdruid then asks one of the judges to comment on the winning entry and explain the reasons why it was chosen. The Archdruid then announces that if the poet or writer whose awdl, pryddest, or essay was submitted under a certain pen name is present, then he or she is to stand up.

In reality the poet has known for some time that they are the winner, but they pretend to be astonished and are raised to their feet and away up to the platform while feigning some resistance, escorted by Druids. The audience rises to its feet and the bard is enthroned upon his Bardic chair.

Winning the chair or the crown competitions, particularly at the National Eisteddfod of Wales, grants even previously unknown poets and writers enormous publicity and prestige. The winner of the bardic chair and crown at the National Eisteddfod both receive the lifelong title prifardd ('chief-bard'). For the same poet to win both the chair and the crown at the same eisteddfod is unusual, but Alan Llwyd and Donald Evans have both succeeded in doing so twice.

The Prose Medal has been awarded at the National Eisteddfod since 1937 and has progressively grown in importance, "but still trails far in the wake of the Chairing and Crowning. The poet is not to be upstaged by novelist, short-story writer, autobiographer, biographer, or what have you. All attempts to transfer the Crown from poetry to prose have been forestalled, the poets rallying to the defense of what is 'rightfully' theirs with the cry of, 'What we have, we hold.'"

At the National Eisteddfod, a Gold Medal (Welsh: Medal Aur) is awarded annually in three categories; Fine Art, Architecture, and Craft and Design. Furthermore, the National Eisteddfod's open exhibition of art and craft, Y Lle Celf ('the art space') is one of the highlights of the calendar for Welsh artists.

== History ==
=== Welsh bardic tradition ===
According to Jan Morris, "Welsh creativity is unusually disciplined, for since the earliest times the Welsh artistic tradition has been governed by codes and conventions – perhaps since the Druids, relying as they did entirely upon their memories, drew up rules of composition to make it easier for themselves. In the Wales of the Independence the Bards and Harpers were institutionalised, with their own allotted places in society, their established functions to perform. They regarded poetry and music as professions, for the practice of which one must qualify, like a lawyer or a doctor. There were agreed measurements of value for a work of art, and the subjects of poetry were formalized, consisting at least until the fourteenth century mainly of eulogies and elegies. Musicians were restricted by intricate rules of composition. Poets were governed by the Twenty-Four Strict Metres of the classical Welsh tradition. Among the Cymry Cymraeg the Metres still prevail."

According to Hywel Teifi Edwards, "The Eisteddfod, then, has evolved from a medieval testing-ground-cum-house of correction for professional Bards and Minstrels into a popular festival which annually highlights the literary scene with the aid of the Gorsedd. Lectures and discussions in Y Babell Lên, followed by reviews of the Cyfansoddiadau a Beirniadaethau in a variety of publications help to encourage a deeper and more abiding interest in Welsh literature. That 'The National' acts as a means of heightening an awareness of language and literature as humanizing forces which no society can neglect with impunity is not too large a claim to make for it."

Also according to Morris, "literature is the first Welsh glory, poetry its apotheosis, and the company of poets is the nobility of this nation."

=== Eisteddfod origins ===
According to Edwards, there is a legend that the first eisteddfod took place at the royal behest of Maelgwn Gwynedd at Conwy during the 6th century. It was Maelgwn's wish that the assembled bards and minstrels would compete against each other. First, however, Maelgwn decreed that they must all swim the River Conwy first and that the minstrels must do so carrying the harps on their backs. For this reason, the bards, whom Maelgwn favoured, ended up winning the contest.

According to legend, Gruffudd ap Cynan (1055–1137), the Dublin-born King of Gwynedd from the House of Aberffraw and the descendant of Rhodri Mawr, Sigtrygg Silkbeard, and Brian Boru, not only reformed the Welsh bardic schools to accord with those that trained the Irish language bards, but also served as patron to an eisteddfod at Caerwys during his reign.

=== 1176 Cardigan eisteddfod ===
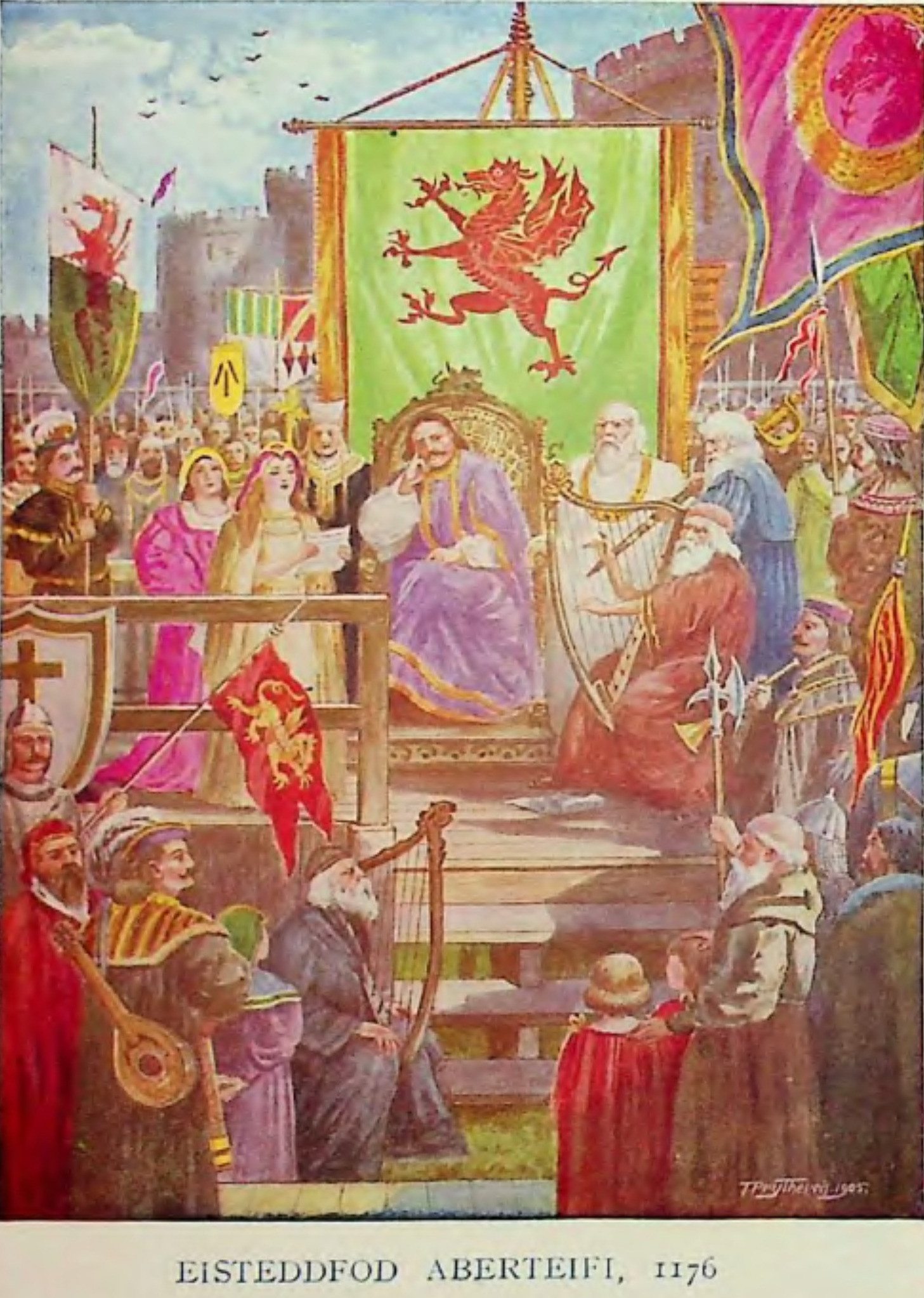
A depiction of the 1176 Eisteddfod Aberteifi in a 1930 schoolbook

The first documented 'eisteddfod' was hosted by Rhys ap Gruffydd, the grandson of Gruffudd ap Cynan through the maternal line and monarch of Deheubarth through his paternal descent from the House of Dinefwr, at Cardigan Castle on Christmas Day, 1176. According to Hywel Teifi Edwards, what few details are recorded of the event in the Brut y Tywysogion, "encourage the view that it could not have been the first of its kind."

Rhys awarded two chairs as prizes, one for the winner of the poetry competition and the other for music. The bardic chair went to a poet from Gwynedd, while the musical chair went to the son of Eilon the Crythwr, a member of Rhys's court. Armchairs were a valuable asset, normally reserved for people of high status.

In 2007, Welsh historian Roger Turvey, writing of Dinefwr Castle, suggested that The Lord Rhys's idea for a competitive festival of music and poetry at Cardigan Castle may have been inspired by similar contests in other parts of Catholic Europe. The Lord Rhys, Turvey suggested, may have learned about the Puy tradition from the Cambro-Normans in the Welsh Marches or from Welsh mercenary soldiers returning from France.

In those other countries, aspiring poets were trained through apprenticeship to master craftsmen or by attending schools run by poets' guilds such as the Puy of France, the Meistersingers of the Holy Roman Empire, or the Rederijkerskamers of the Netherlands, all of which also organized eisteddfod-like contests between poets on patronal feast days of the Roman Catholic liturgical year.

=== Medieval Wales ===
The next large-scale eisteddfod that is historically known is the three-month-long 1450 eisteddfod at Carmarthen Castle under Gruffudd ap Nicolas. At the eisteddfod the Cadair Arian ('silver chair'), which is said to have been fashioned by Gruffudd ap Nicolas himself, was won by a cywydd in honour of the Holy Trinity composed by Dafydd ab Edmwnd, a Welsh poet who did not depend on noble patronage, from Hanmer, Flintshire. Welsh poet and Roman Catholic priest Llawdden, however, accused Gruffudd ap Nicolas of accepting a bribe from Dafydd ab Edmwnd in return for the Silver Chair.

Dafydd ab Edmwnd's cywydd exemplified the 24 strict metres of Welsh poetry, previously codified by Einion Offeiriad and Dafydd Ddu o Hiraddug, as Dafydd ab Edmwnd had personally reformed them. He deleted two metres and replaced them with the more complicated Gorchest y Beirdd and the Cadwynfyr.

The reform of the 24 metres presented by Dafydd was formally accepted at the 1450 Carmarthen eisteddfod and was widely adopted by bards throughout Wales. The consequence of Dafydd's reforms was that greater emphasis was placed by the bardic elite upon adhering to the stricter metres rather than to the theme or content of their poetry.

Until this time, the training of Welsh poets had always been a secret, with the craft handed down from teacher to apprentice, but, as the poetry of the professional bards became increasingly incomprehensible, less complex and more popularly oriented works of Welsh poetry began to be composed by bards with humbler origins and less formal training.

According to John Davies, a team of researchers led by Dafydd Bowen has demonstrated that the Welsh bards of the 15th century were completely dependent upon the Welsh nobility and the monks and abbots of monasteries such as Strata Florida and Valle Crucis Abbey for both hospitality and patronage in return for praise poetry. Davies adds, however, that, "in a notable article", Welsh nationalist and traditional Catholic writer Saunders Lewis argued that the Welsh bards of the era, "were expressing in their poetry a love for a stable, deep-rooted civilization." Lewis added that the bards "were the leading upholders of the belief that a hierarchical social structure, 'the heritage and tradition of an ancient aristocracy', were the necessary precondition of civilized life and that there were deep philosophical roots to this belief."

The next eisteddfod that is historically documented is the 1451 Carmarthen eisteddfod.

In 1523, an eisteddfod was held at Caerwys under King Henry VIII's charter and was led by Welsh bard and future Franciscan friar, Tudur Aled. At the urging of the aristocratic Mostyn family of Talacre Hall, a Statute, which was attributed to King Gruffydd ap Cynan of Gwynedd, was used as the basis for the eisteddfod. The Statute listed the rights of bards in Welsh culture and under traditional Welsh law, while also arguing that bards should not drink to excess, womanize, or gamble. In addition, the Statute further stated that a true bard must never write satirical poetry and codified the rules of praise poetry at a time when the Welsh bardic tradition of was increasingly under threat and, "demanded that the bard celebrate in elevated language the orderliness of a God-centered world."

=== The Welsh Reformation ===
Queen Elizabeth I of England commanded that Welsh bards be examined and licensed by officials of the Crown, who had alleged that those whom they considered genuine bards were, "much discouraged to travail in the exercise and practice of their knowledge and also not a little hindered in their living and preferments." Unlicensed bards, according to Hywel Teifi Edwards, "would be put to some honest work." Although Edwards has compared the unlicensed bards of the era with, "today's abusers of the Social security system," historian Philip Caraman quotes a 1575 "Report on Wales" that reveals an additional reason for the decree. During the Queen's ongoing religious persecution of the Catholic Church in England and Wales, many Welsh Pencerddau ('head bards') were, according to the report, acting as the secret emissaries of Recusants in the Welsh nobility and were helping those nobles spread the news about secret Catholic masses and pilgrimages.

In 1583 Welsh Recusant, schoolmaster, and unlicensed bard Richard Gwyn was put on trial for high treason before a panel of judges headed by the Chief Justice of Chester, Sir George Bromley, at Wrexham. Gwyn stood accused of refusing to take the Oath of Supremacy, denying the Queen's claim to be Supreme Head of the Church of England, of involvement in the local Catholic underground, but also of composing satirical poetry aimed at the established church and reciting, "certain rhymes of his own making against married priests and ministers." Gwyn was found guilty and condemned to death by hanging, drawing and quartering. The sentence was carried out in the Beast Market in Wrexham on 15 October 1584. Just before Gwyn was hanged he turned to the crowd and said, "I have been a jesting fellow, and if I have offended any that way, or by my songs, I beseech them for God's sake to forgive me." The hangman pulled at Gwyn's leg irons hoping to put him out of his pain. When he appeared dead they cut him down, but he revived and remained conscious through the disembowelling, until his head was severed. His last words, in Welsh, were reportedly "Iesu, trugarha wrthyf" ('Jesus, have mercy on me').

Following Catholic Emancipation in 1829, six works of Christian poetry in the Welsh language by Richard Gwyn, five carols and a satirical Cywydd composed in Wrexham Gaol following the assassination of Dutch Revolt leader William the Silent by Balthasar Gérard, were discovered and published. Similar Welsh poetry in strict metre survives from other Recusant Bards of the era, such as Robert Gwin, Catrin ferch Gruffudd ap Hywel, and Gruffydd Robert.

Despite their battles being so similar to his own against government censorship, Sir Philip Sidney, in An Apology for Poetry, expressed both admiration for and envy of the prestige that poets enjoyed in Welsh culture, which he contrasted with what he described as the Elizabethan era tendency in English culture to treat poets as unwanted stepchildren, "In Wales, the true remnant of the ancient Brittons, as there are good authorities to show, the long time they had poets which they called Bards: so through all the conquests of Romans, Saxons, Danes, and Normans, some of whom, did seek to ruin all memory of learning from among them, yet do their poets even to this day last: so as it is not more notable in the soon beginning, then in long continuing."

Likely due to the continued existence of Recusant Bards, the 1567 and 1568 Caerwys eisteddfodau were patronised by the Queen, so that, "all or every person or persons that intend to maintain their living by name or colour of Minstrelsy, rhymers, or bards... shall.. shew their learning thereby", and overseen by the officials of her Council of Wales and the Marches. By royal decree, only Welsh bards licensed by the officials of the Queen were permitted to compete.

At the eisteddfod held in Caerwys in 1568, the prizes awarded were a miniature silver chair to the winning poet, a little silver crwth to the winning fiddler, a silver tongue to the best singer, and a tiny silver harp to the best harpist. The chief chaired bard of the event was Robert Davies (from Nantglyn) and the second being "Twm o'r Nant".

The official Anglican translation of the Bible into the Welsh language, first published in 1588, continues to have an enormous influence on the Welsh poetry submitted to the eisteddfodau. The translator, Reverend William Morgan, based his Biblical translation on the Hebrew and Greek original Bibles, while also consulting the English Bishops' and Geneva translations. Y Beibl cyssegr-lan, as it was called, also included original translations as well as adaptations of William Salesbury's Welsh New Testament. No other book in the Welsh language has been anywhere near as influential in linguistic or literary terms. Bishop Morgan skillfully moulded the Middle Welsh literary language of the medieval bards (Yr Heniaith, or 'the old language') into the Elizabethan-era Cymraeg Llenyddol ('literary Welsh') still in use today. Even though there is a major difference between Cymraeg Llenyddol and all 21st century spoken dialects of the Welsh language, eisteddfod submissions are still required to be composed in the literary language of Bishop Morgan's Bible, which remains the foundation upon which all subsequent Welsh literature has been built.

=== Decline ===
According to Marcus Tanner, Queen Elizabeth I's experiment at royal patronage of the eisteddfod did not catch on, and as the 16th and 17th centuries progressed, the Welsh nobility became increasingly Anglicised and ceased to grant employment or hospitality to Welsh-language poets. Although eisteddfodau continued, the gatherings became more informal; Welsh poets would often meet in taverns, cemeteries, or inns to have "assemblies of rhymers". But the interest of the Welsh people dwindled to such a point that the eisteddfod held at Glamorgan in 1620 attracted an audience of only four people. The winners, however, continued to receive a chair, which was a highly prized award because of its perceived social status.

Throughout the medieval period, high-backed chairs with arm rests were reserved for royalty and high-status leaders in military, religious, or political affairs. As most ordinary people sat on stools until the 1700s, the award of an armchair immediately changed the social class of a winning bard.

In 1701, an eisteddfod was held at Machynlleth in order "to begin to renew the eisteddfod of bards (as they were in olden times), to reprimand false cynghanedd, to explain the difficult things, and to confirm what is correct in the art of poetry in the Welsh language."

The 1701 eisteddfod was followed, according to Edwards, by a series of Eisteddfodau'r Almaciau, so called because they were widely advertised in the cheap almanacs that were widely available. The englynion and cywyddau composed for these events "owe more to the beery atmosphere at which they were composed than to genuine inspiration and craft."

In 1734, Siôn Rhydderch organised an eisteddfod adjudicated by a panel of 12 judges at Dolgellau, but upon his arrival there was greeted by only six poets, "and all the signs of apathy and dejection."

Comparing this disappointing response to what he saw as the glory of the Elizabethan-era eisteddfodau at Caerwys, Rhydderch vowed that he would have no role in further efforts to revive the tradition, "unless some others may feel like restarting and setting up the thing. And if it will be like that, if I am alive and well, I shall not be hindered from coming to that."

=== Late 18th century revival ===
In 1788, Thomas Jones and Jonathan Hughes asked the London-based Gwyneddigion Society to donate "some small present out of goodwill to those who are trying to crawl after their mother tongue."

Although the Gwyneddigion Society agreed, they laid down certain conditions for their support that permanently altered the future course of the eisteddfod and its traditions. The Gwyneddigion claimed for themselves the right to proclaim both the eisteddfod and the theme of the main competition which they alone would set, one year in advance. The poems were to be submitted under pseudonyms and would be adjudicated solely upon their literary merits. The poems and the adjudicator's comments would then be forwarded to the eisteddfod in a sealed package. The adjudicators were to be able men for the job and were to choose the winning entry based upon "purity of language and regular composition of the poems to be among their chief merits."

The adjudicators were to meet together and give an impartial decision and, in the event of any disagreement, the Gwyneddigion would endeavour to resolve the dispute. The name of the winning poet would be announced upon the first day of the eisteddfod and, owing to the dignity of his status as Pencerdd, the winner was not to compete alongside the other poets in the composition of impromptu verse.

In so doing, the Gwyneddigion laid down the framework for the modern National Eisteddfod of Wales. According to Hywel Teifi Edwards, "there was to be notice given a year in advance of one organized, annual eisteddfod answerable to a central, controlling authority which would require competitors to submit their compositions pseudonymously to a panel of competent adjudicators."

Although the Gwyneddigion did not succeed in their ambition of transforming the eisteddfod "into an Academy that would act as a forcing house for Welsh culture", they have wielded considerable influence over continued requirement for long poems as eisteddfod submissions. Furthermore, in reaction to the incomprehensibility of Welsh poetry composed in strict meter, the Gwyneddigion held up the recent poetry of Reverend Goronwy Owen as a better model.

Long before his death on his tobacco and cotton plantation near Lawrenceville, Virginia in 1769, Owen had often expressed the desire to compose an epic work of Christian poetry which would be the equal of John Milton's Paradise Lost. Owen felt, however, that the rules of Welsh poetry in strict meter prevented him from doing so. Therefore, by holding Owen up as a model, the Gwyneddigion ensured that his literary legacy is that, as late as 1930, both the adjudicators and the poets composing submissions to the National Eisteddfod of Wales were aspiring to produce the Welsh national epic that Owen had longed to write in vain.

The first eisteddfod of the revival, for which "Thomas Jones simply used" the name of the Gwyneddigion "for promotional purposes", was held at Corwen in May 1789. Gwallter Mechain was judged the winner, having illegally been informed in advance by Thomas Jones of the subjects for the impromptu poetry contests. Despite outraged complaints by Gwallter Mechain's competitors, the Gwyneddigion upheld the judges' decision.

The first eisteddfod held in full accordance with the Gwyneddigion Society's new rules was held at Bala in September 1789. The awdlau that were submitted for the bardic chair were on the theme Istyriaeth ar Oes Dyn ('a consideration of man's life') and, according to Edwards, "heralded the appearance of the new awdl."

According to Hywel Teifi Edwards, while the awarding of a chair is a very old tradition, the now-familiar ceremony of the chairing of the bard who has composed the best awdl dates from the eisteddfod revival of the early 1790s.

During the 1790 eisteddfod held at St. Asaph, Gwyneddigion Society member Edward Williams, whose bardic name was Iolo Morganwg, became convinced that he and his fellow Welsh poets were the descendants of the Druids and that the eisteddfod was a survival of Druidic ritual. In response, Iolo Morganwg, according to Marcus Tanner, "reintroduced what he considered the ritual of an ancient Bardic congress to a series of rather ordinary literary proceedings conducted chiefly in hotels."

To accomplish this end, in 1792 Iolo Morganwg founded a secret society of Welsh poets, which he dubbed Gorsedd Beirdd Ynys Prydain. Morganwg also invented its structure and rituals, for which he drew upon on a mixture of Freemasonry, Welsh mythology, modern Druidry, and some Christian elements. Morganwg alleged, however, that the Gorsedd was a survival from pre-Christian Wales. The fictitious origin of Morganwg's claims and of the Gorsedd's ceremonies was firmly established only in the 20th century by Professor G.J. Williams.

In October 1792, The Gentleman's Magazine reported, "This being the day on which the autumnal equinox occurred, some Welsh bards resident in London assembled in congress on Primrose Hill, according to ancient usage... A circle of stones formed, in the middle of which was the Maan Gorsedd, or altar, on which a naked sword being placed, all the Bards assisted to sheathe it. This ceremony was attended with a proclamation, the substance of which was that the Bards of the Isles of Britain (for such is their ancient name) were the heralds and ministers of peace."

In 1814, an observer caught sight of Iolo Morganwg walking behind a banner at Pontypridd, "at the head of a procession... over the great bridge and then over to the Rocking Stone on the common above. Ancient ceremonies were performed on the great stone by Iolo in the role of Y Gwyddon, or Odin, the Archdruid, not the least being the sheathing the State Sword of Wales to convey the valuable lesson, as in Gethsemane, that there is more credit in sheathing the sabre than in drawing it forth among the sons of men."

The eisteddfod revival, however, was briefly brought to a halt by the Napoleonic Wars, but was again restarted following the Battle of Waterloo in 1815.

=== 1801–1860 ===
The earliest known surviving bardic chair made specifically for an eisteddfod was constructed in 1819. Iolo Morganwg and the Gorsedd made their first appearance at the same eisteddfod, which was held at the Ivy Bush Inn at Carmarthen in 1819, and its close association with the festival has continued since then.

Also at the 1819 Carmarthen eisteddfod, Iolo Morganwg presented a freer code of meters. While still defending the superiority of cynghanedd, Morganwg said this had also been used in Gwent and Glamorgan for centuries prior to Dafydd ab Edmwnd's 15th century reforms. This led, after considerable debate between traditionalists and innovators, to the adoption of the eisteddfod contest for best pryddest and the ceremony of the crowning of the bard.

Meanwhile, Archdeacon Thomas Beynon, the president of the Carmarthen Cymreigyddion Society and a staunch patron of the provincial eisteddfodau, was persistently urging for the adoption of blank verse, or unrhymed iambic pentameter, as another alternative to Welsh poetry in strict meter.

Meanwhile, all poems submitted to eisteddfodau began being published in 1822, which allowed for the first time for the Welsh people to read the poems and to decide for themselves about their merits and flaws.

At the 1824 National Eisteddfod in Powys, satirical poetry in the traditional englyn form was submitted under the pre-announced title "Beddargraff Dic Siôn Dafydd" ('the epitaph of Dic Siôn Dafydd').

According to Hywel Teifi Edwards, "Ten 'Provincial Eisteddfodau' were held between 1819 and 1834, eisteddfodau on a scale never witnessed before. They were patronized by Anglicized gentry and graced by royalty when George IV's brother, the Duke of Sussex, appeared at Denbigh in 1828 to be followed at Beaumaris in 1832 by the young Princess Victoria and her mother."

Following the 1847 attack by the Blue Books against the moral character of the Welsh people, Welsh poetry composed for the eisteddfodau "found itself trapped within the part allotted the Welsh language in the counterattack against the Blue Books." For this reason, much of the poetry written sought to promote an image of the Welsh people as "God-fearing, Queen-loving", and, "Empire-supporting."

At the 1850 Rhuddlan Royal Eisteddfod, £25 and a Chair Medallion were offered for the best Pryddestawd on the theme Yr Adgyfodiad ('the resurrection'). The poets were allowed to choose the meter, excluding blank verse, that best suited them. Caledfryn submitted an awdl, while Eben Fardd and Evan Evans (Ieuan Glan Geirionydd) submitted Alexandrine Pryddestau. In a judgment unheard-of in Eisteddfod history: Ieuan Glan Gerionydd's Alexandrine Pryddest was judged superior and was awarded the £25 and Chair Medallion over Caledfryn's Awdl in strict metre.

Upon the publication of all the Eisteddfod's submissions, however, Eben Fardd's attempt at an epic work of Christian poetry was "hailed by the literati as a work of distinction far surpassing the pallid, common-sense poem written by Ieuan Glan Gerionydd". As Eben Fardd's Pryddest had been relegated to third place by the judges, it was widely felt that something was seriously wrong with adjudication standards and "talk of eisteddfod reform was in the air."

In 1858 John Williams, whose bardic name was Ab Ithel, held a "national" eisteddfod with Gorsedd Cymru in Llangollen. "The great Llangollen Eisteddfod of 1858" proved highly significant for several reasons. For example, John Williams (the event's organiser), offered £20 and a Silver Star for the best essay on the theme, The Discovery of America in the 12th-century by Prince Madoc ab Owain Gwynedd. This was, according to Hywel Teifi Edwards, a subject inspired by Iolo Morganwg.

Instead, Welsh historian Thomas Stephens submitted an essay that, in what Edwards has described, as a "scholarly tour de force, demolished the cherished myth". In response, Ab Ithel decreed, "that the essay broke with the spirit of the competition", and would not be awarded the prize. In response, a scandalised crowd followed Stephens into the Cambrian Tent, where he read his essay aloud before them despite Ab Ithel's efforts to drown him out with a convenient brass band. Despite having been denied the prize, Stephens succeeded in persuading his audience that Prince Madoc did not in fact discover the New World.

The Llangollen eisteddfod also saw the first public appearance of John Ceiriog Hughes, who won a prize for the love poem, Myfanwy Fychan of Dinas Brân, which contradicts the Blue Books by describing a virtuous Welsh woman. As may be expected, the song became an instant hit. This eisteddfod outraged the English-language press. The Daily Telegraph called it "a national debauch of sentimentality". A writer for The Times went even farther, calling the eisteddfod "simply foolish interference with the natural progress of civilization and prosperity – it is a monstrous folly to encourage the Welsh in a loving fondness for their old language."

Before the 1858 Llangollen eisteddfod was over, however, a meeting of Welsh literati had taken place and decided that an annual national eisteddfod, conducted with due regard for standards, was long overdue. Yr Eisteddfod, a national body guided by an elected council, was formed and the Gorsedd subsequently merged with it. The Gorsedd holds the right of proclamation and of governance while the council organises the event. The first true National Eisteddfod organised by the council was held in Aberdare in 1861 on a pattern that continues to the present day.

=== 1861–1900 ===
According to Hywel Teifi Edwards, "The 1860s found the eisteddfod poet beset with doubt, as the words of Eben Fardd and Talhaiarn (John Jones 1810–69), two of the foremost poets of the time, prove. Both accepted the subservience of their mother tongue and the diminished role of the poet in the steam age. If poetry per se was of questionable value, how much more so Welsh poetry, and strict meter poetry at that? What could be less marketable in an age that marketed English was with progress than Welsh poetry? It was galling when Fleet Street taunted Wales with its want of a Shakespeare, a Milton, a Wordsworth or a Tennyson. It was shattering when Matthew Arnold, scourge of philistinism and hawker of Celtic magic, insisted that any Welsh poet with anything worth saying should say it in English. Edward Dafydd, in 1655, expressed the sense of desolation he felt as he pondered the passing of the old order and the coming of a bleak age: Nid yw'r bid hwn gyda'r beirdd ('this world is not for poets.') He could well have been speaking for the poets of the 1860s."

Also during the Victorian era, the poets who won the chair or the crown at the National Eisteddfod were praised to a degree that subsequent literary critics and historians have found not only excessive, but "ludicrous". According to Edwards, however, "It is easy to laugh at the besotted rhetoric of the period, but let us remember how starved of respect Welsh literature was for most of the time and how marginal was the role allotted to most writers. The Eisteddfod, with its huge audience, offered both glory and economic reward. It is perfectly natural, given the circumstances, that the accolade 'National Winner' should be surrounded with so much hype and sought after so frantically."

Perhaps for these reasons, during the late 19th century, according to Edwards, "Wales still pursued 'the one poem' that alone, the Renaissance had taught, justified a literature's claim to greatness."

The Welsh poet Lewis William Lewis (1831–1901), whose bardic name was Llew Llwyfo, repeatedly attempted in his eisteddfod submissions to, "achieve the national epic that would merit translation into the major literatures". He chose subjects such as Caractacus, the Arthurian legend, Llewellyn the Last, and even the Old Testament King David. Although Edwards is very critical of Llew Llwyfo and accuses him of following the then common practice of imitating Victorian-era English poetry, Lewis's poetry repeatedly won first prize at multiple eisteddfodau held both in Wales and within Welsh-American immigrant communities.

Tragically, however, "a Welsh epic refused to materialize. A succession of aspirants rifled the works of authorities from Homer to Bulwer-Lytton in the hope of hitting upon a formula that would take."

According to Jan Morris, "By the end of the century, Hubert Herkomer, one of the most fashionable painters of his day, had created for [the Gorsedd]'s functionaries gloriously neo-Druidical robes and insignia of gold, velvet, and ermine (the Archdruid's breastplate was designed to choke him, Herkomer said, if he gave a false judgement)."

=== 1901–1920 ===
Even though the title had been previously chosen by the eisteddfod judges, almost certainly in the hope of inspiring a Welsh equivalent to Lord Tennyson's Idylls of the King, Thomas Gwynn Jones's hugely influential awdl, Ymadawiad Arthur ('the passing of Arthur') won its author the bardic chair at the National Eisteddfod in 1902.

The poem, according to Hywel Teifi Edwards, "brought back some of the mythopoeic grandeur which John Morris-Jones yearned for."

In 1905, Thomas Marchant Williams was knighted by King Edward VII for his part in the revival of the Cymmrodorion Society and the establishment of the National Eisteddfod Association.

One of the most dramatic events in the 900-year history of the eisteddfod took place on 6 September 1917, during World War I. It was the award of the bardic chair during the second day of the 1917 National Eisteddfod of Wales at Birkenhead Park in the English town of the same name. The three adjudicators in the chair competition agreed unanimously that the best awdl by far on the set theme Yr Arwr ('the hero') had been submitted under the pseudonym Fleur-de-lis. The bard was then summoned three times by the Archdruid Dyfed to stand up, in vain. The Archdruid then announced that the poet who submitted the winning awdl had died during the short time between mailing his submission and the date of the eisteddfod. His name was Private Ellis Humphrey Evans, whose bardic name was Hedd Wyn ('blessed peace'), of the 15th Battalion, Royal Welch Fusiliers, and he had fallen during the trench warfare, "somewhere in France". The bardic chair was covered with a black sheet and, according to newspaper reports, "there wasn't a dry eye in the pavilion." Ever since, the 1917 National Eisteddfod of Wales has been referred to as "Eisteddfod y Gadair Ddu" ('the eisteddfod of the black chair').

=== 1921–1960 ===
In the 1921 National Eisteddfod at Caernarfon, Reverend Albert Evans-Jones (Cynan) won the bardic crown for his pryddest, Mab y Bwthyn ('the cottage lad'). Cynan was a native of Pwllheli and had served in the RAMC during World War I. Cynan drew for his winning pryddest upon both the poetry of John Masefield and upon his own experiences in the Macedonian front and in the trenches of France. Mab y Bwthyn "tells, in a gushingly romantic, lyrical style how a young gwerinwr, scarred by the horrors of war, turns from the fetid city to seek spiritual renewal in the natural beauty of his home and the love of a pure country girl." Cynan's poem has been called the best-loved pryddest ever composed during the 20th century and many Welsh people, according to Hywel Teifi Edwards, are still able to recite long passages of it from memory. Alan Llwyd, who has translated part of Mab y Bwthyn into English for the 2008 book Out of the Fire of Hell: Welsh Experience of the Great War 1914–1918 in Prose and Verse, has argued that Cynan, rather than the far more famous Hedd Wyn, is the greatest Welsh war poet.

At the 1936 National Eisteddfod held at Fishguard, the set title for the Bardic Crown was Yr Anialwch ('the wasteland'), which was almost certainly inspired by T.S. Eliot's famous Modernist poem of the same name. Instead of copying Eliot, however, Welsh poet David Jones (of the bardic name, Dwst y Garreg, transl. 'the desert', or lit., 'stone dust') of Cilfynydd won the Crown with a pryddest about black lung disease and the damage it was wreaking upon the coal-mining communities in the South Wales valleys.

Reverend Albert Evans-Jones (Cynan) served a term as the Recorder of Gorsedd Cymru in 1935, and another as joint-secretary of the National Eisteddfod Council in 1937.

According to Hywel Teifi Edwards, "The Second World War, which plumbed new depths of bestiality culminating in the atomic bomb, put the fear of national extinction in a world-wide context. The Welsh, fighting a long battle for cultural survival, found themselves subsumed, as it were, in a universal army. The cry that went up after Nagasaki and Hiroshima, We are all survivors now!, was easily understood by Welsh writers. At that point, the age-old fight to perpetuate a culture steeped in the Christian tradition was more clearly discerned as the crazy militarism of the superpowers moved the world ever nearer to the abyss. The loss of Welshness now, far from being a sign of progress, would merely conduce to the spread of the uniformity of mind so beloved of totalitarians everywhere. Such a conviction has served to intensify the fight for the language, for to lose would be to ease the path of those forces that threaten the whole of mankind."

=== 1961–2000 ===
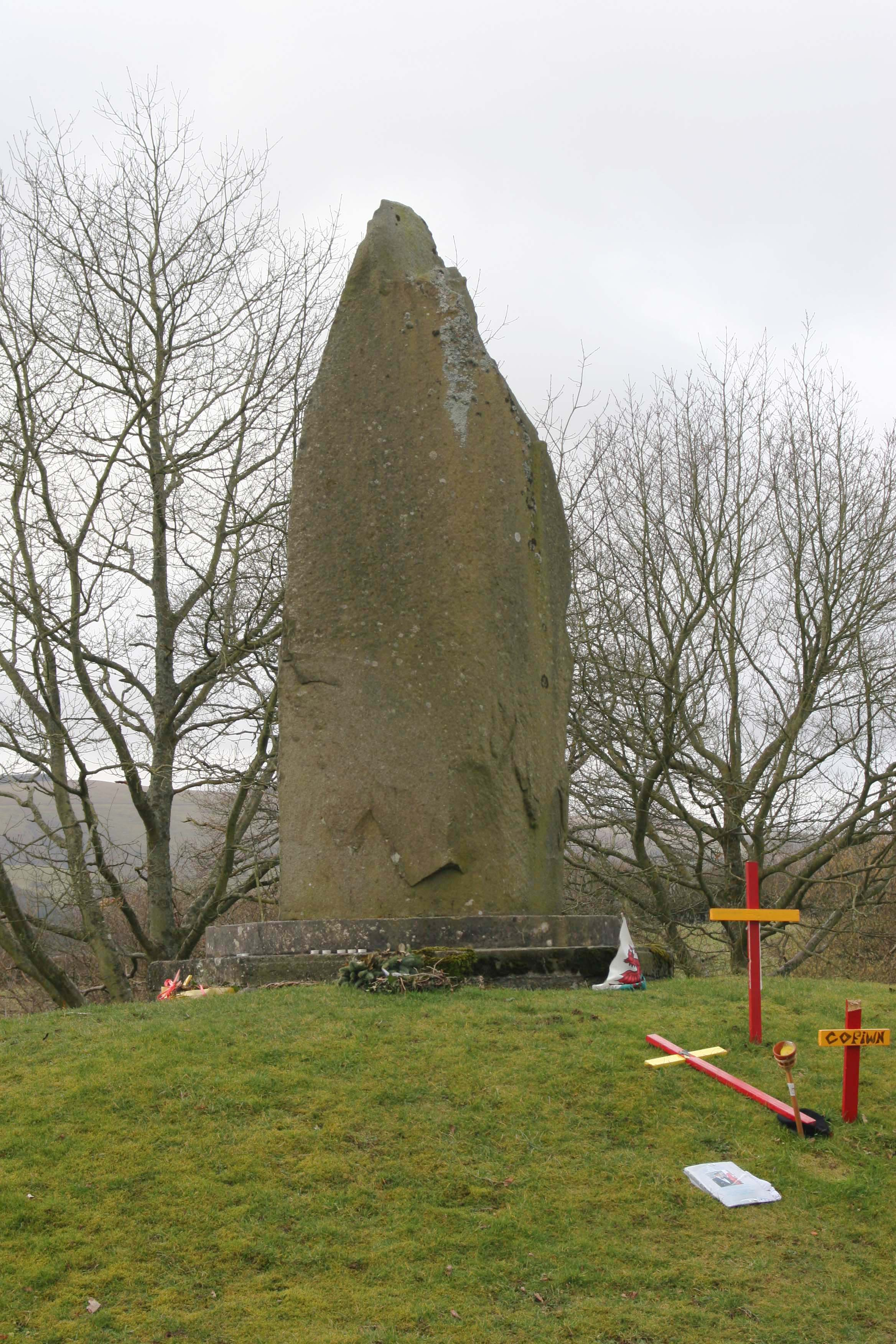
The Llywelyn Monument at Cilmeri

In response to the 1961 census, which showed a radical decrease in the percentage of Welsh speakers, Saunders Lewis gave a 1962 radio address Tynged yr iaith (the fate of the language) in which he predicted the imminent extinction of the Welsh language unless immediate action was taken. Lewis hoped to motivate Plaid Cymru into directly fighting for the language. Instead, his address led to the 1962 foundation of Cymdeithas yr Iaith Gymraeg ('the Welsh language society') at a Plaid Cymru summer school held in Pontardawe in Glamorgan.

In 1985, the long-term effects of Saunders Lewis's Tynged yr Iaith were listed by Gwyn Williams: the formation of Cymdeithas yr Iaith Gymraeg in 1962, direct action against English-language offices, roadsigns, and TV masts, sit-ins and demonstrations, Welsh-language schools, the 1973 adoption of adult education in the Welsh language based upon the Ulpan system created in the State of Israel for teaching the Hebrew language and Israeli culture to adult immigrants, the 1964 creation of the office of Secretary of State for Wales, the 1967 passing of the Welsh Language Act, the creation of S4C, and the mushrooming of Welsh-language publishing, film production, pop and rock, as well as youth and urban music.

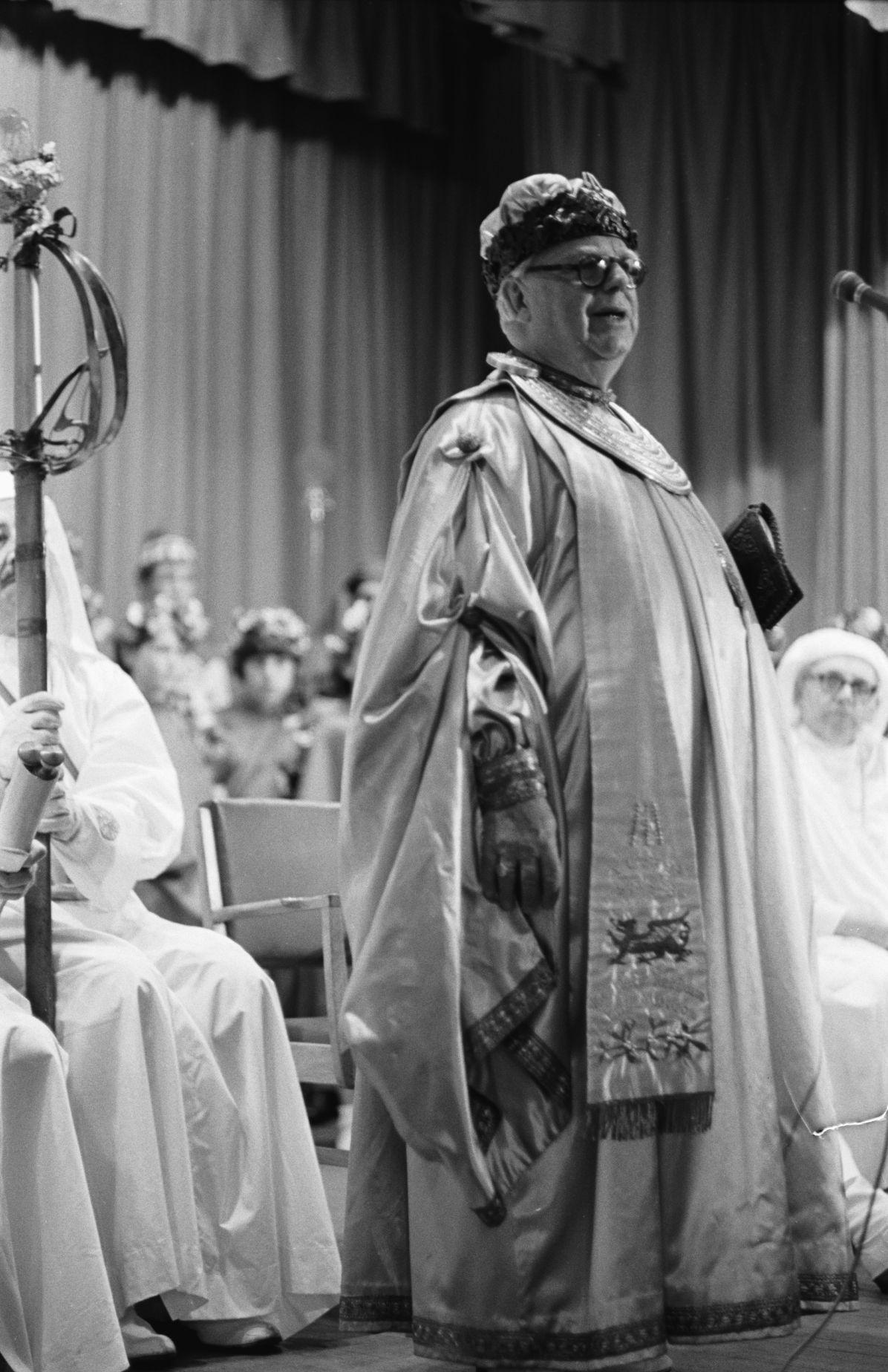
Albert Evans-Jones as Archdruid

Reverend Albert Evans-Jones (Cynan) served as Archdruid twice and is the only person ever to have been elected to that position for a second term. His two terms were from 1950 to 1954 and from 1963 to 1966. He was also the first Archdruid to accept that the Gorsedd is an 18th-century invention by Iolo Morganwg and that it has no links to Welsh mythology or to the ancient Druids, thus healing rifts between the academic and ecclesiastical establishments and the eisteddfod movement.

Cynan is also responsible for designing the modern ceremonies of the crowning and chairing of the bard in the eisteddfod as they are now performed, by creating ceremonies which, he thought, better reflected the Christian beliefs of the Welsh people.

In 1969, Cynan was knighted by Queen Elizabeth II as part of the honours at the Investiture of the Prince of Wales for Cynan's services to both Welsh culture and literature. He remains the only Archdruid ever to have been so honoured.

Although it has been held since 1929, the most notable event in the history of the Welsh youth festival known as the Urdd National Eisteddfod took place at Aberystwyth, also in 1969. Charles, Prince of Wales was invited, so giving him a public platform from which to address the crowd. It was the same year as his investiture as Prince of Wales, which had outraged many Welsh nationalists, particularly those with leanings towards republicanism. For this reason, as the Prince arrived on stage, more than one hundred people stood up and walked out in protest. The fallout afterwards was heated and an editorial in the Welsh-language newspaper Y Cymro severely angered the director of the Urdd National Eisteddfod.

In a parallel with the simultaneous literary movement known as New Formalism in American poetry, the late 20th century witnessed a renaissance in Welsh poetry composed in strict meter, especially englynion and cywyddau. This renaissance is largely inspired by the poetry of Alan Llwyd. Llwyd, a native of Dolgellau, Gwynedd, first came to prominence with the almost unheard of feat of winning both the chair and the crown at the 1973 National Eisteddfod and then repeating the same feat in 1976.

The 1982 bardic chair was awarded to Gerallt Lloyd Owen for the awdl Cilmeri, which Hywel Teifi Edwards has called the only 20th-century awdl, that matches T. Gwynn Jones's 1902 masterpiece Umadawiad Arthur ('the passing of Arthur').

In 1999 the centenary of early Gaelic revival poet and Easter Rising leader Patrick Pearse's initiation into the Gorsedd at the 1899 Pan Celtic Eisteddfod in Cardiff (where he took the Bardic name of Areithiwr) was marked by the unveiling of a plaque at the Consulate General of the Irish Republic in Wales.

=== 21st century ===
In a ceremony held entirely in the Welsh language during the 2002 National Eisteddfod at St. David's, Rowan Williams, the Anglican Archbishop of Wales, was sworn into the Gorsedd as a "White Druid" under the bardic name "Ap Aneurin".

According to Marcus Tanner, "The hour-long ritual, which took place at dawn inside a circle of improvised standing stones, seemed culled from the pages of Tolkien's The Lord of the Rings, not least because the more intrusive signs of modern technology, such as loudspeakers, had been concealed beneath wreaths of foliage. After a fanfare of trumpets and the playing of a harp, the Archbishop, dressed in white, laid his hands on a huge sword before being escorted into the heart of the stone circle to meet the horn of plenty. For all its appeal to antiquity, the rite that the company followed was one Iolo Morganwg would have recognized, since he invented it."

In response to sharp criticisms of Archbishop Williams by the English-language media and other Christian clergy, "for having taken part in a Pagan ritual", the Archdruid Robyn Lewis said, "Iolo did create his Gorsedd while fantasizing about Pre-Christian times, but as it developed it rapidly became a mainstream Christian organization."

== Current eisteddfodau ==
=== Eisteddfodau in Wales ===
==== National Eisteddfod ====
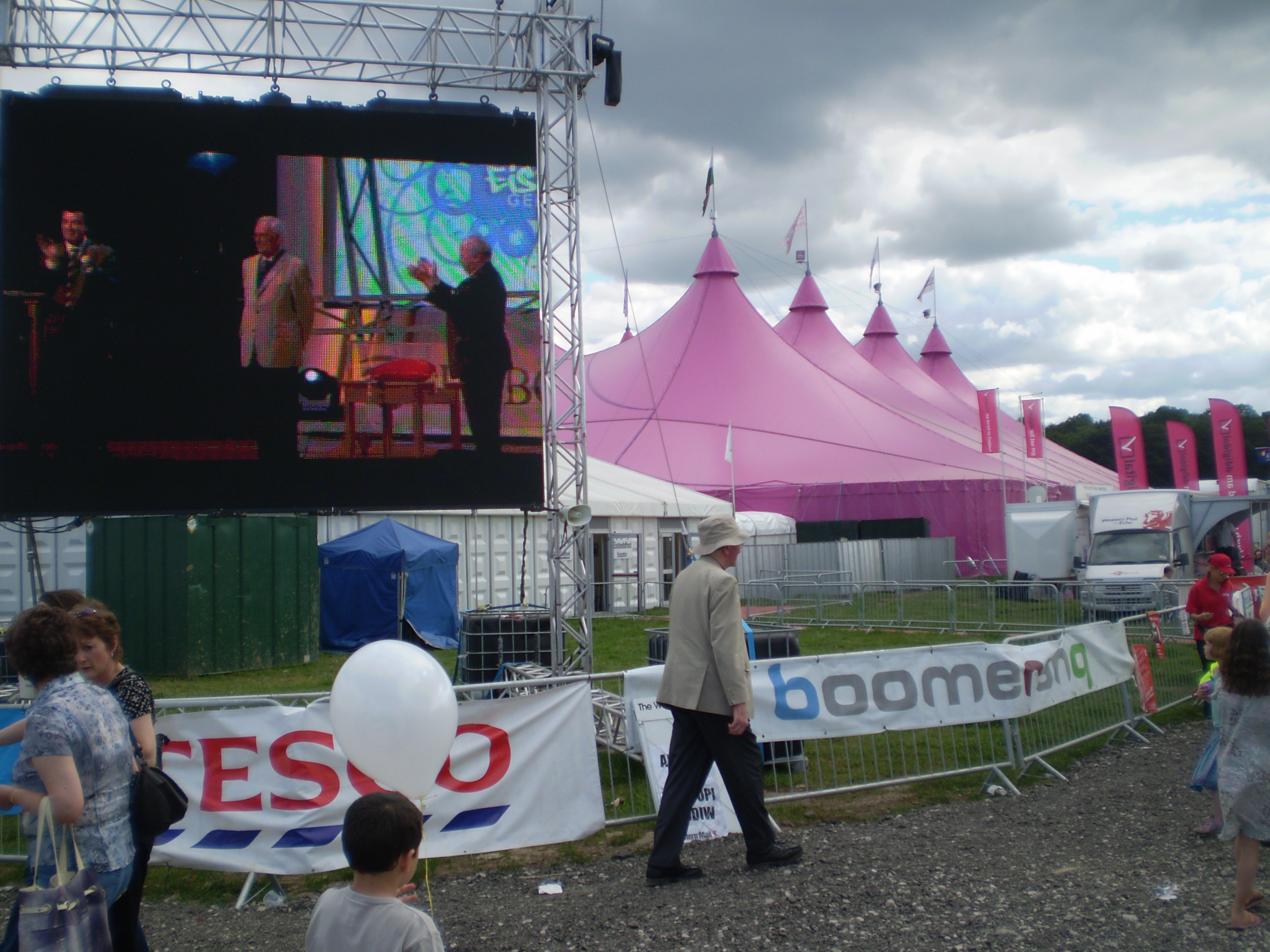
The National Eisteddfod of Wales, Mold 2007

The most important is the National Eisteddfod of Wales, the largest festival of competitive music and poetry in Europe. Its eight days of competitions and performances, entirely in the Welsh language, are staged annually in the first week of August in varying locations that usually alternate between north and south Wales. Competitors typically number 6,000 or more; overall attendances generally exceed 150,000 visitors.

==== Urdd National Eisteddfod ====
Another important eisteddfod in the calendar is Eisteddfod Yr Urdd or the 'Youth Eisteddfod'. Organised by Urdd Gobaith Cymru, it involves young Welsh people from nursery age to 25 in a week of competition in singing, recitation, dancing, acting and musicianship during the summer half-term school holiday. The event is claimed to be Europe's premier youth arts festival. Regional heats are held in advance and, as with the National Eisteddfod, the Urdd Eisteddfod is held in a different location each year. With the establishment of the Urdd headquarters in the Wales Millennium Centre, the eisteddfod will return to Cardiff every four years.

==== The International Eisteddfod ====
The International Eisteddfod is held annually in Llangollen, Denbighshire, each year in July. Choirs, singing groups, folk dancers and other groups attend from all over the world, sharing their national folk traditions in one of the world's great festivals of the arts. It was set up in 1947 and begins with a message of peace. In 2004, it was (unsuccessfully) nominated for the Nobel Peace Prize by Terry Waite, who has been actively involved with the eisteddfod.

==== Other eisteddfodau in Wales ====
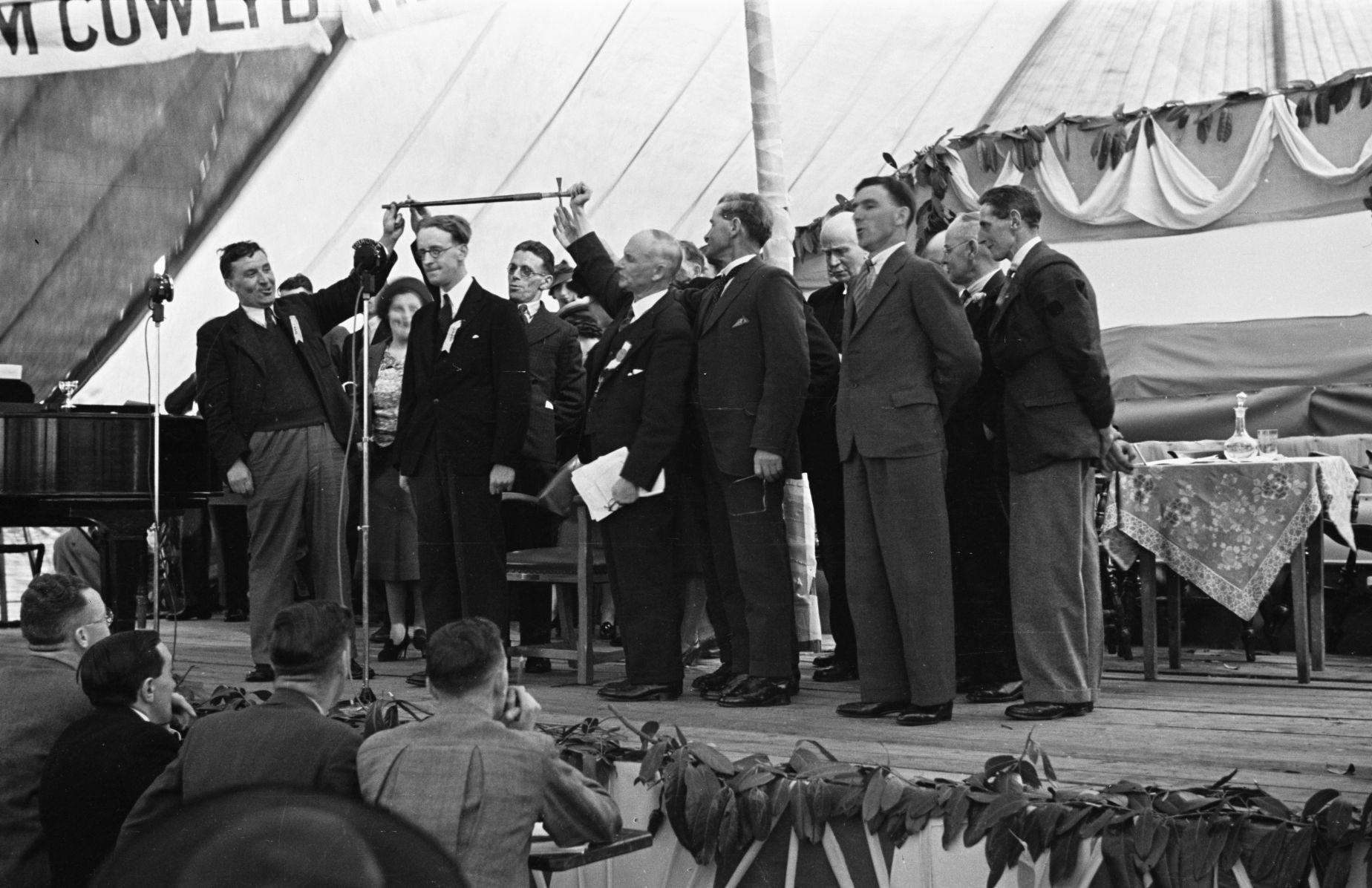
1939 Dyffryn Conwy Eisteddfod

Smaller-scale local eisteddfodau are held throughout Wales. Schools hold eisteddfodau as competitions within the school; a popular date for this is Saint David's Day.

Gŵyl Fawr Aberteifi (originally called Eisteddfod Aberteifi) has taken place in the town of Cardigan since the end of the 19th-century.

Eisteddfod Môn has been held on Anglesey since 1907, held each year at a different location on the island, but often at the county town of Llangefni. In 2025 it was held during a May weekend in Beaumaris.

Eisteddfod Dyffryn Conwy has been held annually on the third Saturday of June, since 1927. Often held in Llanrwst under a temporary tent, it moved to Ysgol Dyffryn Conwy in 1980.

Eisteddfod Dyffryn Ogwen has been held since the end of World War II, later moving to be held at Ysgol Dyffryn Ogwen in Bethesda.

The Maes Garmon Eisteddfod (Welsh: Eisteddfod Ysgol Maes Garmon, Yr Wyddgrug) is held in Mold, Flintshire.

Eisteddfod Caerdydd, held at Ysgol Gyfun Gymraeg Plasmawr in Cardiff, was first held in January 2020.

== Eisteddfodau outside Wales ==
Welsh emigration, particularly during the heyday of the British Empire and British industrial revolution, led to the creation of a global Welsh diaspora. Among the elements from Welsh culture that travelled with these émigrés was the eisteddfod, which – in a variety of forms and languages – continues to exist worldwide.

=== Argentina ===
According to Marcus Tanner, the 19th-century Welsh immigration to Y Wladfa ('the colony'), in the Chubut Province of Argentine Patagonia began out of the desire of minister and Welsh nationalist Michael D. Jones for "a Little Wales beyond Wales". As both cultural assimilation and language loss were already taking hold among the Welsh diaspora throughout the United States and even more so in Canada and other parts of the British Empire, Patagonia was chosen as an alternative.

Although eisteddfodau have been held in Argentina ever since the first Welsh immigrants arrived aboard the Mimosa in 1865, assimilation and the loss of contact with the homeland caused both the distinctive Patagonian dialect of the Welsh language and the eisteddfod tradition to be seriously endangered.

In 1965, Welsh people again began to visit the region to celebrate the colony's centenary. The visit acted as a major impetus to the increasingly assimilated local Welsh Argentine community and since then the number of Welsh visitors and learners of the language has increased.

Bruce Chatwin visited Gaiman in 1976, which he called "the centre of Welsh Patagonia today". While at Ty-Ysaf, the homestead of the Davies family, he was told how the family's son, Euan Davies, had sung at the local eisteddfod while accompanied by Anselmo, a local aspiring concert pianist of mixed German and Italian parentage. Davies's tenor voice and Anselmo's piano playing reportedly reduced the audience at the eisteddfod to tears and "carried off the prize."

Marcus Tanner has written since of Chatwin's travel memoir In Patagonia, "After several decades during which the Welsh colony in Argentina had been virtually forgotten, his book did much to remind the world of its existence." According to Eluned Gonzalez, however, a local Welsh Argentine who remembers the real Chatwin and his visit, "We are all very surprised by the book... so superior. Looking down on us... a very English way of looking at things."

During the British government's repatriation of the 11,313 Argentine POWs taken during the 1982 Falklands War, Welsh-speaking British merchant seamen and British soldiers from the Welsh Guards were shocked to find themselves addressed in Patagonian Welsh by an Argentine POW who was on the way home to Puerto Madryn. Over the years since, close ties between Wales and Y Wladfa have been reestablished.

One of the greatest Welsh literary figures to come out of Y Wladfa was Richard Bryn Williams, whose bardic name was Bryn. He was born at Blaenau Ffestiniog, migrated to Y Wladfa with his parents as a child, then returned to Wales in 1923. He won the Bardic Chair at the National Eisteddfod of Wales in both 1964 and 1968, and from 1975 to 1978 he served as Archdruid of Gorsedd Cymru.

A 2001 BBC article described in detail the recent visit to Chubut Province by Archdruid Meirion Evans and 30 members of Gorsedd Cymru to revive the Gorsedd yr Wladfa in a ceremony held in a specially constructed stone circle near Gaiman.

BBC reporters also attended the 2001 Eisteddfod del Chubut at Trelew and watched as the bardic chair was awarded for the first time in Y Wladfa to a female poet: Gaiman hotel owner Monica Jones de Jones, for an awdl on the subject of rhyddid ('freedom'). The article's author continued, "the Patagonia Eisteddfod itself, while sharing those elements common to eisteddfodau in Wales itself, nonetheless is, in other respects, quite a different affair. As well as haunting Welsh folk tunes, and recitations in the unique Spanish-accented Welsh of the Patagonians, there are also rousing displays of Argentinian folk dancing which owe everything to the culture of the gauchos and nothing to the somewhat tamer dance routines of the Welsh homeland."

Current eisteddfod competitions are bilingual, in both Patagonian Welsh and Argentine Spanish, and include poetry, prose, literary translations (Welsh, Spanish, English, and French), musical performances, arts, folk dances, photography, and filmmaking, among others. The Eisteddfod del Juventud is held every September at Gaiman. The main Eisteddfod del Chubut is held every October at Trelew. Other annual eisteddfodau are held at Trevelin, in the Andes and at Puerto Madryn along the South Atlantic coast.

=== Australia ===
==== Early eisteddfodau ====
Joseph Jenkins (known by his Bardic name, Amnon II) was a key figure in early Australian eisteddfodau, winning best englyn on thirteen consecutive occasions at the Ballarat Eisteddfod

Australian eisteddfodau are a part of Australian culture and the word "eisteddfod" is thoroughly naturalised in Australian English, being listed in the Macquarie Dictionary. The first Welsh eisteddfodau in Australia took place at Ballarat, Victoria in 1855, featuring competitions in many disciplines. While the event brought amateur practitioners together and gave them a chance to perform publicly, enhancing their crafts and meet potential patrons, it is perhaps most notable as the first competitive musical competition to be held in the country. The most celebrated competitor at the early Ballarat Eisteddfodau was Joseph Jenkins (known by his bardic name Amnon II). According to his memoir The Diary of a Welsh Swagman, Jenkins was living in Castlemaine at the tail end of the Victorian gold rush. Just one month after emigrating from Tregaron, Ceredigion in 1869, he had found many fellow Welsh-Australians and rarely left his new locality except to attend the annual St David's Day eisteddfod at Ballarat. Jenkins' poetry was very successful at the competition, winning first prize for the best englyn on thirteen consecutive occasions.

The successor to the St. David's Day Eisteddfod in Ballarat, the Royal South Street Eisteddfod, began in 1891 and has been held ever since. The second-oldest eisteddfod in Australia is held in Wollongong, the City of Wollongong Eisteddfod, which began in 1894 and has been running ever since.

==== Tasmania ====
Tasmania was also home to a number of early eisteddfodau, with the first held at Launceston in 1902, with the event being said to have drawn a good response from both audiences and performers. The Devonport Eisteddfod was first held in 1921 and, with the exception of a wartime recess has been held annually ever since. The 1967 Devonport competition saw the establishment of the Australian Rosny Children's Choir, which earned international recognition after winning both local and national eisteddfodau. In 1971 the choir became the first from the Southern Hemisphere to participate in the prestigious Llangollen International Musical Eisteddfod in Wales, being performing across the United Kingdom. Other Tasmanian eisteddfodau include The Hobart City Eisteddfod (annually since 1951), the Clarence Eisteddfod has (since 1962) and the Burnie Eisteddfod (since 1968).

==== Sydney Eisteddfod ====
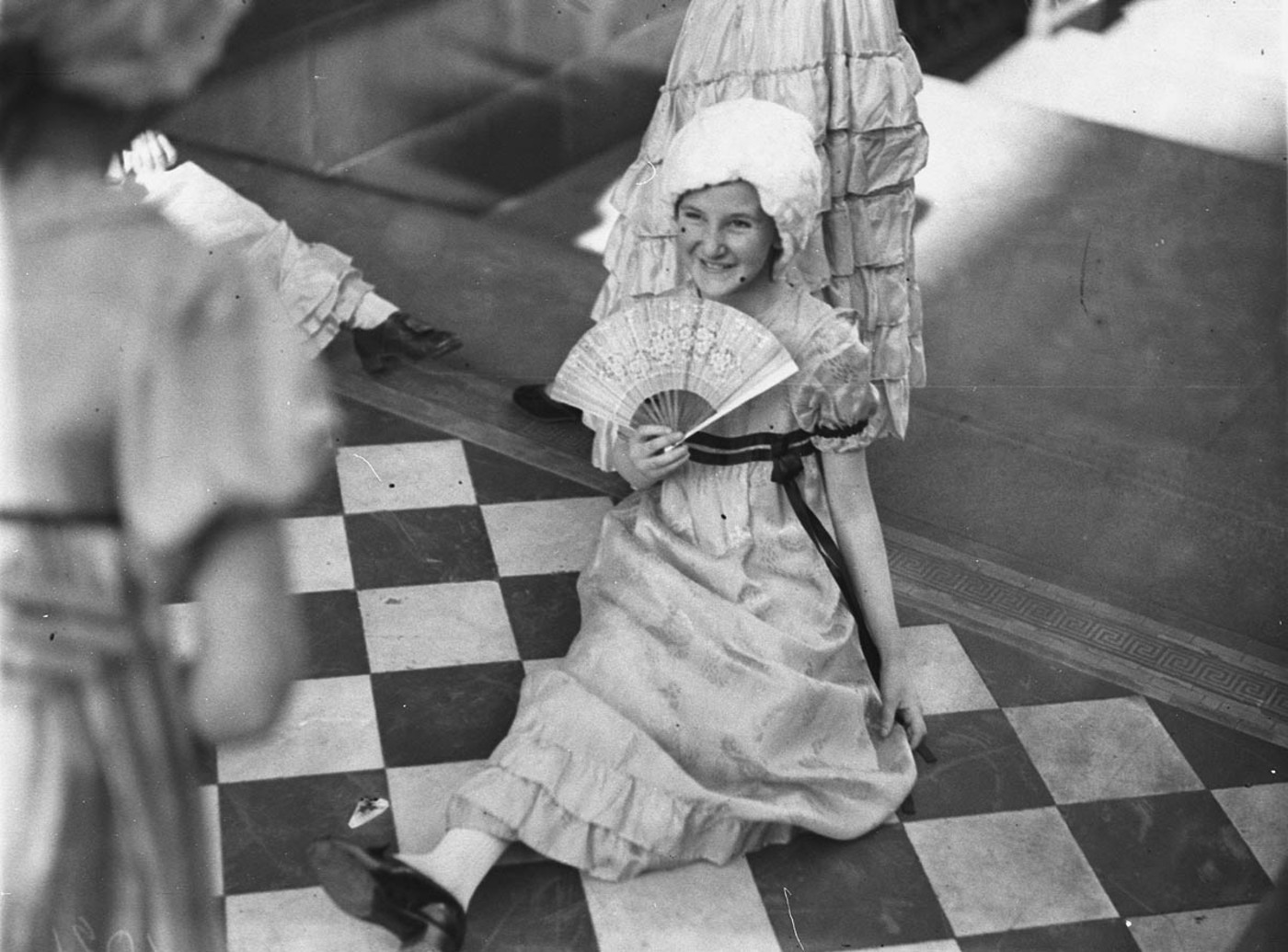
Cystadleuwyr at the State Library of New South Wales during the 1929 City of Sydney Eisteddfod

While eisteddfodau had been held across Sydney for decades, plans to hold a "Great Eisteddfod" in the city were first announced in 1932 and the first competitions were held at Sydney Town Hall in August of the following year.

Competitions were not postponed from 1942 to 1945 due to war. However the event returned with a "Victory Eisteddfod" in 1946, attracting 15,662 cystadleuwyr competing across more than 20 venues. The post-war years saw the annual Sydney Eisteddfod become firmly established as a Sydney cultural institution and today, the Sydney Eisteddfod is one of the largest cultural events in Australia, running annually from May to September and consisting of over 330 events across the city, including the Sydney Opera House and Sydney Conservatorium. The competition attract competitors from across Australia and overseas, with over 2.5 million performers having competed at the events since the first competition was held in 1933.

==== Other Eisteddfodau ====
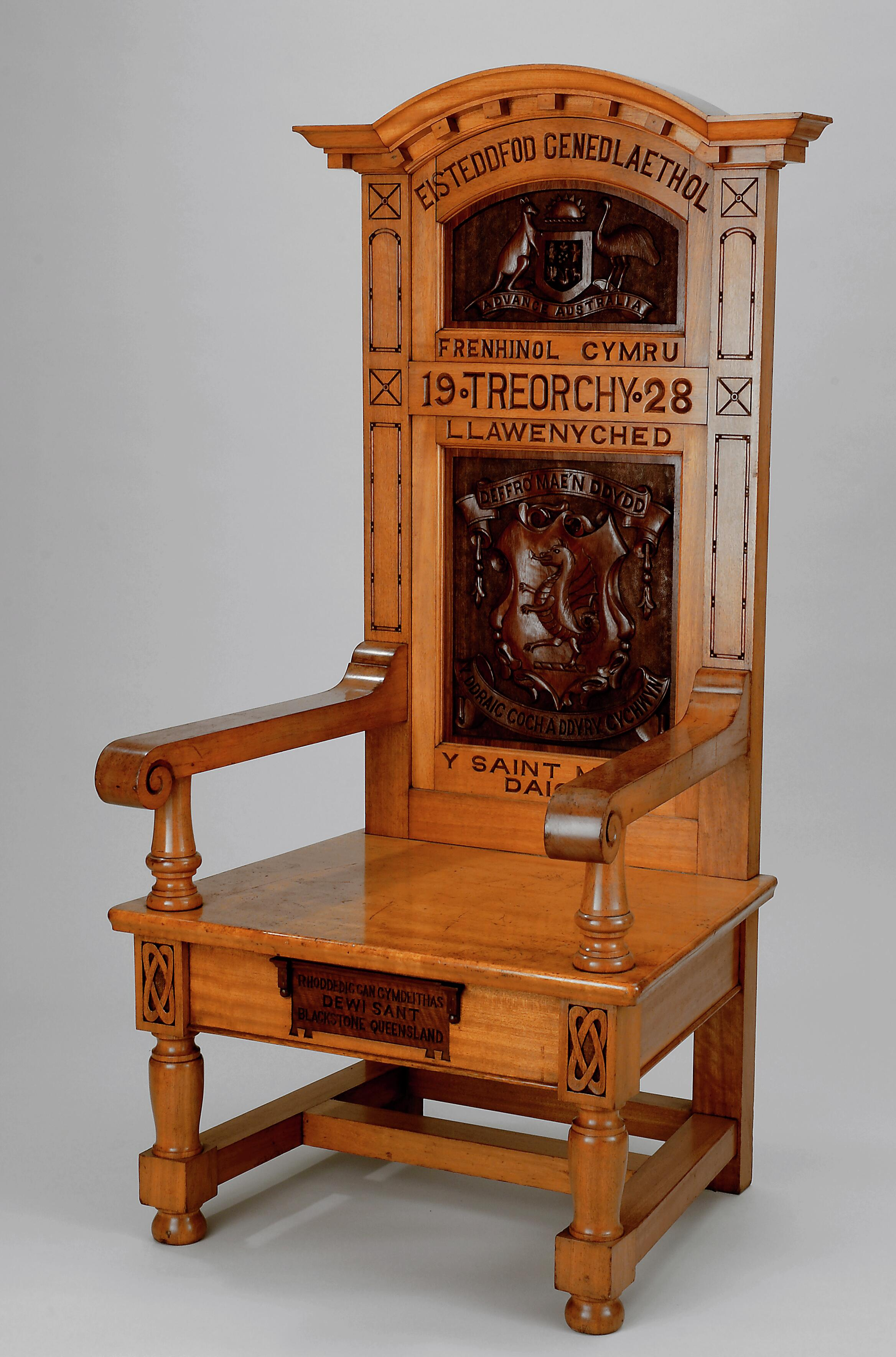
A chair from the 1928 National Eisteddfod of Wales. The back of the chair features the Coat of arms of Australia as it was donated by the Welsh Society of Blackstone, Queensland.

The Australian National Eisteddfod was first held in 1938 and today brings over 4,000 competitors to Canberra for events. The Western Australia Performing Arts Eisteddfod began in 1958 as the Bunbury Music Festival. The Gold Coast Eisteddfod in Queensland began in 1982 and is held annually in August and September. The 2018 eisteddfod attracted over 60,000 competitors. Many other communities also host eisteddfods, including Alice Springs, Darwin, Brisbane, Hobart and Melbourne. The Rock Eisteddfod Challenge which has been held for high-school students has been held since 1984. First promoted as a drug and alcohol prevention vehicle, participation boosts self-esteem and competence, and facilitates bonding at the team, school and community level.

=== Channel Islands ===
The Guernsey Eisteddfod was founded in 1922 and includes events in the Guernésiais language; the Jersey Eisteddfod was founded in 1908 and includes events in Jèrriais dialect of Norman French.

=== England ===
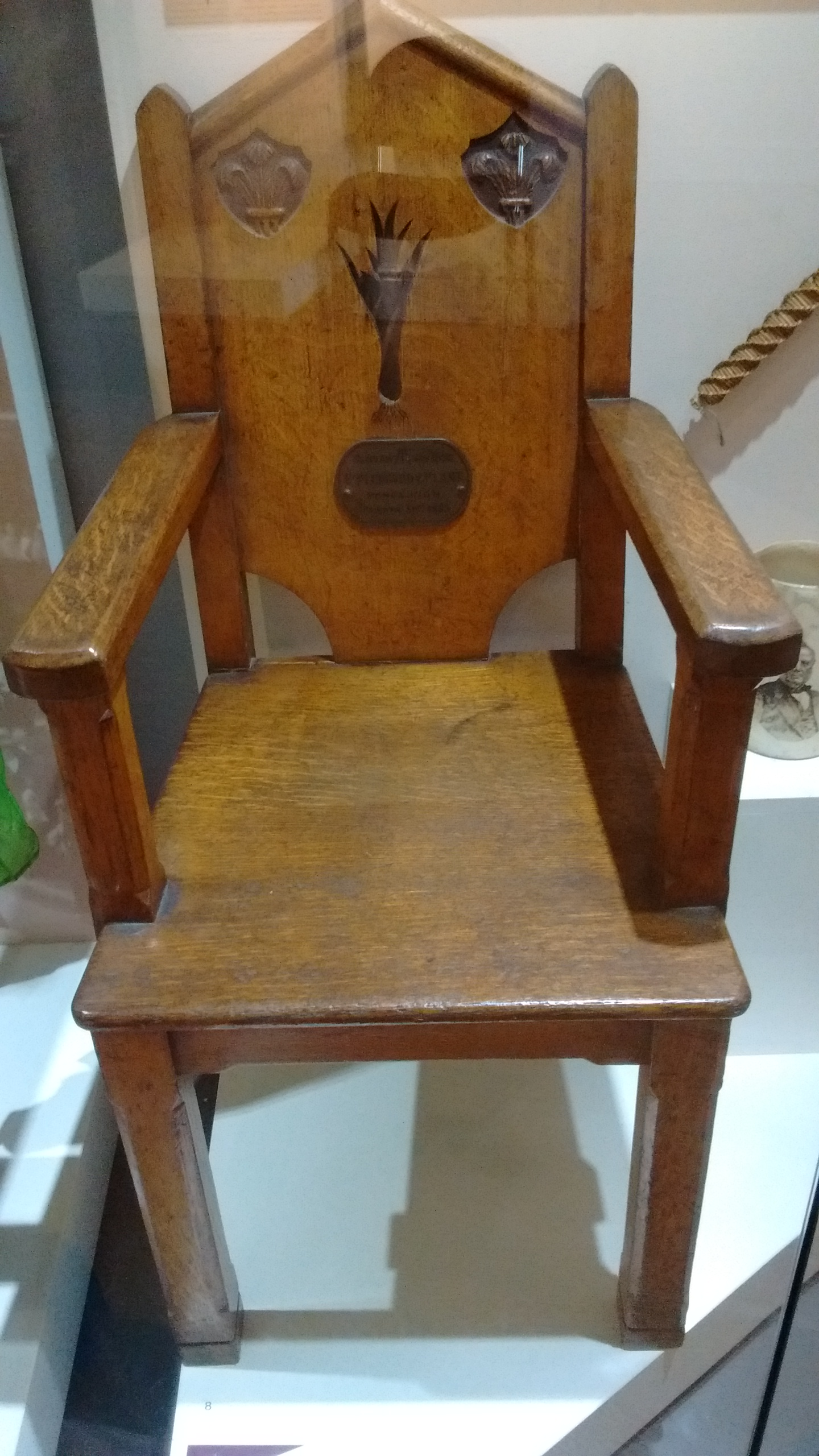
The chair prize from Manchester's 1883 Eisteddfod y Plant ('children's eisteddfod').

Eisteddfodau are held across the UK, although in most cases any explicit link to Welsh culture has been lost beyond the use of the name for an arts festival or competition.

The National Eisteddfod of Wales has been staged several times in England, though the last time this occurred was in Liverpool in 1929.

In 1897 a Forest of Dean Eisteddfod, reportedly a choral competition, was founded at Cinderford.

In the Methodist Church and other nonconformist denominations in England, youth cultural festivals are sometimes called an eisteddfod. The Kettering and District Eisteddfod, for example, was founded in the early 1900s in the Northamptonshire town by members of the Sunday School Union and still runs every March.

The Bristol Festival of Music, Speech and Drama was founded in 1903 as the Bristol Eisteddfod.

The Minsterley Eisteddfod has been held every March in South Shropshire since 1962.

The Teesside International Eisteddfod (Intertie) in Middlesbrough ran from 1966 to 1978.

For many years Teignmouth Grammar School in Teignmouth, Devonshire, held an eisteddfod of art, music and drama competitions in the Easter term.

=== South Africa ===
In South African English, a number of international performing arts competitions in are called eisteddfods, such as the Tygerberg International Eisteddfod and the Pretoria Eisteddfod (first held in 1923). The word eisteddfod is sometimes also used for ordinary cultural festivals, even if only one school's students participate.

In August 1953, the poet Ingrid Jonker, who would go on to become an anti-apartheid political dissident and a hugely influential figure in Afrikaans literature, recited her poems at the Cape Eisteddfod in Cape Town and received there a Diploma for Achievement in Afrikaans.

=== United States ===
Moving first as religious refugees and then as farmers and industrial workers, many thousands of Welsh people emigrated to America from the 17th century.

In 1757, Reverend Goronwy Owen, an Anglican vicar born at Y Dafarn Goch, in the parish of Llanfair Mathafarn Eithaf in Anglesey and the poet most responsible for the subsequent Welsh eighteenth-century renaissance, emigrated to Williamsburg, in the Colony of Virginia. Until his death on his cotton and tobacco plantation near Lawrenceville, Virginia in 1769, Owen was mostly noted as an émigré bard, writing with hiraeth ('longing') for his native Anglesey. During the subsequent revival of the eisteddfod, the Gwyneddigion Society held up the poetry of Owen as an example for bards at future eisteddfodau to emulate.

During the eisteddfod revival of the 1790s, Gwyneddigion Society member William Jones, who had enthusiastically supported the American Revolution and who was arguing for the creation of a National Eisteddfod of Wales, had come to believe that the completely Anglicised Welsh nobility, through rackrenting and their employment of unscrupulous land agents, had forfeited all right to the obedience and respect of their tenants. At the Llanrwst eisteddfod in June 1791, Jones distributed copies of an address, entitled To all Indigenous Cambro-Britons, in which he urged Welsh tenant farmers and craftsmen to pack their bags, emigrate from Wales, and sail for what he called the "Promised Land" in the United States of America.

By 1851, Y Drych ('the mirror'), published from the Welsh-speaking settlement in Utica, New York was just the latest of a number of Welsh-language newspapers, and in 1872 Hanes Cymry America ('a history of the Welsh in America') by R.D. Thomas attempted to catalogue all of the Welsh communities of the United States. Eisteddfodau in North America are thought to have started in the 1830s, though the earliest documented examples date from the 1840s and, especially, the 1850s. Efforts to introduce the Gorsedd into the United States, on the other hand, were less successful and never attracted more than 303 members.

According to Celticist Gethin Matthews, "Next to the chapels, the Eisteddfod was the most potent symbol of Welsh exceptionalism in America. As such, the success of each locality's eisteddfod became a status symbol within the diaspora: something to boast about in the pages of Y Drych, or one of the other periodicals ... There is also a strong link between the eisteddfod tradition and the printed word, with thirty-three publications (from 8 to 464 pages in length) being the fruit of such festivals. Although most of them were published in Utica (which became the hub of the Welsh-American publishing business), they represent the output of eisteddfodau in a wide range of location, including settlements far from the eastern seaboard such as Racine, Denver, and San Francisco."

==== Pennsylvania ====
According to Marcus Tanner, large-scale Welsh immigration to America began in the 1790s, when 50 immigrants left the village of Llanbrynmair for a tract of Pennsylvania land purchased by Baptist minister Morgan John Rhys. The result was the Welsh-American farming settlement of Cambria, Pennsylvania.

By 1913, a sub-gorsedd of North America with a vice-Archdruid, Reverend Thomas Edwards whose bardic name was Cynonfardd, was established at the Pittsburgh Eisteddfod, surviving until 1946.

The Edwardsville Cynonfardd Eisteddfod at the Dr. Edwards Memorial Church in Edwardsville, Pennsylvania has taken place annually since 1889 and is the longest continuously running eisteddfod outside of Wales. The 130th anniversary of the event was celebrated in April 2019.

==== Ohio ====
Welsh-American settlements in Ohio began in 1801, when a group of Welsh-speaking pioneers migrated from Cambria, Pennsylvania to Paddy's Run, which is now the site of Shandon, Ohio.

According to Marcus Tanner, "In Ohio State, Jackson and Gallia counties in particular became a 'Little Wales', where Welsh settlers were sufficiently thick on the ground by the 1830s to justify the establishment of Calvinistic Methodist synods."

As late as 1900, Ohio still had 150 Welsh-speaking church congregations. The Welsh language was commonly spoken there for generations until the 1950s when its use began to subside. As of 2010, more than 126,000 Ohioans are of Welsh descent and about 135 speak the language, with significant concentrations still found in many communities of Ohio such as Oak Hill (13.6%), Madison (12.7%), Franklin (10.5%), Jackson (10.0%), Radnor (9.8%), and Jefferson (9.7%).

The Jackson School Eisteddfod in Jackson, Ohio, is the result of an historically strong Welsh-American business community, who funded the Southern Ohio Eisteddfod Association and a 4,000-seat auditorium that was the only dedicated eisteddfod venue in the United States. In 1930, the hall hosted the Grand National Eisteddfod. While the Great Depression halted the adult events, a youth eisteddfod, founded in 1924, still runs today, with support from the Madog Center for Welsh Studies at University of Rio Grande.

==== Minnesota ====
After the Treaty of Traverse des Sioux was signed by the Dakota people in 1851, Welsh-speaking pioneers from Wisconsin, Upstate New York, and Ohio settled much of what is now Le Sueur and Blue Earth counties in Minnesota. By 1857, the number of Welsh-speakers was so numerous that the Minnesota State Constitution had to be translated into the Welsh language. With such a large number of settlers, it should come as no surprise that eisteddfodau soon followed.

Local Welsh-language poet James Price, whose bardic name was Ap Dewi ('son of David'), was born at Newark, Ohio to parents from Llanon, Ceredigion. After migrating to the Minnesota frontier, ap Dewi served as a deacon and Sunday school teacher at the Horeb Calvinistic Methodist Church in Cambria Township, Blue Earth County and was so dominant at local eisteddfodau that he was considered the "prifardd of Minnesota."

The first Welsh literary society in Minnesota was founded, according to Ap Dewi, at a meeting held in South Bend Township, also in Blue Earth County in the fall of 1855. Also according to ap Dewi, "The first eisteddfod in the state of Minnesota was held in Judson in the house of Wm. C. Williams in 1864. The second eisteddfod was held in Judson in the log chapel in 1866 with the Rev. John Roberts as chairman. Ellis E. Ellis, Robert E. Hughes, H.H. Hughes, Rev. J. Jenkins, and William R. Jones took part in this eisteddfod. The third eisteddfod was held in Judson in the new chapel (Jerusalem) on January 2, 1871. The famous Llew Llwyfo (bardic name) was chairman and a splendid time was had."

According to David M. Jones, a Calvinistic Methodist minister born at Ty Rhedyn, near Marian-glas, Anglesey and Welsh-language writer whose literary talents drew comparisons with Washington Irving, the first eisteddfod held in Cambria Township took place on the Fourth of July, 1871. A "low-lying site behind the house of John Shields" was chosen for the Maes and, as Jones later recalled, "We cut tiers of seats into a natural bank of land and covered the seats with hay. These were the first seats with cushions we had ever seen in Minnesota, and everyone praised them. We built a platform in front of the seats. There was a clear stream running between the platform and the seats. All of us felt that our fine preparations would ensure the success of the program. On the morning of the Fourth, everyone was ready long before the Minnesota sun appeared. In a little while, there were clouds of dust being stirred up by large wagons coming from every direction. The immense prairie was dotted with wagons drawn by horses, mules, and horned oxen. Long before the time, the seats were full."

Ellis Ellis, a Mankato joiner from Aberdyfi, Merionethshire and whose bardic name was Glan Dyfi (after the village of the same name), was, according to Jones, "the adjudicator for the poetry, and it is more than likely that Ap Dewi won the prize. What the subject was, we do not recall, though it is likely that there was a subject. Not often did a Bard compose without a subject. Evan Evans, Daniel Jones, and W.P. Jones must have competed in the essay competition, adjudicated by the cultured David S. Davies. In the humorous address competition, Evan Evans and Henry Hughes were both winners. There were various recitations by Owen Morris and Thomas Hughes, who were masterly as usual, among others. John S. Davies and his group sang several pieces, and the singers of Bethel also took part. Owen Richards and his brother, Tomy Richards, took part in the first eisteddfod. Johnnie Jones from the same district turned out to be skillful at recitation. Before the end of the last meeting one of the Minnesota storms came on, and the audience scattered in a moment."

According to ap Dewi, local eisteddfodau began being held in the county seat of Mankato on 1 January 1873, when one took place at the Blue Earth County Courthouse.

During the same era, a group of Welsh-language poets used to meet regularly under the leadership of Ellis Ellis (Glan Dyfi) at the Cheshire and Jones Shop in Mankato, where the packing paper in the shop was often used to write down englynion in Welsh.

David Jones later expressed a belief that the englynion composed at the Cheshire and Jones Shop were superior to those of far more famous Welsh poets such as Dewi Wyn, Dewi Havhesp, and Dyfed. Jones further recalled, "Glan Dyfi never had any more enjoyment than when tinkering with the elements of englynion, tossing off so many englynion while taking no notice of the rules of Dafydd ab Edmwnd or any other Dafydd. O! To have those old times back again."

Beginning in 1874, eisteddfodau were held annually at the Union Hall in Mankato until 1876, when the custom fell into abeyance until 1890. The 1890 eisteddfod was held on 5 February at the Mankato Opera House, under the leadership of Thomas Hughes and continued there.

By the 1880s between 2,500 and 3,000 people of Welsh background in Minnesota were contributing to the life of some 17 churches and 22 chapels.

The first eisteddfod held in the Twin Cities took place, "on a fairly large scale", and sponsored by the Welsh Calvinistic Methodist chapel on Franklin Avenue in Minneapolis, on 17 January 1885.

A second Minneapolis eisteddfod was held, with the participation of adjudicators and contestants from St. Paul, Minnesota, Lime Springs, Iowa, and Cambria, Wisconsin, on Christmas Day, 1888.

A third Minneapolis eisteddfod was held, under the patronage of the Welsh Calvinistic Methodist chapel and Y Wyddorfa, the Welsh literary society of Minneapolis, on St. David's Day, 1894. Adjudicated contests were held for essays, recitations, poetry, literary translations, and performances.

According to a 2006 article in the Mankato Free Press the custom of local eisteddfodau went into abeyance during the 1950s. An effort was made, however, during the early 21st century, to revive the tradition by the Blue Earth County Historical Society and the Mankato Chapter of the League of Minnesota Poets. During the 2006 Cambria eisteddfod at the Morgan Creek Vineyards in New Ulm, Brainerd poet Doris Stengel was awarded the bardic chair by adjudicator John Calvin Rezmerski.

But, following Rezmerski's death in 2016, the custom of local eisteddfodau again fell into abeyance.

==== American Civil War ====
Competitive eisteddfod were held during the American Civil War, with themes including George Washington, Abraham Lincoln, American patriotism, and Jefferson Davis.

Also during the American Civil War, Edward Thomas, a Welsh-language poet born in Centerville, Ohio to parents from Llanidloes and whose bardic name was Awenydd, was living and working as a schoolmaster at the Welsh-American farming settlement at South Bend Township, in Blue Earth County, Minnesota. In 1862, he enlisted in Company E of the 2nd Minnesota Cavalry Regiment. During his service in that regiment, Thomas wrote many Welsh-language poems, including Pryddest ar Wir Fawredd, which later won the bardic crown at an eisteddfod held in Minersville, Pennsylvania. Following the end of the war, Thomas became a Calvinistic Methodist minister.

==== Illinois ====
Mrs. Jennie A. Ingalls, the daughter of Mr. and Mrs. H.O. Roberts of Minneapolis, won a prize for best recitation at an 1890 eisteddfod held in Chicago, Illinois.

The largest U.S. eisteddfod was held in 1893 at the World Columbian Exposition in Chicago, featuring visiting Welsh choirs invited by the Chicago chapter of the Cymmrodorion Society. The Mormon Tabernacle Choir, which then included a large number of Welsh immigrants, made its first appearance outside of Utah at the same event. At the same eisteddfod, Reverend Evan Reese, a Calvinistic Methodist minister from Puncheston, Pembrokeshire, and Welsh poet whose bardic name was Dyfed, won the bardic chair and the $500 prize money offered for a 2,000 line awdl on the set subject Iesu o Nazareth ('Jesus of Nazareth'). Reese went on to become the Archdruid of Gorsedd Cymru and to announce the posthumous victory of Hedd Wyn at the infamous 1917 Eisteddfod of the Black Chair.

The eisteddfod idea has been retained by some subsequent world's fairs, and has helped to link the Welsh eisteddfod community to its Welsh-American offshoot.

==== California ====
The first Eisteddfod in the State of California was organized by Thomas Gwallter Price, whose Bardic name was "Cuhelyn", and took place in North San Juan on July 4, 1860.

On 28 July 1915, the International Eisteddfod held in San Francisco at the Panama–Pacific International Exposition drew competing choirs from around the nation, including one mixed group composed of the German members of the Metropolitan Opera Chorus from New York City The tightly rehearsed, all-male Orpheus Club of Los Angeles were judged the winner and were awarded $3,000.

In 1926, the Pasadena Playhouse in Pasadena, California, held a competitive eisteddfod of one-act plays by local authors that subsequently evolved into an annual Summer One-Act Play Festival.

In 2011, the West Coast Eisteddfod event was held at the Barnsdall Art Park in Los Angeles, the site of Welsh-American architect Frank Lloyd Wright's Hollyhock House, near Griffith Park, founded by Welsh-American philanthropist Griffith J. Griffith.

From 2012 to 2017, the Los Angeles St. David's Day Festival was the largest Welsh-American cultural event in the United States. It included an eisteddfod, a Celtic marketplace, classes, and a concert. Celebrities of Welsh heritage Henry Thomas, Ioan Gruffudd, Michael Sheen, along with Richard Burton's and Frank Lloyd Wright's families all publicly supported the festival.

==== Oregon ====
The West Coast Eisteddfod (originally the Left Coast Eisteddfod) was founded by Welsh-American social network AmeriCymru and the non-profit Portland, Oregon, Meriwether Lewis Memorial Eisteddfod Foundation in 2009.

==== Welsh Heritage Week ====
Welsh Heritage Week and Cwrs Cymraeg, two ambulatory Welsh language and culture courses held annually, usually in the United States, also each feature a mini-eisteddfod. The North American Festival of Wales held by the Welsh North American Association also includes an eisteddfod.

==== Online ====
In the 21st century the internet and social media helped new eisteddfodau to spring up. For example, AmeriCymru hosts an annual online eisteddfod.

== Similar events in other Celtic cultures ==
Various festivals in other Celtic cultures have similarities to eisteddfodau.

=== Brittany ===
According to Marcus Tanner, even though the Breton people have never faced the dire poverty or mass starvation once commonly risked among Irish language speakers, efforts to preserve the Breton language and its literature have traditionally faced an antagonist with a radically different political ideology than speakers of Celtic languages in the British Isles. Since the 1789 French Revolution and Reign of Terror, mainstream republicanism in France has embraced policies of Secularisation, centralizing government power in Paris, and coercive Francization through the State-controlled educational system.

Despite its long history of hostility to religious practice, Marcus Tanner has written that traditional French republicanism is ironically "a Messianic ideology". In an early 21st century interview with Marcus Tanner, Ronan Le Coadic explained that post-1789 French Governments have successfully sold the French language as, "the language of progress" and have taught minority language speakers that, "All others were the languages of the Church and the nobility. Children were taught that Breton was the language of poverty and the past. Even recently I have interviewed people who recalled their shame at school for knowing Breton."

In contrast, ever since Pope Gregory XI issued the règle d'idiom ('the rule of idiom') in 1373, Roman Catholic clergy were commanded to learn how to preach to and communicate with their flocks in the vernacular. This is also why, ever since the French Revolution, the traditional proverb in the Breton language, Ar brezonek hag ar feiz, A zo breur ha c'hoar e Breiz ('Breton and [the] Faith are brother and sister in Brittany'), was once commonly quoted.

Believers in Breton cultural nationalism have, for these reasons, often been dissidents who criticised or opposed at least some elements of French Republican ideology. This is also why efforts to introduce a form of the eisteddfod into the Breton language revival date from the immediate aftermath of the Revolution.

Even though the neo-bardic, Gorsedd, and Eisteddfod movement in Brittany was founded during the early 19th century by Auguste Brizeux, the real heyday of the movement took place between 1900 and the outbreak of the First World War. Those two decades were dominated by François Jaffrenou, whose bardic name was Taldir, and who introduced many Iolo Morganwg-inspired elements of Welsh culture into Breton culture and literature. During those decades, Taldir founded Gorsedd Barzed Gourenez Breiz Isel ('the Gorsedd of bards of the peninsula of Brittany') and did much to encourage both traditional Celtic poetry and a sense of community among Breton Bards.

In 1936, Morvan Marchal founded the explicitly anti-Christian and neo-Pagan Kredenn Geltiek Hollvedel ('world Celtic creed') group, of which he became the first arch-Druid. The group broke openly from Goursez Vreizh.

Meanwhile, following the Liberation of France, the Government of the newly founded Fourth French Republic launched a propaganda campaign that still continues. It attempted to discredit all activism in favor of Breton cultural and language revival, political devolution, and Breton-medium education by depicting it as synonymous with treason and collaboration with Nazism. This has proven to be far from successful.

Pêr-Jakez Helias, who was both a World War II veteran of the French Resistance and a major figure in Breton literature, later recalled in his memoirs the massive public backlash and roots revival this provoked and his own role in it, "As soon as World War II ended, 'Celtic Clubs' were being founded everywhere in Brittany, but especially in the Breton-speaking regions. The members were young people whose objective was to bring the peasant tradition, with all its costumes, its dances, and its games back into esteem. Within ten years several hundred of these groups had been organized. At the same time, thanks to the persistence of a few pioneers, other young people began to take lessons from the last of the professional bagpipers and oboeists, who were ending their lives in a state of melancholy... Think of thousands of young people involved in traditional art forms at a time when their traditions were both alive and threatened, perhaps even doomed, and faced with a new society which they couldn't count on in any way. How could they possibly not have protested?"

Since 1923, the Festival de Cornouaille (Breton: Cornouaille Kemper) has taken place annually in Quimper, located in the south-west of Brittany. It began as a beauty contest during which one girl was crowned as festival queen, which drew firm objections from the Catholic Church during its post-World War II revival in 1948. The Cornouaille Kemper was accordingly transformed by Pêr-Jakez Helias, François Bégot and Jo Halleguen into an Eisteddfod-inspired summer festival celebrating Breton culture, mythology, literature, and traditional music.

The similar Kan ar Bobl competition, which is held as part of the Festival Interceltique de Lorient, supports the Breton music tradition.

The AberFest in Cornwall alternates with the Breizh – Kernow Festival which is held either in Brandivy or Bignan in Brittany.

=== Cornwall ===
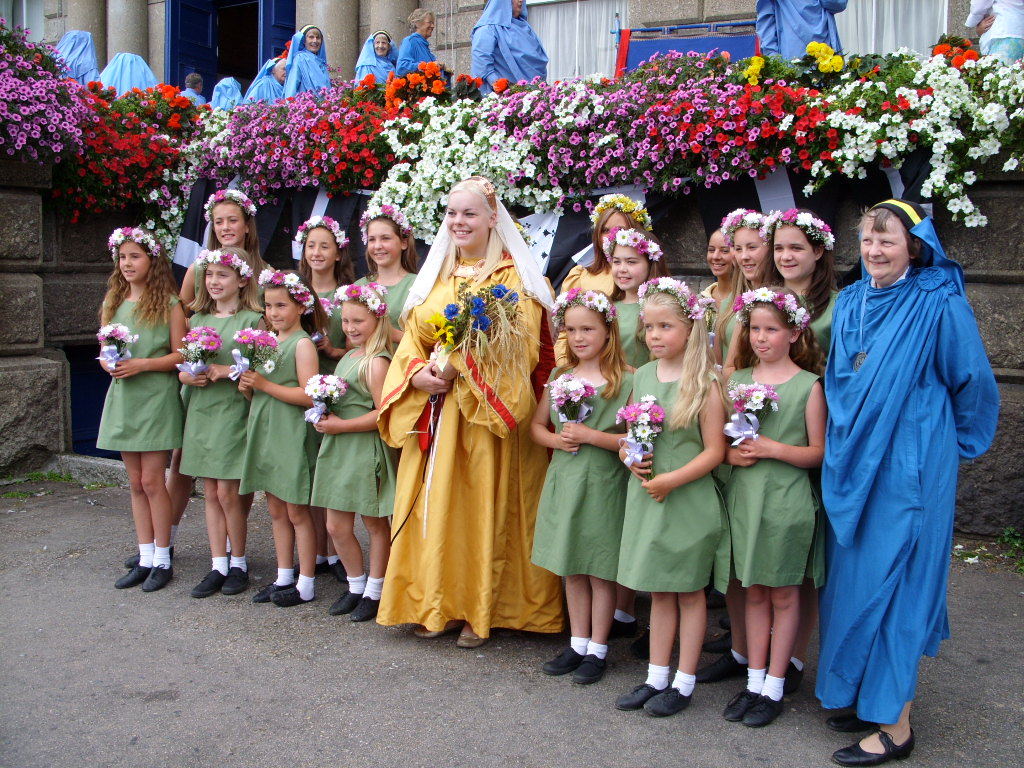
The Lady of Cornwall with her flower girls at the 2007 Esedhvos in Penzance.

In Cornwall, an analogous event is known as Esedhvos Kernow (Cornish for 'Eisteddfod of Cornwall') and is connected, as part of the ongoing Cornish language revival, with Gorsedh Kernow.

AberFest is a festival that celebrates both Cornish and Breton culture and takes place in Cornwall every second year around Easter.

A similar tradition has been created among descendants of the Cornish diaspora in Australia. "Australia's Little Cornwall" is the district of the Yorke Peninsula in South Australia known as the Copper Triangle, which includes the former mining towns of Moonta, Kadina and Wallaroo. In Moonta today, Kernewek Lowender (Cornish for 'Cornish happiness'), which includes an eisteddfod-like gathering of bards, is the largest Cornish festival in the world and attracts more than 40,000 visitors each event. The Cornish language revival has also spread to the Cornish diaspora and is spoken by some enthusiasts in Australia. Senior members of Gorsedh Kernow make frequent visits to Australia, and there are a number of Cornish Australian bards.

=== Ireland ===
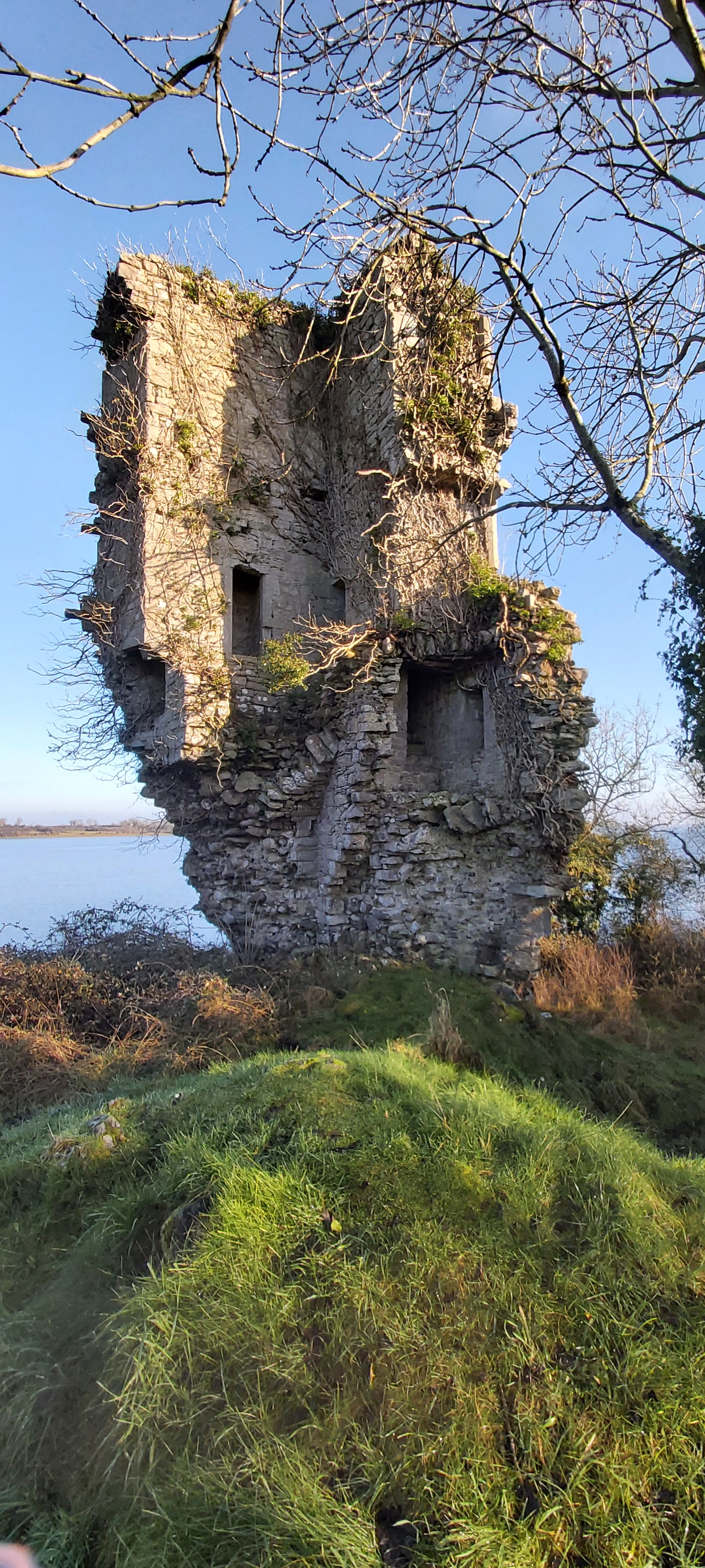
Galey Castle ruin with stairs, doorways and windows visible

During the days of Gaelic Ireland and of the Irish clans, there was a tradition similar to the first eisteddfodau. Irish clan chiefs would host feasts for their clansmen, servants, and warriors which centered around a contest between Irish-language bards, whose poetry was performed by professional singers accompanied by a harp. As in 12th-century Wales, the clan chief always chose the winner with the approval of those assembled. This tradition, which arose during the 14th century, was termed a Gairm Sgoile (Early Modern Irish for 'summoning', or 'gathering', 'of the [Bardic] school').

This title referred to the fact that Irish language bards were trained in the dark at special bardic schools (Irish: Sgoile) based on the principle of memorisation of Irish bardic poetry and stories about the deities of Irish mythology. Irish bards and their students were expected to compose their verses lying down and in the dark, "to avoid the distraction which light and the variety of objects represented commonly occasions" and to concentrate solely, "upon the subject at hand and the theme given".

The most famous gathering of the bardic school took place on Christmas Day, 1351. William Ua Cellaig, Chief of the Name and King of Uí Maine in Connacht, held, like Prince Rhys ap Gruffydd, a great competition and feast for the bards of Ireland. An entire temporary village was erected with separate streets for musicians, seanchaithe, poets, and jugglers.

The traditional Connacht Irish phrase, "Fáilte Uí Cheallaigh" ('an O'Kelly welcome') dates from this event, which was held at Gailey Castle along Lough Ree, near what is now Knockcroghery, County Roscommon. The feast reportedly lasted for a month. It was during this feast that the poet, Gofraidh Fionn Ó Dálaigh, wrote the poem, Filidh Éireann go hAointeach, which remembers the feast.

After the 16th and 17th century dispossession, emigration, and outlawry of the Irish clan chiefs and the loss of their patronage, the teachers and former students of the bardic schools were forced to adapt.

According to Vivian Mercier, "It is not enough to say that the Gaelic-speaking aristocracy were dispossessed of their lands: the poets themselves were landholders, a sort of Noblesse de robe, whose dispossession accompanied or followed that of the Noblesse d'épée. The overthrow of the bardic institution was accompanied by a change in poetic technique which enables one to judge with considerable accuracy whether a given poem belongs to the bardic period or not: syllabic metre (dán díreach) gives way to stress or song metre (amhrán). This change reflects not only the gradual disappearance of the bardic schools but also of the bardic audience; most authorities believe that the stress metres had been common among the common people for a long time before poems in those metres were granted the dignity of being committed to manuscript. If the dispossessed and often starving poet wanted the favour of his new patrons - those who were only less poor than he - he must cater to their tastes."

The bards overwhelmingly adapted, according to Daniel Corkery, by becoming teachers at the hedge schools in Irish villages.

Meanwhile, in 18th-century Munster, the custom arose, in what was both mimicry and satire of the ceremonial of the English-dominated legal and court system, of the local chief-bard presiding over sessions of a cúirt, or poetic court. A cúirt would begin with "bailiffs" delivering often humorously worded "warrants" which summoned local Irish-language poets to a bardic competition presided over by the chief-bard as "judge". In many cases, two poets at the cúirt would engage in flyting (Classical Gaelic: immarbág) (Irish: iomarbháigh) ('counter-boasting'), meaning the trading of insults in verse often improvised on the spot. According to Corkery, much of the serious, improvised, and comic poetry in the Irish language composed for sessions of the Munster poetic courts was written down by the court "recorders" and still survives. At the beginning of his term, the Chief-Poet of a district, similarly to an Irish clan chief, would receive a Staff of Office (Irish: Bata na Bachaille), which would later be handed down to his successor.

Also according to Corkery, the patronage of Bardic and musical contests also continued among the very few remaining families from the Gaelic nobility of Ireland; like the O'Connell family of Derrynane House in County Kerry and the MacDermot Princes of Coolavin in County Sligo, who continued to hold at least a part of their ancestral lands, while ruling over their tenants and servants as the Chief of the Name.

At least for a time, some Anglo-Irish landlords hosted similar contests. During the early 18th century, Irish-language poet, composer, and itinerant harpist Turlough O'Carolan is said to have improvised Carolan's Concerto inside the house of the Anglo-Irish Power family, during such a contest against the Italian violinist Francesco Geminiani. According to other versions of the story, the contest that resulted in the impromptu composition of Carolan's Concerto took place at the home of Church of Ireland clergyman, poet, and satirist Jonathan Swift.

Since it was founded as part of the Gaelic revival by Conradh na Gaeilge in 1897, the eisteddfod-inspired festival known as Oireachtas na Gaeilge was envisaged to spearhead a renaissance of Irish-language literature, culture, and the arts.

In contrast to today's Oireachtas, there was more emphasis on Modern literature in Irish than upon Irish traditional music or the performing arts. There were two competitions for Irish poetry, five for Irish language essays, one for best poetry collection; a competition for unpublished songs or short stories in Irish; a competition for best new song composition, and a recitation competition.

The early organisers of Oireachtas pulled off several major accomplishments, such as the first staging of Robert O'Dwyer's Eithne, the first Irish-language opera, in 1909. Even so, the popularity of Oireachtas waned following the Irish War of Independence and the subsequent Irish Civil War, and the festival was repeatedly cancelled during the 1920s and 1930s.

The festival was traditionally held in Dublin, but, beginning in 1974, Coiste Cearta Síbialta na Gaeilge (Irish for 'Irish language civil rights committee') successfully coerced an end to the practice of never holding Oireachtas in Ireland's Gaeltacht areas.

Oireachtas currently culminates in four major competitions over the weekend: Comórtas na mBan, a sean-nós singing competition for women, Comórtas na bhFear, a similar one for men, and Corn Uí Riada, one for both genders and all ages. There is also Comórtas Damhsa ar an Sean Nós ("Steip"), a Sean-nós dance competition mainly based on the Connemara stepdancing style now popular throughout the country, but also including dancing in other regional styles.

The organisers, under the Directorship of Liam Ó Maolaodha have attempted from the 1990s on to market Oireachtas to millennial Irish speakers via outings, discos, and other youth-oriented events.

Since it was also founded by Conradh na Gaeilge in 1902, Seachtain na Gaeilge (Irish for 'Irish language week'), which is similarly based upon the Welsh eisteddfod, has celebrated Irish traditional music, Gaelic games, and Irish culture.

The festival begins each year on St David's Day and ends on St Patrick's Day, with community-organised events celebrated all over Ireland and the world, such as céilís, concerts, quizzes, competitions and parades. Like the first documented 12th-century eisteddfod, the 14th-century Gairm Sgoile and the 18th-century Munster Cúirt, Seachtain na Gaeilge includes a contest between Irish poets in the Irish language.

Fleadh Cheoil is an annual festival for Irish traditional music that takes place in the same town for a few years in a row, before moving to another area of Ireland in an effort to include all localities in the celebration.

After the end of the Irish War of Independence and the subsequent Civil War, the 1924-1937 revival of the ancient Tailteann Games also emulated the Welsh Eisteddfod by including ceremonies in Pre-Christian Irish clothing and inspired by Irish mythology.

There is also the event known as Imram, which was founded in 2004 by Liam Carson, who had noticed that there was no literary festival dedicated to Irish literature in the Irish language. In response, Carson received funding from Poetry Ireland, Dublin City Council, and Foras na Gaeilge. According to Carson, "The festival name means ‘a voyage of discovery’ and what we’re asking people to do is come with us and discover the Irish language."

=== Isle of Man ===
Unlike in other Celtic nations, the Eisteddfod in the Isle of Man has much less to do with the ongoing revival efforts spearheaded by Brian Stowell, Robert Corteen Carswell, Yn Çheshaght Ghailckagh, and Bunscoill Ghaelgagh, for the island's heritage language of Manx Gaelic, its literature, and its culture. Even so, an Eisteddfod has been held since the Great Depression in Braaid and remains a highly anticipated and widely attended event by the Manx people.

For players and enthusiasts of Gaelic and Manx traditional music and dancing, there is also Shennaghys Jiu ('traditional day') festival. A closer parallel to the Eisteddfod is the annual Cooish festival held since 1996 in Peel, Isle of Man.

=== Scotland ===
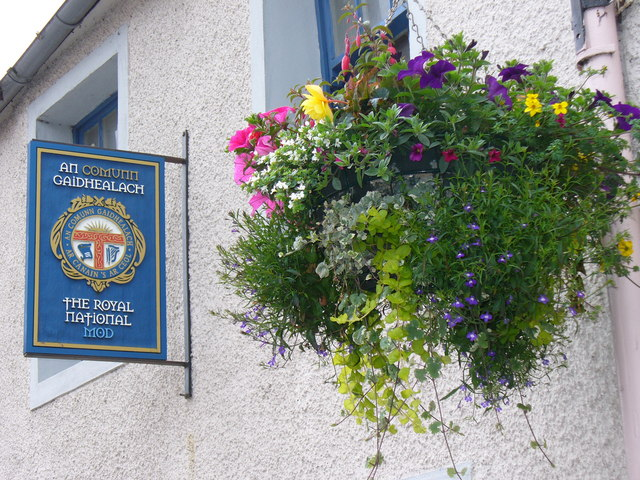
An Comunn Gaidhealach & Royal National Mòd sign and hanging basket outside the main offices along Church Street, Inverness.

The Scottish Gaelic mòd, a festival of Scottish Gaelic song, literature, arts and culture, is modeled upon the Welsh eisteddfod. The mòd, however, is different in that it lacks the 12th-century roots or the fictitious rituals introduced by Iolo Morganwg.

Similarly to the Welsh word eisteddfod, the Gaelic word mòd, which derives from the Old Norse word mót, refers to a Viking Age Thing or a gathering of Scottish clans. In the Highlands and Islands, however, the term originally referred to the Council of the Isles, Scottish clan chiefs who advised Somerled and his successors among as Lords of the Isles. Finlaggan on Islay was the usual site for the gathering of the Council of the Isles.

Similar to the Eisteddfod and other Celtic festivals, the mòd was founded in response to colonialism and in an effort to preserve an increasingly endangered language from the coercive Anglicisation of the educational system.

According to Marcus Tanner, the Society in Scotland for Propagating Christian Knowledge was incorporated under Queen Anne in 1709 and began building both schools and libraries in the Scottish Highlands and Islands with a twofold purpose. The first purpose was to prevent the Gaels from returning to the still illegal and underground Catholic Church in Scotland. The second was to ensure "that in process of time Britons from North to South may speak the same language". For this reason, all schoolmasters were under orders to teach their students only in English and to subject any student who spoke Gaelic inside the school or on the playground to flogging.

Under the 1872 Education Act, school attendance was compulsory and only English was taught or tolerated in the schools of both the Lowlands and the Highlands and Islands. As a result, any student who spoke Scots or Scottish Gaelic in the school or on its grounds could expect what Ronald Black calls the "familiar Scottish experience of being thrashed for speaking [their] native language."

In response, An Comunn Gàidhealach was founded at Oban in 1891 to help preserve the Scottish Gaelic language and its literature and to establish the Royal National Mòd (Am Mòd Nàiseanta Rìoghail), as a festival of Gaelic music, literature, arts, and culture deliberately modelled upon the National Eisteddfod of Wales. The poet, traditional singer, and Highland Land League activist Màiri Mhòr nan Òran (1821–1898), performed in the first Mòd's Gaelic song competition, but she was not awarded a medal.

A mòd largely takes the form of formal competitions. Choral events in Gaelic (both solo and by choirs), and Scottish traditional music including fiddling, bagpipe and folk groups dominate. Spoken word events include children's and adults' poetry reading, storytelling and Bible reading, and categories such as ancient folk tale or humorous monologue. Children can also present an original drama, and there are competitions in written literature.

Unlike the national mòd, local mòds usually only last a day or two. They attract a much smaller crowd and the only notable social event is the winners' ceilidh. As there are fewer competitions than in the national mòd, this ceilidh is often more like a traditional ceilidh with dancing and guest singers between the winners' performances.

According to Ronald Black, "In 1923, following the example of the Welsh Eisteddfod, An Commun Gàidhealach simplified the structure of its annual poetry competitions into a single contest for a Bardic Crown (Scottish Gaelic: Crùn na Bàrdachd), the winner to be acknowledged as Bard of An Commun (Scottish Gaelic: Bàird a' Chomuinn Gàidhealaich) for the coming year. The man behind the move, not surprisingly, was Angus Robertson, then President of An Comunn. Offering a distinctive middle path between traditional and modern verse, the competition produced much work of note which deserves to be put into perspective... (Many subsidiary prizes remained; Sorley Maclean won a junior one in 1928, while in 1946 Derick Thomson won a gold medal as the most distinguished entrant in the literary competitions generally). The Bard was crowned each year at the closing concert of the Mòd. Astonishingly, unlike in Wales, the winning poem itself formed no part of the proceedings... In 1978 no award was made because not entry was of adequate quality. It was the second time in five years that this had happened, and in March 1979 An Comunn announced that the Bardic Crown would no longer be awarded."

There has been some recent criticism of the "Gold Medal" event, which favors the operatic-style Gaelic singing popularized in the early 20th century by Marjory Kennedy-Fraser. Some 21st century Scottish traditional musicians allege that the contest has long marginalised more traditional singers like the late Flora MacNeil and their styles. This is not a new criticism, however, and the poet Allan MacDonald (1859–1905), an iconic figure in Scottish Gaelic literature, once said that the Gaelic songs performed at the Mòd during its inception were, "As though you were to fit a statue into a box by taking off the nose and ears."

More recently, Scottish traditional musician Fergus Munro has also gone on the record, as Scotland has grown increasingly secularised, as a critic of what he alleges is a growing tendency to exclude both Christian poetry and Gaelic psalm- and hymn-singing from the Mòd.

Furthermore, the Mòd is popularly known as the "Whisky Olympics", which is considered, "either a vicious slur or fair comment".

Similarly to the Eisteddfod, since its more recent creation, the Mòd tradition has been introduced to the Scottish diaspora.

In Nova Scotia, where a distinctive form of Gaelic brought by the early Highland settlers preserves the otherwise extinct Lochaber dialect, the Nova Scotia Gaelic Mod attracts visitors from both sides of the Canada–United States border.

In British Columbia, the Gaelic Society of Vancouver held a local mòd biannually from 1990 to 2007.

First held at Alexandria, Virginia in 1988, the U.S. National Mòd is now held annually as part of the Highland games at Ligonier, Pennsylvania and sponsored by An Comunn Gàidhealach Ameireaganach ('the American Scottish Gaelic society').

The 2011 Royal National Mòd, held at Stornoway on the Isle of Lewis, crowned Lewis MacKinnon (Lodaidh MacFhionghain), a poet in the Canadian Gaelic dialect spoken in Antigonish County, Nova Scotia, as the winning bard. It was the first time in the 120-year history of the mòd that a writer of Gaelic poetry from the Scottish diaspora had won the Bardic Crown.

== In popular culture ==
- Jolly Super Too, a selection of journalism by English author Jilly Cooper features a visit to an Eisteddfodd in the early 1970s.
- The 1992 Welsh-language biographical film Hedd Wyn focuses on war poet Ellis Humphrey Evans's (Huw Garmon) pursuit of his lifelong dream of winning the bardic chair at the National Eisteddfod of Wales and on his three-year-long battle against overwhelming pressure to enlist in the British Army during World War I. The bard is depicted as a tragic hero, with a visible disgust for the jingoism, ultranationalism, and Germanophobia that surrounds him. The film's emotional impact is increased when the real Hedd Wyn's love poetry and war poetry are read in voiceover at key moments of the film. The film was directed by Paul Turner and based on a screenplay by chaired and crowned bard Alan Llwyd. It also starred television actor Huw Garmon, who learned the dialect of Welsh spoken in Trawsfynydd during World War I by listening to the oral history tapes at St Fagans National History Museum, in the title role. The film was shot on location in Gwynedd and on a reconstruction of the battlefield at Passchendaele, but also on a shoestring budget of £400,000. However, Hedd Wyn went on to win the Royal Television Society's Television Award for Best Single Drama. It was also the first British motion picture to be nominated for Best Foreign Language Film at the Academy Awards. In 1994, at the newly inaugurated BAFTA Cymru Awards, it won in six categories: Best Director (Paul Turner), Best Design (by Jane Roberts and Martin Morley), Best Drama – Welsh (Shan Davies and Paul Turner), Best Editor (Chris Lawrence), Best Original Music (John E.R. Hardy) and Best Screenwriter – Welsh (Alan Llwyd).
- An early flashback during the 1996 biographical film Shine shows Australian concert pianist David Helfgott (played by Alex Rafalowicz) as a child competing in an eisteddfod held in Adelaide, South Australia during the 1950s.

== See also ==
- List of Celtic festivals
- 2018 Cardiff National Eisteddfod

== Bibliography ==
- Davies, W. Beynon (1970). Thomas Gwynn Jones. Cardiff: University of Wales Press. ISBN 0900768630.
- John Davies (1994b), Broadcasting and the BBC in Wales. University of Wales Press. ISBN 0-7083-1273-X.
- Translated by Martha A. Davies (2015), History of the Welsh in Minnesota, Foreston, and Lime Springs, Iowa, Great Plains Welsh Heritage Project. Wymore, Nebraska.
- Hywel Teifi Edwards (2015), The Eisteddfod, University of Wales Press.
- Edited by William Evans (1977), Diary of a Welsh Swagman Macmillan, Melbourne 1975, reprinted by Sun Books.
- Edited by Thos. E. Hughes, et al. (1895), History of the Welsh in Minnesota, Foreston, and Lime Springs, Iowa: Gathered from the Old Settlers.
- Jones, William Hughes (1912). At the Foot of Eryri: A Book about Poetry in Wales. Bangor: Jarvis & Foster.
- Lewis, Llŷr Gwyn (2019). "Arthurian tradition in modern Welsh literature". In Lloyd-Morgan, Ceridwen; Poppe, Erich (eds.). Arthur in the Celtic Languages: The Arthurian Legend in Celtic Literatures and Traditions. Arthurian Literature in the Middle Ages, 9. Cardiff: University of Wales Press. pp. 245−259. ISBN 9781786833433.
- Morgan, Kenneth O. (2002) [1982]. Wales 1880-1980: rebirth of a nation. History of Wales. Vol. 6. Oxford: Oxford University Press. ISBN 0-19-821760-9.
- Jan Morris (1984), The Matter of Wales: Epic Views of a Small Country, Oxford University Press. ISBN 0195042212
- Marcus Tanner (2004), The Last of the Celts, Yale University Press. ISBN 0300104642
