= Hedd Wyn (film) =

1992 Welsh anti-war biopic

- Directed by: Paul Turner
- Written by: Alan Llwyd
- Starring: Huw Garmon
- Distributed by: S4C
- Release date: 1992
- Running time: 123 minutes
- Country: United Kingdom
- Language: Welsh

Hedd Wyn is a 1992 Welsh anti-war biopic, written by Alan Llwyd and directed by Paul Turner.

Hedd Wyn won the Royal Television Society's Award for Best Single Drama and BAFTA Cymru Awards in several categories; and was the first Welsh language film nominated for an Academy Award.

== Background ==
Based on the life of Ellis Humphrey Evans (Huw Garmon), killed in the First World War, the cinematography starkly contrasts the lyrical beauty of the poet's native Meirionnydd with the bombed-out horrors of Passchendaele. The protagonist is depicted as a tragic hero with an intense dislike of the pro-war jingoism which surrounds him. The film's title is Ellis Evans's bardic name (pronounced [heːð wɨ̞n], "blessed peace"), under which he was posthumously awarded the Bardic Chair at the 1917 National Eisteddfod of Wales.

== Plot ==
As a farmer's son in the village of Trawsfynydd, Ellis Humphrey Evans composes poetry for local eisteddfodau under the bardic name Hedd Wyn ("Blessed Peace"), dreaming of being crowned Chief Bard at the National Eisteddfod. When, in August 1914, Britain declares war on Germany, several young men from Trawsfynydd join the British Army, including Ellis' friend Griff. Despite mounting pressure, Ellis refuses to enlist and says that he does not think he can kill anyone.

On a train, Ellis encounters Jini Owen, a young woman who admires his poetry. Noticing her interest in him, Ellis asks for Jini's address and sends her a letter. Soon the two are deeply in love. Not long afterwards, an official of the draft board arrives at the family farm and takes down the names of Ellis and his brother Bob, despite the resistance of Ellis' mother. As a result, the board informs the Evans family that one of their sons must enlist in the British Army.

Although 17-year-old Bob longs to enlist instead, Ellis refuses to permit this. Horrified of losing him, Jini pleads with Ellis to let Bob enlist in his place but Ellis says he could never live with himself if Bob were injured or killed, so departs to join the Royal Welch Fusiliers in Liverpool and after training is sent to the front in France. Facing what may be his last chance to win the Eisteddfod, Ellis pleads with his platoon commander to send his awdl Yr Arwr (The Hero) via the Army Postal Service.

On 31 July 1917, the Fusiliers go over the top and into the Battle of Passchendaele. Ellis witnesses his fellow soldiers being shot and blown to pieces around him before, finally, he is wounded by shrapnel and crumples to the ground. After hours lying in no man's land, Ellis is evacuated to an aid post, where he succumbs to his injuries. His parents are devastated when they receive a telegram informing them of his death. Jini weeps inconsolably as she reads Ellis' last letter, in which he proposes marriage. Soon after, the Evans family receives another telegram which announces that Ellis' submission has won the National Eisteddfod and the chair which Ellis has dreamed of all his life is delivered to his parents' farmhouse, robed in black.

== Commentary ==
Hedd Wyn has been cited by Kate Woodward of Aberystwyth University as one of "a number of films produced for S4C which ... scrutinized the trinity of dynamic tensions that existed between Wales, England and 'Britain'". It is described as "expressing the feelings of Welsh men who are fighting the British cause in wartime, despite their being at odds with aspects of the conflict and the priorities of a Westminster government....In the film, the war-mongering attitude is synonymous with England and Englishness, and the Welsh and English languages are persistently juxtaposed....[T]he Welsh language is a site of struggle, but by exploring its difference with the English language, it is also a means of defining and strengthening one's identity".

== Awards ==
Hedd Wyn was the first British film to be nominated for Best Foreign Language Film, in 1993, at the U.S.-based Academy of Motion Picture Arts and Sciences Academy Awards. Its nomination as a film from the United Kingdom – as opposed to Wales – caused controversy. Hedd Wyn's awards include the Royal Television Society's Award for Best Single Drama (1992), Celtic Film Festival's Spirit of the Festival Award (1993), First Prize at the Belgium Film Festival (1994) and a section award at the Karlovy Vary International Film Festival (1994).

== See also ==
- Cinema of Wales
- List of Welsh films
- List of British submissions for the Academy Award for Best Foreign Language Film
- List of submissions to the 66th Academy Awards for Best Foreign Language Film
