= Richard Cyril Hughes =

Welsh educator and historian (1932–2022)

Richard Cyril Hughes (1932 – 1 April 2022) was a Welsh educator, writer and historian.

== Biography ==
Hughes was born in Tara Street, Holyhead, Isle of Anglesey in 1932. A graduate and Masters from University of Wales Aberystwyth, he started his teaching career of Welsh at Grove Park School in Wrexham and Rhiwabon before moving to Bangor Normal College to lecture in education. He became an early pioneer for the teaching of subjects through the medium of Welsh and worked as a Senior Education officer for Gwynedd Education Authority before taking early retirement 1998. He married Elizabeth Ann (Nan Evans) from Cynwil Elfed, Carmarthen in 1959. They were the parents of actor Huw Garmon and three older sons – Rhiryd Hughes, Rhys Hughes and Sion Hughes (television executive and novelist) – and have eleven grandchildren.

Hughes authored a series of novels chronicling the life of Henry VII (Harri Tudur who descended from the Tudur family of Penmynydd Isle of Anglesey) close relative, influential, and dynastic "Mother of Wales" Catrin o Ferain, Dinas Ddihenydd and his third Castell Cyfaddawd, won the Daniel Owen Prize at the National Eisteddfod in 1984. He also published a fictional account of a father and son's journey from Penmynydd to battle in "Maes Bosworth" in successful support of their kindred Harri. He lived in Penmynydd and Llanfairpwllgwyngyll. Hughes died on 1 April 2022, at the age of 89.

== Works ==
- Catrin o Ferain (1975)
- Dinas Ddihenydd (1976)
- Castell Cyfaddawd (1984)
- Maes Bosworth (2005)
