= Paul Turner (director) =

Welsh film director (1945–2019)

Paul Turner (December 1945 – 1 November 2019) was a Welsh film director. His film Hedd Wyn (1992) became the first Welsh film to be nominated for the Academy Award for Best Foreign Language Film.

Born in Devon, Turner learned Welsh while working at the BBC in the early 1980s and was a vocal supporter of Plaid Cymru. He was reportedly "blacklisted" from the BBC for his nationalist views (reported in an article in The Observer). S4C director called him "a man with vision and a fire in his heart for all things Welsh and the Welsh language and his desire to portray that on film".

Paul had two daughters during his first marriage to Sheila Ford, He had 3 grandchildren. His second marriage was to Welsh actress Sue Roderick. He died in November 2019 at the age of 73.

== Awards ==
He won several international awards as well as having his film Hedd Wyn nominated for the Academy Award for Best Foreign Language Film.

== Filmography ==
- Tra Bo Dwy (1984)
- Wil Six (1984)
- Hedd Wyn (1992)
- Cwm Hyfryd (1993)
- Porc Pei (1998)
- Dial (Wild Justice)

== Television ==
=== English language ===
- The Life and Times of David Lloyd George (1981)

=== Welsh language ===
- Derfydd Aur (Fools Gold)
- Trisgel
- Porc Pei (1998)
- Wil Six
- Arswyd y Byd / Tales From Wales
