= Huw Garmon =

Welsh actor

- Born: 1966 (age 58–59); Llangefni, Anglesey, Wales
- Occupation(s): Actor; Lecturer
- Spouse: Wife
- Children: 3

Huw Garmon (born 1966) is a Welsh actor, probably best known for playing the eponymous lead in the Oscar-nominated Welsh language film Hedd Wyn (1992). He has also taken part in various television series and has currently taken an academic post at Glyndŵr University, combining it with his acting roles.

Born in Llangefni in Anglesey, Garmon is the youngest of four sons of the Welsh historian and novelist Richard Cyril Hughes. He obtained a degree in drama studies from Aberystwyth University. Although he is best known for Welsh language roles, he has also appeared on English language television, notably in Cadfael with Derek Jacobi, as well as having parts in a number of films. These included Hedd Wyn (1992), in which Garmon starred and which was the first Welsh film to be nominated for Best Foreign Language Film at the Academy Awards. Other films included Bride of War (1998) and Killer Elite (2011).

He was a regular in the S4C soap opera Pobol y Cwm between 1997 and 2004, in the role of Steffan Humphries, and has been a script writer for the series. He has also appeared in Coronation Street, and in 2016 joined the cast of the S4C soap opera Rownd a Rownd. In 2010 he joined the academic staff of Glyndŵr University where he lectures on theatre and television performance, stating that "After 20 years of acting, directing, screenwriting, writing stories and working abroad as an actor, I wanted a change". He intends to continue in this career part-time while returning to television work.

Garmon is married with three children.
