= Ogwyn Davies =

Welsh artist

Ogwyn Davies (1925 – 26 December 2015) was a Welsh artist, born in Trebanos in the Swansea Valley. He studied at the Swansea School of Art, before living and working in Tregaron, Ceredigion. He taught art at Ysgol Uwchradd Tregaron from 1955 to 1985, while also maintaining and developing his independent career as an artist. He was elected to the Royal Cambrian Academy (RCA) in 1994.

Representative paintings include Dolbadarn Castle and Soar Y Mynydd.

== Personal life ==
He was married to Beryl and had two children, Huw and Nia.
