= RMS Ophir =

Orient Line ocean liner

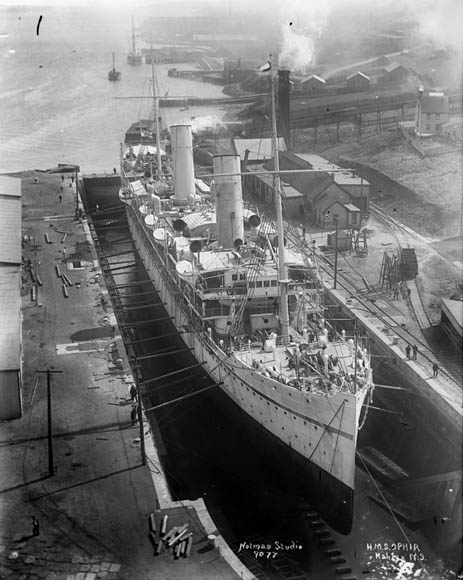
- Ophir in dry dock in Halifax, Nova Scotia in 1901

History

United Kingdom
- Name: Ophir
- Namesake: Ophir
- Owner: Orient Steam Navigation Company
- Operator: (United Kingdom) Royal Navy (1901, 1915–19)
- Port of registry: (United Kingdom) Glasgow
- Route: London – Suez Canal – Colombo – Sydney
- Builder: Robert Napier & Sons, Govan
- Yard number: 421
- Launched: 11 April 1891
- Completed: October 1891
- Identification: UK official number 98673; code letters MJGD; 1915: pennant number M 92; 1918: pennant number MI 82; by 1918: call sign GYB
- Commissioned: as Royal Yacht, February 1901
- Decommissioned: as Royal Yacht, 6 November 1901
- Recommissioned: as AMC, 26 January 1915
- Decommissioned: as AMC, 29 July 1919
- Fate: Scrapped in 1922

General characteristics
- Type: ocean liner
- Tonnage: 6,910 GRT, 3,323 NRT
- Length: 465.0 ft (141.7 m)
- Beam: 53.4 ft (16.3 m)
- Draught: 24 ft 6 in (7.47 m)
- Depth: 34.1 ft (10.4 m)
- Decks: 4
- Installed power: 1,398 NHP, 9,500 ihp
- Propulsion: 2 × screws; 2 × triple-expansion engines
- Speed: 18 knots (33 km/h)
- Capacity: Passengers: 230 first class, 142 second class, 520 steerage; refrigerated cargo: 52,400 cubic feet (1,480 m^{3})
- Armament: 1915: 6 × 6-inch (150 mm) guns

RMS Ophir was an Orient Steam Navigation Company (Orient Line) steam ocean liner that was built in 1891 and scrapped in 1922. Her regular route was between London and Sydney via the Suez Canal, Colombo and Melbourne.

In 1901 she was the royal yacht HMS Ophir, taking the then Duke and Duchess of Cornwall and York on a tour of the British Empire. From 1915 to 1919 she again served in the Royal Navy, this time as an armed merchant cruiser. After the First World War she was laid up, and in 1922 she was scrapped.

== Building and identification ==
Robert Napier and Sons built Ophir in Govan, Glasgow, as yard number 421. She was launched on 11 April 1891 and completed that October. Her registered length was 465.0 ft (141.7 m), her beam was 53.4 ft (16.3 m) and her depth was 34.1 ft (10.4 m). Her tonnages were 6,910 GRT and 3,323 NRT. She had berths for 892 passengers. Her cargo holds included three refrigerated chambers, with a combined capacity of 52,400 cubic feet (1,480 m^{3}).

Ophir had twin screws, each driven by a three-cylinder triple-expansion steam engine. The combined power of her twin engines was rated at 1,398 NHP or 9,500 ihp, and gave her a speed of 18 knots (33 km/h).

Orient Line registered Ophir at Glasgow. Her United Kingdom official number was 98673 and her code letters were MJGD. By 1918 her wireless telegraph call sign was GYB.

== Ocean liner ==
One appreciative passenger was "the Welsh Swagman" Joseph Jenkins who embarked at Melbourne on 24 November 1894, bound for Tilbury in a second-class cabin at the fare of £26 15s 6d. When he first saw the ship, he thought it so huge that he wrote "it is a wonder to me that it would move". Jenkins, a noted diarist, detailed the 103-day voyage passing through the new Suez Canal.

== Royal yacht ==
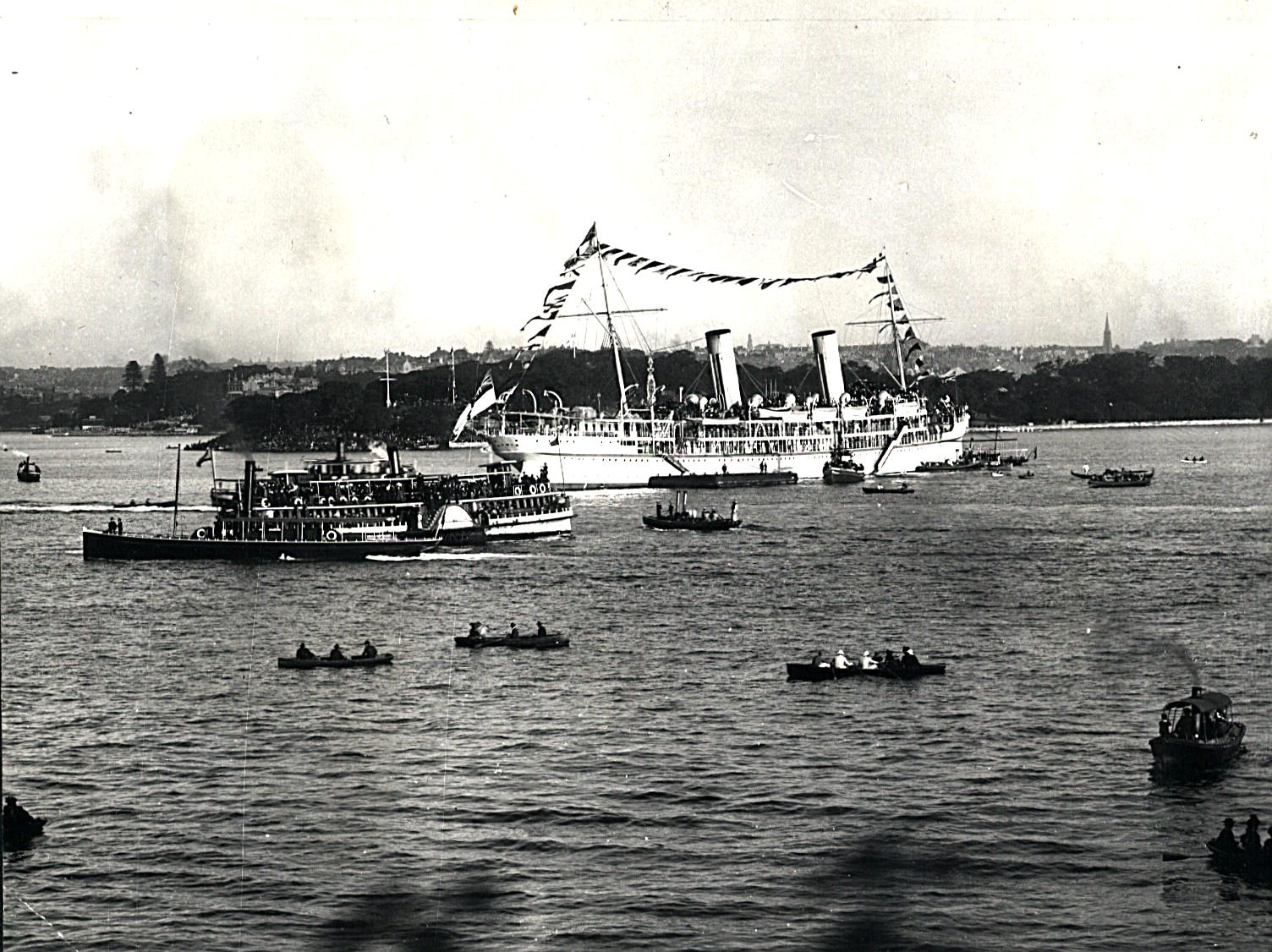
The royal yacht HMS Ophir dressed overall in Sydney in 1901

In 1901, as HMS Ophir, she took the Duke and Duchess of Cornwall and York (the future King George V and Queen Mary) on their tour of the British Empire. The visit was scheduled to open the new Federal Parliament in Melbourne, Australia, and also visited Gibraltar, Malta, Ceylon, the Straits Settlements, New Zealand, South Africa, Canada, and Newfoundland. The Royal Navy provided deck crew for the tour, and the engine room staff were from the Orient Line.

A petty officer Harry Price was with the tour from February to November 1901. He wrote a record, which was later published. A chief petty officer McGregor, working for Alfred John West's "Our Navy" company, filmed the cruise. Cinema film and lantern slides of the cruise were shown to the British Royal Family and staff at Sandringham House on 9 November 1901. (Ref: Personal diary of the Prince of Wales (later King George V), 10 November 1901: "Afterwards West and McGregor showed the cinematograph photographs, taken by the latter, during our tour in the Colonies in the ball room, all the tenants & servants came, they were interesting but not very successful." Diary Extract reproduced by the permission of Her Majesty Queen Elizabeth II.)

On the completion of the royal tour, Ophir was paid off at Tilbury 6 November 1901.

== Armed merchant cruiser ==
After the UK entered the First World War, the Admiralty requisitioned Ophir for conversion into an armed merchant cruiser. She was armed with six 6-inch (150 mm) guns. She entered service on 26 January 1915 as HMS Ophir, with the pennant number M 92. On 26 February the Admiralty bought her from Orient Line.

Ophir joined the 9th Cruiser Squadron. On 21 March 1915 she left Tilbury, and by 25 March she was off the coast of Portugal. She patrolled between Gibraltar, the Canary Islands, Madeira and the Azores. In March 1916 she extended her patrol to the Cape Verde islands. She was dry docked in Gibraltar in July 1915, and a second time in March and April 1916, after which she lay at Gibraltar until June. She then patrolled to Cape Verde, Madeira and Dakar until September 1916, when she returned to Devonport.

From Devonport, Ophir returned to patrolling between Cape Verde, Dakar and Sierra Leone. She was at Gibraltar from 22 December 1916, and dry docked there from 19 January to 1 February 1917. On 15 February she left Gibraltar, and patrolled to Sierra Leone. On 28 February she left Sierra Leone, and on 13 March she reached Plymouth. There is a gap in her surviving logbooks from 31 March 1917 until 1 April 1918.

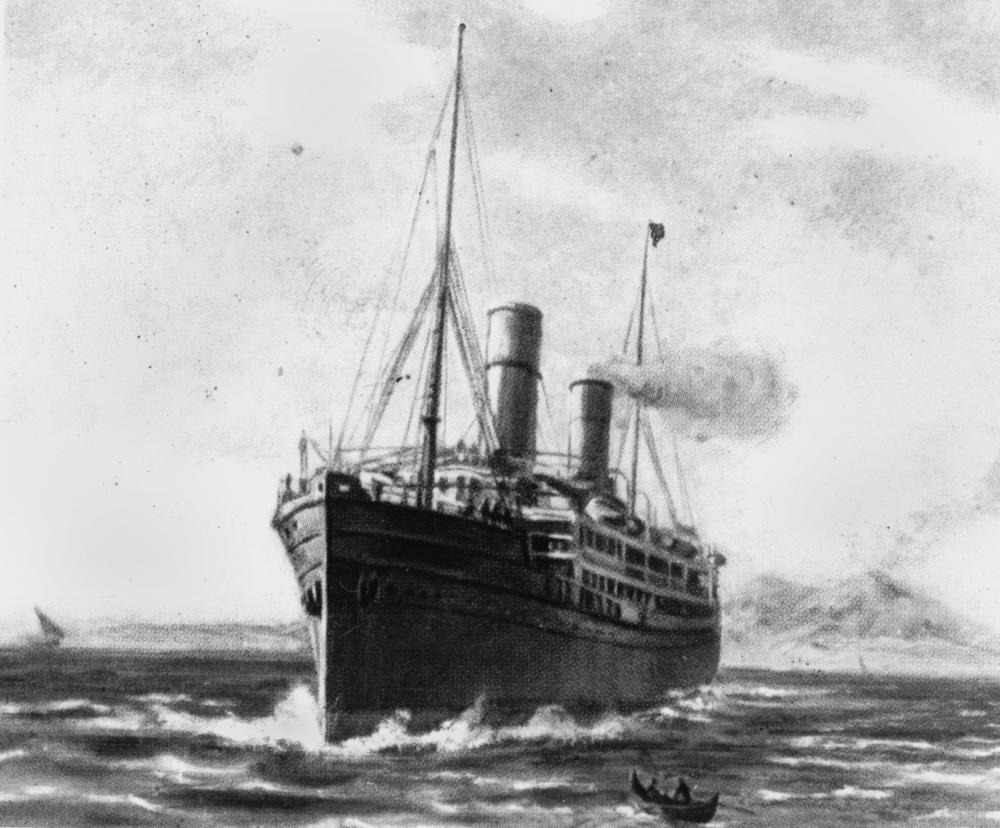
Artist's impression of Ophir under way

In January 1918 Ophir's pennant number was changed to MI 82. From 5 to 11 April 1918 she was anchored off Sierra Leone. She then steamed to Cape Town, where she was in port from 23 April to 1 May. From 9 to 12 May she was at Mauritius, and from 23 to 27 May she was in Singapore. From 1 to 26 June she was in Hong Kong, and from 2 to 5 July she was in Singapore again. She patrolled the north coast of Borneo until 5 August, and then was in Hong Kong from 10 to 27 August.

Ophir then crossed the Pacific via Hawaii to Peru. She was in Honolulu Harbor from 14 to 19 September, Paita from 7 to 10 October, and Callao from 13 to 28 October. She then patrolled south to Mollendo, and then ports along the coast of Chile to Valparaíso, where she was in port from 14 to 24 November. She then patrolled south to Talcahuano and Coronel, and back to Valparaíso, where she was in port again from 29 November to 3 December. She then headed north, called at ports in northern Chile, and on 26 December passed through the Panama Canal. She remained at Cristóbal, Colón until at least 31 December 1918, when her surviving logbooks end.

In 1919 Ophir was laid up in the River Clyde, and then on 29 July she was paid off. In August 1921 she was sold for scrap, and in 1922 she was broken up at Troon.

== Bibliography ==
- Jenkins, Joseph (1975). Evans, W (ed.). Diary of a Welsh Swagman 1869–1894. Melbourne: Macmillan.
- Lloyd's Register of Shipping. Vol. I.–Steamers. London: Lloyd's Register of Shipping. 1914.
- The Marconi Press Agency Ltd (1918). The Year Book of Wireless Telegraphy and Telephony. London: The Wireless Press, Ltd.
- Mercantile Navy List. London. 1892 – via Crew List Index Project.
- Nicolson, Harold (1959). "Ophir itinerary". King George V: His Life and Reign. New York: Doubleday.
- Osborne, Richard; Spong, Harry; Grover, Tom (2007). Armed Merchant Cruisers 1878–1945. Windsor, UK: World Warship Society. ISBN 978-0-9543310-8-5.
- Phillips, B (2002). Pity the Swagman. Aberystwyth: Cymdeithas Lifrau Ceredigion Gyf.
- Price, Harry (1980). The Royal Tour or the Cruise of H.M.S. Ophir 1901: Being a lower deck account of their Royal Highnesses the Duke and Duchess of Cornwall and York's voyage around the British Empire. Dartmouth: Webb & Bower. ISBN 978-0906671108.
