= Nia Caron =

Welsh actress

- Born: Nia Caron Lewis; Llwyn y Groes, Ceredigion, Wales
- Education: Aberystwyth University
- Occupation: Actress
- Spouse: Geraint Jarman (m. 1987; died 2025)
- Children: 2

Nia Caron is a Welsh television actress who is known for playing Anita Pierce in the long running soap Pobol y Cwm from 1999 to 2026.

== Early and personal life ==
Caron grew up in Llwyn y Groes near Tregaron, Ceredigion. She is the daughter of the artist Ogwyn Davies.

Caron was married to the late musician Geraint Jarman. The two met while acting on the Welsh series Glas y Dorlan. They have two daughters, Hanna and Mared Jarman, and live in Cardiff. Their youngest daughter, Mared, is also an actress, and lives with Stargardt disease.

== Filmography ==
=== Television ===
Year	Title	Role	Notes
	Glas y Dorlan		
1983–1986	Torri Gwynt	Various characters	
1985	Penyberth	Young Girl	
1986	Bowen a'i Bartner	Hafwen	Series 1, Episode 2
1986	Clymau	Aelod o Teulu Pant Glas 1865	
1986–1989	Rhagor o Wynt	Amrywiol	
1987	Dihirod Dyfed	Mary Ann Severne	
1987	Darlun		
1987	Hafod Henri	French Woman	
1990–1991	Pobol y Cwm	Jane Leonard	
1994–1996	Glanhafren	Catrin Williams	
1997–1999	Tair Chwaer		
1999	Porc Pei	Dilys Price	TV film
2000–2005	Porc Peis Bach	Dilys Price	
1999–present	Pobol y Cwm	Anita Pierce	Series regular
2001	Penwythnos Gethin a Brenda	Brenda	
2002	What?		Short film
2003	O Flaen Dy Lygaid	Narrator	Episode: Creu Mewn Corwynt
2019	Merched Parchus	Menna	Main role
