= Bethan Phillips =

Welsh author and scriptwriter

- Born: 1934
- Died: October 30, 2019

Bethan Phillips (1934 – 30th October 2019) was a Welsh author and scriptwriter. She was best known for writing the S4C TV series (broadcast in 1987 & 1991) and subsequent book (published in 1991), both called Dihirod Dyfed. She also wrote for the 1980s TV docudrama series Almanac.

She wrote a Welsh-language book called Rhwng Dau FydI, which was shortlisted for the Wales Book of the Year. She later released an English-language translation called Pity the Swagman. The books were biographies based on the diaries of the Welsh swagman Joseph Jenkins.

== Bibliography ==
- Dihirod Dyfed (Hughes, 1991)
- Rhwng Dau Fyd - Y Swagman o Geredigion (Ceredigion Book Society, 1998)
- Pity the Swagman: The Australian Odyssey of a Victorian Diarist (Ceredigion Book Society, 2002)

== Personal life ==
Bethan Phillips lived in Lampeter. She was educated at Aberystwyth University and, as well as writing, worked as a teacher and lecturer. She was married to John Phillips, a writer and former Director of Education and Chief Executive of Dyfed County Council and was a mother of two. At the end of her life, Bethan Phillips was living with dementia and resided in a care home. She died at the age of 84 on 30th October 2019. A family service was held at Aberystwyth Crematorium on 18th November 2019, followed by a memorial service at Shiloh Chapel, Lampeter.
