= Alfred John West =

British photographer

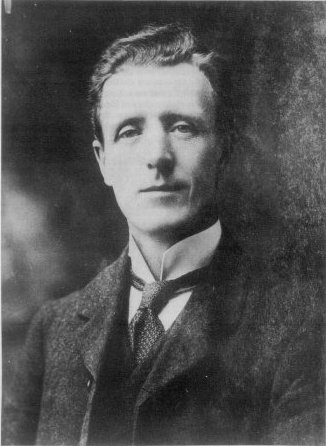
Alfred John West F.R.G.S. Cinematographer

== Photographer and Cinematographer, owner of 'Our Navy' film series 1898-1913 ==
=== Summary ===
Alfred John West F.R.G.S. (1857–1937) was a British award-winning marine photographer in the Gosport firm of G. West and Son from 1881 (for an early reference see Exhibition Catalogue of the Photographic Society of Great Britain) and from 1897 at the age of 40, a pioneer cinematographer. He was then active in both roles until 1913 when he sold his copyright in negative plates of yachting studies to Beken of Cowes, and his stock of positive moving film in 1916 to a distributor, James Joseph Bennell, proprietor of: B. B. Film Hiring Service, 81, Dunlop Street, in Glasgow (see 'The Bioscope' - Thursday 7 September 1916 p 944 https://www.britishnewspaperarchive.co.uk/titles/the-bioscope) On the closure of the business, the film stock was then sold onwards to the 'Argosy Film Co. Ltd' in 1917 a company also registered at 81 Dunlop Street on 2 August 1917 (See 'The Bioscope' - Thursday 20 September 1917 page 6) which was in film business through the 1920s but was liquidated in 1930, the business passing to 'Audible Filmcraft' which was itself wound up in 1931. It is believed that the positive film stock was transferred from West to B.B. Hiring without completing the purchase.

West confirms in his unpublished autobiography Sea Salts and Celluloid (1936) that he sold the film hire business to a Glasgow distributor to be paid for over several years but that he "kept the negatives". However he was never paid and the bulk of the film stock cannot now be traced.

=== Extant Film Clips ===
A few tantalising clips remain as does a full descriptive catalogue in the British Library of all the moving film he created under the 'Our Navy' brand. Some potential clips have been located in the British Film Institute's online collection and those found so far are listed on the Our Navy website. The stock of A. J. West's negative plates was sold to Beken of Cowes in 1913 and was reported (2020) as being prepared for sale as a complete archive of yachting prints by the Brett Gallery Midhurst Hampshire. West's plates are said to be numbered from 500 to 10250 in the Beken/Brett archive.

=== Death ===
Alfred West died on 15 January 1937 and is buried at Highland Road Cemetery Portsmouth in Hampshire (E Plot, Row 19, Grave 14). The Grant of Probate lists the value of his estate as being £1,733 2s 6d which is equivalent to £104,804.78 in April 2026.

=== Archive of advertisements, reviews and newspaper references ===
An extensive collection of newspaper references relating to West's work has been created from 2020 to date (latest edit is shown in the document).

== Business ==
From c. 1880 Alfred John West worked alongside his brothers and sisters in his father George West's photographic business 'G West', then after c. 1879 'G West and Son' at 97 High Street in Gosport, Hants, and later at 72 and 84 Palmerston Road Southsea. He became a nationally and internationally famous marine photographer, winning many national and international medals for his studies of yachts in full sail. His portrait of the Mohawk winning at the Royal Southampton Yacht Club Regatta in 1888 was awarded the gold medal at the St. Louis Convention USA for which nine other countries competed.

In 1897 he converted to the newly developed 'Living' or 'Animated' Pictures and by 1898, his personal cinematographic business 'Our Navy' based in an annexe called 'The Anchorage' at his home 'Rozel' 7 Villiers Road Southsea, had a full-time staff of 50. In 1902 he formally registered the name 'Our Navy' under Limited Company number 72532 (National Archives Kew – Piece details BT 31/9737/72532). A search through the British Newspaper Archive between 1898 and 1913, has revealed over 2000 detailed instances of advertisements and reviews in 360 titles across the U.K., Australia, New Zealand and Canada which mention the 'West' and 'Our Navy' combination of search terms. A summary document is available which contains the newspaper references.

Alfred West's cinematographic activity from 1897 was in exhibiting films related to Naval, and later Military, Empire and Yachting subjects under the general title of 'Our Navy', later 'Our Army and Our Army'. The shows were presented in Town Halls and other large halls and later in purpose-built cinemas across the UK and the British Empire.

The London home of 'Our Navy' was the Regent Street Polytechnic (now the University of Westminster), which still houses one of London's first purpose-built cinema halls, the Regent Street Cinema. The Lumiere Brothers gave the first ever public film show of moving pictures in the United Kingdom on 21 February 1896 in the hall. (A programme of restoration has been carried out which has revived the cinema and revealed a few of its late 19th-century features). 'Our Navy' also exhibited at The Crystal Palace and the People's Palace in the Mile End Road.

== Photographic methods ==
Alfred J. West invented his own shutter and stabilising devices and mounted his heavy dry plate camera in the well of a sailing yawl. This was manoeuvred by his boatman under the lee of large racing yachts to obtain the best shots of these heavily-canvassed vessels at full speed.

In 1898, during the early period of cinematographic technical development, his employee James Adams was granted a patent for "Improvements in and relating to cameras and projecting Apparatus for Kinematograph Pictures" (No. 9738 of AD 1898) by the UK Patent Office.

== Photographing Turbinia ==
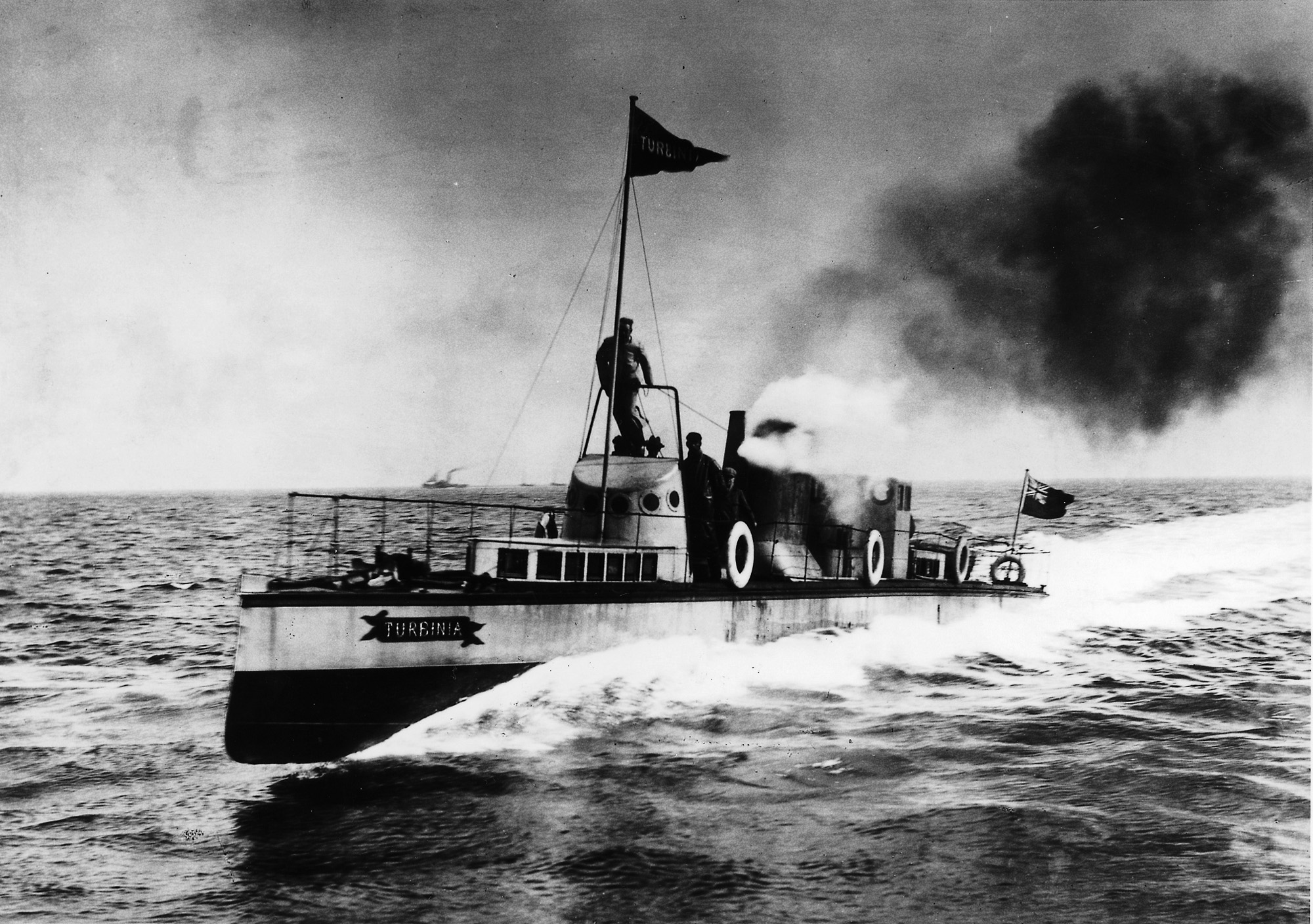
Turbinia photographed by Alfred J. West

In 1897, Alfred J. West obtained photographs of the Turbinia steam yacht travelling at full speed at the Royal Fleet Review. He was subsequently invited by Charles Algernon Parsons to film and photograph the vessel in the Tyne and the pictures captured remain the defining image of Turbinia at speed. Sir Charles Parsons is believed to the person standing in the conning tower in this picture. None of the moving pictures have survived.

West writes in his (unpublished) 1936 autobiography as follows:

It was at this same Review that a wonderful little vessel named the Turbinia appeared, steaming through the Fleet at 35 knots, a speed never before achieved on water. She was the first ship to be fitted with the turbine machinery invented by her owner, the Hon. C. A. Parsons of Newcastle-on-Tyne, and a great sensation was caused by her steaming through the lines at such a speed. Whilst she was at anchor in Portsmouth Harbour, I went aboard and told the owner that I would like to get a snap of his craft going at full speed. "No one has succeeded yet, although many have tried", replied Mr. Parsons. "I should like to have a shot at her", I persisted. "Alright, so you shall!" he said with a smile, "I will make another run through the fleet tomorrow, look out for me between lines A. and B. at noon. That should give you an opportunity. "I'll be there, opposite the Flagship", I told him. Punctually at 12 o'clock there appeared between the leaders of the lines a smother of foam – it was the Turbinia. As she raced past the Flagship, I was waiting in my launch and took a flying shot of her. When I developed the plate I was delighted to find that I had "got her", and the owner was so pleased with the result that he invited me to take a number of photographs and a cinematograph film of his craft on the Tyne.

Subsequently, West's 'Our Navy' made regular use of this shot in its publicity and brochures, and the moving pictures of the vessel were frequently shown as part of the performances and referred to specifically in the promotional material associated with the shows as ' Turbinia ... showing the effects of foam etc '.

== Royal Command Performances – 1898 and 1901 ==
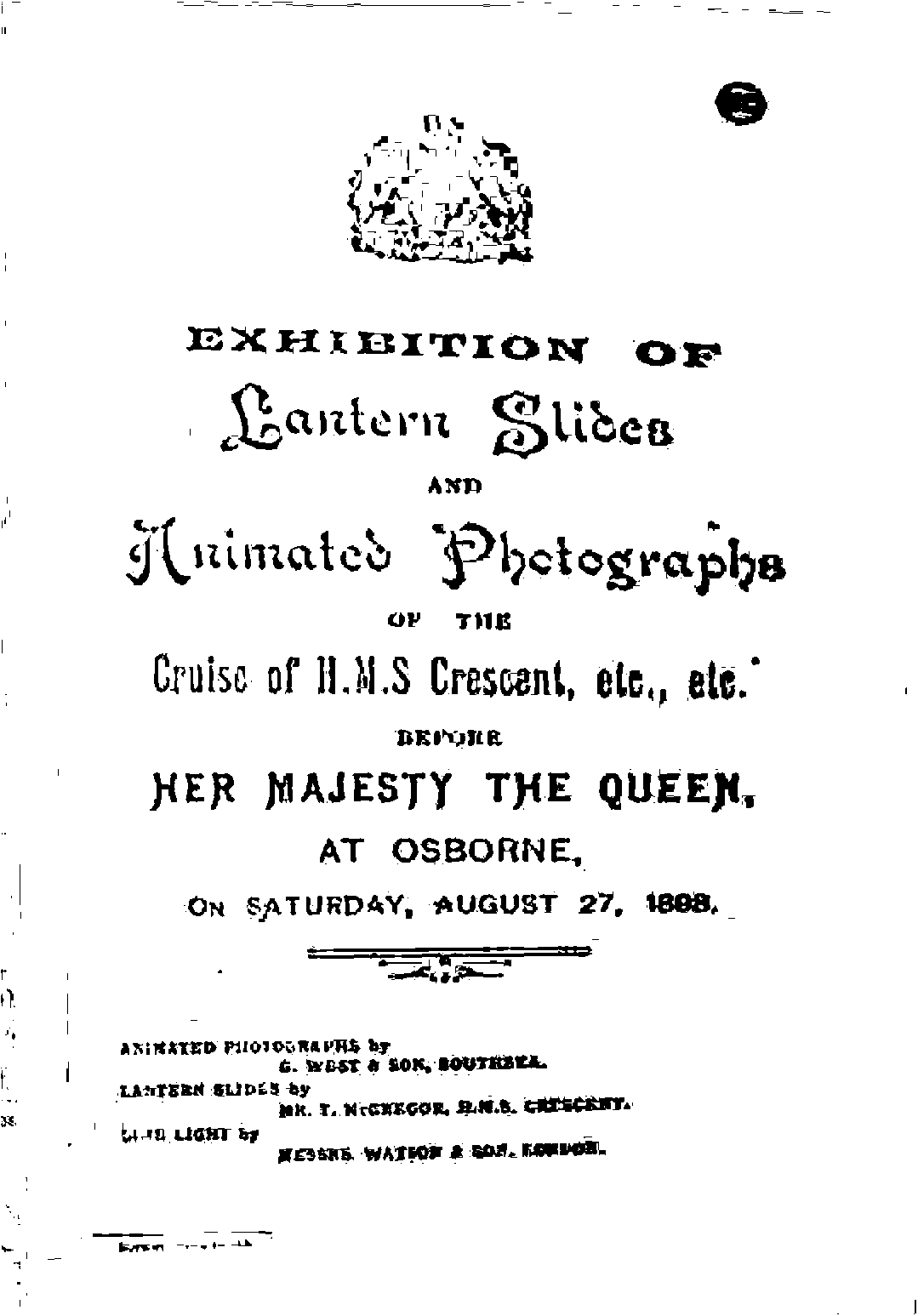
Cruise of HMS Crescent – G. West and Sons

In 1898, Alfred J West embarked with his staff member Chief Petty Office Thomas McGregor as ship's photographer and cinematographer on the three-month cruise of HMS Crescent, commanded by The Duke of York (later George V). On its return to port, he gave a Royal Command Performance of the material to Queen Victoria at Osborne House in the isle of Wight. The Duke of York wrote a short review of the performance in his diary for 27 August 1898 "After dinner West showed his animated photographs & McGregor the photos he took on bd. The 'Crescent' on a screen, very well done" (Diary Extract reproduced by kind permission of HM The Queen)

A second Royal Command performance showing 'animated photographs' was given to Edward VII, his family and Estate staff on 9 November 1901 at Sandringham. The film shown at that presentation was taken by Alfred West's assistant, Chief Petty Officer McGregor, who had been taken on board as official photographer for "Our Navy" for the world cruise of the royal yacht HMS Ophir. The cruise was undertaken by The Prince of Wales (later George V) and his family. Although West wrote proudly in his unpublished autobiography that the event was successful and involved ministers of state and other guests, the Prince of Wales wrote about this occasion on 10 November 1901 saying: "Afterwards West and McGregor showed the cinematograph photographs, taken by the latter, during our tour in the Colonies in the ball room, all the tenants & servants came, they were interesting but not very successful." (Diary Extract reproduced by kind permission of HM The Queen). For more detail see also 'The Cruise of H.M.S. Ophir' 1901 on the 'Our Navy' Website

== Trafalgar centenary 1905 ==
At the culminating Albert Hall celebrations on 21 October 1905, Alfred West showed a programme of patriotic and nautical films. The Times of London reported on 20 October: "... Mr Alfred West, well known for admirable kinematographic shows of a naval character, will give a novel one, illustrating the reception of the French Fleet". The show also featured a sequence of a very old seaman who had served with Admiral Hyde-Parker (one of Nelson's captains) accompanied by a petty officer from the Royal Naval Barracks and two boys from the Royal Seamen and Marines' Orphanage. The action took place on the quarterdeck of HMS Victory, the elderly seaman showing a young boy the features of the ship – the ship's wheel, the memorial plaque 'Here Nelson Fell' and culminating in the laying of a wreath. This sequence survives as one of the extant film clips of 'Our Navy'.

== Endorsement of BOROID safety film ==
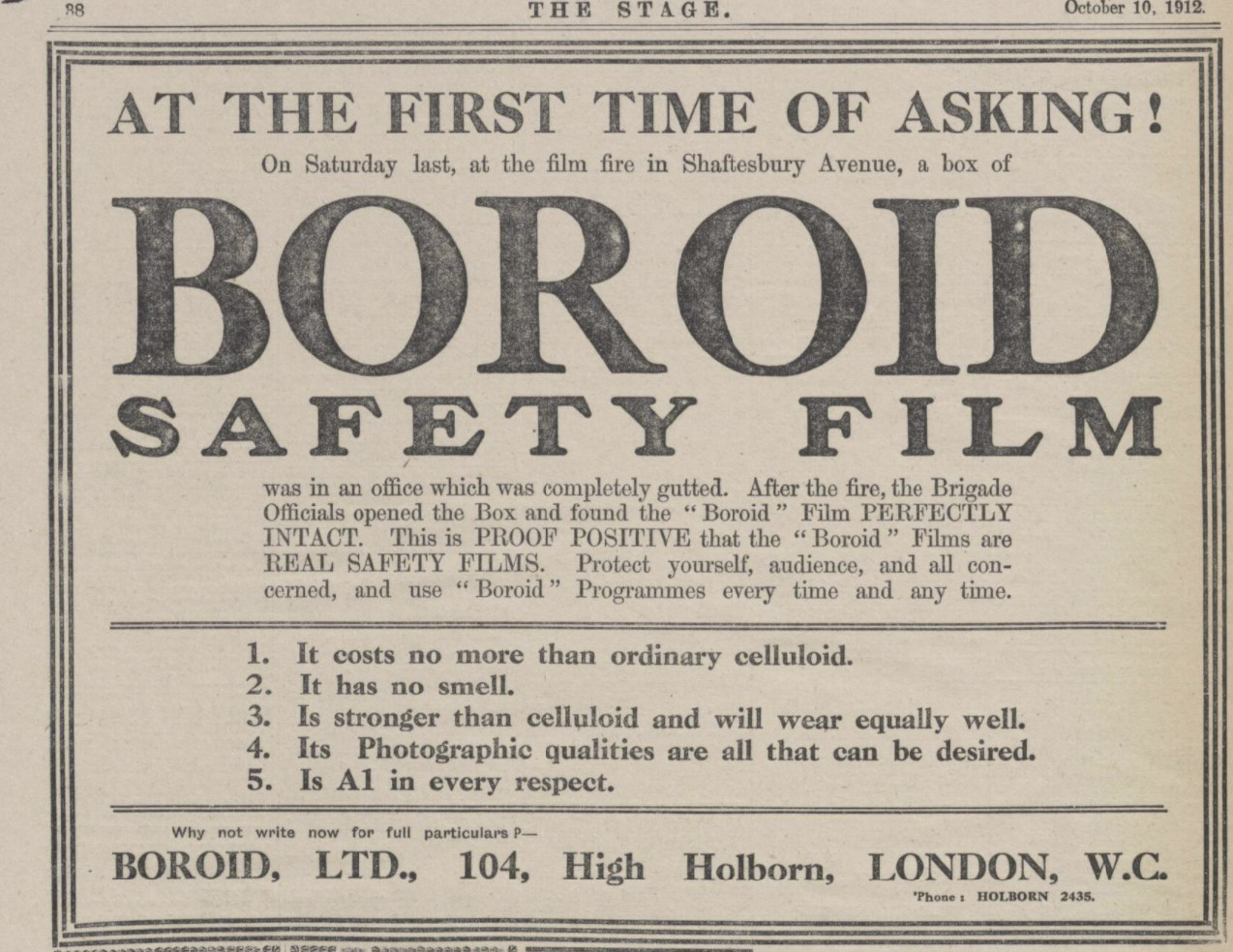
BOROID advertisement 'The Stage'

In 1910, West enthusiastically endorsed a new, non-inflammable, film format 'BOROID' which was presented to the British cinematographic trade using acetate-based cellulose. It was developed, he claimed 'accidentally', by the prolific inventor Benno Borzykowski, a partner in Photochemie G.m.b.H. Berlin, and Director of the Benobor Syndicate, who had worked on patents for artificial silk and other fabrics. BOROID' was a by-product of that work but was not patented. Borzykowski published other UK patents which substituted acetates for celluloid, including "patent application number 21,719 for A New or Improved Process for the Production of a Substitute for Glass Sheets or Plates and other Articles." in 1910.

The Boroid company commenced trading on 21 November 1910, being originally registered in London at 58 Coleman St., moving to 104 High Holborn in May 1911, and finally to 48 Rupert St. in June 1913. Boroid Ltd. issued its detailed share prospectus in the (Westminster Gazette of Monday 16 January 1911 (P12 col. 1 and 2): A number of testimonials were provided, including a very detailed one from Alfred J West F.R.G.S. of 'Our Navy', in which he proposed to move his entire production to 'non-flam' BOROID film: 'BOROID' had most of its assets in Germany, and the Great War of 1914-1919 put an immediate end to the business in the UK when BOROID film stock became unavailable, although it was claimed by Borzykowski in 1919 that 'several million feet' a week were being sold in the UK before being forced to close there. A Receiver was appointed by the debenture holders on 12 May 1914 (The London Project). Borzykowski moved to America in 1915 and recommenced work on Boroid (Educational Film Magazine April 1919 P 22-25 : P 136 in PDF file. In this article he refers to Alfred West's detailed and strong endorsement of Boroid safety film. In July 1910, West had taken part in a dramatic demonstration at the Criterion Restaurant (reported in 'The Globe' (Saturday 02 July 1910, P11, Col 4) "... in the course of which its non-inflammability was amply shown. Whereas a cigarette end applied to a piece of ordinary celluloid caused it to burst into flame almost immediately, the new substance, which has all the transparency and pliability of celluloid, merely melted away when exposed to the flame of a lighted match. A piece of celluloid and a piece of the new substitute were also placed successively in a cinematograph machine and exposed to the concentrated heat rays. The celluloid flamed within three seconds, but the Boroid remained exposed for three or four minutes and appeared to be quite unaffected." (See also The Referee - Sunday 03 July 1910 P3, col 4)

== Use of West's archive of films in wartime - 1914 onwards ==
Although the film material had been sold by West to B. B. Film Hiring Service in 1913, the material was not out of the limelight as the war drew nearer, being formally declared on 4 August 1914. With such a large archive at their disposal it seems that the company assembled a series of up to eight parts of archive naval material and 5 parts of similar army material for distribution to cinemas as the war was declared. Kinematograph Weekly of 13 August 1914 reported that: "Mr. Walker, the Newcastle representative for a large number of London film houses, was besieged on Monday for vacancies of "Our Navy" and "Life in the British Army", while Pathe's" Curse of War" was sought for at double the price." By 14 August, South London Press (P1 Col6) was announcing "LIFE IN THE BRITISH NAVY." and "LIFE IN THE BRITISH ARMY." BY ALFRED WEST F.R.G.S." By 27 August, Kinematograph Weekly was reporting "Practically all the North Wales picture theatres are now showing war news, and such pictures as "Our Navy in Action" and ”Army Manoeuvres" prove good draws. Topicals of the departure of local Territorials are also being shown." On 8 October, Kinematograph Weekly reported "Mr. Somers, the local manager at the B.B. Film Service, Great Ducie Street, gives us to understand that their many war pictures, "Our Navy," etc., are in great demand." The presentations of these two series continued countrywide until 1919 when they were offered for sale (Kinematograph Weekly 10/07/1919) after which there are few if any press references to presentations of the films.

== Films eventually presumed destroyed ==
The Portsmouth Evening News reported on 06/05/1935 (P6, Col6) that the films were eventually transferred to the Gaumont British company, but that in 1935 they were presumed destroyed as sequences relating to the funeral of Queen Victoria could not then be found.

== Ephemera collections ==
Much work was done by the late twin brothers John and William Barnes, film historians, in tracking down and collecting ephemera related to Alfred West, 'Our Navy' and the G. West and Son precursor business. This is held for posterity in the Barnes Collection at Hove Museum and Art Gallery. Some material not yet deposited and catalogued is held privately.

Books of press cuttings collected from South Coast newspaper libraries by West's grandson, Antony Scott Clover (1917–1998), are held in the family, as are some facsimile copies of ephemeral material and prints of yachting plates. A review of all the newspaper articles and advertisements for Alfred West and Our Navy compiled in 2020-2024 (and ongoing) from the British Newspaper Archive and Australian and New Zealand sources is available as a PDF file at https://drive.google.com/file/d/1WAE1AADDCN9gL3FiCVx7eR3l7S3KcSgi/view

A series of cigarette cards and postcards in a numbered series were produced to accompany the 'Our Navy' presentations and these were widely circulated and are still collected by specialists.

'Spot' promotional material included slips of paper promoting the show which were enclosed in a blue wrapper to give the appearance of medical 'powders' often taken for headache and other ailments. Hundreds of these were placed in public places awaiting discovery.

== Extant film clips ==
The few clips that are still extant of West's film are held as originals in the BFI National Archive and are curated by the Wessex Film and Sound Archive at Winchester, Hants.

They can also be viewed in low resolution on the 'Our Navy' Website

The following titles are listed (amongst others) at the Internet Movie Database. It is not yet known who has compiled the list or from what source, but the titles listed are convincing:

- The Bombardment of Port Arthur 1904
- Attack and Defence by Sailors 1898
- Away Aloft: Climbing the Rigging on Board the St. Vincent 1898
- Away Boats' Crews 1898
- Barbette Guns in Action 1898
- Boats of the Channel Squadron Pulling Round the Fleet 1898
- Commander Giving Instructions: Beat to Quarters 1898
- Commander Giving Instructions: Dismiss 1898
- H.M.S. Crescent Leaving Portsmouth Harbour 1898
- H.M.S. Crescent Steaming at Full Speed 1898
- Lee Bow View of Crack Yachts 1898
- March Past on the Quarterdeck 1898
- Midshipmen at Physical Drill 1898
- Naval Brigade Firing Royal Salute on Southsea Common 1898
- On Board H.M.S. Majestic: All Hands on Deck 1898
- One Design Yacht Gybing Round Outer Spit Buoy 1898
- Portsmouth Dockyard Gates 1898
- Seamen at Drill: Sailors at Field Gun Drill 1898
- Seamen at Drill: Sailors at Single Stick Exercises 1898
- The Channel Squadron Getting Under Way 1898
- Torpedo Practice 1898
- Turbinia 1898
- Two Best Dancers in the Navy Dancing on the Forecastle 1898
- Weather View of Yacht Racing in Rough Sea 1898

These entries may relate to extant clips preserved from the period, or they may simply have been copied from a contemporary catalogue.
