= River Brenig =

River in Wales

Coordinates: 52.22°N 3.934°W

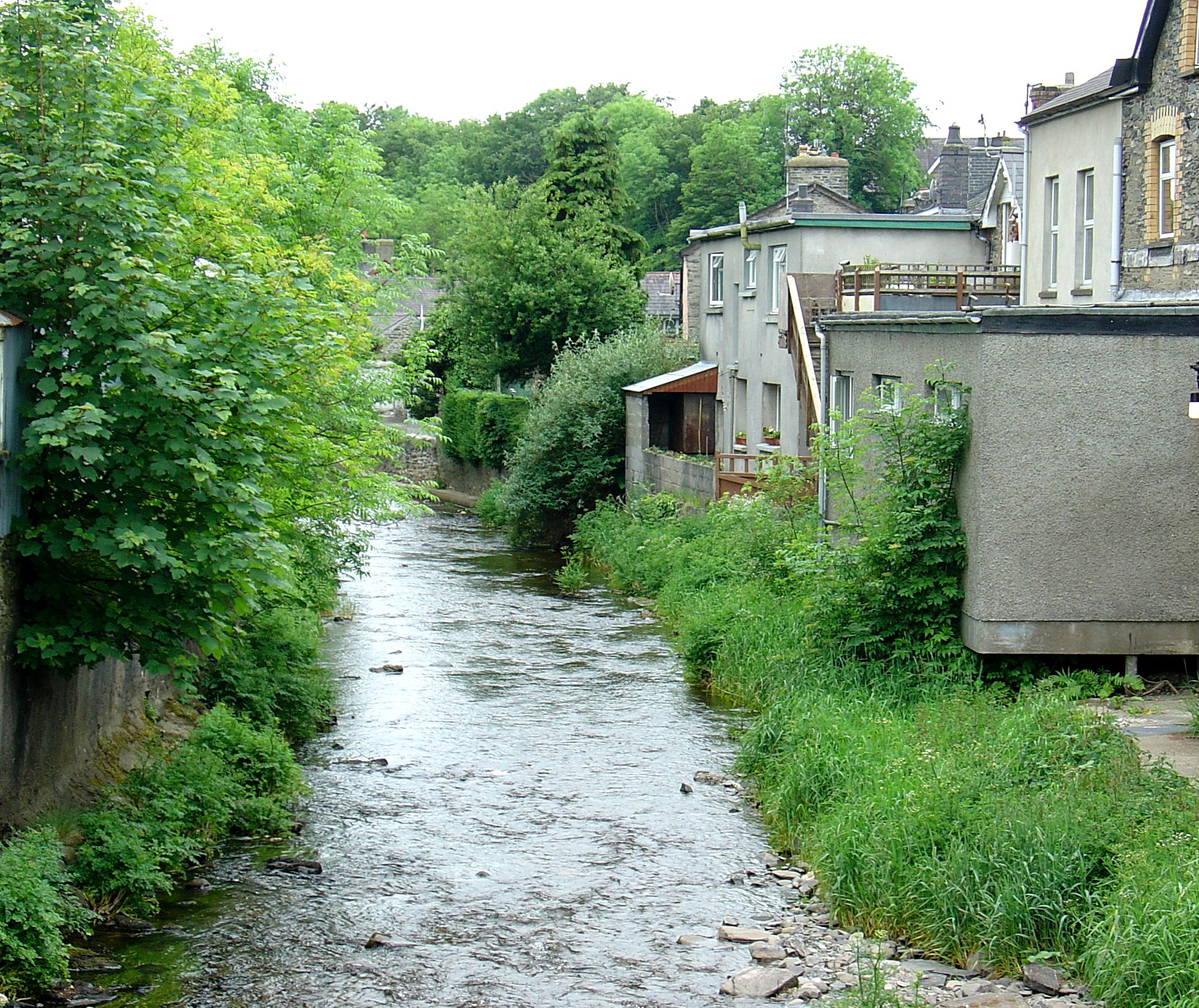
River Brenig in Tregaron

The River Brenig (Afon Brenig) is a tributary river of the River Teifi and runs through the market town of Tregaron in Ceredigion, Wales.

== Course ==
It is formed from the confluence of the Afon Groes and Afon Berwyn in the foothills of the Cambrian Mountains.

The Brenig meets the River Teifi just below Tregaron.

== Hydrology ==
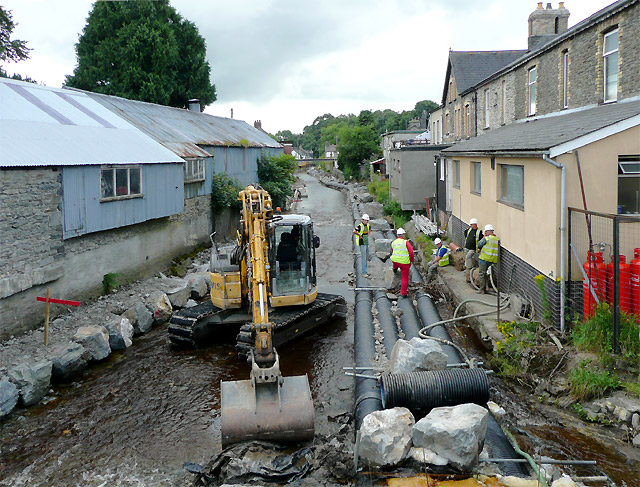
Pipelaying during the flood protection works in 2009

Between 2008 and 2010, a £2.7m development project by Environment Agency Wales began in Tregaron to protect the town from the river flooding. This involved lowering the riverbed and building floodgates, as well as implementing improvements to existing floodwalls.

== Ecology ==
The Brenig is home to otters, with infrastructure being created for the animals in the 2008 project.

The river was once frequented by Atlantic salmon but their numbers have declined. Brown trout are prevalent in the river and larger specimens can be caught in the narrower parts where the water runs deeper. Several 1 pound (0.45 kg) fish have been caught along with a local record 4 pounds (1.8 kg) fish which can be seen mounted in the Talbot Hotel. Recently a 2.5 pounds (1.1 kg) fish was caught in the river. Many eels can also be found.

== History ==
Prior to 1840, sections of the river were canalised to safeguard a local turnpike road.

The area was used as a special stage during the 2015 Wales Rally GB.
