= Annie Davies =

Welsh radio and television producer

Annie 'Nan' Davies
- Born: 16 June 1910; Tregaron
- Died: May 7, 1970 (aged 59)
- Known for: Welsh language radio and television producer

Annie 'Nan' Davies (16 June 1910 – 7 May 1970) was a Welsh radio and television producer.

== Early life and education ==
Annie Davies was born on 16 June 1910, to David and Elizabeth Davies, who lived and farmed in the Tregaron area. The third of six siblings, she was usually known as Nan. Davies attended schools in Castell Fflemish and Tregaron, before studying for a degree at U.C.W. Aberystwyth, from which she graduated in History and Latin in 1933.

== Career ==
Davies first joined the staff of the BBC in 1935 (as secretary to journalist and broadcaster Sam Jones, Head of the BBC in Bangor, North Wales), leaving her position with Cardiff City Library. In 1946 she left the BBC and took up a position with Welsh language youth organisation Urdd Gobaith Cymru.

She worked in four roles at the Urdd before returning to BBC Bangor as producer of Radio Talks in 1949, before moving to the BBC's Cardiff headquarters in 1955. There Davies worked as programme editor for the literary radio programme Llafar and produced (and later edited) the television programme Heddiw (Today in English), the first television programme to discuss national and international matters in Welsh.

Davies was responsible for the production of programmes such as Shepherd's Calendar, Nant Dialedd, Prynhawn o Fai, and Bugail Cwm Prysor. On 25 May 1965 Davies presented Patagonia 1865-1965, a portrait of the Welsh colony in Patagonia, doing the voiceover in Welsh.

She continued to work for the BBC until her retirement in 1969, when she returned to Tregaron.

== Personal life ==
On 7 May 1970, Davies died in Singleton Hospital, Swansea. She was buried in the graveyard of Bwlchgwynt chapel, Tregaron.
