= Geraint Jarman =

Welsh musician (1950–2025)

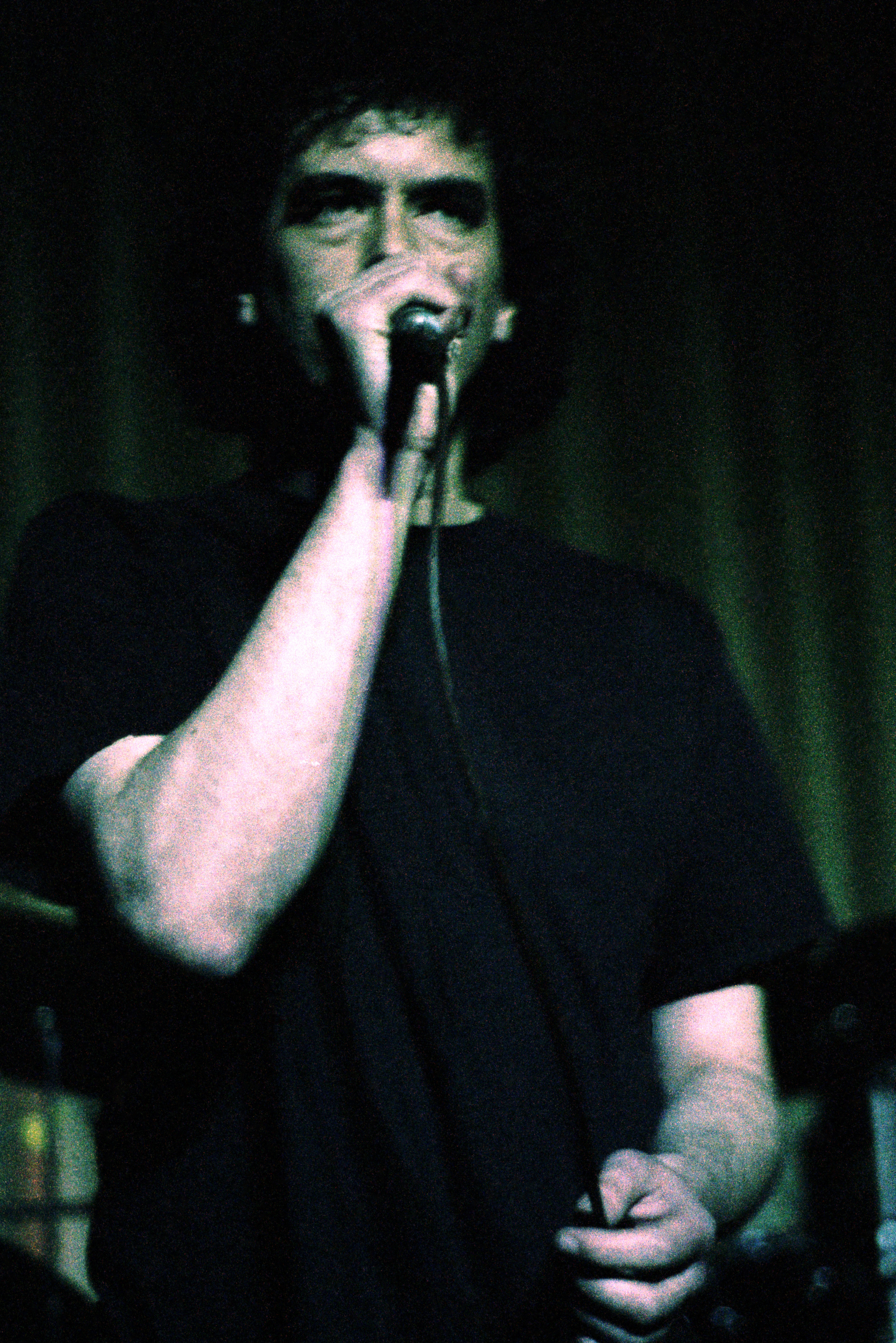

Background information
- Born: 17 August 1950; Denbigh, Wales
- Origin: Cardiff, Wales
- Died: 2 March 2025 (aged 74); Cardiff, Wales
- Genres: Folk, post punk, reggae, rock, ska
- Occupation(s): Musician, poet, television producer
- Years active: 1967–2025
- Labels: Sain, ankstmusic
- Spouse: Nia Caron (m. 1987)

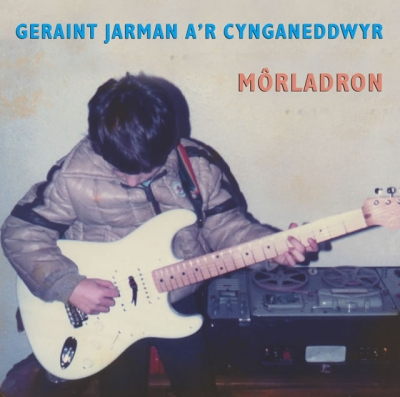
Album cover of Môrladron

Geraint Jarman (17 August 1950 – 2 March 2025) was a Welsh musician, poet and television producer whose career dates back to the early years of Welsh popular music. He recorded many albums as a solo artist and with his band Geraint Jarman a'r Cynganeddwyr.

== Early life and career ==
Jarman was born on 17 August 1950 in Denbigh, but grew up in Cardiff. His career began in the 1960s as a poet and composer, writing for Heather Jones. He was a member of Y Bara Menyn with Jones and Meic Stevens before establishing himself as a solo artist. He also wrote "Y Brawd Houdini", one of Stevens' most popular recordings. He introduced genres such as reggae into Welsh music and released many albums as a solo artist and with his band as Geraint Jarman a'r Cynganeddwyr (Geraint Jarman and the Poets, referring to the cynghanedd techniques of formal Welsh poetry), his first album (Gobaith Mawr y Ganrif) released in 1976 by Sain. In the late 1970s, he was championed by John Peel who introduced him to a wider audience through his BBC Radio 1 show.

Gruff Rhys, in the liner notes of the Welsh Rare Beat album, paid tribute to Jarman's influence, stating "Jarman helped to sever ties with Celtic folk and serve as a bridge to a new wave of post punk/post Sain Welsh language artists in the 1980s and beyond who had a less self-conscious relationship with their Welsh identity." The BBC described him as the "father of Welsh rock".

He trained as an actor in the 1970s and appeared in the comedy series Glas y Dorlan. In 1982 he became the voice of SuperTed in its original Welsh-language version. Jarman co-produced the S4C television show Fideo 9, which gave important exposure to a later generation of Welsh bands. He also had several volumes of poetry published, including Cerbyd Cydwybod (2012, Gomer Press).

== Personal life and death ==
Jarman was married to actress Nia Caron, with whom he had two daughters, Hanna and Mared; Mared, the couple's youngest daughter, is an actress living with Stargardt disease. Jarman also had a daughter, Lisa, from his first marriage to the singer Heather Jones.

His autobiography, Twrw Jarman, was published in 2011.

Jarman died in Cardiff on 2 March 2025, at the age of 74.

== Discography ==
- Gobaith Mawr y Ganrif (1976), Sain
- Tacsi i'r Tywyllwch (1977), Sain
- Hen Wlad Fy Nhadau (1978), Sain
- Gwesty Cymru (1979), Sain
- Fflamau'r Ddraig (1980), Sain
- Diwrnod i'r Brenin (1981), Sain
- Macsen (1983), Sain
- Enka (1985), Sain
- Taith y Carcharorion (1986), Sain - Geraint Jarman & Maffia Mr Huws
- Rhiniog (1992), Ankstmusic
- Y Ceubal Y Crossbar A'r Quango (1994), Ankstmusic
- Eilydd Na Ddefnyddiwyd / Sub Not Used (1998), Sain
- Môrladron (2002), Sain
- Pirates (2002)
- Brecwast Astronot (2011), Ankstmusic
- Dwyn yr Hogyn Nol (2014)
- Cariad Cwantwm (2018)

Compilations

- Goreuon Geraint Jarman A'r Cynganeddwyr - Cyfrol 1 (1991), Sain
- Atgof fel angor (2008), Sain - 15CD retrospective
