= Tregaron railway station =

Former railway station in Wales

General information
- Location: Tregaron, Ceredigion; Wales
- Coordinates: 52.2230°N 3.9360°W
- Grid reference: SN6784960076
- Platforms: 2

Other information
- Status: Disused

History
- Original company: Manchester and Milford Railway
- Pre-grouping: Great Western Railway

Key dates
- 1 September 1866: Opened
- 22 February 1965: Closed
Location

Tregaron was a railway station in Wales on the former Carmarthen to Aberystwyth Line serving Tregaron, Ceredigion, Wales.

The Manchester and Milford Railway (M&MR) opened from Pencader to Aberystwyth on 12 August 1867. The line went into receivership from 1875 to 1900.

Ordnance Survey maps show that the railway station was built with two platforms, a passing loop, a goods shed, goods yard sidings and signal box. The Great Western Railway (GWR) took over the service in 1906 and fully absorbed the line in 1911. The station, and GWR, passed on to British Railways upon nationalisation in 1948. It was then closed by the British Railways Board.

Although proposed for closure in the Beeching Report, serious damage due to flooding south of Aberystwyth closed that section in December 1964. The cost of repairs was deemed unjustified and led to the withdrawal of passenger services in February 1965; however, milk trains continued to run from Carmarthen to nearby Pont Llanio until 1970.

| Preceding station | Disused railways | Following station |
|---|---|---|
| Pont Llanio | Great Western Railway; Carmarthen to Aberystwyth Line | Alltddu Halt |

== Bibliography ==
- Butt, R. V. J. (October 1995). The Directory of Railway Stations: details every public and private passenger station, halt, platform and stopping place, past and present (1st ed.). Sparkford: Patrick Stephens Ltd. ISBN 978-1-85260-508-7. OCLC 60251199. OL 11956311M.
