= Heddiw =

Former Welsh-language news television programme

- Country of origin: Wales
- Original language: Welsh

Production
- Production locations: New Broadcasting House, Cardiff, Wales
- Running time: 25-35 minutes
- Production company: BBC Cymru Wales

Original release
- Network: BBC Television (1961-1964); BBC One Wales (1964–1982)
- Release: 17 April 1961 – 30 July 1982

Related
- BBC Wales Today; Newyddion

Heddiw (English: Today) is a Welsh language television news and current affairs programme that was produced by BBC Cymru Wales between 17 April 1961 and 30 July 1982.

It was the first daily television programme in Welsh, covering at length Welsh, national and international news.

== History ==
Welsh-language television news on the BBC began at 6pm on 16 March 1956 in the form of Tele-Newyddion, a weekly 15-mninute newsreel broadcast as an opt-out on the Wenvoe, Sutton Coldfield and Holme Moss transmitters.

Coverage was expanded with the launch of Heddiw as a 20-minute topical magazine programme, first broadcast at 1.05pm on 17 April 1961, preceded by a 5-minute news bulletin.

From 24 November 1957, a weekly news review programme, O Sul i Sul (From Sunday to Sunday) was broadcast on the Wenvoe, Sutton Coldfield, Holme Moss and Crystal Palace transmitters. This was replaced from 14 August 1961 by Ddoe Heddiw (Welsh for 'Yesterday Today')

Annie Davies was the show's first producer (and later editor). Presenters of the programme included Owen Edwards, Robin Jones and Sulwyn Thomas.

Hywel Gwynfryn, who later had his own chat show, recounted how he was discovered by the Heddiw production team while working in a Cardiff pub.

Initially, Heddiw aired in a lunchtime slot on the Wenvoe, Blaenplwwyf, Sutton Coldfield and Holme Moss transmitters. But in later years, Heddiw moved to an early-evening slot in Wales following Nationwide, which incorporated the sister English-language programme Wales Today.

One of the programme's best-known signature tunes was a library track entitled Race the Sun by Johnny Scott, who had also composed the theme for Nationwide.

In 1974, production of Heddiw moved from a converted church in the Broadway area of Cardiff to Broadcasting House in Llandaff, where a dedicated colour television studio (C2) was opened to produce BBC Cymru Wales' news and current affairs programming.

For most of Heddiw's run, both the BBC and ITV offered competing Welsh-language TV news services - with TWW's Teledu Cymru service launching its own nightly programme, Y Dydd (Welsh for 'The Day'), in 1964 following the demise of the short-lived WWN franchise. Harlech Television (later HTV Cymru Wales) would take over production in 1968.

The introduction of a dedicated Welsh-language television channel would signal the end of both Heddiw and Y Dydd with either the BBC or HTV taking responsibility for S4C's Welsh language news service.

Both the BBC and HTV Cymru Wales bid for the provision of a news service for the new channel, but in 1981, HTV's decision to withdraw (following disagreements with ITN over the use of its material) saw the BBC win the contract by default.

Heddiw was broadcast for the last time at 7.05pm on Friday 30 July 1982 and replaced by short news bulletins as the BBC prepared to launch the nightly Newyddion Saith programme for S4C on 1 November 1982. A retrospective programme, Heddiw Ddoe, was broadcast by BBC One Wales on 5 October 1982, looking back at the history of Heddiw.
