= Joseph Jenkins (Amnon II) =

Welsh farmer, Australian diarist (1818–1898)

The three Australian faces of Joseph Jenkins: Swagman, rural labourer and man of letters. He had the photos taken in March 1871 to post home to Wales in explanation of the life he was leading. Each role was amplified by an accompanying descriptive poem of over 20 lines.

Joseph Jenkins (Bardic name: Amnon II) (27 February 1818 – 26 September 1898), was an educated tenant farmer from Tregaron, Ceredigion, mid-Wales who, when aged over 50, suddenly deserted his home and large family to seek his fortune in Australia. The Australian Dictionary of Biography says that "Jenkins's noteworthiness stemmed from the rich documentation of his experiences and thoughts that has survived". He was a consistent diarist for 58 years of his life and an award-winning poet.

He achieved fame posthumously from publication of some excerpts of his Australian writings. The compiler, his grandson Dr William Evans, a Harley Street cardiologist, coined the title Diary of a Welsh Swagman by which name he is familiar to generations of Victoria school students for whom the book became a prescribed history text in 1978.

== Early life and education ==
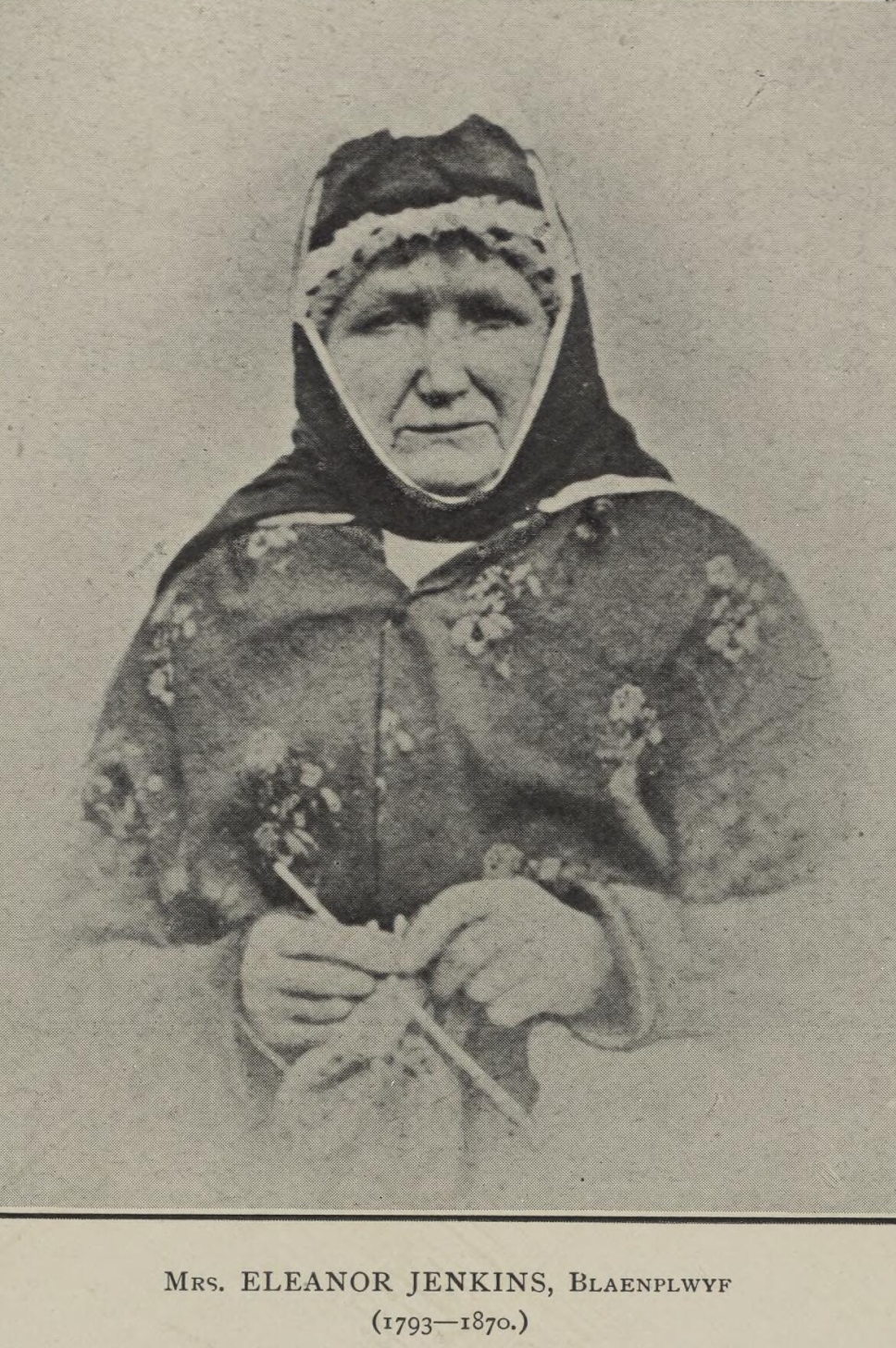
Jenkins' mother, Eleanor

Joseph Jenkins was born at Blaenplwyf farm near Ystrad Aeron in Ceredigion, Wales. He was the fourth child of 12 brought up by Jenkin Jenkins and Eleanor (née Davies). In 1846, he married his second cousin Elisabeth (Betty) Evans of Tynant. They purchased the lease of Trecefel farm, Tregaron and had nine children, the last of whom, John David, was born in April 1868.

Jenkins commenced education under a disciplinarian private tutor and later attended a small Unitarian church school at Cribyn, a five-mile walk from home. Throughout his life, he bewailed his lack of more formal education. However, his thirst for knowledge, religious temperament, and passion for reading and writing, proved a firm basis for continuing self-education.

== Agricultural skills ==
Under his management, Trecefel won many prizes in agricultural shows and its cattle fetched top prices in the market. In 1851, it was judged to be the best farm in the county. In 1861, Joseph was appointed to adjudicate the same competition.

Joseph Jenkins favoured the rotation system of growing crops, spoke against deep ploughing, favoured thorough harrowing, and was a strong advocate of the virtue of feeding the soil with farmyard manure. In his writings appearing in farming journals, he emphasised the importance of harvesting young hay, and preparing lucerne and clover crops to provide fodder for cattle during a severe and prolonged frost in winter and periods of drought in summer. . .

== Diaries ==
Joseph Jenkins in Wales, around 1896–97

For 58 years, Jenkins consistently maintained a diary of daily events. Though he was a native Welsh speaker, he penned the diaries in English as an aid to self-education. His biographer, Bethan Phillips, wrote in her foreword:

. . . The diaries reveal him as a man seeking to exorcise his own demons by attempting to escape from them, but they also reveal him as an astute observer of the people and occurrences impacting upon his own eventful life. His dogged determination in keeping a daily journal, often under the most difficult of circumstances and in the most unpropitious surroundings, has given us a uniquely valuable historical record of life in the nineteenth century.

=== Wales ===
The first entry was on New Year's Day, 1839. Though he continued to record each day, much of the early record has been lost. The earliest complete year extant is 1845. Manuscripts for the years 1839–1868 and 1895–1898, when he lived in Wales, are held by the National Library of Wales at Aberystwyth, together with his shipboard diary of the voyage from Liverpool to Melbourne.

=== Australia ===
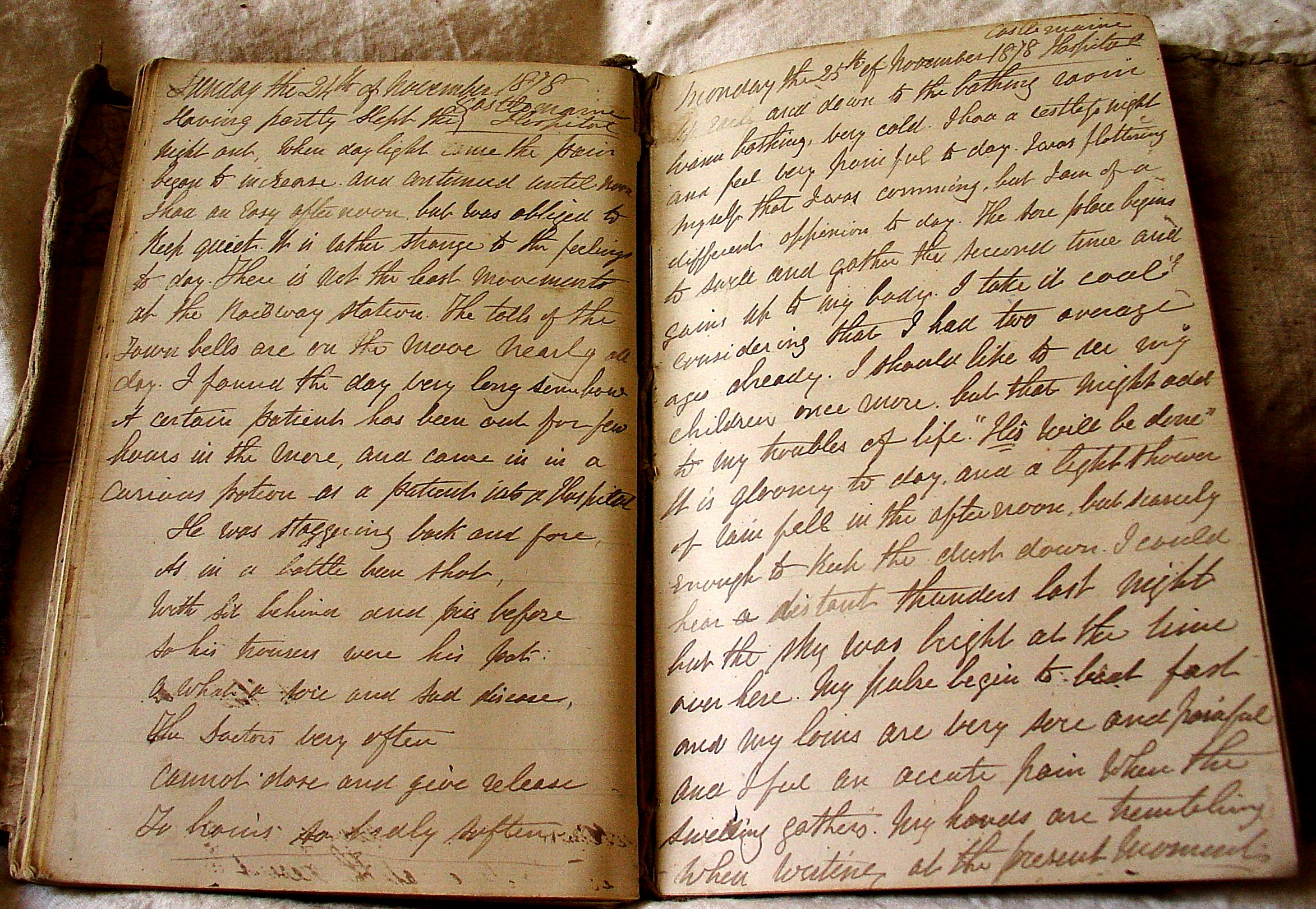
Diary entry for 24 November 1878, written while Jenkins was in Castlemaine Hospital

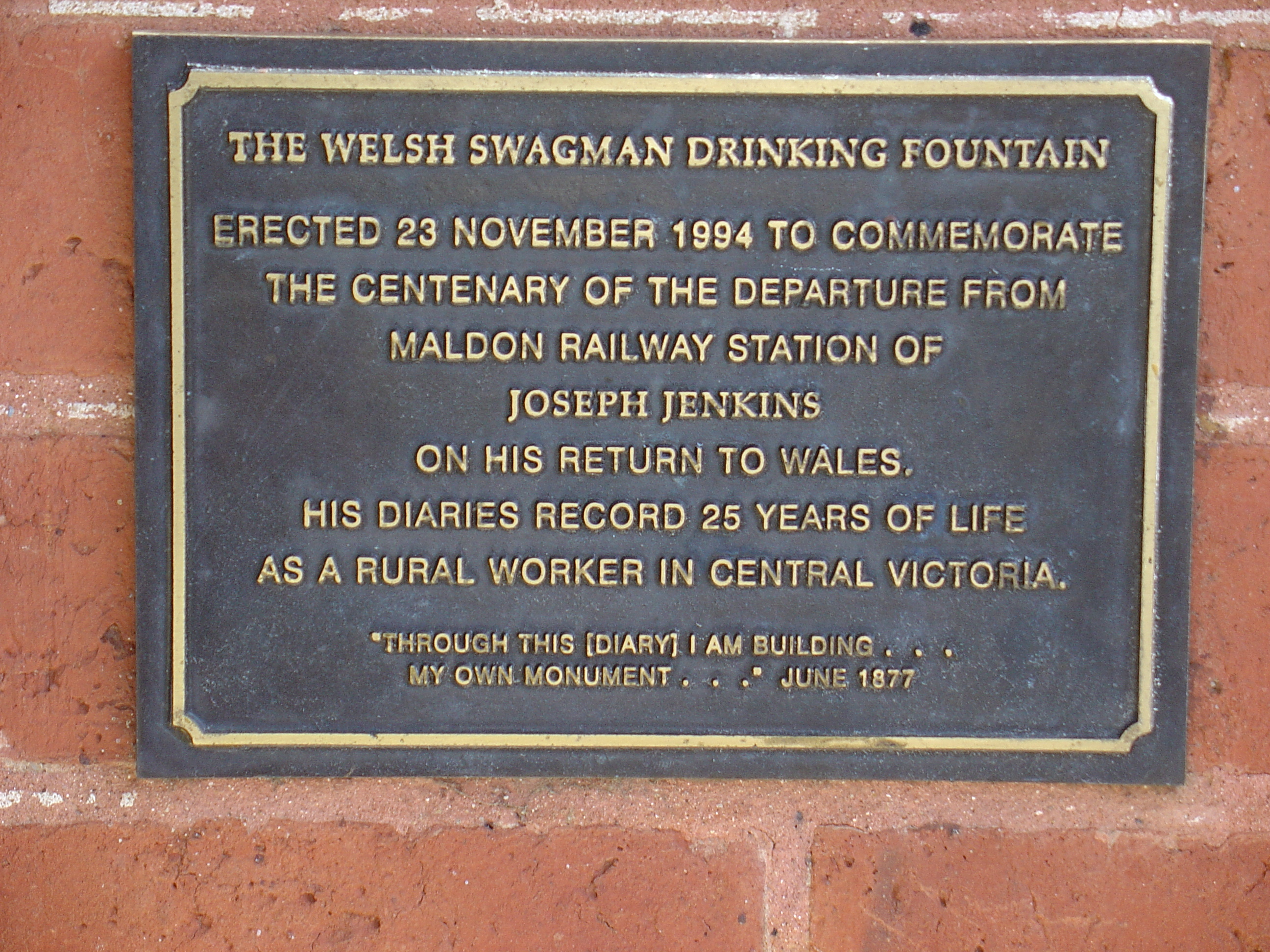
Plaque above drinking fountain installed at Maldon railway station to commemorate the centenary of the Welsh Swagman's departure in November 1894

Having sailed from Liverpool on the iron-hulled schooner Eurynome, Jenkins disembarked at Port Melbourne on 12 March 1869. The Eurynome was an 1163-ton sailing vessel, transporting casks of beer to Australia on the clipper route, with 12 passengers in a first-class saloon and 21 (including Joseph) who paid a much lower price to share frugal and unhygienic steerage accommodation on the voyage of 140 days, including three terrifying weeks of gales in the Roaring Forties.

The following month's diary records Jenkins carrying his swag, pessimistically prospecting and offering rural labour in and around the goldfields town of Castlemaine, where he found many fellow Welshmen. He rarely left that vicinity except to attend the annual St David's Day eisteddfod at Ballarat where, on thirteen consecutive occasions, he was awarded the premier prize for an englyn (Welsh verse form).

Jenkins obtained regular employment in 1884 as a cleaner of streets and drains in the town of Maldon, a few miles north of Castlemaine. He continued working there until he reached the age of 76, when he became homesick for Wales. Having saved the fare, he departed Maldon by rail on 23 November 1894, and embarked on RMS Ophir, which docked at Tilbury on 5 January 1895.

In 1994, a drinking fountain and a plaque were erected at Maldon railway station to recognise the centenary of Jenkins' departure, and his unique record of the life of a rural worker in Victoria. His own words were cited: Through this [diary] I am building . . . my own monument (pictured at right).

== Return and controversy ==
On returning to Wales, Jenkins entrusted the diaries to his daughter Elinor (Nell), who stored them in the attic of her home, Tyndomen Farm, near Tregaron. They came to light some 70 years later when a great-granddaughter, Frances Evans, recovered and protected them, permitting her uncle, Dr William Evans to read and edit the contents. Destruction of the diaries had been favoured by some family members who were concerned by their potential to arouse adverse reflection on reputations, especially that of Joseph's wife, Betty. The diaries record her alleged infidelity, and at least one physical assault on him by her and others: [26 May 1868] . . . my ribs and breastbone were fractured . . . I have an ugly black eye with about a dozen other different wounds. That was consistently cited by him as the cause of his leaving home.

However, no conclusive evidence has emerged that Betty was other than a loyal and capable wife, and one who may well have had good reason to find fault with Jenkins' own personality and behaviour. In Pity the Swagman, Bethan Phillips argues that Jenkins drank excessively while at home, though he generally abstained in Australia, and that he became disliked by neighbours for actively supporting landowners and the politicians who backed them, at a time when they were oppressing many tenant-farmers who promoted Liberal candidates.

== Historical studies ==
In 1904, information about Jenkins, with a photograph of him and a selection of his poetry in Welsh, was included in the book Cerddi Cerngoch by Daniel Jenkins and David Lewis. (The title is Welsh for "Poems of Redcheek", the bardic name of Jenkins' brother John, but the book also records the writing of several other distinguished family members.) Most of the book is printed in Welsh, but some prefatory pages are in English.

In 1998, Dr Bethan Phillips of Lampeter, having devoted many years to the project, including a visit to Australia, published her extensively researched account of Jenkins' life: Rhwng Dau Fyd: Y Swagman O Geredigion, followed by Pity the Swagman—The Australian Odyssey of a Victorian Diarist, in 2002.
