= 2015 Wales Rally GB =

Rally car race

Wales Rally GB 2015 71st Wales Rally GB
Round 13 of the 2015 World Rally Championship season
← Previous event
- Host country: United Kingdom
- Rally base: Deeside, Wales
- Dates run: November 12 – November 15, 2015
- Stages: 19 (310.15 km; 192.72 miles)
- Stage surface: Gravel

Overall results
- Overall winner: (France) Sébastien Ogier (France) Julien Ingrassia (Germany) Volkswagen Motorsport

The Wales Rally GB 2015 was the thirteenth and last round of the 2015 World Rally Championship season, held over 12–15 November 2015. The rally was won by Sébastien Ogier, his eight victory of the 2015 WRC season. It was also noticeable for the discovery and subsequent murder investigation of the Clocaenog Forest Man by two spectators.

== Entry list ==
Notable entrants
No.	Entrant	Class	Driver	Co-driver	Car	Tyre
1	(Germany) Volkswagen Motorsport	WRC	(France) Sébastien Ogier	(France) Julien Ingrassia	Volkswagen Polo R WRC	MI
2	(Germany) Volkswagen Motorsport	WRC	(Finland) Jari-Matti Latvala	(Finland) Miikka Anttila	Volkswagen Polo R WRC	MI
3	(France) Citroën Total Abu Dhabi WRT	WRC	(United Kingdom) Kris Meeke	(Republic of Ireland) Paul Nagle	Citroën DS3 WRC	MI
4	(France) Citroën Total Abu Dhabi WRT	WRC	(Norway) Mads Østberg	(Sweden) Jonas Andersson	Citroën DS3 WRC	MI
5	(United Kingdom) M-Sport Ltd	WRC	(United Kingdom) Elfyn Evans	(United Kingdom) Daniel Barritt	Ford Fiesta RS WRC	MI
6	(United Kingdom) M-Sport Ltd	WRC	(Estonia) Ott Tänak	(Estonia) Raigo Mőlder	Ford Fiesta RS WRC	MI
7	(Germany) Hyundai Motorsport	WRC	(Spain) Dani Sordo	(Spain) Marc Martí	Hyundai i20 WRC	MI
8	(Germany) Hyundai Motorsport	WRC	(New Zealand) Haydon Paddon	(New Zealand) John Kennard	Hyundai i20 WRC	MI
9	(Germany) Volkswagen Motorsport II	WRC	(Norway) Andreas Mikkelsen	(Norway) Ola Fløene	Volkswagen Polo R WRC	MI
10	(Germany) Hyundai Motorsport N	WRC	(Netherlands) Kevin Abbring	(United Kingdom) Sebastian Marshall	Hyundai i20 WRC	MI
12	(France) Citroën Total Abu Dhabi WRT	WRC	(France) Stéphane Lefebvre	(Belgium) Stéphane Prévot	Citroën DS3 WRC	MI
14	(Poland) Robert Kubica	WRC	(Poland) Robert Kubica	(Poland) Maciej Szczepaniak	Ford Fiesta RS WRC	P
20	(Germany) Hyundai Motorsport N	WRC	(Belgium) Thierry Neuville	(Belgium) Nicolas Gilsoul	Hyundai i20 WRC	MI
21	(Czech Republic) Jipocar Czech National Team	WRC	(Czech Republic) Martin Prokop	(Czech Republic) Michal Ernst	Ford Fiesta RS WRC	P
22	(Republic of Ireland) Josh Moffett	WRC	(Republic of Ireland) Josh Moffett	(Republic of Ireland) John Rowan	Ford Fiesta RS WRC	MI
23	(Republic of Ireland) Sam Moffett	WRC	(Republic of Ireland) Sam Moffett	(Republic of Ireland) Karl Atkinson	Ford Fiesta RS WRC	MI
33	(Italy) Motorsport Italia	WRC-2	(Norway) Eyvind Brynildsen	(Sweden) Anders Fredriksson	Škoda Fabia R5	MI
34	(France) PH Sport	WRC-2	(France) Quentin Giordano	(France) Valentin Sarreaud	Citroën DS3 R5	MI
37	(Italy) FWRT s.r.l.	WRC	(Italy) Lorenzo Bertelli	(Italy) Lorenzo Granai	Ford Fiesta RS WRC	P
38	(Ukraine) Yuriy Protasov	WRC-2	(Ukraine) Yuriy Protasov	(Ukraine) Pavlo Cherepin	Ford Fiesta RRC	P
39	Youth & Sports Qatar Rally Team	WRC-2	(Qatar) Adbulaziz Al-Kuwari	(United Kingdom) Clarke Marshall	Ford Fiesta RRC	
40	(United Kingdom) Drive DMACK	WRC-2	(Peru) Nicolás Fuchs	(Argentina) Fernando Mussano	Ford Fiesta R5	
43	(France) Team Oreca	WRC-2	(France) Eric Camilli	(France) Benjamin Veillas	Ford Fiesta R5	
45	(France) Saintéloc Junior Team	WRC-2	(Republic of Ireland) Craig Breen	(United Kingdom) Scott Martin	Peugeot 208 T16 R5	MI
46	(Italy) E2 Tre Colli World Rally Team	WRC-2	(United Kingdom) Tom Cave	(United Kingdom) Craig Parry	Ford Fiesta R5	
47	(Finland) TGS Worldwide OU	WRC-2	(Finland) Teemu Suninen	(Finland) Mikko Markkula	Škoda Fabia S2000	
48	(Italy) Gianluca Linari	WRC-2	(Italy) Gianluca Linari	(Italy) Nicola Arena	Subaru Impreza WRX STi	

Icon	Class
WRC	WRC entries eligible to score manufacturer points
WRC	WRC entries ineligible to score manufacturer points
WRC-2	Registered to take part in WRC-2 championship

== Classification ==
=== Special stages ===
Day	Stage number	Stage name	Length	Stage winner	Car No.	Team	Time	Rally leader
13 Nov	SS1	(United Kingdom) Hafren 1	32.14 km	(France) Sébastien Ogier (France) Julien Ingrassia	1	(Germany) Volkswagen Motorsport	18:28.2	(France) Sébastien Ogier (France) Julien Ingrassia
13 Nov	SS2	(United Kingdom) Sweet Lamb 1	3.33 km	(France) Sébastien Ogier (France) Julien Ingrassia	1	(Germany) Volkswagen Motorsport	2:06.3	(France) Sébastien Ogier (France) Julien Ingrassia
13 Nov	SS3	(United Kingdom) Myherin 1	30.23 km	(France) Sébastien Ogier (France) Julien Ingrassia	1	(Germany) Volkswagen Motorsport	17:08.1	(France) Sébastien Ogier (France) Julien Ingrassia
13 Nov	SS4	(United Kingdom) Hafren 2	32.14 km	(United Kingdom) Kris Meeke (Republic of Ireland) Paul Nagle	3	(France) Citroën Total Abu Dhabi World Rally Team	18:56.8	(France) Sébastien Ogier (France) Julien Ingrassia
13 Nov	SS5	(United Kingdom) Sweet Lamb 2	3.33 km	(France) Sébastien Ogier (France) Julien Ingrassia	1	(Germany) Volkswagen Motorsport	2:09.4	(France) Sébastien Ogier (France) Julien Ingrassia
13 Nov	SS6	(United Kingdom) Myherin 2	30.23 km	(France) Sébastien Ogier (France) Julien Ingrassia	1	(Germany) Volkswagen Motorsport	17:15.8	(France) Sébastien Ogier (France) Julien Ingrassia
14 Nov	SS7	(United Kingdom) Gartheiniog 1	11.34 km	(Belgium) Thierry Neuville (Belgium) Nicolas Gilsoul	20	(Germany) Hyundai Motorsport N	7:03.4	(France) Sébastien Ogier (France) Julien Ingrassia
14 Nov	SS8	(United Kingdom) Dyfi 1	25.86 km	(Belgium) Thierry Neuville (Belgium) Nicolas Gilsoul	20	(Germany) Hyundai Motorsport N	15:10.1	(France) Sébastien Ogier (France) Julien Ingrassia
14 Nov	SS9	(United Kingdom) Gartheiniog 2	11.34 km	(Norway) Andreas Mikkelsen (Norway) Ola Fløene	9	(Germany) Volkswagen Motorsport II	7:14.4	(France) Sébastien Ogier (France) Julien Ingrassia
14 Nov	SS10	(United Kingdom) Dyfi 2	25.86 km	(France) Sébastien Ogier (France) Julien Ingrassia	1	(Germany) Volkswagen Motorsport	15:23.2	(France) Sébastien Ogier (France) Julien Ingrassia
14 Nov	SS11	(United Kingdom) Dyfnant 1	19.02 km	(France) Sébastien Ogier (France) Julien Ingrassia	1	(Germany) Volkswagen Motorsport	11:03.3	(France) Sébastien Ogier (France) Julien Ingrassia
14 Nov	SS12	(United Kingdom) Aberhirnant 1	13.91 km	(France) Sébastien Ogier (France) Julien Ingrassia	1	(Germany) Volkswagen Motorsport	7:44.7	(France) Sébastien Ogier (France) Julien Ingrassia
14 Nov	SS13	(United Kingdom) Chirk Castle	2.06 km	(Estonia) Ott Tänak (Estonia) Raigo Mõlder	6	(United Kingdom) M-Sport World Rally Team	1:33.3	(France) Sébastien Ogier (France) Julien Ingrassia
14 Nov	SS14	(United Kingdom) Dyfnant 2	19.02 km	(Norway) Andreas Mikkelsen (Norway) Ola Fløene	9	(Germany) Volkswagen Motorsport II	11:10.0	(France) Sébastien Ogier (France) Julien Ingrassia
14 Nov	SS15	(United Kingdom) Aberhirnant 2	13.91 km	(France) Sébastien Ogier (France) Julien Ingrassia	1	(Germany) Volkswagen Motorsport	7:50.5	(France) Sébastien Ogier (France) Julien Ingrassia
15 Nov	SS16	(United Kingdom) Brenig 1	10.64 km	(Finland) Jari-Matti Latvala (Finland) Miikka Anttila	2	(Germany) Volkswagen Motorsport	6:46.5	(France) Sébastien Ogier (France) Julien Ingrassia
15 Nov	SS17	(United Kingdom) Alwen	10.41 km	(Finland) Jari-Matti Latvala (Finland) Miikka Anttila	2	(Germany) Volkswagen Motorsport	5:44.0	(France) Sébastien Ogier (France) Julien Ingrassia
15 Nov	SS18	(United Kingdom) Great Orme	4.74 km	(Finland) Jari-Matti Latvala (Finland) Miikka Anttila	2	(Germany) Volkswagen Motorsport	2:38.8	(France) Sébastien Ogier (France) Julien Ingrassia
15 Nov	SS19	(United Kingdom) Brenig 2 (Power Stage)	10.64 km	(Finland) Jari-Matti Latvala (Finland) Miikka Anttila	2	(Germany) Volkswagen Motorsport	6:50.3	(France) Sébastien Ogier (France) Julien Ingrassia
