= Alltddu Halt railway station =

Disused railway station in Ceredigion, Wales

Coordinates: 52.25751°N 3.90323°W

Alltddu Halt

General information
- Location: Alltddu, Ceredigion; Wales
- Platforms: 1

Other information
- Status: Disused

History
- Original company: Great Western Railway

Key dates
- 23 September 1935: Opened
- 22 February 1965: Closed
Location

Alltddu Halt railway station served the hamlet of Allt-ddu, located between Lampeter and Aberystwyth on the Carmarthen Aberystwyth Line in the Welsh county of Ceredigion. The Ystwyth Trail, a multi-use rail trail, now passes the site on the trackbed of the former railway.

== History ==
Opened by the Great Western Railway, the station passed on to British Railways on nationalisation in 1948. It was then closed by the British Railways Board. Although proposed for closure in the Beeching Report serious damage due to flooding south of Aberystwyth closed that section in December 1964. The cost of repairs was deemed unjustified and led to the withdrawal of passenger services in February 1965, however milk trains continued to run from Carmarthen to nearby Pont Llanio until 1970.

Preceding station	Disused railways	Following station
Tregaron	Great Western Railway; Carmarthen to Aberystwyth Line	Strata Florida

== Sources ==
- Butt, R. V. J. (October 1995). The Directory of Railway Stations: details every public and private passenger station, halt, platform and stopping place, past and present (1st ed.). Sparkford: Patrick Stephens Ltd. ISBN 978-1-85260-508-7. OCLC 60251199. OL 11956311M.
- Jowett, Alan (2000). Jowett's Nationalised Railway Atlas (1st ed.). Penryn, Cornwall: Atlantic Transport Publishers. ISBN 978-0-906899-99-1. OCLC 228266687.
- Jowett, Alan (March 1989). Jowett's Railway Atlas of Great Britain and Ireland: From Pre-Grouping to the Present Day (1st ed.). Sparkford: Patrick Stephens Ltd. ISBN 978-1-85260-086-0. OCLC 22311137.
