= Ifan ab Owen Edwards =

Founder of Urdd Gobaith Cymru

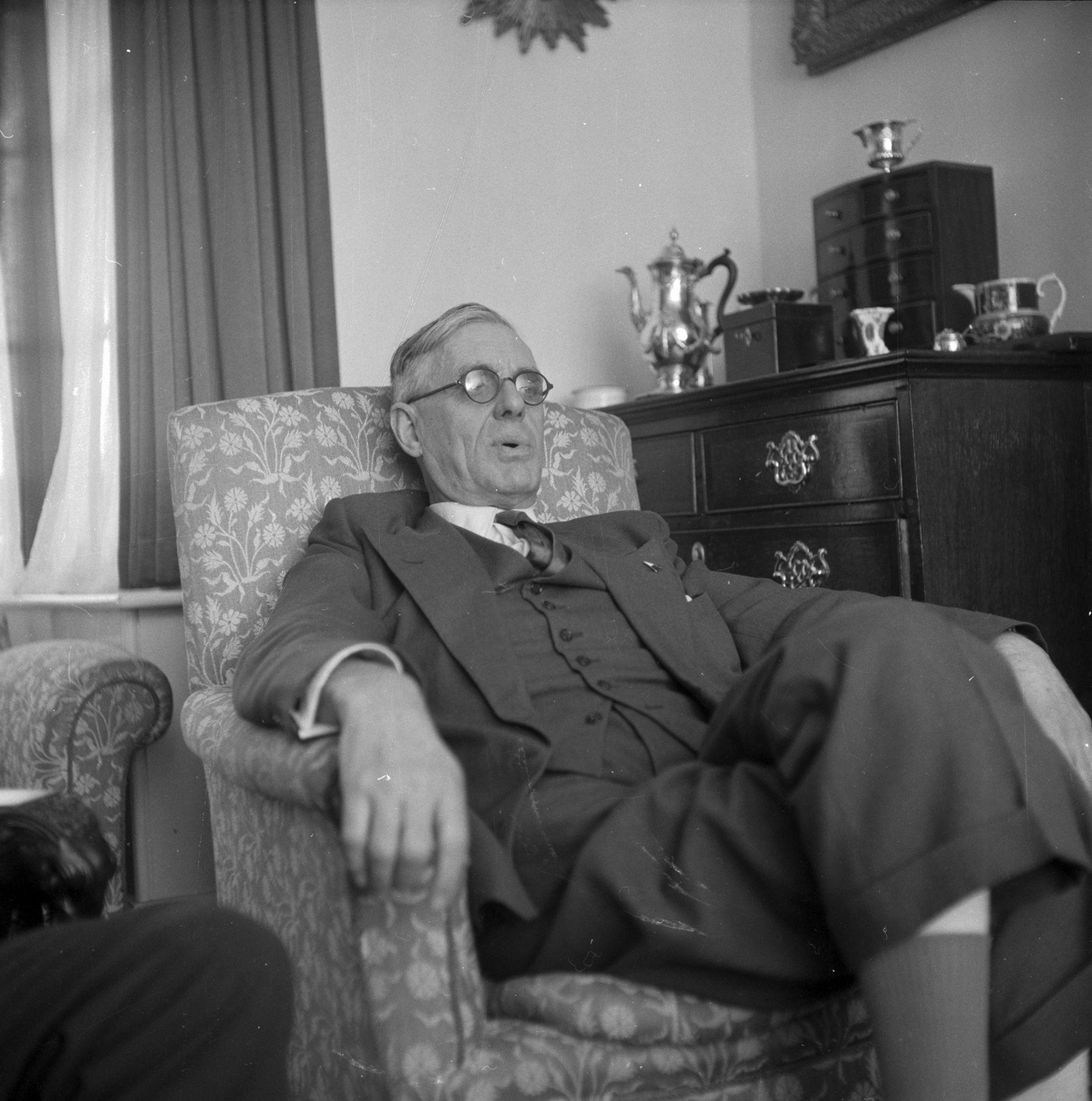
Edwards in 1961

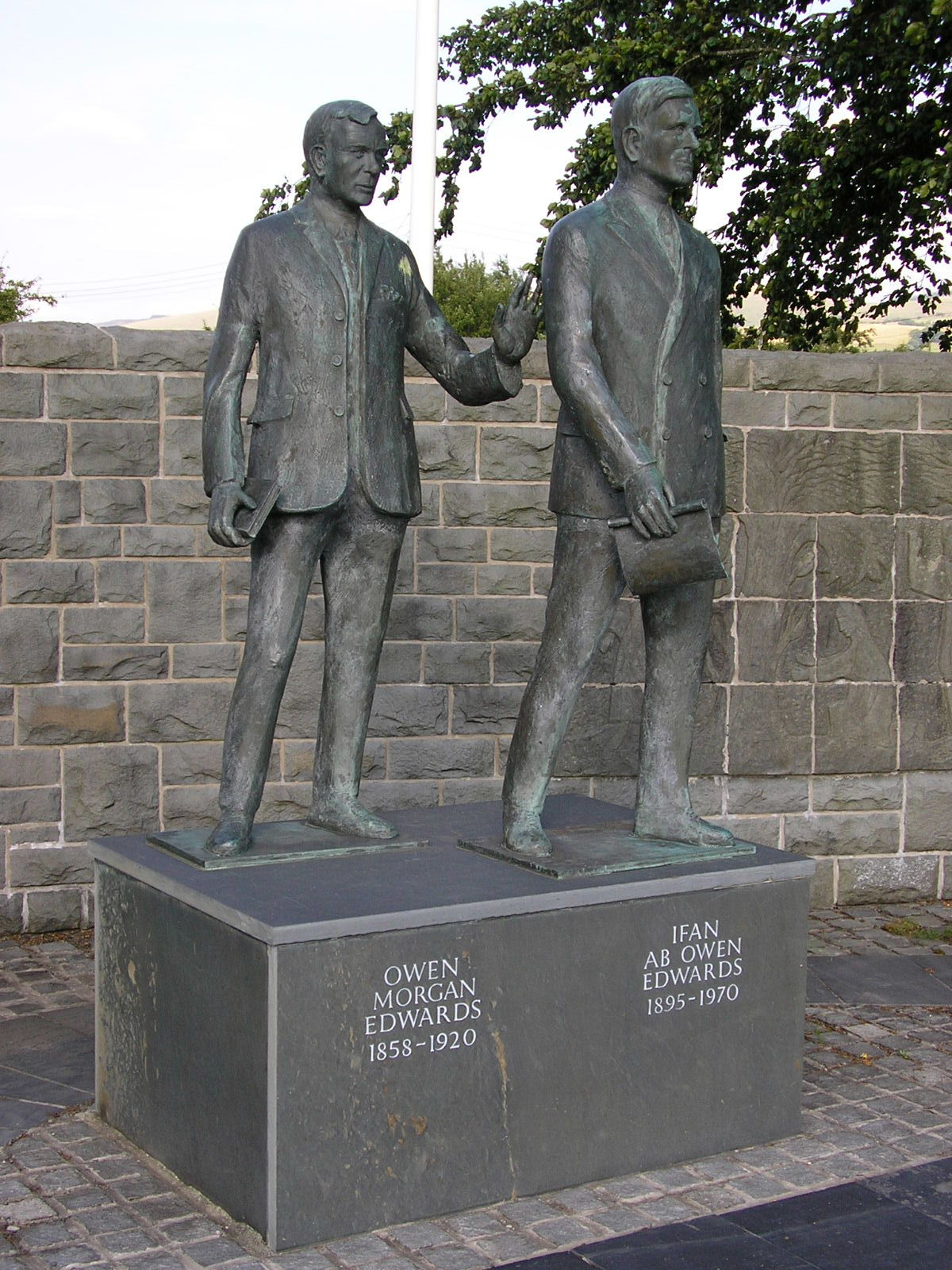
Statue by Jonah Jones of Owen Morgan Edwards and Ifan ab Owen Edwards in Llanuwchllyn

Sir Ifan ab Owen Edwards (25 July 1895 – 23 January 1970) was a Welsh academic, writer and film-maker, best known as the founder of Urdd Gobaith Cymru, the Welsh League of Youth.

He was born at Tremaran, Llanuwchllyn, Merionethshire, the son of Sir Owen Morgan Edwards, and was educated at Bala Grammar School and University of Wales, Aberystwyth. After military service with the Royal Army Service Corps on the Western Front during World War I, he studied at Lincoln College, Oxford, taking a degree in history. He worked as a teacher and lecturer from 1920 to 1948, when he gave up the profession to concentrate on his work for the Urdd.

In 1922, Edwards wrote a letter to the periodical Cymru'r Plant, which led to the founding of the Urdd, and the first Urdd recreational camp was held at Llanuwchllyn in 1928, under his direction. The first Urdd local branch was founded in Treuddyn. It was gradually followed by more permanent camps and residential centres. In partnership with J. Ellis Williams, he made the first Welsh language sound film, The Quarryman. In 1947 he was knighted in recognition of his youth work, and the Urdd had his portrait painted by Alfred Janes in 1956. He was a director of Television Wales and the West and encouraged the making of television programmes in Welsh. His son, Owen Edwards, would become the first chief executive of S4C.

== Works ==
- A catalogue of Star Chamber proceedings relating to Wales (1929) (ed.)
- Yr Urdd 1922-43 (1943)
- Clych Atgof (1921) (edited version of his father's autobiography)
