= Tynreithyn =

Village in Ceredigion, Wales

Coordinates: 52.242571°N 3.960319°W

- Location within Ceredigion
- OS grid reference: SN 6625 6230
  - Cardiff: 62.4 mi (100.4 km)
  - London: 171.2 mi (275.5 km)
- Community: Tregaron
- Principal area: Ceredigion
- Country: Wales
- Sovereign state: United Kingdom
- Post town: Tregaron
- Postcode district: SY25
- Police: Dyfed-Powys
- Fire: Mid and West Wales
- Ambulance: Welsh
- UK Parliament: Ceredigion Preseli
- Senedd Cymru – Welsh Parliament: Ceredigion

Tynreithyn is a hamlet in the community of Tregaron, Ceredigion, Wales. It is also spelt as Tynreithin, Tyn'reithin, Ty'n-Yr-Eithin or Ty'n-yr-eithyn.

== See also ==
- List of localities in Wales by population
