= William Evans (cardiologist) =

Welsh cardiologist and publisher

William Evans F.R.C.P.(Lond.), Hon. D.Sc.(Wales) (24 November 1895 – 20 September 1988) was a distinguished Harley Street cardiologist. He was a grandson of "the Welsh Swagman", Joseph Jenkins, whose voluminous Australian diaries over 25 years (1869-1894) he edited and published as excerpts in 1975.

== Early life ==
Evans was born in a Welsh farmhouse, 'Tyndomen', near Tregaron, Ceredigion, the son of Ebenezer Evans and Elinor (Nell) Jenkins. He had two surviving older siblings, Elizabeth and Joseph, and two others who died as infants. His mother was a daughter of Joseph Jenkins, the "Welsh Swagman", who entrusted to her his manuscript Australian diaries. It was planned that young William would enter the Church of England ministry, but this was abandoned around the time of the disestablishment of the church in 1920. His autobiography relates how he worked as a bank clerk from 1912 and enlisted for military service in 1914, serving with the Buffs and as an officer of the Lancashire Fusiliers at Ypres and Passchendaele Ridge, 1916–1918.

== Medical career ==
After leaving France in September 1919, William Evans studied for University of London matriculation at the Aberystwyth University College and commenced medical studies at the London Hospital in 1920. He graduated MB BS in 1925 and MD in 1927. He was appointed house physician to Sir John Parkinson at the hospital, later becoming his chief assistant in the Heart Department. He also assisted Lord Dawson of Penn in use of the electrocardiograph, with which he once favourably determined the disputed state of health of prime minister Stanley Baldwin. In 1959 he was appointed to the honorific post of High Sheriff of Cardiganshire.

Evans became an international authority and lecturer on diseases of the heart during his long career, from which he retired in 1967. He published several books and a large number of papers (an exhaustive list of which is appended to his autobiography).

== Private life ==
In 1940, at age 45, Dr Evans married Christina Downie (then aged 56). There were no children and Christina died in 1964. In retirement, he ultimately settled at Bryndomen, near Tregaron, and overlooking the Domen (burial mound) close to the Teifi River, where he was known as "Wil Blocks" because of a substantial concrete-block wall around his residence. He died on 20 September 1988, aged 92, at Withybush Hospital, Haverfordwest.

== Bibliography ==
- A Student's Handbook of Clinical Electrocardiology Lewis, London 1934
- Cardiology Butterworth, London 1948
- Cardioscopy Butterworth, London 1952
- Cardiography Butterworth, London 1954
- Disease of the Heart and Arteries Livingstone, London 1964
- Diary of a Welsh Swagman Macmillan, Melbourne 1975, reprinted by Sun Books 1977–99

== See also ==
List of Welsh medical pioneers
