= Owen Edwards (broadcaster) =

Welsh broadcaster

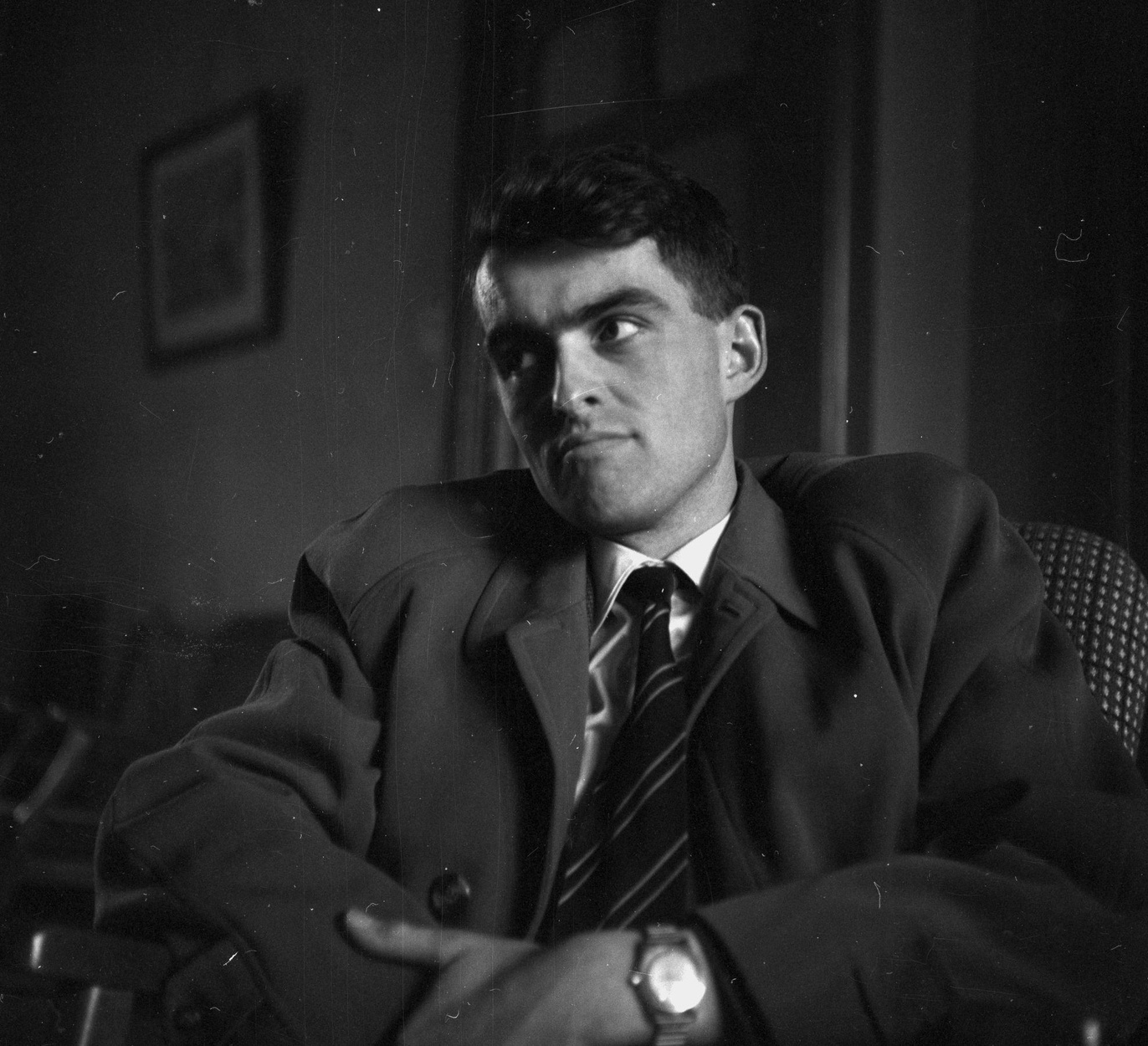
Owen Edwards in 1961

Owen Edwards (26 December 1933 – 30 August 2010) was a Welsh broadcaster, and the first chief executive of the Welsh-language television channel S4C, the fourth television channel in Wales, a post he held from 1981-89.

He was a presenter on the early Welsh-language television programme Dewch i Mewn during the 1950s. From 1961 to 1966 he presented Heddiw, the BBC's early evening Welsh-language news magazine programme.

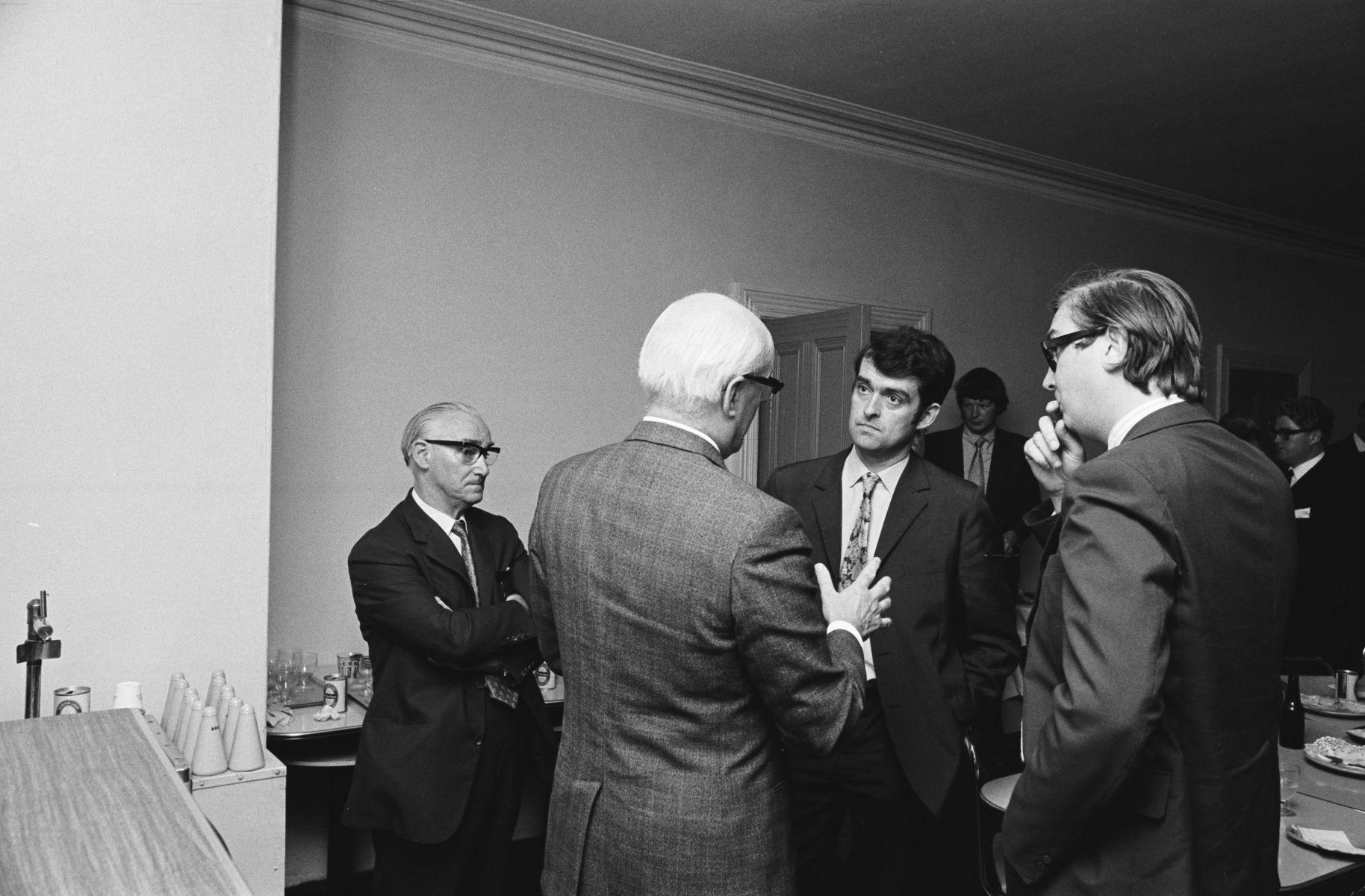
Edwards at BBC Bangor studios in 1971

== Life ==
Edwards was born in Aberystwyth; his father was Sir Ifan ab Owen Edwards, founder of Urdd Gobaith Cymru (Welsh League of Youth); Owen Edwards' grandfather was the historian and literary scholar Sir Owen Morgan Edwards. He was educated at Ysgol Gymraeg Aberystwyth, and went on to Leighton Park School in Reading. He later studied at Lincoln College, Oxford.

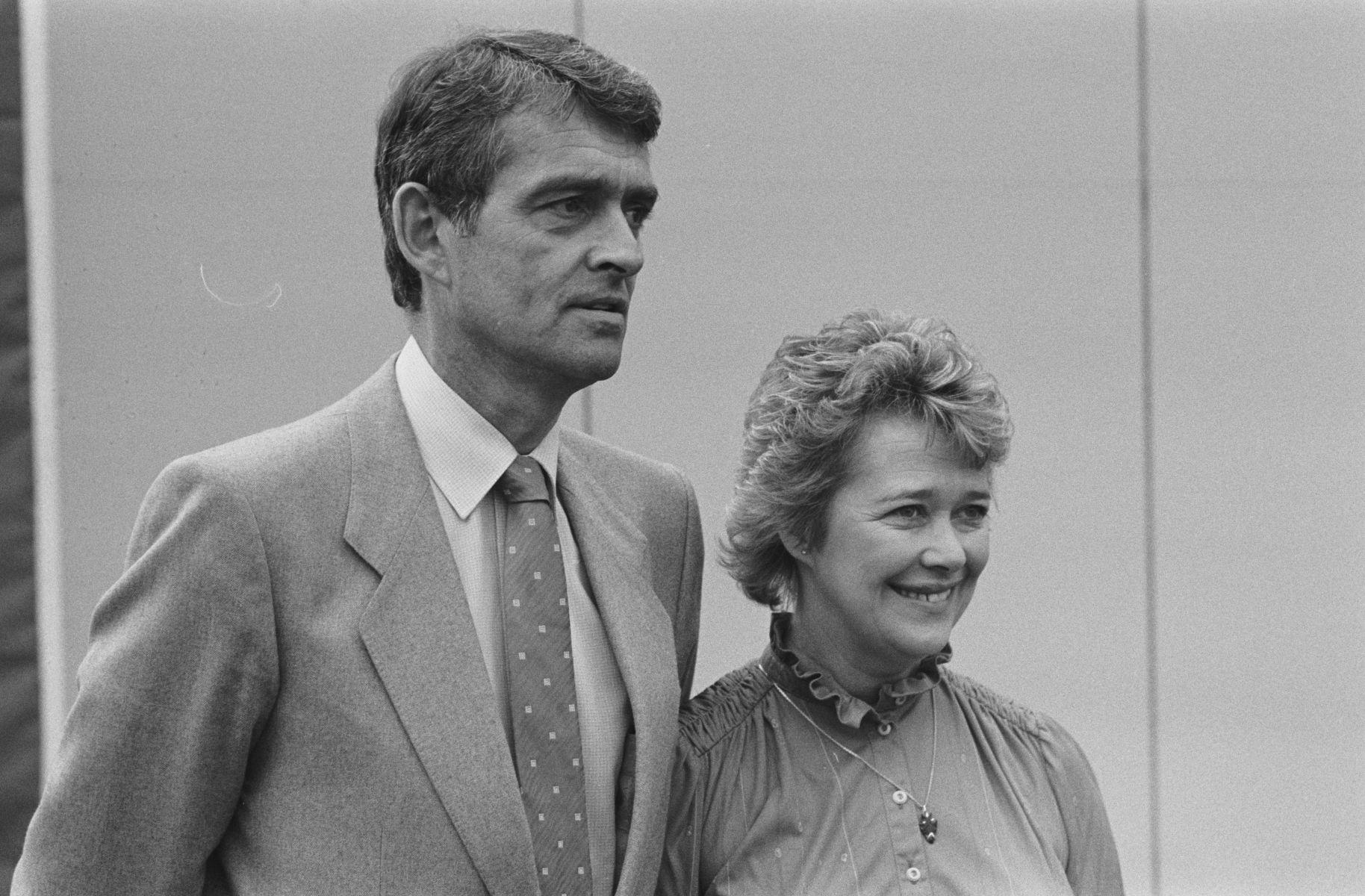
Edwards with Shan Emlyn in 1984

In 1958, he married Shan Emlyn; the couple had two daughters before the marriage was dissolved in 1994. In 1994, he married his second wife, Rosemary Allen, who survived him. He was appointed Programme Organiser with BBC Wales in 1967, Head of Programmes in 1970 and Controller in 1974. His seven years as Controller coincided with the rapid development of the BBC's output in Wales, in both Welsh and English, so that by the mid-1970s it was producing some 1,500 hours of radio a year and 650 hours of television, in both languages.

He was named head of BBC Wales in 1974, and held the post for several years until moving to take on the position of head of S4C during the planning phase for the new channel. He maintained an interest in broadcasting as Chairman of the Association for Film and Television in the Celtic Countries. He was awarded the Cyfrwng Award in 2008.
