= Ysgol Henry Richard =

Coordinates: 52.21848873252584°N 3.937975420150894°W

- Tregaron, SY25 6HG; Wales

Information
- Type: All-age
- Local authority: Ceredigion County Council
- Specialist: Bilingual
- Headteacher: Dorian Pugh
- Gender: Male and Female
- Age: 3 to 16
- Enrolment: 381 (2024)
- Website: tregaron.ceredigion.sch.uk

Ysgol Henry Richard is a bilingual middle school for pupils aged 3–16 in Ceredigion, Wales. The school is a product of the amalgamation of Ysgol Llanddewi Brefi, Ysgol Gynradd Tregaron and Ysgol Uwchradd Tregaron.

The school is categorized linguistically by Welsh Government as a category 2B school, meaning that at least 80% of subjects (except Welsh and English) are taught through the medium of Welsh but are also taught through the medium of English. 57% come from Welsh-speaking homes and 88% of pupils are taught through the medium of Welsh.
