= Harry Price (Royal Navy seaman) =

Royal Navy sailor

- Born: 1877; Birmingham, England
- Died: June 1965 (aged 87–88); Devon
- Military career
- Allegiance: United Kingdom
- Branch: Royal Navy
- Service years: 1893–1919
- Rank: Petty officer
- Conflicts: First World War
- Awards: Distinguished Service Medal

Harry Price DSM (1877 – June 1965) was an ordinary seaman of the Royal Navy. He became a well travelled figure, producing accounts and drawings of his travels, and publishing his account of the Royal cruise he was part of aboard the temporarily commissioned HMS Ophir in 1901. He served on a number of ships during the First World War, and later took up a number of occupations.

== Family and early life ==
Price was born in Birmingham in 1877, the son of parents who had moved from Wales. His father was a master builder in the city. His family produced a minor poet, and a member of the Royal Academy. Price and his family were also keen anglers and became expert coarse fishers, being dubbed the 'champion fishing family of Birmingham'. Price's artistic ability became pronounced and eventually noted. He was sent to the Birmingham School of Art, progressing rapidly through the school until he was told that his natural talent was such that they could not teach him anything. Dissatisfied with life in Birmingham, which he termed 'the land of bricks and mortar', he left home in 1893 and joined the Royal Navy. He only returned to Birmingham to attend his mother's funeral.

== Royal Navy life ==
Price joined the navy's training establishment HMS Britannia, based at Devonport. He was a keen walker, taking with him his fishing rod and paints. During this time he discovered the village of Drewsteignton, and became so enamoured that he decided to settle there after his retirement from the navy. He was a keen patriot, but had joined the navy with the intention of 'seeing the world', and often rebelled against instances of harsh naval discipline. He briefly led a minor mutiny, but after it began to take on 'ugly proportions', he put an end to it. The naval authorities decided to pardon him. He was a skilled recruit however and rapidly rose through the ranks during his time at Britannia. This good record led to his selection as part of the crew for the planned royal cruise of George, Duke of Cornwall and York, later King George V, and Mary, Duchess of Cornwall and York. The couple were to sail to Australia to open the Parliament. On the way they were to call at numerous ports of the British Empire, and return to Britain by way of Canada. It was the most ambitious royal tour undertaken to that date.

Price, by now a Petty Officer was with the tour from February to November 1901, and made a careful record, later published posthumously in 1980 as The Royal Tour 1901, or the Cruise of H.M.S. Ophir; Being a Lower Deck Account of their Royal Highnesses, The Duke and Duchess of Cornwall and York's Voyage Around the British Empire. The book was illustrated with Price's own sketches and paintings, which recorded aspects of life on board ship during the cruise, as well as the reception at the various ports of call, details of colonial life and the interactions of warships of many different nationalities encountered on the voyage. The voyage covered over 45,000 miles, but with the exception of Port Said, the ports called at were all part of the British Empire.

Price remained in the Navy until 1907, when he became part of the Royal Naval Reserve. He was mobilised on 2 August 1914 with the outbreak of the First World War. He eventually served on five different ships, three of which, including the battleships HMS Ocean and HMS Majestic, were sunk in the space of nine months. He spent 14 hours in the water after the sinking of Ocean before he was picked up by a destroyer. He was an excellent swimmer though, and having been born with a caul, he declared 'I could never drown.' He survived the war, receiving the Distinguished Service Medal, and was demobilised in March 1919.

== Later life ==
Price settled in Drewsteignton and became a talented naturalist, eventually developing a substantial collection of birds' eggs and butterflies. He became a freelance collector for Watkins and Doncaster, of The Strand. Through this he came to be associated with Richard Kearton, who together with his brother Cherry Kearton, were pioneers in the development of bird photography. Price too then took up bird photography. He resumed his fishing, writing a number of books on the subject, including one on carp fishing. He was also an expert gardener, and on occasion sent produce to be exhibited at the Royal Horticultural Society's shows. He also grew tobacco, for he was a moderately heavy pipe smoker, curing it using a method he had developed from observing the tobacco industries at Havana and Rhodesia.

He remained an active painter, and also modelled ships, including a fully rigged model of HMS Impregnable. He had made a model ship during his time in the navy, which he used to smuggle tobacco out of the dockyard. He took up wood carving when over 70 years old. He was left disabled following a stroke at the age of 83, and died in hospital in June 1965 at the age of 88.

One of his mechanical models of Uncle Tom Cobley and the Grey MareWhen is kept on display at Widecombe St Pancras Church.Inspired by the Devon folk song Widecombe Fair. The automation was exhibited at Widecombe Fair in 1959 and again in 1960. The horse now opens Widecombe Fair after being donated by the Price family
