= Tregaron =

Market town in Ceredigion, Wales

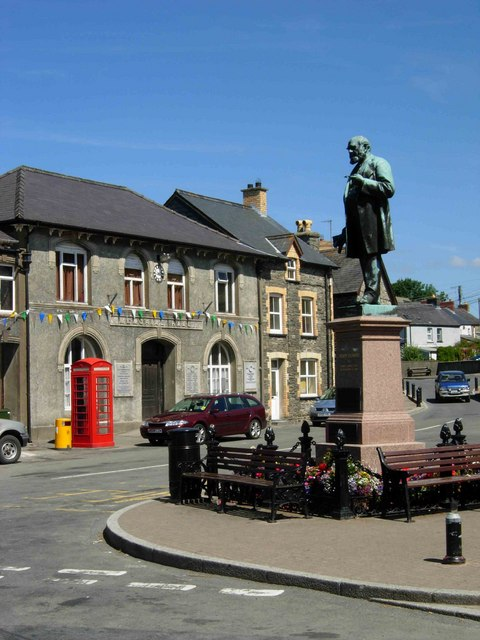
- Henry Richard's statue and the memorial hall in Market Square

- Location within Ceredigion
- Area: 86 km^{2} (33 sq mi)
- Population: 1,213 (2011)
  - Density: 14/km^{2} (36/sq mi)
- OS grid reference: SN679597
- Principal area: Ceredigion
- Country: Wales
- Sovereign state: United Kingdom
- Post town: TREGARON
- Postcode district: SY25
- Dialling code: 01974
- Police: Dyfed-Powys
- Fire: Mid and West Wales
- Ambulance: Welsh
- UK Parliament: Ceredigion Preseli
- Senedd Cymru – Welsh Parliament: Ceredigion Penfro
- List of places UK Wales Ceredigion 52.21962°N 3.93517°W Community map: Map of the community

Tregaron (Welsh: [treˈɡaːrɔn] "town of St Caron") is an ancient market town in Ceredigion, Wales. It is sited astride the River Brenig, a tributary of the River Teifi, and is 11 miles (18 km) north-east of Lampeter. According to the 2011 Census, the population of the ward of Tregaron was 1,213 and 67% of the population could speak Welsh; Tregaron is a community covering 33 square miles (85 km^{2}); two-thirds of the population were born in Wales. The community contains the hamlet Tynreithyn.

== History ==
Tregaron received its royal charter as a town in 1292. It owes its origin and growth to its central location in the upper Teifi Valley. It was the market town for the scattered agricultural communities in the broad, fertile countryside to the south and the rich landowners with extensive holdings in the uplands to the east, the home of many sheep and few people. To the north was Cors Caron which was a fertile land when drained, and to the west a hilly region with self-sufficient farmers on smallholdings of a few acres. These people all converged on Tregaron for the weekly market and the annual fair, Ffair Garon, where the sale of poultry, pigs, cattle and horses took place. The charter for the yearly fair was granted by Edward I in the 13th century. Sheep fairs were held in May and June and two hiring fairs took place in November. A large number of taverns and inns in the town catered for the influx of country folk to these events.

In the middle of the 18th century, Matthew Evans kept an inn in the town. He had two sons and a daughter who were celebrated robbers and collectively known as Plant Mat ('Matthew's children' in English). They lived for several years in a cave near Devils Bridge which still bears their name. They terrorized the district and would give to their friends a glove to act as a passport and identify them to their brethren. It was difficult to apprehend the trio because of the narrowness of the entrance to the cave which made it impossible to storm. After several years of success, they committed a murder and, eventually being taken, were sentenced to death and executed.

Tregaron was a main gathering place for the drovers who, before the advent of rail transport, herded large numbers of cattle, sheep and even geese hundreds of miles to the markets of southeast England. Many Tregaron men were drovers and accumulated considerable wealth in the process. They acted as news carriers and unofficial postmen and some were adept at avoiding tollgates.

The Tregaron area had a number of water-driven woollen mills and was a centre for the manufacture of hosiery. Woollen socks were knitted at home by men, women and children and sold at the market, often to dealers who resold them in the industrial valleys of South Wales.

== Culture and community ==
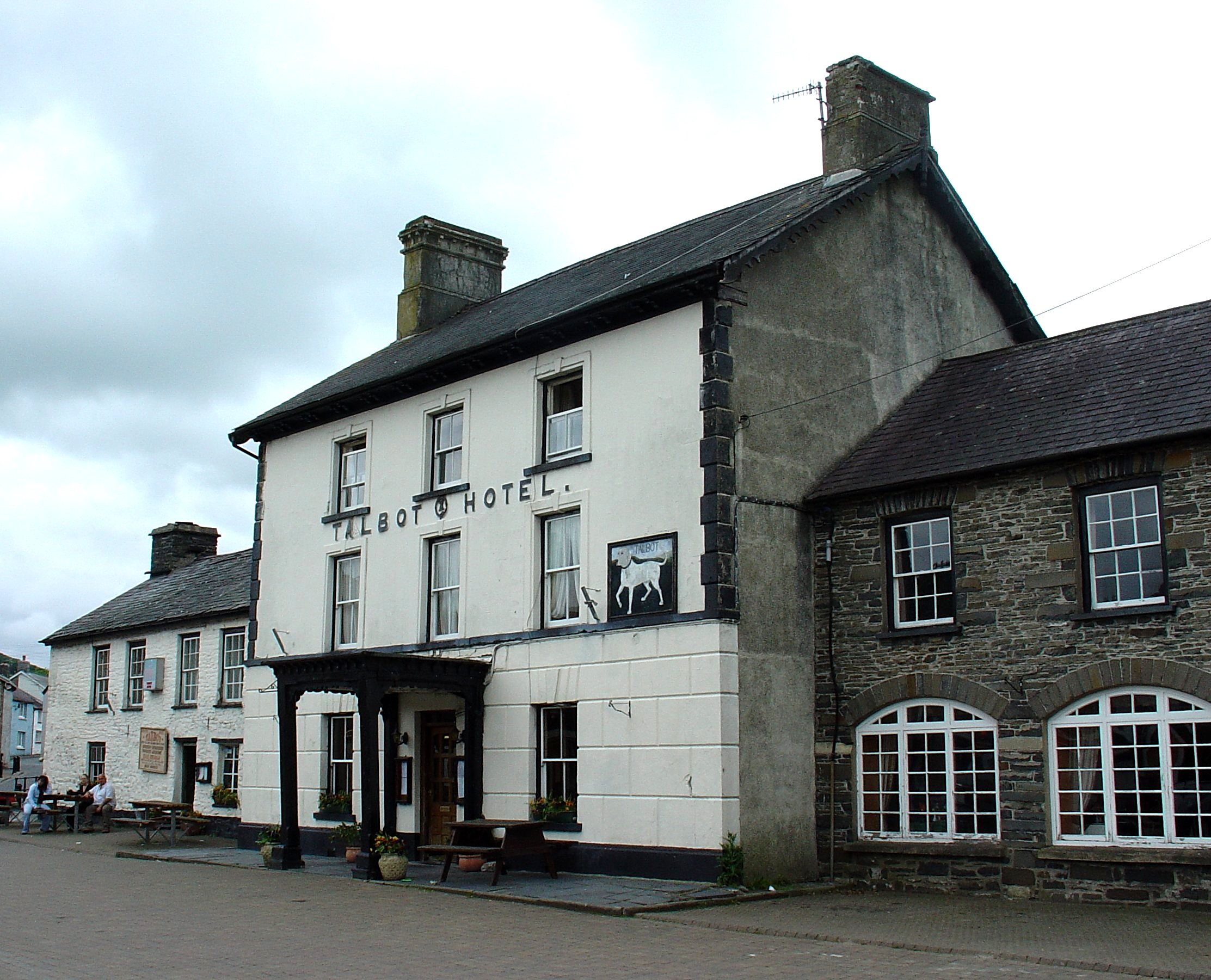
The Talbot Hotel

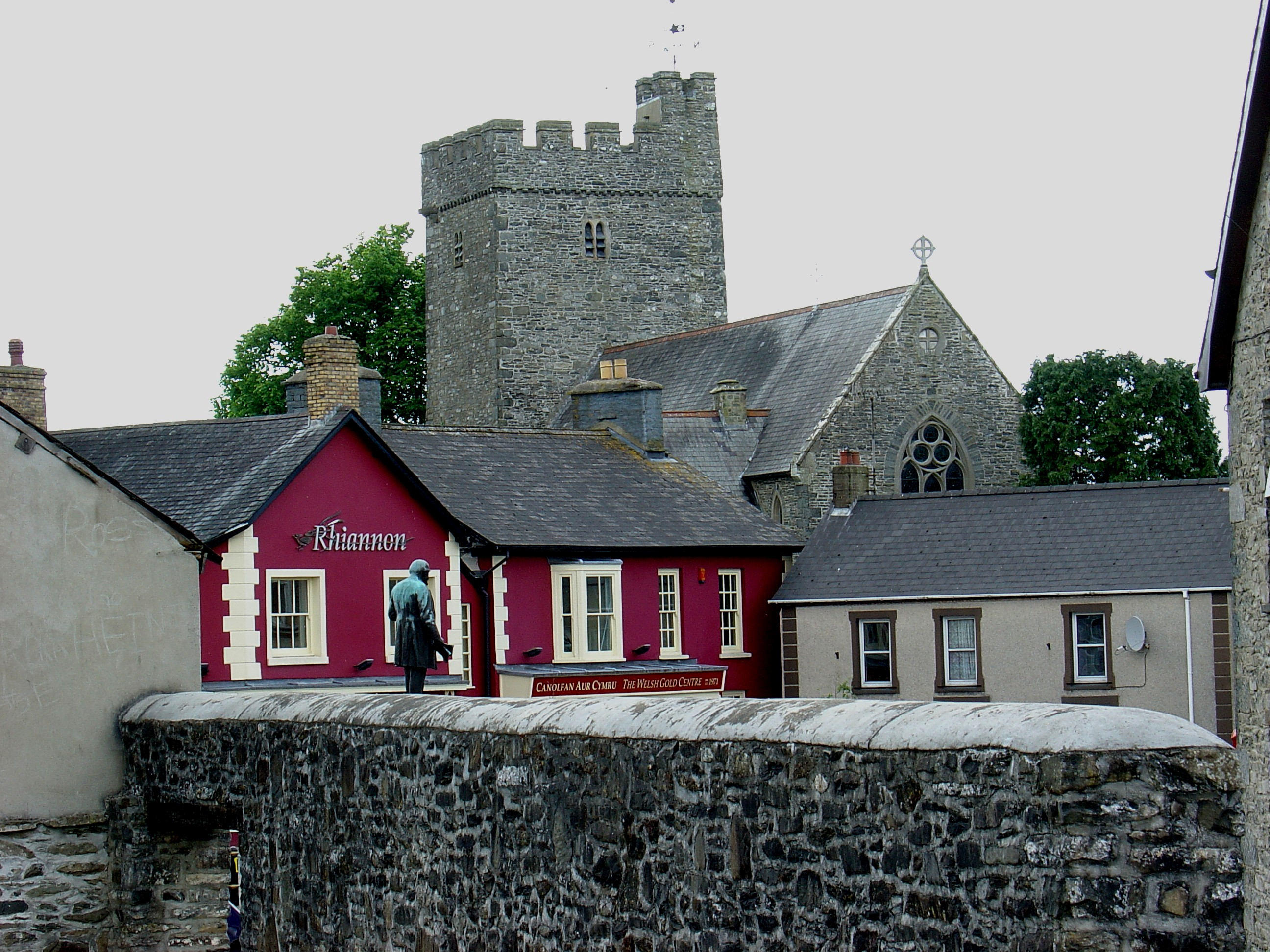
St Caron's church

The church is dedicated to St Caron. He was a man of lowly origins but "his courage and generous deportment obtained him the sovereignty in Wales: he made war against the Romans, reigned seven years and was buried in Tregarron". He is almost certainly the same person as Carausius (Roman name) who took power in Britain in 286 and was assassinated in 293 by Allectus (also see Carausian Revolt). According to Geoffrey of Monmouth in the translation from Welsh "there was a young man of the name of Caron, of a British family, but of low degree, who... went to Rome, and solicited the Senate to grant him permission and aid to protect the sea coasts of Britain... [He] proposed to the Britons that they should make him king... Allectus with three legions... overpowered him..." An early Christian stone slab bearing the name Carausius and the Chi Rho symbol is preserved in Penmachno. The church has a tower and stands on a rocky eminence. It consists of a simple nave and chancel.

Other notable buildings in the town include the 13th-century Talbot Hotel, which supposedly has an elephant buried in its grounds. The remote chapel Soar y mynydd is close to Tregaron. In March, 1977, a cottage near Tregaron was one target of an Operation Julie police raid in which vast quantities of the drug LSD were seized.

Nearby Cors Caron (Tregaron Bog), is known for its adders, buzzards, red kites, and polecats. The River Brenig is noted for its brown trout and eels. The river has been the subject of dredging and flood-protection works to provide 1-in-100-year flood protection to the town and improve the environment for wildlife along a stretch of river.

=== Music and the arts ===
An annual eisteddfod is held in the town each September, drawing performers from all parts of Wales and beyond. Eisteddfodau have been conducted at Tregaron for a century or more. The Caron Male Voice Choir was formed in 1969 and has performed in Europe and America as well as the UK.

The National Eisteddfod was held in Tregaron in 2022 after being postponed in 2020 and 2021 because of the coronavirus pandemic.

=== Sport ===
The town holds an annual festival of harness racing in August, which attracts racegoers from across the UK; this was started in 1980 by the Tregaron Trotting Club. A race day is now held early in May each year.

The Tregaron Rugby Football Club plays in Division Two West C of the Welsh Rugby Union, having won promotion from Division 3 in 2015.

An association football team, Tregaron Turfs F.C., plays in the Central Wales Football League Southern Division.

== Transport ==
The nearest National Rail station is Aberystwyth, which facilitates services to Shrewsbury and Birmingham on the Cambrian Line.

Tregaron once had its own railway station. In 1860, government approval to subsidise the construction of a railway from Manchester to Milford Haven was granted. At the urging of local people, led by David Davies and supported by Joseph Jenkins, capital was subscribed for a station at Tregaron. The Pencader–Lampeter section was completed in January 1866. The grand opening of the entire line was held the following year at Aberystwyth on 12 August 1867, providing a boost to the economy of the town. In 1965, Tregaron's train service was withdrawn and the station closed, after the line was badly damaged by flooding south of Aberystwyth.

The town is served by several bus routes, which connect to Aberystwyth, Carmarthen and Lampeter; there are more sporadic services to other neighbouring small towns and villages. There are no buses in the evenings or on Sundays and bank holidays. Services are operated by First Cymru, Mid Wales Travel and Evans Coaches.

== Education ==
The Tregaron district has a 'through-age' school (ages 3 to 16 years), Ysgol Henry Richard, administered by Ceredigion County Council.

== Notable people ==
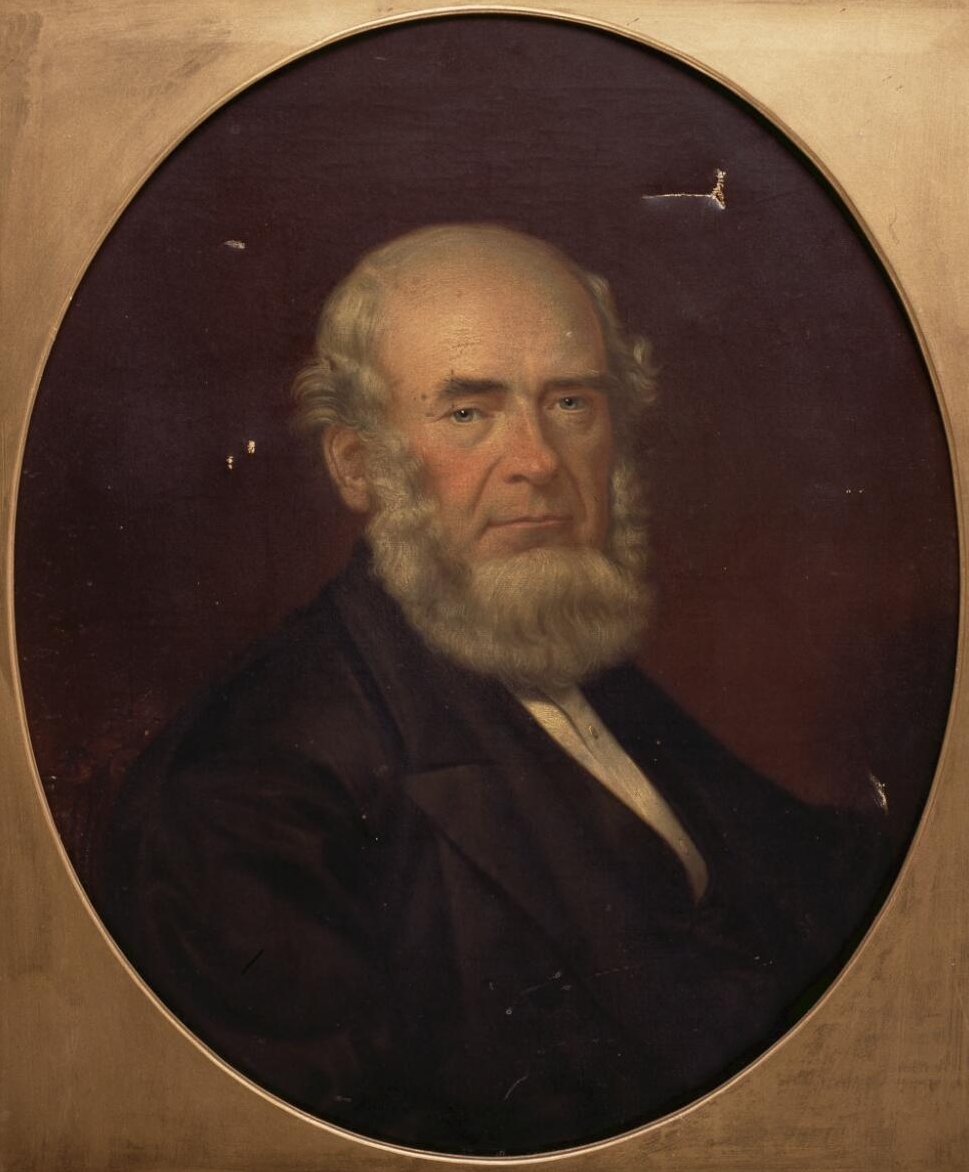
Henry Richard, 1870

- Twm Siôn Cati (ca.1530 - ca.1609), the Welsh Robin Hood
- Evan Shelby (1720-1794), American frontiersman
- Henry Richard (1812–1888), the Apostle of Peace, an MP, minister and secretary of the Peace Society
- Joseph Jenkins (1818-1898), the Welsh Swagman; aged over 50, he deserted his home and large family to seek his fortune in Australia
- William Evans (1895–1988), a Harley Street cardiologist, grandson of the Welsh Swagman
- Annie Davies (1910–1970), radio and TV producer
- Ogwyn Davies (1925–2015), artist, lived and worked in Tregaron
- Sir David Nicholas (1930–2022), a British broadcast journalist, ITN editor-in-chief
- Caradog Jones (born 1962), a Welsh mountaineer; born and raised in Pontrhydfendigaid, a village nearby

== Twinning ==
Tregaron is twinned with Plouvien, in Finistère, France.
