= 1984 in Wales =

- Centuries: 18th; 19th; 20th; 21st
- Decades: 1960s; 1970s; 1980s; 1990s; 2000s
- See also: List of years in Wales; Timeline of Welsh history 1984 in The United Kingdom England Scotland Elsewhere

This article is about the particular significance of the year 1984 to Wales and its people.

== Incumbents ==
- Secretary of State for Wales – Nicholas Edwards
- Archbishop of Wales – Derrick Childs, Bishop of Monmouth
- Archdruid of the National Eisteddfod of Wales
  - Jâms Nicholas (outgoing)
  - Elerydd (incoming)

== Events ==
- 2 March – Carmarthen MP Dr Roger Thomas announces his resignation, having been prosecuted for importuning.
- 12 March – The miners' strike begins, with a solid turn out from all NUM mines in Wales.
- 31 March - The Guildford Crescent Baths close in Cardiff after 122 years, despite a campaign to keep them open.
- 3 May – At the Cynon Valley by-election brought about by the death of MP Ioan Lyonel Evans, Ann Clwyd retains the seat for Labour with an increased majority.
- 19 July – The Lleyn Peninsula earthquake, which strikes the Llŷn Peninsula at 06:56 UTC (07:56 BST), measuring 5.4 on the Richter scale, is the largest known onshore earthquake to occur in the UK since instrumental measurements began.
- 4 October – Dafydd Wigley resigns as leader of Plaid Cymru for domestic reasons.
- 30 November – Taxi driver David Wilkie is killed when a concrete block is dropped onto his car as he drives a strikebreaker to work on the M4 motorway. Dean Hancock and Russell Shankland of Rhymney are later convicted of murder.
- 3 December – First McDonald's hamburger fast food restaurant in Wales opens in Cardiff.
- date unknown
  - Sam Edwards becomes Cavendish Professor of Physics at Cambridge.
  - Clive Sinclair's C5 electric vehicle is manufactured at the Hoover works in Merthyr Tydfil.
  - Border Breweries (Wrexham) ceases to brew in Wales.
  - Creation of Cadw: Welsh Historic Monuments Executive Agency.

== Arts and literature ==
=== Awards ===
- Griff Rhys Jones wins the Laurence Olivier Theatre Award for Best Comedy Performance for his role in Charley's Aunt.
- National Eisteddfod of Wales (held in Lampeter)
- National Eisteddfod of Wales: Chair – Aled Rhys Wiliam
- National Eisteddfod of Wales: Crown – John Roderick Rees
- National Eisteddfod of Wales: Prose Medal – John Idris Owen
- Gwobr Goffa Daniel Owen – Richard Cyril Hughes, Castell Cyfaddawd

=== New books ===
==== English language ====
- Duncan Bush – Aquarium
- Hywel Francis – Miners Against Fascism: Wales and the Spanish Civil War
- Sian James – Dragons and Roses
- Mike Jenkins – Empire of Smoke
- Robert Minhinnick – Life Sentences
- Leslie Thomas – In My Wildest Dreams

==== Welsh language ====
- Gwynn ap Gwilym – Gwales
- Geraint H. Jenkins – Hanes Cymru yn y Cyfnod Modern Cynnar: 1530–1760
- Alun Jones – Oed Rhyw Addewid
- Gerwyn Williams – Colli cyswllt

=== Music ===
- Ar Log IV
- The Alarm – Declaration (debut studio album)
- Icons of Filth – Onward Christian Soldiers
- Shakin' Stevens records "Teardrops" with Hank Marvin on guitar.
- Phil Campbell joins Motörhead.
- First Brecon Jazz Festival staged.

== Film ==
- Ray Milland makes his last film appearance in The Sea Serpent.
- Sian Phillips stars in Dune.
- Kevin Allen makes his big screen debut in The Man Who Shot Christmas.

=== Welsh-language films ===
- None

== Broadcasting ==
- Gareth Gwenlan becomes Head of Comedy at the BBC.

=== English-language television ===
- The District Nurse starring Nerys Hughes

== Sport ==
- Football – Ian Rush becomes the first Welshman to win the European Golden Boot award.
- BBC Wales Sports Personality of the Year – Ian Rush
- Horse racing – Neil Doughty wins the Grand National on Hallo Dandy.

== Births ==
- 27 February – Rhys Williams, athlete
- 9 March – Owain Wyn Evans, broadcast presenter
- 11 March – Tom James, Olympic gold medal-winning rower
- 22 June – Arron Davies, footballer
- 23 June – Duffy, singer
- 31 July – Craig Stiens, footballer
- 14 August – Rob Davies, table tennis player
- 15 September – Prince Harry, son of the Prince and Princess of Wales (Charles and Diana)
- 20 September – Byron Anthony, footballer
- 15 October – Owain Tudur Jones, footballer
- 24 November – Matthew Mason, cricketer
- date unknown – Gwawr Edwards, soprano

== Deaths ==
- 4 January – Enoch Jenkins, sports shooter, 91
- 11 January – Gwyn Thomas, rugby player, 91
- 14 January – Ivan Lloyd-Phillips, colonial administrator, 73
- 26 January – Nathan Rocyn-Jones, doctor, international rugby player and President of the WRU, 81
- 10 February – Ioan Evans, politician, 56
- 11 April – John Lloyd Thomas, clergyman and teacher, 76
- 15 April – Tommy Cooper, comedian, 63 (heart attack on stage)
- 21 April – Wilf Hughes, cricketer, 73
- 8 May – David Williams, geologist, 85
- 20 May – Meredith Thomas, flying ace, 91
- 13 June – David Evans, microbiologist, 74
- 18 June – Idris Foster, academic, 72
- 22 June – Dill Jones, jazz pianist, 60
- 29 June – Seiriol Evans, clergyman and writer, 89
- 6 July – Denys Val Baker, British writer and promoter of Celtic culture, 66
- 30 July – Peter Jones, surgeon, 67
- 5 August – Richard Burton, actor, 58 (brain haemorrhage)
- 17 August – Mostyn Thomas, operatic baritone, 88
- 27 August – Amabel Williams-Ellis, writer, 90
- 9 September – Margaret Phillips, actress, 61
- 23 September – Daniel Granville West, politician, 80
- 12 October – Sir Anthony Berry, politician and son of Gomer Berry, 1st Viscount Kemsley, 59 (killed in Brighton hotel bombing)
- 26 October – Seaborne Davies, lawyer and politician, 80
- 18 November – Thomas Jones, Baron Maelor, politician, 86
- 11 December (in Hendon) – Will Paynter, miners' leader, 81
- date unknown – Arthur Fear, operatic bass-baritone

== See also ==
- 1984 in Northern Ireland
