= Umar Farooq Ahmed =

Former Danish cricketer

Personal information
- Full name: Umar Farooq Ahmed
- Born: 4 January 1979 (age 47); Denmark
- Batting: Unknown
- Bowling: Slow left-arm orthodox

Domestic team information
- Years: Team
- 2003: Denmark

Career statistics
Competition	List A
Matches	1
Runs scored	12
Batting average	12.00
100s/50s	–/–
Top score	12
Balls bowled	60
Wickets	–
Bowling average	–
5 wickets in innings	–
10 wickets in match	–
Best bowling	–
Catches/stumpings	–/–
- Source: Cricinfo, 15 January 2011

Umar Farooq Ahmed (born 4 January 1979) is a former Danish cricketer.

== Career ==
Farooq first played for Denmark Under-19 against Ireland Under-19 in the 1995 International Youth Tournament in the Netherlands, making three appearances during the tournament. He later played five matches in the 1997 International Youth Tournament in Bermuda, before being selected in Denmark's squad for the 1998 Under-19 World Cup, making his Youth One Day International (YODI) debut in the tournament against Ireland Under-19s. He made five further YODI appearances in that World Cup, the last of which came against Namibia Under-19s.

His senior debut for Denmark came in a friendly against the Marylebone Cricket Club in 2002 at Svanholm Park, Brøndby. In that same year, he played in the European Cricket Championship, making four appearances in the tournament. The following year, he played in what would be his only List A match, against Wales Minor Counties in the 1st round of English domestic cricket's 2004 Cheltenham & Gloucester Trophy, which was held in August 2003 to avoid fixture congestion early in the 2004 season. In the match, played at Pen-y-Pound, Abergavenny, Denmark won the toss and elected to bat first, making 189/8 from their 50 overs, with Farooq being dismissed for 12 runs by Matthew Mason. In Wales Minor Counties successful chase, Farooq bowled 10 wicketless overs, conceding 24 runs. Wales Minor Counties final margin of victory was by 7 wickets. His final appearances for Denmark came in September 2003, with two appearances against Ireland.
