= Selwyn College, Cambridge =

College of the University of Cambridge

Coordinates: 52°12′04″N 0°06′22″E

Selwyn College
- University of Cambridge
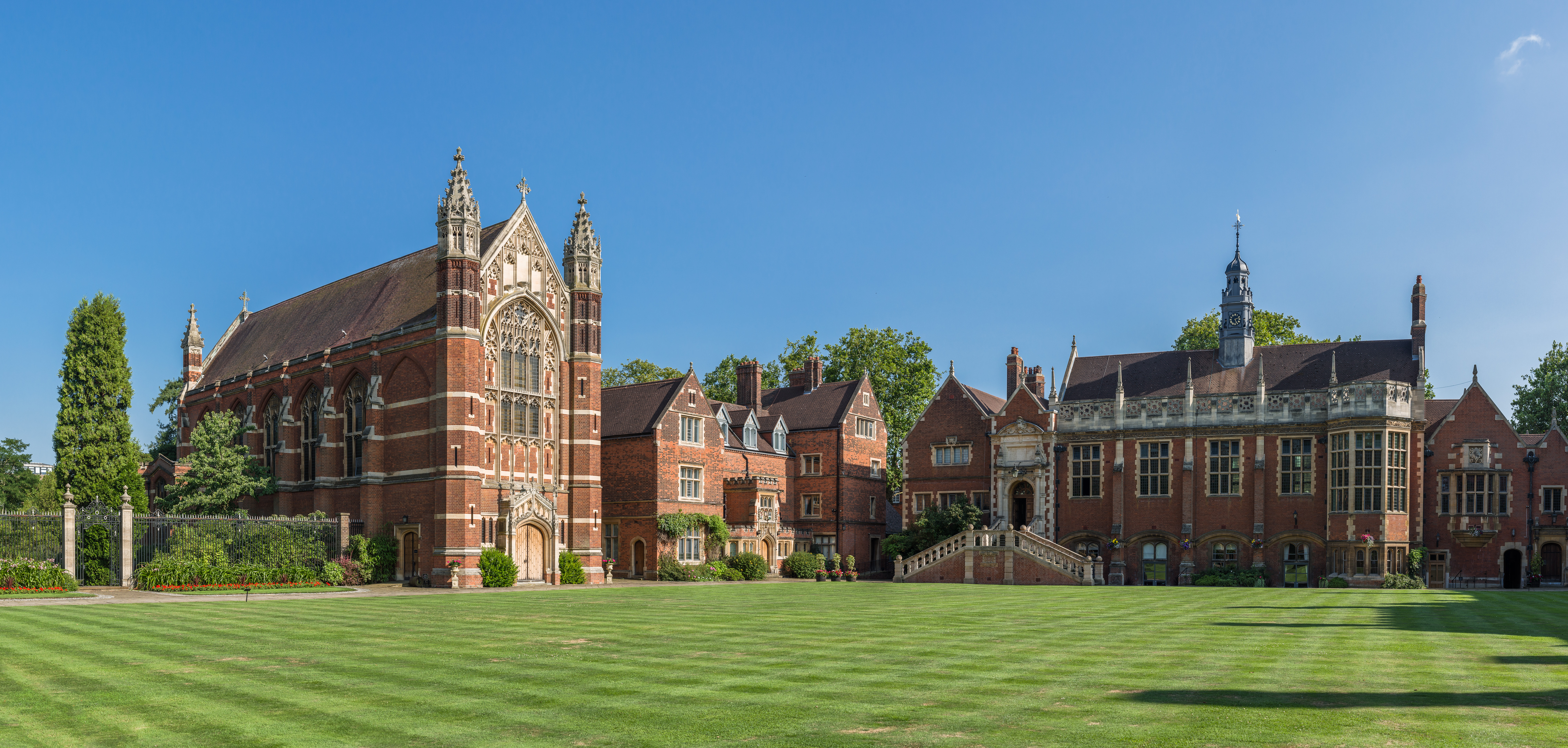
- Selwyn College's Old Court

- Arms: see below
Scarf colours: maroon, with three narrow gold stripes through the middle, the central stripe slightly narrower than others
- Location: Grange Road
- Full name: Selwyn College in the University of Cambridge
- Abbreviation: SE
- Motto: Ανδρίζεσθε
- Motto in English: "Quit ye like men"
- Established: 1882
- Named after: George Selwyn
- Sister colleges: Keble College, Oxford; Benjamin Franklin College, Yale
- Master: Suzanne Raine
- Undergraduates: 443 (2022-23)
- Postgraduates: 307 (2022-23)
- Endowment: £61.3M (2024)
- Website: www.sel.cam.ac.uk
- JCR: selwynjcr.org
- MCR: www-mcr.sel.cam.ac.uk
- Boat club: Selwyn College Boat Club

Map
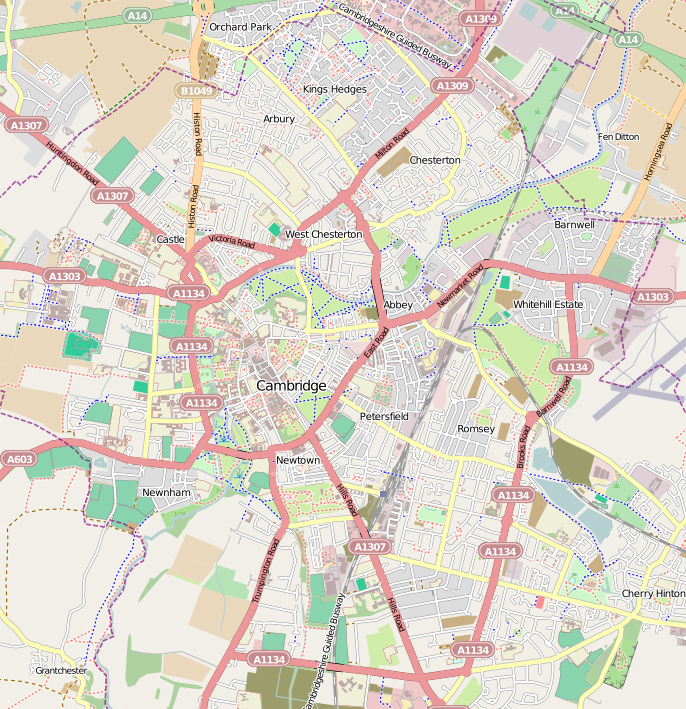
- Location within Cambridge

Selwyn College, Cambridge is a constituent college of the University of Cambridge. The college was founded in 1882 by the Selwyn Memorial Committee in memory of George Augustus Selwyn (1809–1878), the first Bishop of New Zealand (1841–1868), and subsequently Bishop of Lichfield (1868–1878). Its main buildings consist of three courts built of stone and brick (Old Court, Ann's Court, and Cripps Court). There are several secondary buildings, including adjacent townhouses and lodges serving as student hostels on Grange Road, West Road and Sidgwick Avenue. The college has some 60 fellows and 110 non-academic staff.

In 2026, Selwyn was ranked second on the Baxter Table, with Trinity topping the chart. This meant it held onto its spot, as in 2025, Selwyn was ranked second in the Baxter Table and a close third in the Tompkins Table of Cambridge colleges in order of undergraduates' performances in examinations. This built on results from 2024. The college was ranked 16th out of 30 in an assessment of college wealth conducted by the student newspaper Varsity in November 2006.

== History ==
=== George Augustus Selwyn ===
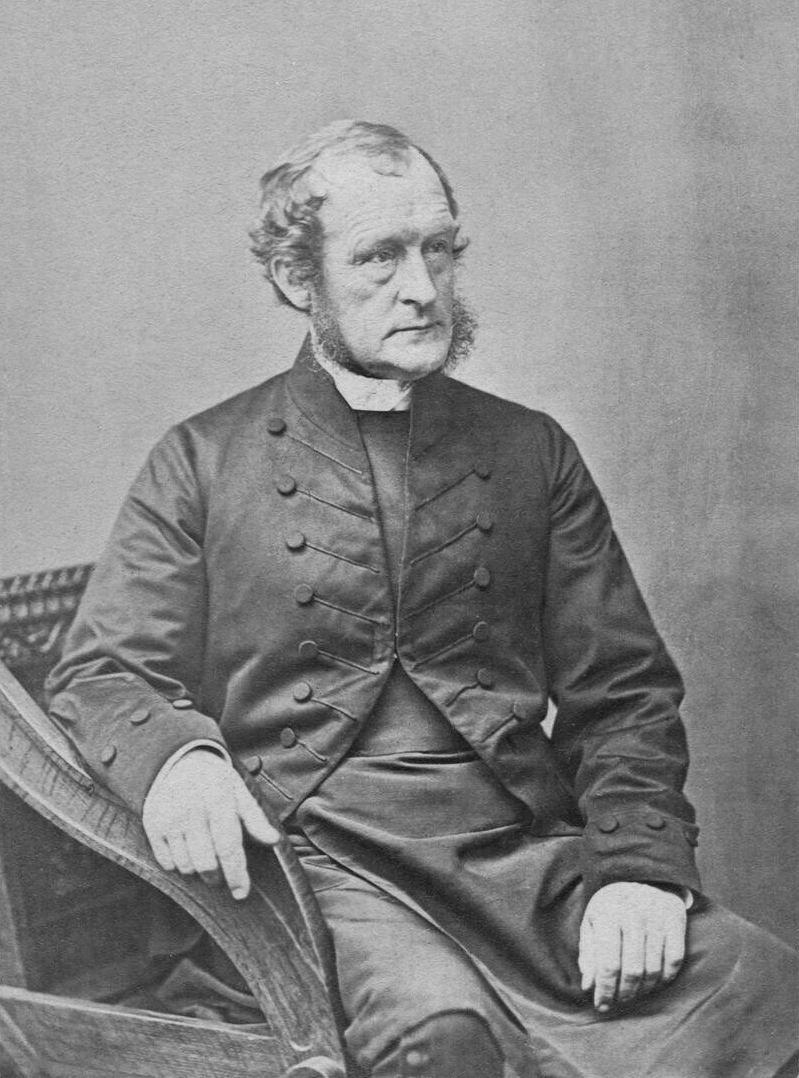
George Augustus Selwyn (1809–1878)

The college was founded following the death of Bishop George Augustus Selwyn, who had played an important role in the establishment of New Zealand as its first bishop. Selwyn was a scholar of St John's College, Cambridge, and a member of the Cambridge crew which competed in the inaugural Boat Race in 1829. He came out second in the Classical Tripos in 1831, graduating Bachelor of Arts (BA) 1831, Master of Arts (MA Cantab) 1834, and Doctor of Divinity (DD) per lit. reg. 1842, and was a fellow of St John's College from 1833 to 1840.

After graduating, Selwyn first taught at Eton College. In 1833, he was ordained deacon, and, in 1834, a priest. Selwyn displayed leadership talent and, in 1841, after an episcopal council held at Lambeth had recommended the appointment of a bishop for New Zealand, Charles James Blomfield, Bishop of London, offered the post to Selwyn.

He returned to England in 1867, and accepted the post of Bishop of Lichfield, which he held until his death on 11 April 1878, aged 69.

=== Foundation of the College ===
After Selwyn's death in 1878, a number of scholars from Cambridge launched plans to establish a college to honour his life. The Selwyn Memorial Committee was founded with Charles Abraham (Bishop of Wellington) as secretary, and it proposed that a Cambridge college should be established as a memorial. The college's first Master, Arthur Lyttelton, was formally elected on 10 March 1879, the Archbishop of Canterbury Archibald Tait was invited to become Visitor on 28 June 1878 and building of Old Court, as it is now known, began in 1880.

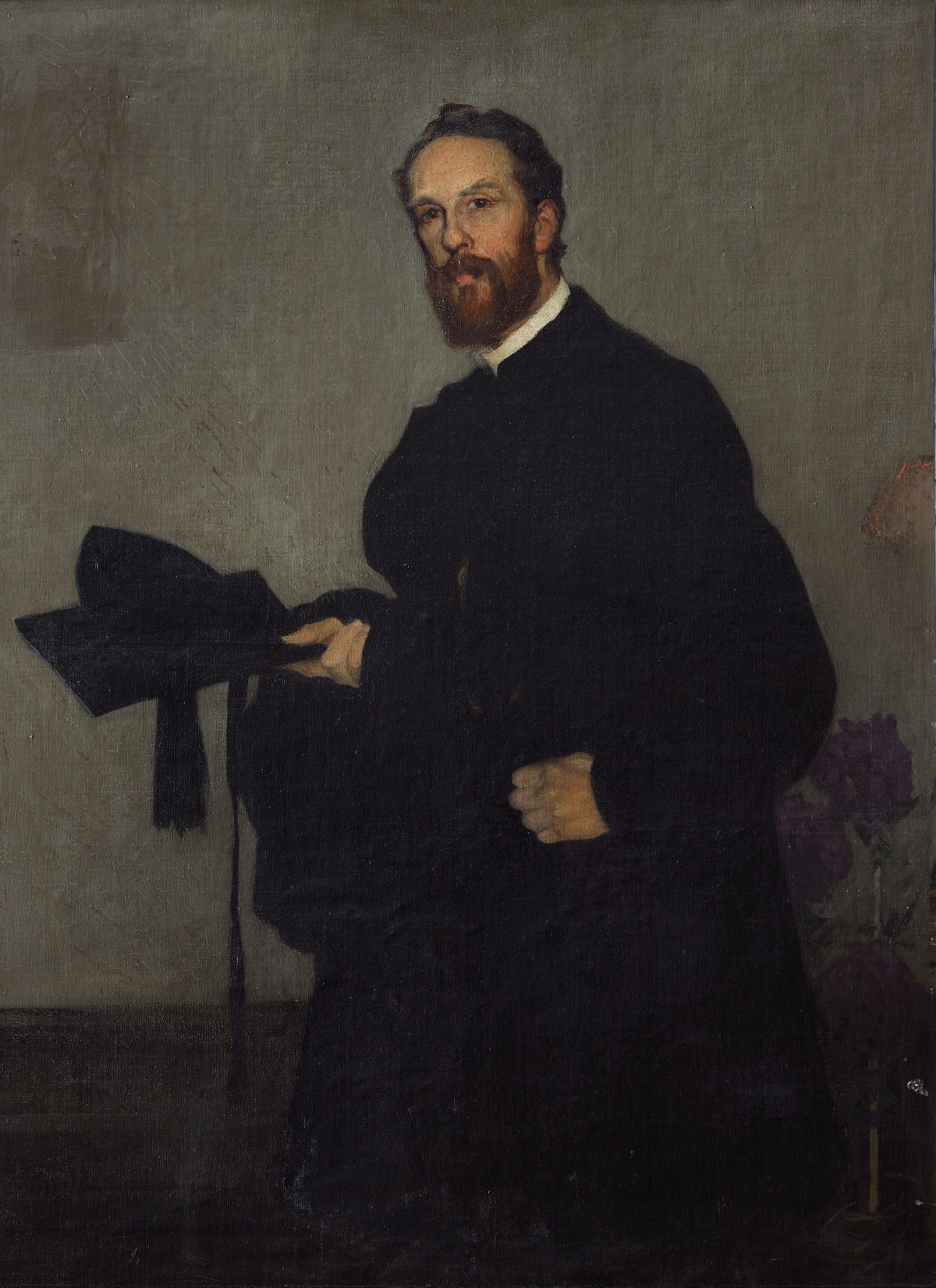
First Master of Selwyn College, Arthur Lyttelton

The foundation stone of the college was laid by Edward Herbert, 3rd Earl of Powis in a ceremony on 1 June 1881, following a lunch in King's College, Cambridge. A Charter of Incorporation was granted by Queen Victoria on 13 September 1882, and the west range of Old Court was ready for use by the college's official opening (with the Master's installation) on 10 October 1882, in time for Michaelmas term. Selwyn's first 28 undergraduates joined the original master and 12 other Fellows at the then Public Hostel of the university in 1882.

The first master of the college was Arthur Lyttelton, who sought to establish the college on a firm academic and financial foundation. Lyttelton had been senior tutor at Keble College, Oxford. He came from a well-established family with strong connections in both Church and State, his mother being the sister-in-law of the prime minister, William Ewart Gladstone, who became a major benefactor of the college. Lyttelton was himself a life-long supporter of the Liberal party and was familiar with many politicians in Westminster, his wife Kathleen, a women's activist, being the daughter of the Liberal MP George Clive. Lyttelton persuaded Gladstone to make a personal gift to the college of the louder of the two chapel bells. Gladstone reportedly believed that Cambridge students needed to be well woken if they were to get up at a productive time in the morning. Today, the chapel bell is known as 'Gladstone's Bell' by students.

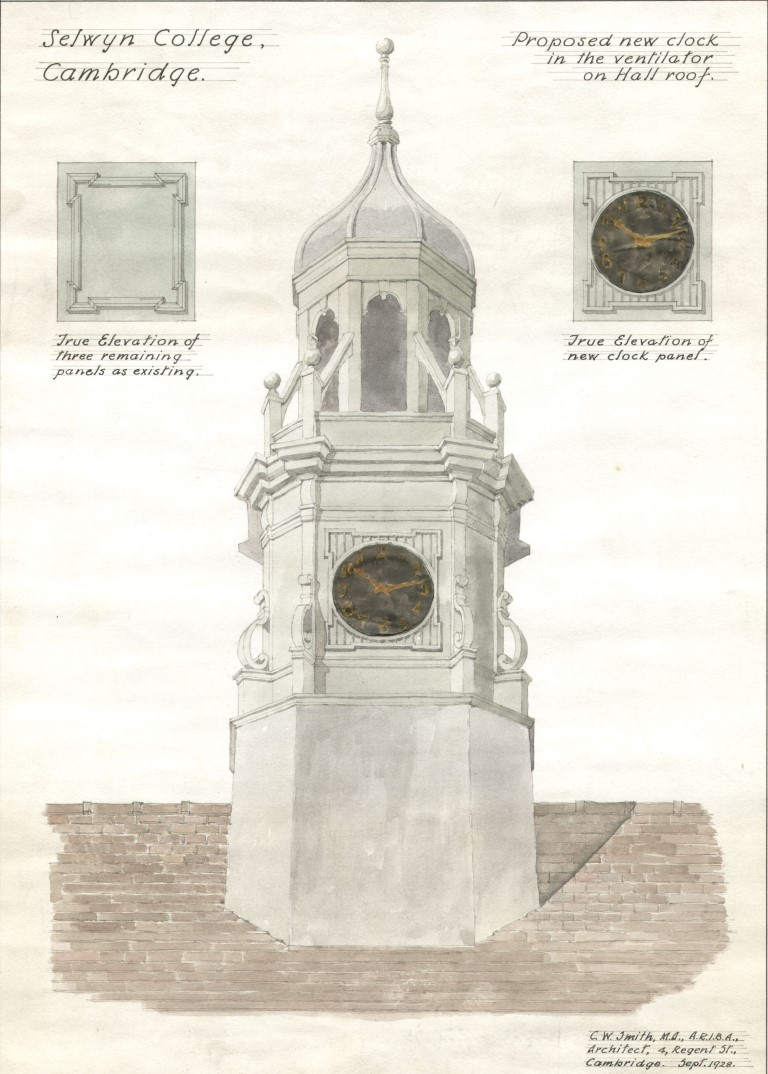
Selwyn College Clock Tower

The college was founded by donations and subscriptions, with a distinctly religious character. The royal charter for the college, reproducing the terms of the charter of Keble College, was sealed on 13 September 1882. The charter declared that the college was "founded and constituted with the especial object and intent of providing persons desirous of academic education and willing to live economically with a College wherein sober living and high culture of the mind may be combined with Christian training based upon the principles of the Church of England". Initially, only baptised Christians were accepted as students or scholars. The original foundation charter specified that the college should "make provision for those who intend to serve as missionaries overseas and ... educate the sons of clergymen".

Selwyn was not yet a full college of the university, but a "Public Hostel", with its undergraduates regarded as non-collegiate and marked with the designation "H. Selw." on Senate House lists. University education was expensive at the time of Selwyn's foundation, and given that Selwyn College was intended to be a place for young students who could not otherwise afford an Oxbridge education, the college charges were initially kept low. Undergraduates initially paid £27 per term for food, lodgings, lectures and tuition, with a small surcharge for students of medicine, scientists and engineers. This was raised to £28 in 1916, and £33 in 1918, as the number of scholars studying at Oxford and Cambridge drastically decreased due to the First World War.

=== Later development ===
In 1926 the "Public Hostel" status was abolished, replaced with that of "Approved Foundation", granting more security to the college. The distinction of the college as "H. Selw." on Senate House lists had also ceased from June 1924.

On 14 March 1958, Selwyn was granted full collegiate status.

Selwyn, in common with most other Oxford and Cambridge colleges, originally admitted only men, but was one of the first colleges to become mixed when women were admitted from 1976. In that year, women lived only on E and H Staircases, but in subsequent years could live anywhere in College. In 1999, Selwyn appointed the first female Director of Music in an Oxbridge College, Sarah MacDonald, and in 2009, Selwyn became the first Cambridge college to appoint a female head porter, Helen Stephens.

In the 2020s the college became known for its widening-participation and academic successes, admitting one of the highest proportions of maintained school (UK state schools) undergraduates of the Cambridge colleges (81% in 2023) while being ranked 1st for 'good honours' examination results in 2024.

== Buildings and grounds ==
The college founders purchased from Corpus Christi College 6 acres (2.4 hectares) of land between Grange Road, West Road and Sidgwick Avenue on 3 November 1879, at a cost of £6,111 9s 7d. This parcel of land is still owned by the college and is the location of Old Court and Ann's Court. The site was originally considered somewhat remote from the centre of the university, but Selwyn now neighbours the Sidgwick Site where several of the university's arts and humanities faculties are. An alternative site on Lensfield Road, where Our Lady and the English Martyrs Church now stands, was considered but rejected as too small.

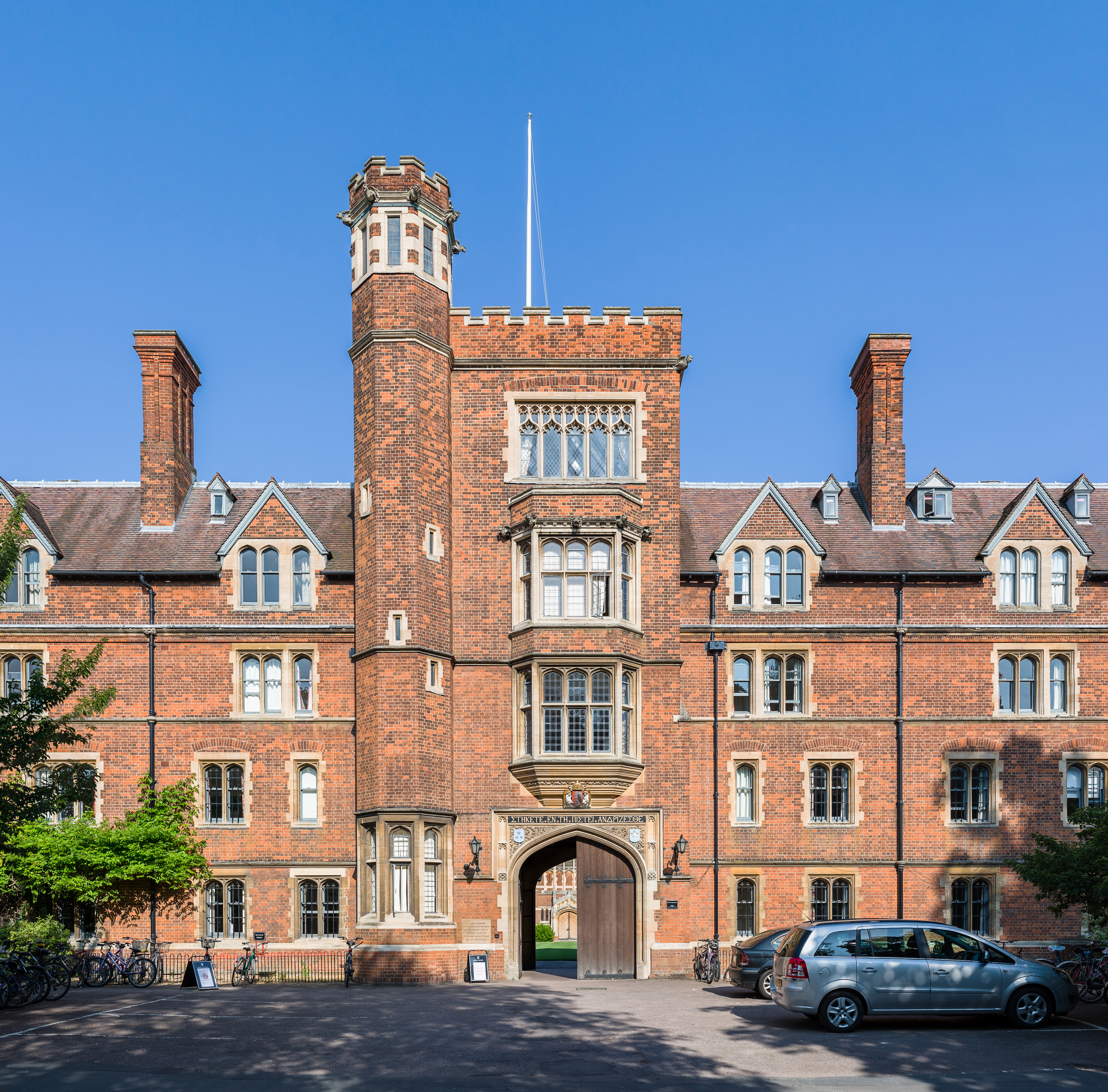
Selwyn College Tower

=== Old Court ===
Old Court, construction of which began in 1880 and is built in Ketton stone and local red brick in the Victorian Late Perpendicular Gothic Revival style, was largely designed by Sir Arthur Blomfield and comprises seven staircases (A–G), together with a tower and gateway, Master's Lodge, Chapel, Hall, Kitchens, Music Practice Room and Archives.

The chapel was built in 1895 before the dining hall (in 1909), and chapel attendance was compulsory for students from the college's foundation until 1935. There were originally plans to build a permanent library between F Staircase and the chapel to complete Old Court, on land that now forms part of the College Gardens, but this was not done. The Selwyn College Library located adjacent to Old Court was opened in 1929, funded by subscriptions in honour of college members who had died in the First World War. In 1894 and 1896, respectively, the Old Library in the tower, received two extensive benefactions of history, politics and theological texts, from Canon William Cooke and Edward Wheatley-Balme. These large literary bequests gave Selwyn College an excellent working library.

The Jacobean style Dining Hall was constructed under the tenure of the fourth Master, Richard Appleton, who had previously been a senior fellow of Trinity College, Cambridge. His appointment as Master continued the close relationship between Selwyn and Trinity which had been supportive of the younger college. Appleton served for two years from 1907 before he died of influenza. Despite his brief mastership, Appleton had managed to secure funding for the Dining Hall. Appleton's initials and rebus (three apples and a tun) appear on the north wall of the Hall entrance, and his posthumously painted portrait hangs in the college. Construction on the dining hall began in 1909, but Appleton did not live to see the project completed.

The dining hall was always intended to be panelled, however, this vision could not be realised until the woodwork for the west side of the hall was presented in 1913 by the Magdalene fellow, A. C. Benson in memory of his father Archbishop Benson. This panelling came from the English Church in Rotterdam which was designed by the office of Sir Christopher Wren between 1699 and 1708.

=== Cripps Court ===
Cripps Court, named after the Cripps Foundation that donated most of the funds to build it (and which also funded developments at St John's College, Queens' College and Magdalene College) was built and formally opened on 17 May 1969 on land on the opposite side of Grange Road which was originally owned by Jesus College. Selwyn's Cripps Court features a tricolon design with ensuite rooms for students. Cripps Court comprises a further seven staircases (H–N) and is home to all of Selwyn's first-year undergraduates, a few second-year undergraduates and postgraduates including their common room, the Middle Combination Room (MCR).

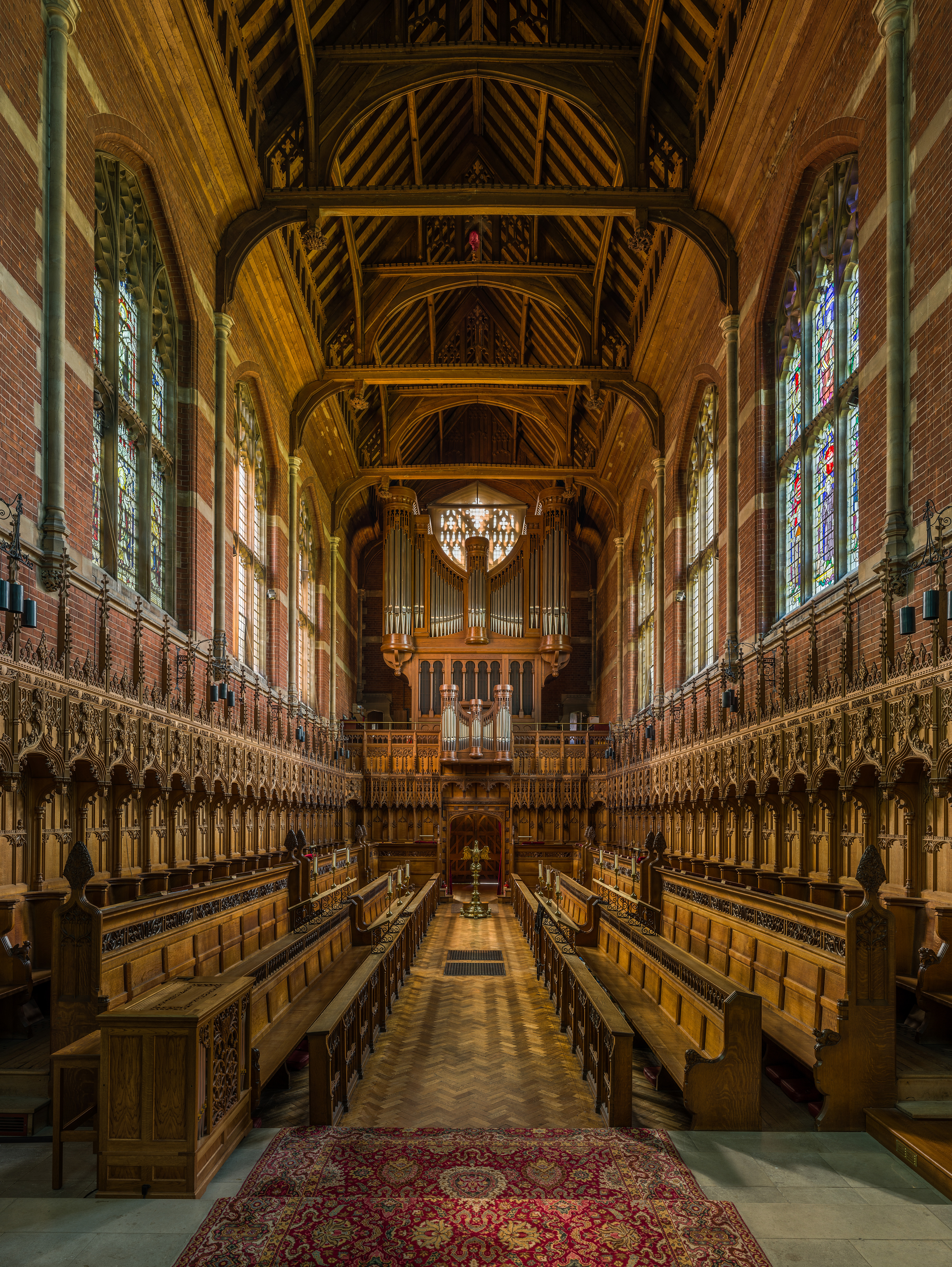
The chapel facing west towards the entrance and organ

=== Ann's Court ===
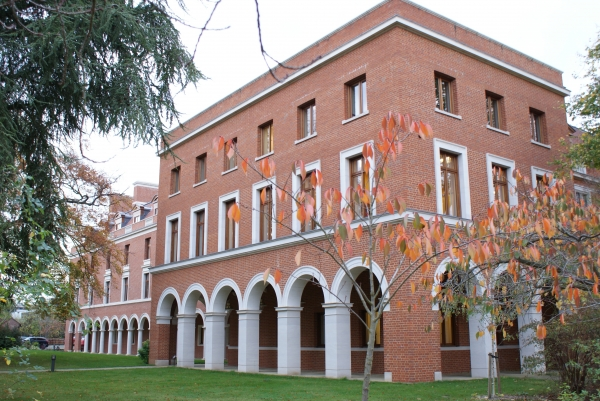
Ann's Court, Selwyn College

Ann's Court, built on the land to the north of Old Court and south of West Road, is the most recent court. Its exterior reflects the atmosphere of the rest of the college with Ketton limestone and brick-work fixtures. Ann's Court was designed by the traditionalist architect Demetri Porphyrios who has completed similar new projects at Magdalen College, Oxford, which also utilised hand-carved Ketton stone in its exteriors, and at Princeton University (Whitman College) in the United States. The golden-yellow Ketton stone used in Ann's Court (and the rest of Selwyn College) has been used in the construction of Oxford and Cambridge colleges for several hundred years, and can be seen in the exterior of the Wren Library at Trinity College. The interior of Ann's Court is contemporary and equipped with wooden staircases. As a proponent of New Classical Architecture, Porphyrios designed new buildings which fit the existing limestone and brick materials of Selwyn College. The Porphyrios Associates design involved a three-winged building which created the space for a large new court to be formed in the middle of the college, named Centre Court. Ann's Court features hand-carved details and a series of limestone cloisters and chimneys arranged in the traditional Cambridge University fashion.

Ann's Court was named after Ann Dobson, who with her husband Christopher Dobson (who matriculated at Selwyn in 1957) formed the Ann Dobson Foundation, which is one of the principal donors towards the construction costs of Phases I and II. Phase I was completed in July 2005 and consists of 43 ensuite rooms and 15 administrative offices, forming two staircases (O and P) at a cost of £7.5 million. The second phase, including 40 en-suite bedrooms forming staircases Q and R and a new Junior Combination Room (JCR) at a cost of £2.5 million, was completed in Summer 2009. The college bar was refurbished in 2002, and redecorated in 2011.

=== Future plans ===
The college had planning permission to develop further three phases of building, planned to be built as funding permits, extending the college's distinctive limestone and red-brick façade along Grange Road to the corner of West Road. The plans consisted of a new library and archives (Phase 3) behind Staircase E of Old Court, and two further accommodation blocks (Phase 4) to form a new court (tentatively named Library Court) between Old Court and Ann's Court, and an auditorium, debate chamber, and conference facilities (Phase 5) to complete the west side of Ann's Court.

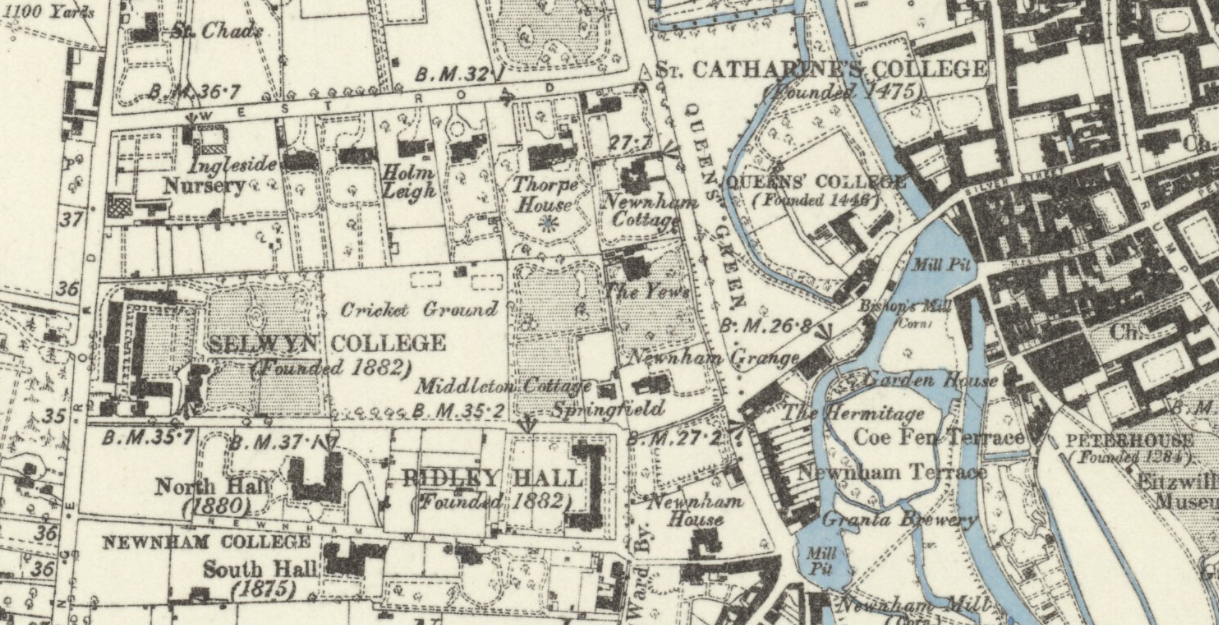
Map of Selwyn College (1886)

However, plans changed. Instead the new Bartlam Library and the Quarry Whitehouse Auditorium opened in 2021 next to Ann's Court. The college ensured that the original library would be preserved and converted into lecture and auditorium room which it has been, as it promised in 2018. The next proposed phase is to refurbish the two hostels. It will see installation of air source heat pumps, double glazing and insulation. A new accessible room will be created, allowing full access for a wheelchair user or those with other accessibility needs. The two hostels will provide modern comfortable rooms for 20 students. The entrance pavilion will also provide two informal study areas for students. https://www.sel.cam.ac.uk/alumni/anns-court-north

== Coat of arms and motto ==
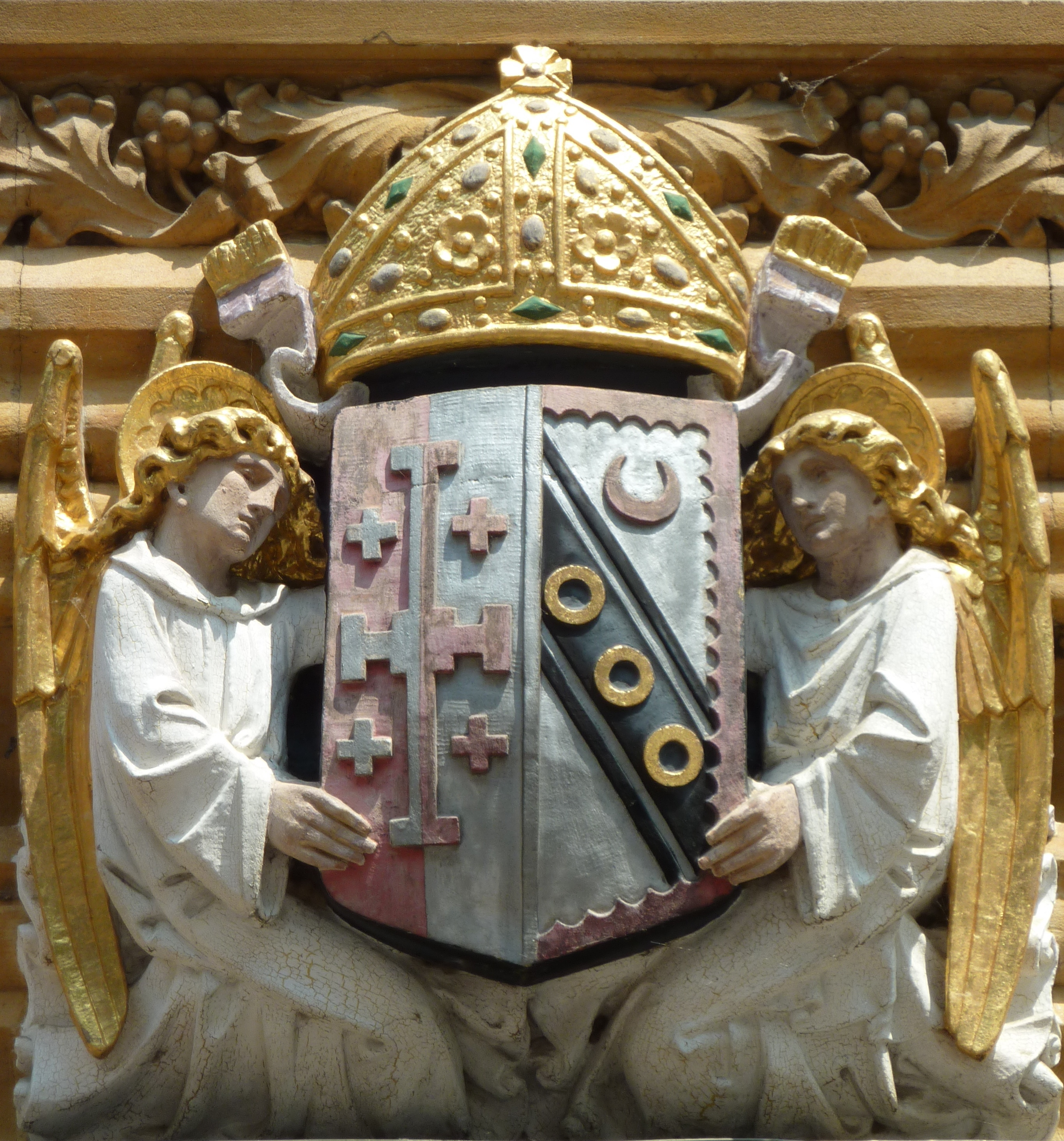
The arms used by George Augustus Selwyn as Bishop of Lichfield, above the college's Main Gate to Old Court

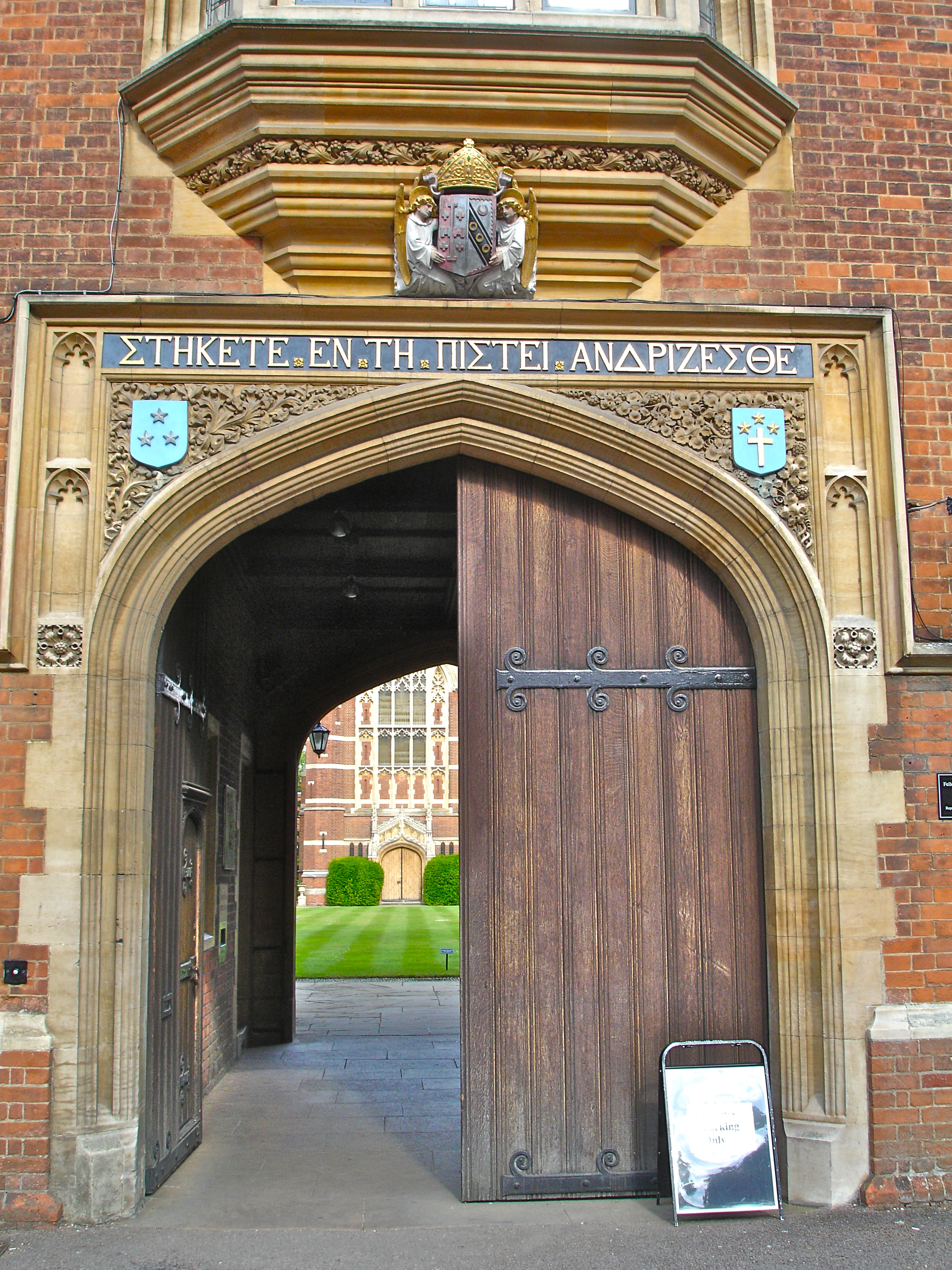
Main Gate with the Greek quotation which contains the College motto

The Selwyn College coat of arms incorporates the arms of the Selwyn family impaled with an adaptation of the arms of the Diocese of Lichfield. The arms were granted in the 1960s and are emblazoned as follows;

Per pale Gules and Argent a Cross potent quadrate Argent and Or between four crosses paty those to the dexter Argent those to the sinister Or For the See of Lichfield impaling Argent on a Bend cotised Sable three Annulets Or for Selwyn all within a Bordure Sable And for Crest On a Wreath Or & Purpure In front of a Book erect bound Gules edged clasped and garnished Or a representation of the Pastoral Staff of Bishop Selwyn.

The dexter half of the arms adapted from those of the See of Lichfield, are unusual, with or (gold) countercharged on argent (silver), violating the rule of tincture, which prohibits a metal to be charged with another metal. This is thought to refer to the arms of the Kingdom of Jerusalem, which also violates this rule. Selwyn's pastoral staff or crozier is based on a hardwood Māori staff which is held in the College Chapel. The college was also granted an official badge, A Mitre Or within an Annulet Purpure.

Before an official grant by the College of Arms, Selwyn College used arms believed to be those borne by George Augustus Selwyn as Bishop of Lichfield; they are displayed above the main gateway, built in 1881, and on the Common Seal, first used in 1882.

The college motto is a biblical quotation from 1 Corinthians, chapter 16, verse 13, in Greek, ΑΝΔΡΙΖΕΣΘΕ (andrízesthe), translated in the King James Version as "Quit ye like men" (alternatively, in the Douay–Rheims version, "Do manfully" or, in the New American Bible, "Be courageous"). A longer extract of the verse, "ΣΤΗΚΕΤΕ ΕΝ ΤΗ ΠΙΣΤΕΙ ΑΝΔΡΙΖΕΣΘΕ", is carved over the main College gate (the full Greek verse of 1 Corinthians 16:13 being "Γρηγορεῖτε, στήκετε ἐν τῇ πίστει, ἀνδρίζεσθε, κραταιοῦσθε·"; Grēgoreîte, stḗkete en têi pístei, andrízesthe, krataioûsthe).

== Traditions ==
=== Formal Hall ===
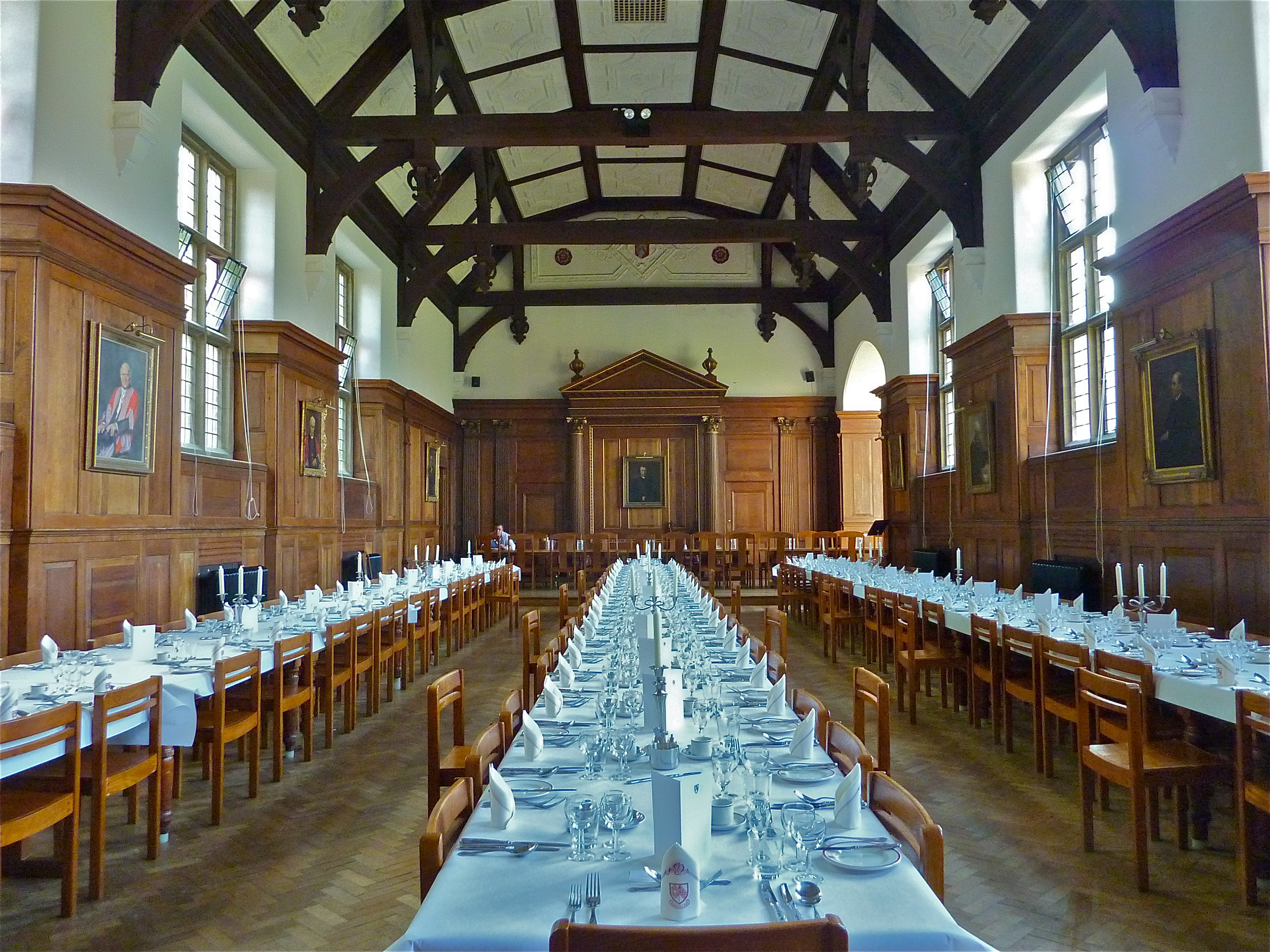
The Dining Hall, with the tables laid for Formal Hall

Selwyn holds Formal Hall on every Tuesday and Thursday evening during Term at 7:30 pm with a capacity of 120, tickets for which can be bought by students for themselves and up to two guests. An additional Formal Hall was held on Sunday evenings at least until the early 1990s. There is also a special, extra Halfway Hall Formal for second-year students to mark the middle of their time as undergraduate students at the college, and a Christmas Formal for all students at the end of every Michaelmas Term. Selwyn holds several JCR Dinners and MCR Dinners specifically for undergraduate and graduate students each term.

Formal Halls are for students, Fellows and the Master of the college; however, members of other Oxbridge colleges may attend, as well as a limited number of guests from outside the university. Formal hall meals are three- or four-course meals which are fully catered and served by college staff. During formal hall, the fellows and the master of the college sit at the High Table near the front of the hall, while students sit on benches or chairs at the long tables.

==== Latin Grace ====
The college Grace is recited in Latin by a Fellow or Scholar (a student who achieved a First Class mark overall in the previous year) at the beginning of Formal Hall, and is as follows:

Benedic, Domine, nobis et donis Tuis, quae de Tua largitate sumus sumpturi; et concede ut iis muneribus Tuis ad laudem Tuam utamur, gratisque animis fruamur, per Jesum Christum Dominum nostrum. Amen.

Translation:

Bless us, O Lord, and all thy gifts, which of thy goodness we are about to enjoy; grant that we may use these generosities to thy glory, and enjoy them with thankful hearts, through Jesus Christ our Lord. Amen.

When the High Table rises, the following concluding Grace is said Benedicamus Domino (Let us bless the Lord), with the response being Laus Deo (Praise be to God). This response was changed in the 1990s, from the previous response Deo gratias (Thanks be to God).

==== Loyal toast ====
Selwyn has a tradition in which senior fellows and members of the college commonly remain seated for the college's loyal toast during formal hall. This tradition is not observed out of disrespect or irreverence for the sovereign, but rather, out of courtesy and remembrance of the former Master of the college, John Selwyn, who could not easily stand for the loyal toast owing to the limited use of his legs in later life. John Selwyn (son of George Augustus Selwyn) served as the second Master of Selwyn College (1893–1898).

=== Lecture series ===
Selwyn College hosts an annual lecture named in honour of Ramsay Murray, an alumnus of the college during the 1930s. The Ramsay Murray Lecture Series was established in 1994 following a significant bequest from the Murray estate. Lecturers have included many high-profile politicians, academics, and journalists including Onora O’Neill, Niall Ferguson, Michael Howard, Ian Kershaw, Roy Porter, Ian Clark, Lawrence Freedman, David Cannadine, Keith Thomas, Jonathan Riley-Smith and Quentin Skinner, former Regius Professor of Modern History. The 2018 Ramsay Murray lecture features the journalist Frank Gardner. The lectures are free and open to the public.

== Student life ==
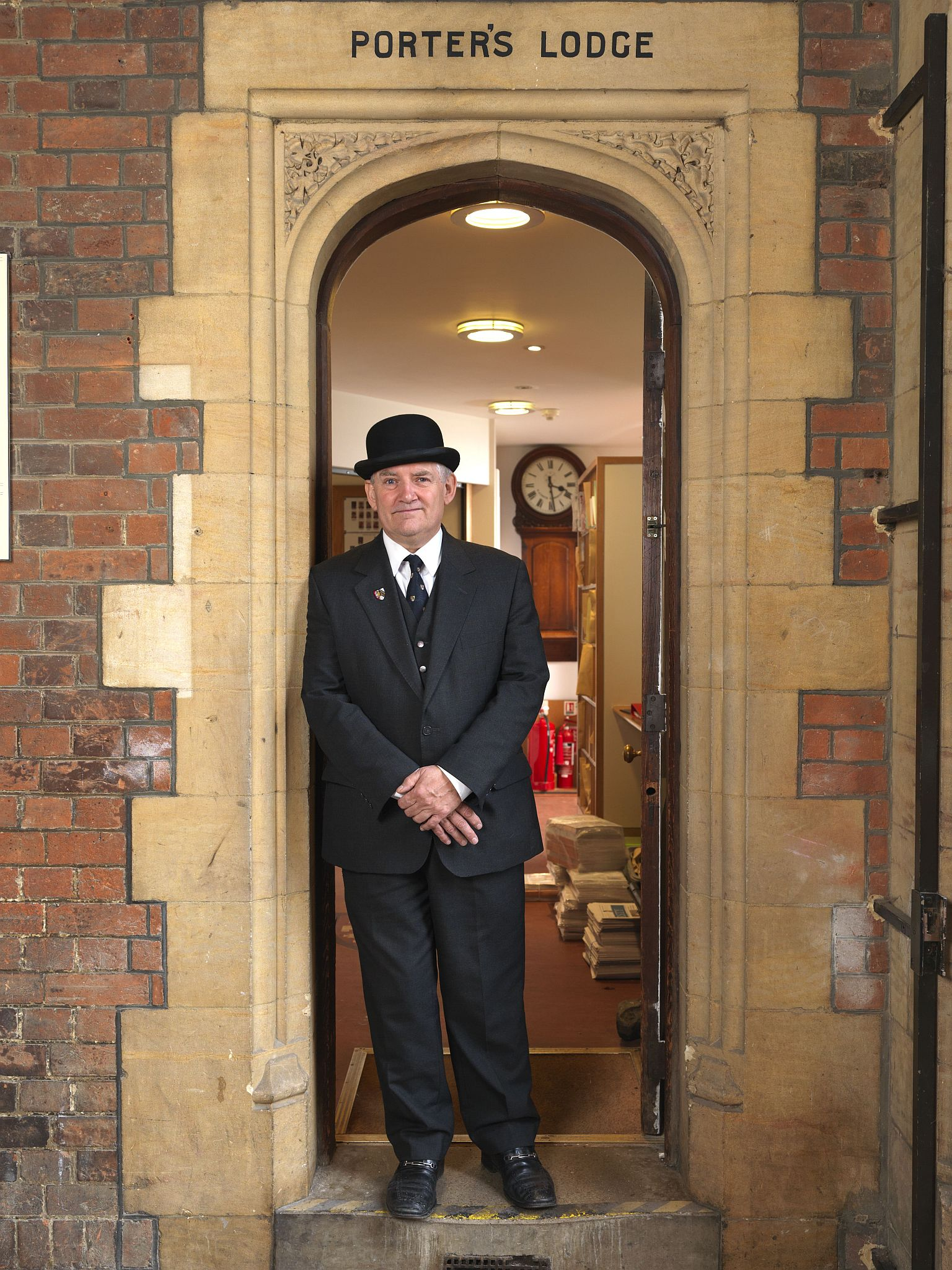
Porter's Lodge

Selwyn has a reputation as one of the most traditional but friendliest Oxbridge colleges. Students of Selwyn College are required to wear their gowns to all formal halls, ceremonies and college functions. The Selwyn gown is made of a thick black cloth with dark navy blue inline lapels.

=== Common rooms ===
Selwyn College Junior Combination Room (JCR) is the students' union for undergraduates students. Elected in Michaelmas term, it organises social and welfare events, negotiates with the college on the students' behalf, and represents Selwyn on Cambridge University Students' Union (CUSU) Council. JCR is affiliated to CUSU and by extension to the National Union of Students.

The Middle Combination Room (MCR) comprises the graduate students of Selwyn College, and is similarly represented by the MCR Committee (MCRc). The MCR is located in Cripps Court. The presidents and treasurers of the JCRc and MCRc have sat on College Council, the main decision-making body of the college, since it was reformed in 1989.

=== Student societies ===
The college is host to a number of student organisations, including the Hermes Club, Selwyn College Music Society and Selwyn Jazz, and on the stage by amateur dramatics society The Mighty Players. Selwyn has the longest continually running students' magazine— of any Cambridge College; Kiwi has been published from 1982 to present.

The chapel choir is a mixed choir that sings three weekly services during full term, has toured widely and has made over 15 commercial CD recordings under their professional director, Sarah MacDonald. The Choir has also included members of the neighbouring women's college, Newnham College, since before the integration of women to Selwyn.

==== Hermes Club ====
The Hermes Club, founded in 1920, exists to encourage, fund and improve sport at Selwyn College by offering financial grants to individual sportsmen/women and college teams, through the lobbying of college, and by generally raising the profile of sport in Selwyn. Members of Selwyn are eligible for invitation to the club if they have been awarded a Full Blue or Half Blue by the university, if they have captained a Selwyn College team in a 'First Class sport', or if they have competed on behalf of Selwyn in two 'First Class' Cuppers competitions.

Alumni of the club fund two major sports grant schemes – the Hermes Fund and the Vickerstaff Sports Bursary Scheme.

==== Boat Club ====
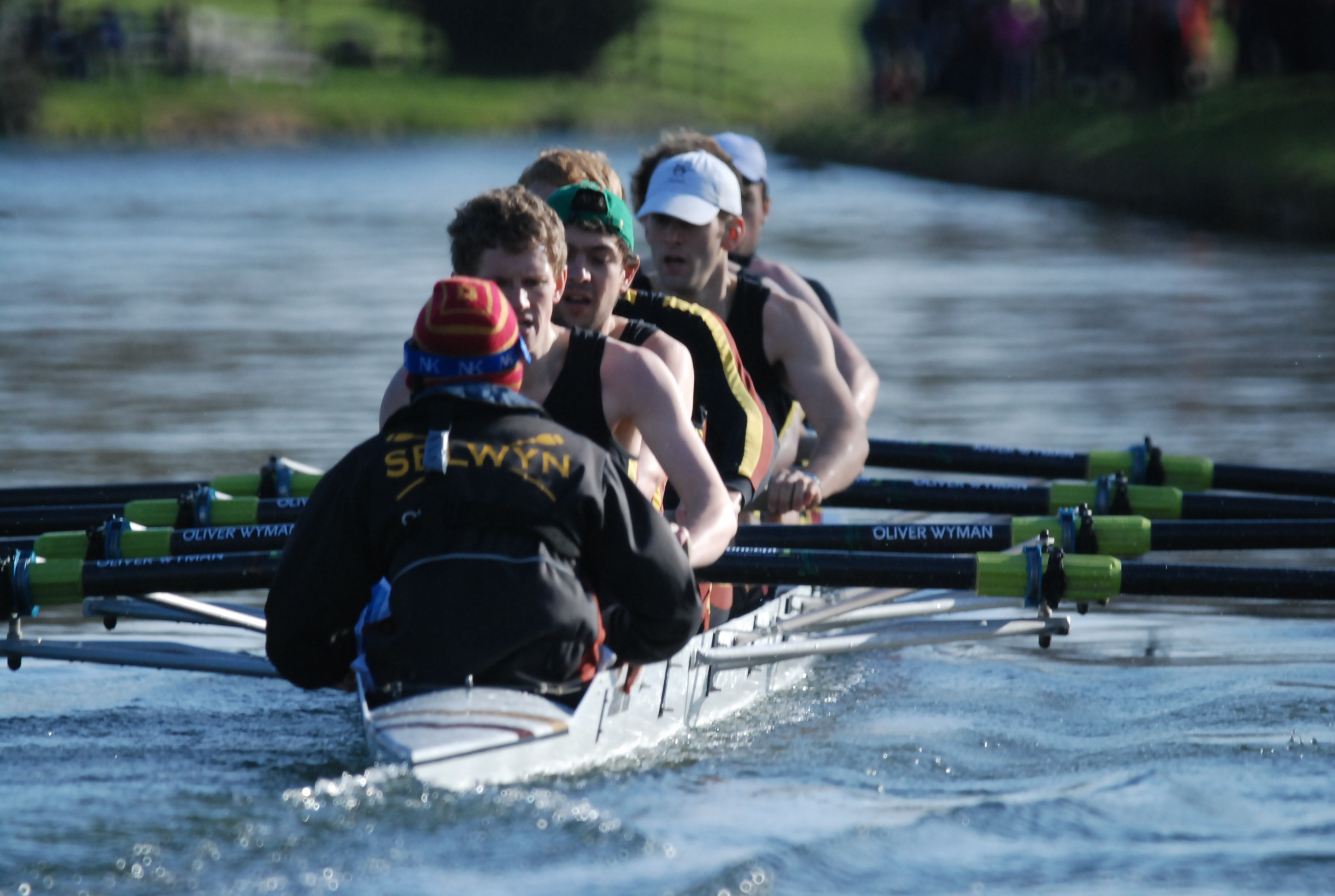
Selwyn College Boat Club, Lent Bumps 2012

Selwyn College Boat Club (SCBC) is the rowing club for members of the college. The boat club was founded in 1882, during the Michaelmas term. During this early period, the Selwyn Boat Club trained several rowers who would go on to become Olympic Rowers and University Blues in the annual boat race against Oxford. The SCBC also achieved intercollegiate success during its early days, winning a second in the Lent Bumps of 1934 and third in the May Bumps 1931. Notable alumni of the boat club include Hugh Laurie, Tom Hollander and Richard Budgett.

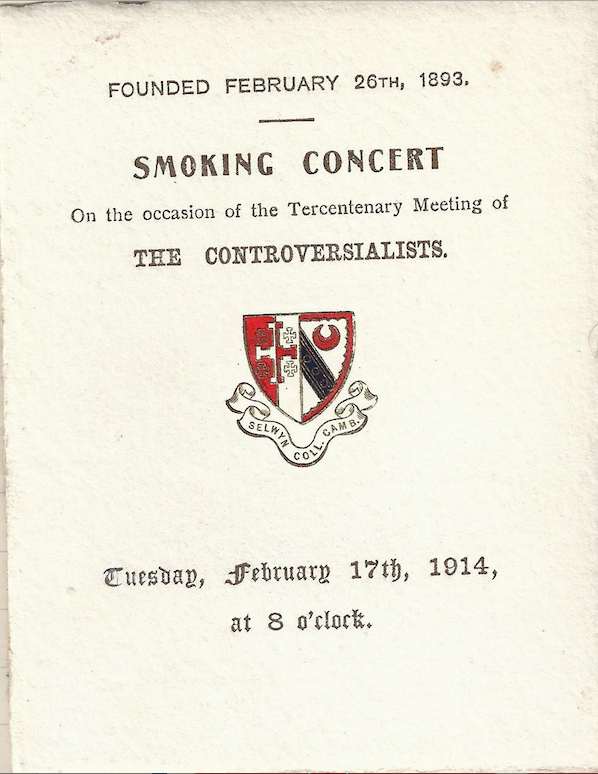
Programme for a 1914 smoking concert of the Controversialists

==== The Controversialists ====
The Controversialists are the oldest secret society at the college and one of the oldest at the university, being founded by a group of students in Lent Term, 1893. The society's name is believed to pay homage to both their leftist political leanings and their discussion and debate of poetry and literature. The purpose of the Society, according to rules printed in 1909, was "the reading and discussion of English poetry and drama". The Society membership was made up of both undergraduate and graduate students at Selwyn College. Female students were able to join the society since women were admitted to the college. The total number of Controversialist members is not allowed to exceed twelve. Meetings are traditionally to be held on Sundays in the Michaelmas and Lent terms, as well as in May if a quorum of five members can be arranged. The badge and symbol of the Controversialists is a purple lyre.

The Controversialists commonly organise smoking concerts where poetry and verse is recited by members before the political discussions.

==== The Templars ====
The Selwyn College Templars are reputed to be the second oldest secret society and the largest at the college. The society was initially only open to wealthy, upper-class Anglican students. The membership of the Templars Society were often involved with campus politics and were often members of the Cambridge University Conservative Association. Membership was to be decided by nomination from two current members and election at the society's Michaelmas meeting. New members of the Templars are reportedly 'knighted' with a ceremonial sword in a bizarre initiation ceremony that takes place on the Autumn equinox each year.

In 2014, a Cambridge student newspaper reported that the Selwyn Templars Society were involved in a scandal where sexist and misogynistic messages were sent to members of the society. The college condemned the content of the reported messages.

=== Winter and May balls ===
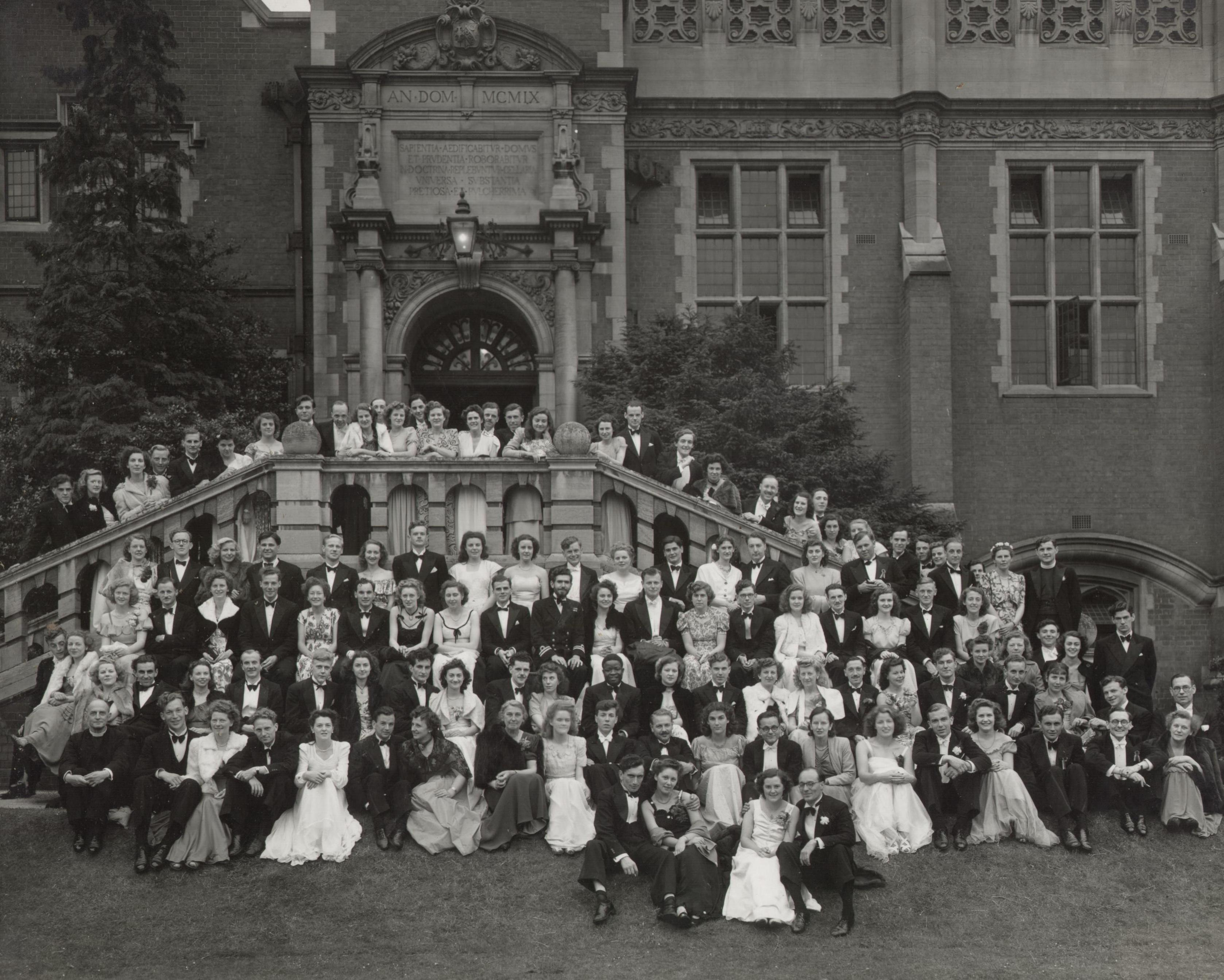
Selwyn College May Ball Survivors (1948)

Selwyn is unique among Oxbridge colleges in that it holds an annual Winter Ball known as the Selwyn Snowball, which traditionally takes place on the night of the last Friday of Michaelmas term.

The May Ball tradition at Selwyn began on 14 June 1948, as hundreds of students dressed in black tie to attend the all-night celebration. May Balls continued to be held at the college throughout the second half of the 20th century with a highlight being the performance of The Who in 1967. In recent years, May Balls have been replaced by the Snowball with notable exceptions: 2008, to celebrate the college's 125th anniversary; 2015 and 2017.

== Gallery ==
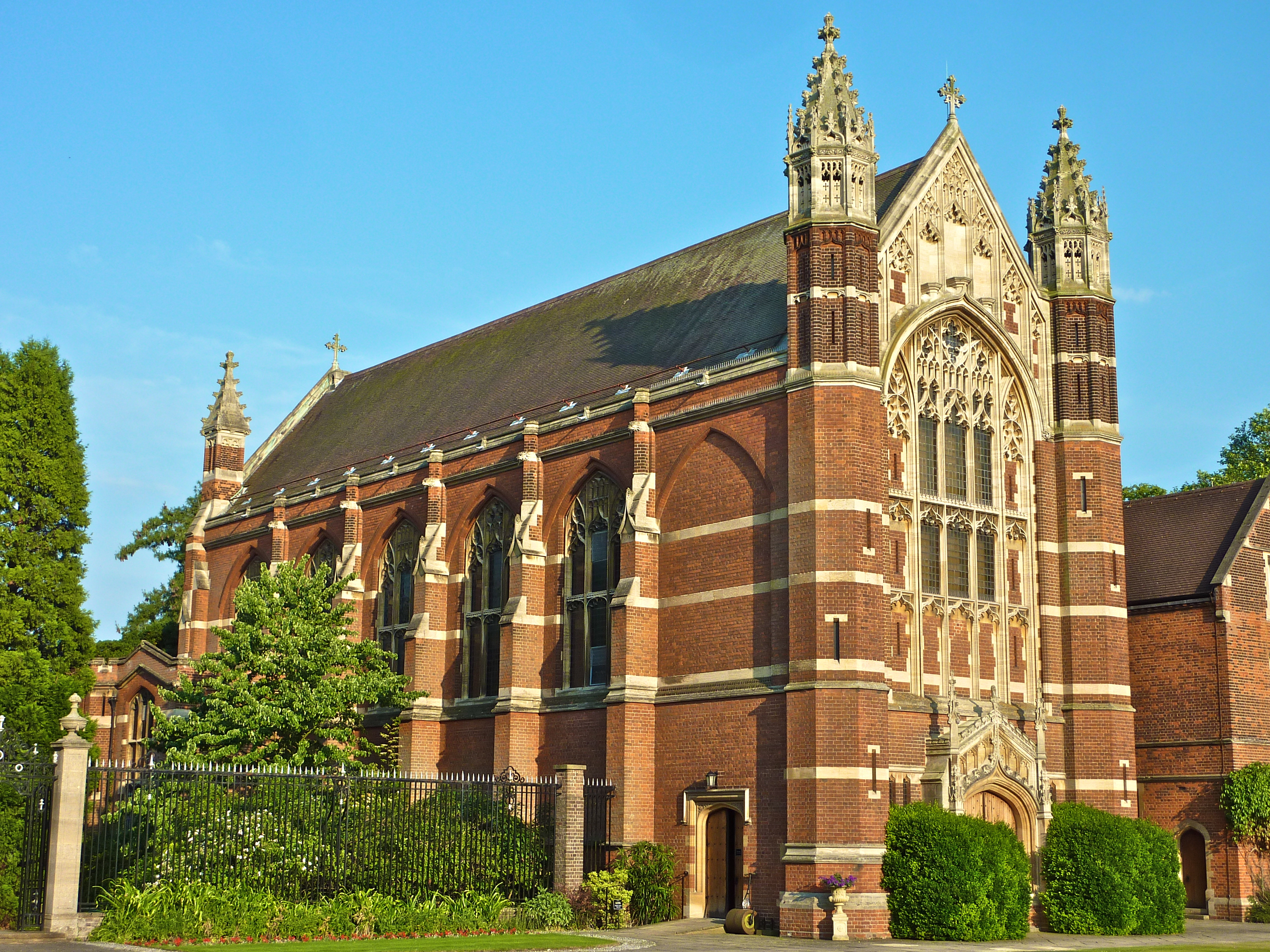
Selwyn College Chapel exterior

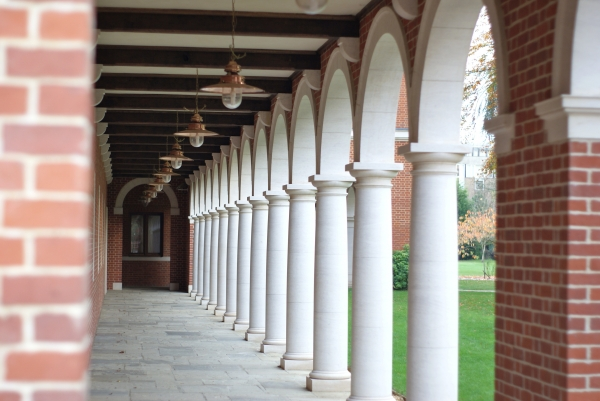
Selwyn College Cloisters

== Notable alumni ==
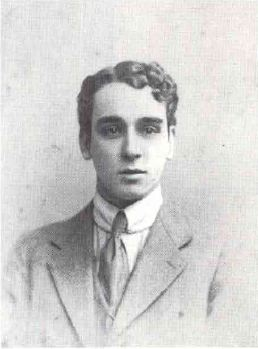
Ralph Chubb (poet)

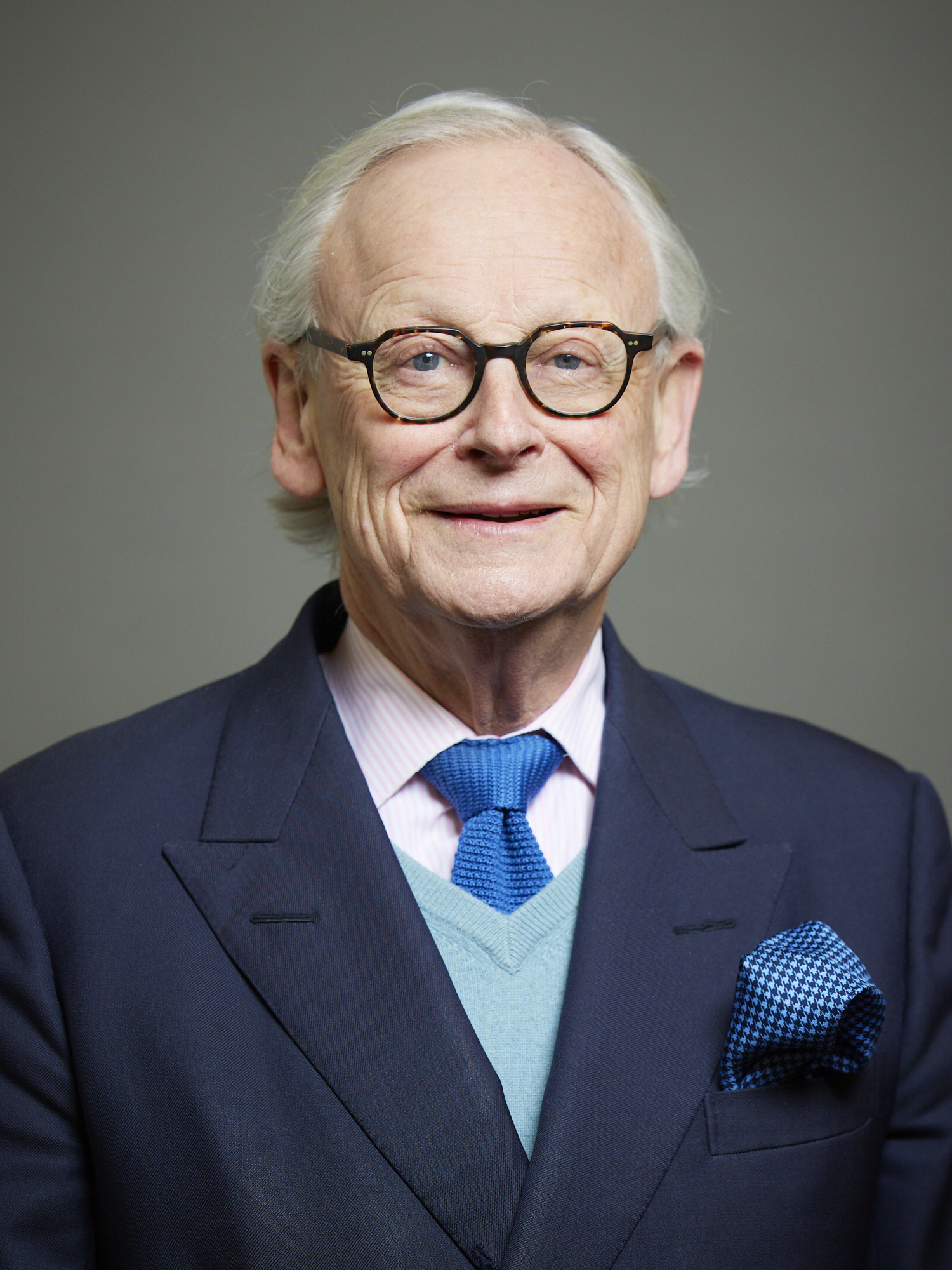
Lord Deben (politician)

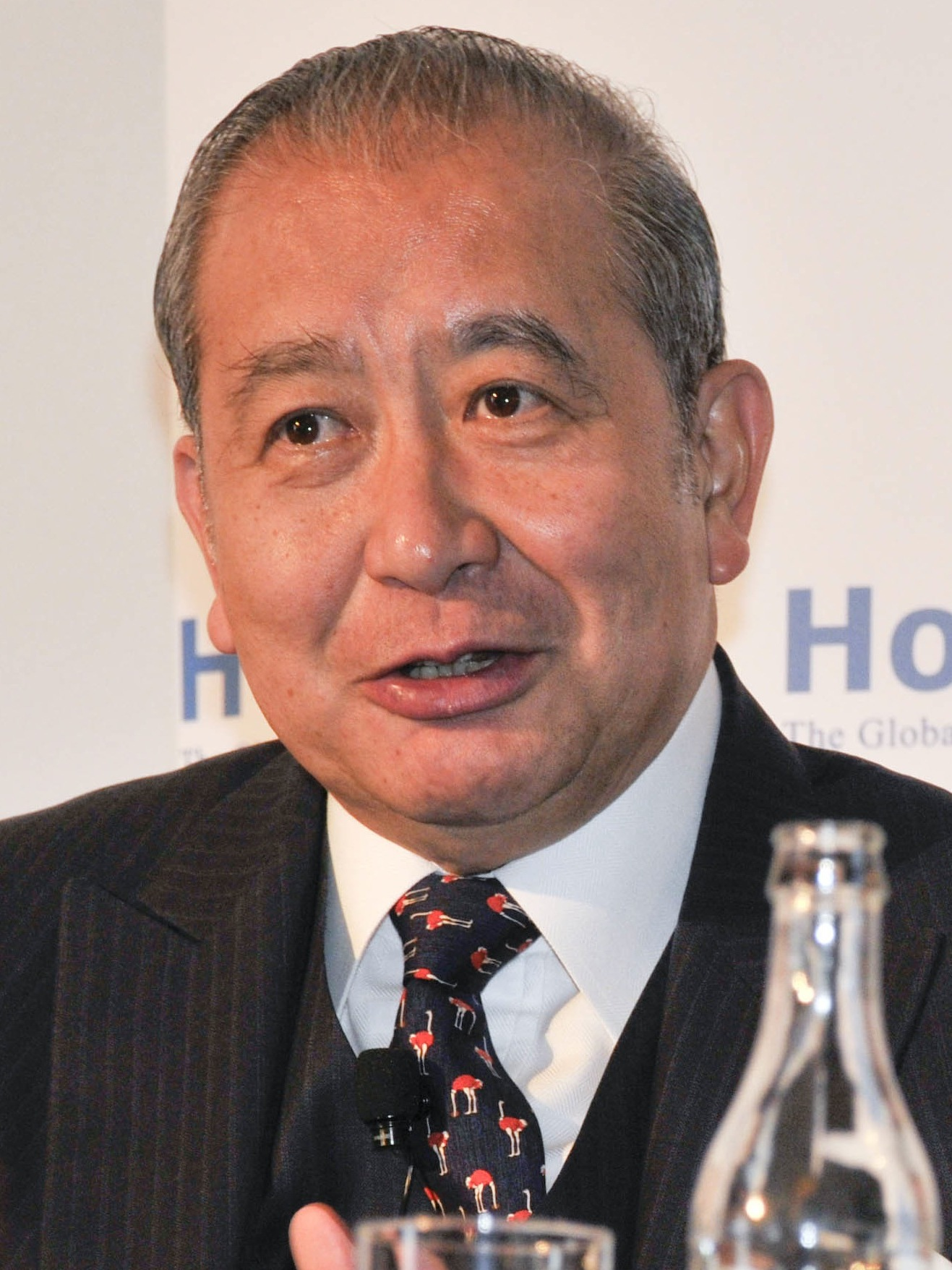
Sir David Li (banker)

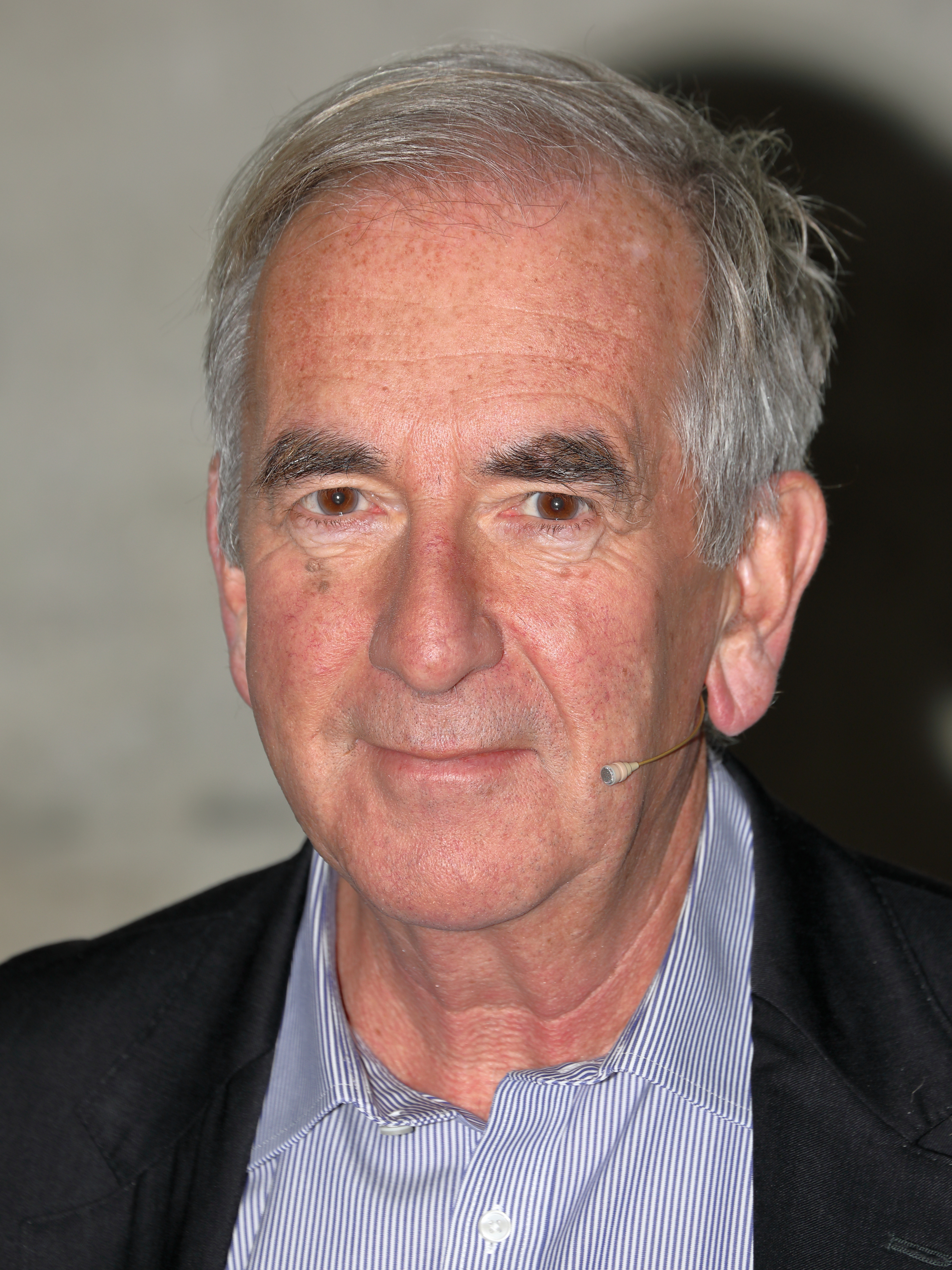
Robert Harris (author and historian)

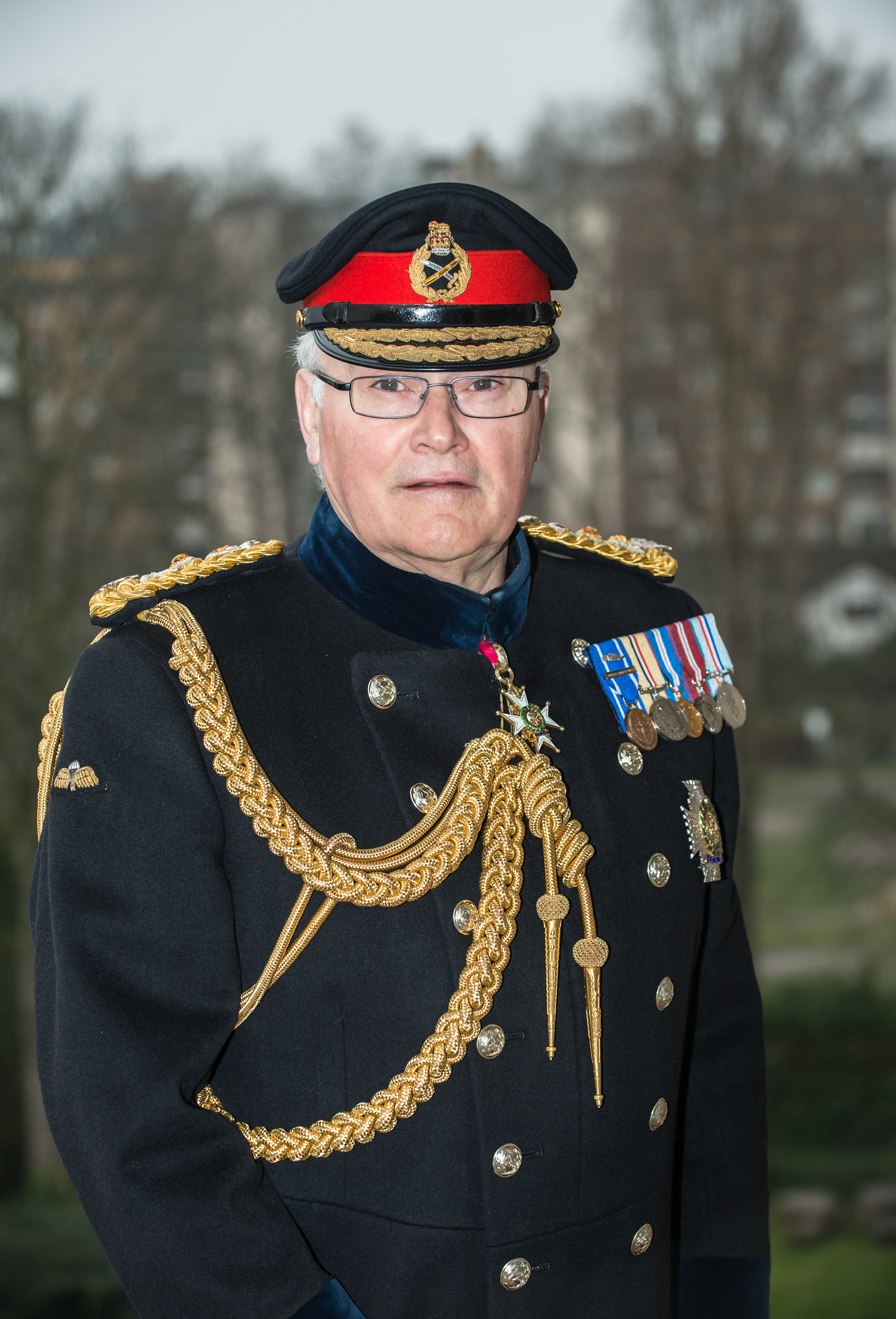
General Sir Peter Wall (Chief of the General Staff)

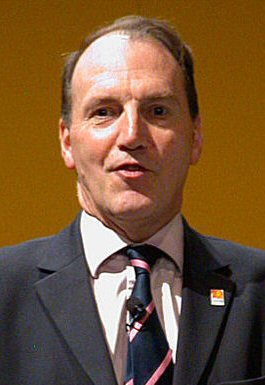
Sir Simon Hughes of the Liberal Democrats

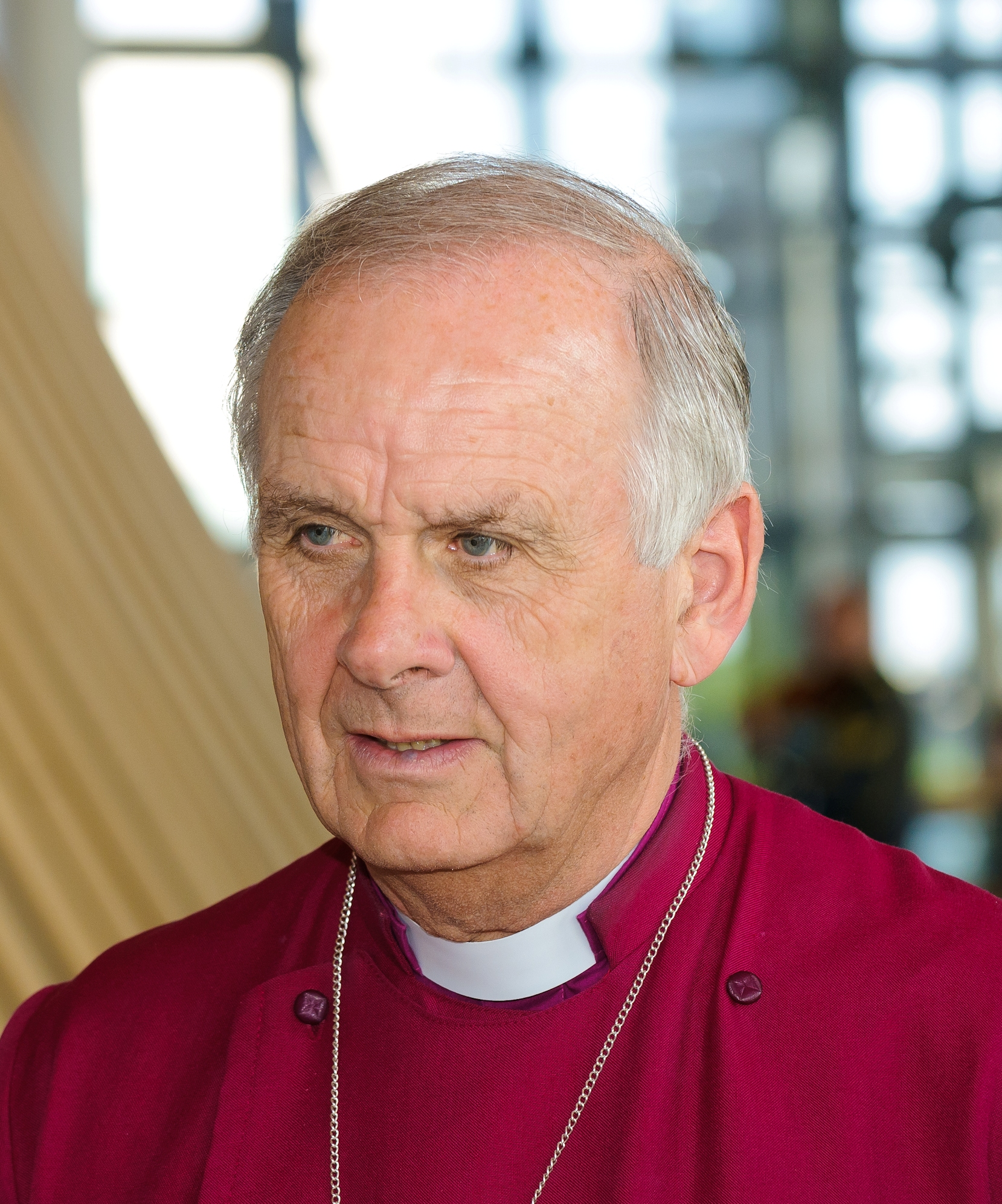
Barry Morgan (Archbishop of Wales)

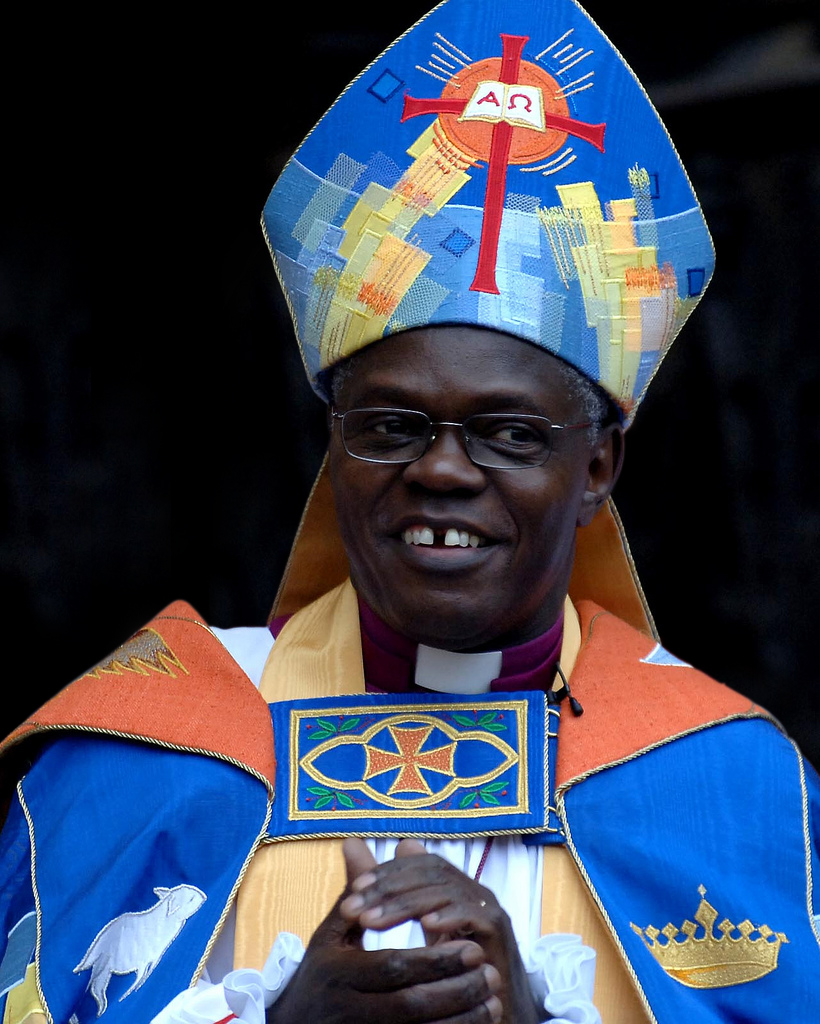
John Sentamu (Archbishop of York)

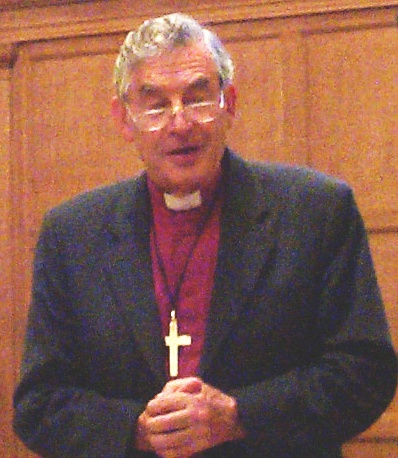
Richard Harries (Baron of Pentregarth and Bishop of Oxford)

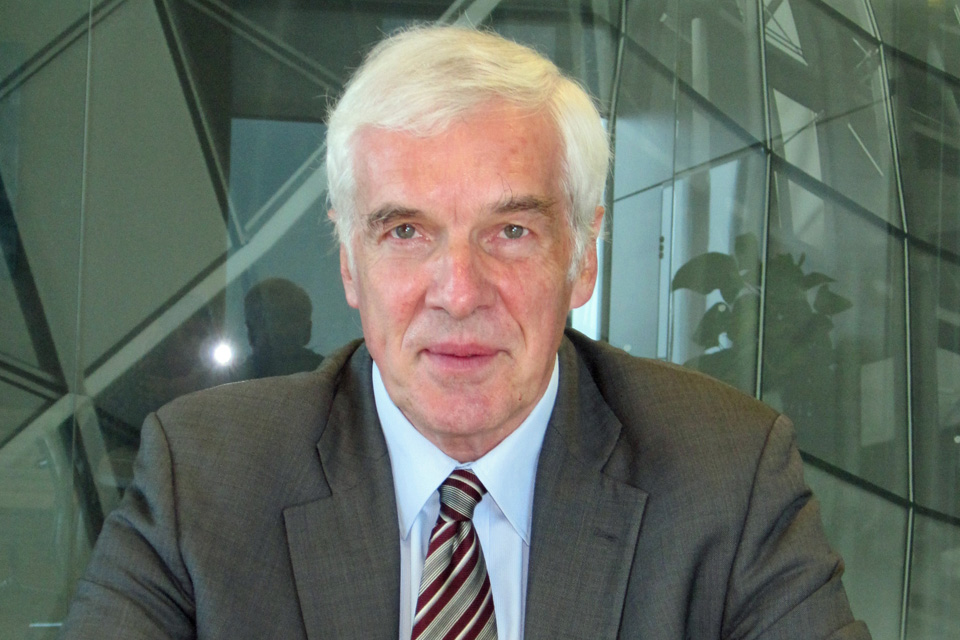
Peter Beckingham (Diplomat and Governor of the Turks and Caicos Islands)

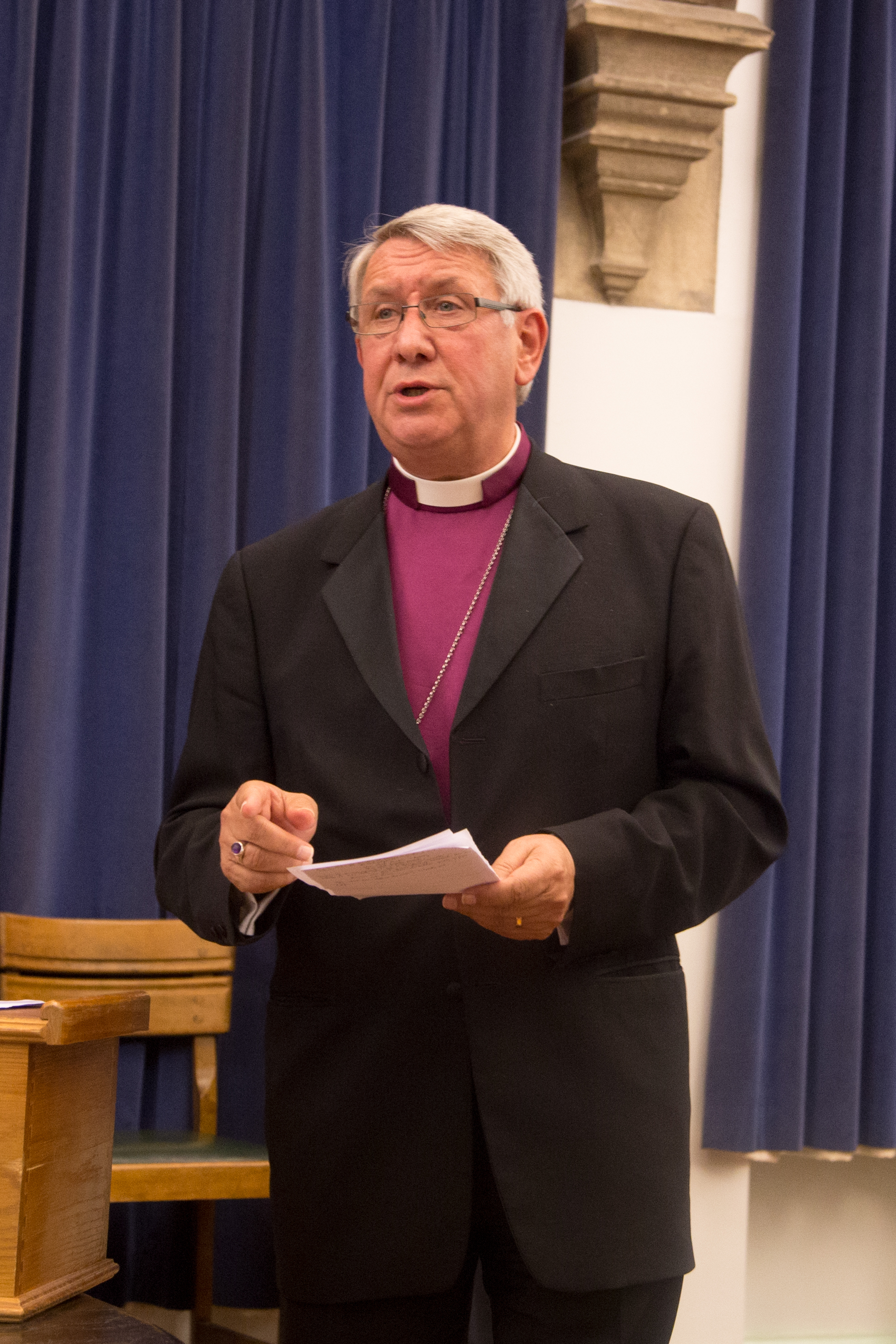
Tim Stevens (Convenor of the House of Lords and Bishop of Leicester)

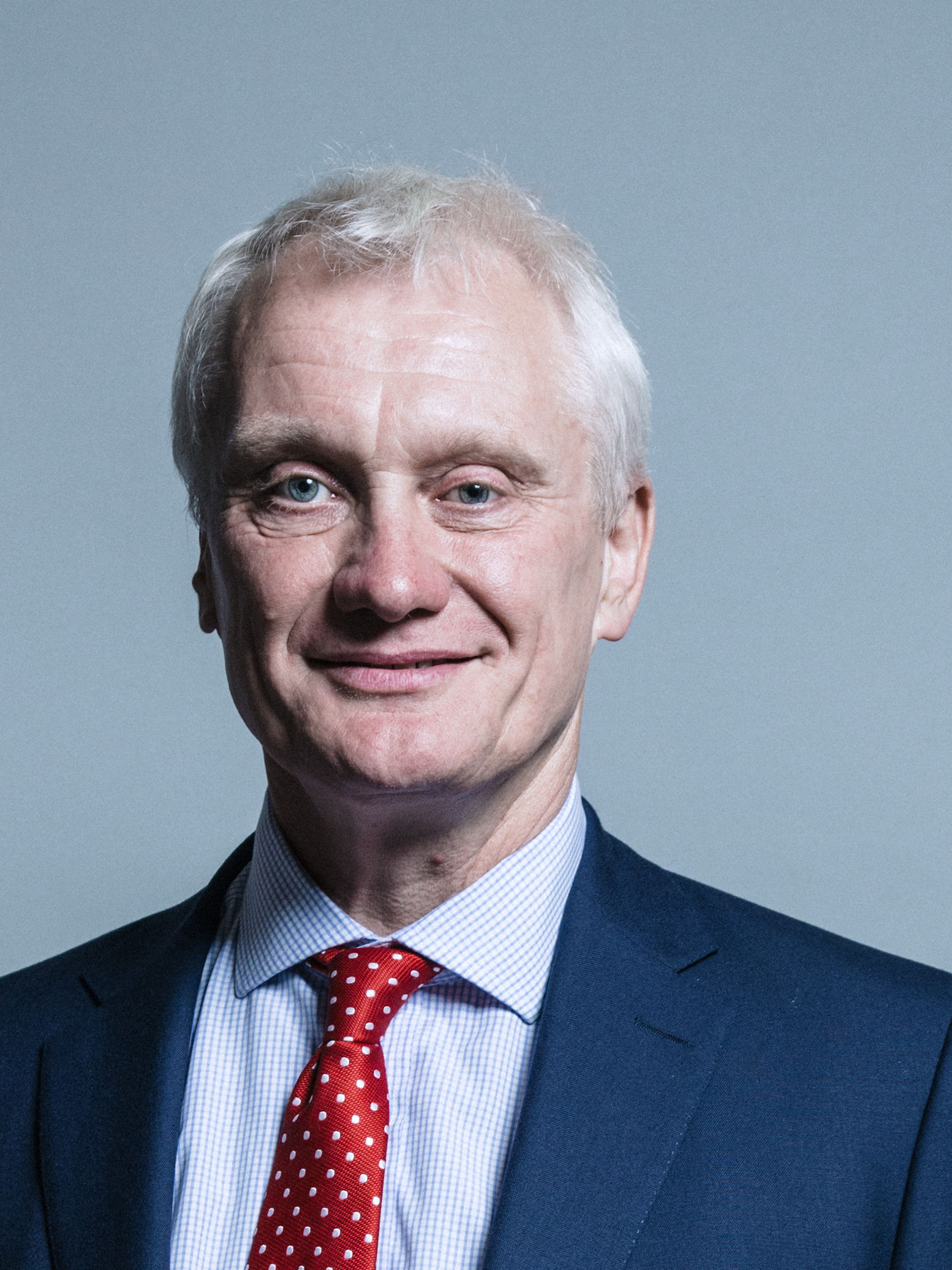
Graham Stuart (Conservative politician)

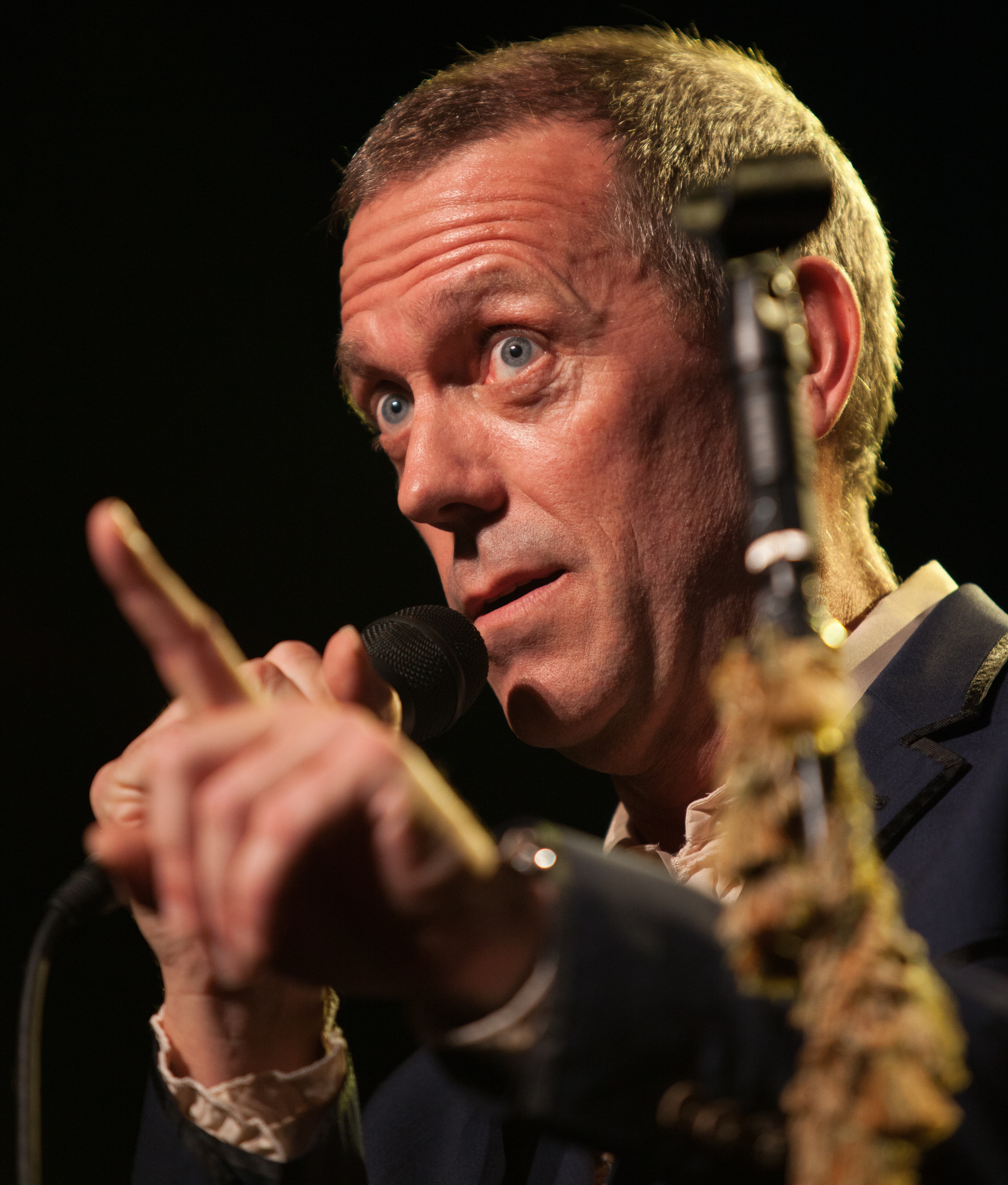
Hugh Laurie (actor)

Robert Lacey (Film/television historical advisor)

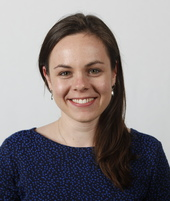
Kate Forbes (SNP Member of the Scottish Parliament)

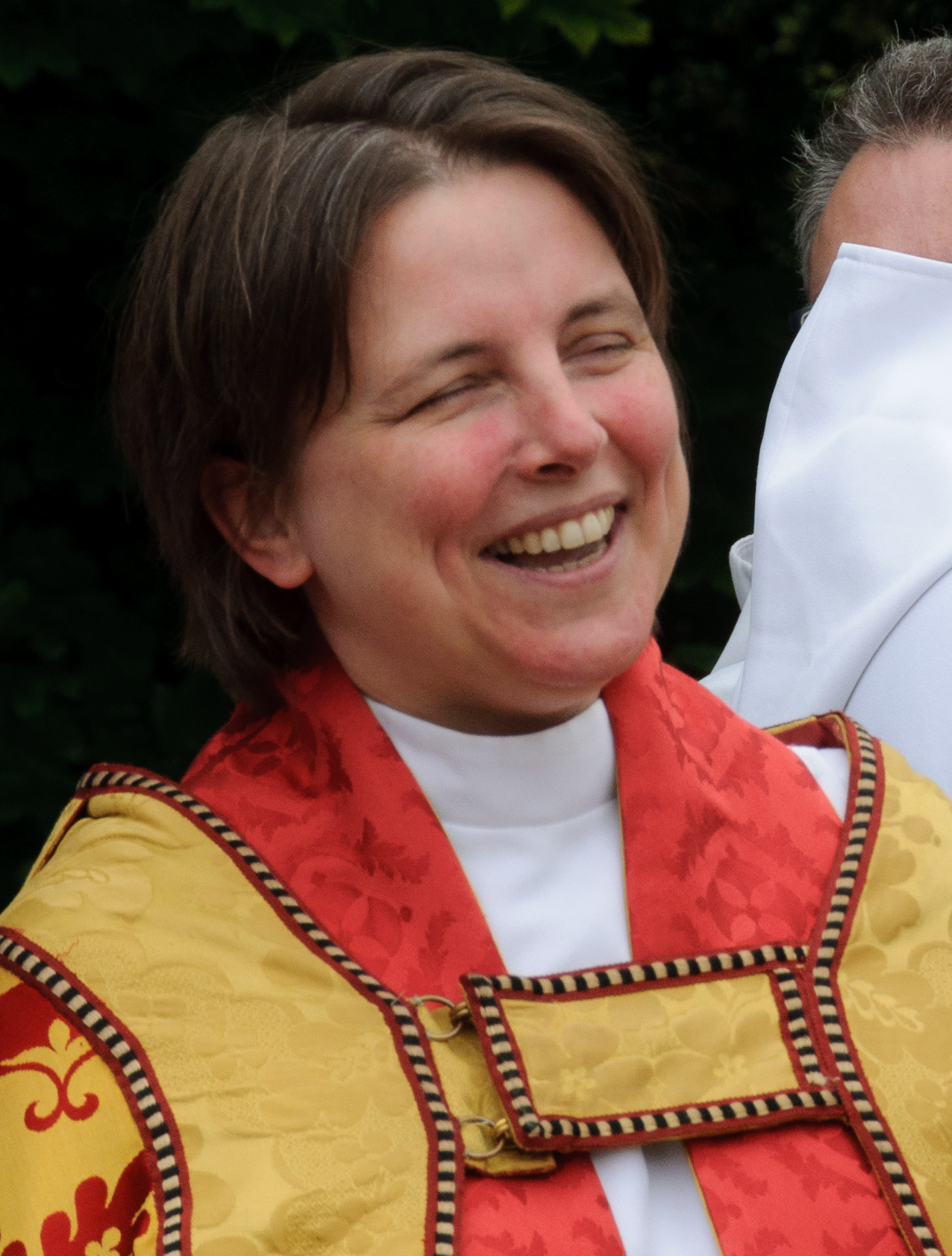
Lucy Winkett (Anglican priest)

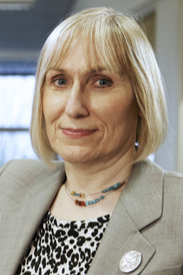
Sophie Wilson (Computing pioneer)

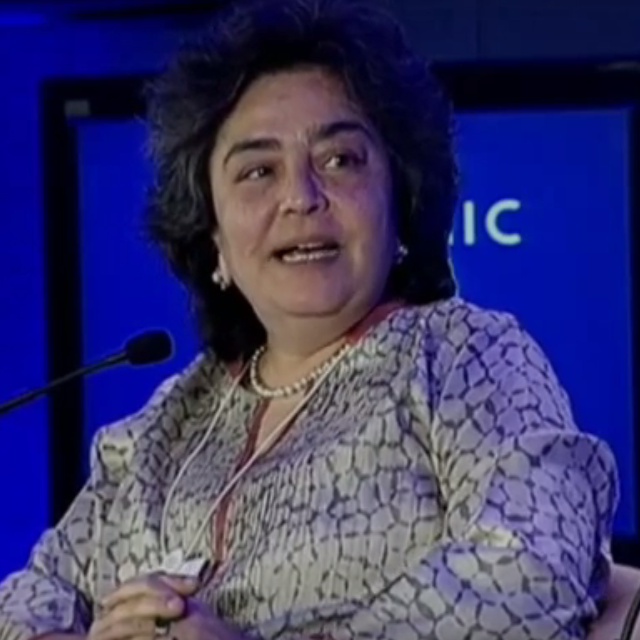
Zia Mody (Indian corporate lawyer)

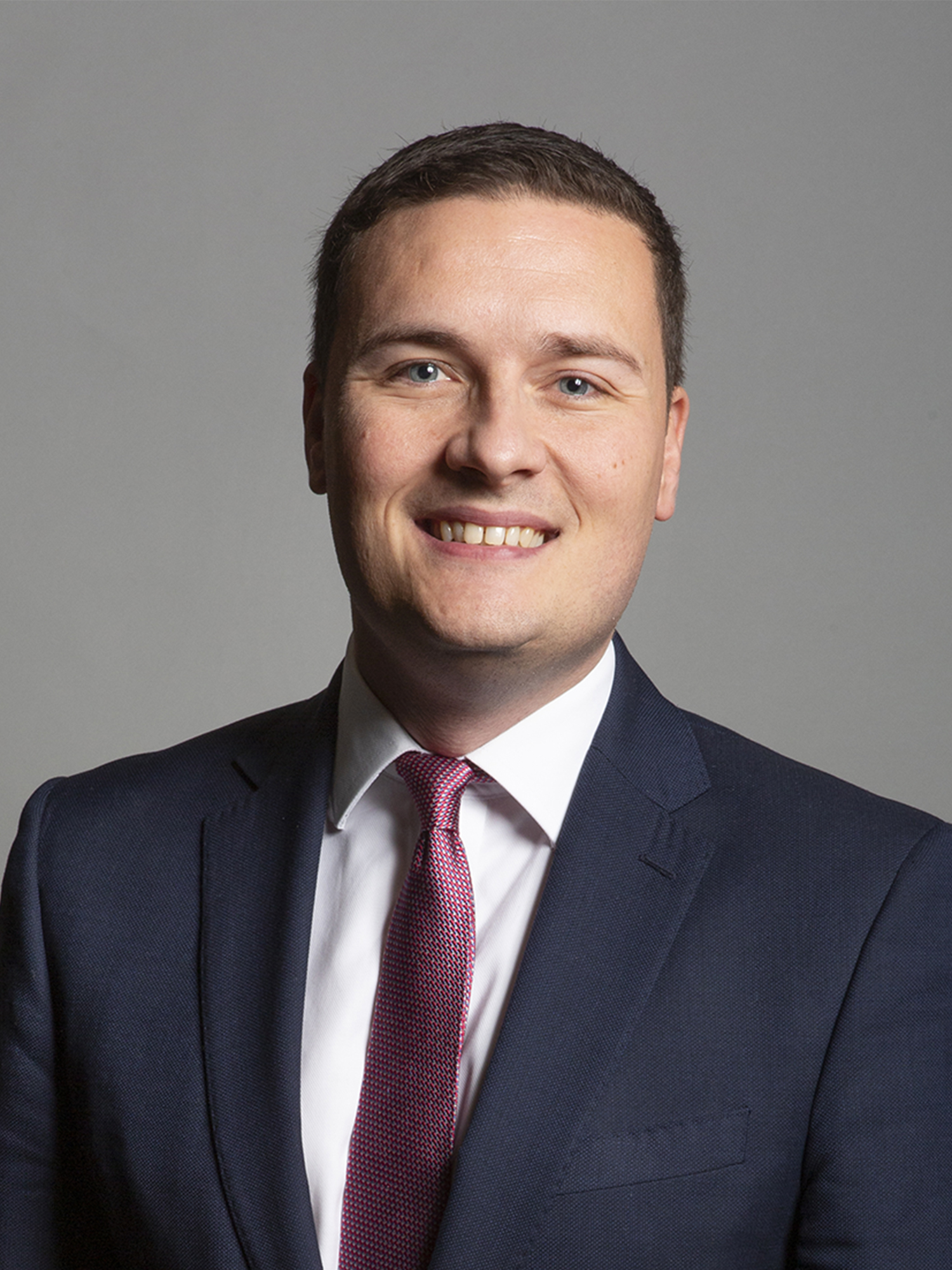
Wes Streeting (Secretary of State for Defence)

Name	Birth	Death	Career
Clive Anderson	1952		Comedian and television show host
Christina Baker Kline	1964		Novelist
Peter Beckingham	1949		Governor of the Turks and Caicos Islands
Richard Budgett	1959		1984 Olympic rowing gold medallist
Ralph Chubb	1892	1960	Poet and printer
Deryck Cooke	1919	1976	Musicologist and broadcaster
Brian Clegg	1955		Science author
A. R. Cornelius	1903	1991	Former Chief Justice of the Supreme Court of Pakistan
Huw Davies	1959		England Rugby fly-half 1981-86
Kate Forbes	1990		Member of the Scottish Parliament
Viv Groskop	1973		Journalist, writer and comedian
John Selwyn Gummer	1939		British politician
Peter Selwyn Gummer	1942		Businessman
Richard Harries	1936		Former Bishop of Oxford and life peer
Robert Harris	1957		Author
Tom Hollander	1967		Actor
Karl Hudson-Phillips	1933	2014	Judge
Simon Hughes	1951		Politician
Peter Matthew Hutton	1966		Sports media executive
Grayston "Bill" Ives	1948		Composer
Lionel Charles Knights	1906	1997	Literary critic
Robert Lacey	1944		Writer and historical advisor to Netflix's The Crown
Hugh Laurie	1959		Comedian and actor, son of Ran Laurie
Ran Laurie	1915	1998	1948 Olympic rowing gold medallist
Andrew Lawrence-King	1959		Musician
Sir David Li	1939		Chairman and Chief Executive of the Bank of East Asia
Ivan Lloyd-Phillips	1910	1984	Civil servant
Angus Maddison	1926	2010	Economist
Sir Richard May	1938	2004	Judge
David Miller	1946		Political theorist
Zia Mody	1956		Lawyer
Barry Morgan	1947		Archbishop of Wales
Malcolm Muggeridge	1903	1990	Author and journalist
Rob Newman	1964		Comedian
Nigel Newton	1955		Founder of Bloomsbury Publishing
Sir Andrew Nicol	1951	2026	Judge
Sir Edwin Nixon	1925	2008	Managing director of IBM (UK)
Julian Pearce			Bigsby Medal- and Murchison Medal-winning geochemist
Justine Picardie	1961		Novelist and writer
John Saunders	1953		Full international-level chess player and chess magazine editor
John Sentamu	1949		Archbishop of York
Sir Peter Singer	1944		Judge
Adrian Smith	1957		Statistician
Peter Smith	1952		Judge
Tim Stevens	1946		Bishop of Leicester
Wes Streeting	1983		Politician
Graham Stuart	1962		British politician
Amanda Thirsk	1965		Private secretary to Prince Andrew, Duke of York
David Thomson	1957		Member of Canada's wealthiest family
D. R. Thorpe	1943		Political biographer
Peter Wall	1955		Professional head of British Army
Stephen Wall	1947		Diplomat
George Weightman-Smith	1905	1972	Olympic athlete
Eley Williams	1986		Writer
Peter Williams	1945		Physicist
Tim Davie	1967		Director-General of the BBC
Sophie Wilson	1957		Computer scientist
Lucy Winkett	1968		Anglican priest

== See also ==
- Fellows of Selwyn College, Cambridge
- List of Masters of Selwyn College, Cambridge
- List of organ scholars
- Selwyn House School
- Listed buildings in Cambridge (west)
