= Wilf Hughes =

Welsh cricketer

Personal information
- Full name: David Wilfred Hughes
- Born: 12 July 1910; Ebbw Vale, Monmouthshire, Wales
- Died: 21 April 1984 (aged 73); Sarisbury Green, Hampshire, England
- Batting: Right-handed
- Bowling: Right-arm fast-medium

Domestic team information
- Years: Team
- 1946–1949: Dorset
- 1935–1938: Glamorgan

Career statistics
Competition	First-class
Matches	22
Runs scored	274
Batting average	10.96
100s/50s	–/1
Top score	70*
Balls bowled	2,873
Wickets	52
Bowling average	32.53
5 wickets in innings	2
10 wickets in match	–
Best bowling	5/70
Catches/stumpings	6/–
- Source: Cricinfo, 25 July 2011

David Wilfred Hughes (12 July 1910 – 21 April 1984) was a Welsh cricketer. Hughes was a right-handed batsman who bowled right-arm fast-medium. He was born in Ebbw Vale, Monmouthshire.

After studying science at Bangor University, Hughes became a teacher, taking up a teaching post in Northamptonshire. While teaching in Northamptonshire, he played club cricket for Kettering, with some success. His bowling later came to the attention of Glamorgan captain Maurice Turnbull when Glamorgan were in the county playing Northamptonshire, Turnbull being told about a Welsh cricketer who was getting "a bag of wickets every week". He was invited to Cardiff Arms Park for a trial, impressing enough to be given a contract to play in the summer holidays.

His first-class debut for Glamorgan against the touring South Africans in 1935 was an eventful one. In Glamorgan's second-innings Hughes, batting at number 11, scoring a quickfire unbeaten 70 runs as he and Cyril Smart put on 131 for the tenth wicket, to help save the match for Glamorgan. One of Hughes's sixes flew right out of the ground, across the road, and in through an upstairs window of the Grand Hotel opposite.

Hughes made a further 21 first-class appearances for Glamorgan, the last of which came against Leicestershire in the 1938 County Championship. As a bowler, he formed a useful partnership with the more experienced Jack Mercer. He took 52 wickets at an average of 32.53, with best figures of 5/70. These figures, one of two five-wicket hauls he took, came against Leicestershire in 1936. A hard hitting batsman, Hughes scored 274 runs at a batting average of 10.96, with a high score of 70 not out against the South Africans.

During World War II, Hughes had an emergency commission with the rank of 2nd Lieutenant in the Royal Regiment of Artillery. He later served as an Adjutant at the Royal School of Artillery at Larkhill, Wiltshire. Following the war, he took up a teaching position in Poole, Dorset, and did not appear again for Glamorgan. While based in Poole, he played for Dorset, making his debut in the 1946 Minor Counties Championship against Buckinghamshire. He made six further Minor Counties Championship appearances for Dorset, the last of which came against Oxfordshire in 1949.

He later moved to Peterborough, Cambridgeshire, where he ended his teaching career as the headmaster of a boys' school. He died in Sarisbury Green, Hampshire, on 21 April 1984.
