= Ivan Lloyd-Phillips =

Ivan Lloyd-Phillips CBE (June 1910 – 14 January 1984) was a British national who served in the Colonial Administrative Service. He was the son of Arthur Lloyd-Phillips, Vicar of Ware.

== Appointments ==
First appointed to the Colonial Service in 1934, with appointments to:

- Gold Coast (1934–1938);
- Palestine (1938–1947);
  - District Commissioner of Gaza District (1946–1947);
- Colonial Office (1947–1948);
- Cyprus (1948–1951);
- Commissioner, Nicosia-Kyrenia (1950–1951);
- Singapore (1951–1953);
  - Commissioner-General's Office (1951–1952);
  - Dep. Secretary for Defence (1952–1953);
- Malaya (1953–1962);
  - Secretary to Chief Minister and Minister for Home Affairs (1955–1957);
  - Secretary, Ministry of the Interior (1957–1962).

Later roles:

- Deputy Director, Oxford Colonial Records Project, Institute of Commonwealth Studies, University of Oxford, (1965–1970).

== Honours ==
- Officer of the Order of the British Empire (OBE; 1959)
- Commander of the Order of the British Empire (CBE; 1963)

== Education ==
- Selwyn College, Cambridge;
- Balliol College, Oxford (Doctor of Philosophy {DPhil}).

== Quotes ==
- What a fantastic mess we are all in, and how different the world would have been if only Hitler had gone to Balliol! (written to his father from Jerusalem in October 1939)
