= Matthew Mason (Welsh cricketer) =

Welsh cricketer (born 1984)

Matthew Barry Mason (born 24 November 1984 in Swansea) is a Welsh cricketer. Although he has made a number of appearances at second XI level for Glamorgan, as of the end of the 2006 season his only senior appearances had been three games in the C&G Trophy for Wales Minor Counties, in which he took a total of four wickets.

He also made several appearance for England Under 18's.
