= Timeline of British history (1950–1969) =

This article presents a timeline of events in the history of the United Kingdom from 1950 until 1969. For a narrative explaining the overall developments, see the related history of the British Isles. For narratives about this time period, see Post-war Britain (1945–1979), Social history of post-war Britain (1945–1979),

== United Kingdom ==
1950s
1950
1951
1952
1953
1954
1955
1956
1957
1958
1959

1960s
1960
1961
1962
1963
1964
1965
1966
1967
1968
1969

=== England ===
1950s
1950
1951
1952
1953
1954
1955
1956
1957
1958
1959

1960s
1960
1961
1962
1963
1964
1965
1966
1967
1968
1969

=== Scotland ===
1950s
1950
1951
1952
1953
1954
1955
1956
1957
1958
1959

1960s
1960
1961
1962
1963
1964
1965
1966
1967
1968
1969

=== Wales ===
1950s
1950
1951
1952
1953
1954
1955
1956
1957
1958
1959

1960s
1960
1961
1962
1963
1964
1965
1966
1967
1968
1969

== See also ==
- Timeline of British history
- History of England
- History of Northern Ireland
- History of Scotland
- History of Wales
- History of the United Kingdom
