= 1960 in Wales =

- Centuries: 18th; 19th; 20th; 21st
- Decades: 1940s; 1950s; 1960s; 1970s; 1980s
- See also: List of years in Wales; Timeline of Welsh history 1960 in The United Kingdom England Scotland Elsewhere

This article is about the particular significance of the year 1960 to Wales and its people.

== Incumbents ==
- Archbishop of Wales – Edwin Morris, Bishop of Monmouth
- Archdruid of the National Eisteddfod of Wales
  - William Morris (outgoing)
  - Trefin (incoming)

== Events ==
- 1 January – Portmeirion Pottery is established when Susan Williams-Ellis and her husband Euan Cooper-Willis (managers of the gift shop at her father's village of Portmeirion) take over Gray's Pottery in Stoke-on-Trent (England).
- 5 January – Closure of the Swansea and Mumbles Railway (opened to passengers in 1807 and by this date operated by double-deck electric trams). The service is replaced by buses operated by its owner South Wales Transport.
- 28 June – Forty-five miners are killed in an accident at Six Bells Colliery, Monmouthshire.
- 6 August – At Llandaff Cathedral a service of thanksgiving attended by Queen Elizabeth II is held to mark the end of eleven years' restoration work following air raid damage in 1941.
- 5 September – Poet and peace campaigner Waldo Williams is sentenced at Haverfordwest to imprisonment for six weeks for non-payment of income tax (a protest against defence spending).
- 3 November – Esso opens the first oil refinery at Milford Haven.

== Arts and literature ==
- 29 September – Ricky Valance is the first male Welsh singer to hit number one in the charts, with his cover version of Tell Laura I Love Her.

=== Awards ===
- National Eisteddfod of Wales (held in Cardiff)
- National Eisteddfod of Wales: Chair – withheld
- National Eisteddfod of Wales: Crown – W. J. Gruffydd, "Unigedd"
- National Eisteddfod of Wales: Prose Medal – Rhiannon Davies Jones, Fe Hen Lyfr Cownt

=== New books ===
- Glyn M. Ashton – Tipyn o Annwyd
- Thomas Glynne Davies – Haf Creulon
- Menna Gallie – Man's Desiring
- Dic Jones – Agor Grwn
- Kate Roberts – Y Lôn Wen
- Bernice Rubens – Set on Edge
- Raymond Williams – Border Country

=== New drama ===
- Saunders Lewis – Esther

=== Music ===
- Alun Hoddinott – Concerto no. 2
- Arwel Hughes – Serch yw’r Doctor (opera)

==== Albums ====
- Osian Ellis – Handel (with the Philomusica of London conducted by Granville Jones
- Treorchy Male Choir – Nidaros
- Die Zauberflöte (featuring Geraint Evans)

== Film ==
- Glynis Johns stars in The Sundowners.
- Rachel Roberts stars in Saturday Night and Sunday Morning, becoming the first Welsh actress to win a BAFTA for Best British Actress.
- Keith Baxter appears alongside Orson Welles in Chimes at Midnight.

== Broadcasting ==
September – The Wales Television Association is formed. On 6 June, the franchise is awarded to the Wales Television Association.

=== Welsh-language television ===
- Colegau Cerdd
- Her Yr Ifanc

=== English-language television ===
- 1 January – Broadcast of the first weekly episode of an eight-part serialization by BBC Wales of How Green Was My Valley.
- Johnny Morris narrates the imported children's TV series Tales of the Riverbank.

== Sport ==
- Boxing – Dick Richardson wins the European Heavyweight title. Brian Curvis wins the British and Commonwealth welterweight titles.
- Summer Olympics – David Broome wins a bronze medal on Sunsalve in the individual show jumping event.
- Tennis – Mike Davies wins the British hard court title. He also becomes the first Welsh man to reach a Wimbledon final where he partners Bobby Wilson in the Men's Doubles.
- BBC Wales Sports Personality of the Year – Brian Curvis

== Births ==
- January – Anne Boden, banking executive
- 16 January – Alun Huw Davies, vascular surgeon
- 30 January – Peter Black AM, politician (in Wirral)
- 6 February – Jeremy Bowen, journalist and television presenter
- 14 February – Dawn Bowden, politician
- 15 February – Russell Coughlin, footballer (d. 2016)
- 18 February – Rhys Parry Jones, actor
- 26 February – Roger Lewis, academic, biographer and journalist
- 30 April – Martin Phillips, darts player
- 3 May – Geraint Davies, politician
- 4 May – Elfyn Edwards, golfer
- 8 May – Peter Lawlor, cricketer
- 9 May – Jillian Lane, spiritual medium (d. 2013)
- 13 June – Sir Clive Buckland Lewis, judge
- 19 June – Andrew Dilnot, economist, statistician and academic
- 23 June – Ricky Evans, rugby union player
- 29 June – Helen Mary Jones, politician (in Colchester)
- 13 July – Ian Hislop, satirist
- 24 July – Gwilym Emyr Owen III, US-born singer-songwriter of Welsh descent
- 1 August – Lesley Griffiths, politician
- 18 September
  - Carolyn Harris, politician
  - Ian Lucas, politician
- 29 October – Sue Jones, Dean of Liverpool
- 12 December – Kelvin Smart, flyweight boxer
- 24 December – Carol Vorderman, television personality (in Bedford)
- date unknown
  - Nigel Davies, chess player
  - Lisa Francis, politician
  - Gareth Jones, orchestral and choral conductor
  - Malcolm Pryce, novelist (in Shrewsbury)
  - William Owen Roberts, novelist and dramatist

== Deaths ==
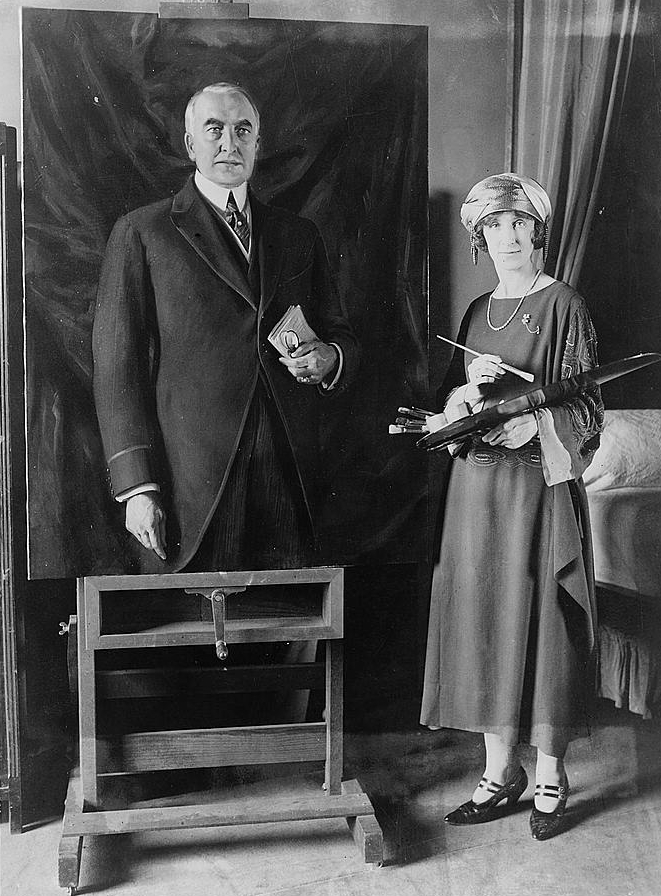
Margaret Lindsay Williams, died 4 June

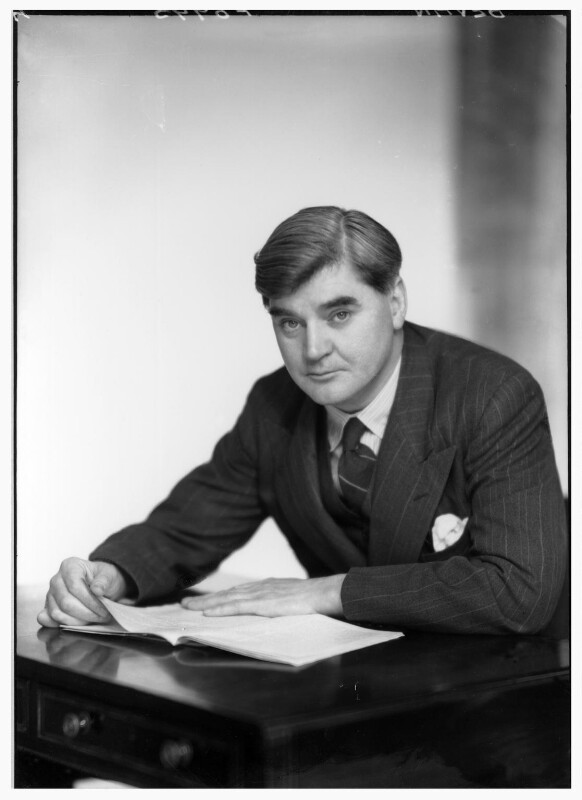
Aneurin Bevan, died 6 July

- 2 January – Leila Megàne, opera singer, c. 69
- 13 January – Reginald Herbert, 15th Earl of Pembroke, 79
- 17 January – E. Llwyd Williams, minister and poet, 53
- 19 January – Charles Jones, Wales rugby international, 66
- 27 January – Joseph "Joe" Jones, dual-code rugby international, 60
- 25 February – Sir Edward Enoch Jenkins, judge, 65
- 30 March – Edward Evans, politician and disability campaigner, 77
- 11 April – William Llewellyn Morgan, Wales international rugby union player, 76
- 7 May – Mai Jones, songwriter, 61
- 23 May – John Edwards, politician, 77
- 4 June – Margaret Lindsay Williams, artist, 71
- 19 June – Thomas Alwyn Lloyd, architect, 78
- 27 June – Harry Pollitt, politician, 69
- 30 June – John Morgan Lloyd, musician and composer, 79
- 6 July – Aneurin Bevan, politician, 62
- 9 July – John Dyke, Wales international rugby union player, 76
- 24 August – Dai Edwards, Wales dual-code rugby international, 64
- 25 August – Tommy Jones-Davies, Wales international rugby player, 54
- 30 August – "Taffy" Jones, First World War flying ace, 64
- 31 August – Edith Picton-Turbervill, social reformer, writer and politician, 88
- 3 September – Frank Hawkins, rugby international, 75
- 27 September – George Morgan Trefgarne, 1st Baron Trefgarne, politician, 66
- 29 October – Horace Williams, footballer, c. 60
- 19 December
  - Billy Bowen, dual-code rugby player, 63
  - Helen Parry Eden, Welsh-descended poet, 75
- 20 December – Harry Uzzell, Wales international rugby union captain, 77
- 22 December – Evan Davies, politician, 85

== See also ==
- 1960 in Northern Ireland
