= 1961 in Wales =

- Centuries: 18th; 19th; 20th; 21st
- Decades: 1940s; 1950s; 1960s; 1970s; 1980s
- See also: List of years in Wales; Timeline of Welsh history 1961 in The United Kingdom Scotland Elsewhere

This article is about the significance of the year 1961 to Wales and its people.

== Incumbents ==
- Archbishop of Wales – Edwin Morris, Bishop of Monmouth
- Archdruid of the National Eisteddfod of Wales – Trefin

== Events ==
- 16 February – The BP Explorer, a loaded tanker barge bound for Sharpness from Swansea, turns over in the Severn Estuary.
- 17 February – The BP Explorer is seen bouncing upside down through the recently wrecked (October 26, 1960) Severn Railway Bridge. Her crew of five men are killed.
- 1 October – Tabernacle Chapel, Cardiff, hosts the first-ever broadcast of the long-running national BBC Television series Songs of Praise.
- 8 November – In a referendum on Sunday opening of public houses, the counties of Anglesey, Cardiganshire, Caernarfonshire, Carmarthenshire, Denbighshire, Merionethshire, Montgomeryshire and Pembrokeshire all vote to stay "dry".
- 9 November – Rosemarie Frankland, originally from Rhosllanerchrugog, wins the Miss World title.
- 19 November – During construction of the Severn Bridge three men fall into the river. A rescue boat crewed by two men sets sail from Chepstow, not knowing that the three men have been picked up safely by a ferry, the Severn Princess. Two empty tanker barges coming down from Sharpness collide with the rescue boat, which has no navigation lights. One member of the rescue boat crew is drowned.
- The Llyn Celyn reservoir is constructed in the valley of the River Tryweryn in North Wales to provide water for Liverpool, destroying the village of Capel Celyn.
- Gwynfor Evans becomes president of the Celtic League.
- Formation in Pontypridd of the first Local Spiritual Assembly of the Baháʼí Faith entirely of native Welsh Baháʼís.

== Arts and literature ==
- Keith Baxter makes his Broadway debut as King Henry VIII in A Man for All Seasons.

=== Awards ===
National Eisteddfod of Wales, held in Rhosllanerchrugog:

- Chairing of the Bard – Emrys Edwards
- Crowning of the Bard – L. Haydn Lewis
- Prose Medal – withheld
- Gold Medal: Fine Art – Ceri Richards

=== New books ===
==== English language ====
- Dannie Abse – The Eccentric
- Richard Hughes – The Fox in the Attic
- Bertrand Russell – Fact and Fiction
- Emlyn Williams – George
- Raymond Williams – The Long Revolution

==== Welsh language ====
- Pennar Davies – Yr Efrydd o Lyn Cynon
- Islwyn Ffowc Elis – Tabyrddau'r Tabongo
- W. J. Gruffydd (Elerydd) – Ffenestri
- Caradog Prichard – Un Nos Ola Leuad

=== Music ===
- Alun Hoddinott – Concerto for Piano, Winds and Percussion

== Film ==
- Ronald Lewis stars in Scream of Fear and Stop Me Before I Kill.
- Victor Spinetti makes his screen debut in The Gentle Terror.
- Clifford Evans stars in The Curse of the Werewolf.
- Pirates of Tortuga, American adventure based on the Welsh privateer, Henry Morgan

== Broadcasting ==
=== Welsh-language television ===
- Ambell i Gan
- Pwt o'r Papur
- Gair o Gyngor

=== English-language television ===
- 7 April – The Independent Television Authority (ITA) invites bids for its west and north Wales licence. On 6 June, the franchise is awarded to the Wales Television Association.
- 20 June – The Postmaster General of the United Kingdom, Reginald Bevins, informs the Wales Television Association that approval has been given for an ITA transmitter in the Flint-Denbigh area.

== Sport ==
- Boxing – Howard Winstone wins the British featherweight title.
- BBC Wales Sports Personality of the Year – Bryn Meredith

== Births ==
- 24 January – Tarki Micallef, professional footballer
- 7 May – Phil Campbell, rock guitarist
- 5 July – Gareth Jones ("Gaz Top"), television presenter
- 7 July – Steve Brace, long-distance runner
- 8 August – Simon Weston, war hero
- 18 August – Huw Edwards, newsreader
- 30 August
  - Denise Gyngell, pop singer and actress
  - Delyth Morgan, Baroness Morgan of Drefelin, charity worker and Labour peer
- 29 September – Julia Gillard, Prime Minister of Australia (in Barry)
- 20 October – Ian Rush, footballer
- 1 November – Nicky Grist, racing driver
- date unknown
  - Ifor ap Glyn, Welsh-language poet and television presenter
  - Twm Morys, poet

== Deaths ==
- 14 January – William Bowen, Army officer, 62
- 18 January – William Jones, poet, 64
- 2 February – Kate Williams Evans, suffragette, 84
- 10 February
  - Tom Beynon, Presbyterian minister and historian, 74
  - Llewelyn Davies, footballer, 80
- 18 April – John Evans, Labour politician, 85
- 8 May – Wyndham Edwards, gymnast, 68
- 28 June – Huw Menai, poet, 74
- 3 July – Albert Jenkin, Wales international rugby player, 88
- 14 August – Alec James, cricketer, 72
- 31 October – Augustus John, painter, 83
- 20 November – Edwin Thomas Maynard, Wales international rugby player, 83
- 4 December – John Pugh, Archdeacon of Carmarthen, 76

== See also ==
- 1961 in Northern Ireland
- 1961 in Scotland
- 1961 in the United Kingdom
