= 1967 in Wales =

- Centuries: 18th; 19th; 20th; 21st
- Decades: 1940s; 1950s; 1960s; 1970s; 1980s
- See also: List of years in Wales; Timeline of Welsh history 1967 in The United Kingdom Scotland Elsewhere

‘Faraday’ at the Newport Power Station - 1967

This article is about the particular significance of the year 1967 to Wales and its people.

== Incumbents ==
- Secretary of State for Wales – Cledwyn Hughes
- Archbishop of Wales – Edwin Morris, Bishop of Monmouth
- Archdruid of the National Eisteddfod of Wales – E. Gwyndaf Evans

== Events ==
- 20 February – The first Royal Mail postbus in Britain runs between Llanidloes and Llangurig.
- April – Rhodri Morgan marries fellow Welsh Labour MP Julie Edwards.
- 13 April – Tri-annual county council elections take place across Wales.
- 5 May – The Brynglas Tunnels on the M4 motorway by-passing Newport are opened.
- 8 May – Local elections take place across the county boroughs and districts, with the Labour Party losing its majority on Ebbw Vale Urban Council for the first time in 30 years.
- 27 July – The Welsh Language Act 1967 allows the use of Welsh in legal proceedings and official documents, and repeals the Wales and Berwick Act 1746, which had officially defined Wales as part of England.
- 7 August – Two men and a boy are drowned in the Dyfi estuary.
- 25–27 August – The Beatles, along with Mick Jagger, Cilla Black, and Jane Asher, come to Bangor to attend a seminar by Maharishi Mahesh Yogi on Transcendental Meditation. Their visit is cut short by the shock news of manager Brian Epstein's death.
- 2 October – The new Passport Office opens in Newport as part of a United Kingdom government effort to move government offices into the regions.
- 25 October - Foot and Mouth Disease breaks out in North Wales and parts of England.
- November - HM Land Registry opens an office in Swansea.
- 18 December – Newtown, Montgomeryshire, is designated as a New Town. The River Severn is re-channelled to prevent the town becoming further damaged by floods.
- date unknown
  - The Gittins Report on Primary Education in Wales recommends that "every child should be given sufficient opportunity to be reasonably bilingual by the end of the primary stage".
  - Merched y Wawr is founded in the village of Parc near Bala, by language campaigner Zonia Bowen, after the Women's Institute refused to allow the Welsh language to be used.
  - The University of Wales Institute of Science and Technology (UWIST) in Cardiff is incorporated by charter; it later becomes part of the University of Wales.
  - The former Royal Navy Propellant Factory, Caerwent, RAF Caerwent weapons storage facility, is transferred to United States administration.
  - The Clywedog Reservoir is completed.
  - Francis Jones is appointed to the newly-formed Prince of Wales ' Investiture Committee.

== Arts and literature ==
- The first Welsh pantomime is put on by Theatr Felinfach, based on the life of Twm Siôn Cati.
- Rhys Davies wins an Edgar Allan Poe Award for his story "The Chosen One", originally published in The New Yorker.
- The publisher Y Lolfa is established by Robat Gruffudd in Tal-y-bont, Ceredigion.

=== Awards ===
- National Eisteddfod of Wales (held in Bala)
- National Eisteddfod of Wales: Chair – Emrys Roberts, "Y Gwyddonydd"
- National Eisteddfod of Wales: Crown – Eluned Phillips, "Corlannau"
- National Eisteddfod of Wales: Prose Medal – withheld

=== New books ===
==== English language ====
- Alan Garner – The Owl Service
- Leslie Norris – Finding Gold
- Bertrand Russell – War Crimes in Vietnam
- Emlyn Williams – Beyond Belief: A Chronicle of Murder and Its Detection

==== Welsh language ====
- Hydwedd Boyer – I'r Ynysoedd
- Brinley Richards – Cerddi'r Dyffryn
- Kate Roberts – Tegwch y Bore
- William Nantlais Williams – O Gopa Bryn Nefo

=== New drama ===
- Saunders Lewis – Cymru Fydd

=== Music ===
- Hogia'r Wyddfa – Tylluanod (album)
- Mary Hopkin – Mae Pob Awr
- Arwel Hughes – Mab y Dyn (cantata)
- Jeffrey Lewis – Epitaphium – Children of the Sun
- William Mathias – Sinfonietta
- Toni ac Aloma – Caffi Gaerwen
- Y Triban – Paid â dodi dadi ar y dôl
- Y Blew – Maes B

== Film ==
- Richard Burton stars in The Taming of the Shrew opposite his wife Elizabeth Taylor.
- Carry On up the Khyber is filmed in North Wales.

== Broadcasting ==
=== Welsh-language television ===
- Disc a Dawn

=== English-language television ===
- Conqueror's Road (drama series)
- The Shepherds of Moel Siabod (documentary)
- The Prisoner, filmed at Portmeirion
- The cast and crew of Doctor Who film the serial The Abominable Snowmen at Nant Ffrancon, doubling for Tibet.

== Sport ==
- Boxing – June 15: Howard Winstone is controversially defeated on points by Mexico's Vincente Saldivar at Ninian Park, Cardiff.
- Cricket – Glamorgan County Cricket Club moves to a new home at Sophia Gardens, Cardiff.
- Cross-country – The 1967 International Cross Country Championships are held at Barry.
- Gymnastics – Bobby Williams of Swansea is British champion.
- Rugby union – Barry John and Gareth Edwards make their international debut.
- Swimming – Paul Radmilovic is the first Briton to be elected to the American Swimming Hall of Fame.
- BBC Wales Sports Personality of the Year – Howard Winstone

== Births ==
- 7 February – Richie Burnett, darts player
- 16 February – Eluned Morgan, Baroness Morgan of Ely, politician
- 18 February – Colin Jackson CBE, athlete
- 22 February – Wayne Curtis, footballer
- 1 March – Steffan Rhodri, screen actor
- 21 March – Carwyn Jones, politician
- 27 March – Bob Morgan, Olympic diver
- 5 April – Andy Allen, rugby player
- 8 April – Arwyn Davies, Welsh actor
- 10 May – Jon Ronson, journalist and documentary filmmaker
- 9 July
  - Julie Thomas, lawn bowler
  - Richard Webster, rugby player
- 22 July – Rhys Ifans, actor and musician
- 7 September – Steve James, cricketer
- 13 October – Steve O'Shaughnessy, footballer
- 27 October – Jason Gummer, footballer
- 12 November – Grant Nicholas, musician
- 18 November – Zoë Skoulding, poet and musician
- 27 November – Geraint Rees, neurologist
- date unknown
  - Robert Huw Morgan, organist and choral conductor

== Deaths ==
- 7 January
  - Vince Griffiths, rugby player, 65
  - Sir Frederick Rees, Welsh historian and academic, 83
- 15 January – Sir Cyril Fox, archaeologist, 84
- 22 January
  - Idris Bell, papyrologist and author, 87
  - Mary Myfanwy Wood, missionary, 84
- 28 January – Cliff Davies, Wales international rugby player, 47
- 2 February – Griffith Griffith, Presbyterian leader, 83
- 14 February – Gwilym Lloyd George, 1st Viscount Tenby, politician, 70
- 18 February – Gwynno James, Dean of Brecon, 54
- 7 March – Percy Morris, trade unionist and politician, 73
- 11 March
  - Rupert Davies, Welsh-Canadian author, editor, newspaper publisher, and politician, 87
  - Ivor Rees, Victoria Cross recipient, 73
- 26 April – W. J. A. Davies, rugby player, 76
- 5 May – Owen Thomas Jones, geologist, 89
- 27 June – David Thomas, educationalist, writer and politician, 86
- 29 July – Jack Wetter, Wales international rugby union captain, 79
- 30 July – George Littlewood Hirst, Wales international rugby player, 77
- 15 September
  - Rhys Gabe, Wales international rugby union captain, 87
  - Enid Wyn Jones, nurse, 68
- 18 September – William Davies, dual-code rugby player, 76
- 8 October – Vernon Watkins, poet, 61
- 9 October – Edward Tegla Davies, clergyman and writer, 87
- 22 October – William Joseph Rhys, writer, 87
- 29 October – Bobbie Williams, rugby player, 71?
- 2 November – Robert John Rowlands ("Meuryn"), poet, 87
- 25 November – Tom Parker, Welsh international rugby union captain, 76
- 11 December – Florrie Evans, revivalist and missionary, 82
- 12 December – Tommy Bamford, footballer, 62
- 30 December – Ronald Lewis, operatic baritone, 51 (cancer)
- 31 December – Watkin William Price, historian and activist, 94
- date unknown
  - Len Apsey, footballer, 57
  - Colin Jones, artist, 38

== See also ==
- 1967 in Northern Ireland
