= 1962 in Wales =

- Centuries: 18th; 19th; 20th; 21st
- Decades: 1940s; 1950s; 1960s; 1970s; 1980s
- See also: List of years in Wales; Timeline of Welsh history 1962 in The United Kingdom Scotland Elsewhere

This article is about the particular significance of the year 1962 to Wales and its people.

== Incumbents ==
- Archbishop of Wales – Edwin Morris, Bishop of Monmouth
- Archdruid of the National Eisteddfod of Wales – Trefin

== Events ==
- January–April – An outbreak of smallpox spreading from Cardiff infects 45 people and kills 19 in south Wales; 900,000 people in the region are vaccinated against the disease.
- 12 April – Nine miners are killed and nine injured in an accident at Tower Colliery, Hirwaun, Wales.
- 15 May – Emlyn Hooson wins the Montgomeryshire by-election brought about by the death of Clement Davies. In the run-up to the by-election, the "Elvis Rock" is painted with the graffiti "Elis" by supporters of Plaid Cymru candidate Islwyn Ffowc Elis.
- 20 July – The world's first regular passenger hovercraft service is introduced between Rhyl and Wallasey.
- 4 August – Cymdeithas yr Iaith Gymraeg, the Welsh Language Society, is founded.
- September – Ysgol Gyfun Rhydfelen, the first Welsh-medium secondary school in south Wales, opens its doors.
- 19 September – Atlantic College opens its doors for the first time at St Donat's Castle, marking the birth of the pioneering United World College educational movement.
- 26 October – Richard Thomas and Baldwins's new steelworks at Llanwern near Newport, is officially opened by Queen Elizabeth II of the United Kingdom.
- 28 October – Chepstow Railway Bridge rebuilding completed.
- date unknown
  - Richard Booth opens his first second-hand bookshop at the old fire station in Hay-on-Wye.
  - Cardiff Zoo opened.

== Arts and literature ==
- 21 March – Actress Rachel Roberts marries Rex Harrison in Genoa.
- Gwyn Thomas becomes a full-time writer and produces his first stage play, The Keep.
- Welsh National Opera launches a training scheme for singers.
- Dick Francis publishes his first thriller, Dead Cert.

=== Awards ===
- National Eisteddfod of Wales (held in Llanelli)
- National Eisteddfod of Wales: Chair – Caradog Prichard, "Llef un yn Llefain"
- National Eisteddfod of Wales: Crown – D. Emlyn Lewis, Y Cwmwl
- National Eisteddfod of Wales: Prose Medal – William Owen, Bu Farw Ezra Bebb

=== New books ===
- Clifford Dyment – The Railway Game
- Michael Foot – Aneurin Bevan, vol. 1
- Menna Gallie – The Small Mine
- Llewelyn Wyn Griffith – The Adventures of Pryderi
- The Oxford Book of Welsh Verse
- Norman Thomas – Ask at the Unicorn
- Raymond Williams – Communications

==== Welsh language ====
- John Roberts Evans – Ar Drothwy'r Nos
- William Evans (Wil Ifan) – Colofnau Wil Ifan
- Gwyn Thomas – Chwerwder yn y Ffynhonnau

=== Music ===
- Dilys Elwyn-Edwards – Caneuon y Tri Aderyn
- Alun Hoddinott – Folksong Suite
- William Mathias – Postlude
- Grace Williams – Four Medieval Welsh Poems for alto, harp and harpsichord

== Film ==
- Richard Burton and Donald Houston appear in The Longest Day.
- Peter Greenaway makes his first film: Death of Sentiment.
- Jack Howells makes the short documentary A Tribute to Dylan Thomas featuring Richard Burton. The film wins an Academy Award for Documentary Short Subject in the following year.

== Broadcasting ==
=== Welsh-language radio ===
- 13 February – Saunders Lewis gives the Welsh Home Service’s Annual Lecture, entitled Tynged yr Iaith (The Fate of the Language).

=== Television ===
- 14 September – The first transmitter, at Preseli, of the Teledu Cymru – Wales (West and North) Television service comes on air.

=== English-language television ===
- 17 September – First edition of the Welsh national news programme BBC Wales Today.

== Sport ==
- Football – John Charles returns to Leeds United from several years playing for Italian clubs.
- Golf – Brian Huggett wins the Dutch Open championship.
- BBC Wales Sports Personality of the Year – Ivor Allchurch

== Births ==
- 5 January – Geraint Williams, footballer
- 11 January – Chris Bryant, politician
- 16 January – Bethan Gwanas, Welsh-language writer
- 25 May - Martin Goldsmith, footballer
- 27 June – Michael Ball, singer
- 28 August – David Melding, politician
- 15 September – Kevin Allen, actor, comedian and film director
- 22 July – Arthur Emyr, rugby union player and television presenter and executive
- 22 August – Iolo Williams, naturalist and TV presenter
- 5 September – Peter Wingfield, actor
- 15 October – Mark Ring, rugby union player
- 24 October – Jonathan Davies, rugby union and league player
- 11 November - Chris Sander, footballer
- 31 December – Chris Hallam, wheelchair athlete (died 2013)
- date unknown
  - Fiona Bennett, composer
  - Sioned Wiliam, broadcaster, writer and producer

== Deaths ==
- 18 January – Iolo Aneurin Williams, journalist, author and politician, 71
- 26 January – George Jeffreys, founder of the Elim Pentecostal Church, 72
- 11 February – John Edward Daniel, theologian, chairman of Plaid Cymru, 59 (road accident)
- 14 February – Ezer Griffiths, physicist, 73
- 27 February – Albert Rhys Williams, Welsh-American journalist, labour organiser, and publicist, 78
- 23 March – Clement Davies, politician, 80
- April – Edgar Morgan, rugby union player, 80
- 25 April – Herbie Baxter, Glamorgan cricketer, 79
- 30 April – Charles Williams, Anglican priest and academic, 55
- 11 May – Eliot Crawshay-Williams, politician and author, 82
- 16 June – Edgar Rees Jones, barrister and politician, 83
- 24 June – Thomas Richards, historian, 84
- 3 August - Edgar Phillips, poet and Archdruid of the National Eisteddfod, 72
- 23 August - Robert Bye, VC recipient, 72
- 23 September - Margaret Jane Gordon (Lady Gordon), singer, 82
- 5 November (in London) – Percy Cudlipp, journalist, 56
- 30 November – Lewis Pugh Evans, Victoria Cross recipient, 81
- 15 December – Charles Rhys, 8th Baron Dynevor, politician, 63
- 17 December – Lonza Bowdler, Wales international rugby union player, 61
- 21 December – Gary Hocking, motorcycle road racer, 25 (racing accident)

== See also ==
- 1962 in Northern Ireland
