= 1965 in Wales =

- Centuries: 18th; 19th; 20th; 21st
- Decades: 1940s; 1950s; 1960s; 1970s; 1980s
- See also: List of years in Wales; Timeline of Welsh history 1965 in The United Kingdom Scotland Elsewhere

This article is about the particular significance of the year 1965 to Wales and its people.

== Incumbents ==
- Secretary of State for Wales – Jim Griffiths
- Archbishop of Wales – Edwin Morris, Bishop of Monmouth
- Archdruid of the National Eisteddfod of Wales – Cynan

== Events ==
- May – Opening of Llandegfedd Reservoir by Newport Corporation.
- 17 May – Thirty-one miners are killed in a mining accident at the Cambrian Colliery, Clydach Vale, Rhondda.
- 24 May – The first drive-on car ferry service between Fishguard and Rosslare Harbour (Ireland) officially opens.
- 15 June – The Hughes-Parry Committee submits its report on the legal status of the Welsh language.
- 21 October – Official opening of Llyn Celyn reservoir.
- 17 December – A landslide on the main railway line at Bridgend kills a train driver and co-driver.
- unknown dates
  - Foundation of Undeb y Cymraeg Byw ("Union of Living Welsh").
  - Mount Stuart Primary School, Cardiff, appoints Betty Campbell, the first black female head teacher in Wales

== Arts and literature ==
=== Awards ===
- National Eisteddfod of Wales (held in Newtown, Montgomeryshire)
- National Eisteddfod of Wales: Chair – William David Williams
- National Eisteddfod of Wales: Crown – Tom Parri Jones
- National Eisteddfod of Wales: Prose Medal – Eigra Lewis Roberts

=== New books ===
==== English language ====
- Peter Bryan George – Commander-1
- Julian Mitchell – The White Father

==== Welsh language ====
- Bedwyr Lewis Jones (ed.) – Blodeugerdd o'r Bedwaredd Ganrif ar Bymtheg
- Gwilym Meredydd Jones – Dawns yr Ysgubau

=== Music ===
- 12 December – The Beatles' last live U.K. tour concludes with two performances at the Capitol, Cardiff.
- Tom Jones releases the film theme, "What's New Pussycat?" as a single.
- Rockfield Studios (near Rockfield, Monmouthshire) becomes the world's first residential recording studio.

=== Film ===
- Richard Burton stars in The Spy Who Came in from the Cold, for which he would be nominated for the Academy Award for Best Actor.
- Glynis Johns stars in Mary Poppins.
- Tryweryn, the Story of a Valley (film made by Friars School, Bangor).

=== Theatre ===
- 26 March – Harold Pinter's play The Homecoming has its world première at the New Theatre, Cardiff.

=== Broadcasting ===
- February - BBC2 is received in South Wales for the first time, as a result of a new transmitter.
- date unknown - Arwel Hughes becomes Head of Music at BBC Wales.

==== Welsh-language television ====
- Dafydd Iwan begins appearing regularly on TWW's Y Dydd.

==== English-language television ====
- As I See It, presented by Gwyn Thomas

== Sport ==
- Rugby union – Wales win the Triple Crown for the first time in 13 years.
- BBC Wales Sports Personality of the Year – Clive Rowlands

== Births ==
- 5 January – Vinnie Jones, footballer (in Watford, England)
- 22 February – Steve Speirs, born Steven Roberts, actor
- 2 March (in Bangor, County Down) – Lembit Öpik, politician
- 6 March – Allan Bateman, rugby player
- 1 April – Alexandra Shân "Tiggy" Legge-Bourke, royal nanny
- 9 April – Colin Pascoe, footballer
- April – Manon Antoniazzi, née Jenkins, Chief Executive and Clerk of the Senedd
- 3 May – Rob Brydon, comedian and actor
- 8 May – Andy Dibble, footballer
- 11 May – Jeremy Goss, footballer
- 16 May – Vincent Regan, actor
- 25 August – David Taylor, soccer player and manager
- 13 September – Andrew Williams, cricketer
- 16 October – Floyd Havard, British super-featherweight boxing champion
- 30 October – Michael Tremellen, cricketer
- 9 November – Bryn Terfel, bass-baritone singer
- date unknown – Patrick Jones, poet and author

== Deaths ==
- 7 January – Sarah Edwards, actress, 83
- 18 January – Ernest Evans, politician, 79
- 29 January – T. Harri Jones, poet and academic, 43 (suicide)
- 4 February
  - Hugh Morriston Davies, thoracic surgeon, 85
  - Llywelyn Williams, politician, 53
- 5 February – Sir David Brunt, meteorologist, 78
- 1 April – Sir John William Bowen, trade unionist and politician, 88
- 22 April – Glyn Stephens, Wales international rugby union captain, 73
- 3 May – Howard Spring, novelist, 76
- 29 May – Steve Morris, Wales international rugby player, 68
- 16 June – Dai Parker, Wales and British Lion rugby player, 60
- 17 July (in Scarborough) – Dan Lewis, footballer
- 18 August – Christmas Price Williams, politician, 83
- 24 August – Elvyn Bowen, cricketer, 58
- 30 August – Llew Edwards, boxer, 72
- 11 September – Trevor Preece, cricketer, 82
- 1 October – Gareth Hughes, actor, 71
- 9 October – Russell Taylor, Wales international rugby player, 50
- 16 October – Hywel Davies, radio broadcaster, television interviewer and writer, 46
- 22 October – William Williams, Victoria Cross recipient, 75
- 31 October – John Roberts, Wales international rugby player, 59
- 4 November – Ifor Williams, academic, 84
- 8 November – George Hall, politician, 83
- 23 November – Murray Humphreys, Chicago mobster of Welsh descent, 66
- 26 December – Llewelyn Alberic Emilius Price-Davies, Victoria Cross recipient, 87
- 29 December – Claude Warner, cricketer, 83

== See also ==
- 1965 in Northern Ireland
