= 1958 in Wales =

- Centuries: 18th; 19th; 20th; 21st
- Decades: 1930s; 1940s; 1950s; 1960s; 1970s
- See also: List of years in Wales; Timeline of Welsh history 1958 in The United Kingdom Scotland Elsewhere

This article is about the particular significance of the year 1958 to Wales and its people.

== Incumbents ==
- Minister of Welsh Affairs – Henry Brooke
- Archbishop of Wales – Edwin Morris, Bishop of Monmouth
- Archdruid of the National Eisteddfod of Wales – William Morris

== Events ==
- 18 January – Nigel Birch resigns as Economic Secretary to the Treasury.
- 5 February – The Wales national football team qualifies for this summer's World Cup in Sweden under the management of Jimmy Murphy.
- 6 February – Manchester United F.C., the English league champions where Jimmy Murphy is also assistant manager, are involved in a plane crash in Munich, West Germany, on the journey home from a European Cup tie in Yugoslavia. Seven United players are among the 21 people who die, but among the survivors is Swansea-born winger Kenny Morgans.
- 25 February – The Campaign for Nuclear Disarmament is launched by Bertrand Russell.
- 2 April – Accidental discovery of the Caernarfon Mithraeum.
- 6 May – Murderer Vivian Teed is hanged by Robert Leslie Stewart in Swansea Prison, the last hanging to take place in Wales.
- 19 June – Wales are knocked out of the World Cup in the quarter-finals, losing to Brazil.
- 26 July – At the Empire Games in Cardiff, Elizabeth II announces that her son, The Prince Charles (now Charles III), is to be created Prince of Wales.
- 6 August – Daniel Granville West becomes the first Welsh life peer.
- 18 August
  - Accidental discovery of Brymbo Man (c.2000 BCE).
  - Regional postage stamps of Great Britain are first issued.
- 24 October – Huw T. Edwards announces his resignation from the chair of the Council for Wales and Monmouthshire in protest at the decision to flood the Tryweryn valley.
- 13 December – New road bridge across the River Conway at Conway supersedes Telford's suspension bridge.
- Thomas Parry becomes Principal of University of Wales, Aberystwyth.

== Arts and literature ==
=== Awards ===
- National Eisteddfod of Wales (held in Ebbw Vale)
- National Eisteddfod of Wales: Chair – T. Llew Jones, "Caerllion ar Wysg"
- National Eisteddfod of Wales: Crown – Llywelyn Jones, "Cymod"
- National Eisteddfod of Wales: Prose Medal – Edward Cynolwyn Pugh, "Hunangofiant: Ei Ffanffer ei Hun"

=== New books ===
==== English language ====
- Tom Beynon – Howell Harris, Reformer and Soldier
- Brenda Chamberlain – The Green Heart
- Paul Ferris – A Changed Man
- Cyril Fox – Pattern and purpose: a study of early Celtic art in Britain
- Peter George – Red Alert
- Emyr Humphreys – A Toy Epic
- Bertrand Russell – Understanding History and Other Essays
- Raymond Williams – Culture and Society

==== Welsh language ====
- Aneirin Talfan Davies – Englynion a Chywyddau
- Islwyn Ffowc Elis – Blas y Cynfyd
- Bobi Jones – Nid yw Dwr yn Plygu
- D. Gwenallt Jones – Cofiant Idwal Jones
- T. Llew Jones – Trysor Plas y wernen and Merched y môr a chwedlau eraill
- Ernest Llwyd Williams – Crwydro Sir Benfro

=== New drama ===
- George Fisher – Y Ferch a'r Dewin
- John Gwilym Jones – Lle Mynno'r Gwynt
- Saunders Lewis – Brad

=== Music ===
- Daniel Jones – The Country Beyond the Stars (cantata)
- Ian Parrott – Cor Anglais concerto

== Film ==
- Richard Burton stars in the film version of Look Back in Anger.
- Ronald Lewis co-stars in The Wind Cannot Read.
- Release of The Inn of the Sixth Happiness, with location scenes (representing China) filmed around Nantmor near Beddgelert.

== Broadcasting ==
- July – In order to broadcast the British Empire and Commonwealth Games from Cardiff, a broadcasting centre is set up on the bank of the River Taff, near Cardiff Arms Park.

=== Welsh-language television ===
- Commercial TV becomes available in Wales, broadcasting some Welsh-language programmes, such as Amser Te.

=== English-language television ===
- 30 November – During the live broadcast of the Armchair Theatre play Underground on the ITV network, actor Gareth Jones has a fatal heart attack between two of his scenes.
- Gwlad y Gân / Land of Song, with Ivor Emmanuel and Sian Hopkins

== Sports ==
- British Empire and Commonwealth Games (held in Cardiff):
  - Wales' single gold medal is won by Howard Winstone in the bantamweight boxing competition.
  - Silver medals are won by: John Merriman (6 miles), Malcolm Collins (featherweight boxing), and Robert Higgins (light-heavyweight boxing).
  - Due to being on National Service in the British Army, Swansea fighter Brian Curvis competes in the games for England, winning a bronze medal at welterweight.
- Football – Wales reaches the quarter-finals of the World Cup, being knocked out by a goal from Pelé.
- Gymnastics – Margaret Neale of Cardiff is the British Women's Champion for the second year running.
- BBC Wales Sports Personality of the Year – Howard Winstone

== Births ==
- 4 January – Gary Jones, actor
- 1 March – Ian Love, footballer
- 2 March – Ian Woosnam, golfer
- 8 March – Wayne Hughes, footballer
- 16 April – Caryl Parry Jones, singer
- 30 April – Claire Curtis-Thomas, politician
- 8 May – Aneirin Hughes, actor
- 17 May – Paul Whitehouse, actor, writer and comedian
- 3 July – Siân Lloyd, television presenter
- 18 July – Chris Ruane, politician
- 19 July – Angharad Tomos, author
- 3 September (in Totnes) – Tamsin Dunwoody, politician
- 16 September – Neville Southall, footballer
- 4 October – Anneka Rice, television presenter
- 24 November – Robin Llywelyn, novelist
- date unknown – Cerith Wyn Evans, conceptual artist

== Deaths ==
- 31 January – Edgar Long, Wales international rugby player
- January/February – William Beynon, Canadian oral historian, of Welsh parentage, 69/70
- 6 February – Charles Langbridge Morgan, novelist and dramatist, 64
- 11 February – Ernest Jones, psychoanalyst, 79
- 18 February – Rhisiart Morgan Davies, physicist, 55
- 2 April – Tudor Davies, singer, 65
- 3 April – John Strand-Jones, Wales international rugby union player
- 19 April – Billy Meredith, footballer, 83
- 28 April – Joseph Booth, rugby player, 84/85
- 18 July – Ernie Jenkins, Wales international rugby player, 77
- 20 July (in London) – Margaret Haig Thomas, Viscountess Rhondda, political campaigner and businesswoman, 75
- 29 August – Harry Beadles, international footballer, 60
- 25 September – Henry Arthur Evans, politician, 60
- 9 October – Sven Hansen, ship-owner, 82
- 30 October – Tommy Vile, Welsh international rugby player, 76
- 4 November – Dick Jones, Welsh international rugby player, 78
- 30 November (in Manchester) – Gareth Jones, actor, 33
- November – Ivor Lewis, Welsh-Canadian artist, 76
- 13 December – Rose Davies, teacher, feminist, and labour activist, 66
- date unknown – Evan Edwards, footballer, 59/60

== See also ==
- 1958 in Northern Ireland
