= 1959 in Wales =

- Centuries: 18th; 19th; 20th; 21st
- Decades: 1930s; 1940s; 1950s; 1960s; 1970s
- See also: List of years in Wales; Timeline of Welsh history 1959 in The United Kingdom Scotland Elsewhere

This article is about the particular significance of the year 1959 to Wales and its people.

== Incumbents ==
- Minister of Welsh Affairs – Henry Brooke
- Archbishop of Wales – Edwin Morris, Bishop of Monmouth
- Archdruid of the National Eisteddfod of Wales – William Morris

== Events ==
Flag of Wales approved in 1959

- 1 January – The 1st The Queen's Dragoon Guards (informally known as the "Welsh Cavalry") is formed.
- February – The Queen makes the red dragon on a green and white background the official flag of Wales.
- 4 May – Aneurin Bevan is elected deputy leader of the Labour Party.
- 6 August – Huw T. Edwards leaves the Labour Party for Plaid Cymru in protest at the decision to flood the Tryweryn valley.
- 8 October – At the UK general election:
  - Newly elected MPs include John Morris (Aberavon); Donald Box (Cardiff North); Ifor Davies (Gower) and Geraint Morgan (Denbigh).
  - Poet Waldo Williams stands as a Plaid Cymru candidate.
  - Hugh Dalton retires from Parliament.
- The Local Government Commission for Wales is set up, chaired by Sir Guildhaume Myrddin-Evans.
- Sir William Jones resigns from the Council for Wales and Monmouthshire in protest at the appointment of Henry Brooke.
- Will Paynter becomes Secretary of the National Union of Mineworkers (Great Britain).
- Gomer Berry, 1st Viscount Kemsley, sells his holdings in Kemsley Newspapers to Roy Thomson.
- Gilbern Sports Cars begin production of their kit cars at Llantwit Fardre, Pontypridd, Glamorgan.

== Arts and literature ==
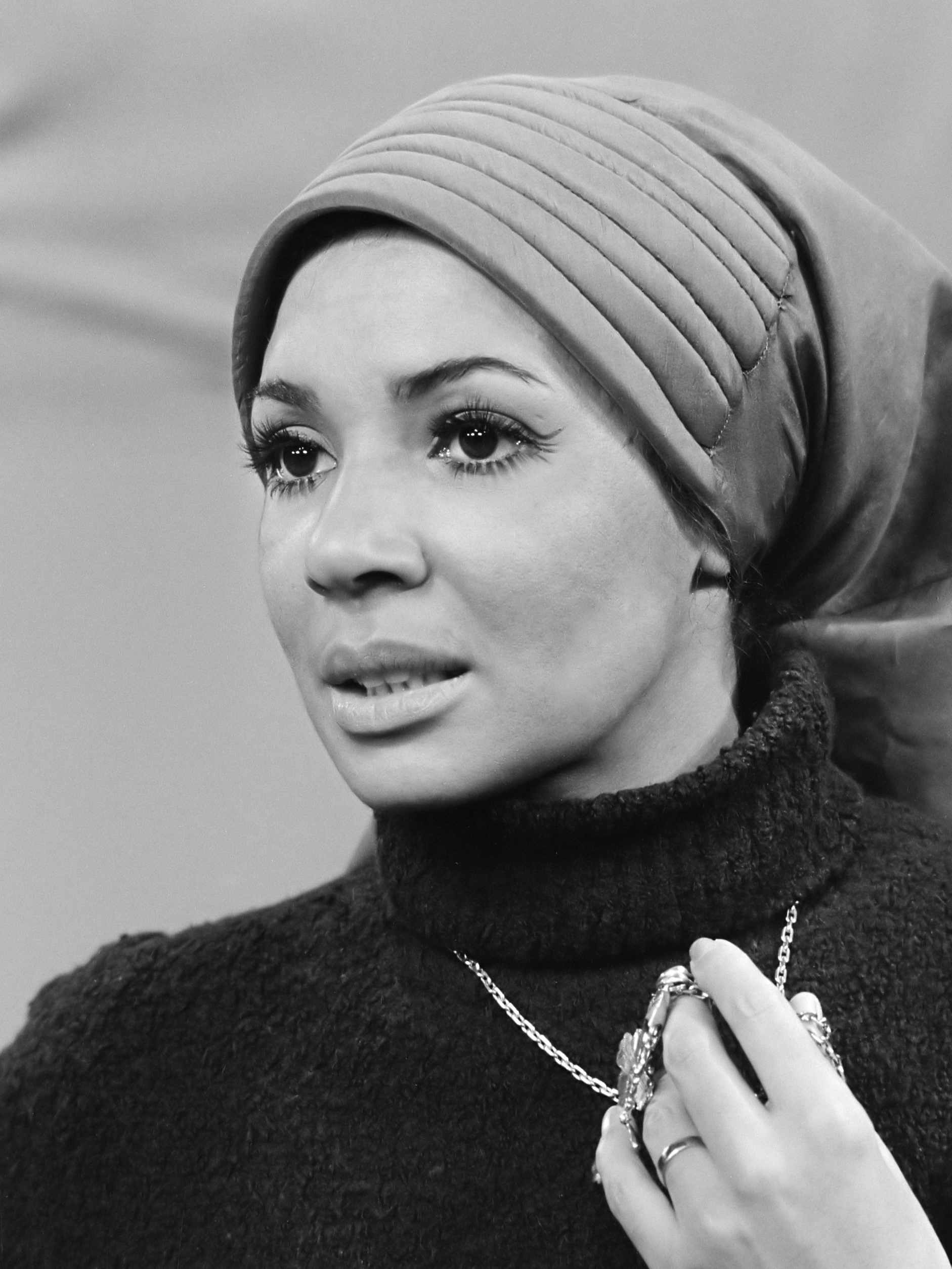
Shirley Bassey

- 8 January – Sir Lewis Casson and Dame Sybil Thorndike celebrate their 50th wedding anniversary (last December) by appearing together in Eighty in the Shade, a play written especially for them, in London.
- 9 January – Shirley Bassey is the first Welsh singer to hit number one in the UK singles chart, with "As I Love You".
- December – Actress Siân Phillips marries Peter O'Toole in Dublin.
- Literature Wales is established as The Academi.
- Harry Secombe is voted Show Business Personality of the Year.

=== Awards ===
- National Eisteddfod of Wales (held in Caernarfon)
- National Eisteddfod of Wales: Chair – T. Llew Jones
- National Eisteddfod of Wales: Crown – Tom Huws
- National Eisteddfod of Wales: Prose Medal – William Owen

=== New books ===
==== English language ====
- Menna Gallie – Strike for a Kingdom
- Edgar Phillips – Edmund Jones, "The Old Prophet"
- Bertrand Russell – My Philosophical Development

==== Welsh language ====
- Albert Evans-Jones – Cerddi Cynan, y casgliad cyflawn
- D. Gwenallt Jones – Gwreiddiau
- Kate Roberts – Te yn y Grug

=== Music ===
- Grace Williams – All Seasons shall be Sweet

== Film ==
- Rachel Thomas, Meredith Edwards and Megs Jenkins appear with John Mills and Hayley Mills in Tiger Bay.
- Hugh Griffith wins the Academy Award for Best Supporting Actor for his role in Ben-Hur.

== Broadcasting ==
- Statistics show that 50% of households in Wales have television licences.
- The BBC Third Programme becomes available on VHF from Wenvoe.

=== Welsh-language television ===
- Ar Lin Mam (children's programme)
- Trysor o Gân (Treasury of Song)

=== English-language television ===
- Ivor the Engine (children's programme)

== Sports ==
- Athletics – The Welsh Games are held for the first time.
- Boxing – Former world flyweight champion Jimmy Wilde is elected to the American Boxing Hall of Fame.
- BBC Wales Sports Personality of the Year – Graham Moore

== Births ==
- 30 January – Cynthia Carter, journalist, author and academic
- 25 February – Mike Peters, rock singer (died 2025)
- 21 March – Colin Jones, boxer
- 24 April – Paula Yates, television presenter (died 2000)
- 3 May – Eddie Niedzwiecki, footballer
- 8 May – Jillian Evans MEP, politician
- 20 May – Annabel Giles, model
- 28 May – Steve Strange, born Steven Harrington, pop singer/promoter (died 2015)
- 18 June – Jocelyn Davies AM, politician
- 5 September – Mike Ruddock, rugby coach
- 7 November – Richard Barrett, composer
- 26 November – Dai Davies MP, politician
- date unknown – Paul Henry, poet

== Deaths ==
William Nantlais Williams, died 18 June

- 1 January – Daniel Jones, Wales international rugby player, 83
- 13 January – Henry Weale, Victoria Cross recipient, 61
- 3 February – Sir Evan Williams, 1st Baronet, industrialist, 87
- 21 February – Kathleen Freeman, classical scholar, 61
- 24 February – Sid Judd, international rugby player, 30
- 3 March – Billy Bancroft, rugby and cricket player, 88
- 21 April – David Bell, writer and curator, 43
- 26 May – Thomas Baker Jones, Wales international rugby player, 96
- 18 June – Nantlais Williams, poet and preacher, 84
- 2 July – Ivor Davies, rugby player, 67
- 7 July – Frank Williams, Wales international rugby player, 49
- 23 July – George Davies, international rugby player, 83
- 5 August – D. W. Davis, Governor of Idaho, 86
- 9 August – John Hart Evans, rugby player, 78
- 15 October – Thomas Wynford Rees, army officer, 61
- 23 October – Anthony Windham Jones, rugby player, 80
- 16 November – Fanny Winifred Edwards, teacher and writer, 83
- 17 November – David Owen Morgan, zoologist, 66
- 27 November – Grenville Morris, footballer, 81
- 10 December – W. R. Davies, US academic of Welsh descent, 66 (heart attack)
- 28 December – David Brazell, singer, 84
- 30 December – Dick Duckfield, cricketer, 52

== See also ==
- 1959 in Northern Ireland
