= 1956 in Wales =

- Centuries: 18th; 19th; 20th; 21st
- Decades: 1930s; 1940s; 1950s; 1960s; 1970s
- See also: List of years in Wales; Timeline of Welsh history 1956 in The United Kingdom Scotland Elsewhere

This article is about the particular significance of the year 1956 to Wales and its people.

== Incumbents ==
- Archbishop of Wales – John Morgan, Bishop of Llandaff
- Archdruid of the National Eisteddfod of Wales – Dyfnallt

== Events ==
- April – One of the last Welsh-built naval vessels afloat, former iron screw frigate HMS Inconstant (1868), built at Pembroke Dock, arrives in Belgium to be broken up.
- 2 April – Huw Wheldon marries Jacqueline Clarke.
- 24 April – A 250,000 signature petition is presented to the Westminster parliament by the all-party Parliament for Wales Campaign.
- 9 May – The Gower Peninsula becomes the first area in the British Isles to be designated an Area of Outstanding Natural Beauty.
- 9 July – Mettoy introduce Corgi Toys model cars, manufactured at Fforestfach in South Wales.
- September – Bangor Normal College and Trinity College, Carmarthen, introduce courses in Welsh-medium teaching.
- 4 September – Opening of the first Welsh-medium secondary school in Wales – Ysgol Glan Clwyd, Rhyl.
- 22 November – In a mining accident at Lewis Merthyr Colliery, seven men are killed.
- exact date unknown – Aberystwyth's town clock is demolished as unsafe.

== Arts and literature ==
- Welsh language periodical Y Faner is bought by Huw T. Edwards and thus saved from going out of business.
- Morecambe and Wise are reunited by chance at the Swansea Empire Theatre.
- 22 November – The New Scientist is launched by Percy Cudlipp, who becomes its first editor.

=== Awards ===
- National Eisteddfod of Wales (held in Aberdare)
- National Eisteddfod of Wales: Chair – Mathonwy Hughes, "Gwraig"
- National Eisteddfod of Wales: Crown – withheld
- National Eisteddfod of Wales: Prose Medal – W. T. Gruffydd, "Y Pwrpas Mawr"

=== New books ===
==== English language ====
- Margiad Evans – A Candle Ahead
- Bertrand Russell – Portraits from Memory and Other Essays

==== Welsh language ====
- Huw T. Edwards – Tros y Tresi
- Islwyn Ffowc Elis – Yn Ôl i Leifior
- David Rees Griffiths – Caneuon Amanwy
- Kate Roberts – Y Byw sy'n Cysgu
- Waldo Williams – Dail Pren

=== Music ===
- February – Release of Shirley Bassey's first single, Burn My Candle (At Both Ends)
- William Mathias – Suite for Trumpet and Piano, Op.4
- Grace Williams – Symphony No. 2

=== Film ===
- Richard Burton stars in Alexander the Great; William Squire also appears.
- Glynis Johns stars in The Court Jester.
- Edmund Gwenn makes his last film appearance.
- Moby Dick partly filmed at Lower Fishguard.

=== Broadcasting ===
- The BBC Light Programme becomes available on VHF from Wenvoe.

==== Welsh-language television ====
- Granada Television begins producing up to an hour a week of current affairs and education programmes in Welsh to serve the overlap audience in north Wales.

==== English-language television ====
- June – First televised English-language play produced in Wales, Wind of Heaven.

== Sport ==
- Boxing
  - 27 August – Joe Erskine defeats Johnny Williams in Cardiff to win the vacant British heavyweight title.
- Rugby Union
  - Wales under the captaincy of Cliff Morgan, win the Five Nations Championship for the fifth time this decade.
  - 24 March – Wales beat France 5–3 in a game held at the National Stadium, Cardiff
- BBC Wales Sports Personality of the Year – Joe Erskine

== Births ==
- 7 January – Johnny Owen, boxer (died 1980)
- 7 April – Christine Chapman AM, politician
- May – Iwan Bala, artist
- 14 June – Keith Pontin, international footballer (died 2020)
- 22 July – Richard Gwyn writer
- 7 September – Byron Stevenson, footballer (died 2007)
- 3 November – Carl Harris, international footballer
- 4 December – Nia Griffith MP, politician, born in Ireland
- 19 December – John Griffiths, politician
- 23 December – Robert Gwilym, actor
- date unknown – David Nott, surgeon

== Deaths ==
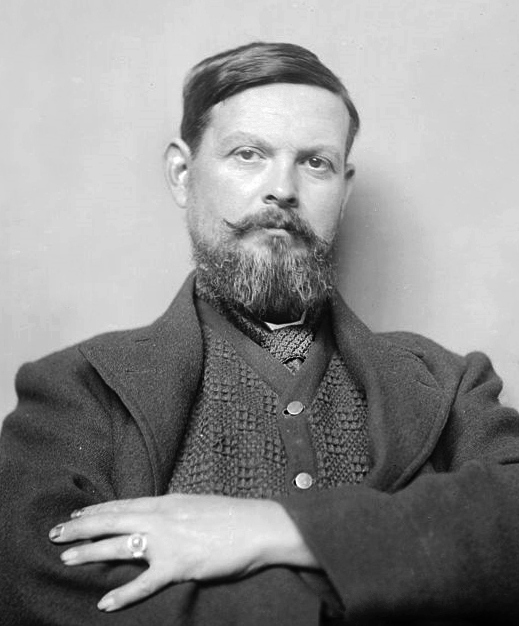
Frank Brangwyn, died 11 June

Winifred Coombe Tennant, died 31 August

- 4 January – Robert Williams Parry, poet, 71
- 10 January – Jack Johns, cricketer, 70
- 14 January – Sam Ramsey, Wales international rugby union player
- 23 January – William Harris, academic and translator, 71
- 1 February – John Lloyd-Jones, academic, 70
- 22 February – Nathaniel Walters, Wales international rugby player, 80
- 27 February – Tudor Rees, lawyer, judge and Liberal politician, 75
- 19 May – Peter Freeman, politician, 67
- 8 June – Walter Rice, 7th Baron Dynevor, soldier, civil servant and politician, 82
- 5 July – Fred Birt, Welsh international rugby union player, 69
- 11 June – Frank Brangwyn, artist, 89
- 17 August – William Havard, Bishop of St. Davids and international rugby player, 66
- 31 August – Winifred Coombe Tennant, politician and philanthropist, 81
- 13 September – David Davies, footballer, 77
- 20 September – Arthur Tysilio Johnson, farmer and author, 83
- 1 October – J. O. Francis, dramatist, 74
- 11 October
  - David James Davies, economist and politician, 63
  - Harry Parry, jazz musician, 44
- 16 October – Robert Evans (Cybi), historian, 84
- 22 November – Rhys Hopkin Morris MP, politician, 68
- 16 December – Nina Hamnett, artist, 66
- 28 December – John Dyfnallt Owen, poet and archdruid, 83

== See also ==
- 1956 in Northern Ireland
