= 1962 in Scotland =

- Centuries: 18th; 19th; 20th; 21st
- Decades: 1940s; 1950s; 1960s; 1970s; 1980s
- See also: List of years in Scotland; Timeline of Scottish history 1962 in: The UK • Wales • Elsewhere; Scottish football: 1961–62 • 1962–63; 1962 in Scottish television

Events from the year 1962 in Scotland.

== Incumbents ==
- Secretary of State for Scotland and Keeper of the Great Seal – John Maclay until 13 July; then Michael Noble

=== Law officers ===
- Lord Advocate – William Grant; then Ian Shearer, Lord Avonside
- Solicitor General for Scotland – David Colville Anderson

=== Judiciary ===
- Lord President of the Court of Session and Lord Justice General – Lord Clyde
- Lord Justice Clerk – Lord Thomson, then Lord Grant
- Chairman of the Scottish Land Court – Lord Gibson

== Events ==
- 1 February – Loganair, the Scottish airline, is established.
- 12 March – the Church of the Good Shepherd in Ayr (1957) is elevated to the Good Shepherd Cathedral for the Roman Catholic Diocese of Galloway.
- 16 April – Livingston is officially designated as a New Town.
- 19 April – the North British Locomotive Company of Springburn goes into liquidation.
- 14 June – West Lothian by-election: Tam Dalyell retains the seat for Labour with the Scottish National Party coming second.
- 16 August – the series Dr. Finlay's Casebook is first broadcast on BBC Television across the U.K.
- 25 September – the last steam locomotive built in Scotland, by Andrew Barclay Sons & Co. of Kilmarnock, is despatched to its customer in Sumatra.
- 22 November – Glasgow Woodside by-election: Labour gain the seat from the Conservatives.
- 6 December – last permanent residents leave the Island of Stroma.
- Late – origins of Findhorn Foundation.
- The first nude mouse strain is discovered by N. R. Grist at Ruchill Hospital's Brownlee virology laboratory in Glasgow.

== Births ==
- January – William Duff, dentist, jailed for fraud and reckless endangerment
- 3 January – Gavin Hastings, rugby union player
- 4 January – Robin Guthrie, guitarist and producer (Cocteau Twins)
- 5 January – Murray Pittock, cultural historian
- 10 January – Ford Kiernan, actor and comedian
- 11 January – Steve Hislop, motorcycle racer (killed in helicopter accident 2003)
- February – John Gordon Sinclair (born Gordon John Sinclair), actor
- 26 February – Pen Hadow (born Rupert Nigel Pendrill Hadow), arctic explorer
- 5 March – The Proclaimers (Charlie and Craig Reid), twin folk rock musicians
- 9 March – Pete Wishart, SNP MP and member of Celtic rock group Runrig
- 17 March
  - Clare Grogan, singer and actress
  - Andy Kerr, Labour MSP (1999–2011) and government minister
- 10 April – Nicky Campbell, radio and television presenter and journalist
- 22 April – Ann McKechin, Labour MP
- 23 April – John Hannah, film and television actor
- 13 May – Kathleen Jamie, poet
- 17 May
  - Craig Ferguson, American television host, stand-up comedian, writer, actor, director, author, producer and voice artist
  - Alan Johnston, journalist
- 19 May – Iain Harvie, alternative rock guitarist
- 24 May – Derek Browning, Moderator of the General Assembly of the Church of Scotland
- 27 May – David Mundell, Secretary of State for Scotland, Conservative MP and solicitor
- 13 June – Paul Motwani, Grandmaster (chess)
- 22 June – Bobby Gillespie, rock singer-songwriter (Primal Scream)
- 30 June – Colin Campbell, 7th Earl Cawdor, peer and architect
- 31 July – Jackie Bird, journalist and newsreader
- 24 August – Ali Smith, novelist
- 23 September – Deborah Orr, journalist (died 2019)
- 24 September – Ally McCoist, international footballer, manager, television pundit and A Question of Sport team captain
- 6 November – Stuart Dougal, football referee
- 25 November – Blythe Duff, actress
- 28 December – Kaye Adams, television presenter
- Jack Docherty, writer, actor, presenter and producer

== Deaths ==
- 19 April – Sir Harold Yarrow, 2nd Baronet, industrialist (born 1884 in England)
- 15 August – Bob McIntyre, motorcycle racer (born 1928)

== The arts ==
- 5 June – Scottish Opera, Scotland's national opera company, is founded by Alexander Gibson.
- August–September – Dmitri Shostakovich and Benjamin Britten are present at the Edinburgh Festival for performances of their works.
- 5 October – global release of the film Dr. No with Edinburgh-born Sean Connery originating the film character of James Bond.
- Folk group The Corries is formed in Edinburgh.

== See also ==
- 1962 in Northern Ireland
- 1962 in Wales
