= 1960 in Scottish television =

List of prominent events in Scottish television in 1960

This is a list of events in Scottish television from 1960.

== Events ==
  - 29 May - ITV broadcasts a Scotland international live for the first time. Scottish Television shows their 4-1 defeat in Austria.
- August – The ITV franchise for North East Scotland is awarded to North of Scotland Television Limited, from seven applications.
- Unknown – The ITV franchise for the Anglo-Scottish border region is awarded to Border Television, from two applications. The other bid came from Solway Television.

== Television series ==
- Scotsport (1957–2008)
- The White Heather Club (1958–1968)

== Births ==
- 18 June – Paul Coia, television presenter and continuity announcer
- 13 September – Andy Gray, actor (died 2021)
- 6 October – Richard Jobson, television presenter and singer-songwriter
- Unknown – Richard Gordon, radio and television broadcaster

== See also ==
- 1960 in Scotland
