= 1958 in Scottish television =

This is a list of events in Scottish television from 1958.

== Events ==
- 7 May - First broadcast of the BBC variety show The White Heather Club, which aired until 1968.
- August - Scottish Television gains rights to televise filmed highlights of Scottish League matches. Scotsport, which was previously shown only on Wednesdays, becomes part of the Saturday night schedule.
- 9 September - Scottish Television broadcasts live football for the first time.

== Debuts ==
=== BBC ===
- 7 May - The White Heather Club (1958–1968)

== Television programmes ==
- Scotsport (1957–2008)

== Births ==
- 2 August - Elaine C. Smith, actress and comedian
- 30 November - Gary Lewis, actor
- Unknown - Alastair Duncan, actor
- Unknown - Rob MacLean, television presenter

== See also ==
- 1958 in Scotland
