= 1964 in Wales =

- Centuries: 18th; 19th; 20th; 21st
- Decades: 1940s; 1950s; 1960s; 1970s; 1980s
- See also: List of years in Wales; Timeline of Welsh history 1964 in The United Kingdom Scotland Elsewhere

This article is about the particular significance of the year 1964 to Wales and its people.

== Incumbents ==
- Secretary of State for Wales – Jim Griffiths (from 17 October)
- Archbishop of Wales – Edwin Morris, Bishop of Monmouth
- Archdruid of the National Eisteddfod of Wales – Cynan

== Events ==
- 9 February – The BBC launches a dedicated television service for Wales.
- March – A representative of the National Coal Board writes to Mr DCW Jones, the Merthyr Tydfil Borough and Waterworks engineer, stating that they "would not like to continue beyond the next 6/8 weeks in tipping" coal slurry on Tip No 7 at Aberfan "where it is likely to be a source of danger to Pantglas school". Two and a half years later the tip would destroy the school, killing 116 children.
- 15 March – Richard Burton marries Elizabeth Taylor (for the first time) in Montreal.
- April – George Street Bridge, Newport opens, the first cable-stayed bridge in the UK.
- 15 October – In the United Kingdom general election, Wales elects 28 Labour MPs, six Conservatives and two Liberals.
  - Alan Williams becomes MP for Swansea West
  - Ioan Evans becomes MP for Birmingham Yardley.
  - Leslie Thomas, son of Labour stalwart, Jimmy Thomas, becomes Conservative MP for Canterbury.
- 17 October – The Welsh Office is established, under the leadership of a Secretary of State for Wales (Jim Griffiths).
- 27 October – Pembroke Refinery is officially opened by Queen Elizabeth II of the United Kingdom.
- 11 November – Politician Alun Gwynne Jones is raised to the peerage with the title Baron Chalfont of Llantarnam.
- date unknown
  - Civic Trust for Wales formed to promote conservation and enhancement of the built environment.
  - Opening of the Edgar Evans building at the Royal Navy shore establishment on Whale Island, Portsmouth.

== Arts and literature ==
=== Awards ===
- Queen's Gold Medal for Poetry – R. S. Thomas
- National Eisteddfod of Wales (held in Swansea)
- National Eisteddfod of Wales: Chair – Bryn Williams
- National Eisteddfod of Wales: Crown – Rhydwen Williams
- National Eisteddfod of Wales: Prose Medal – Rhiannon Davies Jones

=== New books ===
==== English language ====
- Aneirin Talfan Davies – Dylan: Druid of the Broken Body
- Emrys Daniel Hughes – Sir Alec Douglas-Home
- Stead Jones – Make Room for the Jester
- Howard Spring – Winds of the Day
- Reginald Frances Treharne – The Battle of Lewes in English History
- Raymond Williams – Modern Tragedy

==== Welsh language ====
- John Gwilym Jones – Hanes Rhyw Gymro
- John Robert Jones – Yr Argyfwng Gwacter Ystyr
- Saunders Lewis – Merch Gwern Hywel
- Caradog Prichard – Genod yn ein Bywyd
- Thomas Ifor Rees – Illimani

=== Music ===
- Geraint Evans stars as Falstaff at the Metropolitan Opera.

== Film ==
- Richard Burton stars in The Night of the Iguana.
- Siân Phillips takes her first major film role in Becket, alongside her husband Peter O'Toole and Burton.
- Victor Spinetti appears with The Beatles in A Hard Day's Night. Alun Owen's screenplay is nominated for an Academy Award.

== Broadcasting ==
- BBC Wales is launched.

=== Welsh-language television ===
- Sion a Sian (later also produced in English as Mr and Mrs)

=== English-language television ===
- Wales Today

== Sport ==
- Olympic Games – Lynn Davies wins the gold medal in the men's long jump.
- Rugby union
  - 1 February – Wales defeat Scotland 11–3 in Cardiff. Stuart Watkins makes his international debut.
  - 7 March – Wales defeat Ireland 15–6 in Dublin. John Dawes makes his international debut.
  - Wales win the Five Nations Championship.
  - The Welsh national side makes its first overseas tour, to South Africa.
- Tennis – Gerald Battrick wins the British and French junior championships.
- BBC Wales Sports Personality of the Year – Lynn Davies

== Births ==
- 29 January – Anna Ryder Richardson, interior designer, television presenter and zookeeper
- 9 February – Dewi Morris, rugby player
- 4 March – Dave Colclough, poker player (died 2016
- 21 March – Ieuan Evans, rugby player
- 22 June – Neil Haddock, Welsh and British Champion super featherweight boxer
- 23 June – Robert Dickie, Welsh and British Champion boxing champion (died 2010)
- 16 August – Nigel Redman, rugby player
- 15 September – Steve Watkin, cricketer
- 8 October – Alan Knill, footballer
- 3 November – Wayne Mumford, footballer
- 28 November – Sian Williams, television presenter
- 30 November – Richard Brake, actor
- 1 December – Jo Walton, novelist and poet
- 31 December – Lowri Turner, television presenter
- date unknown
  - Rhidian Brook, novelist, screenwriter and broadcaster
  - Grahame Davies, poet

== Deaths ==
- 4 January – Arthur Wade-Evans, historian, 88
- 7 January – Cyril Davies, harmonica player, 31
- 13 February – Cliff Richards, rugby player, 62
- 14 February
  - Sir Guildhaume Myrddin-Evans, civil servant, 69
  - William Ormsby-Gore, 4th Baron Harlech, 78
- 3 March – Ieuan Williams, cricketer, 54
- 6 August – Norman Matthews, clergyman and broadcaster, 60
- 14 August – Redvers Sangoe, Light-heavyweight boxer, 28
- 26 August – Bryn Roberts, trade union leader, 67
- 14 September – Fitzroy Richard Somerset, 4th Baron Raglan, anthropologist, 79
- 18 September – Juliet Rhys-Williams, writer and politician, 65
- 9 October – Thomas Jones Pierce, historian, 59
- 5 November – Owen Jones politician in Canada, 74
- 13 November – Leslie Morris, Welsh-Canadian politician, 60
- 14 November – Idwal Jones, novelist, 73
- 30 November – Sir John Cecil-Williams, lawyer and secretary of the Cymmrodorion, 72
- 4 December (in Melbourne) – James 'Tuan' Jones, Wales and British Lion rugby player, 81
- date unknown – Idloes Owen, singer, composer, and conductor, 59

== See also ==
- 1964 in Northern Ireland
