= 1957 in Wales =

- Centuries: 18th; 19th; 20th; 21st
- Decades: 1930s; 1940s; 1950s; 1960s; 1970s
- See also: List of years in Wales; Timeline of Welsh history 1957 in The United Kingdom Scotland Elsewhere

This article is about the particular significance of the year 1957 to Wales and its people.

== Incumbents ==
- Minister of Welsh Affairs – Henry Brooke
- Archbishop of Wales
  - John Morgan, Bishop of Llandaff (died 26 June)
  - Edwin Morris, Bishop of Monmouth (elected)
- Archdruid of the National Eisteddfod of Wales
  - Dyfnallt (outgoing)
  - William Morris (incoming)

== Events ==
- 18 January – Nigel Birch is appointed Economic Secretary to the Treasury.
- 25 February – Goronwy Rees, Principal of the University of Wales College Aberystwyth, resigns following allegations that he has spied for the Soviet Union.
- 28 February – Carmarthen by-election is held following the death of Sir Rhys Hopkin Morris the previous year. The Liberal Party lose the seat to Labour's Lady Megan Lloyd George, herself a former Liberal MP.
- 1 July – Royal physician Horace Evans is created 1st Baron Evans of Merthyr Tydfil.
- 6 July – The Royal Welsh Show is held at Blaendolau; the showground is flooded to a depth of 1 metre.
- 16 July – Five people drown in a boating accident at Barmouth.
- 31 July – The Tryweryn Bill, permitting Liverpool City Council to build a reservoir which will drown the village of Capel Celyn, becomes law.
- 8 September – The town hall at Aberystwyth is seriously damaged by fire.
- 21 November – Morgan Phillips and Aneurin Bevan, along with Richard Crossman, successfully sue The Spectator for libel.
- 12 December – Wales gets its own minister of state in the Westminster government for the first time. Prime Minister Harold Macmillan rejects requests for a Secretary of State.
- date unknown – Brecon Beacons becomes the third of Wales's national parks.

== Arts and literature ==
- 5 October – Paul Robeson (blacklisted at this time from travelling outside the United States) addresses the Miners' Eisteddfod at the Grand Pavilion, Porthcawl via a transatlantic telephone link to the miners' leader Will Paynter.

=== Awards ===
- National Eisteddfod of Wales (held in Llangefni)
- National Eisteddfod of Wales: Chair – Gwilym Tilsley, "Cwm Carnedd"
- National Eisteddfod of Wales: Crown – Dyfnallt Morgan, "Drama Fydryddol Rhwng Dau"
- National Eisteddfod of Wales: Prose Medal – Tom Parri Jones, Teisennau Berffro

=== New books ===
==== Welsh language ====
- Käte Bosse-Griffiths – Mae'r Galon wrth y Llyw
- Islwyn Ffowc Elis – Wythnos Yng Nghymru Fydd
- Bobi Jones – Y Gân Gyntaf
- W. Leslie Richards – Telyn Teilo
- Gwilym Tilsley – Y glöwr a cherddi eraill

==== English language ====
- John Charles – King of Soccer
- Rhys Davies – The Perishable Quality
- Trevor Ford – I Lead the Attack
- Dick Francis – The Sport of Queens
- T. Harri Jones – The Enemy in the Heart

=== New drama ===
- Albert Evans-Jones – Absalom Fy Mab

=== Music ===
- Shirley Bassey – Banana Boat Song (her first chart single)
- Alun Hoddinott – Harp Concerto (written for Osian Ellis)
- Daniel Jones – String Quartet 1957

=== Film ===
- Donald Houston stars in The Girl in the Picture.

=== Broadcasting ===
- Alun Oldfield-Davies becomes senior regional BBC controller, after several years of successful campaigning for Welsh-language television.

==== Welsh-language television ====
- February – Cefndir (first regular Welsh-language programme)
- September – Dewch i Mewn (magazine programme)

==== English-language television ====
- Adaptation of Dylan Thomas's Under Milk Wood, starring Donald Houston and William Squire.

== Sport ==
- Football
  - Swansea-born John Charles transfers from Leeds United to Juventus of Turin for a transfer fee of £65,000 (almost double the previous British record)
  - Pelé scores a hattrick against Wales
- BBC Wales Sports Personality of the Year – Dai Rees
- Inaugural Glamorgan County Silver Ball Trophy competition held; Taibach RFC are champions.

== Births ==
- 10 March – Terry Holmes, rugby player
- 19 March (in Birmingham) – Jane Davidson AM, politician
- 20 April – Geraint Wyn Davies, actor
- 26 April – Edwina Hart AM, politician
- 8 May – Eddie Butler, rugby union player and commentator (died 2022)
- 17 May – Anne Main, educator and politician
- 12 June – Javed Miandad, Glamorgan cricketer
- 1 July – Wayne David MP, politician
- 20 July – Chris Bromham, stuntman
- 11 August – Leighton Andrews AM, politician
- 11 September – Julie Williams, neuropsychological geneticist and Chief Scientific Adviser for Wales
- 11 October
  - (in Holyhead) Dawn French, actress and comedian
  - Jon Langford, musician
- 19 October – Karl Wallinger, folk rock songwriter and multi-instrumentalist (died 2024)
- 10 November – Nigel Evans MP, politician
- 21 December – Roger Blake, actor
- Charlotte Voake, children's illustrator

== Deaths ==
- 6 March – Gwladys Evan Morris, actress and writer, 77
- 21 March – Russell Thomas, doctor, lawyer and politician, 60
- 30 July – William Richard Arnold, rugby player, 76
- 26 June – John Morgan, Archbishop of Wales and Bishop of Llandaff, 71
- 1 August – Llewellyn Lloyd, Wales international rugby union player, 80
- 15 August – Alice Williams, writer, painter and voluntary worker, 94
- 20 August – Edward Evans, 1st Baron Mountevans, explorer and admiral, 75
- 12 September – Tom Pearson, Wales national rugby player, 85
- 26 September – Arthur Powell Davies, Unitarian minister and writer, 55
- 10 October – Lloyd Davies, footballer, 80
- 12 November – Wilfred Hodder, Wales international rugby player, 61
- 7 December
  - Maurice Jones, priest and academic, 94
  - Alfred Ernest Watkins, footballer, 79
- 9 December – Llewellyn Gwynne, first bishop of Egypt and Sudan, 94

== See also ==
- 1957 in Northern Ireland
