= 1960 in England =

- Centuries: 18th; 19th; 20th; 21st
- Decades: 1940s; 1950s; 1960s; 1970s; 1980s
- See also: 1959–60 in English football 1960–61 in English football 1960 in the United Kingdom; Other events of 1960

Events from 1960 in England

== Incumbents ==
- Monarch - Elizabeth II
- Prime Minister - Harold Macmillan

== Births ==
- February 19 – Prince Andrew, Duke of York, Son of Elizabeth II
- March 16 – John Hemming, British Liberal Democrat politician and businessman
- September 9 – Hugh Grant, English actor
- September 10 – Colin firth, English actor
- November 18 – Kim Wilde, English singer and gardener

== See also ==
- 1960 in Northern Ireland
- 1960 in Scotland
- 1960 in Wales
