= Michael Tremellen =

Welsh cricketer

Personal information
- Full name: Jonathon Michael Tremellen
- Born: 30 October 1965 (age 61); Pendine, Carmarthenshire, Wales
- Batting: Right-handed
- Bowling: Right-arm medium

Domestic team information
- Years: Team
- 1988: Wales Minor Counties
- 1986–1988: Cambridge University

Career statistics
Competition	First-class
Matches	12
Runs scored	269
Batting average	15.82
100s/50s	–/–
Top score	39
Balls bowled	282
Wickets	2
Bowling average	112.00
5 wickets in innings	–
10 wickets in match	–
Best bowling	1/13
Catches/stumpings	4/–
- Source: Cricinfo, 6 September 2011

Jonathon Michael Tremellen (born 30 October 1965) is a former Welsh cricketer. Tremellen was a right-handed batsman who bowled right-arm medium pace. He was born in Pendine, Carmarthenshire.

While studying at Cambridge University, Tremellen made his first-class debut for Cambridge University Cricket Club against Hampshire in 1986. He made eleven further first-class appearances for the university, the last of which came against Surrey in 1988. In his twelve first-class matches, he scored 269 runs at an average of 15.82, with a high score of 39. With the ball, he took 2 wickets at an expensive bowling average of 112.00, with best figures of 1/13.

In 1988, he made his debut for Wales Minor Counties, making his debut for the county in the Minor Counties Championship against Cornwall. He made four further appearances for the team in that season.
