= George Fisher (dramatist) =

Francis George Fisher ("FGF") (1909–1970) was a Welsh language dramatist and theatrical producer, born in Bargoed, Glamorgan.

As a dramatist, he is best known for Y Lleoedd Pell, Y Blaidd-Ddyn and Awena, as well as for the verse drama Y Ferch a'r Dewin (1958).

== Biography ==
Born in Bargoed, Glamorgan, Francis George Fisher was educated at Lewis' School, Pengam, and at University College, Cardiff, where he captained the University swimming team before graduating in Mathematics in 1930. For a short period he was a teacher in a missionary college on the Gold Coast in West Africa; then in 1932 a mathematics teacher at Llangefni Grammar School, latterly Llangefni County Comprehensive, becoming deputy headmaster until his sudden death.

George Fisher (he preferred his middle name) began writing in English, publishing his first novel, One Has Been Honest, at the age of 21 before his graduation. He wrote many poems and stories, published in The Adelphi and The Twentieth Century during the 1930s, before turning to drama. His play The Disinherited was performed in Swansea's Little Theatre in July 1939.

Fisher served in the Navy during World War II as a Lieutenant and, while he was in Iceland, he learned Welsh from Caradar's booklet Welsh Made Easy. From that time, he was intent on writing plays in Welsh, mastering 'cynghanedd'. He wrote at least five short plays between 1945 and 1952 and three long plays: Catrin (first prize in the National Eisteddfod at Dolgellau, 1949), Y Ferch a'r Dewin ("The girl and the wizard") (which shared first prize in the National Eisteddfod at Rhyl, 1953) and Merch yw Medusa ("Medusa is a girl"), 1951.

He also translated Andre Obey's play, Noa (1951). He produced thirty plays, twenty of these in Welsh, including all his own works and the memorably great productions of the plays of Saunders Lewis. He became a member of the Welsh Arts Council Drama Committee and was awarded the MBE for services to Welsh Theatre in 1958.

His most important contribution was to ensure that Cymdeithas Ddrama Llangefni (Llangefni dramatic society) had a permanent home, with the opening of Theatr Fach in Pencraig, Llangefni, on 3 May 1955. He was made director of the theatre and realised his vision of an amateur theatre, regularly presenting plays of truly professional standard in Welsh and English. Theatr Fach celebrated its 50th anniversary in May 2005 and this is his monument.

Fisher died at his house in Llangefni in 1970.

== Legacy ==
Fisher's contribution to the theatre in Wales has been described as vital. Most surviving works and papers are retained in the National Library of Wales, Aberystwyth, in the archives departments in the University of Wales, Bangor, and with the archivist in Llangefni.
