= 1960 in Scotland =

- Centuries: 18th; 19th; 20th; 21st
- Decades: 1940s; 1950s; 1960s; 1970s; 1980s
- See also: List of years in Scotland; Timeline of Scottish history 1960 in: The UK • England • Wales • Elsewhere; Scottish football: 1959–60 • 1960–61; 1960 in Scottish television

Events from the year 1960 in Scotland.

== Incumbents ==
- Secretary of State for Scotland and Keeper of the Great Seal – John Maclay

=== Law officers ===
- Lord Advocate – William Rankine Milligan; then William Grant
- Solicitor General for Scotland – William Grant until May; then David Colville Anderson

=== Judiciary ===
- Lord President of the Court of Session and Lord Justice General – Lord Clyde
- Lord Justice Clerk – Lord Thomson
- Chairman of the Scottish Land Court – Lord Gibson

== Events ==
- 16 January – the last regular ship on the Cork–Glasgow crossing runs, ending a 103-year-old service.
- 2 March – Elvis Presley stops off at Glasgow Prestwick Airport for a few hours on his journey home to the United States after doing military service in West Germany. This is notable for being the only time he ever visits the UK. His ancestor, blacksmith Andrew Presley, migrated from Lonmay to North Carolina in 1745.
- 14 March – Jock Stein is appointed manager of Dunfermline Athletic F.C.
- 28 March – Cheapside Street Whisky Bond Fire in Glasgow: 19 firemen killed in Britain's worst peacetime fire services disaster.
- 18 May – 1960 European Cup Final at Hampden Park, Glasgow: Real Madrid C.F. defeat Eintracht Frankfurt 7-3, Rangers F.C. having been knocked out by Frankfurt in the semi-finals.
- 21 June – the Royal Highland Show opens for the first time at its permanent site, the Royal Highland Showground at Ingliston in the Lowlands.
- August – murder of the Little Ross lighthouse keeper.
- 7 September – North Ford Causeway opened, connecting North Uist and Benbecula via Grimsay (5 miles (8 km)), completing an all-weather road link between North and South Uist.
- October – Queen's Bridge in Perth opened.
- 30 October – Michael Woodruff performs the first successful kidney transplantation in the UK, at the Edinburgh Royal Infirmary.
- 5 November – Glasgow area suburban train services electrified.
- 24 December – The rebuilt Barrowland Ballroom reopens in Glasgow.
- Seafield Colliery at Kirkcaldy opens.
- Little Houses Improvement Scheme launched by the National Trust for Scotland to promote conservation of vernacular architecture.

== Births ==
- 7 February – Steve Bronski, born Steve Forrest, synth-pop keyboardist (died 2021)
- 11 February – Momus, born Nicholas Currie, songwriter
- February – Lesley Riddoch, political journalist and broadcaster
- 10 March – Anne MacKenzie, broadcast journalist
- 23 March – Nicol Stephen, Liberal Democrat MSP, leader of the Scottish Liberal Democrats (2005–2008) and Deputy First Minister of Scotland (2005–2007)
- 3 April – Shona McIsaac, Labour politician
- 28 April – Ian Rankin, crime novelist
- 5 May – David Nish, businessman
- 19 June – Paul Coia, television presenter
- 24 June – Elish Angiolini, née McPhilomy, Solicitor General for Scotland (2001–2006) and Lord Advocate (2006–2011)
- 30 June – Jack McConnell, First Minister of Scotland (2001–2007)
- 20 August – Annabelle Ewing, Nationalist politician and lawyer
- 10 September – Margaret Ferrier, Scottish National Party politician
- 26 September – Stephen Kerr, Conservative politician
- 6 October – Richard Jobson, rock singer-songwriter (Skids), filmmaker and television presenter
- 12 December – Benny Higgins, banker
- 22 December – Elvis McGonagall, born Richard Smith, slam poet
- Katrina Porteous, poet

== Deaths ==
- 11 January – Isabel Emslie Hutton, nurse in Serbia during World War I and psychiatrist (born 1887)
- 15 August – Rachel Annand Taylor, poet (born 1876)
- 17 August – Calum Maclean, folklorist (born 1915)
- 24 August – Charlotte Ainslie, educationalist and headmistress (born 1863)
- 21 October – Katharine Stewart-Murray, Duchess of Atholl, "Red Duchess", Scottish politician and humanitarian (born 1874)
- 13 December – Dora Marsden, radical feminist and modernist literary editor (born 1882)

== The arts ==
- 20–28 May – The Beatles, as the Silver Beetles (uncredited), play their first ever tour, as a backing group for Johnny Gentle on a tour of Scotland opening at Alloa Town Hall and ending at Peterhead. The lineup comprises John Lennon, Paul McCartney, George Harrison, Edinburgh-born Stuart Sutcliffe and Tommy Moore.
- 10 August – The Scottish National Gallery of Modern Art opens at Inverleith House in the Royal Botanic Garden Edinburgh.
- August – Sydney Goodsir Smith's verse play The Wallace ("a Triumph in Five Acts") has its stage première at the Edinburgh Festival in the General Assembly Hall of the Church of Scotland.
- Autumn – release of Andy Stewart's recordings of "A Scottish Soldier" and "Donald Where's Your Troosers?"
- Donald Sutherland acts at the Perth Repertory Theatre, working alongside Michael Sheard.

== See also ==
- 1960 in Northern Ireland
