= David Davies (footballer, born 1879) =

Welsh footballer

Personal information
- Full name: David Charles Davies
- Date of birth: 1879
- Place of birth: Talgarth, Wales
- Date of death: 13 September 1956
- Place of death: Talgarth, Wales
- Position: Outside left

Senior career*
Years	Team	Apps	(Gls)
1897–1898	Talgarth		
1898–1899	Builth		
1899	Brecon		
1899–1901?	Hereford Town		
1908	Talgarth		

International career
1899–1900	Wales	2	(0)
- * Club domestic league appearances and goals

David Charles Davies ISM (1879 – 13 September 1956) known as "Chappie" was a Welsh footballer who played at outside-left for various minor sides around the turn of the twentieth century as well as making two appearances for Wales.

== Football career ==
Davies was born in Talgarth, Breconshire. His father, Thomas who died in 1929 was a champion sprinter, nicknamed Tom Talgarth.

He started his football career with the local village side before moving to the larger towns of Builth Wells and Brecon where he earned a reputation as a "star forward", being described in one report as "a very reliable forward, quick in his movements, accurate in his passes and deadly at goal".

His form for Brecon earned him his first cap for Wales in a 1–0 defeat against Ireland at Grosvenor Park, Belfast on 4 March 1899.

In March 1899 he signed with Hereford Town, then playing in the Birmingham & District League. Davies injured his knee in his first league match for Hereford of the 1900/01 season, against Shrewsburywhich restricted his appearances. He later returned to play for Brecon in the Mid-Wales League.

He made his second international appearance on 24 February 1900 when the Welsh defeated the Irish 2–0 at The Oval, Llandudno.

== Life outside football ==
He married a girl from Herefordshire in August 1901. Davies was employed by the General Post Office for many years and was awarded the Imperial Service Medal for long service.
