= Watkin William Price =

Welsh schoolmaster and researcher

Watkin William Price, usually referred to as W. W. Price (4 September 1873 – 31 December 1967), was a local historian, schoolmaster and political activist at Aberdare, South Wales.

== Early life ==
Price was born on 4 September 1873 at 261 Cardiff Road, Aberaman, the son of Watkin and Sarah Price. His Welsh-speaking parents had moved to the area from Breconshire. He attended Blaengwawr Elementary School and after leaving formal education found work at the offices of Tarian y Gweithiwr, the Welsh language weekly newspaper published at Aberdare. He became a pupil teacher at local schools before enrolling as a student at University College Cardiff in 1895.

== Teaching career ==
After three years teaching in Cardiff, he returned to the Aberdare area. He was successively appointed as headmaster of Llwydcoed (1912), Cap Coch (1921) and Blaengwawr (1924) schools; he retired from teaching in 1933.

== Local historian ==
Price spent many years researching local history, an interest that began with preparing an essay for the national eisteddfod in 1920. His work remains of value to historians today and his manuscripts are kept at the National Library of Wales.

== Personal life ==
He married Margaret Williams in 1901 and they had four sons and one daughter.
