= Julie Williams (scientist) =

Welsh neuropsychologist

Julie Williams CBE FLSW FMedSci (born 1957) is Professor of Neuropsychological Genetics at Cardiff University and was Chief Scientific Adviser for Wales from 2013 to 2017. She is one of the world's leading contributors to Alzheimer's research.

== Early life and education ==
She was born in Merthyr Tydfil, Wales, and grew up in Cefn Coed and attended Vaynor and Penderyn Grammar School. She went on to study psychology at Cardiff University.

== Achievements ==
Williams is Professor of Neuropsychological Genetics and Head of the Neurodegeneration section of the Medical Research Council Centre for Neuropsychiatric Genetics and Genomics at Cardiff University. She is a former Chief Scientific Adviser to the Alzheimer's Research Trust, and in 2012 was appointed a CBE for her contribution to Alzheimer's research. She is a Fellow of the Learned Society of Wales and was elected a Fellow of the Academy of Medical Sciences in 2014.

Professor Julie Williams was Chief Scientific Adviser for Wales from September 2013 to September 2017, the second person to hold the post. Edwina Hart, Minister for the Economy, Science and Transport, said "She is a great role model for women in science ...Her networks of national and international scientists will be crucial in opening the doors for Wales".

== Research ==
Williams' research aims to identify and characterise genes which confer a risk of developing psychological and neurodegenerative disorders such as Alzheimer's disease, developmental dyslexia, and schizophrenia. She has received funding from the Wellcome Trust, MRC and the Health Foundation.
