= Len Apsey =

Welsh footballer

Personal information
- Full name: Thomas Leonard Apsey
- Date of birth: 11 February 1910
- Place of birth: Ynyshir, Wales
- Date of death: 1967 (aged 56–57)
- Position: Centre forward

Senior career*
Years	Team	Apps	(Gls)
1930–1931	Newport County	2	(0)
1931	Burnley	0	(0)
1931	Arsenal	0	(0)
- * Club domestic league appearances and goals

Thomas Leonard Apsey (11 February 1910 – 1967) was a Welsh professional footballer who played as a centre forward. He played two English Football League matches for Newport County.
