= 1961 in Scotland =

- Centuries: 18th; 19th; 20th; 21st
- Decades: 1940s; 1950s; 1960s; 1970s; 1980s
- See also: List of years in Scotland; Timeline of Scottish history 1961 in: The UK • Wales • Elsewhere; Scottish football: 1960–61 • 1961–62; 1961 in Scottish television

Events from the year 1961 in Scotland.

== Incumbents ==
- Secretary of State for Scotland and Keeper of the Great Seal – John Maclay

=== Law officers ===
- Lord Advocate – William Grant
- Solicitor General for Scotland – David Colville Anderson

=== Judiciary ===
- Lord President of the Court of Session and Lord Justice General – Lord Clyde
- Lord Justice Clerk – Lord Thomson
- Chairman of the Scottish Land Court – Lord Gibson

== Events ==
- 3 March – Holy Loch becomes the United States Navy's FBM Refit Site One and home base to its Submarine Squadron 14 (equipped with Polaris nuclear missiles) with the arrival of tender USS Proteus.
- 10 May – St. Andrew's Catholic Cathedral in Dumfries is destroyed by fire.
- 17 May – Rangers F.C. become the first British team to reach a European final but lose the first leg of the Final of the 1960–61 European Cup Winners' Cup at Ibrox, 2–0.
- 27 May – Rangers lose the second leg of the Final of the 1960–61 European Cup Winners' Cup, 2-1, to lose over the two legs by 4–1.
- 1 September – Border Television goes on air.
- 16 September – Three people die and 35 are injured when a stand collapses during a Rangers F.C. football match at Ibrox Park.
- 16–17 September – remnants of Atlantic Hurricane Debbie track across Scotland.
- 30 September – Grampian Television goes on air.
- 13 October – The British Motor Corporation's Bathgate Lorry Plant begins production.
- 16 November – Glasgow Bridgeton by-election: Labour retains the seat although the Scottish National Party achieves an 18% share of the vote, only narrowly failing to take second place.
- Completion of Howford Bridge carrying the A76 road over River Ayr near Catrine (the longest reinforced concrete arch span in Scotland at this date); and new Ness Bridge in Inverness.
- Remains of Rosneath House blown up.
- Release of short documentary film Seawards the Great Ships, which will be the first Scottish film to win an Academy Award.
- Caithness Glass established in Wick, Caithness, by Robin Sinclair, 2nd Viscount Thurso.

== Births ==
- 4 January – Graham McTavish, actor
- 20 January – Janey Godley, comedian and writer (died 2024)
- 14 February – Alison Saunders, Director of Public Prosecutions (England and Wales)
- 1 April – Susan Boyle, singer
- 6 April – Rory Bremner, impressionist, playwright and comedian
- 10 April – Nicky Campbell, broadcast presenter
- 14 April – Robert Carlyle, actor
- 22 April – Ann McKechin, Labour MP from 2001
- 6 May – Tom Hunter, entrepreneur and philanthropist
- 7 May – Sue Black, forensic anthropologist
- 13 May – Ralph Milne, footballer (died 2015)
- 16 May – Sarah Boyack, Labour MSP from 1999
- 5 June – Rosie Kane, born Rosemary McGarvey, Socialist MSP from 2003 to 2007
- 22 June – Jimmy Somerville, pop singer
- 24 June – Iain Glen, actor
- 10 July – Carol Anne Davis, crime writer
- 18 September – Michael McMahon, Labour MSP from 2011
- 22 September – Liam Fox, Conservative MP from 1992
- 9 November – Jackie Kay, poet and novelist
- 18 November – Steven Moffat, television writer
- 23 December – Carol Smillie, television presenter
- 29 December – Jim Reid, alternative rock singer-songwriter
- 2 December – Richard Quinn, jockey
- 30 December – Charlie Nicholas, international footballer
- W. N. Herbert, poet
- Kevin Williamson, political activist

== Deaths ==
- 30 January – John Duncan Fergusson, Scottish Colourist painter (born 1874)
- 1 October – Sir William Reid Dick, sculptor (born 1879)
- 13 October – John MacCormick, lawyer and advocate of Home Rule (born 1904)

== The arts ==
- Muriel Spark's novel The Prime of Miss Jean Brodie is published.
- Marmalade formed as The Gaylords in Baillieston.

== See also ==
- 1961 in Northern Ireland
