= Peter Lawlor (cricketer) =

Welsh cricketer (born 1960)

Peter John Lawlor (born 8 May 1960) is a Welsh former cricketer active in 1981 who was born in Gowerton and played for Glamorgan. He appeared in one first-class match as a righthanded batsman who bowled off breaks. He scored eight runs and took one wicket.
