= 1964 in Scotland =

- Centuries: 18th; 19th; 20th; 21st
- Decades: 1940s; 1950s; 1960s; 1970s; 1980s
- See also: List of years in Scotland; Timeline of Scottish history 1964 in: The UK • Wales • Elsewhere; Scottish football: 1963–64 • 1964–65; 1964 in Scottish television

Events from the year 1964 in Scotland.

== Incumbents ==
- Secretary of State for Scotland and Keeper of the Great Seal – Michael Noble until 16 October; then Willie Ross

=== Law officers ===
- Lord Advocate – Ian Shearer, Lord Avonside; then Gordon Stott
- Solicitor General for Scotland – David Colville Anderson; then Henry Wilson

=== Judiciary ===
- Lord President of the Court of Session and Lord Justice General – Lord Clyde
- Lord Justice Clerk – Lord Grant
- Chairman of the Scottish Land Court – Lord Gibson

== Events ==
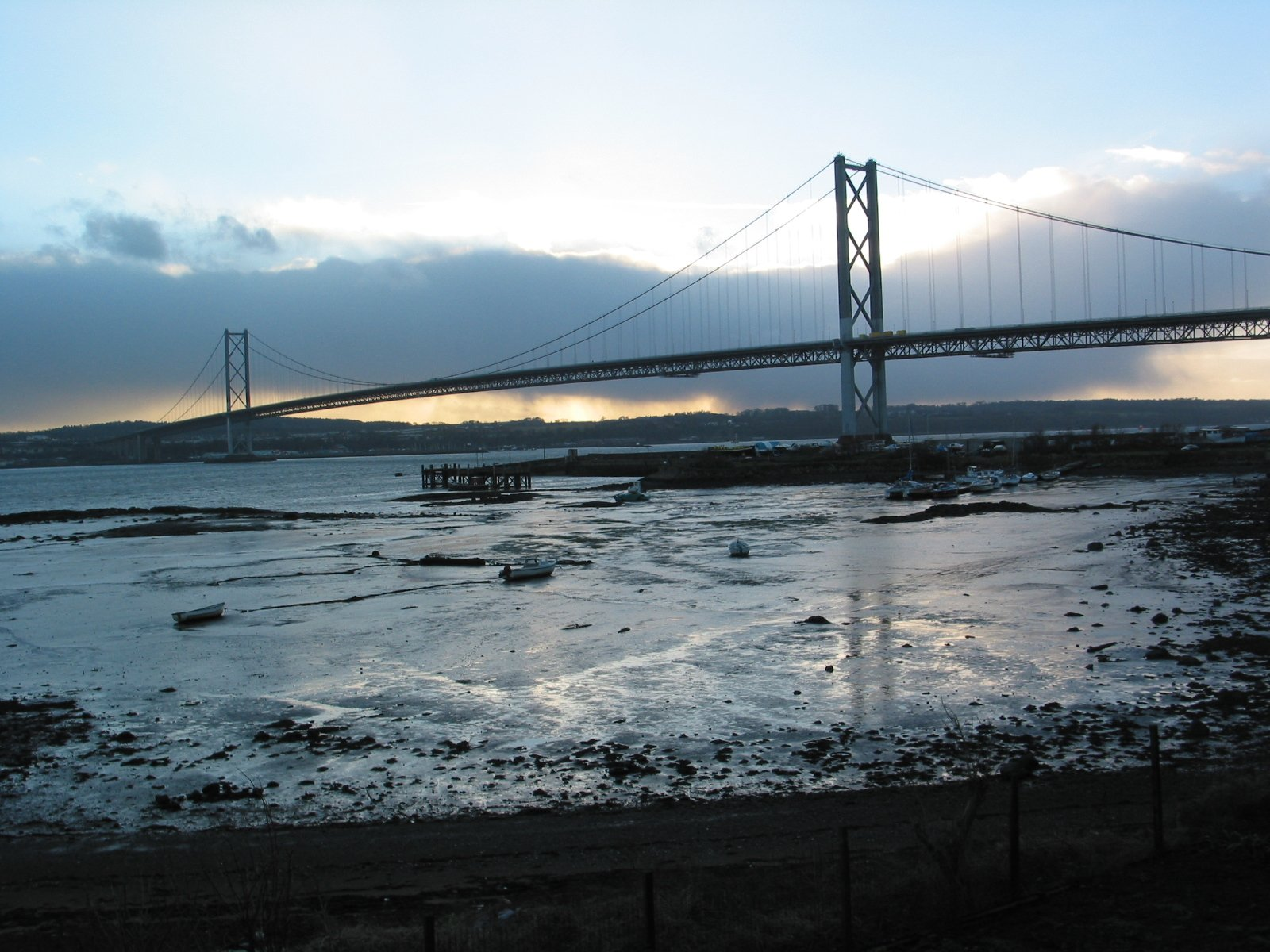
Forth Road Bridge

- 11 January – Nationwide UK teenage girls' magazine Jackie is first published by DC Thomson of Dundee.
- 29 April – 1964 Aberdeen typhoid outbreak: All schools in Aberdeen are closed following 136 cases of typhoid being reported.
- 30 April – Breakthrough on 2.5-mile (4.0 km) tunnel 500 metres (1,600 ft) under the Firth of Forth to link the colliery at Valleyfield, Fife, to the modern coal processing facilities at Kinneil colliery near Bo'ness.
- 14 May – Rutherglen by-election: Labour gains seat from the Conservatives.
- 20 May – 1964 Aberdeen typhoid outbreak begins.
- 23 June – University of Strathclyde chartered.
- 4 September – The Forth Road Bridge opens across the Firth of Forth, connecting Fife and Edinburgh.
- 22 September – Hunterston A nuclear power station opens.
- 15 October – United Kingdom general election: Labour defeats Sir Alec Douglas-Home's Conservatives and the Unionist Party in Scotland loses eight seats.
- 20 November – The first part of the M8 motorway between Glasgow and Edinburgh is opened.
- HMNB Clyde established by the Royal Navy at Faslane on the Gare Loch.
- William Grant & Sons first market their Glenfiddich distillery Speyside single malt whisky in bottles internationally.

== Births ==
- 2 January – Michael McCann, lawyer and politician
- 29 January – Roddy Frame, singer-songwriter and guitarist
- 2 February – Susan Deacon, Labour politician and MSP (1999–2007)
- 12 February – Stephen Carter, businessman and politician
- 19 February – Jim McInally, international footballer and manager
- 7 March – Tommy Sheridan, socialist politician and MSP (1999–2007)
- 13 April – John Swinney, Scottish National Party leader and government minister
- 18 April – Niall Ferguson, historian
- 24 May – Liz McColgan, athlete
- 31 May – Billy Davies, footballer and manager
- 27 June – Shona Marshall, sport shooter
- 1 August – Fiona Hyslop, Scottish National Party MSP (1999– ) and government minister
- 9 September – John Hughes, footballer and manager
- 4 October – Yvonne Murray, middle- and long-distance runner
- 8 October – James Grant, new wave singer-songwriter
- 13 November – Paul McBride, criminal lawyer (died 2012)
- 4 December – Scott Hastings, rugby player (died 2026)
- 11 December – Justin Currie, singer-songwriter
- 25 December – Gary McAllister, international footballer, manager and coach
- Dorothy Bain, Lord Advocate
- Stephen Conroy, painter
- Aminatta Forna, novelist
- Jim Lambie, installation artist
- Gillian Reid, chemist
- Alan Warner, novelist

== Deaths ==
- 31 May – Nikolai Orlov, classical pianist (born 1892 in Russia)
- 21 July – John White, international footballer (born 1937)
- 25 September – Robert Wilson, tenor (born 1907)
- 3 December – Dot Allan, writer (born 1886)
- 11 December – Charles Donaldson, Conservative politician (born 1903)
- 31 December – Ronald Fairbairn, psychoanalyst (born 1889)

== The arts ==
- 15 December – Peter Watkins' docudrama Culloden is broadcast on BBC Television.

== See also ==
- 1964 in Northern Ireland
- 1964 in Wales
