= Fiona Bennett =

Welsh composer

Fiona Bennett (born 1962) is a Welsh composer of classical music.

== Career overview ==
Bennett was born in Cardiff and studied at the Guildhall School of Music in London. After graduating, she formed a band called "Route 66", which performed at Highclere Castle. and also sang with her own jazz trio. She married businessman Bob Rae, and they had two children, Dominic and Zachary, before divorcing. Zachary was diagnosed with autism in 2006, and Bennett gave up her music career temporarily to look after him. She took up composing again at the age of fifty, and hired a studio to record some of her pieces under her own "ELF Records" label.

In 2014, Bennett began advertising her album A Country Suite on radio. The following year, she campaigned to get listeners to vote for her music in the annual Classic FM "Top 300" listeners' poll; as a result, her pieces 'The Landscape', 'A Lad and a Lass' and 'Tempus Fugit' entered the station's "Hall of Fame".

In 2016, her "New Lady Radnor Suite" entered the Hall of Fame at no 231.

In 2017, Bennett reached no. 210 in the Classic FM Hall of Fame Top 300 with her album, 'A Country Suite'.
