= 1965 in Scotland =

- Centuries: 18th; 19th; 20th; 21st
- Decades: 1940s; 1950s; 1960s; 1970s; 1980s
- See also: List of years in Scotland; Timeline of Scottish history 1965 in: The UK • Wales • Elsewhere; Scottish football: 1964–65 • 1965–66; 1965 in Scottish television

Events from the year 1965 in Scotland.

== Incumbents ==
- Secretary of State for Scotland and Keeper of the Great Seal – Willie Ross

=== Law officers ===
- Lord Advocate – Gordon Stott
- Solicitor General for Scotland – Henry Wilson

=== Judiciary ===
- Lord President of the Court of Session and Lord Justice General – Lord Clyde
- Lord Justice Clerk – Lord Grant
- Chairman of the Scottish Land Court – Lord Gibson until 12 April; then Lord Birsay

== Events ==
- March – Cables Wynd House ("Banana Flats") completed in Leith.
- 24 March – Roxburgh, Selkirk and Peebles by-election: David Steel (Liberal) gains the seat from the Conservatives.
- 12 April – Harald Leslie becomes Chairman of the Scottish Land Court, with the judicial title Lord Birsay. He replaces Lord Gibson.
- 15 June – Law Commissions Act 1965, establishing the Scottish Law Commission, receives royal assent.
- August – Union Canal officially closed to navigation.
- 5 August – the Registration of Births, Deaths and Marriages (Scotland) Act 1965 receives royal assent.
- 11 August – first edition of The Celtic View, the official weekly magazine of Celtic F.C. in Glasgow, is published.
- 20 August – Cassius Clay fights an exhibition bout at the Ice Rink, Paisley.
- 6 September – Edinburgh Princes Street railway station is officially closed.
- 15 October – the Cruachan Dam pumped-storage hydroelectricity scheme at Ben Cruachan near Oban opens.
- 8 November – the Murder (Abolition of Death Penalty) Act suspends capital punishment for murder in England, Scotland and Wales, for five years in the first instance, replacing it with a mandatory sentence of life imprisonment.
- November – Harthill Bypass opened, first section of the M8 motorway and the first substantive section of motorway in Scotland.
- The Unionist Party in Scotland is renamed the Scottish Conservative and Unionist Party and constitutionally comes under the control of the London-based Conservative Party.
- Construction of the town of Dalgety Bay begins.
- Highlands and Islands Development Board formed.
- Corpach pulp and paper mills open.

== Births ==
- 18 January – Paul Flexney, footballer
- 20 January – Colin Calderwood, international footballer and coach
- 22 January – Brian McCardie, actor
- 27 January – Alan Cumming, actor
- 6 February – Simone Lahbib, actress
- 11 February – Keith Cochrane, businessman
- 14 February – Ian Spittal, footballer
- 16 February – Ally Maxwell, footballer and coach
- 22 February – John Leslie (born John Leslie Stott), television presenter
- 5 March – Carolyn Leckie, Scottish Socialist Party MSP (2003–2007)
- 8 March – Paul Martin, footballer and manager
- 20 March – William Dalrymple, historian
- 22 March – Rob Wainwright, international rugby union footballer
- 23 March – Marti Pellow (born Mark McLachlan), singer
- 26 March – Pat McFadden, Labour MP (Wolverhampton 2005– )
- 6 April – Andy Walker, footballer and TV pundit
- 11 April – Lynn Ferguson, writer, actress, comedian and presenter
- 25 April – Ally Dick, footballer
- 16 May – Stuart Millar, football player and manager
- 17 May – Keith Wright, international footballer
- 24 May – Brian Irvine, international footballer
- 28 May – Vic Kasule, footballer
- 5 June – Allan Guthrie, literary agent, author and editor of crime fiction
- 19 June – A. B. Jackson, poet
- 22 June – Jimmy Sandison, footballer
- 3 July – Tommy Flanagan, actor
- 9 July – David O'Hara, actor
- 12 July – Eric Cullen, actor (died 1996)
- 15 July – Alistair Carmichael, Liberal Democrat politician and Secretary of State for Scotland
- 19 July – Evelyn Glennie, virtuosa percussionist
- 24 July – Julie Graham, actress
- 26 July – Hamish Clark, actor
- 11 August – Robert Fleck, international footballer and manager
- 30 August – Peter Grant, international footballer and manager
- 5 September – Murdo Fraser, Conservative MSP (2001– )
- 11 September:
  - Robert Docherty, footballer
  - Graeme Obree, racing cyclist
- 14 September – Paul McFadden, footballer
- 27 September – Rhona Cameron, comedian
- 14 October – Sandy Stewart, footballer and manager
- 20 October – Norman Blake, singer, instrumentalist and songwriter
- 22 October – A. L. Kennedy, fiction writer
- 29 October – Paul Stewart, racing driver
- 12 November – Eddie Mair, radio and television presenter
- 19 November – Douglas Henshall, actor
- 24 November – Shirley Henderson, actress
- 25 November – Dougray Scott, actor
- 28 November – Caroline Paterson, actress
- 11 December – Alison Watt, painter
- 13 December – Hugh Burns, footballer
- 20 December – Robert Cavanah, actor, writer, director and producer
- 21 December – Stuart Mitchell, pianist and composer
- 31 December – Mike Conroy, footballer
- Unknown
  - Anne Bevan, visual artist, sculptor and lecturer
  - Christine Borland, sculptor
  - Patricia Littlechild, sport shooter and neurosurgeon
  - Susan Philipsz, sound artist

== Deaths ==
- 7 January – Anne Redpath, domestic painter (born 1895)
- 1 February – Robert Spence, Labour MP
- 14 February – David Ferguson Hunter, recipient of the Victoria Cross (born 1891)
- 30 April – James William Slessor Marr, marine biologist and polar explorer (born 1902)
- 17 March – Walter Potter Ritchie, recipient of the Victoria Cross (born 1892)
- 31 March – Gerard Crole, international rugby union and cricket player (born 1894)
- 9 April – Robert Gibson, Lord Gibson, lawyer and Labour MP
- 9 May – Hugh O'Donnell, footballer (born 1913)
- 16 July – William Reid, Scottish Labour Party Member of Parliament from 1950 to 1964 (born 1889)
- 2 August – John Carmont, High Court Judge (born 1890)
- 12 August – Willie Gallacher, trade unionist, activist and communist MP (born 1881)
- 5 September – Tom Johnston, Labour MP, government minister and chairman of North of Scotland Hydro-Electric Board (born 1881)
- 8 October – James Nelson, international footballer (born 1901)
- 20 October – William Thomas Shaw, Unionist Party MP (born 1879)

== The arts ==
- George Mackay Brown's poetry The Year of the Whale is published.
- The Royal Glasgow Institute of the Fine Arts opens the Kelly Gallery.
- 31 December – "Pirate" radio station Radio Scotland begins broadcasting from LV Comet anchored outside U.K. territorial waters off Dunbar.

== See also ==
- 1965 in Northern Ireland
