= 1958 in Scotland =

- Centuries: 18th; 19th; 20th; 21st
- Decades: 1930s; 1940s; 1950s; 1960s; 1970s
- See also: List of years in Scotland; Timeline of Scottish history 1958 in: The UK • Wales • Elsewhere; Scottish football: 1957–58 • 1958–59; 1958 in Scottish television

Events from the year 1958 in Scotland.

== Incumbents ==
- Secretary of State for Scotland and Keeper of the Great Seal – John Maclay

=== Law officers ===
- Lord Advocate – William Rankine Milligan
- Solicitor General for Scotland – William Grant

=== Judiciary ===
- Lord President of the Court of Session and Lord Justice General – Lord Clyde
- Lord Justice Clerk – Lord Thomson
- Chairman of the Scottish Land Court – Lord Gibson

== Events ==
- 13 March – Glasgow Kelvingrove by-election results in a Labour gain from the Unionists
- May – nuclear development: Dounreay materials test reactor achieves criticality
- 3 May – Aberdeen Corporation Tramways cease to operate, leaving Glasgow as the only tram network in Scotland. (The latter would close four years later in 1962)
- 20 May – railway collision at Arklestone Junction, Paisley; 97 injured
- 7 June – Ian Donald publishes an article in The Lancet describing the diagnostic use of ultrasound in obstetrics as pioneered in Glasgow
- 4 July – St Ninian's Isle Treasure discovered in Shetland by schoolboy Douglas Coutts
- 11 July – Peter Manuel hanged at HM Prison Barlinnie for at least seven murders
- 18 August – Regional postage stamps of Great Britain are first issued
- 1 September – First of the 'Cod Wars' between the UK and Iceland over fishing rights breaks out
- 15 September – British Railways railbuses introduced on Gleneagles–Crieff–Comrie line
- 19 September – John Duncan Mackie is appointed Historiographer Royal
- October – Thurso High School opened
- 21 November – Construction of the Forth Road Bridge begins. It would open on 4 September 1964, following a ceremony by Queen Elizabeth II and the Duke of Edinburgh
- 5 December – Subscriber trunk dialling (STD) is inaugurated on the UK telephone network when The Queen makes a call from Bristol to Edinburgh and speaks to the Lord Provost
- 25 December – Christmas Day is a public holiday in Scotland for the first time
- Neolithic Tomb of the Eagles on South Ronaldsay in Orkney first explored by Ronald Simison

== Births ==
- 30 January – Derek White, rugby player
- 9 February – Sandy Lyle, golfer
- 22 February – Gordon Kennedy, actor
- 27 March – Peter Howson, figurative painter, war artist
- 14 April – Peter Capaldi, screen actor
- 25 April – Fish (Derek William Dick), neo-progressive rock singer
- 26 April – John Crichton-Stuart, 7th Marquess of Bute (John Bute or Johnny Dumfries), racing driver (died 2021)
- 3 June – Cameron Sharp, sprinter
- 17 May – Alan Rankine, musician and producer
- 2 August – Elaine C. Smith, comic actress
- 17 August – Fred Goodwin, banker
- 30 August – Muriel Gray, broadcaster
- 20 September – Maureen Baker, physician
- 27 September – Irvine Welsh, novelist, playwright and short story writer
- Christina McAnea, trade union leader
- Harry Ritchie, writer and journalist
- James Robertson, novelist
- Adrian Wiszniewski, figurative painter

== Deaths ==
- 8 January – Walter Elliot, Scottish Unionist Party MP (born 1888)
- 29 March – Sir William Burrell, shipowner and art collector (born 1861)
- 2 April – Mary Barbour, political activist, local councillor and magistrate (born 1875)
- 3 September – Norman Kemp Smith, philosopher (born 1872)
- 19 September – Sir John Dick-Lauder, 11th Baronet, soldier (born 1883 in British India)

== The arts ==
- 7 May – first broadcast of the BBC television variety show The White Heather Club which airs nationally until 1968

== See also ==
- 1958 in Northern Ireland
