= Alec James (cricketer) =

Welsh cricketer

Personal information
- Full name: Alec Pearce James
- Born: 22 May 1889; Neath, Glamorgan, Wales
- Died: 14 August 1961 (aged 72); Torquay, Devon, England
- Bowling: Right-arm fast-medium

Domestic team information
- Years: Team
- 1914/15: South Australia
- 1910: Carmarthenshire

Career statistics
Competition	First-class
Matches	4
Runs scored	93
Batting average	13.28
100s/50s	–/–
Top score	23
Balls bowled	986
Wickets	13
Bowling average	35.92
5 wickets in innings	–
10 wickets in match	–
Best bowling	3/56
Catches/stumpings	6/–
- Source: Cricinfo, 7 June 2011

Alec Pearce James (22 May 1889 – 14 August 1961) was a Welsh cricketer. James's batting style is unknown, but it is known he bowled right-arm fast-medium. He was born in Neath, Glamorgan.

James made his debut for Carmarthenshire in the 1910 Minor Counties Championship against Monmouthshire. James played 5 further Minor Counties Championship for Carmarthenshire in 1910, the last coming against Cornwall.

Moving to Australia, where he taught at St Peter's College, Adelaide, James made his first-class debut for South Australia in December 1914, against New South Wales. He made 3 further first-class appearances for South Australia, the last coming against Victoria in February 1915. In his 4 appearances, he scored 93 runs at a batting average of 13.28, with a high score of 23. With the ball, he took 13 wickets at a bowling average of 35.92, with best figures of 3/56.

He died in Torquay, England on 14 August 1961.
