= Claude Warner =

Welsh cricketer

Personal information
- Full name: Claude Charles Warner
- Born: 31 March 1882; Cardiff, Glamorgan, Wales
- Died: 29 December 1965 (aged 83); Llanelli, Carmarthenshire, Wales
- Batting: Right-handed
- Bowling: Right-arm medium

Domestic team information
- Years: Team
- 1923: Glamorgan
- 1920: Carmarthenshire

Career statistics
| Competition | First-class |
|---|---|
| Matches | 1 |
| Runs scored | 14 |
| Batting average | 14.00 |
| 100s/50s | –/– |
| Top score | 7* |
| Balls bowled | 90 |
| Wickets | – |
| Bowling average | – |
| 5 wickets in innings | – |
| 10 wickets in match | – |
| Best bowling | – |
| Catches/stumpings | –/– |
- Source: Cricinfo, 7 August 2012

Claude Warner (31 March 1882 – 29 December 1965) was a Welsh cricketer. He was a right-handed batsman and a right-arm medium-pace seam bowler.

Warner played his club cricket for Carmarthenshire, his most notable in 1920 against future team Glamorgan, for whom he was only called up in just a single first-class match, during the 1923 County Championship season. However, Glamorgan lost by an innings margin, and Warner, aged 41 by this time, was never called up again to the Glamorgan side.

By trade, Warner was a stockbroker, and took up cricket in his spare time, playing at club level either side of the First World War.
