= Mary Myfanwy Wood =

- Born: September 16, 1882; London
- Died: January 22, 1967 (aged 84); Shoreham-by-Sea
- Employer: London Missionary Society

Mary Myfanwy Wood (aka Wu Yingzhen, Wu Ying-chen, and Wu Ying Chun) (16 September 1882 – 22 January 1967) was a British missionary in China from 1908 to 1951.

== Life ==
Wood was born in London in 1882 to Welsh parents. Her mother, Hannah, was from Swansea in south Wales and her father was from Machynlleth in west Wales. She had been educated and trained as a teacher.

In 1903 she heard a talk by the principal of Mansfield College in Oxford. The Reverend William Boothby (W. B.) Selbie inspired Wood to consider a career as a missionary. The London Missionary Society initially found her work in London but by 1908 she was in Siao Chang in northern China where she worked for seven years at a boarding school.

She returned to Britain for a year where she attended Selbie's college in Oxford. When she returned to China she became to head teacher of the Girls' Middle School in Beijing. Besides her contribution to education she also assisted the emerging Christian church in the China for Christ Movement. She was said to be vice-President at one point and in 1922 she took time out to organise a National Christian conference in Shanghai in 1922. She worked with C. Y. Cheng and the American Presbyterian Edwin Carlyle (E. C.) Lobenstine. Lobenstein was involved with the controversially titled book The Christian Occupation of China which was also published in 1922. In 1926 she became a lecturer at Yenching University and by 1928 she was head of the department of religious studies. Wood travelled to both America and back to Britain to ensure that she had a modern curriculum.

During the war she spend two years caring for her aged parents, but her fluent Chinese language skills were also in demand. At the end of the second world war she moved from China to India where she assisted service women under the management of the YMCA.

Wood was in China until 1952 when she regretfully returned to Britain. She approved of the revolution in China but as a foreigner she was a hazardous friend. Ten years later she was awarded an honorary degree by the University of Wales.

Wood was appointed a Congregational minister to a small church in Hambleden in her seventies and she died in Shoreham-by-Sea in 1967.
