= 1966 in Wales =

- Centuries: 18th; 19th; 20th; 21st
- Decades: 1940s; 1950s; 1960s; 1970s; 1980s
- See also: List of years in Wales; Timeline of Welsh history 1966 in The United Kingdom Scotland Elsewhere

This article is about the particular significance of the year 1966 to Wales and its people.

== Incumbents ==
- Secretary of State for Wales – Jim Griffiths (until 5 April); Cledwyn Hughes
- Archbishop of Wales – Edwin Morris, Bishop of Monmouth
- Archdruid of the National Eisteddfod of Wales
  - Cynan (outgoing)
  - E. Gwyndaf Evans (incoming)

== Events ==
- April – Future Welsh Secretary Peter Hain arrives in the UK from South Africa with his family.
- 12 May – Local elections take place across the county boroughs and districts, with the Conservatives winning a majority on Cardiff City Council for the first time in years.
- 18 June – Butlin's Barry Island holiday camp opens.
- 14 July – In the Carmarthen by-election, caused by the death of Megan Lloyd George, Gwynfor Evans wins Plaid Cymru's first Parliamentary seat.
- 22 July
  - Fifteen people are drowned when an overloaded trip boat collides with the Penmaenpool toll bridge in the Mawddach estuary.
  - The M4 motorway Port Talbot by-pass is officially opened by The Queen.
- 8 September – The Severn Bridge is opened.
- 21 October – At Aberfan, following heavy rain, a colliery waste tip collapses onto the village's primary school, killing 116 children and 28 adults. Cledwyn Hughes, Secretary of State for Wales, and his government colleague, George Thomas arrive on the scene late afternoon, followed, in the evening, by Prime Minister Harold Wilson.
- 22 October – Lord Robens, chairman of the National Coal Board, arrives in Aberfan after going ahead with his installation as Chancellor of the University of Surrey, despite news of the disaster.
- 26 October – The Welsh Office appoints the Aberfan Disaster Tribunal, chaired by Edmund Davies, Baron Edmund-Davies, to investigate the causes of the disaster.
- 27 October – Almost a week after the Aberfan disaster, writer and broadcaster Gwyn Thomas makes his famous radio tribute to the children of Aberfan.
- 30 October – The Queen and her consort Prince Philip, Duke of Edinburgh, arrive in Aberfan to pay their respects. It is reported that the Queen is moved to tears.
- 15 December – A concert in aid of the Aberfan disaster charity is held at London's Royal Albert Hall.

== Arts and literature ==
=== Awards ===
- British Press Awards – Special Award for Journalism – David Rhys Davies, Merthyr Express
- National Eisteddfod of Wales (held in Aberavon)
- National Eisteddfod of Wales: Chair – Dic Jones, "Cynhaeaf"
- National Eisteddfod of Wales: Crown – Dafydd Jones, "Y Clawdd"
- National Eisteddfod of Wales: Prose Medal – withheld

=== New books ===
==== English language ====
- Peter Bartrum – Early Welsh Genealogical Tracts
- Charles Jones – The Challenger

==== Welsh language ====
- Pennar Davies – Caregl Nwyf
- Dyfnallt Morgan – Gwŷr Llên y Ddeunawfed Ganrif
- Thomas John Morgan – Amryw Flawd

=== New drama ===
- Gwenlyn Parry – Saer Doliau (Doll Doctor)

=== Music ===
- Alun Hoddinott – Concerto no. 3, op. 44
- Severn Bridge Variations (composite work composed by Malcolm Arnold, Alun Hoddinott, Nicholas Maw, Daniel Jones, Grace Williams and Michael Tippett)

== Film ==
- Richard Burton stars in Who's Afraid of Virginia Woolf? alongside his wife Elizabeth Taylor. The performance wins him a BAFTA Best Actor award.

== Broadcasting ==
- BBC Wales opens new studios in Llandaff.
- 19 December – BBC opens Llanidloes transmitting station.

=== English-language television ===
- Hywel Bennett makes an impact in his first major TV role in Where the Buffalo Roam, a Wednesday Play.

== Sport ==
- Athletics – Lynn Davies becomes the first person to hold the European, Commonwealth and Olympic long jump titles simultaneously.
- Football – Ivor Allchurch plays his final game for Wales, against Chile.
- Rugby union
  - Phil Bennett makes his first appearance for Llanelli RFC.
  - Wales win the Five Nations Championship for the third successive year.
- Tennis – Future rugby star J. P. R. Williams wins the junior championship at Wimbledon.
- BBC Wales Sports Personality of the Year – Lynn Davies

== Births ==
- 21 March – Matthew Maynard, cricketer
- 24 March – Mark Williams, Liberal Democrat politician, MP for Ceredigion
- 14 April – Lloyd Owen, actor
- 29 April – Carl Dale, footballer
- 3 May – Darren Morgan, snooker player
- 5 May – Nicky Piper, light-heavyweight boxer
- 8 July – Guto Harri, broadcaster
- 21 July – Sarah Waters, novelist
- 28 July – Andy Legg, footballer
- 16 August – Helen Thomas, Greenham Common campaigner
- 1 September – Elin Jones, Plaid Cymru politician, MS for Ceredigion
- 12 September – Niall Griffiths, English-born novelist
- 22 September – Ruth Jones, actress and writer
- 23 September – Adam Price, Plaid Cymru politician, MP for Carmarthen East & Dinefwr
- 21 October – Phillip Price, golfer
- 10 November – Simon Richardson, paralympic track cyclist
- Date unknown – Saul David, historian

== Deaths ==
- 20 January – Gordon Macdonald MP, politician, 81
- 21 January – William Davies, footballer, 83
- 27 January – Ronald Armstrong-Jones, barrister, 66
- 18 February – Thomas Williams, 1st Baron Williams, 73
- 20 February – Emrys Evans, classicist and academic, 75
- March – Wilfred Mitford Davies, artist and publisher, 71
- April – Charlie Jones, footballer, 66
- 13 April – Lionel Edwards, artist, 87
- 25 April – Iorrie Isaacs, Wales international rugby player, 54
- 26 April – Bill Everson, Wales international rugby player, 60
- 11 May – Thomas Hughes Jones, poet and author, 71
- 14 May – Megan Lloyd George MP, politician, 64
- 1 June – Peter George, author, 42 (suicide)
- 23 June – Melbourne Thomas, rugby player, 70
- 9 June – Elizabeth Watkin-Jones, children's author, 88
- 17 July – Albert Freethy, rugby referee and cricketer, 81
- 23 August – Ivor Hughes, speedway rider, 27 (killed in track accident)
- 27 August – Cecil Pritchard, rugby player, 64
- 21 September – Sir Thomas Williams Phillips, civil servant, 83
- 24 September – Arthur Green, footballer, 85
- 26 September – Phil Hopkins, Wales international rugby player, 86
- 3 December – Iorwerth Thomas, politician, 71
- 23 November – Alvin Langdon Coburn, American-born pictorialist photographer, 84
- date unknown – Simon Bartholomew Jones, minister and poet

== See also ==
- 1966 in Northern Ireland
