= Herbie Baxter =

English cricketer

Herbert Wood Baxter (2 April 1883 — 25 April 1962) was an English cricketer, a right-handed batsman who played for Glamorgan. He was born in Stockport and died in Shaw Heath.

Baxter, who played league cricket with Swansea either side of the First World War, and was appointed their captain in the 1920 season, made a single first-class appearance for Glamorgan during 1921, against Northamptonshire. From the upper-middle order, he scored a single run in the first innings in which he batted, and 10 runs in the second, as Glamorgan lost the match by an innings margin.
