= 1963 in Wales =

- Centuries: 18th; 19th; 20th; 21st
- Decades: 1940s; 1950s; 1960s; 1970s; 1980s
- See also: List of years in Wales; Timeline of Welsh history 1963 in The United Kingdom Scotland Elsewhere

This article is about the particular significance of the year 1963 to Wales and its people.

== Incumbents ==
- Archbishop of Wales – Edwin Morris, Bishop of Monmouth
- Archdruid of the National Eisteddfod of Wales – Cynan

== Events ==
=== February ===
- 2 February – Cymdeithas yr Iaith Gymraeg holds its historic first protest in Aberystwyth, in the form of a sit-down at Trefechan Bridge.
- 9 February – The paramilitary Welsh nationalist organisation Mudiad Amddiffyn Cymru plants a bomb at the construction site of the Tryweryn reservoir.
- date unknown – A record snowfall of nearly 5 ft (1.5m) occurs at Tredegar in Monmouthshire.

=== March ===
- 6 March – After record freezing weather throughout the winter, it is the first day of the year when there is no frost in Wales.
- 28 March – Labour Party candidate Neil McBride wins the Swansea East by-election caused by the death of Labour Member of Parliament (MP) David Mort.

=== June ===
- 28 June – Caerphilly railway works closes.

=== August ===
- August – Mandy Rice-Davies gives evidence at the trial of Stephen Ward, including the famous phrase, "Well, he would, wouldn't he?"

=== September ===
- 16 September – The Western Mail launches a fund-raising campaign to replace a stained glass window to replace the one shattered in the bombing of a church in Birmingham, Alabama, United States, by the Ku Klux Klan on the previous day; the £500 target is reached within days.

=== Date unknown ===
- Dunraven Castle is demolished.

== Arts and literature ==
- The home and cultural centre of Gregynog Hall at Tregynon in Montgomeryshire is given to the University of Wales by owners and art-collectors, Margaret and Gwendoline Davies, granddaughters of Victorian industrialist David Davies.
- A scientific journal in the Welsh language, Y Gwyddonydd, is launched.
- The Beatles play at Mold 24 January; Cardiff 27 May; Abergavenny 22 June; Rhyl 19–20 July; and Llandudno 12–17 August.

=== Awards ===
- National Eisteddfod of Wales (held in Llandudno)
- National Eisteddfod of Wales: Chair – withheld
- National Eisteddfod of Wales: Crown – Tom Parri Jones
- National Eisteddfod of Wales: Prose Medal – William Llywelyn Jones

=== New books ===
- Kenneth O. Morgan – David Lloyd George, Welsh Radical as World Statesman
- Bertrand Russell – Essays in Skepticism
- R. S. Thomas – The Bread of Truth
- Clough Williams-Ellis – Portmeirion, the Place and its Meaning

=== Music ===
- Arwel Hughes – Pantycelyn (oratorio)
- Daniel Jones – The Knife (opera)
- Grace Williams – Trumpet Concerto

== Film ==
- Richard Burton and Elizabeth Taylor star in Cleopatra.
- Desmond Llewelyn makes his first appearance as "Q" in the James Bond series of films.
- Rachel Roberts stars in This Sporting Life
- Jack Howells wins the Academy Award for Dylan Thomas at the 35th Academy Awards in the category of Best Documentary Short. As of 2011 it is the only Welsh film to have won an Oscar.

== Broadcasting ==
- The ITV franchise Wales (West and North) Television (WWN) (also called "Teledu Cymru") becomes the only company in Independent Television history to go bankrupt, and is taken over by TWW.

=== Welsh-language television ===
- Heno

=== English-language television ===
- 23 November – The first episode of BBC's new science fiction series Doctor Who, devised by Welshman Terry Nation, is broadcast.

== Sport ==
- BBC Wales Sports Personality of the Year – Howard Winstone

== Births ==
- 22 January – Huw Irranca-Davies, politician
- 27 April – Russell T Davies, television screenwriter
- 14 May – Andrew Lewis, composer
- 8 June – Louise Jones, cyclist
- 15 June – Nigel Walker, athlete and rugby player
- 28 June – Peter Baynham, comedian
- 10 July – Ian Lougher, motorcycle racer
- August – Rebecca Evans, operatic soprano
- 15 August (in Wolverhampton) – Simon Hart, politician, Secretary of State for Wales
- 12 September – Julie Roberts (artist), painter
- 19 October – Phil Davies, rugby union player
- 1 November – Mark Hughes, footballer and football manager
- 28 November – Charles Dale, television actor
- 7 December – Mark Bowen, footballer
- 16 December – Hugh Morris, cricketer
- 19 December – Paul Rhys, actor
- 28 December – Simon Thomas, politician

== Deaths ==
- 1 January – David Mort, Labour MP for Swansea East, 74
- 11 January – Philippa Powys, novelist, 76
- 13 March – Margaret Davies, philanthropist, 78
- 15 January – Morgan Phillips, politician, 60
- 15 March – William Cove, politician, 74
- 28 March – Alec Templeton, composer, pianist and satirist, 52
- 15 April – Edward V. Robertson, US senator, 81
- 25 May – William Lewis, chemist
- 17 June – John Cowper Powys, novelist, 90
- 29 July – Frank Moody, British boxing champion, 62
- 11 September – William Richard Williams, civil servant and politician, 68
- 26 September
  - Goronwy Owen, politician, 82
  - Olive Wheeler, educationalist, 77
- 1 October – Tal Harris, Wales international rugby player, 61
- 11 October – Emlyn Garner Evans, lawyer and politician, 53
- 26 October – Horace Evans, royal physician, 60
- 16 December – Llewellyn Evans, Olympic hockey player, 84
- 20 December – Reg Skrimshire, Wales and British Lions rugby union player, 85
- 26 December – Gwynn Parry Jones, singer, 72
- 30 December – Rees Williams, footballer, 63

== See also ==
- 1963 in Northern Ireland
