= Elvyn Bowen =

Welsh cricketer

Personal information
- Full name: Elvyn Bowen
- Born: 10 July 1907; Llannon, Carmarthenshire, Wales
- Died: 24 August 1965 (aged 58); Gorseinon, Glamorgan, Wales
- Batting: Left-handed
- Bowling: Slow left-arm orthodox

Domestic team information
- Years: Team
- 1928–1933: Glamorgan

Career statistics
Competition	FC
Matches	3
Runs scored	40
Batting average	10.00
100s/50s	–/–
Top score	22
Balls bowled	30
Wickets	–
Bowling average	–
5 wickets in innings	–
10 wickets in match	–
Best bowling	–
Catches/stumpings	–/–
- Source: Cricinfo, 30 June 2010

Elvyn Bowen (10 July 1907 – 24 August 1965) was a Welsh cricketer. Bowen was a left-handed batsman who bowled slow left-arm orthodox. He was born at Llannon, Carmarthenshire.

Bowen made his first-class debut for Glamorgan in 1928 against Lancashire. He played a further first-class match for the county, against Essex and played his third and final match for the county against Northamptonshire. In his 3 first-class matches he scored 40 runs at a batting average of 10.00, with a high score of 22.

Bowen died at Gorseinon, Glamorgan on 24 August 1965.
