= William Duff (dentist) =

William John Duff (born January 1962) is a Scottish dentist from Kilbarchan in Renfrewshire who was jailed for three years (reduced on appeal to two years) for fraud and reckless endangerment in 2001.()

Duff worked for a number of dental practices in West Central Scotland in the late 1980s and early 1990s. He was the recipient of a number of complaints (initially dismissed by authorities) about unnecessary dental work carried out on patients. It was later revealed in disciplinary and court proceedings that he also exposed his patients to infection from diseases such as HIV and Hepatitis C due to his deliberate failure to follow standard sterilisation and hygiene procedures.

The issues surrounding the case were initially raised in the UK Parliament by Maria Fyfe MP for the Maryhill Constituency in Glasgow in series of debates in the British House of Commons.()

Duff was sentenced to three years imprisonment in February 2001 after pleading guilty to one charge of fraud, and one charge of reckless endangerment (15 Months for the first charge and 21 months for the second charge to run consecutively).

In June 2001 Duff appealed his sentence to the High Courts of the Justiciary in Scotland, although rejecting all the arguments put forward by his defense they agreed on a legal technicality that his sentence should be reduced to two years. The appellant judges did not disagree or dispute the findings of the original sentence.().

In 2006 it was revealed that Duff was now working as a senior manager within the IT department of Inverclyde Council responsible for contract negotiation and implementation. He left this position suddenly in August 2007.
