= 1959 in Scotland =

- Centuries: 18th; 19th; 20th; 21st
- Decades: 1930s; 1940s; 1950s; 1960s; 1970s
- See also: List of years in Scotland; Timeline of Scottish history 1959 in: The UK • Wales • Elsewhere; Scottish football: 1958–59 • 1959–60; 1959 in Scottish television

Events from the year 1959 in Scotland.

== Incumbents ==
- Secretary of State for Scotland and Keeper of the Great Seal – John Maclay

=== Law officers ===
- Lord Advocate – William Rankine Milligan
- Solicitor General for Scotland – William Grant

=== Judiciary ===
- Lord President of the Court of Session and Lord Justice General – Lord Clyde
- Lord Justice Clerk – Lord Thomson
- Chairman of the Scottish Land Court – Lord Gibson

== Events ==
- 1 January – 5 members of the Universal Hiking Club of Glasgow die in a storm in the Grampians.
- 9 January – Clyde-built fisheries protection vessel Freya founders off Caithness with the loss of 3 of her crew of 20.
- 28 January – a Glasgow Corporation Tramways tramcar collides with a lorry and catches fire in Shettleston Road with 3 killed.
- 2 May – the Chapelcross nuclear power station opens.
- 4 July – British Railways close their Kilmarnock Works.
- 18 September – Auchengeich mining disaster: 47 miners die as the result of an underground fire at Auchengeich Colliery, Lanarkshire.
- 8 October – United Kingdom general election results in a record third successive Conservative victory. Harold Macmillan increases the Conservative majority to 100 seats across the UK but the Unionist Party in Scotland loses 4 seats.
- 14 November – the nuclear Dounreay fast reactor achieves criticality.
- 17 November – Prestwick and Renfrew Airports become the first in the U.K. with duty-free shops.
- 6 December – Aberdeen trawler George Robb runs aground at Duncansby Head in a severe gale with the loss of all 12 crew.
- 7 December – Leith coaster Servus runs aground below Dunbeath Castle; her crew are rescued by life-boat.
- 8 December – Broughty Ferry life-boat Mona capsizes on service to North Carr Lightship with the loss of all 8 of the life-boat crew.
- William Theodore Heard is elevated to cardinal, the first Scot to hold such an office since the Reformation.
- St. Cuthbert's Co-operative Society opens Scotland's first supermarket in Edinburgh.
- North of Scotland Hydro-Electric Board's Sloy-Awe Hydro-Electric Power Scheme becomes fully operational; and peat-fired generating station at Altnabreac opened.
- North Highland College established.
- The fossil ichthyosaur Dearcmhara is first discovered by Brian Shawcross on the Trotternish peninsula of Skye.

== Births ==
- 31 January – Heather Anderson, SNP politician
- 12 April – Jackson Carlaw, politician, leader of the Scottish Conservatives
- 16 April – Alison Ramsay, field hockey player
- 27 April – Sheena Easton, singer
- 27 May – Gerard Kelly, television and pantomime actor (died 2010 in London)
- 9 July – Jim Kerr, rock singer-songwriter
- 16 July – James MacMillan, composer
- 27 July – Siobhan Redmond, actress
- 28 July – Lorraine Fullbrook, Conservative politician
- 31 July – Andrew Marr, print and television journalist
- 29 August – Eddi Reader, folk singer-songwriter
- 7 September – Rona Munro, dramatist and screenwriter
- 8 September – Judy Murray, tennis player and coach
- 10 October – Mark Johnston, racehorse trainer
- 25 November – Charles Kennedy, politician, leader of the Liberal Democrats (UK) (died 2015)
- 30 November – Lorraine Kelly, television presenter
- date unknown
  - Meg Bateman, Gaelic writer and poet
  - Robert Crawford, poet and literary scholar
  - Andy Gray, actor (died 2021)
  - Pam Hogg, fashion designer (died 2025)
  - Alexander Stoddart, sculptor

== Deaths ==
- 2 July – William Weir, 1st Viscount Weir, industrialist and politician (born 1877)
- 1 October – Evelyn Vida Baxter, ornithologist (born 1879)
- 15 November – Charles Thomson Rees Wilson, physicist, Nobel Prize laureate (born 1869)
- 25 November – Robert Smyth McColl, footballer and retail store founder (born 1876)

== The arts ==
- Jane Duncan's first novel My Friends the Miss Boyds is published by Macmillan.

== See also ==
- 1959 in Northern Ireland
