= Charles Jones (rugby union, born 1893) =

Welsh rugby union footballer

- Born: Charles William Jones; 18 June 1893 Cardiff, Wales
- Died: 19 January 1960 (aged 66) Birkenhead, England

Rugby union career
- Position: Flanker
Senior career
Years	Team	Apps	(Points)
1922–1923	Leicester Tigers	29	(3)
International career
Years	Team	Apps	(Points)
1920	Wales	3	(0)

Charles William Jones (18 June 1893 - 19 January 1960) was a Welsh international rugby union player, between 1922 and 1923 he played 29 matches for Leicester Tigers.

== Career ==
Jones made his international debut for Wales on 17 January 1920 in the first game of the 1920 Five Nations Championship, Wales won 19–5. He played in further internationals against Scotland and France.

He made his Leicester Tigers debut on 16 December 1922 in a 16 all draw against Bristol at Welford Road. He was a regularly for the rest of the 1922/23 season featuring in 20 of the remain 28 games that season, including the historic game in Paris against Racing, the club's first overseas game. His final appearance for the club was in November 1923 against Llanelli.
