= Jillian Lane =

British psychic (1960–2013)

Jillian Lane (9 May 1960 – 9 October 2013) was a British psychic best known for having Michael Jackson as her client. She described herself as "an international medium, clairvoyant, spiritual consultant and healer".

== Early life ==
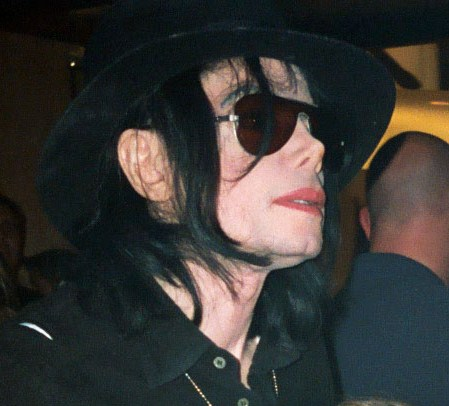
Michael Jackson, a client of Lane's, pictured in 2003

Jillian Lane was born 9 May 1960, in Splott, Wales to Maureen and Brynly Lane; her father was a Vale of Glamorgan councillor. She was baptised and raised Catholic. As a child, she aspired to be a hairdresser. At age seven, Lane reportedly experienced an out-of-body experience.

== Career ==
As she matured, Lane turned to spiritualism, after feeling that she had "different gifts". Influenced by her grandmother, who was considered to be a psychic, Lane set out to become a medium and became the disciple of Welsh writer and psychic George Smith.

In 1997, during a trip to London, Michael Jackson telephoned a psychic hotline that Lane answered. They soon struck a friendship and Jackson began to confide in her. Lane flew from Britain to the United States to aid Jackson in person, and eventually relocated to Los Angeles. Up until Jackson's death in June 2009, the psychic and the singer met secretly to avoid media attention. They usually met at Jackson's Beverly Hills mansion. Lane claimed Jackson never paid her for her services in cash, reportedly presenting her with gifts of jewellery and flowers. After Jackson's death, Lane claimed she could still sense his presence.

== Final years and death ==
Lane, who had diabetes, was diagnosed with "non-alcoholic liver disease" in 2012. In 2013, she told her acquaintances that her death was impending. Her illness took a turn for the worse and in September 2013, she was admitted to a hospital in Los Angeles, where she spent six weeks. Homesick, she asked to be sent to a British hospital. On 9 October 2013, Lane died, aged 53, at the University Hospital of Wales.

Lane's funeral was held at Saint Helen's Catholic Church in Barry on 17 October 2013.
