= Evan Edwards =

Welsh footballer (1898-1958)

Personal information
- Full name: Evan Jenkin Edwards
- Date of birth: 14 December 1898
- Place of birth: Bedlinog, Wales
- Date of death: 1958 (aged 59–60)
- Height: 5 ft 8 in (1.73 m)
- Position: Outside left

Senior career*
Years	Team	Apps	(Gls)
19??–1923	Merthyr Town (Note: Merthyr Town figures are for appearances in the Football League only, not those in the 1919–20 Southern Football League season.)	80	(10)
1923–1925	Wolverhampton Wanderers	63	(12)
1925	Mid-Rhondda United		
1925–1926	Swansea Town	11	(1)
1926–1927	Northampton Town	11	(2)
1927–192?	Halifax Town	0	(0)
–	Ebbw Vale		
1928–1929	Darlington	25	(3)
1929–1930	Clapton Orient	4	(0)
- * Club domestic league appearances and goals

Evan Jenkin Edwards (14 December 1898 – 1958) was a Welsh footballer who scored 28 goals from 194 appearances in the Football League playing at outside left for Merthyr Town, Wolverhampton Wanderers, Swansea Town, Northampton Town, Darlington and Clapton Orient in the 1920s. He was on the books of Halifax Town without representing them in the League, and also played for Southern League clubs Mid-Rhondda United and Ebbw Vale.

Edwards played for Wales in an amateur international match against England Amateurs in 1920. According to the Daily Express report, "E.J. Edwards, the Merthyr outside left, was the star artist of the Welsh attack, and his elusive runs and centres were a feature of the first half, but following change of ends he was kept well under control"; his team lost 9–0.
