= Guildhaume Myrddin-Evans =

Welsh civil servant (1894–1964)

Sir Guildhaume Myrddin-Evans CB KCMG
- Portrait by Walter Stoneman, 1949
- Born: 17 December 1894; Abertillery, Wales
- Died: 15 February 1964 (aged 69); Regent's Park, London, England
- Education: Llandovery College
- Alma mater: Christ Church, Oxford
- Occupation: Civil servant
- Spouse: Elizabeth Watkins (m. 1919)
- Children: 2

Sir Guildhaume Myrddin-Evans CB KCMG (17 December 1894 – 15 February 1964) was a Welsh senior civil servant and labour expert.

== Early life ==
Guildhaume Myrddin-Evans was the son of the Rev. Thomas Towy Evans, and his wife Mary (née James). He attended Cwmtillery Elementary School, Abertillery County School, Llandovery College and Christ Church, Oxford, where he received a first class honours degree in mathematics.

== Family ==
In 1919 he married Elizabeth, daughter of Owen Watkins, Sarn, Caernarfonshire. They had two sons. Myrddin-Evans was a member of the Council of the Baptist Union of Great Britain and Ireland from 1943 and served as secretary of the Baptist Chapel in Bloomsbury, London.

== Career ==
He joined the South Wales Borderers on the outbreak of the First World War and served as a lieutenant in France and Flanders. In 1917 he was badly injured and joined David Lloyd George's personal secretariat before being appointed as assistant secretary to the War Cabinet in 1919. He worked at the Treasury between 1920 and 1929 before moving to the Ministry of Labour where he became deputy chief insurance officer in 1935. He attended the Hague Conferences on Reparations in 1929 and 1930. In 1938, he was appointed head of the International Labour Division of the Ministry of Labour.

In 1941 he was appointed as head of the Production Executive Secretariat in the Cabinet Office and in 1942 served as a labour consultant to the governments of Canada and the United States.

In 1942 he returned to the Ministry of Labour and National Service as under-secretary before being promoted to deputy secretary in 1945. In this role he was the UK Government's representative to the International Labour Organisation until 1959 and was its chair three times. Between 1955 and 1959 he was the Chief International Labour Adviser to the UK Government.

On his retirement in 1959 he was appointed to chair the Local Government Commission for Wales. The commission issued its report in 1963.

Myrddin-Evans was awarded the CB in the 1945 honours list and the KCMG in the 1947 honours list.

His archive was donated to the National Library of Wales in 2019.

== Publications ==
- Myrddin-Evans was the co-author of The Employment Exchange Service of Great Britain (1934).
