= Edgar Phillips =

Welsh poet

Edgar Phillips (8 October 1889 – 30 August 1962), known by the bardic name "Trefin", was a Welsh poet and served as Archdruid of the National Eisteddfod of Wales from 1960 until his death.

Phillips took his bardic name from his birthplace, the village of Trefin in Pembrokeshire. He did not learn Welsh until his family moved to Cardiff when he was aged eleven. Whilst working as an apprentice tailor back in his native county, he mastered the art of cynghanedd. After running his own tailoring business in Cardiff, he joined the Royal Garrison Artillery during World War I, and was seriously wounded. In 1921, he took a teaching course at Caerleon, and taught at Pengam and Pontllanfraith. In 1933, he won the chair at the National Eisteddfod held in Wrexham.

His third wife, whom he married in 1951, was the travel writer Maxwell Fraser (real name Dorothy Phillips).

A memorial was erected within the chapel grounds of Rehoboth chapel.

== Works ==
- Trysor o gân, in four volumes (1930–36)
- Caniadau Trefîn (1950)
- Edmund Jones, the Old Prophet (1959)

== Sources ==
- Welsh Biography Online

Preceded by William Morris	Archdruid of the National Eisteddfod of Wales; 1960-1962	Succeeded by Albert Evans-Jones
