= Gallay =

Gallay is a surname. Notable people with the surname include:

- Alan Gallay, American historian
- Ana Gallay (born 1986), Argentine beach volleyball player
- Bernard Gallay (born 1959), Franco-Swiss yachtsman and businessman
- Claudie Gallay (born 1961), French author
- Jacques-François Gallay (1795–1864), French horn player
- Mark Gallay (1914–1998), Soviet test pilot
- Maurice Gallay (1902–1982), French footballer
- Olivia Gallay Bertrand (born 1989), French skier
