= 1959 in Scottish television =

This is a list of events in Scottish television from 1959.

== Events ==
- 8 October – Scottish Television presents the first Scottish coverage of the General Election.

== Television series ==
- Scotsport (1957–2008)
- The White Heather Club (1958–1968)

== Births ==
- 12 January – Nick Nairn, celebrity chef
- 18 March – Janice Hally, playwright and screenwriter
- 27 August – Siobhan Redmond, actress
- September – Gillian McKeith, nutritionist and television presenter
- 7 September – Rona Munro, writer
- 30 November – Lorraine Kelly, television presenter

== See also ==
- 1959 in Scotland
