= Landudal =

Landudal Landudal
- Commune
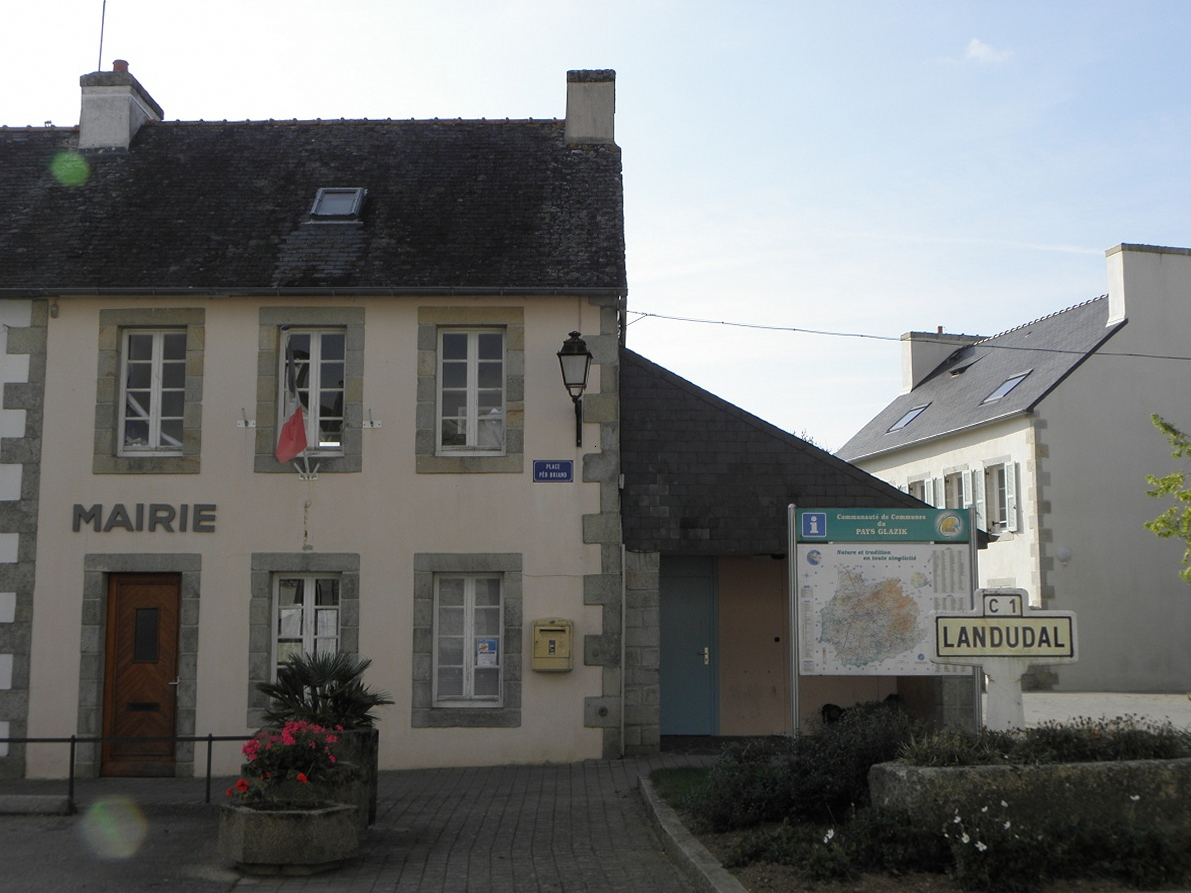
- The town hall in Landudal
- Location of Landudal
- Location within France Location within Brittany
- Coordinates: 48°03′47″N 3°58′34″W
- Country: France
- Region: Brittany
- Department: Finistère
- Arrondissement: Quimper
- Canton: Briec
- Intercommunality: Quimper Bretagne Occidentale

Government
  - Mayor (2020–2026): Raymond Messager
- Area^{1}: 16.69 km^{2} (6.44 sq mi)
- Highest elevation: 165 m (541 ft)
- Lowest elevation: 62 m (203 ft)
- Population (2023): 930
  - Density: 56/km^{2} (140/sq mi)
- Time zone: UTC+01:00 (CET)
  - Summer (DST): UTC+02:00 (CEST)
- INSEE/Postal code: 29107 /29510
- ^{1} French Land Register data, which excludes lakes, ponds, glaciers > 1 km^{2} (0.386 sq mi or 247 acres) and river estuaries.

Landudal (French pronunciation: [lɑ̃dydal]; Breton: Landudal) is a commune in the Finistère department of Brittany in north-western France. The writer Angèle Jacq, winner of the Cezam Prix Littéraire Inter CE in 2000 for her novel Le voyage de Jabel, was born in Landudal, as was the famed explorer Yves-Joseph de Kerguelen-Trémarec.

== Population ==
Inhabitants of Landudal are called in French Landudalais.

== See also ==
- Communes of the Finistère department
