= Éliette Abécassis =

French writer of Moroccan-Jewish descent (born 1969)

Éliette Abecassis
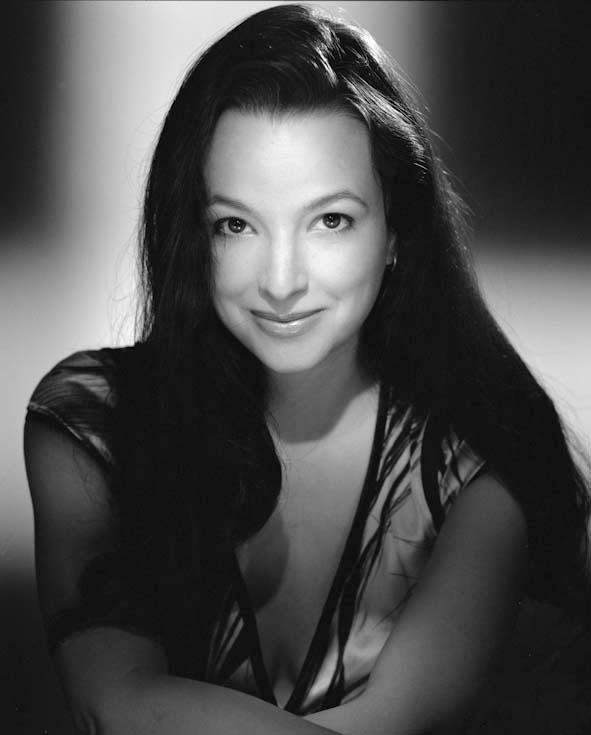
- Éliette Abecassis in 2006
- Born: 27 January 1969 (age 57); Strasbourg, France
- Education: École Normale Supérieure; Lycée Henri-IV
- Occupations: Professor, writer
- Writing career
- Language: French
- Period: 1996–present
- Genres: philosophy, history, mystery
- Website: eliette-abecassis.com

Éliette Abécassis (born 27 January 1969) is a French writer of Moroccan-Jewish descent. She is a professor of philosophy at the University of Caen Normandy.

== Biography ==
Éliette Abécassis was born in Strasbourg, France into a practicing Moroccan Jewish family. Her childhood was permeated by the daily life of the Strasbourg Jewish community. Her father, Armand Abécassis teaches philosophy and is a renowned thinker of Judaism whose thought permeated the Talmudic interpretation of Strasbourg. He notably played a considerable role in the creation and teaching of the Aquiba school in Strasbourg. Her mother, Janine, is a professor and specialist in child and developmental psychology. In several autobiographical novels, Éliette Abécassis declares to have been very influenced by the Sephardic religious environment and education, but to have also sometimes been suffocated by it and tried to emancipate itself from it on numerous occasions, especially during her youth. She declares her attachment to French universalism.

After the baccalaureate, she left Strasbourg at 17 to go to Paris to study in preparatory literary classes, at the Lycée Henri-IV. She then joined the École normale supérieure in rue d'Ulm, where she obtained the agrégation in philosophy, and then taught philosophy at the University of Caen. "I wasn't much older than my students. They were very good, all passionate about philosophy, which, however, does not lead to anything other than itself."

At 23, she went to the United States for a year at Harvard University, in the city of Cambridge, Massachusetts, on a scholarship. She then wrote her first novel, Qumran, a metaphysical detective story that deals with mysterious murders linked to the disappearance of the recently discovered Dead Sea scrolls.

For her first novel Qumran, Éliette Abécassis was not satisfied with her prior knowledge of the Hebrew world. She went to the United States in several libraries, archives and places of contemporary Jewish culture in order to obtain as much information as possible. Her research lasted three years and it paid off: Qumran was released in 1996 and immediately achieved immense success; the book being translated into eighteen languages. The main publishing houses had however refused the manuscript, until Ramsay editions accepted it.

In 1997, she began to teach philosophy in Caen and published L'Or et la Cendre, the mysterious story of the murder of a Berlin theologian, still with Ramsay editions. In 1998, she wrote an essay on Evil and the philosophical origin of homicide: Little Metaphysics of Murder at the Presses Universitaires de France.

In September 2000, she published with Albin Michel La Répudiée. For this novel she received the Prize of Believing Writers 2001. This novel was inspired by the screenplay she wrote for the film Kadosh by Israeli director Amos Gitai. In 2001, Le Trésor du temple recounts Qumran's follow in the footsteps of the Templars: Ary Cohen and Jane Rogers meet to investigate the secret of the Jerusalem temple. Qumran's trilogy borrows the form of the adventure and suspense novel but conceals in the plots a real erudition and a real metaphysical ambition. The same year, she directed the short film La Nuit de noces, the screenplay of which was co-written with Gérard Brach.

In 2002, her novel Mon père is published, which tells of the questioning of an idyllic father-daughter relationship, while Qumran is adapted into a comic book by Gémine and Makyo. In 2003, her novel Clandestin tells the story of an impossible love. It is part of the selection of twelve books for the Prix Goncourt.

In 2004, the last part of Qumran, The Last Tribe, appeared. In 2005, with her novel Un heureux événement, Éliette Abécassis tackles the theme of motherhood. She also directed the documentary-fiction, Tel Aviv la vie with Tiffany Tavernier.

In 2009, she published the novel Sépharade, whose heroine in her existential quest immersed herself in the world of the Sephardic Jews of Morocco. In 2011, she published Et te voici permise à tout homme where she talks about the difficulties of obtaining a religious divorce.

In 2013, she publishes Le Palimpseste d'Archimède.

In 2014, she published Un secret du docteur Freud, written with the help of her mother, a psychoanalyst. In 2015, Alyah appeared, a sort of testimony from a Jewish woman after the January 2015 Île-de-France attacks. Le maître du Talmud, published in 2018, is a new historical-religious thriller, the plot of which is set in the kingdom of France in the thirteenth century, marked by the emergence of the Inquisition and religious fanaticism.

Éliette Abécassis is divorced and the mother of two children.

=== Women's rights activism ===
Eliette Abécassis is involved in associations fighting for the rights and freedoms of women, including the association SOS les Mamans. Alongside the lawyer Marie-Anne Frison-Roche and the philosopher Sylviane Agacinski, she campaigned vigorously against surrogacy, which she likened to a practice of commodification of the body of women and reification of the child.

== Works ==
=== Books ===
- Qumran (1996)
- L'Or et la cendre (1997)
- Petite Métaphysique du meurtre (1998)
- La Répudiée (2000)
- Le Trésor du temple (2001)
- Mon père (2002)
- Sacred (2002)
- Clandestin (2003)
- La Dernière Tribu (2004)
- Un heureux événement (2005)
- Le Corset invisible (2007)
- Mère et fille, un roman (2008)
- Sépharade (2009)
- Le Messager (2009) (with Mark Crick)
- Et te voici permise à tout homme (2011)
- Le palimpseste d'archimède (2013)
- Un secret du docteur Freud (2014)
- Alyah (2015)
- Le Maître du Talmud (2018)
- L'Envie d'y croire: journal d'une époque sans foi (2019)
- Nos rendez-vous (2020)
- Instagrammable (2021)
- Transmission (2022)
- If Only (2023)

=== Participations ===
- Lettres à Dieu, Calmann-Lévy (2004)
- La Rencontre, collection of short stories, Éditions Prisma, (2010). Alongside Marek Halter, Camilla Läckberg, Didier van Cauwelaert, Claudie Gallay and Agnès Desarthe.
- Enfances, adolescences, Librio (2015).

=== Books on feminism ===
Éliette Abécassis has written books and articles on the status of women, which she defends in several associations, such as Le Corset invisible in 2007, with Caroline Bongrand.

"The corset, with the advent of feminism, has disappeared from our wardrobes. Today our belly and our movements are free, and we can breathe. But our body and our mind are locked, compressed, atrophied in a corset more insidious than that of previous centuries, because it cannot be seen. [...] Today's female body is actually controlled by task exhaustion, diets and new beauty standards. Her mind, supposedly free from male domination, is in the grip of society as a whole, which seems to be conspiring against her."

In 2018, she published Bébés à vendre at Robert Laffont, a review of surrogacy, in which she denounced the commodification of women's bodies.

=== Children's literature ===
Éliette Abécassis has also published a series of children's books: T'es plus ma maman, Je ne veux pas dormir, Il a tout et moi j'ai rien, Astalik fait ses courses et Je ne veux pas aller à l'école.

She, with her daughter, told and sang a children's story, Lulu veut être chanteuse (Lulu wants to be a singer) published in a digital book on the Whisperies platform.

== Filmography ==
=== Directed ===
- 2001: La nuit de noce, twelve minutes short film with Samuel Le Bihan and Isild Le Besco.
- 2007: Tel Aviv la vie, directed with Tiffany Tavernier.

=== Scriptwriter ===
- 1999 : Kadosh, by Amos Gitaï.

=== Cinematographic adaptation of her work ===
- 2011 : Un heureux événement, by Rémi Bezançon.

== Music ==
Éliette Abécassis is a lyricist, notably for the French rock group Debout sur le zinc. She also wrote the song La chanson Sépharade for Enrico Macias.

== Titles ==
2001: Prix Écritures & Spiritualités for the novel La Répudiée (2000).

2010: Alberto Benveniste Prize for the novel Sépharade (2010).
