= Ann Marie Di Mambro =

Scottish playwright (born 1950)

Ann Marie di Mambro
- Born: 18 June 1950 (age 76); Glasgow, Scotland
- Occupations: Playwright, screenwriter
- Writing career
- Period: 1985 – present
- Genres: Television drama, theatre
- Notable works: Machair, Tally's Blood
- Notable awards: The Susan Smith Blackburn Prize 1994-5

Ann Marie Di Mambro (born 18 June 1950) is a Scottish playwright and television screenwriter of Italian extraction. Her theatre plays have been performed widely; they are also published individually and in collections and are studied in schools for the Scottish curriculum's Higher Drama and English.

== Biography ==
Di Mambro studied at Glasgow University, Girton College, Cambridge, and Bolton College of Education, before becoming a teacher. She gave up teaching to write for theatre. Her plays have been performed in Scotland's main theatres as well as touring to other venues across Scotland. From 1989 to 1990, she was the Thames Television Resident Playwright at the Traverse Theatre in Edinburgh. She has been commissioned to write plays by the Traverse Theatre and by Cumbernauld Theatre. She won the Susan Smith Blackburn Prize for 1994-5.

In addition to theatre plays, she writes drama for British radio and British television. These included multiple episodes of the BBC's popular continuing dramas: Doctors, River City, EastEnders and Casualty.

=== Machair ===
Di Mambro was also screenwriter on the first ever long-running Gaelic drama television serial Machair created by Peter May and Janice Hally. Along with Hally, Di Mambro wrote scripts in English before they were translated into Gaelic. Fewer than 2% of the Scottish population are able to speak Gaelic but the show achieved a 30% audience share, making it into the Top Ten of programmes viewed in Scotland. Machair was nominated for production and writing awards at The Celtic Film Festival and by Writers Guild of Great Britain

== Theatre plays ==
- Hocus Pocus (1986) Annexe Theatre Company, Glasgow
- Joe (1987) Traverse Theatre, Edinburgh
- Dixon's Has Blasted (1987) Mayfest, Glasgow
- Sheila (1988) Traverse Theatre, Edinburgh
- Visible Differences (1988) TAG, Theatre About Glasgow
- Long Story Short (1989) 7:84 Theatre Company (touring company), Scotland
- The Letter Box (1989) Sabhal Mòr Ostaig, Isle of Skye
- Tally's Blood (1990) Traverse Theatre, Edinburgh
- Scotland Matters (1992) 7:84 Theatre Company (touring company), Scotland
- Brothers of Thunder (1998) published in "Scotland Plays" Nick Hern Books, London, 1998
- Ae Fond Kiss (2007) Assembly Rooms, Edinburgh

== Filmography ==
- Dramarama (1987-1988)
- Winners and Losers (1989)
- Take the High Road (1988 - 1995, also script editor)
- Doctor Finlay (1993-1996)
- Pie in the Sky (1997)
- Hope and Glory (Series 2, episode 2) (2000)
- Taggart (2002)
- The Inspector Lynley Mysteries (2004)
- Casualty (1995-2007)
- EastEnders (2003-2011)
- Doctors (2014)
- Eve (2015)
- The Coroner (2015-2016)
- River City (2007-2011, 2022)
