= Seyhan Kurt =

French-Turkish sociologist

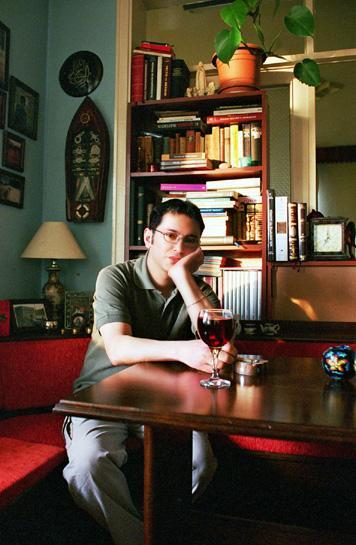
- Born: December 16, 1971 (age 54); Grenoble, France
- Education: Ankara University
- Occupations: poet, writer
- Writing career
- Genres: contemporary poetry, anthropology, sociology
- Movements: Humanism, Mysticism, Symbolism, existentialism, Futurism

Seyhan Kurt (born December 16, 1971) is a French-Turkish poet, writer, anthropologist and sociologist.

== Biography ==
Kurt was born in the commune of Bourgoin-Jallieu in Grenoble, France. He studied at the École de Jean Jaurès in Lyon. He studied painting in France and dramaturgy and art history in İzmir.

In 1992 and 1993, he exhibited his paintings in abstract style and oil painting technique in two solo exhibitions at Mersin State Fine Arts Gallery. He studied French Language and Literature, Sociology and Anthropology. He conducted research on architecture and urban culture in Italy and Greece. He received his master's degree from Ankara University, Faculty of Language, History and Geography, Department of Anthropology. In 2020, he edited Falih Rıfkı Atay's Coast of Taymis (1934), a political, sociological and anthropological analysis of his observations during his travels in England and Europe. He worked on Jean Baudrillard's simulation theory and consumer society. He wrote articles on cinema, architecture, immigration and modern art.

== From Household to Home State ==
In his 2021 book From Household to Home State, published by İletişim Publication, he emphasized the importance of not only architecture, but also disciplines such as anthropology and sociology that examine daily practices, regulations and consumption phenomena when dealing with the concept of "Turkish house". In his study, he adopted an interdisciplinary method by utilizing different fields from Turkish cinema to oral culture:

" Seyhan Kurt’s book From Household to Home State traces the image of the “Turkish house,” which dates from the 19th century to the present day, historically, anthropologically, sociologically, architecturally, and economically. According to Kurt, this image has a direct relationship to collective memory. Therefore, the “Turkish house” has a meaning that refers to daily life here, as well as to architecture. The resources utilized by Kurt, who focuses on daily life as the center of his work, cover a wide range of topics, from art history to literature, anthropology to architecture, cinema to ancient Greek and Roman history."

The book consists of three main parts. chapter one: “Traditional Life: Architecture, History and Everyday Practices". Part two: "Houses Today, Regulation and Consumption". Third part: "Urban Life, Street, Neighborhood and Balcony":

"However, before these chapters the author investigates the concepts of “while” and “time” by giving examples from Anatolian life, Turkish literature, thought, and cinema under the title of “In Respect of While, Time and Urban Space.” According to him, these basic concepts are some of the most important arguments in comprehending the historical, social and economic processes that a society goes through. In Istanbul and eventually in Anatolia, clock interiors of the household type and clock towers in the town square since the end of the 19th century have transformed the world of thought and individual-city relations. How this process occurred, including encountered problems, is explained comprehensively by using the texts of significant writers and thinkers, such as Ahmet Hamdi Tanpınar, Ahmet Haşim, Norbert Elias, Jacques Ranciere, Orhan Pamuk, Georg Simmel, Theodor Adorno and Richard Sennett."

the author begins with objects to describe the transformation of the Turkish house. Wall clocks, showcases, curtains, lace, microwave ovens, American kitchens, furniture on one side; Cedar, courtyard, tandoor, hearth, gizzard, closet, gushane, doors, knockers, "who came windows" on the other side. Seyhan Kurt's book, which we can call an anthropological study rather than architecture, examines this concept of Turkish House. But starting from the perception of time, he looks at the use of space, the placement of things and daily life. According to art historian Professor Jale N. Erzen, an important emphasis of the book, which examines the most general and special, individual and social elements of life in all details, is the handling of body/space/object relations in terms of architectural quality. Interviews with Seyhan Kurt about the book were published in Mediascope TV, Artfulliving, Bisavblog and Hürriyet newspaper.

Between 1990 and 2017, some of his poems were translated into French, English, German, Greek and Estonian.

== Bibliography in Turkish ==
- (1993) Kapa Gözlerini "Shut Your Eyes"
- (1995) Destinos "destiny"
- (1999) Hüznün Sözyitimleri "Speechlessness of Sadness"
- (2002) On Jean Baudrillard (unpublished thesis)
- (2002) El Ilani "Hand-Out"
- (2004) Bizden Geçen Sular "Waters Running Through Us"
- (2012) Seyyah "The Voyager"
- (2017) Herkese ve Hiç Kimseye "To Everyone and No one"
- (2021) Haneden Ev Haline:"Türk Evi”nde Mimari, Düzenleme, Pratik From Household to Home State: Architecture, Arrangement and Practice in "Turkish House" "

== References in English ==
- "I felt like a 'prisoner of language', Interview with Seyhan Kurt/ Mehmet Tekin", (Translation by Beyza Şen), The Review of Life Studies, Volume 15 (March 2024): 1–19, College of Humanities and Social Science, Osaka Prefecture University, Osaka - Japan.
- The House: Beyond Residing, On the Book by Seyhan Kurt From Household to Home State: Architecture, Arrangement and Practice in "Turkish House", Ahmet Testici, "The Review of Life Studies", Tokyo, 2022.
- Alienation of The Individual Due To His Conflict With Modernity: Seyhan Kurt's "Speechlessness", Faculty of Sciences and Humanities, English Language and Literature - Konya, 2002, by Emre Dagli, Ass. Prof. Dr. Gülbün Onur.

== References in Turkish ==
- "We no longer need the idea that our homes should be a space of representation where we can share our individuality", An Interview with Seyhan Kurt on Home, Shelter and Sedentariness, Latif Yılmaz, Birikim Magazine, November 19, 2023.
- On The Book of Seyhan Kurt: From Household to Home State: Architecture, Arrangement and Practice in "Turkish House", Hanife Sümeyye Taşdelen, Human & Society, 2022.
- Interview with Seyhan Kurt on From Household to Our Situations of Home: Architecture, Arrangement, Practice in "Turkish House, Işın Eliçin, Mediascope, March, 2021
- Interview with Seyhan Kurt on The Ethic of The Modern World, Dr. Ahmet Gogercin, Kurgu Review 10, Ankara, 2012.
- "Seyhan Kurt: Poete Maudit, An Essay on 'Waters Running Through Us'"- Hüseyin PALA, Ayraç Review 15, Istanbul,2011.
- "Hand-Out", Yasemin Şen, Sabah Journal, November 10, Istanbul, 2005.
- Turkish Language Journal, September 24, 2007, Feyza Hepcilingirler, Cumhuriyet News, October 11, Istanbul, 2007.
- "Interview With Seyhan Kurt", Prof. Mehmet Tekin, Ayraç Review 19, İstanbul, 2011.
- "The Artistic Delirium and The Poetics of Possibility", Polat Alpman, Sosyologos Review 6, Konya, 2004.
- "Houses Transformed From Household To "Home" To Between Four Walls", Kerem Gürel, Gazete Pencere, April 25, 2021.
- "From The Cedar To The L.Seat, From The Tandoor To The Microwave Oven, From The Courtyard To The Balcony: Our Changing Home Life", Yağız Gönüler, Ruhuna Kitap, March, 2021.
