= Marcelle Pardé =

Professor and French Resistance person of interest

Marcelle Berthe Pardé (1891–1945) was a French resistance fighter and officer. She received the Legion of Honour, the Croix de Guerre 1939–1945, bronze palm and the Médaille de la Résistance française after her death at the Ravensbrück concentration camp.

== Early life ==
Pardé was born in Bourgoin-Jallieu, France on February 14, 1891.

== Biography ==
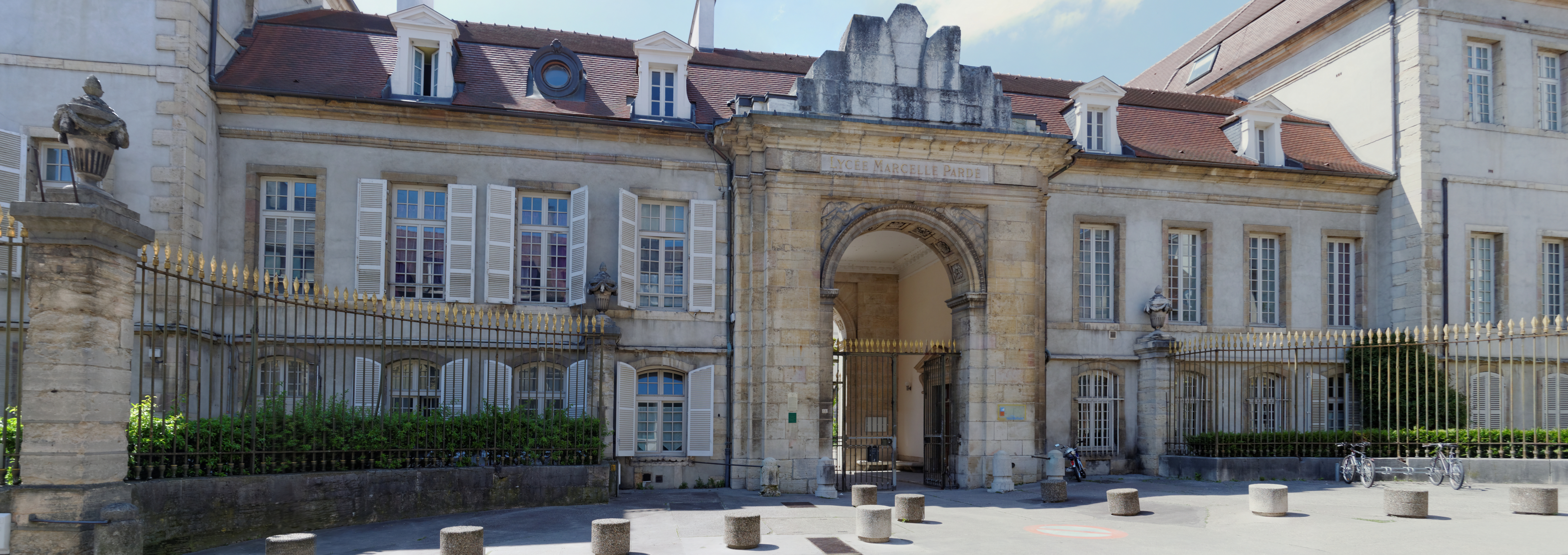
Marcelle-Pardé College in Dijon

Marcelle Pardé graduated from the École Normale Supérieure de Sèvres in 1914, in the middle of the war. Putting herself at the service of military hospitals in the École de Sèvres itself, then in Brittany, she finally found herself near her family in Chaumont where she was appointed to the boys' high school. She then spent her spare time acting as a nurse at the local military hospital. The headquarters of the American Expeditionary Force having moved to Chaumont in 1917, the family home accommodated two officers of General Pershing's General Staff.

In 1919, she accepted a position teaching French at Bryn Mawr College in Pennsylvania, where she taught until 1929. She returned to France to be closer to her mother whose health was declining, she obtained the Albert Kahn scholarship in 1930 to carry out an investigation into the state of French schools throughout the Middle East. This mission took her to Spain, Egypt, Palestine, Libanon, Syria and Persia. She reached Baghdad and traveled through Persia by car from the Caspian Sea to the Indian Ocean. On her return, a serious bout of malaria kept her in Aleppo for several weeks. She returned to France via Asia Minor (Türkiye), Constantinople, Yugoslavia and Austria. After a period of convalescence, she became director of the Edgar-Quinet girls' high school in Bourg-en-Bresse in 1932 then director of the girls' high school in Dijon in 1935. The war having been declared in 1939, her friends from Bryn Mawr, worried, quickly offered her a job in the United States, but she refused to leave her homeland in danger. The French government entrusted her with a delicate intelligence and French propaganda mission in Turkey in 1939.

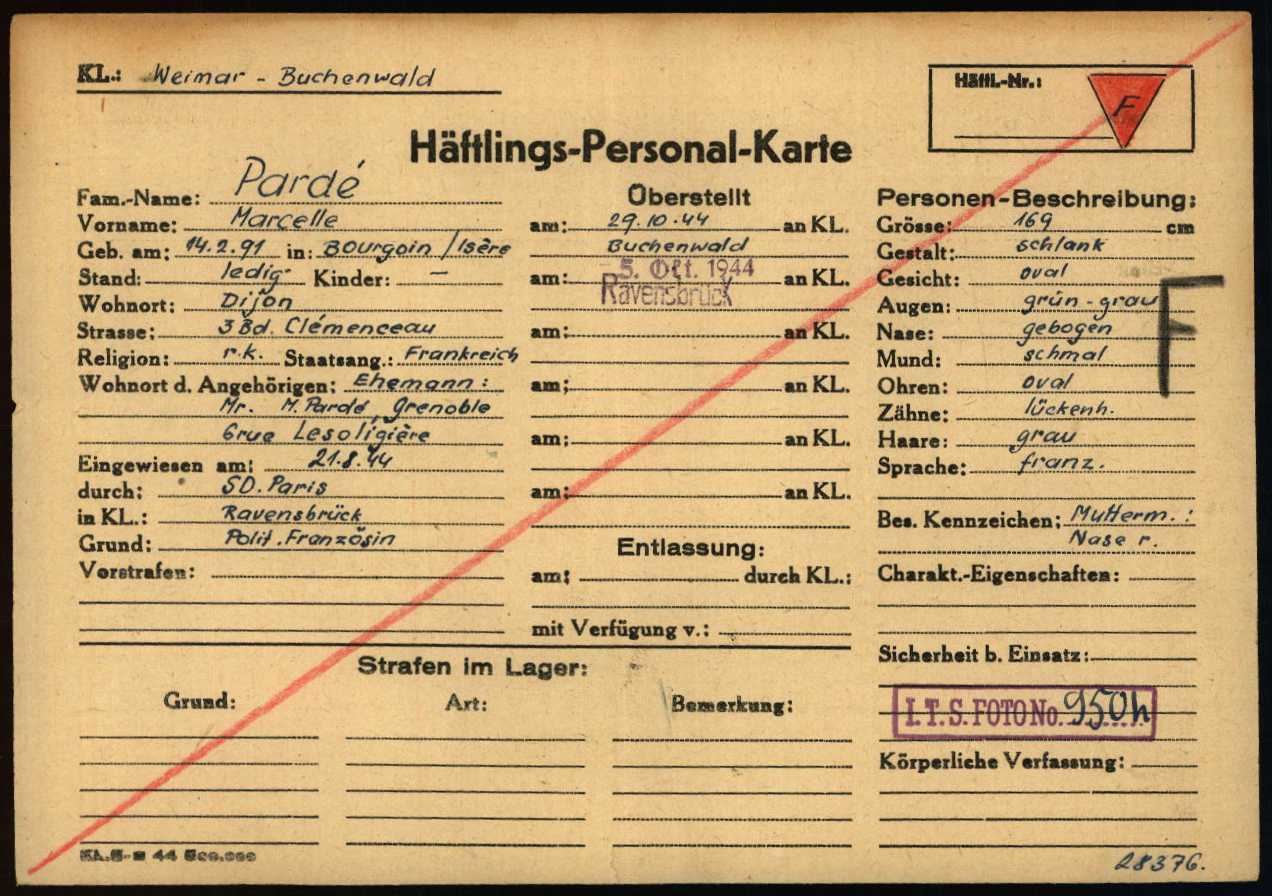
Marcelle Pardé's registration card in Buchenwald then Ravensbrück.

Shortly after returning from her mission in March 1940, she sought to make herself useful to France and, after June, to the Resistance. She enlisted in the French Fighting Forces in direct liaison with London in July 1942. From May 1943, she was a lieutenant within the Brutus network, coordinating the collection of military intelligence and coordinating with other resistant units. Following arrests made in Paris in July 1944, she was arrested on August 3, 1944 with her secretary Simone Plessis. They were deported with her to Ravensbrück on August 15, 1944. Pardé died of exhaustion, famine and illness in January 1945. During the few months she had at Ravensbrück, she provided spiritual support at the camp, preventing her prisoner sisters from sinking into complete bestial brutality, giving them various and cultivated talks, imbued with serenity, which gave them the desire to be reborn.

In December 2025, Denis Couillard de Lespinay, a grand-nephew of Marcelle Pardé living in Canada, published her first full biography at À LA UNE, editor in Chaumont, the product of 10 years of research in public and private archives. Sixty-seven collaborators in eight countries helped to sift through 76 archival collections and conduct or locate numerous interviews with important witnesses. The 224-page publication includes 200 illustrations, 550 footnotes, a bibliography, and an index.

== Honors and awards ==
- Chevalier de la Légion d'honneur (1946)
- Croix de Guerre 1939–1945, bronze palm (1946)
- Médaille de la Résistance française (decree of October 15, 1945)
- In 1945 Bryn Mawr College established the "Marcelle Pardé" scholarship.
- The high school she ran in Dijon took her name at the end of the war, before it became a college in 1967. The vocational high school that grew out of her high school in Bourg-en-Bresse also bears her name.
- In 2002, Marcelle Pardé was also granted the title of "Guardian of Life" by the French Association for Tribute to the Righteous in recognition of her determined action to safeguard her Jewish students during her years of resistance to the occupation.

== Personal life ==
Her brother, Maurice Pardé, was a geographer known for his work on potamology and her sister, Isabelle Pardé (1900–1993), was a painter. Among her nephews, Émile Pardé (son of Maurice) joined the maquis of Oisans where he was killed on August 13, 1944, during the attack on Lake Poursollet. Her great nephew Philippe Couillard was the Prime Minister of Québec from 2014 to 2018.
