= Derek Murray (sports presenter) =

Scottish television and radio presenter

- Derek Moireach
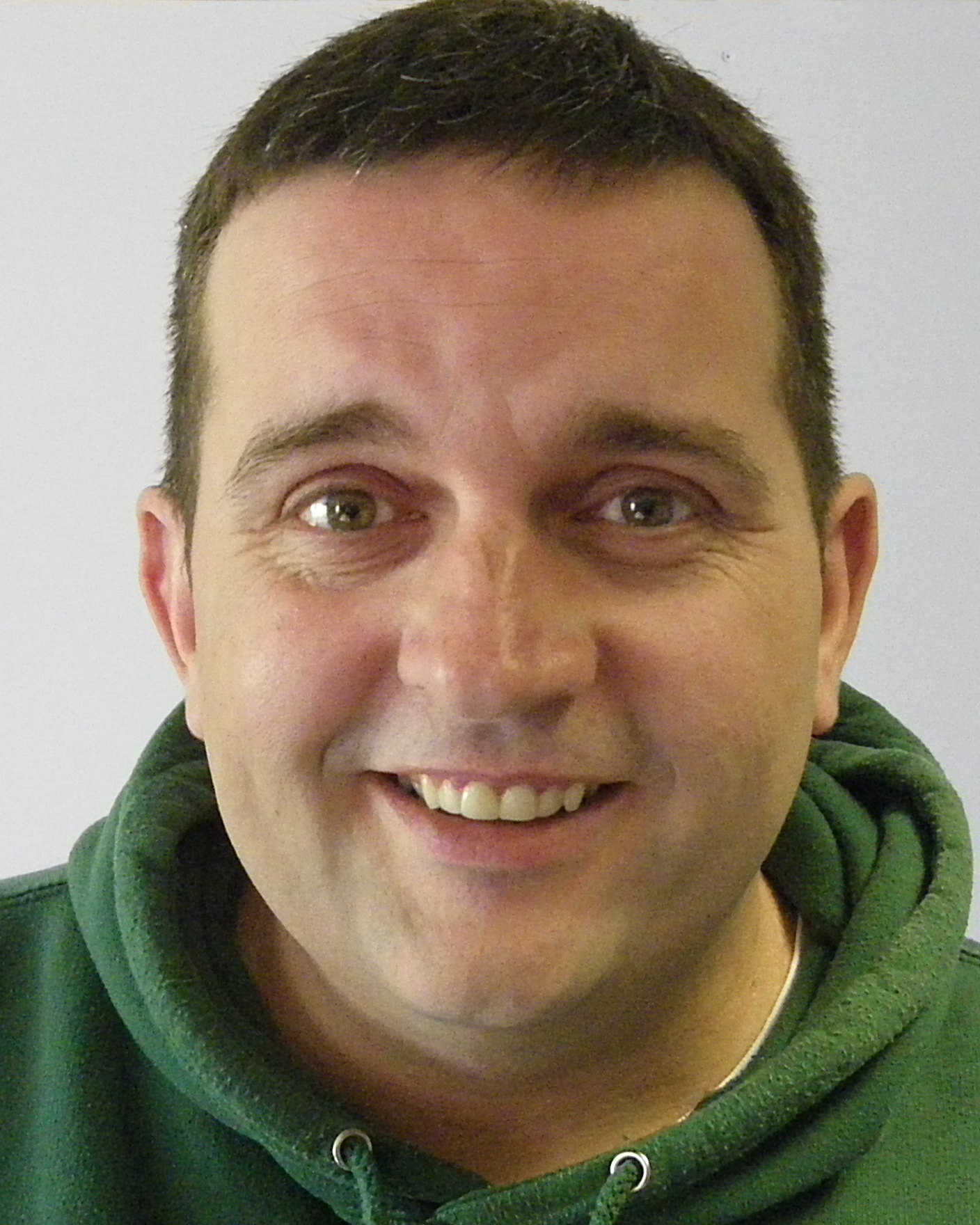
- Derek Pluto Moireach 2015
- Born: Ness, Isle of Lewis, Scotland
- Other name: Pluto
- Occupations: Radio and television presenter, sports commentator
- Years active: 1990s–present
- Employer: BBC
- Known for: An Là, Siubhal gu Seachd le Pluto, Machair
- Awards: Celtic Media Festival – Radio Personality of the Year (2008)

Derek "Pluto" Murray (Scottish Gaelic:Derek Moireach), is a Scottish radio and television presenter.

He is the sports presenter on BBC Alba's flagship news programme, An Là. He also provides football commentary on BBC Alba and BBC Radio nan Gàidheal and is an occasional reporter on BBC Radio Scotland's Sportsound. He was also commentator on An Caman, a shinty highlights package broadcast in 2007.

Murray was named as "Radio Personality of the Year" at the 2008 Celtic Media Festival. Murray is from Ness on the Isle of Lewis and was formerly a policeman with Strathclyde Police.

In the 1990s Murray appeared on the Gaelic soap opera Machair, playing Iain MacIomhair. In 2011 Murray presented Siuthad! Siubhail! (Go! Explore!) with Emma MacInnes. In this series they travelled around Scotland, exploring alternative tourist activities.

He presents his own show on BBC Radio nan Gàidheal, Siubhal gu Seachd le Pluto. He is a supporter of West Ham United F.C.
