= Gilles Vincent =

French writer

Gilles Vincent (born 11 September 1958, Issy-les-Moulineaux) is a French-language writer, author of detective novels, a collection of short stories, a novel and two thrillers for adolescents.

== Works ==
- 2012: Parjures, Jigal Polar
- 2013: Djebel, Jigal Polar
- 2013: Beso de la muerte, Jigal Polar, Cezam Prix Littéraire Inter CE 2014.
- 2014:Trois heures avant l'aube, Jigal Polar
- 2015: Hyenae, Jigal Polar
- 2016: 1,2,3...sommeil! Cairn éditions, Detective novel in the series "Du Noir au Sud".

Sad Sunday obtained the Prix Marseillais du Polar 2010.

- 2011: Les essuie-glaces fatigués rendent les routes incertaines, short stories, Eaux-Fortes
- 2011: Flamencos, éditions Gascogne
- 2014: Gévaudan, le retour de la Bête.
- 2015: Jack l’Éventreur, le retour
