= Timothé Nadim =

French politician and musician

- Born: 19 October 1997 (age 28); Bourgoin-Jallieu, France
- Occupations: activist; journalist; musician
- Years active: (2009–present)
- Known for: Host on Brut.Live (Brut media) (october 2021-november 2022)
- Political party: Agir (2018–february 2022)

Timothé Nadim (born 19 October 1997) is a French anti school bullying activist and musician.

He is known for having changed the public system for fighting school bullying in France in 2021, with his quick help application taken up by President Macron and included in the French public service.

== Early life ==
Nadim was born in Bourgoin Jallieu (Isère) in 1997. In 2009, he started a YouTube channel where he created a series of short movies of humor and action with special effects.

== Biography ==
=== Fight against school bullying ===
In May 2018, he was appointed referent for the youth of the party Act, the Constructive Right for the territory of Nord-Isère. In November 2018, he announced that he became singer for his new French post-grunge band named Breaking Ceremony.

A few days later, he says that he is working on a social network project against school bullying he will soon propose to the French government to replace their current platform. The website should consist of two parts. A first that will be a social network, where child victims can anonymously testify and help each other. The second part will be a section "assistance" with a digital chat communication with professionals, providing information on legal and psychological issues, available without stopping. The "assistance" section will have many resource pages to help victims and parents of victims on topics that have been raised. The idea will be widely relayed by the media, described as innovative and hailed by many child psychologists and associations as breaking all the codes of the current system. In January 2019, he is named referent for the NGO "Respect Zone" for the Rhône-Alpes region.

He is called by ministers Adrien Taquet and Cédric O to present his platform project named S.A.H.S for "Stop the school bullying" to the French government on 17 July 2019. He will meet with member of parliament Agnes Firmin Le Bodo at the National Assembly on 16 July 2019.

In October 2020, he joined the cast of the only special episode on school bullying of the year of the TV show "It Starts Today", alongside Bilal Hassani, Evaelle's parents, and Camille Stengel. The first broadcast takes place on November 5, 2020, on France 2.

On March 12, 2021, his proposals were officially taken up by the Agir party. The same day, Timothé Nadim co-wrote a column in the newspaper l'Opinion with Senator Colette Mélot, to describe his main proposals. The column is co-signed by around thirty elected officials from the Agir party, including Tokia Saïfi, (ex minister), and by numerous senators and deputies, such as Claude Malhuret (senator), Olivier Becht, Pierre-Yves Bournazel, Christophe Euzet, Agnès Firmin Le Bodo, Fabienne Keller (European MP). The column was published a few days after the assassination in France of the little Alisha, the first assassination of a minor in France in a context of school bullying.

In May 2021, an information mission was launched in the Senate in order to fight against school bullying and cyber-harassment. Timothé Nadim was auditioned in the following months by the Senate and in October, the Senate delivered its conclusion and took up a significant number of Timothé Nadim's proposals to fight against school bullying and cyberbullying.

In October 2021, Brut media recruits Timothé Nadim to host the first show dedicated to school bullying on a major media outlet. Timothé Nadim becomes the first independent journalist (excluding Brut journalists) to have authorization to broadcast live on the Brut media application, and also the first person to broadcast live on this application - inaugurating the start of lives on this app. He is then described by the media such as the Dauphiné Libéré, as "the national anti-school bullying man".

At the beginning of December 2021, President Emmanuel Macron took over the "digital chat" part of the application created by Timothé Nadim in 2018 and linked it to the official anti-cyber harassment number of the French State named 3018. The app is named "app 3018". It is MP Agnès Firmin le Bodo, who announces the recovery of Timothé Nadim's app project by President Macron during a public session at the National Assembly at the beginning of December 2021. The previous month, a law was voted by the National Assembly and also included proposals from Timothé Nadim.

On September 27, 2023, Prime Minister Elisabeth Borne announces that the digital chat app 3018 becomes the only global reporting application for cyber bullying as well as school bullying - and that a link on the largest social networks will direct to this application. The official French state application 3018 is actually managed by an NGO.

At the end of 2022, Timothé Nadim announces that he will end his fight against school bullying following the resumption of his application by E.Macron. He also announces leaving the media Brut and devoting himself to a new project.

== Private life ==
In March 2019, he announced to the media that he was diagnosed with Asperger syndrome and that he was a victim of school bullying at the ages of 11 and 14.

== Television shows ==
- It Starts Today : School Bullying, The Fight of a Lifetime (first broadcast on November 5, 2020, on France 2)
