= Hôtel de Ville, Bourgoin-Jallieu =

Town hall in Bourgoin-Jallieu, France

Hôtel de Ville
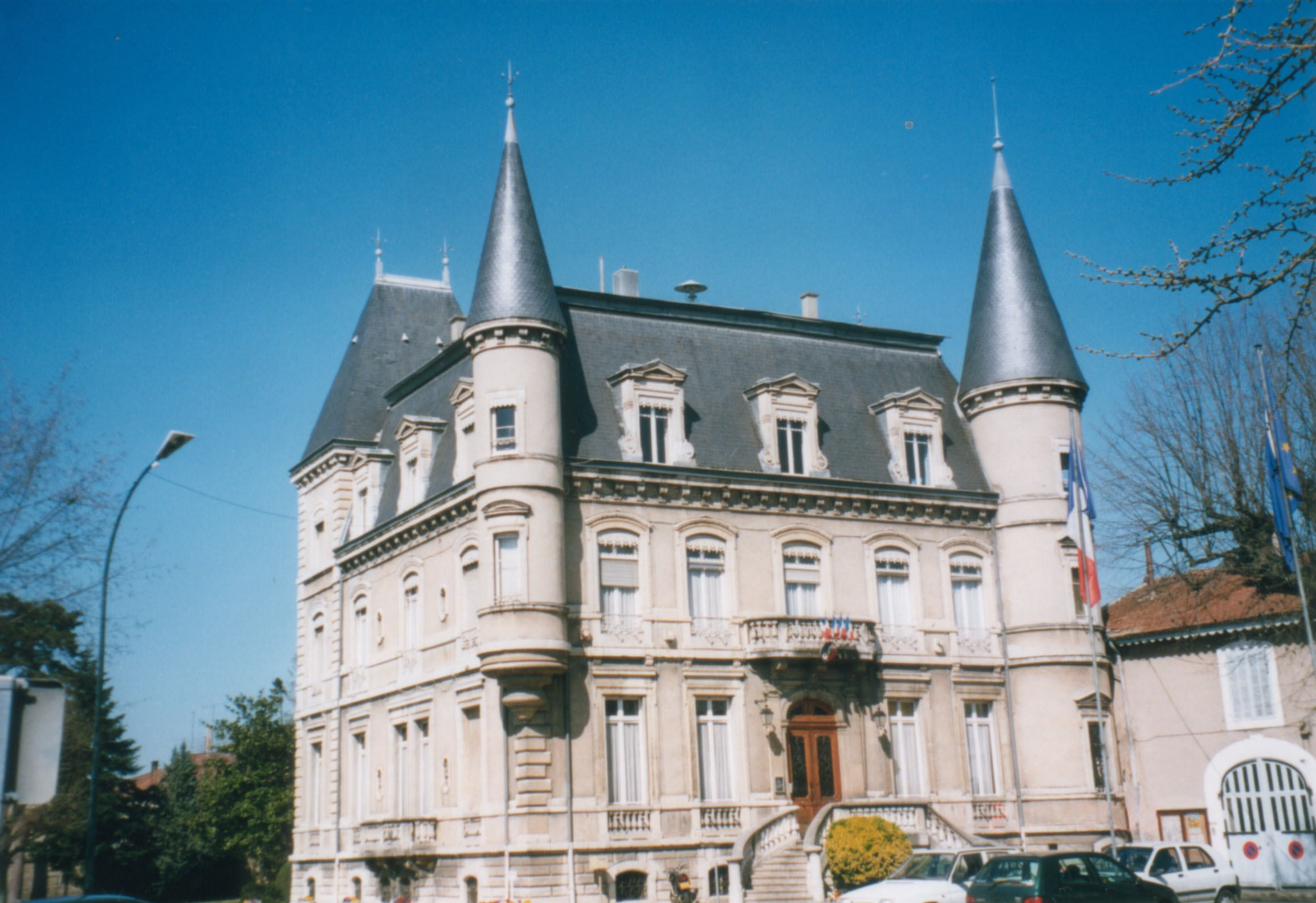
- The main frontage of the Hôtel de Ville in January 2006
- Interactive map of the Hôtel de Ville area

General information
- Type: City hall
- Architectural style: Renaissance Revival style
- Location: Bourgoin-Jallieu, France
- Coordinates: 45.5937°N 5.2764°E
- Completed: 1870

The Hôtel de Ville (French pronunciation: [otɛl də vil], City Hall) is a municipal building in Bourgoin-Jallieu, Isère, in southeastern France, standing on Rue de l'Hôtel de Ville.

== History ==
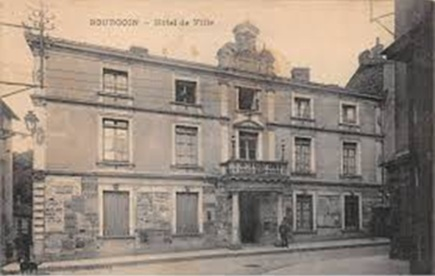
The old town hall in Bourgoin

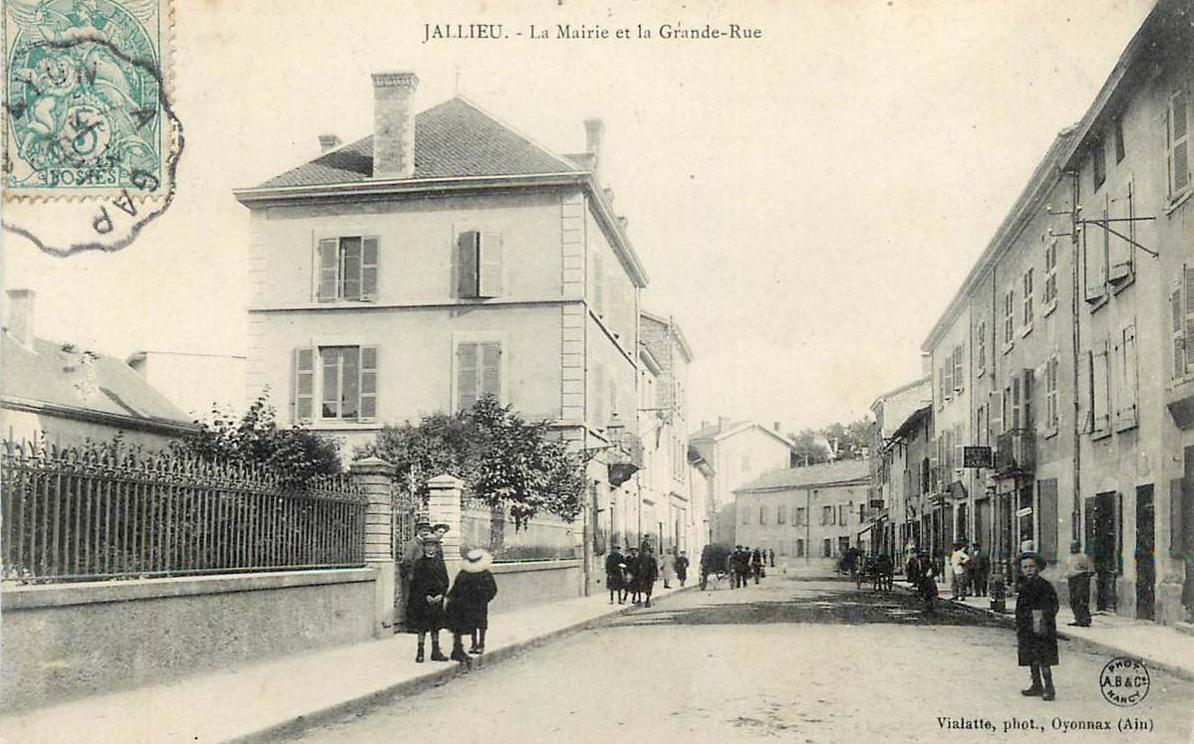
The old town hall of Jallieu

Following the French Revolution the industrial town of Bourgoin in the south of the current conurbation and the small village of Jallieu in the north developed as separate communes. The town council of Bourgoin already owned a town hall on the corner of Rue de l'Escot and Rue de la Liberté. The site had originally accommodated the Porte de Bourbre, which was one of the four great gates to the town.

The old town hall of Bourgoin had been designed in the neoclassical style, built in rubble masonry and had been completed in 1772. The design involved a symmetrical main frontage of five bays facing onto Rue de la Liberté. The central bay featured a portico formed by a pair of Doric order columns supporting an entablature. On the first floor, there was a French door with a pediment and a balustraded balcony and, on the second floor, there was a square casement window. The other bays were fenestrated by casement windows with stone surrounds. After the building was no longer required for municipal use it was converted for use as a police station. An extensive programme of refurbishment works was completed at a cost of €1.4 million in October 2025.

Meanwhile, the town council of Jallieu established their town hall on the west side of the Grande Rue (now Rue de la Libération). The design involved a symmetrical main frontage of three bays facing onto the Grande Rue. The central bay featured a square headed doorway on the ground floor, a French door with an iron railing on the first floor and a square window on the second floor. The outer bays were fenestrated in a similar style.

After the First World War, the town council of Jallieu decided to acquire a more substantial municipal building. The building they selected was on the north side of what is now Rue de l'Hôtel de Ville, not far from the south bank of the River Bourbre. The building had been commissioned by Louis-Antonin Lupin and his wife, Auguste-Joséphine Seignoret, who had inherited a large amount of money from her mother, Julie Miège. It was designed in the Renaissance Revival style, built in ashlar stone and was completed in around 1870.

The design involved a symmetrical main frontage of five bays facing towards what is now Rue Maréchal-Foch. The central bay featured a forestair leading up to a round headed doorway which was flanked by pilasters. On the first floor, there was a segmental headed French door with a balustraded balcony. The other bays were fenestrated by square headed casement windows with cornices on the ground floor and by segmental headed casement windows on the first floor. At roof level, there a modillioned cornice and a series of dormer windows, and there were bartizans with conical roofs at the corners. Internally, the building featured an ornate entrance hall and a grand staircase leading up to the Grand Salon on the first floor. The Grand Salon was converted for use as the Salle des Mariages (wedding room) after the building was acquired by town council of Jallieu in 1926.

The building went on to become the town hall for the combined authority when the communes of Bourgoin and Jallieu merged in January 1967. In 2014, a long two-storey building to the northeast of the main building was refurbished to a design by P. S. Architects to create a new reception area, a new registry office and space for additional services. A major programme of refurbishment works, involving repairs to the façade of the main building, new windows and new internal panelling, was completed at a cost of €1.3 million in 2020.
