= Machair (TV series) =

- Opening title
- Genre: Soap opera
- Created by: Peter May; Janice Hally
- Country of origin: United Kingdom
- Original language: Scottish Gaelic
- No. of series: 12
- No. of episodes: 151

Production
- Production location: Isle of Lewis
- Running time: 25 minutes
- Production company: Scottish Television

Original release
- Network: Scottish Television; Grampian Television
- Release: 6 January 1993 – 6 April 1999

Machair is a Scottish Gaelic television soap opera produced by Scottish Television Enterprises between 6 January 1993 and 6 April 1999.

== History ==
The series was created and developed by Peter May and Janice Hally who was also the storyliner and principal scriptwriter. As there was no history of large-scale television drama output in the Gaelic language, the pair spent two years of preparatory work on the creation of the show. Their initial proposal for Head of Drama at Scottish Television, Robert Love, included details not only of the characters and storylines for the show but details of the process required to find, recruit and train actors and writers. They went on to conduct actors' workshops, screentests, and writing courses to train the talent they had found to a professional standard for television.

Machair was written in English and translated into Gaelic, then given English subtitles and broadcast at peak viewing time. Although the concept was initially greeted with derision by the press, when the show aired it received unanimous praise from reviewers. Kenneth Roy, television critic of Scotland on Sunday, described it as "a credit to the company [Scottish Television] and a smack in the face to those of us who were doubtful" and after a few episodes said "it is even better than it looked at first glance quite simply the best thing to have happened to television in Scotland for a long time". Viewers were in accord with him as it achieved a 30% audience share and made it into the top ten of programmes viewed in Scotland, despite that fewer than 2% of the Scottish population could speak Gaelic. It was nominated for awards for production and writing from The Celtic Film Festival and Writers Guild of Great Britain.

Along with Janice Hally, Ann Marie Di Mambro was a scriptwriter for the series. Among the Gaelic writers employed were Anne Frater, Donald Smith, Iain Finlay Macleod, and Aonghas 'Dubh' MacNeacail. Regular cast members included Simon MacKenzie, Anna Murray, Kenny MacRae, Duncan MacNeil and Tony Kearney.

It was shot entirely on location on the Isle of Lewis in the Outer Hebrides from 1992 to 1996, and after 1996 interior scenes were shot in Studio Alba, which was originally built to accommodate it in Stornoway. The series was funded by the Gaelic Television Committee, and according to government reports, had the effect of creating jobs and boosting the economy in the islands.

The writing and producer team of May and Hally made the first ninety-nine half-hour episodes. After they left, further episodes were made but audience figures dropped and the show was cancelled,

The programme was given a second screening on BBC Alba, the dedicated Scottish Gaelic language digital television channel, and is regularly repeated on the channel.

== Cast and characters ==
Actor	Character	Duration
Simon MacKenzie	Aonghas MacLeod	1.01- 12.07
Iain MacRae	Ruaraidh Campbell	1.01 – 12.07
Shaun Scott	Jamie Spencer	1.01 – 1.13, 3.12-4.03, 5.12-5.13
Ann Swan	Jenny Campbell	1.01 – 8.13
Alyxis Daly	Morag MacRae	1.01 – ?
Maggie MacKenzie	Fiona MacAsgill	1.01 – 12.07
Domhnaill Ruadh	Fionnlagh MacRath	1.01 – 7.06
Mina Smith	Annag MacRath	1.01 – 12.07
Martin MacIntyre	Anndra MacDonald	1.01 – 1.13
Anna Murray	Mairead MacAsgail	1.01 – ?
Derek Murray	Iain MacIver	1.01 – ?
Donna Morrison	Marsaili MacSween	1.01 -12.07
Erica MacPherson	Cairistonia Stuart	1.01 – 12.07
Tony Kearney	Calum MacNeil	1.01 – ?
Artair Donald	Coinneach MacArthur	1.01 – ?
Dolina MacLennan	Iseabel MacIver	1.01 – 12.07
Naomi MacLeod	Sine MacIver	1.01 – ?
Michelle McDonald	Kirsty Campbell	1.01 – ?
Evelyn Coull	Kirsty Campbell	? – 12.07
Donald MacSween	Eachann MacPhee	1.01- 1.13
Eliza Langland	Eilidh MacLeod	1.01-4.04
Donald Homson	Seoras Grant	1.01 – ?
Ceit Kearney	Annmarie Morrison	1.09 – 3.13
Robert Urquhart	Menzies Fairbairn	2.01 – 2.13
Erika Hoffman	Charlotte Van Agten	3.01 -7.06
Diarmuid de Faoite	Seán Donoghue	4.01 – 5.07

== Episodes ==
- Series 1: 13eps – 1993
- Series 2: 13eps – 1993
- Series 3: 13eps – 1994
- Series 4: 13eps – 1994
- Series 5: 13eps – 1995
- Series 6: 13eps – 1995
- Series 7: 13eps – 1996
- Series 8: 13eps – 1996
- Series 9: 13eps – 1997
- Series 10: 13eps – 1997
- Series 11: 13eps – 1998
- Series 12: 7eps – 1999
