= Lockdown (novel) =

2020 mystery thriller by Peter May

- Author: Peter May
- Language: English
- Genre: Thriller
- Published: 2020
- Publisher: Quercus
- Publication date: 2 April 2020 (e-book); 30 April 2020 (paperback)
- Publication place: United Kingdom
- Media type: Print (paperback), e-book
- ISBN: 978-1-52941-168-3

Lockdown is a 2020 mystery thriller by Scottish crime writer Peter May, set against the background of a deadly influenza pandemic. He wrote it in 2005, but it was rejected for publication as unrealistic. It was published in April 2020, during the COVID-19 pandemic and its resulting lockdowns.

== Plot summary ==
Five months into an influenza pandemic that kills 80% of those affected, London is in lockdown. The city is under military control, a strict curfew is in force and there is extensive public surveillance. Among those who have died from the virus are the prime minister and members of his family.

Detective Inspector Jack MacNeil is ordered to investigate the discovery of fresh human bones found at a building site in Lambeth. A thumbprint on a London Underground ticket found at the scene takes him along a chain of clues, eventually leading to an empty house in Wandsworth. At every step of the way, he is surreptitiously followed by a sociopathic killer who calls himself Pinkie (after the antihero of Graham Greene's novel, Brighton Rock). Pinkie has been hired by a shadowy "Mr. Smith" to keep watch on the police investigation and to ensure the bones don't lead them anywhere. Pinkie kills two witnesses to prevent them from giving information to MacNeil.

Meanwhile, Dr. Amy Wu, a forensic scientist who is in a relationship with MacNeil, determines that the remains are probably those of a girl of about ten years of age, of East Asian origin, and with a harelip. She takes the bones back to her flat to do a facial reconstruction from the skull.

At the house in Wandsworth, a neighbour tells MacNeil that the house was recently occupied by a couple named Smith who had a ten-year-old adopted daughter, a Chinese girl with a harelip.

Pinkie surreptitiously enters Amy's flat while she is taking a shower. Sensing the presence of the intruder, she phones MacNeil and leaves a panic-stricken voicemail message.

While preparing to break into the house in Wandsworth, MacNeil encounters Dr. Sara Castelli, an investigator with the Health Protection Agency who believes that the Chinese girl was the source of the pandemic. After MacNeil retrieves Amy's voicemail message, he and Castelli hurry to her flat, but they find it empty. An instant messaging chat window that is open on Amy's computer indicates that she has been discussing the case with her mentor, Dr. Samantha Looker. At Looker's flat, they discover that the mentor has been murdered (by Pinkie) and her chats with Amy have been hijacked by a third party, who turns out to be Mr. Smith. Using the chat window to communicate, Smith threatens to kill Amy unless MacNeil hands over whatever evidence the police have against him.

They meet at the London Eye, where Pinkie is holding Amy at gun-point in a pod at the top of the wheel. Smith is revealed to be Dr. Roger Blume, an executive of an international pharmaceutical company. Blume tells MacNeil that his company had created the virus artificially to make money from selling a vaccine. The Chinese girl had been intentionally infected and the virus allowed to spread. She had been killed to suppress the evidence.

In a fit of anger, Castelli tries to shoot Blume, who escapes by climbing up the outside of the wheel toward the pod where Pinkie is holding Amy. MacNeil follows. In a final struggle, Blume gets the better of MacNeil and is about to hurl him to his death when, in a moment of remorse, Pinkie shoots Blume and helps MacNeil to safety, falling to his death as he does so.

== Background ==
May wrote Lockdown over six weeks in 2005, but it was rejected by publishers in the UK who thought that the portrayal of London under siege by a flu epidemic was unrealistic. He put the manuscript to one side and turned his attention to other projects. In 2020, when the COVID-19 pandemic was forcing countries around the world into lockdowns, a reader suggested to May that he write a novel against the background of the pandemic. May later said, "I thought about it for a minute before I realized that I've kind of already done it. I told my publisher about it and my editor just about fell out of his chair. He read the entire book overnight and the next morning he said, 'This is brilliant. We need to publish this now.'"

The book was published as a Kindle e-book on 2 April 2020 by Riverrun, a Quercus imprint. A paperback edition followed on 30 April.

On publication, May announced that the profits from the book would be donated to charities supporting health workers and other COVID-19 victims. Shortly after publication, he used part of the advance to donate six iPads to NHS Western Isles for use in its virtual visiting service.
