= Jean-Paul Didierlaurent =

French writer (1962–2021)

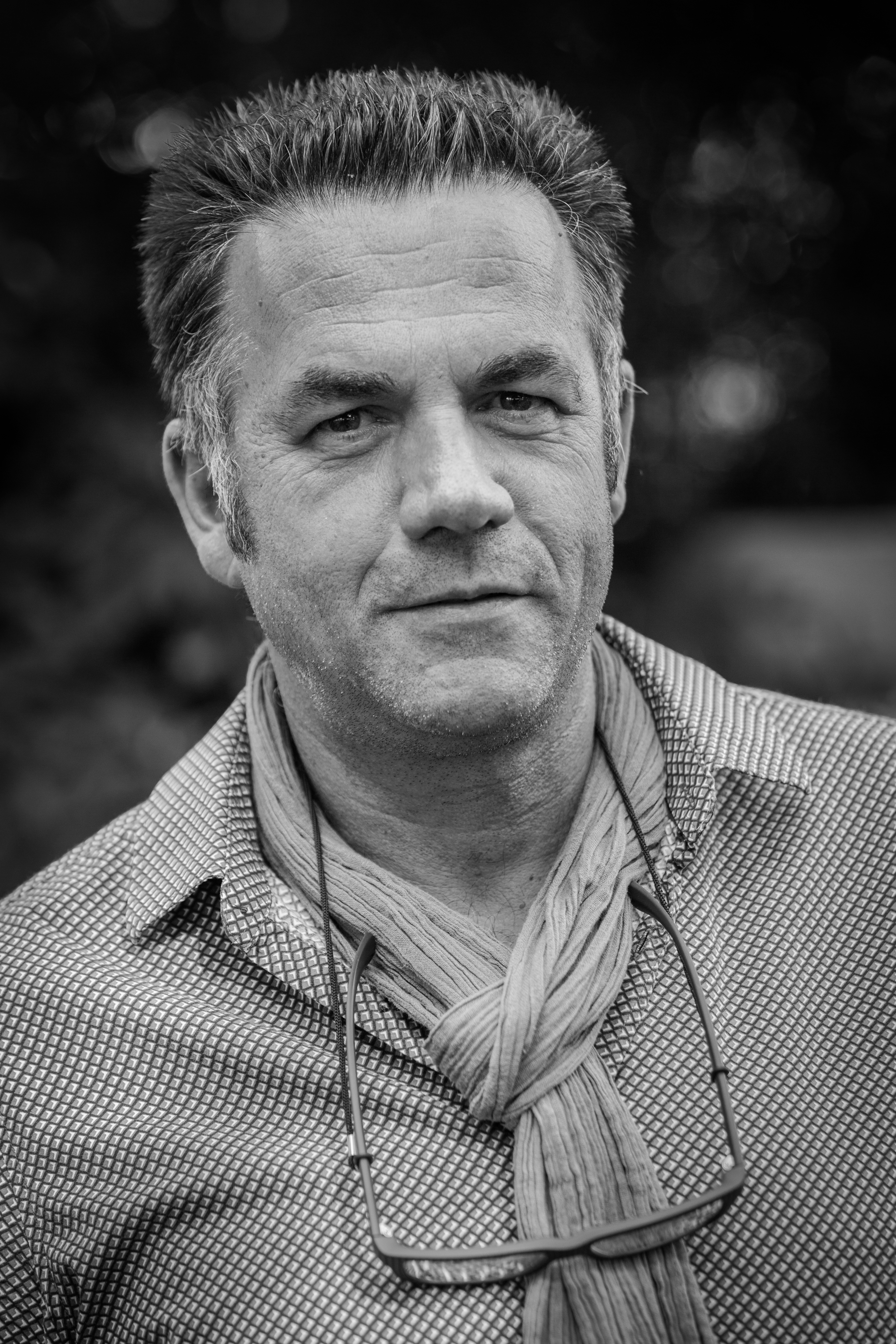
Didierlaurent in 2014

Jean-Paul Didierlaurent (2 March 1962 – 5 December 2021) was a French writer.

== Career ==
He is best known for the novel The Reader on the 6.27 (Le liseur du 6h27, 2014), translated into English by Ros Schwartz and published by Pan Books in 2015 (ISBN 978-1-4472-7649-4).

Didierlaurent was awarded the 2015 Cezam Prix Littéraire Inter CE for Le liseur du 6h27.

Didierlaurent's second novel Le reste de leur vie was also translated by Ros Schwartz and was published as The Rest of Their Lives by Mantle in 2017 (ISBN 9781509840342).
