= Angèle Jacq =

French novelist (1937–2021)

Angèle Jacq (1937 – April 12, 2021) was Breton writer. Born in Landudal, she was a farmer who became a bank employee. From 1995, she began writing historical novels located in Brittany.

In 2003, her literary work earned her the collar of the Order of the Ermine, bestowed by the Institut culturel de Bretagne. She also was a committed advocate of the Breton language, of which she was a speaker. She took a stand against the destruction of the collective memory of the Bretons and for a popular education detached from the State.

== Works ==
Historical novels:

- 1995: Les braises de la liberté, Éditions France-Empire. Reprinted in 2010 by Coop Breizh, this novel has a sequel, Tinaig, also published by Coop Breizh
- 1997: Légendes de Bretagne, France-Empire
- 1999: Le voyage de Jabel, Edilarge, Cezam Prix Littéraire Inter CE in 2000
- 2002: Ma langue au chat, Le Palémon
- In the series Les hommes libres :
  - 2003: Volume 1: Ils n'avaient que leurs mains, Le Palémon
  - 2005: Volume 2: Un brassard et des sabots, Le Palémon
  - 2007: Volume 3: Liberté Frankiz Fahafana, Le Palémon
