= The Blackhouse =

Suspense thriller novel by Peter May

- Paperback edition
- Author: Peter May
- Language: English
- Series: The Lewis Trilogy
- Genre: Novel
- Publisher: Quercus
- Publication date: 2011
- Media type: Print (hardcover and paperback)
- Pages: 475 (paperback)
- ISBN: 978-1-84916-386-6
- Followed by: The Lewis Man

The Blackhouse is a suspense thriller, the first novel of The Lewis Trilogy, written by the Scottish writer Peter May.

In 2011, The Blackhouse won the 2011 Cezam Prix Littéraire Inter CE, a readers' prize for best novel by a European author, published in France.

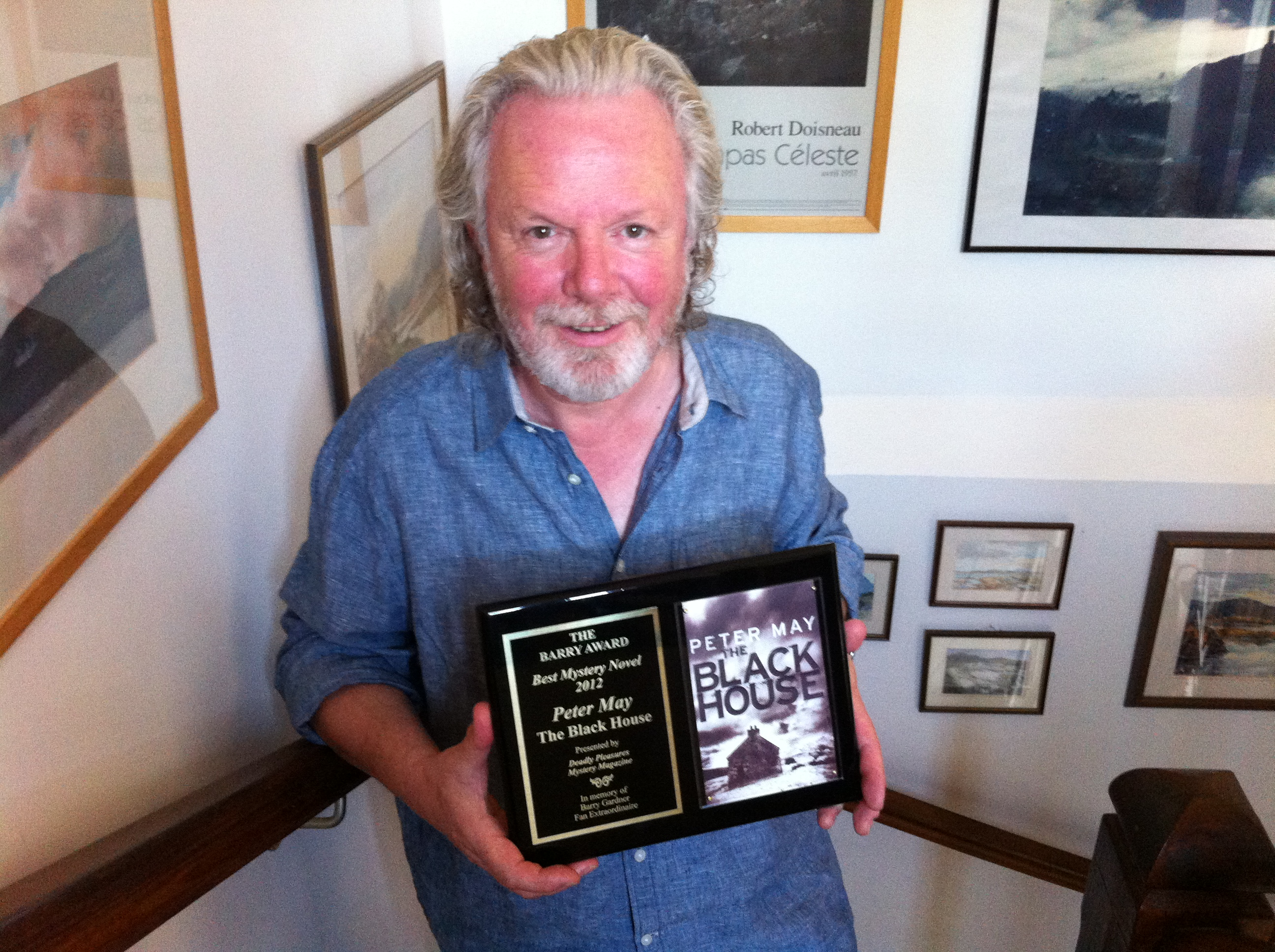
Peter May with the 2013 Barry Award for Best Novel, for The Blackhouse.

In 2013, The Blackhouse won the Barry Award for Best Novel of the Year at a ceremony at Bouchercon, in Albany, New York, US.

The novel was adapted as a full-cast BBC Radio serial consisting of four 30 minute episodes. Cal MacAninch starred as Fin.

== Plot ==
The action takes place mostly on the remote and weather-beaten Isle of Lewis off the coast of northern Scotland. The protagonist, Detective Inspector Finlay Macleod (known as Fin), a native of the island, is sent from his Edinburgh police station to investigate the murder of a man who, it transpires, was the bully at Fin's school. The modus operandi of the crime resembles a murder that Fin recently investigated in Edinburgh, so there is the possibility of a common perpetrator.

The story unfolds as the chapters alternate between present-day events, written in the third person, and Fin's childhood, written in the first person. As the narrative progresses, it emerges that Fin and his childhood story are intimately linked with the murder.
