= Cezam Prix Littéraire Inter CE =

Prix Roman Cezam
- Awarded for: Readers' prize for best novel by a European author, published in France
- Location: Europe
- Country: France
- Presented by: Cezam network
- First award: 1997
- Website: Prix Roman Cezam

The Prix Roman Cezam is a literary prize which was established in France in 1997. Its judging panel of more than 3600 readers who meet in groups to discuss, critique and individually rate the books, makes it one of the largest adjudicated readers' prizes for literature in the world. It is organised by the French national network of comités d'entreprise (committees in workplaces of public and private enterprises which organise social and cultural events locally, and nationwide).

The prize brings together readers from all over France and from all walks of life who are connected through their workplace or community. They are registered and organised in groups by local librarians, supported by 40 independent bookstores and the network of 360 comités d'entreprise. A shortlist of ten novels is selected each year from medium and small scale French publishing houses by the Cezam Prix Litteraire organisers and the prize has a history of discovering new authors, such as Claudie Gallay, Tiffany McDaniel and Mélissa Da Costa, before they become bestsellers.

The jury panels meet in workplaces, libraries, bookstores, high schools, colleges and even penitentiaries. Author events are organised across France, with shortlisted writers from around the world being invited to visit the various regions to speak to and answer questions from the groups of readers. Each reader then awards ratings on several criteria for each of the books that they have read and these ratings are gathered and counted to determine the winning book. There are two levels of the prize: the votes are first counted at a local level to determine a winner for each of 25 regions then the votes are aggregated to determine the overall national prize-winner.

The 2011 winner was announced on Saturday 15 October in Strasbourg as Scottish author Peter May for his book The Blackhouse (L'Ile des Chasseurs d'Oiseaux).

== Origin and aims of the prize ==
The prize was organised initially as a local prize in Nantes and Angers, but grew through the network of Cezam to encompass France. It exists to promote reading, literacy and literature, not only by bringing groups of readers together to exchange thoughts with each other, but also by giving them the chance to meet and speak to the authors of the books.

== Previous winners ==
- 1997: Alain Monnier Un amour de Parpot
- 1998/9: Georges-Jean Arnaud Le rat de la Conciergerie
- 2000: Angèle Jacq Le voyage de Jabel
- 2001: Françoise Moreau Eau-forte
- 2002: Christian Petit Bombay Victoria
- 2003: Soazig Aaron Le non de Klara
- 2004: Emmanuel Dongala Johnny chien méchant
- 2005: Thierry Maugenest, for Venise.net
- 2006: Bertina Henrichs La joueuse d'échecs
- 2007: Maïssa Bey Bleu, blanc, vert
- 2008: Pierre Bordage Porteur d'âmes
- 2009: Marie-Sabine Roger La tête en friche
- 2010: Sebastian Barry Le testament caché (The Secret Scripture)
- 2011: Peter May, L'ile des chasseurs d'oiseaux (The Blackhouse)
- 2012: Dan Waddel, for Code 1879
- 2013: Hélène Gestern, for Eux sur la photo
- 2014: Gilles Vincent, for Beso de la muerte
- 2015: Jean-Paul Didierlaurent, for Le liseur du 6h27
- 2016: Valentina D'Urbano, for Acquanera
- 2017: Hubert François, for Dulmaa
- 2018: Colin Niel, for Seules les bêtes
- 2019: Benoît Philippon, for Mamie Luger
- 2020: Mélissa Da Costa, for Tout le bleu du ciel
- 2021: Tiffany McDaniel, for Betty
- 2022: Carole Declerq, for Les enfants d'Ulysse
- 2023: Olivier Dorchamps, for Fuir l'Eden
- 2024: Pauline Hillier, for Les contemplées
