= Dramarama (TV series) =

- Genre: Drama; Science fiction
- Created by: Anna Home
- Starring: varied by episode
- Country of origin: United Kingdom
- Original language: English
- No. of series: 7
- No. of episodes: 91

Production
- Executive producer: varied by episode
- Producer: varied by episode
- Running time: 30 minutes
- Production company: Various ITV contractors

Original release
- Network: ITV (CITV)
- Release: 12 September 1983 – 21 August 1989

Dramarama is a British children's anthology series broadcast on ITV between 12 September 1983 and 21 August 1989. The series tended to feature single dramas with a science fiction, supernatural and occasionally satirical theme. It was created by Anna Home, then head of children's and youth programming at TVS; however, the dramas themselves were produced by a total of twelve ITV regional companies. Thus, each episode was in practice a one-off production with its own cast and crew, up to and including the executive producer. Some episodes (not listed in the episode guide below) were originally produced for the 1981 ITV children's anthology series Theatre Box and then were re-screened as Dramarama episodes.

Dramarama was largely a showcase for new talent to television and offered debuts for Anthony Horowitz, Paul Abbott, Kay Mellor, Janice Hally, Tony Kearney, David Tennant and Ann Marie Di Mambro. It was also one of Dennis Spooner's last works.

One of the stories, Thames' "Dodger, Bonzo And The Rest" from 1984, proved so popular that it was spun off into its own series and Christmas special the following year – the series starred Lee Ross and recounted life in a large foster home. Another story, Granada's "Blackbird Singing in the Dead of Night" from 1988, was developed into the long-running series Children's Ward. The original Dramarama story was co-written by Paul Abbott and Kay Mellor – at the time, working as staff writers for Granada.

The series has rarely been repeated in recent years, although two episodes – "Blackbird Singing in the Dead of Night" and "Back to Front" – were broadcast on the CITV channel as part of a 30th anniversary weekend in January 2013.

Only four ITV companies of the time did not contribute to the series: Anglia, Channel, Grampian and LWT. TVS produced the greatest number of episodes.

== Availability and archive status ==
A videotape containing the episodes "Big T for Trouble", "Just Wild About Harry" and "Venchie" (all Tyne Tees productions) was released by Video Gems, c. 1990. It is now out of print.

All episodes produced by Thames Television have been released on DVD by Network on 13 January 2012, who have also released the 1983 series Spooky which was shown under the Dramarama banner on 15 August 2011. The home video rights to the remaining episodes are held by ITV Studios, aside from those produced by Scottish, TVS and the one episode produced by TSW. The TVS episodes cannot be released commercially but some have appeared on YouTube, and STV itself placed all its episodes on YouTube in 2010, but has since removed them.

Three episodes produced by TVS, Rachel and Rosie, The Creature Beyond Torches End, and Now You See Them, are currently listed as missing according to archive television research organisation Kaleidoscope. However, the first two of these have appeared on YouTube.

== Episodes ==
Series	Episodes	Originally released	
Series	Episodes	First released	Last released
Spooky	7	18 April 1983	13 June 1983
1	9	12 September 1983	7 November 1983
2	12	14 May 1984	6 August 1984
3	13	1 April 1985	15 July 1985
4	14	30 June 1986	30 December 1986
5	16	30 March 1987	24 August 1987
6	16	9 May 1988	4 January 1989
7	11	12 June 1989	21 August 1989

=== Spooky (1983) ===
No. in series	Title	Company	Original release date
1	"War Games with Caroline"	Thames	18 April 1983
2	"The Exorcism of Amy"	Thames	25 April 1983
3	"The Danny Roberts Show"	Thames	9 May 1983
4	"The Ghostly Earl"	Thames	16 May 1983
5	"In a Dark, Dark Box"	Thames	23 May 1983
6	"The Restless Ghost"	Thames	30 May 1983
7	"The Keeper"	Thames	13 June 1983

=== Series 1 (1983) ===
No. overall	No. in series	Title	Company	Original release date
1	1	"Mighty Mum and the Petnappers"	TVS	12 September 1983
2	2	"Rip It Up"	TVS	19 September 1983
3	3	"The Venchie"	Tyne Tees	26 September 1983
4	4	"Jack and the Computer"	TVS	3 October 1983
5	5	"Because I Say So"	Central	10 October 1983
6	6	"Bully For Cosmo"	Central	17 October 1983
7	7	"Messages"	Tyne Tees	24 October 1983
8	8	"The Young Person's Guide to Getting Their Ball Back!"	TVS	31 October 1983
9	9	"Sweet Revenge"	Central	7 November 1983

=== Series 2 (1984) ===
No. overall	No. in series	Title	Company	Original release date
10	1	"Night of the Narrow Boats"	Central	14 May 1984
11	2	"Fowl Pest"	TVS	21 May 1984
12	3	"Dodger, Bonzo and the Rest"	Thames	4 June 1984
13	4	"Que Sera"	TVS	11 June 1984
14	5	"Stalemate"	Central	18 June 1984
15	6	"Snoop!"	Thames	25 June 1984
16	7	"Mr. Stabs "	Thames	2 July 1984
17	8	"Josephine Jo"	Central	9 July 1984
18	9	"The Purple People Eater"	TVS	16 July 1984
19	10	"On Your Tod"	Thames	23 July 1984
20	11	"The Old Firm: Two For Starters"	Granada	30 July 1984
21	12	"Rachel and Rosie"	TVS	6 August 1984

=== Series 3 (1985) ===
No. overall	No. in series	Title	Company	Original release date
22	1	"Easy"	TVS	1 April 1985
23	2	"The Coal Princess"	Tyne Tees	15 April 1985
24	3	"Look at Me"	Central	22 April 1985
25	4	"The Young Person's Guide to Going Backwards in the World"	TVS	29 April 1985
26	5	"The Audition"	Tyne Tees	13 May 1985
27	6	"The Universe Downstairs"	TVS	20 May 1985
28	7	"A Proper Little Nooryeff"	Central	3 June 1985
29	8	"Frog"	TVS	10 June 1985
30	9	"Private Eye"	Scottish	17 June 1985
31	10	"Emily"	TVS	24 June 1985
32	11	"Silver"	Scottish	1 July 1985
33	12	"The Golden Conch"	HTV Wales	8 July 1985
34	13	"Purple Passion Video"	HTV West	15 July 1985

=== Series 4 (1986) ===
No. overall	No. in series	Title	Company	Original release date
35	1	"The Come-Uppance of Captain Katt"	TVS	30 June 1986
36	2	"A Couple of Charlies"	Central	7 July 1986
37	3	"Wayfarers"	Scottish	14 July 1986
38	4	"Play Acting"	HTV Wales	21 July 1986
39	5	"Last Days at Black Bert's"	TVS	28 July 1986
40	6	"Maureen Reid Where Are You?"	Scottish	4 August 1986
41	7	"Flashback"	HTV West	11 August 1986
42	8	"Direct Action"	TVS	18 August 1986
43	9	"Waiting For Elvis"	Scottish	1 September 1986
44	10	"Just a Game"	TVS	8 September 1986
45	11	"Flyaway Friend"	Tyne Tees	15 September 1986
46	12	"Pig Ignorance"	Thames	22 September 1986
47	13	"Jessie's Place"	Thames	29 September 1986
48	14	"Frankie's Hat"	Thames	30 December 1986

=== Series 5 (1987) ===
No. overall	No. in series	Title	Company	Original release date
49	1	"Cannondrum"	TVS	30 March 1987
50	2	"Snap"	TVS	6 April 1987
51	3	"The Horrible Story"	Thames	13 April 1987
52	4	"My Friend Julie"	Thames	27 April 1987
53	5	"The Creature Beyond Torches' End"	TVS	11 May 1987
54	6	"My Mum's a Courgette"	Scottish	18 May 1987
55	7	"Brainwaves"	Scottish	8 June 1987
56	8	"Undertow of the Armada"	Ulster	15 June 1987
57	9	"Stan's First Night"	Scottish	22 June 1987
58	10	"Living Doll"	TVS	29 June 1987
59	11	"Peter"	Central	6 July 1987
60	12	"The Halt"	Central	13 July 1987
61	13	"Mr. Magus is Waiting For You"	Thames	27 July 1987
62	14	"Tam"	HTV West	3 August 1987
63	15	"A Sprited Performance"	HTV Wales	10 August 1987
64	16	"Badger on the Barge"	Border	24 August 1987

=== Series 6 (1988–89) ===
No. overall	No. in series	Title	Company	Original release date
65	1	"Forever Young"	Granada	9 May 1988
66	2	"The Macramé Man"	Scottish	16 May 1988
67	3	"The Wrong Button"	Central	23 May 1988
68	4	"Bubbles"	Granada	6 June 1988
69	5	"Blackbird Singing in the Dead of Night"	Granada	13 June 1988
70	6	"Big T for Trouble"	Tyne Tees	20 June 1988
71	7	"Room for One More"	Scottish	27 June 1988
72	8	"Making Waves"	TVS	4 July 1988
73	9	"Just a Normal Girl"	Central	11 July 1988
74	10	"Now You See Them"	TVS	18 July 1988
75	11	"Bogeyman"	TVS	25 July 1988
76	12	"The Alien"	Border	1 August 1988
77	13	"The Secret of Croftmore"	Scottish	8 August 1988
78	14	"The Bubblegum Brigade"	HTV West	15 August 1988
79	15	"Playing for Wales"	HTV Wales	22 August 1988
80	16	"Snap Decision"	Central	4 January 1989

=== Series 7 (1989) ===
No. overall	No. in series	Title	Company	Original release date
81	1	"Codzmorf"	TVS	12 June 1989
82	2	"Ghost Story"	Granada	19 June 1989
83	3	"Badger"	Granada	26 June 1989
84	4	"Back to Front"	Yorkshire	3 July 1989
85	5	"Monstrous"	HTV Wales	10 July 1989
86	6	"The Pisces Connection"	HTV West	17 July 1989
87	7	"Rosie the Great"	Thames	24 July 1989
88	8	"Snakes and Loofahs"	Border	31 July 1989
89	9	"Just Wild About Harry"	Tyne Tees	7 August 1989
90	10	"Mitchin"	TSW	14 August 1989
91	11	"In the Pink"	Central	21 August 1989
