= Bourgoin-Jallieu =

Bourgoin-Jallieu Brégon (Arpitan)
- Commune
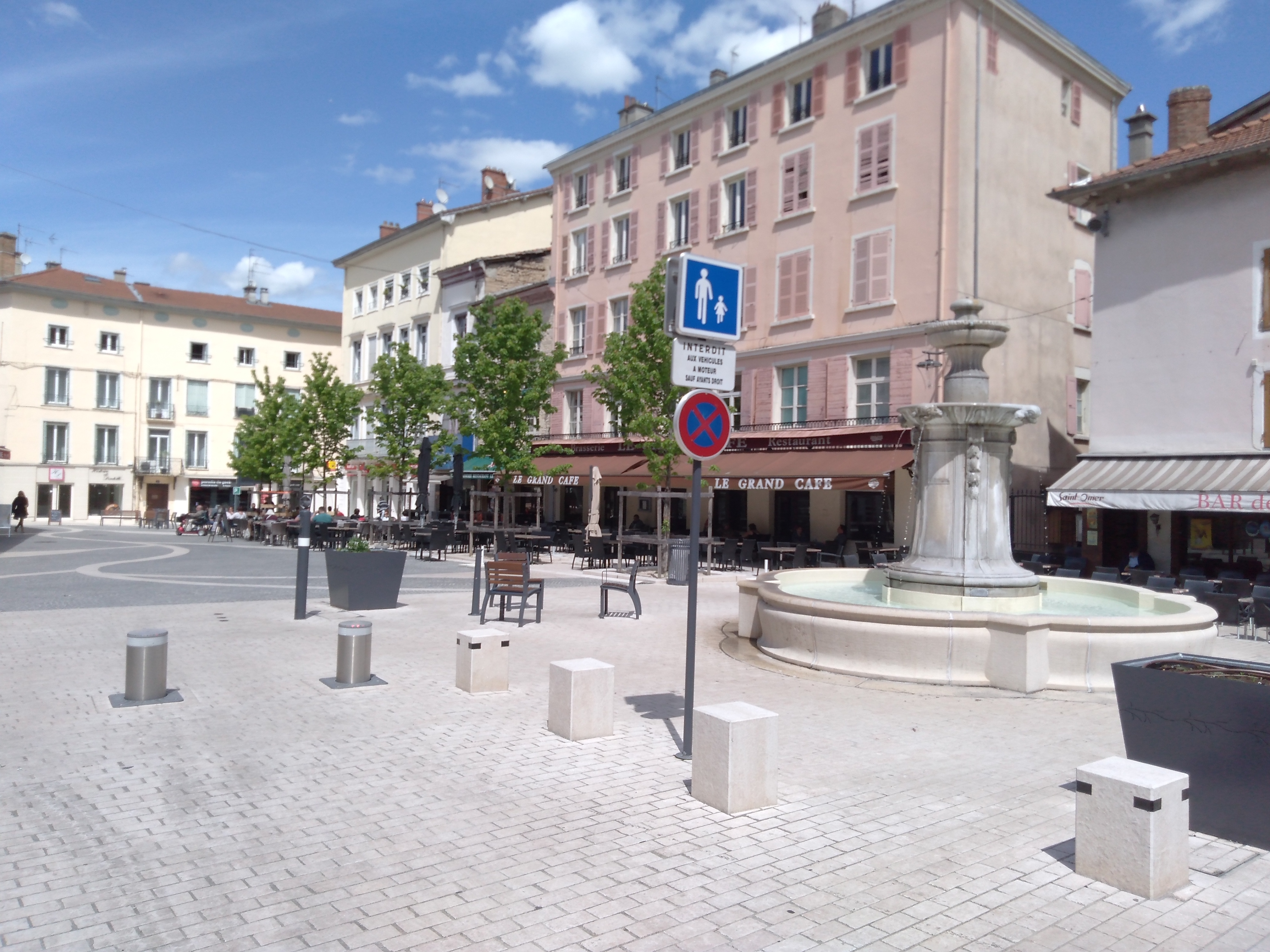
- Bourgoin-Jallieu city centre

- Coat of arms
- Location of Bourgoin-Jallieu
- Location within France Location within Auvergne-Rhône-Alpes
- Coordinates: 45°35′10″N 5°16′25″E
- Country: France
- Region: Auvergne-Rhône-Alpes
- Department: Isère
- Arrondissement: La Tour-du-Pin
- Canton: Bourgoin-Jallieu
- Intercommunality: CA Porte de l'Isère

Government
  - Mayor (2020–2026): Vincent Chriqui
- Area^{1}: 24.37 km^{2} (9.41 sq mi)
- Elevation: 254 m (833 ft)
- Population (2023): 30,151
  - Density: 1,237/km^{2} (3,204/sq mi)
- Time zone: UTC+01:00 (CET)
  - Summer (DST): UTC+02:00 (CEST)
- INSEE/Postal code: 38053 /38300
- ^{1} French Land Register data, which excludes lakes, ponds, glaciers > 1 km^{2} (0.386 sq mi or 247 acres) and river estuaries.

Bourgoin-Jallieu (French pronunciation: [buʁɡwɛ̃ ʒaljø]; Arpitan: Brégon) is a commune in the Isère department in the region of Auvergne-Rhône-Alpes in France. The commune had 30,151 inhabitants in 2023 and lies 35 kilometres east-southeast of Lyon. It was formed by the merger of the former communes Bourgoin and Jallieu in 1965.

== History ==
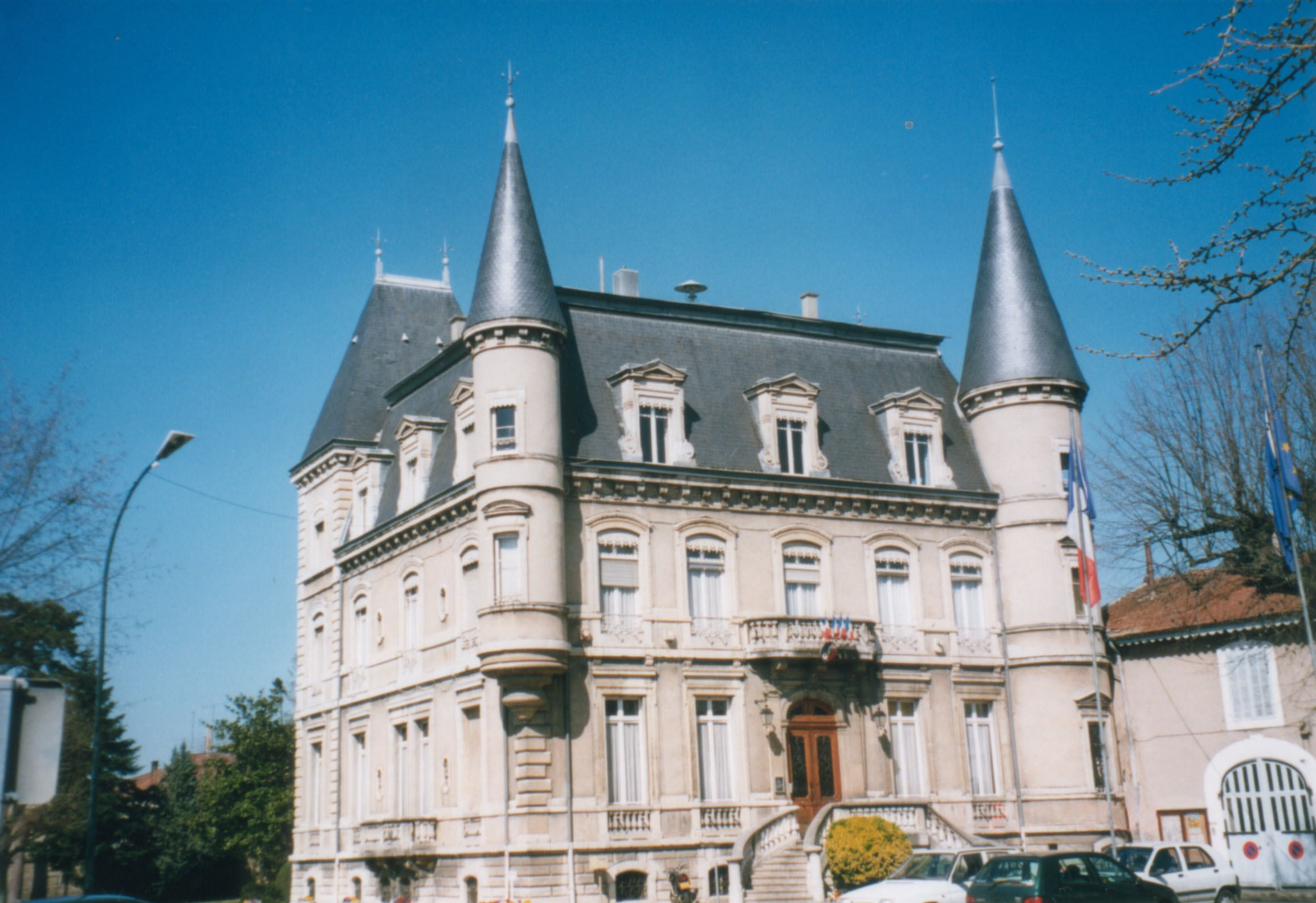
The Hôtel de Ville

The Hôtel de Ville was built as a private residence and completed in around 1870.

== Geography ==
Bourgoin is located 32 km from Lyon, 17 km from St Priest, the first suburb and 70 km from Grenoble. The town is next to the new town of l'Isle-d'Abeau and Saint-Exupéry International Airport.

The Bourbre flows northwest through the commune and crosses the town.

Neighbourhoods in the municipality include:

- Champfleuri
- Funas
- Champaret
- Boussieu
- La Grive
- Montbernier
- Planbourgoin
- Pré-Bénit
- Mozas
- l'Oiselet

== Population ==
Bourgoin-Jallieu has a population of about 28,000. The population data given in the table and graph below for 1962 and earlier refer to the former commune of Bourgoin. A small town of about 3,500 inhabitants around 1800 and 7,000 around 1900, its population has rapidly increased since the 1960s. Its inhabitants are called Berjalliens.

Historical population

Year	Pop.	±% p.a.
1793	3,368	—
1800	3,595	+0.94%
1806	3,620	+0.12%
1821	3,780	+0.29%
1831	3,672	−0.29%
1836	4,235	+2.89%
1841	4,271	+0.17%
1846	4,394	+0.57%
1851	4,749	+1.57%
1856	4,400	−1.51%
1861	4,851	+1.97%
1866	4,853	+0.01%
1872	4,954	+0.34%
1876	5,021	+0.34%
1881	6,138	+4.10%
1886	6,345	+0.67%
1891	7,217	+2.61%
1896	6,659	−1.60%
1901	7,279	+1.80%

Year	Pop.	±% p.a.
1906	7,163	−0.32%
1911	6,790	−1.06%
1921	6,162	−0.97%
1926	7,241	+3.28%
1931	8,020	+2.06%
1936	7,465	−1.42%
1946	7,699	+0.31%
1954	8,153	+0.72%
1962	9,240	+1.58%
1968	19,941	+13.68%
1975	21,971	+1.39%
1982	22,550	+0.37%
1990	22,392	−0.09%
1999	22,947	+0.27%
2007	23,759	+0.44%
2012	26,773	+2.42%
2017	28,387	+1.18%
2023	30,151	+1.01%

Source: EHESS and INSEE (1968–2023)

== Personalities ==
- Jean-Pierre Andrevon, science fiction author
- Brahim Asloum, world boxing champion and Olympic gold medallist
- Julien Bonnaire, rugby union player
- Frédéric Dard, writer
- Marc Cécillon, French rugby union player
- Simon Gachet, racing driver
- Claudie Gallay, writer
- Yvon Gattaz, businessman
- Stéphane Glas, rugby union player
- Amine Gouiri, footballer
- Seyhan Kurt, poet, writer
- Fabien Michal, racing driver
- Kévin Monnet-Paquet, footballer
- Timothé Nadim, anti-bullying activist
- Marcelle Pardé, resistance member
- Guy Savoy, chef

== Sport ==
Bourgoin-Jallieu is home to the professional rugby union club CS Bourgoin-Jallieu, which competes in the French third division.

FC Bourgoin-Jallieu (fr) is the local association football team.

Both the football and the rugby clubs play at the Stade Pierre Rajon.

The 19th stage of the 2009 Tour de France ran through the town.

== International relations ==
Bourgoin-Jallieu is twinned with:

- Bergisch Gladbach, Germany
- Conselice, Italy
- Dunstable, England, United Kingdom
- Rehau, Germany
- Velsen, Netherlands
- Wujiang (Suzhou), China

== Culture ==
=== Gastronomy ===
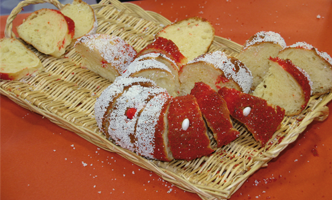
La Brioche de Bourgoin

Besides from being located in a region benefiting from the prestige of Lyon's gastronomy, Bourgoin-Jallieu is also the birthplace of chef Guy Savoy. Some of the most famous dishes of the city are the following:

- chaudelets
- brioche de Bourgoin
- Isernoix
- San-Antonio chocolate
- Grande Dauphine
- Galet du Bion
- La Grise de Bazas

=== Literature ===
Bourgoin-Jallieu is the birthplace of Frédéric Dard, writer of the San-Antonio book series.

== Climate ==
Climate data for Bourgoin-Jallieu, elevation 358 m (1,175 ft), (2003–2020 normals, extremes 2003–present)
Month	Jan	Feb	Mar	Apr	May	Jun	Jul	Aug	Sep	Oct	Nov	Dec	Year
Record high °C (°F)	20.0 (68.0)	21.1 (70.0)	24.7 (76.5)	29.1 (84.4)	32.6 (90.7)	36.5 (97.7)	39.0 (102.2)	40.0 (104.0)	33.8 (92.8)	29.8 (85.6)	22.6 (72.7)	18.1 (64.6)	40.0 (104.0)
Mean daily maximum °C (°F)	6.3 (43.3)	7.8 (46.0)	12.4 (54.3)	17.2 (63.0)	20.4 (68.7)	24.9 (76.8)	27.6 (81.7)	26.9 (80.4)	22.6 (72.7)	17.1 (62.8)	11.1 (52.0)	7.0 (44.6)	16.8 (62.2)
Daily mean °C (°F)	3.6 (38.5)	4.4 (39.9)	8.1 (46.6)	12.3 (54.1)	15.4 (59.7)	19.5 (67.1)	21.8 (71.2)	21.3 (70.3)	17.5 (63.5)	13.2 (55.8)	8.0 (46.4)	4.2 (39.6)	12.4 (54.3)
Mean daily minimum °C (°F)	0.8 (33.4)	0.9 (33.6)	3.8 (38.8)	7.3 (45.1)	10.4 (50.7)	14.1 (57.4)	16.0 (60.8)	15.7 (60.3)	12.4 (54.3)	9.3 (48.7)	4.8 (40.6)	1.4 (34.5)	8.1 (46.6)
Record low °C (°F)	−10.3 (13.5)	−14.2 (6.4)	−10.6 (12.9)	−1.8 (28.8)	1.5 (34.7)	4.5 (40.1)	9.0 (48.2)	8.3 (46.9)	3.9 (39.0)	−3.0 (26.6)	−6.0 (21.2)	−13.3 (8.1)	−14.2 (6.4)
Average precipitation mm (inches)	61.1 (2.41)	48.7 (1.92)	57.6 (2.27)	61.1 (2.41)	81.8 (3.22)	68.8 (2.71)	73.5 (2.89)	78.4 (3.09)	64.0 (2.52)	97.1 (3.82)	86.8 (3.42)	65.1 (2.56)	844.0 (33.23)
Average precipitation days (≥ 1.0 mm)	9.9	7.9	9.8	7.8	10.2	7.6	6.9	7.7	6.3	8.7	8.8	10.2	101.7
Source: Meteociel

== See also ==
- CS Bourgoin-Jallieu
