= Janice Hally =

Scottish playwright and screenwriter (born 1959)

- Born: 18 March 1959 (age 67); Glasgow, Scotland
- Occupations: Playwright, Screenwriter, Novelist
- Spouse: Peter May
- Writing career
- Period: 1980–present
- Genre: Television drama
- Notable works: Machair, Take the High Road
- Notable awards: ISPC; 1980 best unperformed script
- Website: www.janicehally.com

Janice Hally (born 18 March 1959) is a Scottish playwright and television screenwriter who has written more than 300 broadcast hours of prime-time British television drama serials and individual screenplays. She was co-creator and main screenwriter on the first-ever, long-running Gaelic drama serial Machair.

== Biography ==
Hally was born in Glasgow and educated at Hillhead High School and the University of Glasgow where she studied Drama and English Literature. In 1980, the year that she graduated, she won the World Student Drama Trust ISPC award, judged by Alan Ayckbourn for her play Ready or Not. Ready or Not was subsequently performed professionally at the Tron Theatre in Glasgow.

The play was then adapted for television and led to her nomination, at the age of 23, in the category of 'Best New Writer to Television' at the 1982 PYE television awards.

From then on, she wrote single plays, children's drama and serial drama for television, garnering more than 650 credits as creator, screenwriter, script editor, storyliner.

During the 1980s, Hally wrote scripts for the Scottish television series Take The High Road, before becoming associate script editor, then storyliner for the show, where she worked as part of an editorial team with Peter May and Tom Wright. During this period Take The High Road achieved its highest audience figures, topping the ratings in Scotland and being broadcast across Britain. May and Hally quit the show in 1989 and were married in 1990.

The couple co-created the Gaelic television drama serial Machair in the early 1990s and spent most of that decade on location in the Outer Hebrides making 99 episodes of the Gaelic television drama serial.

Early in the new millennium, they set up home in France where May writes thrillers and Hally has written fiction and non-fiction books.

== Machair ==
May and Hally took two years researching not only stories, but locations, production staff and actors before presenting their proposal for the first ever long-running Gaelic drama serial to Scottish Television. May went on to produce the show, leading a cast and crew to the remote Outer Hebrides to shoot the series on location while Hally wrote the stories and the episode outlines of 99 episodes. Hally shared the writing of scripts with fellow Scottish playwright and script writer, Ann Marie Di Mambro. The scripts were written in English before being translated into Gaelic. The show was anticipated with derision by a sceptical press, but after the first episode was broadcast during peak viewing time, Kenneth Roy, television critic of Scotland on Sunday, described it as "a credit to the company (Scottish Television) and a smack in the face to those of us who were doubtful" and after a few episodes he revised his opinion, saying "it is even better than it looked at first glance quite simply the best thing to have happened to television in Scotland for a long time".

Viewers agreed, and the show managed to get a 30% audience share, making it into the Top Ten of programmes viewed in Scotland. With fewer than 2% of the Scottish population able to speak Gaelic, the vast majority of viewers were dependent on the shows subtitles. It was nominated for awards for production and writing from The Celtic Film Festival and Writers Guild of Great Britain

== Writing ==
- Ask No Questions (2011), novella, Editions Didier Hachette (publishers, Paris, France)
- The Killing Room (Les Disparues), feature film screenplay with Peter May, scheduled for production January 2012 with The French Connection (French film production company)
- Distant Echo (2010), novella, Editions Didier Hachette (publishers, Paris, France)
- The Firemaker (2008), feature film screenplay treatment, KUIV (French film production company).
- Modelling and Acting for Kids (2004), non-fiction book, A&C Black (publishers, London, UK)
- Looking for the Zee (2002), novel, Miramont Media (publishers, California USA)
- Machair (1990–1996) drama serial, Scottish Television. Co-Creator, storylined and script edited the first 99 episodes, and wrote the scripts for more than 50 episodes.
- Take The High Road (1983–1989), drama serial, Scottish Television. Screenwriter and Story Editor. Wrote more than 50 episodes, Associate Script Editor on 208 episodes, storyliner of 240 episodes
- Private Eye (1985), individual screenplay, ITV (Dramarama)
- My Mum's A Courgette (1984), individual screenplay, ITV (Dramarama)
- D'You Get Paid For Doing This? (1983), individual screenplay, Scottish Television
- Ladies First (1983), individual screenplay, Scottish Television & Channel Four
- Ready Or Not (1982), individual screenplay, Scottish Television
- Ready Or Not (1982), theatre play, Tron Theatre, Glasgow
