= Marie-Anne Frison-Roche =

French economist

Marie-Anne Frison-Roche (born 2 August 1959 in Bar-le-Duc (Lorraine), France) is a professor of Economic Law at the Institut d’Etudes Politiques de Paris. She is a specialist in Regulatory Law, whose doctrine she founded in France.

== Studies ==
Her studies notably consisted of a Bachelor's degree in Philosophy at the Université de la Sorbonne (Paris IV) in 1987, a Master of Advanced Studies (DEA) in Private Law at Université Pantheon Sorbonne (Paris I) in 1984, a Master of Advanced Studies (DEA) in Procedural Law at Panthéon-Assas University in 1983, and a State Doctorate in Private Law, which she obtained after defending a thesis entitled Generalities on the Adversarial Principle at Panthéon-Assas University in 1988. Her studies culminated with the first place in the Agrégation of Private Law in 1991.

== Professional career ==
Following her studies, she successively occupied Professorial positions at the University of Angers, Université Paris-Dauphine, and Sciences-Po (Paris). She founded a Master of Advanced Studies (DESS) in Economic Law at each of these establishments.

Within Sciences-Po, she founded the Chaire Régulation in 2000, which is a structure for performing research and organising events, and directed it until 2009. Her research goals have been developed throughout her various responsibilities in education, publication, and consulting for governments and private businesses: she has established a theoretical position based on law, economics, and politics, on the rules and decisions characteristic of regulated sectors (such as telecommunications, transports, media, Internet, energy, finance, banking, insurance, healthcare, and the environment). When she arrived at Sciences-Po in 2001, she founded the Master in Economic Law, which she directed until 2009. She founded the Journal of Regulation published in paper format and on the Internet. She created two editorial collections, Cours Dalloz published by Dalloz, and Droit et Economie (Law and Economics) published by LGDJ. She created her own publishing house, MAFR Publishing, in 2010.

== Publications, Speaking Engagements, Research Interests ==
Marie-Anne Frison-Roche has written about fifteen books, edited about forty, and written about 250 articles and monographs. A large part of her work is available on her website.

From a qualitative point of view, her main area of expertise is regulation. In 2000, she wrote the seminal articles on what has since come to be known as "Regulatory Law" and participated in the implementation, both in France and abroad, of successful and effective economic regulation of various sectors. She wrote the major reference works concerning regulation in France, especially Les 100 mots de la régulation (in press) and the Précis Dalloz du droit de la régulation (forthcoming). She approaches regulation from the triple angle of Law, economics, and political science. Many French and foreign regulators call upon her to draw up reports and studies. The publication she founded, The Journal of Regulation is sponsored by more than forty corporate partners and all of France's specialized regulators are members of its Global Committee. It is widely believed that Marie-Anne Frison-Roche is the reference in terms of directly applicable doctrine in Regulation.

She continues her work on the role of States in global economic regulation, and publishes legal sociology articles, drawing especially on her experience at the laboratoire de sociologie juridique of Panthéon-Assas University, founded by Jean Carbonnier, which she directed for many years.
