= Tiffany McDaniel =

American author

Tiffany McDaniel (born in 1985) is an American author from Ohio Appalachia. She is of Cherokee heritage. She started writing as a child. As a self-taught author with no formal education, McDaniel wrote several unpublished pieces before her first publication in 2016. Her novels The Summer That Melted Everything (2016, St. Martin's Press, Macmillan), Betty (2020, Knopf, Penguin Random House) are set in the fictional town of Breathed, Ohio. Betty, which Oprah magazine called “Sumptuous and intimate," and Glamour said was a “Gorgeous. . . coming of age narrative" is an International Bestseller published by Penguin Random House. The book was also longlisted for the Dublin Literary Award and was the winner of the Friends of American Writers In 2021, it was reported that Paramount Television Studios would be adapting the novel with Jessica Biel attached to star and produce. Tiffany's third published novel On the Savage Side (2023, Knopf, Penguin Random House) was called "exceptionally inventive" by the New York Times and received starred reviews from both Library Journal and Publisher's Weekly. The novel takes place in Chillicothe, Ohio. The author dedicates her novel to the six victims of the unsolved murder and disappearance cases in this city between 2013 and 2015. Tiffany is also the author of the Middle Grade fantasy series, The Wand Keepers, published by Simon & Schuster. The series includes Book 1, A Sky Full of Dragons and Book 2, The Mummy Snatcher Curse. Tiffany McDaniel is a winner of several international literary prizes including the Prix du Roman Fnac in 2020. She was named a Knight of the Order of Arts and Letters and awarded the Ordre des Arts et des Lettres by the Minister of Culture in France in July 2021.
