= Mark Gallay =

Soviet test pilot

- Марк Лазаревич Галлай
- Born: 16 April [O.S. 3 April] 1914; Saint Petersburg, Russian Empire
- Died: 14 July 1998; Moscow, Russian Federation
- Military career
- Allegiance: Soviet Union
- Branch: Soviet Air Force
- Service years: 1941–1958
- Rank: Colonel
- Conflicts: World War II
- Awards: Hero of the Soviet Union; Honoured Test Pilot of the USSR

Mark Lazarevich Gallay (Russian: Марк Лазаревич Галлай; 16 April [O.S. 3 April] 1914 — 14 July 1998) was a Soviet test pilot, World War II veteran, and Hero of the Soviet Union.

== Early life ==
Gallay was born on 16 April [O.S. 3 April] 1914 to a Jewish family in Saint Petersburg. His father Lazar Moiseevich Gallay was an engineer, and his mother Zinaida Alekzandrovna Gallay née Levinson was an actress. His uncle Oskar Gallay was a film director. After completing secondary school when he was sixteen, he started working as a turner at the Krasny Oktyabr plant. From 1932 to 1935 he studied at the Leningrad Institute of Engineers of the Civil Air Fleet. In 1935 he attended the Leningrad aeroclub, where he practiced parachuting and flying gliders, and after graduating from initial training in 1936 he worked as a parachuting instructor there. From 1935 to 1937 he studied at the Leningrad Polytechnic Institute, where he graduated in 1937. After graduating he worked as an engineer at the Central Aerohydrodynamic Institute, where he also attended training to become a test pilot, graduating later that year. After becoming a test pilot, he participated in test flights on the Tupolev SB, Yer-2, UPO-22. During one test flight of the SB bomber he encountered a birdstrike, causing him to hit his head and losing consciousness before managing to land the plane safety. In 1941 he starting working for the Gromov Flight Research Institute, but soon left test pilot work due to World War II.

== Combat ==
As a test pilot based in Moscow, Gallay was part of the 2nd Separate Fighter Air Squadron of Moscow Air Defense Forces. On the night of 21 July 1941, he flew in a sortie with other Moscow pilots to intercept the first Luftwaffe attack on Moscow, where he shot down a Dornier Do 17 of Kampfgeschwader 3 piloted by Kurt Kuhn while piloting a MiG-3. While Kuhn was able to fly as far as Vitebsk in his damaged bomber, he was forced to land in Soviet territory, and all four crew members were captured. For the feat he was awarded the Order of the Red Banner. From July to September 1941 Gallay totaled ten night sorties on the MiG-3 but gained no further aerial victories. However, he did continue to fly in combat, flying the Petlyakov Pe-2 as a deputy squadron commander in the 128th Bomber Aviation Regiment.

In 1942 he returned to working at the Gromov Flight Research Institute in 1942, he starting working on test flights for modifications of the Pe-2. He also flew test flights of the Shvetsov ASh-82 engine on the La-5, and in 1944 he participated in tests of an experimental wing design for the Yak-7 fighter, as well as more tests on Pe-2VI. He also flew in combat on the Pe-2, making 28 sorties on it before moving on to the Pe-8, which he made his first sortie on in May 1943 as a co-pilot in the 890th Long-range Aviation Regiment. However, he made only seven sorties on the plane, as he was shot down on 9 June 1943 and forced to bail out over enemy territory. After making contact with the Rognedinsky partisan brigade in the Brynask oblast he was rescued and taken back to Soviet territory, where he returned to working as a test pilot.

== Postwar ==
After the end of World War II he piloted tests on a Me 163 that had been captured from the Nazi military. He also flew tests on the MiG-9, at the time designated as the I-300, in 1946. During one test flight he experienced a close call when his plane went into a sharp dive after it hit compressibility, but by grabbing back the throttles he managed to pull out of the dive. From 1947 to 1949 he worked on tests of the Tupolev Tu-4, as well as tests of the I-215 in 1948 followed by tests of the Yak-20 in 1950. However he was fired from the Gromov Flight Research Institute later that year as result of the anti-cosmopolitan campaign. After being out of work for about a month he managed to find a new job at the NII-17, which tested onboard equipment. There, Gallay conducted tests of new radar systems on Li-2, V-25, MiG-15, I-320, La-200, Yak-25, and other aircraft. In 1955 he started working as a test pilot of OKB-23, headed by Vladimir Myasishchev, where he made the maiden flight of the 3M on 27 March 1956 and flew tests on the M-4. For his courage in test pilot work he was awarded the title Hero of the Soviet Union on 1 May 1957. The subsequent year he transferred to the reserve with the rank of colonel and returned to working at the Gromov Flight Research Institute as a senior researcher until 1975, and from 1960 to 1961 he worked on the cosmonaut training program, where he participated in the training of the Vostok cosmonauts.

In 1959 Gallay became deputy chairman of the methodological council of the Ministry of Aviation Industry for test flights and assisted in preparation of test flights for new aircraft, including the Tu-144, Tu-154, Il-62, Il-76, and An-22, authoring many scientific papers and receiving his doctorate of Technical Sciences in 1972. A member of the Union of Writers of the USSR, he wrote many memoirs about work as a test pilot as well as biographies of other famous test pilots. He lived in Moscow, where he died on 14 July 1998 and was buried in the Troyekurovskoye Cemetery.

There is a memorial plaque on the house where he lived in Moscow and a minor planet is named in his honor.

== Awards ==
- Hero of the Soviet Union (1 May 1957)
- Honoured Test Pilot of the USSR (17 February 1959)
- Three Order of Lenin (29 April 1944, 20 September 1947, 1 May 1957)
- Four Order of the Red Banner (24 July 1941, 13 June 1942, 19 August 1944, 5 February 1947)
- Two Order of the Patriotic War 1st class (16 September 1945 and 11 March 1985)
- Order of the Red Star (31 July 1948)
- Order of the Badge of Honour (13 April 1984)
- campaign and jubilee medals

== Literature ==
- Balakov, Igor; Simonov, Andrey (1999). Испытатели МиГов (in Russian). Zhukovsky: Авиационный Печатный Двор. ISBN 5-93705-001-0.
- Vasin, Valentin; Simonov, Andrey (2001). Испытатели ЛИИ (in Russian). Zhukovsky: Авиационный Печатный Двор.
- Simonov, Andrey (2015). Заслуженные испытатели СССР (in Russian) (2 ed.). Moscow: Фонд «Русские витязи».
