= Peter May (writer) =

Scottish writer (1951–2026)

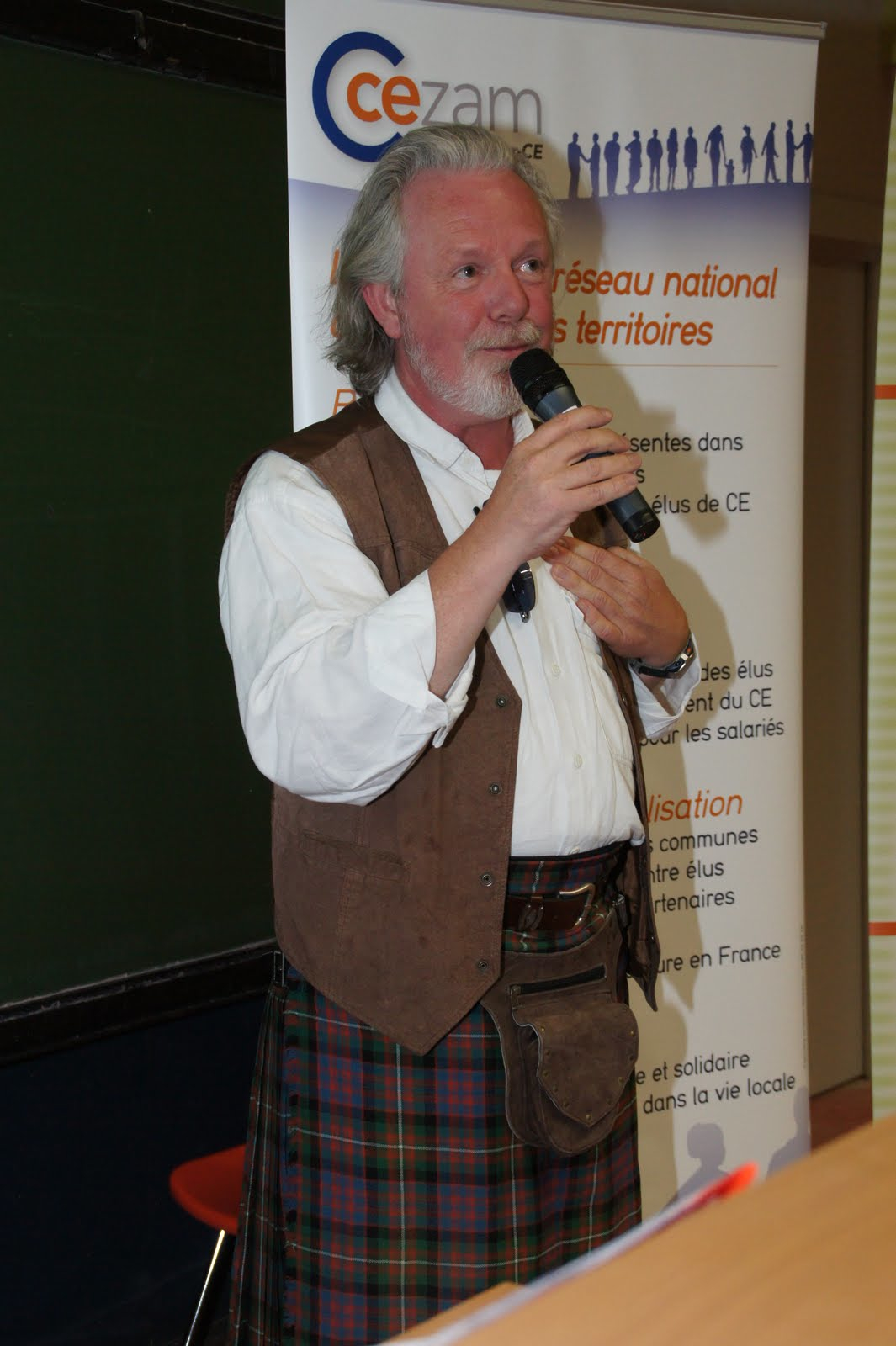
- May receiving the Prix Cezam Literature Award in Strasbourg, France, in 2011
- Born: 20 December 1951; Glasgow, Scotland
- Died: 25 September 2026 (aged 74); Gassin, Var, France
- Occupations: Crime writer, screenwriter, novelist
- Spouse: Janice Hally
- Writing career
- Period: 1971–2026
- Genres: Television drama, Thriller, Mystery, Crime Fiction
- Subjects: Scotland, China, France
- Notable works: The Lewis Trilogy, The China Thrillers, The Enzo Files
- Notable awards: Fraser Award; 1973 Scottish Young Journalist of the Year Prix Intramuros; 2007 Snakehead Cezam Prix Littéraire Inter CE; 2011 The Blackhouse
- Website: petermay.co.uk

Peter Marr May (20 December 1951 – 25 September 2026) was a Scottish television screenwriter, novelist and crime writer. He was the recipient of writing awards in Europe and America. The Blackhouse won the U.S. Barry Award for Crime Novel of the Year and the national literature award in France, the Cezam Prix Litteraire. The Lewis Man won the French daily newspaper Le Télégramme's 10,000-euro Grand Prix des Lecteurs. In 2014, Entry Island won both the Deanston's Scottish Crime Novel of the Year and the UK's ITV Crime Thriller Book Club Best Read of the Year Award. May's books have sold more than twelve million copies worldwide. In 2025 May was awarded France's Grand Prix de Littérature Policière.

== Early life ==
Peter May was born in Glasgow on 20 December 1951 and grew up in Clarkston, Scotland. From an early age he was intent on becoming a novelist, but took up a career as a journalist as a way to start earning a living by writing. He made his first serious attempt at writing a novel at the age of 19, which he sent to Collins where it was read by Philip Ziegler, who wrote him a very encouraging rejection letter. At the age of 21, he won the Fraser Award and was named Scotland's Young Journalist of the Year. He went on to write for The Scotsman and the Glasgow Evening Times. When May was 26, his first novel, The Reporter, was published. He was asked to adapt the book as a television series for the British television network the BBC and left journalism in 1978 to begin to write full-time for television.

== Television career ==
May's novel The Reporter became the prime-time 13-part television series entitled The Standard in 1978. May went on to create another major TV series for the BBC, Squadron, a drama involving an RAF rapid deployment squadron. In the following fifteen years, May earned more than 1,000 TV credits. He created and wrote major drama serials for both BBC and the Independent Television Network in the UK including Machair which he co-created with Janice Hally for Scottish Television. The long-running serial was the first major television drama to be made in the Gaelic language and was shot entirely on the Isle of Lewis in the Outer Hebrides. The show, which May also produced, achieved a 33% audience share and regularly appeared in the top ten in the ratings in Scotland, in spite of the fact that it was broadcast with English subtitles because only 2% of the population of Scotland are Gaelic speakers. During his time working in television, May wrote the novels Hidden Faces (1981) and The Noble Path (1992), and in 1996 he quit television to write novels.

== Novel writing career ==
=== China ===
After quitting television May wrote a series of six novels known as the China Thrillers. To research the series, May made annual trips to China and built up a network of contacts including forensic pathologists and homicide detectives. He gained access to the homicide and forensic science sections of Beijing and Shanghai police forces and has made a study of the methodology of Chinese police and forensic pathology systems.

As a mark of their respect for his work, the Chinese Crime Writers' Association made him an honorary member of their Beijing Chapter. He is the only Westerner to receive this honour. He has also contributed a monthly column to the Chinese Police Magazine Contemporary World Police.

The books were first published in the UK between 1999 and 2004 and subsequently published worldwide in translation. New editions were published for the United States and UK in 2016/17 with an introduction by May explaining the historical setting of the books.

=== France ===
May lived in France and his China Thrillers have received several nominations for awards in that country. In 2007 he won the Prix Intramuros. This prize is unique in France as it is awarded by juries of readers made up of prisoners in French penitentiaries. The books under consideration are reduced to a shortlist of 6 finalists and the authors of the shortlisted books then have to travel to various French prisons to be interviewed by panels of detainees. In 2007, May was the only non-French author in the shortlist. He received the prize at the annual Polar&Co literary festival in Cognac.

The Enzo Files is set in France and is centred on the work of half-Italian, half-Scottish Enzo Macleod. This former forensic scientist, now working as a biology professor at a French university becomes involved in applying the latest scientific methods to solve cold cases.

He tried to ensure authenticity in the details of his books by researching in France just as he did in China. When writing The Critic – which involves the wine industry and is set in Gaillac, France – May took a course in wine-tasting, picked grapes by hand, and was invited by the winemakers of the region to be inducted as a Chevalier de la Dive Bouteille de Gaillac in December 2007.

In April 2016, after 15 years of living full-time in France and a connection with the department of the Lot that goes back more than 40 years, May was welcomed as a French citizen at a ceremony of naturalisation by Catherine Ferrier, the Préfète of the Lot.

=== Second Life ===
While working on his standalone thriller Virtually Dead, May researched the book by creating an avatar in the online world of Second Life and opening the Flick Faulds private detective agency. He spent a year in Second Life, working as a private detective, and was hired by clients for cases ranging from protection from harassment by stalkers to surveillance and infidelity investigations.

=== The Lewis Trilogy ===
After being turned down by all the major British publishers, The Blackhouse, the first book in 'The Lewis Trilogy', was published first in May's adopted home of France in French translation at the end of 2009. The book was hailed as "a masterpiece" by the French daily newspaper L'Humanité and was immediately nominated for several literary awards in France. It won the Prix des Lecteurs at Le Havre's Ancres Noires Festival in 2010 and won the French national literature award, the Cezam Prix Littéraire Inter CE at an award ceremony in Strasbourg in October 2011. The Blackhouse went on to be published all over Europe and was bought by British publishers Quercus who brought it out in February 2011. It is the first of, originally, three books to be set in the Outer Hebrides, an archipelago off the North West coast of Scotland.

The Blackhouse was chosen for the Richard & Judy Book Club autumn 2011 list.

The second book in the trilogy, The Lewis Man, was published in January 2012, and spent 18 weeks in the UK hardbacks best sellers' list. It has won two French literature awards, the Prix des Lecteurs at Le Havre's Ancres Noires Festival, 2012 and the Prix des Lecteurs du Télégramme, readers prize of France's Le Télégramme newspaper; the 10,000 euro award was presented to May at a ceremony in Brest in May 2012.

The Lewis Man won the 2012 Prix International at the Cognac Festival.

The third book in the trilogy, The Chessmen, was published in January 2013. It was shortlisted for the Theakstons Old Peculier Crime Book of the Year 2014. The Lewis Trilogy has sold more than a million copies in the UK alone.

In 2024, a fourth book, described as a follow-on to the original trilogy, The Black Loch, was published. This book is set ten years later than The Chessmen, the same as the interval between publication of the books.

=== Standalone novels ===
Entry Island, Peter May's first book after the Lewis Trilogy, won the Deanstons Scottish Crime Book of the Year 2014, the UK national prize, the Specsavers ITV Crime Thriller Book Club Best Read of the Year 2014 and the French Trophée 813 for the Best Foreign Crime Novel of the year 2015. The book is partly set on a remote island in modern-day Canada and partly set on the Isle of Lewis 150 years earlier during the Highland Clearances.

Runaway is a crime novel based on Peter May's real experiences of running away from home in Glasgow seeking fame and fortune in London with members of a musical group that he was part of in the 1960s. The story is told through two storylines, one in 1965 in which five teenagers embark on a trip that ends with tragic consequences, and the other in 2015, where three of the men retrace their steps from Scotland to London fifty years later in order to solve a murder.

Published in the UK in 2016, Coffin Road is a standalone thriller set on the Isle of Harris. The story has an ecological theme involving links between big pharmaceutical companies and colony collapse disorder in bees. Although it is not a follow-up to May's Lewis Trilogy, the character of George Gunn, a policeman in the Lewis Trilogy, features as a policeman in Coffin Road.

I'll Keep You Safe (published in the UK in 2018) opens in Paris, France, but the action quickly transfers to the Western Isles of Scotland. A thriller tangentially related to the world of high fashion, it features characters engaged in the rural production of hand-woven fabric similar to Harris tweed.

A Silent Death, published in the UK in 2020, is a police thriller set in Andalusia, Spain, and Gibraltar. Its action involves the criminal background to the Costa del Sol and features a Scottish policeman on the trail of a Scottish drug lord.

Lockdown was also published worldwide in 2020 although it was written 15 years earlier. The story takes place in the city of London during a lockdown resulting from a global pandemic. May stated that the book was not published at the time because British editors thought the idea of London under siege from a virus "was unrealistic and could never happen".

== Death ==
May died in Gassin, Var, France, on 25 September 2026, aged 74.

== Books, television and film writing credits ==
=== The Lewis Trilogy ===
- The Blackhouse (Quercus 2011)
- The Lewis Man (Quercus, 2012)
- The Chessmen (Quercus, 2013)

Follow-up to the Lewis Trilogy

- The Black Loch (Riverrun 2024)

=== The Enzo Files ===
- Extraordinary People (published in United States as Dry Bones by Poisoned Pen Press 2006), (Quercus, 2013)
- The Critic (published in United States as A Vintage Corpse by Poisoned Pen Press, 2007), (Quercus, 2013)
- Blacklight Blue (Poisoned Pen Press, 2008, Quercus 2013)
- Freeze Frame (Poisoned Pen Press, 2010, Quercus, 2013)
- Blowback (Poisoned Pen Press, 2011, Quercus, 2013)
- Cast Iron (Riverrun, 2017)
- The Night Gate (Riverrun, 2021)

=== The China Thrillers ===
- The Firemaker (Hodder & Stoughton 1999), (St. Martin's Press 2005), (Poisoned Pen Press 2008), (Quercus E-books 2012), (Riverrun 2016)
- The Fourth Sacrifice (Hodder & Stoughton 2000), (St Martin's Press 2007) (Poisoned Pen Press 2008), (Quercus E-books 2012), (Riverrun 2016)
- The Killing Room (Hodder & Stoughton 2001), (St Martin's Press 2008) (Poisoned Pen Press 2009), (Quercus E-books 2012), (Riverrun 2016)
- Snakehead (Hodder & Stoughton 2002), (Poisoned Pen Press 2009), (Quercus E-books 2012), (Riverrun 2017)
- The Runner (Hodder & Stoughton 2003), (Poisoned Pen Press 2010), (Quercus E-books 2012), (Riverrun 2017)
- Chinese Whispers (Hodder & Stoughton 2004), (Poisoned Pen Press 2009), (Quercus Quercus E-books 2012), (Riverrun 2017)
- The Ghost Marriage (Éditions Didier 2010), (Quercus 2017)

=== Standalone novels ===
- The Reporter (Corgi, 1978)
- Fallen Hero (NEL, 1979)
- Hidden Faces (Piatkus 1981), published as The Man With No Face (St Martin's Press 1982), (Riverrun 2019)
- The Noble Path (Piatkus 1992), (St Martin's Press 1993), (Riverrun 2019)
- Virtually Dead (Poisoned Pen Press 2010)
- Entry Island (Quercus 2014)
- Runaway (Quercus 2015)
- Coffin Road (Quercus 2016)
- I'll Keep You Safe (Riverrun 2018)
- A Silent Death (Riverrun 2020)
- Lockdown (Riverrun 2020)
- A Winter Grave (Riverrun 2023)

=== Photo books ===
- Hebrides (Quercus 2013) Photo companion to The Lewis Trilogy, with photographs by David Wilson.

=== Television drama ===
- The Standard (BBC 1978) (13 episodes) creator, writer
- Squadron (BBC 1982) (10 episodes) co-creator, writer
- Take the High Road (Scottish Television 1980 – 1992) writer (200+ episodes), story & script editor (700+ episodes).
- The Ardlamont Mystery (BBC 1985) (Single drama) writer.
- Machair (Scottish Television 1992–96) (99 episodes) co-creator and producer.

=== Television guidebooks ===
- The Road to Glendarroch (Devonfire Books 2026) Shortly before his death, May contributed the Foreword to this guidebook to Take the High Road, written by TV historian Patrick Stratford.

=== Film ===
- The Killing Room (Les Disparues de Shanghai) movie, based on May’s China Series novel of that name, was to be produced by French production company, French Connection in partnership with Korean Dream Capture Studios Action was transferred from Shanghai, China to Seoul, South Korea. It was released as a movie entitled Vanishing, starring Olga Kurylenko, with its World Premiere at Busan International Film Festival on October 7th, 2021.

== Awards and honours ==
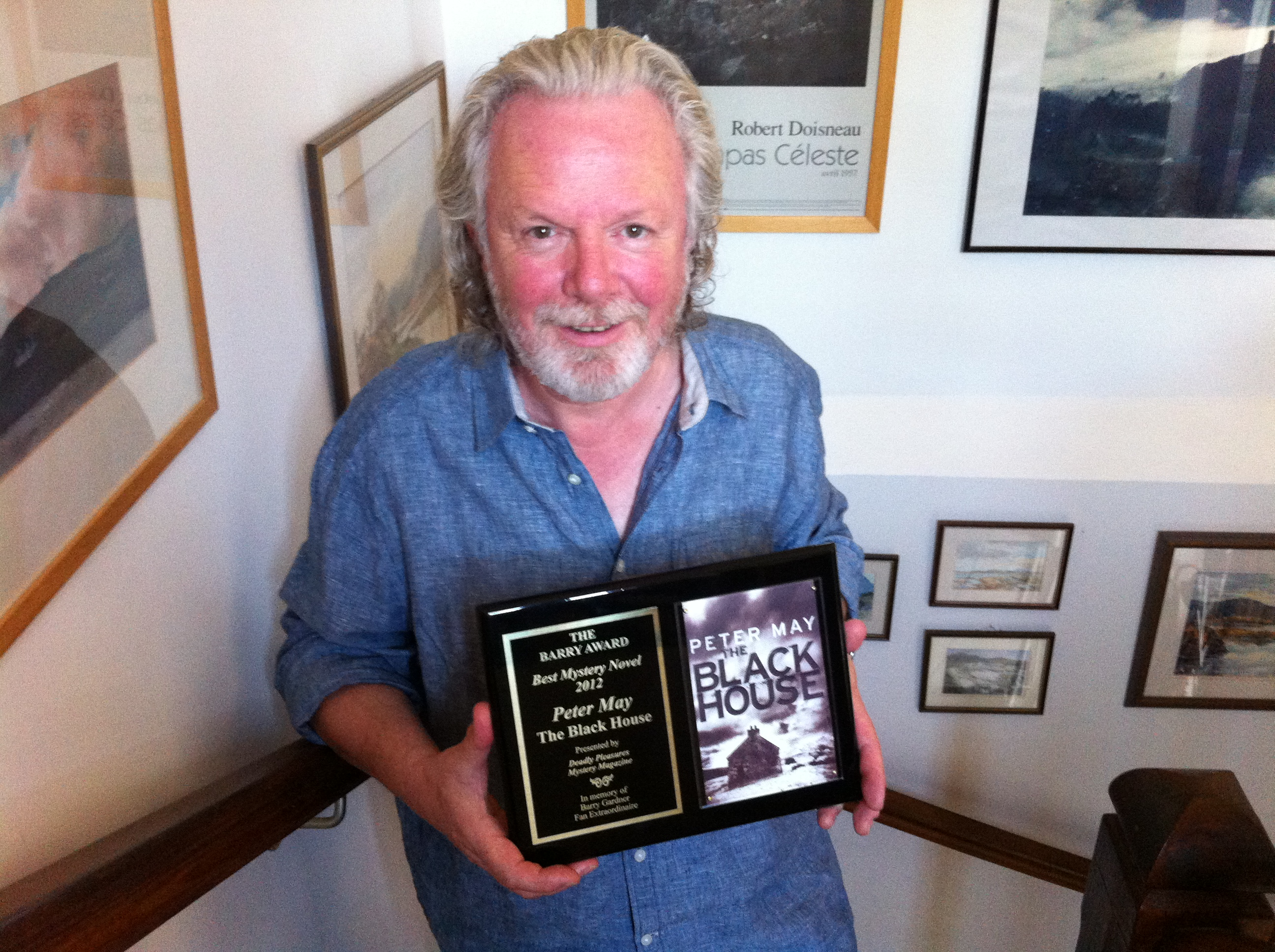
Author Peter May with the 2013 Barry Award for Best Novel, for The Blackhouse.

- Fraser Award (1973) winner of Scottish Young Journalist of the Year Award
- 17th International Celtic Film and Television Festival (1996) Machair nominated for Best Drama Serial Award
- Elle Magazine, Grand Prix de Littérature (2006) The Firemaker runner up in category Best Crime Novel
- 2007 Prix Intramuros (France) Snakehead winner at the Salon Polar & Co, Cognac
- 2007 Prix International (France) Snakehead shortlisted at the Salon Polar & Co, Cognac
- 2008 Prix International (France) Chinese Whispers shortlisted at the Salon Polar & Co, Cognac
- 2010 Prix Ancres Noires L'Île des chasseurs d'oiseaux (The Blackhouse) winner of the Prix des Lecteurs at the Les Ancres Noires book festival, Le Havre
- 2011 Cezam Prix Littéraire Inter CE L'Île des chasseurs d'oiseaux (The Blackhouse) winner of the CEZAM Prix Litteraire Inter CE national French Literature Prize.
- 2012 Prix Ancres Noires (2012) L'Homme de Lewis (The Lewis Man) winner of the Prix des Lecteurs at the Les Ancres Noires book festival, Le Havre
- 2012 Grand Prix des Lecteurs du Télégramme (2012) L'Homme de Lewis (The Lewis Man) winner of the Prix des Lecteurs du Télégramme, 10,000 Euro Readers' Prize of French daily newspaper.
- 2012 Prix International, Cognac FestivalL'Homme de Lewis won the 2012 Prix International at the Cognac Festival.
- 2013 Macavity Award for Best Mystery Novel (USA) The Blackhouse shortlisted
- 2013 Theakston's Old Peculier Crime Novel of the Year Award (UK) The Lewis Man shortlisted
- 2013 Barry Award for Best Crime Novel (USA) The Blackhouse won the Barry Award for Best Novel of the Year at a ceremony at Bouchercon, Albany NY.
- '2014 Theakston's Old Peculier Crime Novel of the Year Award (UK) The Chessmen shortlisted
- 2014 Deanstons Scottish Crime Book of the Year Entry Island won the Deanstons Scottish Crime Book of the Year Award at the Bloody Scotland Crime Writing Festival in Stirling September 2014.
- 2014 Specsavers ITV Crime Thriller Book Club Best Read of the Year Entry Island won the Crime Thriller Book Club Best Read of the Year Award at the Specsavers Crime Thriller Awards ceremony in London, October 2014.
- 2015 Dagger in the Library UK Crime Writers' Association award for an author's body of work in British libraries (UK) shortlisted
- 2015 Theakston's Old Peculier Crime Novel of the Year Award (UK) Entry Island shortlisted
- 2015 Trophée 813 (France) Entry Island (L'Île du Serment) won the Trophée 813 for "Best Foreign Crime Novel" awarded by the French magazine Review 813.
- 2021 CWA Dagger in the Library winner of this award which recognises the popularity of an author's body of work with readers and users of libraries.
- 2024 The Palle Rosenkrantz Prize (best crime book of the year in Denmark)
- 2025 Grand Prix de Littérature Policière (France's most prestigious award for crime writing)
