= Claudie Gallay =

French writer (born 1961)

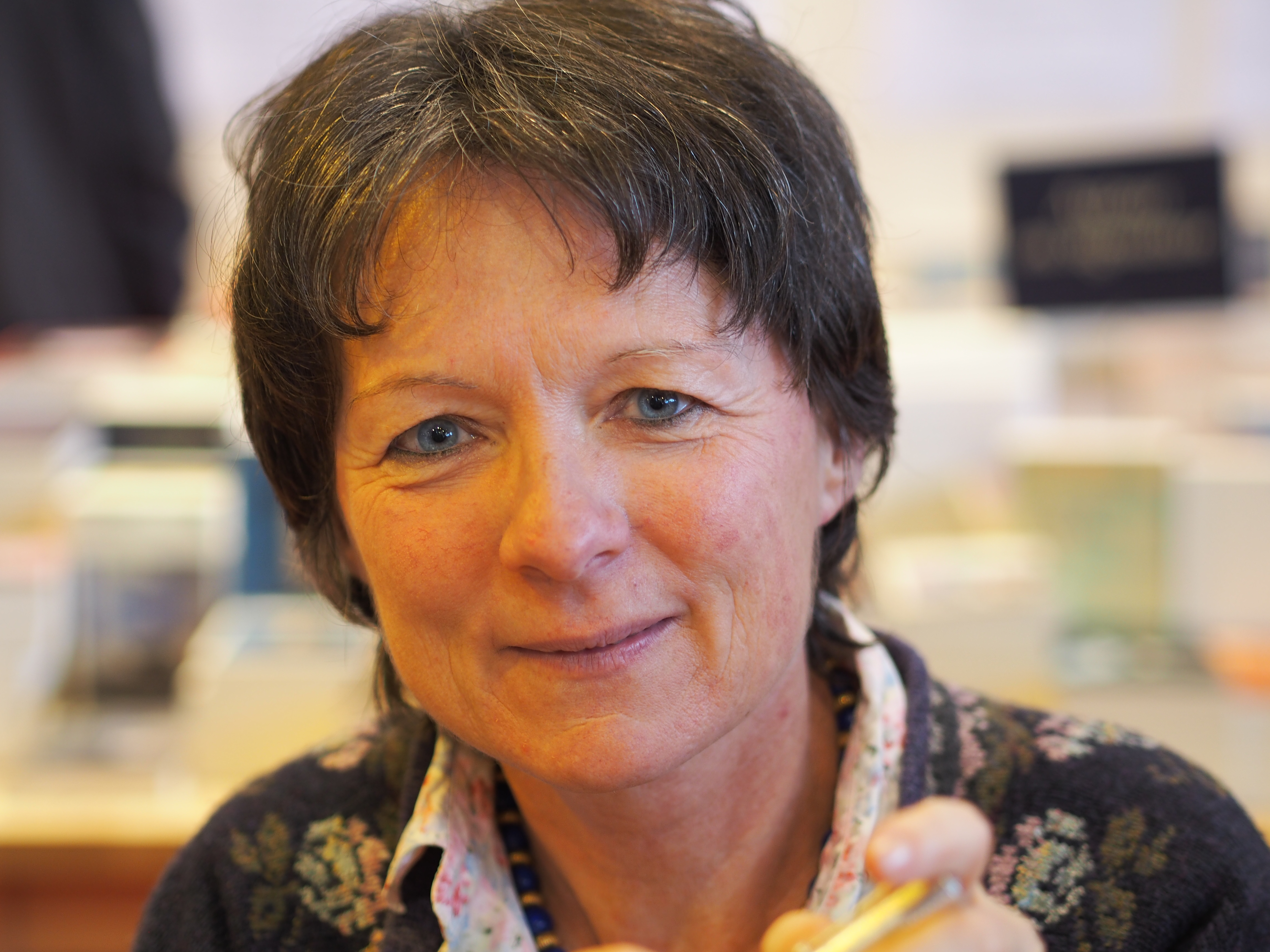
- Claudie Gallay at Salon Livre Paris 2014
- Born: 1961 (age 64–65); Bourgoin-Jallieu, France
- Writing career
- Language: French
- Years active: 2001–present

Claudie Gallay (born 1961) is a French writer. In parallel to her work as a writer, she works part-time as a teacher.

== Bibliography ==
- 2001: L'Office des vivants, Éditions du Rouergue, ISBN 2742782125
- 2002: Mon amour, ma vie, Éditions du Rouergue, ISBN 2742773746
- 2004: Seule Venise, Éditions du Rouergue, Prix d'Ambronay 2004, ISBN 274275573X
  - Cezam Prix Littéraire Inter CE - 2004
- 2004:Les Années cerises, Éditions du Rouergue, ISBN 2841565807
- 2006: Dans l'or du temps, Éditions du Rouergue, ISBN 2742773517
- 2008: Les Déferlantes, Éditions du Rouergue, ISBN 2841569349

- Prix des lecteurs de la Ville de Brive-la-Gaillarde 2008.
- Prix Culture et Bibliothèques pour tous (CBPT) 2009.
- Grand prix des lectrices de Elle 2009.
- Prix Livre & Mer Henri-Queffélec 2009.
- Prix des Lecteurs du Télégramme - Prix Jean-Pierre Coudurier 2009.
- Prix Rosine Perrier 2009.
- Prix Littéraire de la Ville de Caen 2009.

- 2010: L’Amour est une île, Actes Sud, ISBN 2742792856
- 2013: Une part de ciel, Actes Sud, ISBN 2290099791
- 2014: Détails d’Opalka, Actes Sud, ISBN 2330030819

Participation

- La Rencontre, collective, short story collection, Éditions Prisma, 2010. Participation along Marek Halter, Camilla Läckberg, Didier Van Cauwelaert, Éliette Abécassis and Agnès Desarthe.

Preface

- 2009: Testament d'un paysan en voie de disparition by Paul Bedel and Catherine École-Boivin, Presses de la Renaissance, ISBN 978-2750905347

== Adaptation ==
TV

- 2013: Les Déferlantes, based on her 2008 eponymous novel, telefilm directed by Éléonore Faucher, script by Éléonore Faucher and Laurent Vachaud, France. With Sylvie Testud and Bruno Todeschini. (aired on Arte 22 November 2013).

== Prizes and awards ==
- In October 2014, she received the Grand Prix of the City of Saint-Etienne for Détails d’Opalka.
