= Pabbay =

Pabbay (Gaelic: Pabaigh) is the name of several islands in the Outer Hebrides of Scotland:

- Pabbay, Barra Isles, to the south of Barra
- Pabbay, Harris, in the Sound of Harris, between Harris and North Uist
- Pabbay, Loch Baghasdail, in Loch Baghasdail, off South Uist
- Pabaigh Mòr, off the west coast of Lewis

== See also ==
- Papey
- Pabay
- Papa, Scotland
