= 1999 in Scotland =

- Centuries: 18th; 19th; 20th; 21st
- Decades: 1970s; 1980s; 1990s; 2000s; 2010s
- See also: List of years in Scotland; Timeline of Scottish history 1999 in: The UK • England • Wales • Elsewhere; Scottish football: 1998–99 • 1999–2000; 1999 in Scottish television

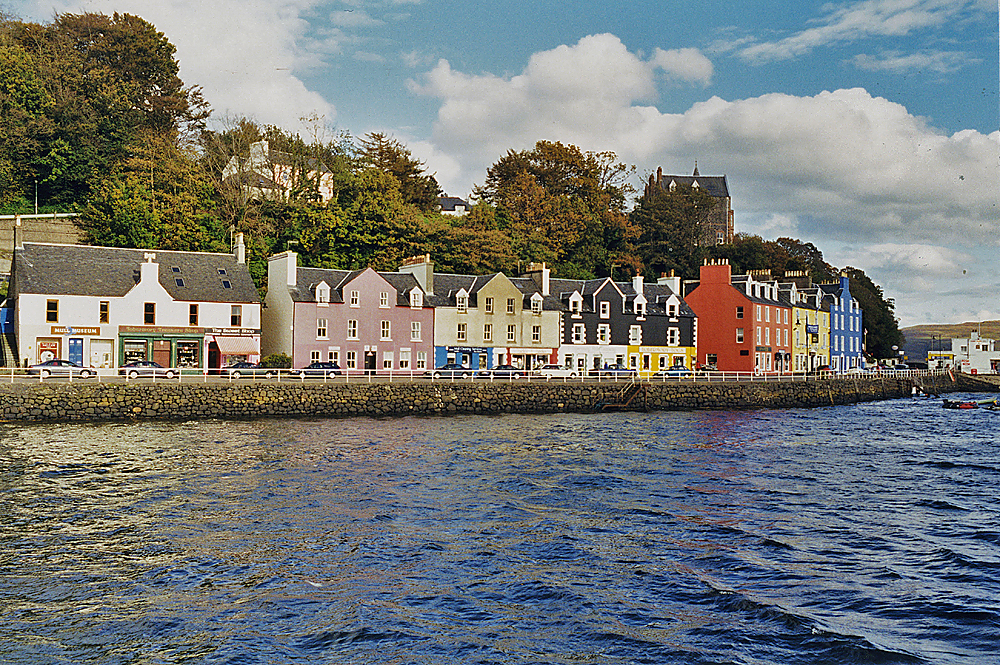

Events from the year 1999 in Scotland.

== Incumbents ==
- First Minister and Keeper of the Great Seal – Donald Dewar (from 17 May 1999)
- Secretary of State for Scotland and Keeper of the Great Seal – Donald Dewar until 17 May; then John Reid

=== Law officers ===
- Lord Advocate – Lord Hardie
- Solicitor General for Scotland – Colin Boyd
- Advocate General for Scotland – Lynda Clark

== Events ==
- 7 February – Sunday Herald newspaper is launched.
- 12 February – scientists at the Rowett Research Institute in Aberdeen reinforce warnings that genetically modified food may be damaging to the human body.
- 31 March – Buchanan Galleries shopping mall opened to the public in Glasgow city centre.
- 6 May – 1999 Scottish Parliament election: the first elections to the new Scottish Parliament.
- 7 May – no party wins overall majority in the first general election to the Scottish Parliament. The Labour Party and the Liberal Democrats agree to form a coalition government, with Donald Dewar as the First Minister of Scotland.
- 12 May – the Scottish Parliament meets in Edinburgh for its first session in the General Assembly Hall of the Church of Scotland on the Royal Mile.
- 17 May – Donald Dewar is officially sworn in as the First Minister of Scotland.
- 31 May – the Orkney island of Papa Stronsay is purchased by The Transalpine Congregation of the Most Holy Redeemer, a traditionalist Catholic religious institute which will establish Golgotha Monastery there.
- June – Scotland's first Gaelic-medium primary school, Glasgow Gaelic School (Bunsgoil Ghàidhlig Ghlaschu), opens.
- 11 June – fire at Garnock Court (flats), Irvine with one fatality.
- 1 July – formal transfer of powers from Westminster to the new Scottish Parliament.
- 4 August – George Robertson, MP for Hamilton South, appointed as Secretary General of NATO.
- 9 August – Charles Kennedy, MP for Ross, Cromarty and Skye, elected leader of the Liberal Democrats (UK).
- August – composer James MacMillan in a speech "Scotland's Shame" at the Edinburgh Festival attacks religious bigotry in Scotland.
- 13 September – Mental Health (Public Safety and Appeals) (Scotland) Act 1999 becomes the first Act of the Scottish Parliament to be passed, adding public safety to the grounds for not discharging certain patients detained under the Mental Health (Scotland) Act 1984, thus closing a legal loophole.
- 23 September – Hamilton South by-election results in Labour's Bill Tynan holding the UK parliament seat by 556 votes in the face of a 22.6% swing to the SNP.
- November – Scottish Women's Football League (SWFL) established
- 3 November – the Lanarkshire-born actor Ian Bannen is killed in a car accident near Loch Ness.
- 17 November – the Scotland national football team fail to qualify for UEFA Euro 2000 after a 2–1 aggregate defeat by England in the qualifying playoff round.
- 30 November – Museum of Scotland in Edinburgh officially opened.
- 2 December – the 'Heart of Neolithic Orkney' is designated as a World Heritage Site.
- 4 December – Barry Wallace, an 18 year old man from Kilmarnock, attends a Christmas night out with colleagues from Tesco and fails to return home.
- 5 December – Barry Wallace is formally reported as missing by his family.
- 7 December – During a routine diving exercise at Loch Lomond, officers from Strathclyde Police discover human limbs in the loch.
- 8 December – More body parts are discovered in Loch Lomond by Strathclyde Police. They are widely speculated to belong to Barry Wallace who had gone missing three days prior.
- 15 December – A head is washed up on Brassie Beach in Troon and discovered by a member of the public walking her dog. The head was later identified as belonging to Barry Wallace who had been missing since 5 December. DNA analysis confirmed that the head and other parts found in Loch Lomond belonged to Wallace.
- 17 December – Strathclyde Police raid the flat belonging to William Beggs in Kilmarnock.
- 21 December – Strathclyde Police issue a warrant for the arrest of William Frederick Ian Beggs, aged 36 and originally from Northern Ireland, in connection to the death of Barry Wallace.
- 23 December – The Crown Office and Procurator Fiscal Service permits Strathclyde Police to issue an image of William Beggs.
- 28 December – William Beggs is arrested in the Netherlands. A Dutch lawyer who represented Beggs claims Beggs will "fight extradition proceedings from the Netherlands to Scotland".
- The last Elder of the Glasite Church dies in Edinburgh.

== Arts and literature ==
- 24 May – Soft rock band Travis release their album The Man Who which goes platinum.

== Births ==
- 1 March – Brogan Hay, Scottish footballer
- 11 June – Eartha Cumings, footballer

== Deaths ==
- 11 January – Naomi Mitchison, novelist (born 1897)
- 30 January – Mick McGahey, Communist miners' leader (born 1925)
- 9 August – Cliff Hanley, writer (born 1922)
- 11 September – Janet Adam Smith, writer and mountaineer (born 1905)
- 1 October – Lena Zavaroni, entertainer (born 1963)
- 3 November – Ian Bannen, actor (born 1928)

== See also ==
- 1999 in England
- 1999 in Northern Ireland
- 1999 in Wales
