= Little Linga, Orkney Islands =

Uninhabited island in Orkney, Scotland

Little Linga
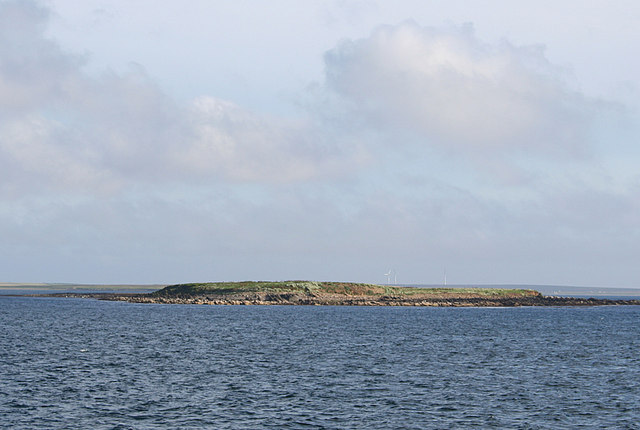
- Little Linga, Orkney

Location
- Little Linga shown within Orkney
- OS grid reference: HY 607 303
- Coordinates: 59.157°N 2.688°W

Administration
- Country: Scotland
- Sovereign state: United Kingdom

Little Linga is a small uninhabited island in Orkney, Scotland. It lies off Links Ness, at the north-western point of the island of Stronsay, approximately 2 km (1.24 mi) north of Linga Holm. Its bedrock consists of siltstone, mudstone and sandstone in the Caithness Flagstone Group. This is overlaid by sedimentary deposits which are glacigenic in origin.

Little Linga is an important colony for the Atlantic grey seal, with approximately 500 pups born on the island each autumn. The island also has a breeding population of around 80 pairs of cormorants, nesting on raised platforms of seaweed, and 200 pairs of fulmars. On 21 June 2016, the island was acquired by the Scottish Wildlife Trust from the Ferne Animal Sanctuary, which had owned it for more than 25 years, to protect it as a seal sanctuary.

The island has been inhabited in the past, with two prehistoric house-sites remaining.

== See also ==
- Holm of Huip
- List of islands of Scotland
- Linga Holm
