= Papa, Scotland =

This is a list of places in Scotland called Papa or similar, which are so named after the Papar, monks from the Early Historic Period or from their connection to other, later priests.

== Orkney ==
=== Islands ===
- Papa Stronsay
- Papa Westray (also known as "Papay")
- Holm of Papay

John of Fordun in his 14th century enumeration of these islands, has a Papeay tertia ("third Papey"), the location of which is unknown.

=== Placenames ===
- Paplay, South Ronaldsay
- Paplay, Holm, Mainland
- Papdale, an early name for Kirkwall

Papleyhouse on Eday and Steevens of Papay on North Ronaldsay may not be genuinely related to the Papar.

== Shetland ==
- Papa, Shetland, one of the Scalloway Islands, lying north west of Burra and east of Oxna
  - West Head of Papa, a tidal island off Papa, Shetland
- Papa Little
- Papa Stour (Great Papa)
- Sound of Papa, a strait between Papa Stour and the Sandness peninsula.

== Hebrides ==
Gaelic, Pabaigh, (Pabaigh) anglicised to "Pabay" or "Pabbay" means "priest island", but it is not clear if these names refer to the early Papar or later, post-Norse priests.

- Pabay, off the island of Skye.
- Pabbay near Barra lying in the Bishop's Isles
- Pabbay near Harris
- Pabbay, South Uist at grid reference NF775195

== See also ==
- Papey - an Icelandic island named after the Papar.
