= 1963 in Scottish television =

This is a list of events in Scottish television from 1963.

== Events ==
- 8 January - The Beatles record a performance for the children's programme Roundup at the Scottish Television studios in Glasgow.
- Unknown - Fifty Grampian shows feature in the local Top Ten audience ratings.

== Television series ==
- Scotsport (1957–2008)
- The White Heather Club (1958–1968)
- Dr. Finlay's Casebook (1962–1971)
- The Adventures of Francie and Josie (1962–1970)

== Births ==
- 28 February – Stephen Jardine, journalist and presenter
- 8 May - Stella Gonet, actress
- 21 September - Angus Macfadyen, actor
- 4 November - Lena Zavaroni, singer and television presenter (died 1999)
- 24 November - Cal MacAninch, actor
- 28 November - Armando Iannucci, comedian

== Deaths ==
- 5 March - Cyril Smith, 70, actor

== See also ==
- 1963 in Scotland
