= Longay =

Uninhabited Scottish island

Longaigh (Gaelic)

Location
- Longay shown within Highland Scotland
- OS grid reference: NG658310
- Coordinates: 57.31°N 5.89°W

Name
- Name meaning: longship island
- Old Norse name: Long-øy

Physical geography
- Island group: Skye
- Area: 50 ha (3/16 sq mi)
- Area rank: 199=
- Highest elevation: 67 m (220 ft)

Administration
- Council area: Highland
- Country: Scotland
- Sovereign state: United Kingdom

Demographics
- Population: 0

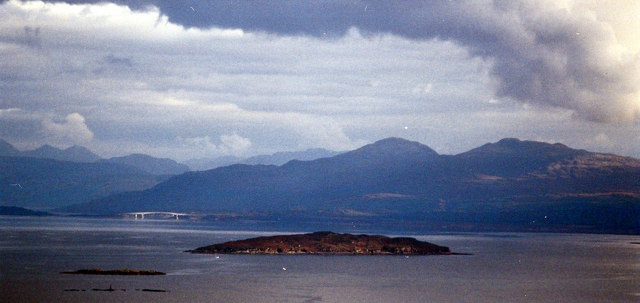
Longay with Skye Bridge behind

Longay (Scottish Gaelic: Longaigh) is a small uninhabited Scottish island in the Inner Sound just off the coast of the Isle of Skye, north of Pabay and east of Scalpay.

In 1971, the Caledonian MacBrayne mailboat Loch Seaforth ran aground on the island, sustaining only minimal damage.
