= Scalpay =

There is more than one island named Scalpay (Scottish Gaelic: Sgalpaigh):

- Scalpay, Inner Hebrides (near Skye)
- Scalpay, Outer Hebrides (near Harris)
