= Inner Sound =

Inner Sound may refer to:

- Inner Sound, Scotland, a body of water separating the Inner Hebrides from the mainland
- Shabda, the esoteric essence of God in some religions
