= Stronsay =

Island in Orkney, Scotland

Stronsaigh (Gaelic)
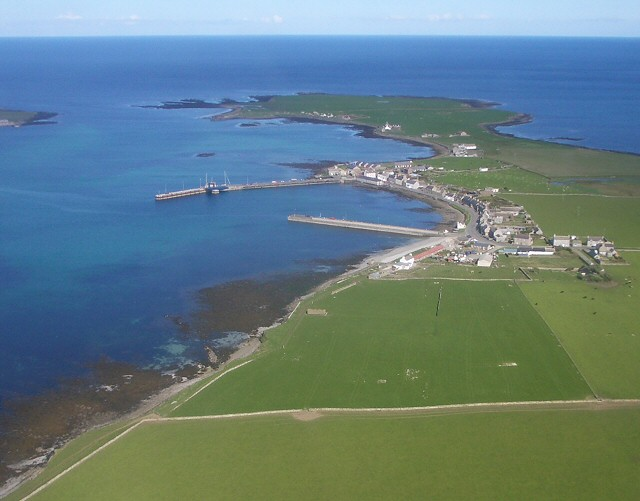
- An aerial view of Whitehall, with Grice Ness at the end of Stronsay's north-eastern peninsula

Location
- Stronsay shown within Orkney
- OS grid reference: HY669239
- Coordinates: 59.1°N 2.6°W

Name
- Name meaning: Old Norse for "good fishing and farming island"
- Old Norse name: Strjónsey

Physical geography
- Island group: Orkney
- Area: 3,275 hectares (13 sq mi)
- Area rank: 27
- Highest elevation: Burgh Hill 44 metres (144 ft)

Administration
- Council area: Orkney Islands
- Country: Scotland
- Sovereign state: United Kingdom

Demographics
- Population: 321
- Population rank: 26
- Population density: 10 people/km^{2}
- Largest settlement: Whitehall

Stronsay (/ˈstrɒnziː/) is an island in Orkney, Scotland. It is known as Orkney's 'Island of Bays', owing to an irregular shape with miles of coastline and three large bays separated by two isthmuses: St Catherine's Bay to the west, the Bay of Holland to the south and Mill Bay to the east. Stronsay is 3,275 hectares (13 square miles) in area, and 44 metres (144 feet) in altitude at its highest point. It has a usually resident population of about 320. The main village is Whitehall, home to a heritage centre.

Sights on the island include the Vat of Kirbister, a natural arch described as the "finest in Orkney", white sand beaches in the three bays, and various seabirds amongst which are Arctic terns.

== Environment ==
=== Geography and geology ===
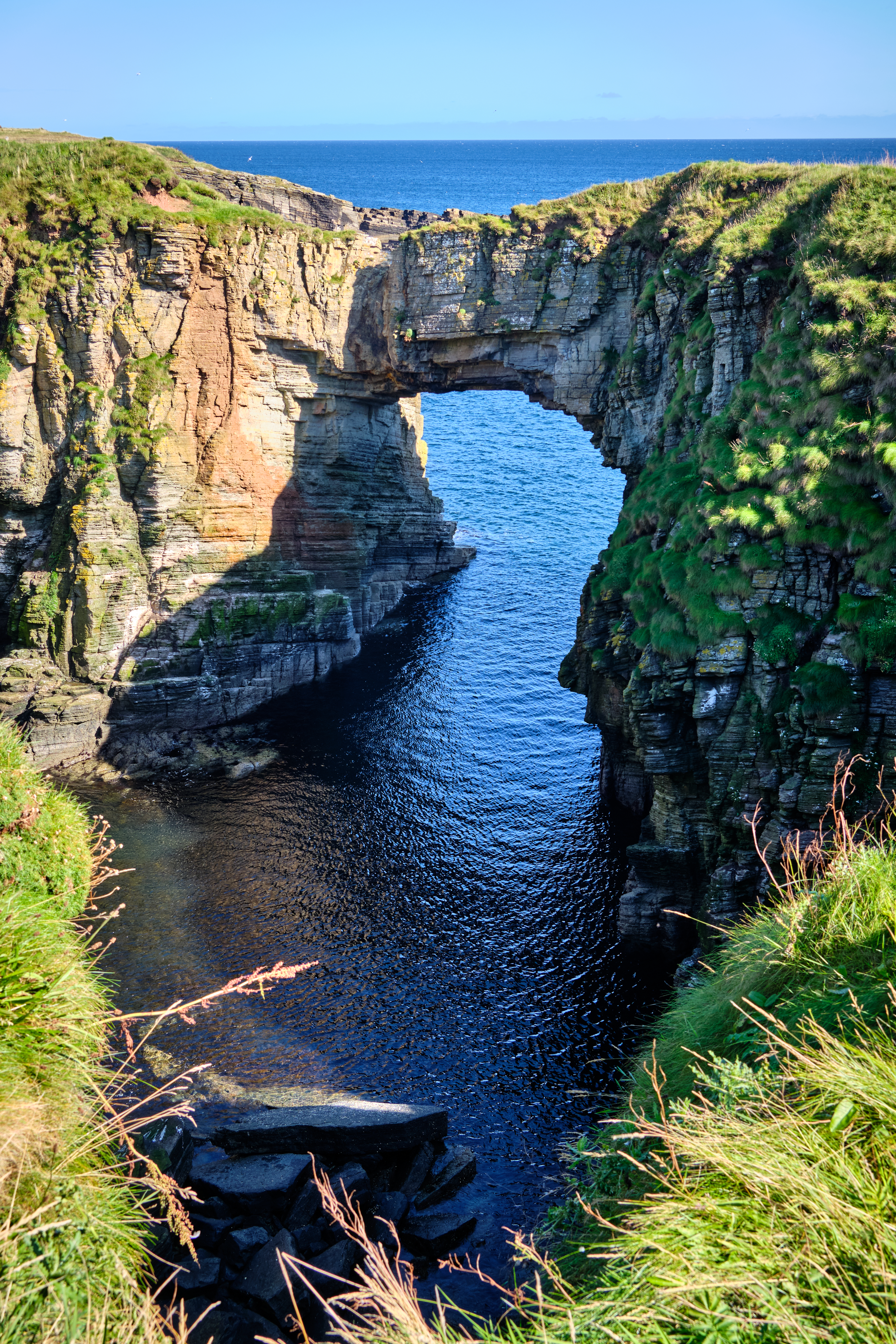
Vat of Kirbister, on the east coast of Stronsay

As with most of Orkney, Stronsay is made up of Old Red Sandstone which has produced a fine soil in many places. It is generally low-lying.

On the eastern coast, spectacular rock formations include the Vat of Kirbister – Stronsay's famous natural rock arch, often described as the finest in Orkney. The coast around Odiness Bay features numerous dramatic geos, caves, flagstone rock platforms and sea stacks, including Tam's Castle, reputed to have once housed a hermitage on its flat summit.

Stronsay is the seventh largest of the Orkney Islands. Surrounding small islands include Linga Holm, Little Linga, Papa Stronsay, the Holm of Huip (named after a district in north west Stronsay) and the Holms of Spurness. To the north is Sanday, to the north west Eday, to the south west Shapinsay and Mainland Orkney, and the islet of Auskerry due south.

=== Wildlife ===
Sketch of the "Stronsay beast" made by Sir Alexander Gibson in 1808.

While the landscape has few trees, the fertile soil supports a wide variety of wildflowers, including oysterplant, frog orchids, adder's tongue, and also a naturalised population of Patagonian ragwort. Seals can also be spotted at many locations, including the Ayre of the Myers, a popular picnic spot near Whitehall, at the twin south-facing bays at Houseby and Sand of Crook or from the seal-hide near Holland Bay. They also breed on nearby Little Linga.

There is a wide variety of birds on the island, and birdwatchers have recorded many rarities. Common species include whooper swan, various ducks and geese including the greater white-fronted goose, as well as common redshank, common snipe, common quail, great skua, corn bunting and corncrake, the last of which is rare in Scotland. Many seabirds can be seen from Lamb Ness and Lamb Head. The Stronsay Bird Reserve is said to be one of the best sites in Europe to spot rare migrants such as American golden plover, Arctic redpoll, pied wheatear, rustic bunting, scarlet rosefinch, tawny pipit and various warblers, including Radde's warbler, marsh warbler and western subalpine warbler.

Both the Rothiesholm Peninsula and coastline of south-eastern Stronsay have been designated Important Bird Areas (IBAs) by BirdLife International because they support breeding seabirds.

== History ==
Two flint arrowheads discovered at a site investigated by Orkney College in April 2007 are believed to date from the late Paleolithic or early Mesolithic periods some 10–12,000 years ago. They were found amongst a scattered collection of other tools on a farm. If confirmed, they could be the earliest human artifacts found in Scotland.

The island is now agricultural, but during the 18th and 19th centuries, kelp collection and herring curing employed up to 5000 people. The population was over 1000 for the entire 19th century and until the mid-20th century, with the 1891 census recording a population of 1275, excluding seasonal itinerants involved in the herring industry.

The kelp burning industry was started by James Fea of Whitehall in 1727, and thrived during the remainder of the 18th century, lasting into the early 19th century; some of the kiln ruins can still be seen.

=== Fishing ===
The Annual Reports of the Fishery Board for Scotland provide an insight into fishing in Stronsay in the years before the First World War. In 1913 the Board reported that Stronsay was the "principal herring curing station in [the Orkney] District, but no attention [was] given to line fishing".

Fishery Statistics

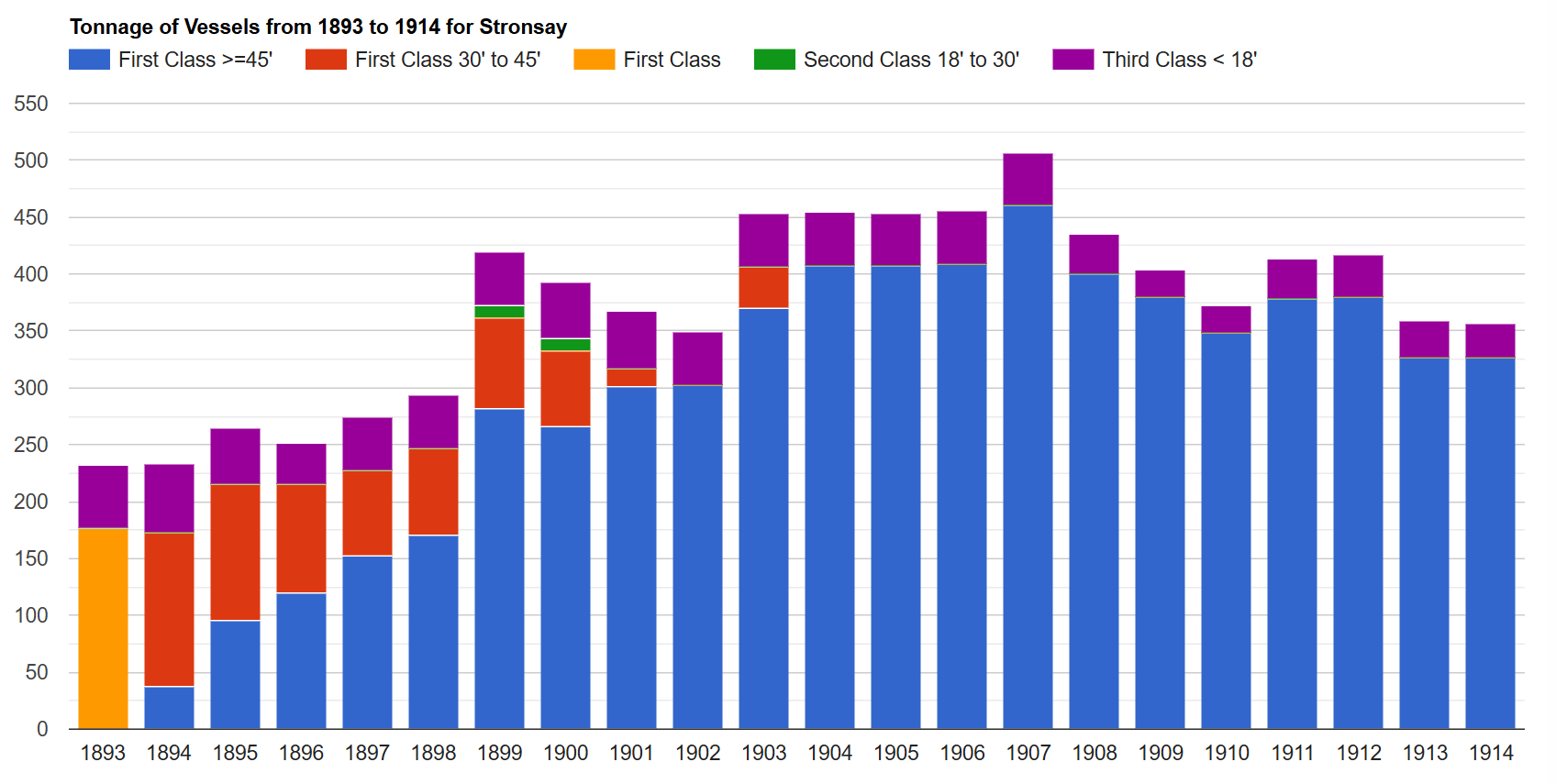
Tonnage of vessels

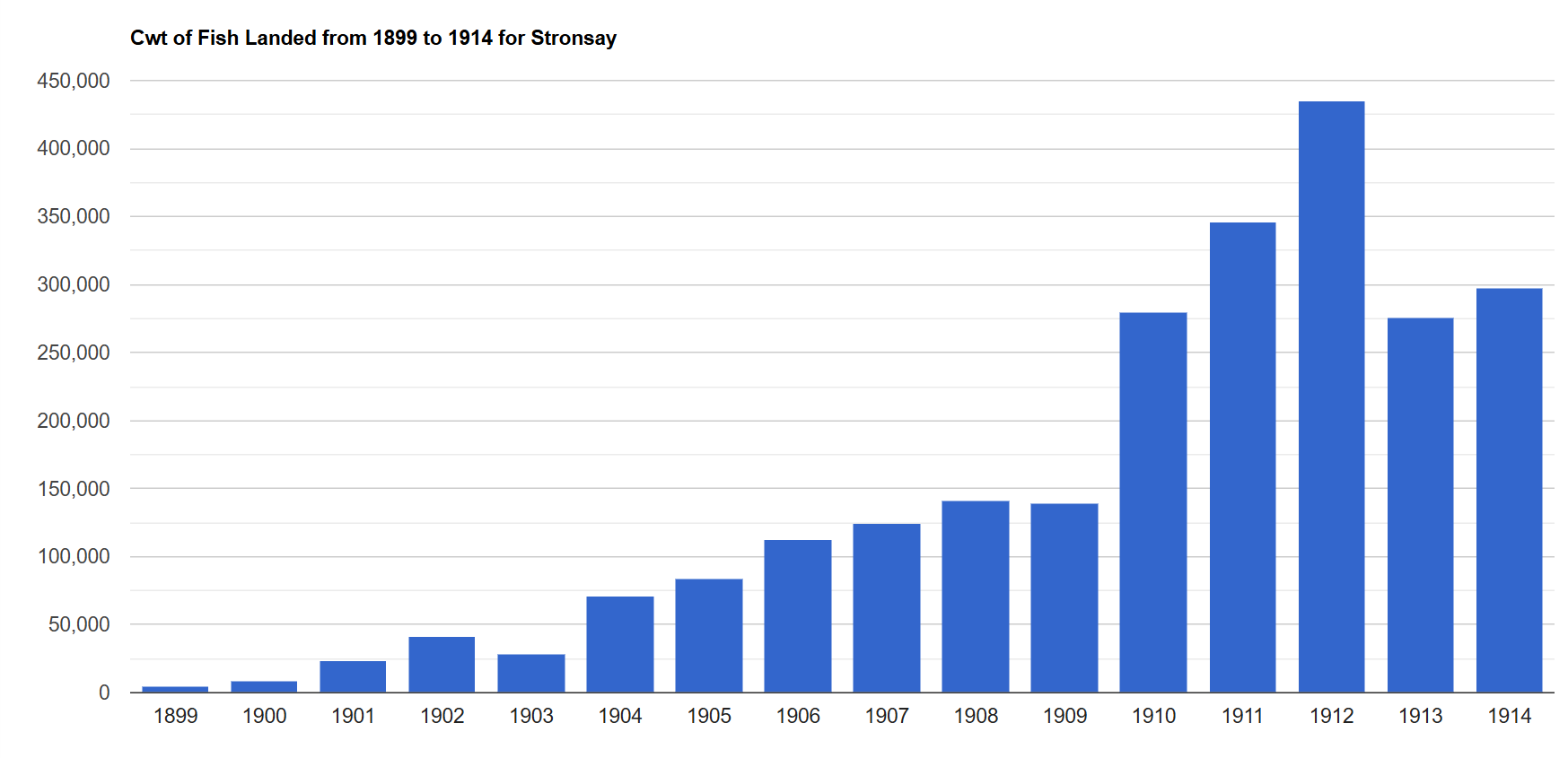
Cwt of fish landed

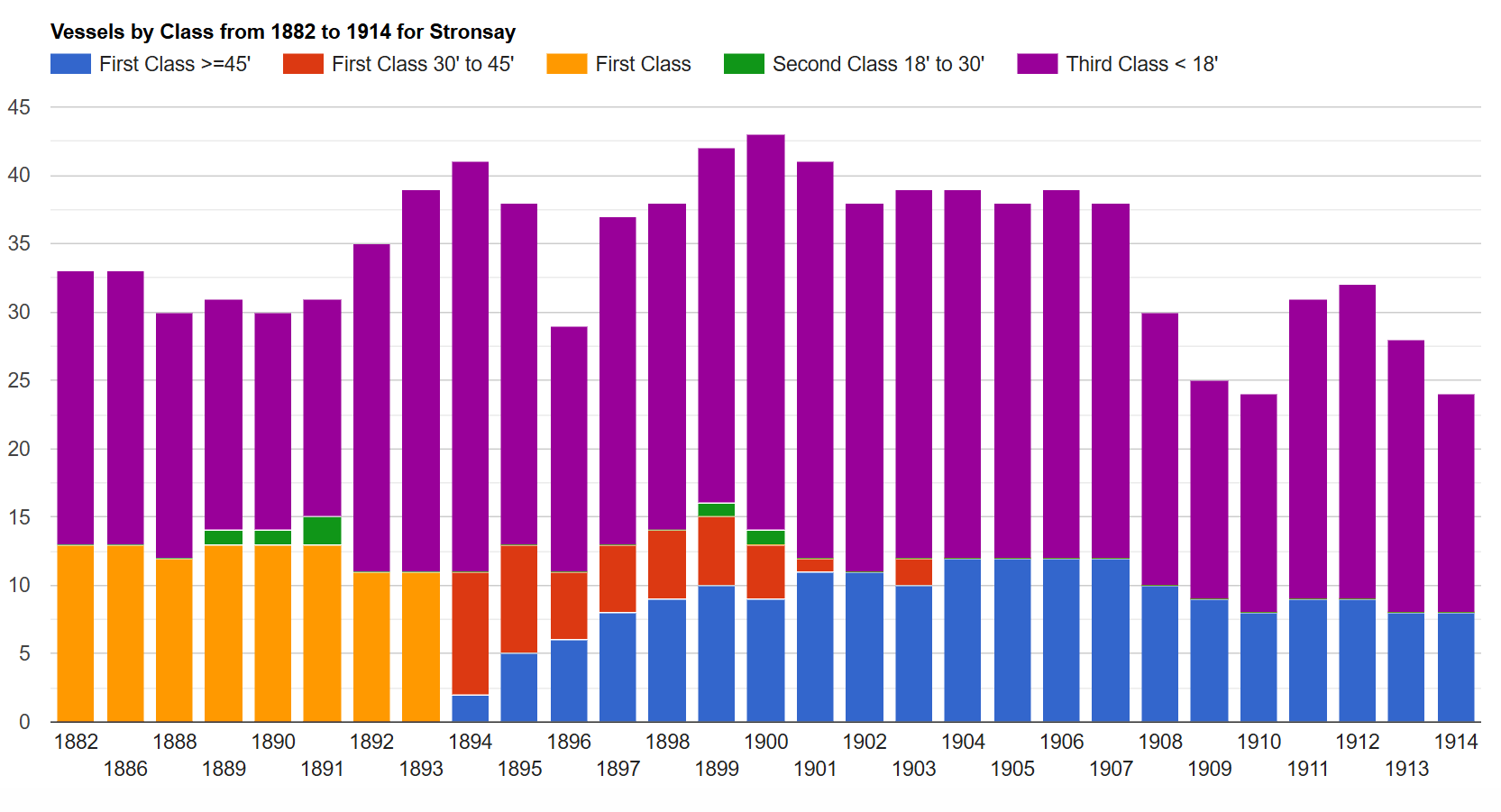
Vessels by class

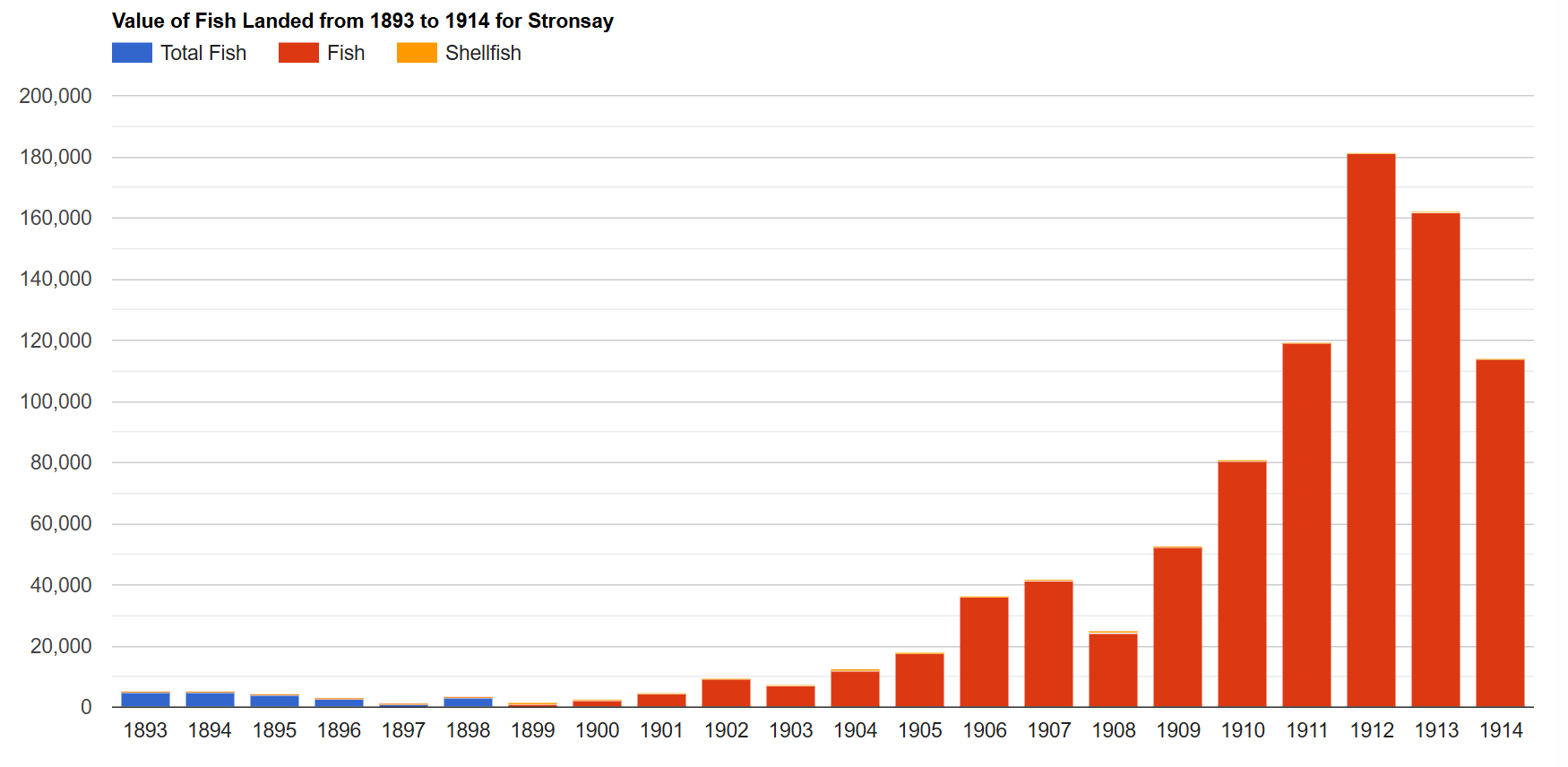
Value (£) of fish landed

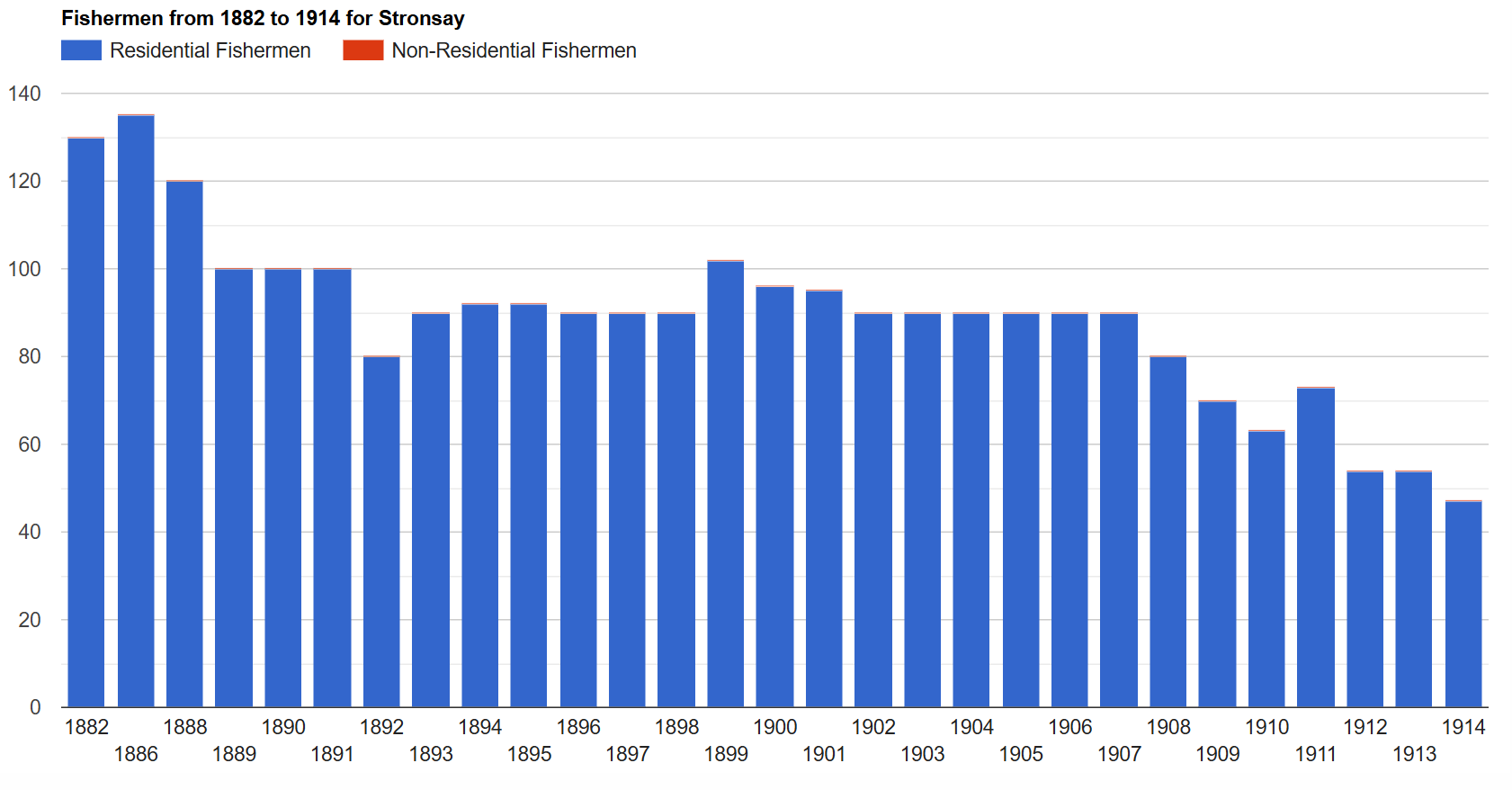
Fishermen

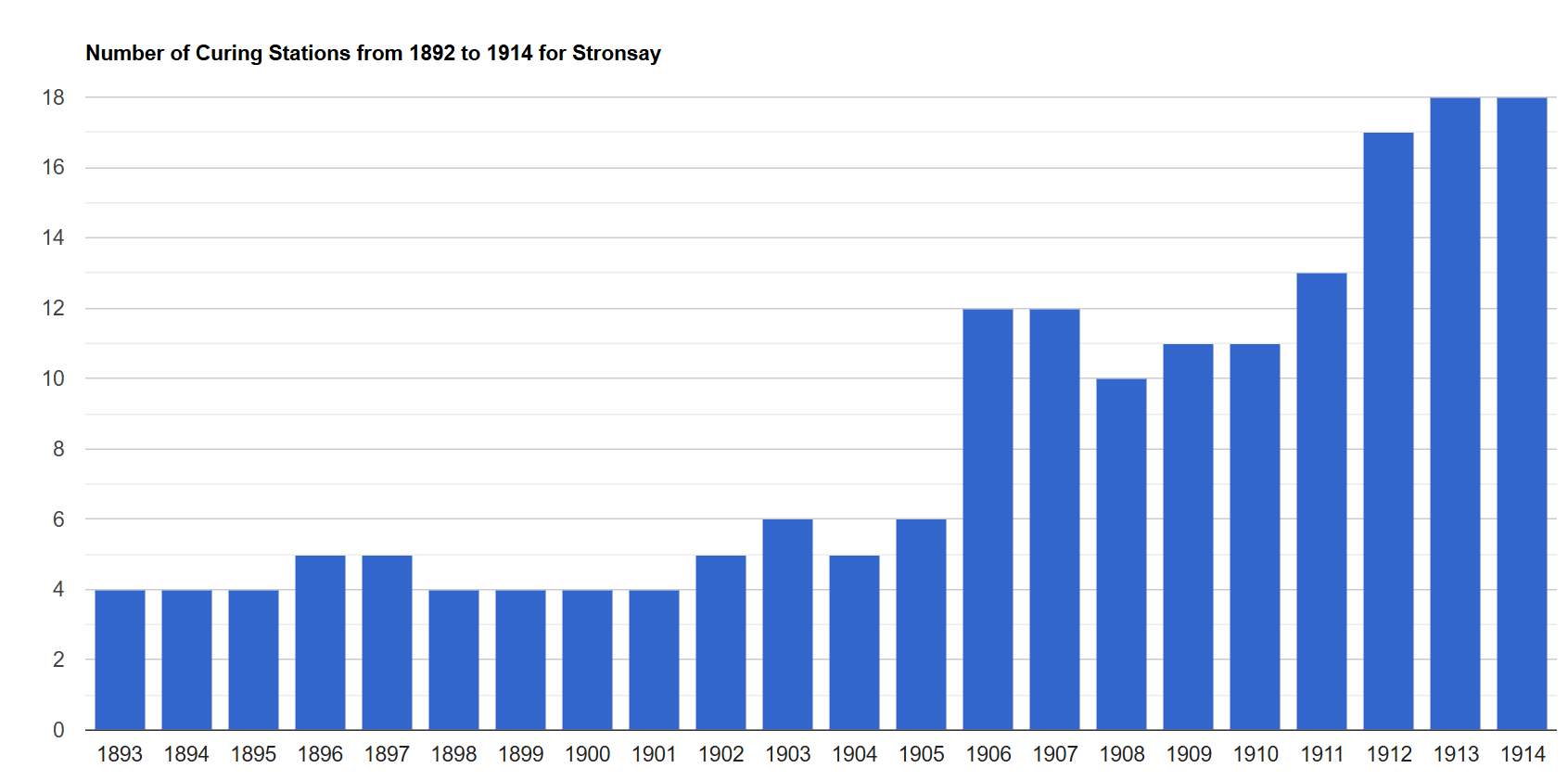
Number of curing stations

== Demography and economy ==
The usual resident population of the island was 321 in 2022 compared to 349 in 2011 and 342 in 2001. The island is mainly agricultural; farming and fishing are the main industries. The community is trying to develop the economy by improving tourism infrastructure. There is a thriving craft community, with several specialised craft shops.

Much of the settlement is strung out along the island's main road, but the main population centre is Whitehall village, in the north of the island, with a row of seafront houses and two piers, a link to the village's foundation as a herring fishing station in the 19th century. There is a variety of accommodation in Whitehall, including the Stronsay Hotel, Storehouse B&B and FishMart hostel. The island's school is well-resourced and caters for nursery, primary and secondary pupils.

Orkney Ferries sail from Whitehall to Kirkwall on the Orkney Mainland, and planes fly there from the island's airstrip (Stronsay Airport), also in the north of the island.

Whitehall overlooks the separate island of Papa Stronsay, across the blue waters of Papa Sound. A prominent feature of the smaller island is the Golgotha Monastery complex of the Sons of the Most Holy Redeemer. Visitors are welcome and the monks can help arrange boat trips.

Moncur Memorial Church is the Church of Scotland centre of worship on Stronsay and there is a Catholic chapel in Whitehall, which is part of the Diocese of Aberdeen.

== See also ==
- List of islands of Scotland
- Papa Stronsay – a nearby islet which belongs to the Sons of the Most Holy Redeemer, a traditionalist Catholic organisation.
- Stronsay Beast
