= Whitehall, Orkney =

Coordinates: 59.140°N 2.602°W

Whitehall
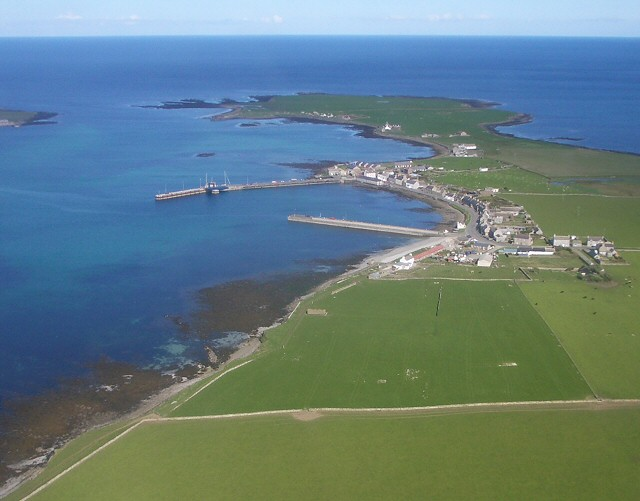
- An aerial view of Whitehall Village, with Lower Whitehall and Grice Ness beyond

- Location within Orkney
- OS grid reference: HY656283
- Civil parish: Stronsay
- Council area: Orkney Islands
- Lieutenancy area: Orkney Islands
- Country: Scotland
- Sovereign state: United Kingdom
- Post town: ORKNEY
- Postcode district: KW17
- Dialling code: 01857
- Police: Scotland
- Fire: Scottish
- Ambulance: Scottish
- UK Parliament: Orkney and Shetland
- Scottish Parliament: Orkney

Whitehall is the village on the island of Stronsay, in the Orkney Islands of Scotland. It is a small village with about 50 houses. It also has a shop, a café and heritage centre, known as the Fish Mart; the Stronsay Hotel, with attached pub; a post office, a fisherman's pier and a ferry pier.

== History ==
Whitehall is a former boom town, whose historical growth and decline has been linked to that of the herring industry, which was initially developed by the Dutch.

It takes its name from a house built in the 1670s by Patrick Fea, a retired privateer, whose descendant John Fea pioneered the kelp burning industry on the island in 1722.

The fall of the herring industry came with overfishing, and the outbreak of World War II. There was also a similar decline during World War I, but a brief rebirth in the interbellum. Until then it had been the biggest herring port in the northern Orkney Islands, trading mainly with the Baltic ports. At its height, 300 boats were moored in Whitehall harbour, along with fifteen curing stations, and 1500 fishwives. Many of the population were itinerant. As a side effect, there were forty pubs here in the high season, and many houses took lodgers. The wealth can be seen in the large houses which still dominate the town.

Aside from herring fishing and kelp burning, there was also a smaller industry in occasional whaling. Fifty whales were once driven into nearby Mill Bay for oil, in a move similar to the Faroese grindadráp.
