= Papar =

Pre-Norse Irish monks of Iceland

Coordinates: 57.1527°N 7.3353°W

The Papar (Icelandic pronunciation: [ˈpʰaːpar̥]; from Latin papa, via Old Irish, meaning "father" or "pope") were Irish and Scottish monks who took eremitic residence in the Hebrides, the Northern Isles, the Faroe Islands and parts of Iceland from the late sixth to the late eighth century, before the expansion of Norse settlement around the North Atlantic. Their existence is attested by the early Icelandic sagas and recent archaeological findings. However, the existence of the Papar in Iceland remains archaeologically unproven; no clear archaeological evidence of Papar presence in Iceland has been identified.

== Papar in Iceland ==
The first Norsemen began settling in Iceland in AD 874. The oldest Scandinavian source mentioning the existence of the Papar, however, the Íslendingabók (Book of the Icelanders) by Icelandic chronicler Ari Þorgilsson, was written between 1122 and 1133, some time after the event. Ari writes of "Christian men", titled the Papar by the Norsemen, who departed the island because of their dislike of the 'heathen' Norse, pointing to the possibility of the Papar having arrived before the Norse.

An earlier source that could possibly refer to the Papar is the work of Dicuil, an early 9th-century Irish monk and geographer, which included mention of the wandering of "holy men" to the lands of the north. However, it is not known whether Dicuil is speaking about Iceland, as Gaelic-Irish hermits also settled in other islands of the north such as Orkney and Shetland.

Several Icelandic toponyms have been linked to the Papar, including the island of Papey and the Vestmannaeyjar ("islands of the Westmen"), but no archaeological evidence in these places has yet confirmed the link.

Another theory is that the two sources were conflated and that Þorgilsson based his history on the writings of Dicuil.

The Landnámabók (The Icelandic Book of Settlements), possibly dating from the 11th century in its original form, clearly states on page one that Irish monks had been living in Iceland before the arrival of Norse settlers. According to this account, the basis behind this knowledge was monks' leaving behind numerous reminders of their stay, including Irish books, bells, and crosiers, helping the Norse to identify their predecessors. According to the Landnámabók, the Irish monks either left the island when the Norse arrived or were no longer living there when the Norse arrived.

== Papar in the Faroe Islands ==
There are also several toponyms relating to the Papar in the Faroe Islands. Among these are Paparøkur near Vestmanna, and Papurshílsur near Saksun. Vestmanna, in fact, is short for Vestmannahøvn, meaning the "harbour of the Westmen" (Gaels). A churchyard on the island of Skúgvoy also has tombstones which display a possible Gaelic origin or influence.

Some of the sagas suggest that Grímr, a Norse explorer, may have been responsible for driving them out, despite probably being a Norse–Gael himself:

According to the Faereyinga Saga... the first settler in the Faroe Islands was a man named Grímur Kamban – Hann bygdi fyrstr Færeyar, it may have been the land taking of Grímur and his followers that caused the anchorites to leave... the nickname Kamban is probably Gaelic and one interpretation is that the word refers to some physical handicap, another that it may point to his prowess as a sportsman. Probably he came as a young man to the Faroe Islands by way of Viking Ireland, and local tradition suggests he then settled at Funningur in Eysturoy.

== Papar in the Northern Isles ==
The 12th-century Historia Norwegiæ speculatively identifies the native Picts and Papar as those that the Norse discovered when they invaded Orkney in the early ninth century.

Originally those islands were inhabited by Pents and Papes. Of these races, the Pents, only a little taller than pygmies, accomplished miraculous achievements by building towns morning and evenings but at midday every ounce of strength deserted them and they hid for fear in underground chambers. [...] The Papes were so called on account of the vestments in which they clothed themselves like priests, and for this reason all priests are known as papen in the German tongue. However, as the appearance and letter forms of the books that they left behind them testifys that they were from Africa and clove to the Jewish faith.

Ekrem and Mortensen point out: "The author of HN does not agree with the earlier work of Ari (Íslendingabók), who writes that they were Christians and Irish. More recent research confirms the Irish Celtic Christian missionaries, principally through Dalriadic Gaels prior to Norwegian rule.

Historian Joseph Anderson noted in his Introduction to Orkneyinga Saga several Island toponyms deriving from Papar, suggesting their influence upon the region:

The two Papeys [of Orkney], the great and the little (anciently Papey Meiri and Papey Minni), [are] now Papa Westray and Papa Stronsay... John of Fordun in his enumeration of the islands, has a 'Papeay tertia' [third Papey], which is not now known. There are three islands in Shetland called Papey, and both in Orkney and in Shetland, there are several districts named Paplay or Papplay, doubtless the same as Papyli of Iceland.

William Thomson suggests that "perhaps Papay Tercia was the Holm of Papay – not a separate papar-site but a holm subsidiary to Papa Westray".

== Papar in the Hebrides ==
The Outer Hebrides have numerous Papar-influenced toponyms, but with the crucial difference that the Norse language died out early in this area, and it is arguable whether Scottish Gaelic ever died out at all. There are at least three islands originally named Papey and renamed "Pabbay" (Scottish Gaelic: Pabaigh) in the Outer Hebrides of Scotland:

- Pabbay, Barra Isles
- Pabbay, Harris
- Pabay, the Inner Hebrides near Skye
- Pabaigh, Loch Baghasdail, South Uist

== See also ==
- Culdees
- Gaelic Ireland
- Great Ireland
- Christianization of Scandinavia
- Papa, Scotland

== Sources ==
- Ballin Smith, Beverley, Taylor, Simon and Williams, Gareth (eds) (2007) West Over Sea: Studies in Scandinavian Sea-borne Expansion and Settlement Before 1300. Brill. ISBN 90-04-15893-6
