= 1963 in Scotland =

- Centuries: 18th; 19th; 20th; 21st
- Decades: 1940s; 1950s; 1960s; 1970s; 1980s
- See also: List of years in Scotland; Timeline of Scottish history 1963 in: The UK • Wales • Elsewhere; Scottish football: 1962–63 • 1963–64; 1963 in Scottish television

Events from the year 1963 in Scotland.

== Incumbents ==
- Secretary of State for Scotland and Keeper of the Great Seal – Michael Noble

=== Law officers ===
- Lord Advocate – Ian Shearer, Lord Avonside
- Solicitor General for Scotland – David Colville Anderson

=== Judiciary ===
- Lord President of the Court of Session and Lord Justice General – Lord Clyde
- Lord Justice Clerk – Lord Grant
- Chairman of the Scottish Land Court – Lord Gibson

== Events ==
- 1 January – Forth and Clyde Canal officially closed to navigation.
- 2 May – Rootes car factory opens at Linwood, Renfrewshire to produce the Hillman Imp
- 3 July – northbound Clyde Tunnel opened to traffic in Glasgow
- 31 July – Peerage Act grants Peers of Scotland the same right to sit in the House of Lords as Peers of England, Great Britain and the United Kingdom, ending the election of Scottish representative peers; it will also permit Alec Douglas-Home to disclaim his title as 14th Earl of Home later this year
- 15 August – Henry John Burnett is hanged for murder in Aberdeen, the last execution carried out in Scotland
- 7 November – Kinross and Western Perthshire by-election: Conservatives retain the seat allowing Prime Minister Alec Douglas-Home to enter the House of Commons
- 21 November – Dundee West by-election: Labour retains the seat
- 12 December – Dumfriesshire by-election: Conservatives retain the seat
- Construction of the pioneering Solidac minicomputer is completed at Barr and Stroud for the University of Glasgow, the first computer built in Scotland
- First road access (a forest track) to the railway community at Riccarton Junction.

== Births ==
- 3 January – Stewart Hosie, SNP politician
- 13 April – Mo Johnston, international footballer
- 25 April – David Moyes, footballer and manager
- 27 April – Brendan O'Hara, SNP politician
- 7 June – Ailsa McKay, economist and academic (died 2014)
- 23 June – Colin Montgomerie, golfer
- 6 September – Pat Nevin, international footballer
- 21 September – Angus Macfadyen, actor
- 4 November – Lena Zavaroni, entertainer (died 1999)
- 24 November – Neale Cooper, footballer and manager (died 2018)
- 28 November – Armando Iannucci, satirist
- 30 November – Alex Rowley, Labour Party politician
- 8 December – Brian McClair, international footballer and coach
- 22 December – Bryan Gunn, international footballer and coach
- Anya Gallaccio, installation artist
- Don Paterson, poet, writer and jazz musician

== Deaths ==
- 3 March – James Stevenson, Lord Stevenson, judge and Unionist Party (Scotland) MP (born 1883)
- 22 July – Donald Campbell, Roman Catholic Archbishop of Glasgow (born 1894)
- 16 August – Joan Eardley, landscape painter (born 1921)
- 9 September – Duncan Walker, footballer (born 1899)
- 22 November – Mary Findlater, novelist (born 1865)

== The arts ==
- 2 January – Traverse Theatre opens in Edinburgh
- 3 January – The Beatles open their first tour of 1963 with a performance in Elgin
- English painter Norman Adams acquires a summer home on Scarp

== See also ==
- 1963 in Northern Ireland
