= Pabay =

Scottish island just off the coast of Skye

Pabaigh (Gaelic)

Location
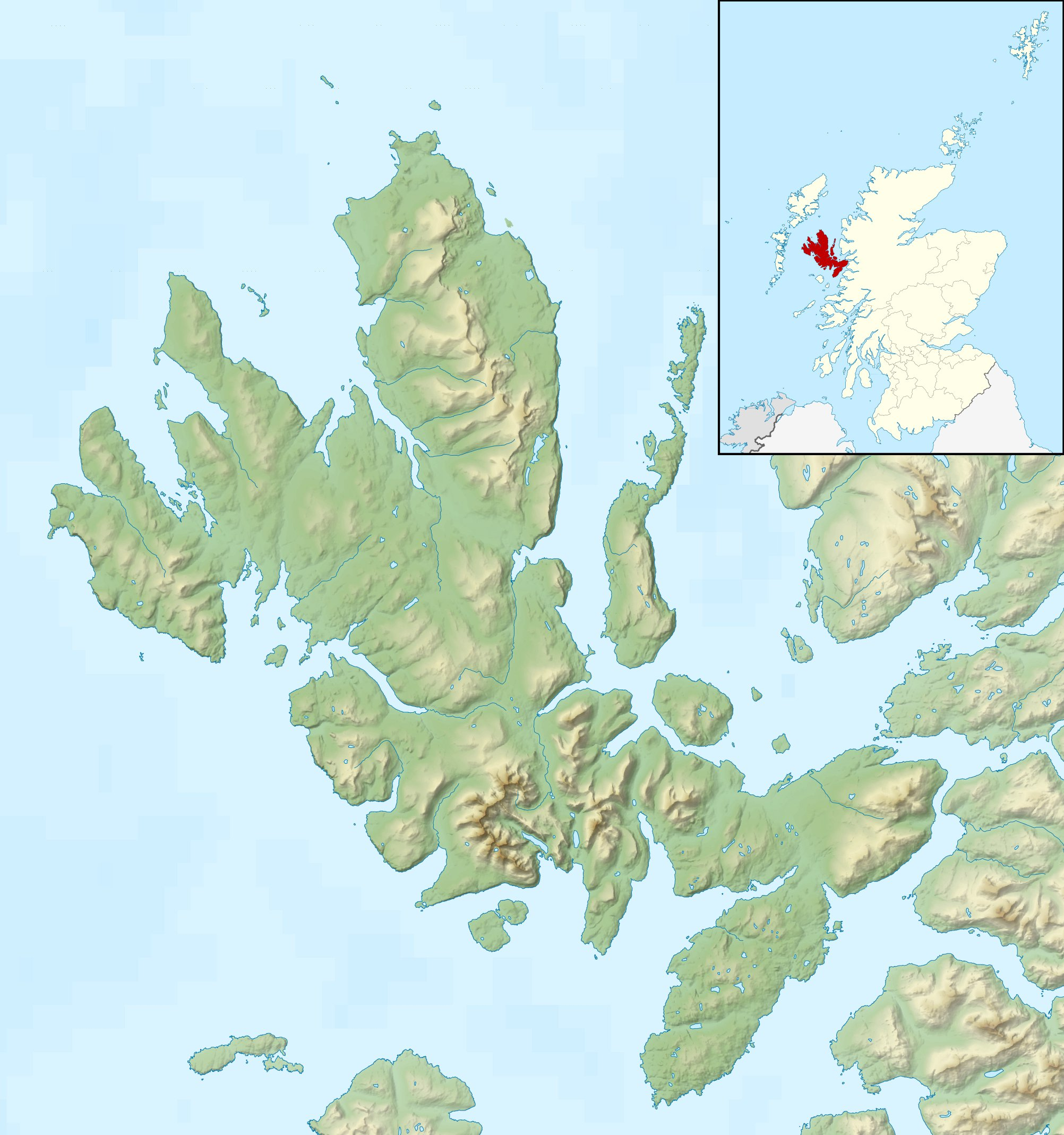
- Pabay shown relative to Skye
- OS grid reference: NG674271
- Coordinates: 57.28°N 5.86°W

Name
- Name meaning: Island of the papar
- Old Norse name: Papey

Physical geography
- Island group: Isle of Skye
- Area: 122 ha (1/2 sq mi)
- Area rank: 136
- Highest elevation: 28 m (92 ft)

Administration
- Council area: Highland
- Country: Scotland
- Sovereign state: United Kingdom

Demographics
- Population: 0

Pabay is a Scottish island just off the coast of Skye. The name Pabay is derived from an old Norse word meaning "priest's isle" and there are the remains of a 13th-century chapel.

== Geography ==
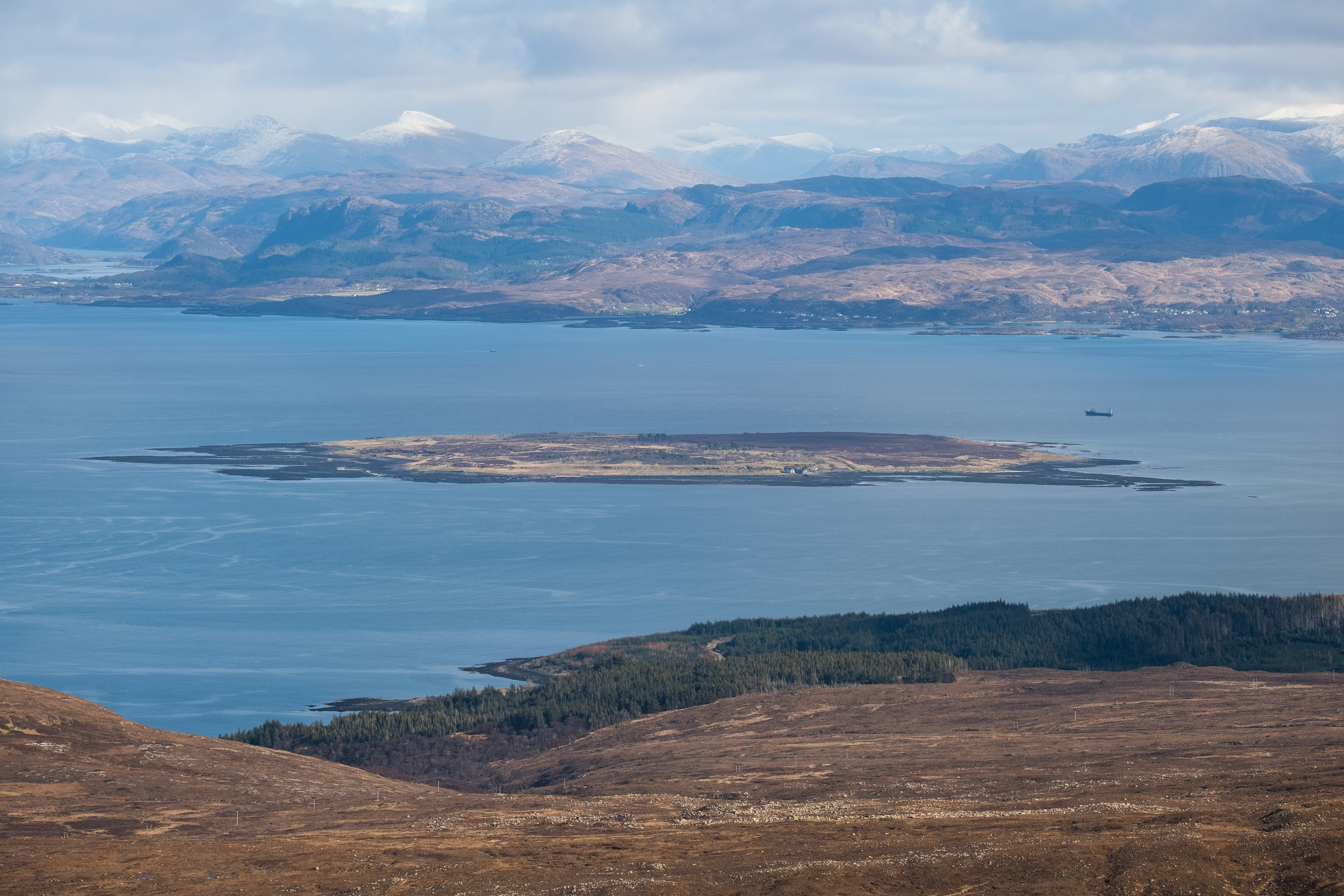
Pabay as seen from Beinn na Cro on Isle of Skye

Pabay is an island in the Inner Sound of Skye, lying 2 1/2 miles (4 kilometres) north of Broadford. It lies south of Longay and east of the larger Scalpay. Like most others of the name, is a low grassy island. It is 360 acres (150 hectares) in size, diamond-shaped and predominantly flat. The highest point is 28 metres (92 feet) above sea level, with cliffs on the North and East shores.

The island is formed of fossil-containing limestone, with some micaceous shale, named Pabba Shale. It forms a flat plateau with cliffs on the North and East shores. The surrounding low reefs encroach on its shores and double the area at low water.

The island gives its name to a group of Jurassic Sedimentary rocks which are seen across the Inner Hebredian area-Pabba Shales. These were laid down at the bottom of a muddy sea 190 million years ago. Much later (about 60 million years ago) volcanicity associated with the opening of the Atlantic Ocean led to the intrusion of molten rock along fractures running NNW-SSE across the island. The resulting dykes now stand proud as solid sheets resembling well built masonry and protecting the island from further erosion.

== History ==
Occupation of the island, in the form of midden material and lithics found in two locations, can be traced back to the prehistoric period, perhaps as far back as the Mesolithic. However, there is little evidence for settlement to bridge the gap between the Mesolithic and the sixteenth century. From this period onwards, the island is shown on maps and charts, being first named on Dutch cartographer Willem Blaeu's map of 1654.

Dean Monro in 1549 gave the following description:

At the shore of Skye foresaid, lies an isle called Pabay, near one mile in length, full of woods, good for fishing, and a main shelter for thieves and cut-throats, it pertains to Mackinnon.

In the 18th century, Scottish author Martin Martin provided the following description of the island in his seminal work A Description of the Western Islands of Scotland:

"A League further North lies the Isle Pabhay, about two Miles in Circumference, it excels in Pasturage, the Cows in it afford near double the Milk that they yield in Skie. In the Dog Days there is a big Flye in this Isle, which infests the Cows, makes them run up and down, discomposes them exceedingly, and hinders their Feeding, insomuch that they must be brought out of the Isle, to the Isle of Skie; this Isle affords abundance of Lobsters, Limpets, Wilks, Crabs, and ordinary Sea Plants""

Pabay was described by Hugh Miller, the early Victorian and missionary as "the only piece of flat, level England in the entire landscape" (of Skye).

Ruins of a chapel exist on the island. It is not certain to what saint the church was dedicated. Of it nothing exists but the foundations its external length was only 21 feet (6.4 metres). There is difficulty in determining the precise limits of the burying-ground, but it seems to have included two other buildings, the most preserved of which is a curious semicircular structure rudely and somewhat irregularly formed of uncemented stones of large size, and measuring nine feet (2.7 m) from north to south, and six feet (1.8 m) from east to west. In local speech it is the Altar, but whether of Christian or Pagan dedication, no one presumes to know. In the centre of it is an irregular circle of stones, smaller than those without, and on the south the enclosing wall of the outer building is formed lengthways of two large oblong blocks, placed a little asunder at the middle so as to leave an entrance-way between.

There is now a single occupied farm on the west side of the island, which has been in existence since at least the 1860s. The jetty, which first appears on the OS Second edition map (1904), lies at the south-western corner of the island; it is also possible to anchor off this point, while the beacon Sgeir Gobhlach appears on the First edition map (1882). A cluster of roofed and unroofed buildings is shown at the head of the jetty on the OS First edition map (1882), while a sheep pen is depicted on the current edition in this location. It issues its own postage stamps.

== Flora and Fauna ==
Pabay consists of heath, dry grassland, herb marsh, salt marsh, woodland remnants and 75 acres (30 hectares) of newly planted deciduous and coniferous trees, containing 17 different species. There are 32 different species of wild flowers, 49 different herbs, 40 different grasses, sedges, ferns and rushes. There are also numerous resident otters, seals, 32 breeding bird species and 72 non-breeding birds. There is also a large rabbit population and a smaller population of shrews.

== Art ==
"Cricket on Pabay" is a painting by Elizabeth Edenborough.

== Stamps ==
Pabay has issued private carriage labels since at least the 1960s.

== Images ==
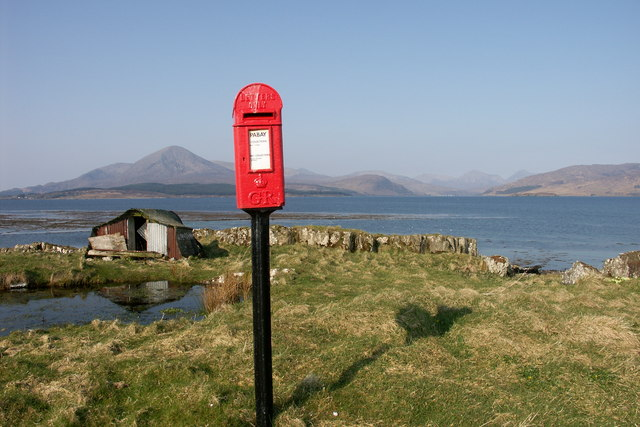

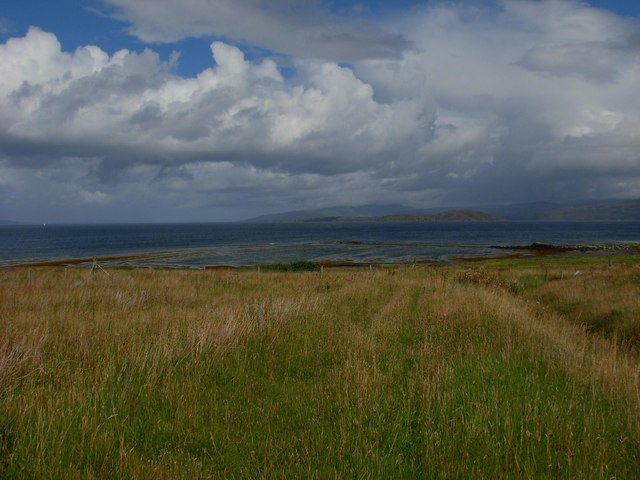

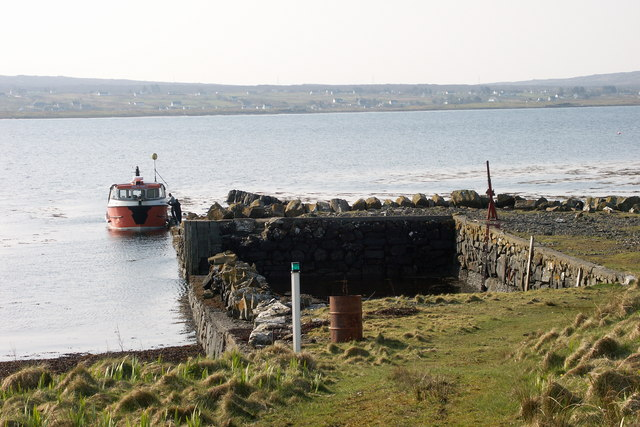

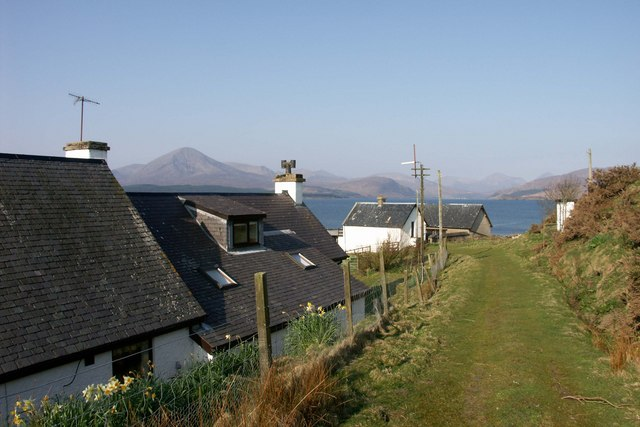

== See also ==
- List of islands of Scotland
