= 1999 in Scottish television =

This is a list of events in Scottish television from 1999.

== Events ==
=== January ===
- 20 January – The UK government says no political pressure was applied to the BBC over its decision not to give Scotland a separate version of the Six O'Clock News.

=== April ===
- 30 April – Launch of the digital channel S2, the Scottish equivalent of ITV2.

=== May ===
- 6–7 May – Television coverage of the 1999 Scottish Parliament general election.
- 12 May – The Scottish Parliament meets in Edinburgh for its first session. Proceedings have been televised from the outset.

=== June ===
- 6 June – The final edition of political current affairs programme Scottish Lobby is broadcast on BBC2 Scotland.

=== October ===
- 1 October – Death of Lena Zavaroni, the Scottish child singer and television presenter.
- 4 October – Launch of Newsnight Scotland, the BBC Scotland opt-out of the main Newsnight programme on BBC Two.
- 31 October – Establishment of TeleG, Scotland's first daily Gaelic language digital channel.

=== November ===
- 8 November – Border Television drops its famous 'chopsticks' logo which it had used since it launched in 1961 when it adopts the ITV 'hearts' idents.

== Debuts ==
=== BBC ===
- 13 January – Chewin' the Fat on BBC One Scotland (1999–2002)
- 4 October – Newsnight Scotland on BBC Two Scotland (1999–2014)

== Television series ==
- Scotsport (1957–2008)
- Reporting Scotland (1968–1983; 1984–present)
- Scotland Today (1972–2009)
- Sportscene (1975–present)
- The Beechgrove Garden (1978–present)
- Grampian Today (1980–2009)
- High Road (1980–2003)
- Taggart (1983–2010)
- Crossfire (1984–2004)
- Wheel of Fortune (1988–2001)
- Win, Lose or Draw (1990–2004)
- Telefios (1993–2000)
- Only an Excuse? (1993–2020)

== Ending this year ==
- 6 April - Machair (1993–1999)
- 3 December – Fun House (1989–1999)

== Deaths ==
- 1 October – Lena Zavaroni, 35, child singer and television presenter

== See also ==
- 1999 in Scotland
