= Sons of the Most Holy Redeemer =

Sedevacantist organization

Coordinates: 59°9′6.12″N 2°35′12.2″W

- Congregation of the Sons of the Most Holy Redeemer
- Filii Sanctissimi Redemptoris
- The general seal of the FSSR
- Abbreviation: FSSR
- Formation: 2 August 1988; 38 years ago
- Type: Sedevacantist religious institute
- Legal status: Excommunicated
- Headquarters: Golgotha Monastery, Papa Stronsay, Scotland
- Rector major: Bishop Michael Mary
- Website: papastronsay.com

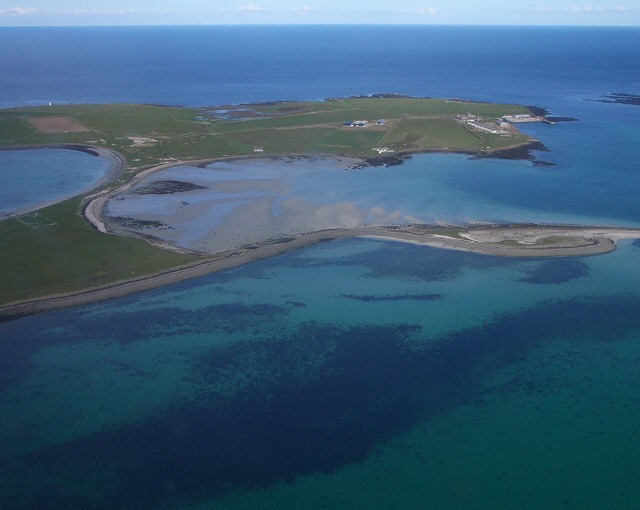
Papa Stronsay from the air. The Golgotha Monastery of the Sons of the Most Holy Redeemer can be seen in the top right

The Congregation of the Sons of the Most Holy Redeemer (Latin: Filii Sanctissimi Redemptoris; FSSR), commonly known as The Sons and The Transalpine Redemptorists, are a sedevacantist religious institute.

They were formed in 1988 as a traditionalist offshoot of the Redemptorists, following a monastic rule based on that of Saint Alphonsus Liguori. In 2008, they reconciled with the Catholic Church and were later formally erected by the Catholic Church as a religious institute in 2012. The institute was canonically erected in the Roman Catholic Diocese of Aberdeen and based on Papa Stronsay in the Orkney Islands, Scotland, as well as in the city of Christchurch, New Zealand, until July 2024.

In May 2026, the Sons renounced their reconciliation with Rome and publicly declared their support for Sedevacantism. On 25 July 2026, their founder and rector, Father Michael Mary, was consecrated as a bishop by Bishop Pierre Roy, a sedevacantist, without express Vatican approval. After doing so, Bishop of Aberdeen Hugh Gilbert declared the order's leader excommunicated for defying papal orders.

== History ==
=== Creation ===
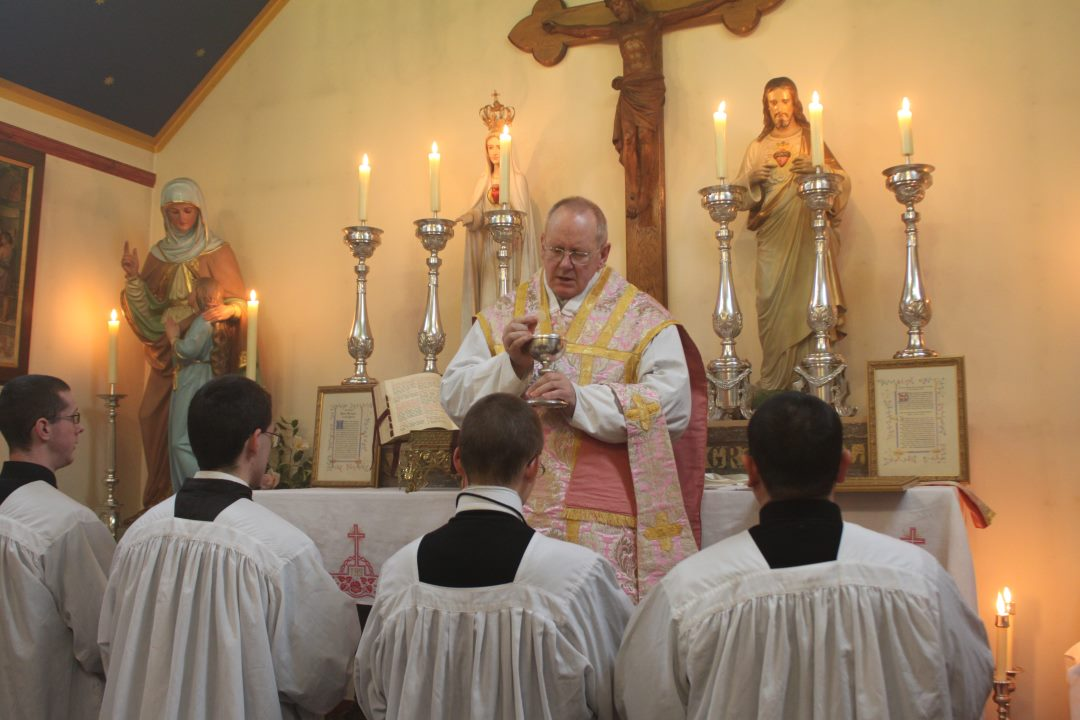
Mass on Gaudete Sunday

They were formed in 1988 under the name The Transalpine Redemptorists as a traditionalist offshoot of the Redemptorists, following a monastic rule based on that of Saint Alphonsus Liguori.

Originally based at the Monastery of the Sorrowful and Immaculate Heart of Mary on the Isle of Sheppey, Kent, they moved to the Mother of Perpetual Succour Monastery in Joinville, Haute-Marne, France, in 1994, until they bought the island of Papa Stronsay on 31 May 1999. There they established the Golgotha Monastery, and have published The Catholic monthly since 1982. They promote a Redemptorist Purgatorian Confraternity.

In July 2007 the institute established a second monastery in Christchurch, New Zealand.

=== Reconciliation with the Catholic Church ===
In June 2008, the community petitioned the Holy See for reconciliation and this was accepted by Pope Benedict XVI who declared them to be in "canonical good standing" within the Catholic Church. The motu proprio Summorum Pontificum was the main incentive which caused the community to reconsider their position. Most of the members accepted the move, while a remnant continue to be affiliated with the SSPX. They changed their official name to The Sons of the Most Holy Redeemer (FSSR), and made alterations to their religious habit in order to more clearly differentiate themselves from that of the Redemptorists. However, they were not canonically established as a religious institute and thus their faculties for celebrating Mass were for some years restricted to the islands of Papa Stronsay and Stronsay.

On 15 August 2012, the community of fifteen was granted canonical recognition as a clerical institute of diocesan right by Hugh Gilbert, Bishop of Aberdeen. In June 2013, the congregation celebrated the ordination in Rome of two of its members. During 2017 another small community was established at Kakahu by the Christchurch monastery.

On 7 October 2020, the community was invited to establish a monastery in the Diocese of Great Falls–Billings, Montana, US.

In 2023, a New Zealand journalistic investigation suggested abuse within the community, including multiple exorcisms being conducted on children without the approval of the local Bishop. Shortly after, Michael Gielen, Bishop of Christchurch suspended all exorcisms in the Diocese. The Rector Major of the order responded to all the accusations and denied them. He specifically stressed that no exorcisms without the approval of the bishop were performed, that none of two involved minors, and that certain allegations concerned a priest who was not a member of their community.

The Bishop of Christchurch on 13 July 2024 disallowed priests of the Sons of the Most Holy Redeemer to minister in the Diocese of Christchurch.

=== Sedevacantism and episcopal consecration ===
On 2 May 2026 the community released a 21-page letter in which they rejected the Second Vatican Council and declared that the popes since the council have been illegitimate.

On 18 June 2026, they announced that the founder and rector of the community, Fr Michael Mary, would be consecrated bishop by Bishop Pierre Roy, a Sedevacantist Thuc-line bishop, based in Eastern Canada. The consecration took place on 25 July 2026, with Bishops Rodrigo Ribeiro da Silva and Fernando Altamira acting as co-consecrators. The consecration was streamed online. The Bishop of Aberdeen published a statement discouraging any faithful from attending the consecration which would be celebrated without a papal mandate. The Bishop of Aberdeen announced that the leader of the community was excommunicated.

== See also ==
- Catholic Church in Scotland
- List of monastic houses in Scotland
