= Inner Sound, Scotland =

Inner Sound
- An Lighe Rathairseach (Scottish Gaelic)
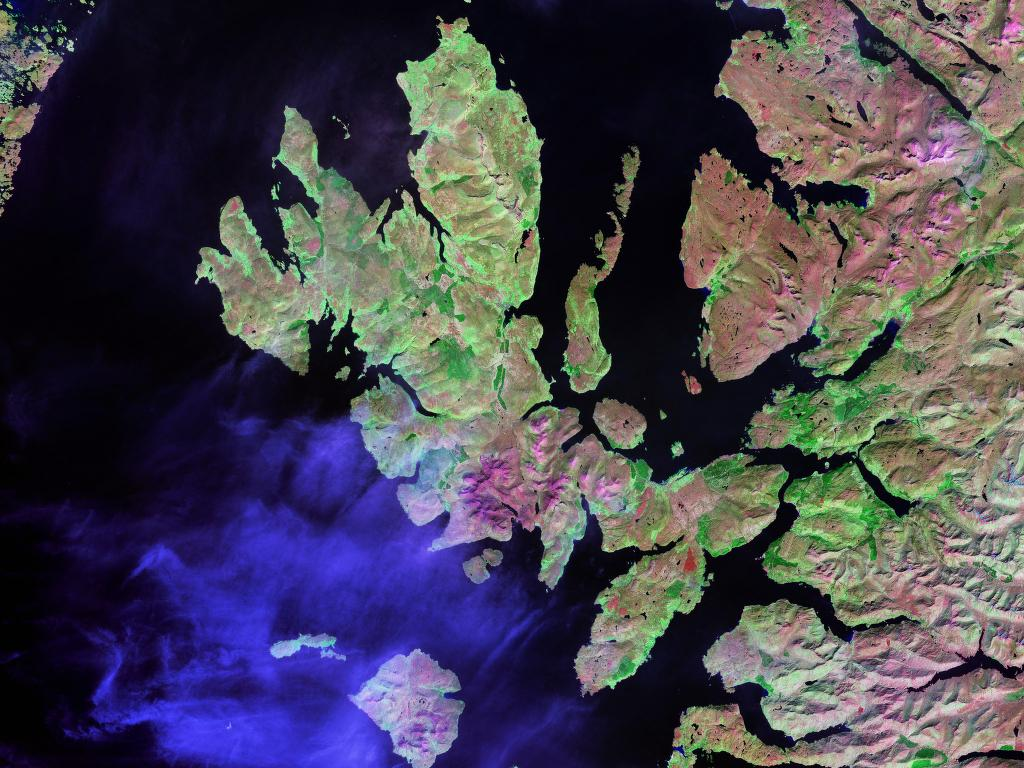
- The Inner Sound lies between the thin finger of Raasay Island and the Scottish mainland to the right of centre in this Landsat view.

- Location within Scotland
- Coordinates: 57°25′00″N 05°55′59″W
- Type: Sound
- Max. depth: 324 metres (1,063 ft)
- Frozen: No
- Islands: South Rona; Raasay; Scalpay; Pabay; Longay; Crowlin.

The Inner Sound (Scottish Gaelic: An Lighe Rathairseach) is a sound separating the Inner Hebridean islands of Skye, Raasay and South Rona from the Applecross peninsula on the Scottish mainland. The Inner Sound is the location of BUTEC, a Royal Navy submarine sensor and emissions range.

== Deepest Point in the UK ==
The Inner Sound includes the deepest section of the UK's territorial waters, with a maximum depth of 324 metres (1,063 feet). An area, over 1 1/2 mi (2.4 km) long and up to 1/4 mi (400 m) wide, exists below a depth of 960 ft (290 m), with a relatively flat bottom. There is another cleft 828 ft (252 m) deep, separated from the deeper bowl by an area of shallower water. A dive to examine the deeper trench found the bottom to be made up of bioturbated mud, with a steep slope towards the west of up to 60°.

== Islands in the Strait ==
- South Rona
- Raasay
- Scalpay
- Pabay
- Longay
- Crowlin

== Wildlife ==
In 2020, over a hundred eggs belonging to the critically endangered flapper skate were discovered in the strait. This led to calls for the government to protect the area from trawling and dredging. In 2021, a new Marine Protected Area in the strait for flapper skate was announced. It was Marine Scotland's second designation of an urgent Marine Protected Area using the powers contained within the Marine (Scotland) Act 2010. The urgent marine conservation order came into force on 17 March 2021 and prohibits access to the area for a number of marine activities, including fishing, diving and construction, for an initial period of twelve months.

== Archaeology ==
Between 1999 and 2004 a large scale archaeological project was undertaken in the strait, Scotland's First Settlers. This was a survey project to locate and examine sites relating to the Mesolithic period. The entire coastline of the Inner Sound together with its islands was walked by volunteers and archaeologists. In 2002, a separate project, the Sea Loch Survey was run by the same archaeologists to survey the sea lochs of Carron and Torridon. Between both projects they found 129 new archaeological sites. These sites were recorded and out them 36 sites were shovel pitted and 44 test pitted. One major excavation also took place at Sand which was a shell midden dating to the early-mid seventh millennium BC.

== Gallery ==
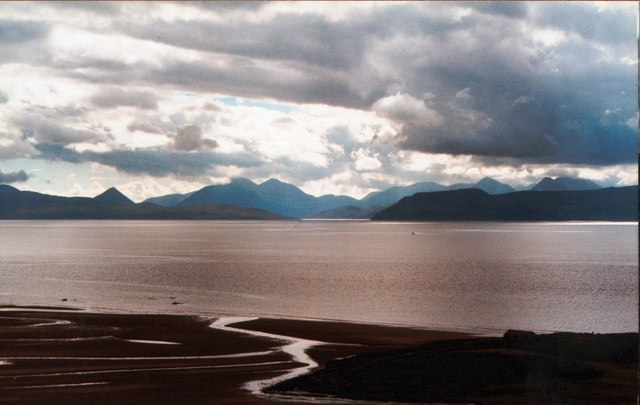
An Cruinn-Leum, Applecross

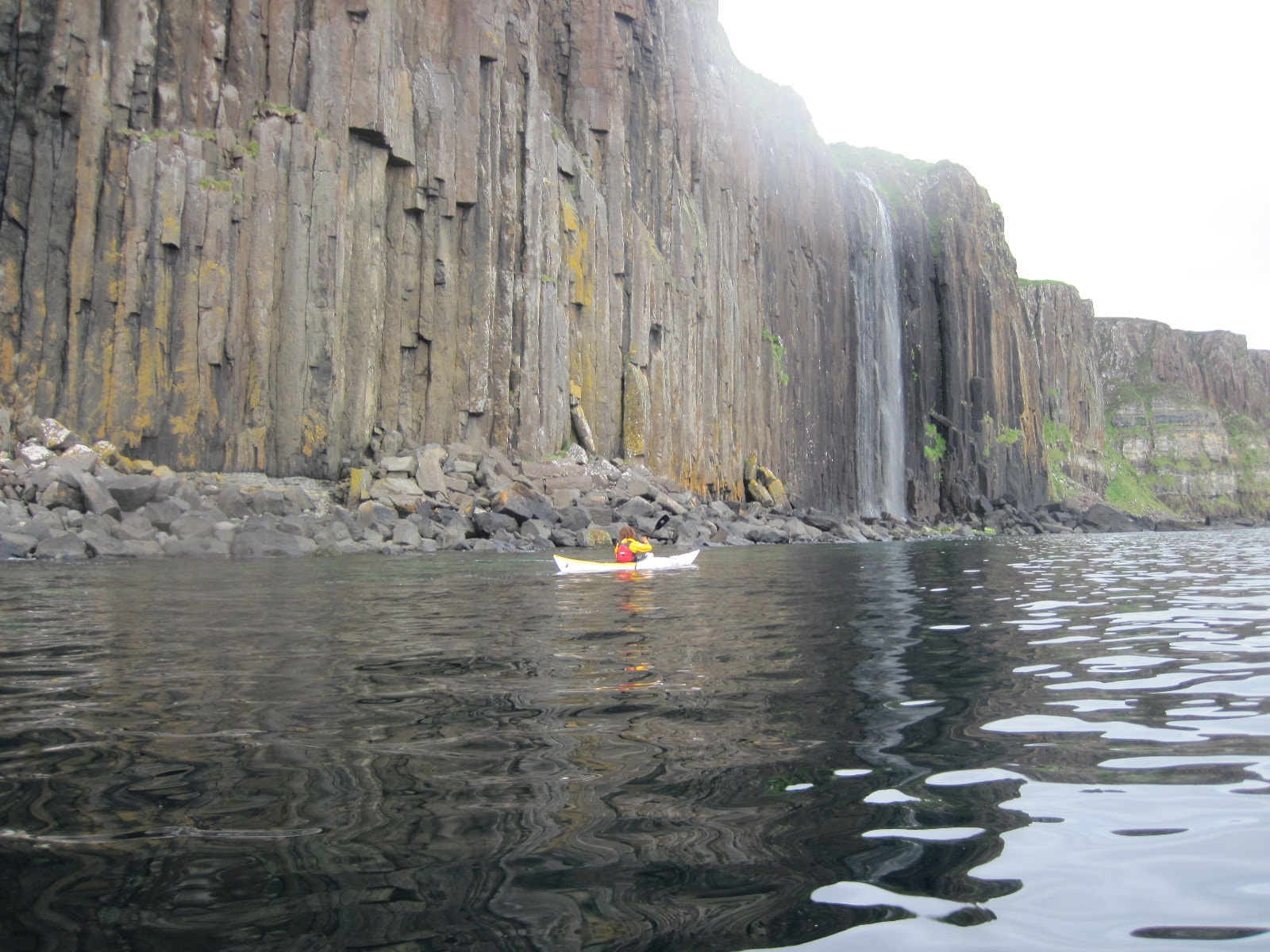
Inner Sound, Scotland

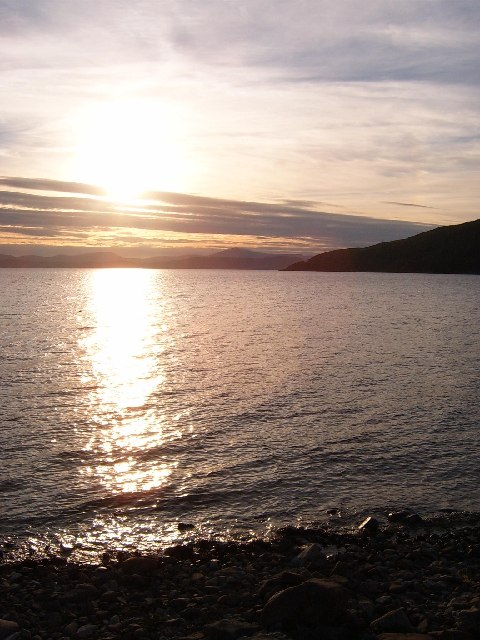
View across Inner Sound from Applecross

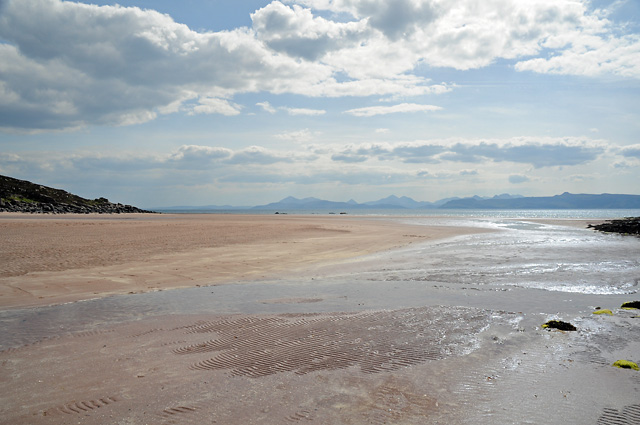
The Beach at Sand
