= Papa Stronsay =

Island in Orkney, Scotland

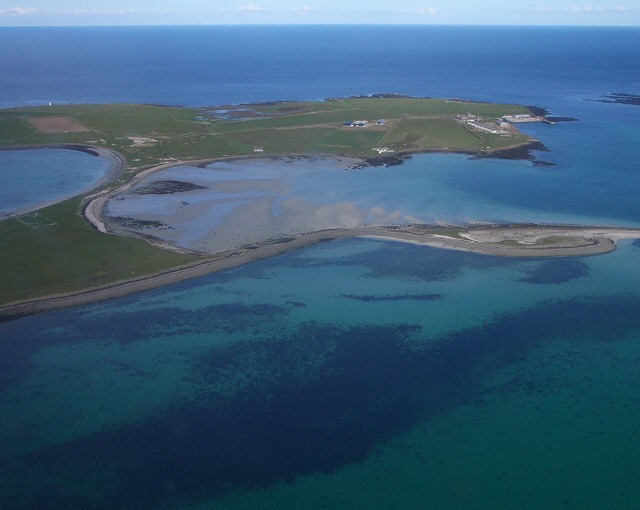
- Papa Stronsay from the air. The Golgotha Monastery can be seen at the top right.

Location
- Papa Stronsay shown within Orkney
- OS grid reference: HY666293
- Coordinates: 59.15°N 2.58°W

Name
- Name meaning: Island of the papar near Stronsay
- Old Norse name: Papey Minni/Papey In Litla

Physical geography
- Island group: Orkney
- Area: 74 hectares (0.29 sq mi)
- Area rank: 169
- Highest elevation: 13 metres (43 ft)

Administration
- Council area: Orkney Islands
- Country: Scotland
- Sovereign state: United Kingdom

Demographics
- Population: 9
- Population rank: 68=
- Population density: 12/km^{2} (31/sq mi)
- Papa Stronsay Lighthouse
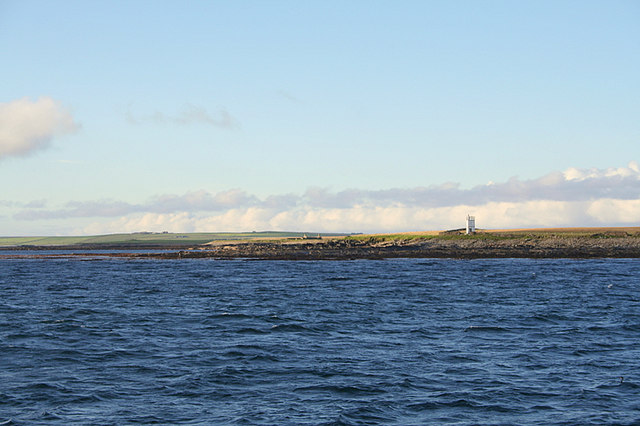
- The Light on Papa Stronsay.
- Coordinates: 59.155837°N 2.581717°W
- Constructed: 1907 (first)
- Foundation: reinforced concrete
- Construction: metal skeletal tower
- Automated: 2002
- Height: 7 metres (23 ft)
- Shape: quadrangular tower covered by aluminium panels with balcony and light on the top
- Markings: white tower
- Power source: solar power
- Operator: Northern Lighthouse Board
- First lit: 2002 (current)
- Deactivated: 2002 (first)
- Focal height: 8 metres (26 ft)
- Range: 9 nmi (17 km; 10 mi)
- Characteristic: Iso W 4s.

Papa Stronsay (/ˌpæpə ˈstrɒnsi/ PAP-ə STRON-see) is a small island in Orkney, Scotland, lying north east of Stronsay. It is 74 hectares (183 acres) in size, and 13 metres (43 ft) above sea level at its highest point. After being largely abandoned, the island was bought at the end of the 20th century by traditionalist Catholic monks of the Sons of the Most Holy Redeemer, who operate a monastery and farm there.

== Geography and geology ==
The geology is middle old red sandstone.

A thin tongue of land curls west from the main part of the island, and then south to form the Point of the Graand (a local word meaning a "sandbar"). The island, in general, is low-lying, reaching a mere 13 metres (43 ft) at its highest point.

There is an 8-metre-high (26 ft) light beacon in the north east.

== History ==
The island has the remains of two chapels and has been described as the site of the most northerly early Christian monastery ever found. St Nicholas' chapel dates from the eleventh century, and an eighth-century Pictish monastery may lie under it. The site was in a good state of repair circa 1783, but the structure was completely demolished sometime before 1795 "to provide material for a barn". St Bride's Chapel, located near to what is now the monastery, was of a similar size to St Nicholas's. It was in ruins in 1900 and all surface trace of it had vanished by 1928. Other remains include cairns, a burnt mound, and a number of abandoned crofts.

The island is one of the "Papeys" or "islands of the papar". Joseph Anderson noted that in the Orkneyinga saga "The two Papeys, the great and the little (anciently Papey Meiri and Papey Minni), now Papa Westray and Papa Stronsay, are both mentioned in the Saga. Fordun in his enumeration of the islands, has a 'Papeay tertia' [third Papey], which is not now known." (Note: William Thomson suggests that "perhaps Papay Tercia was the Holm of Papay — not a separate papar-site but a holm subsidiary to Papa Westray".)

=== Earl's Knoll ===
Earl's Knoll, or Earl's Know, is the remains of a chambered cairn constructed in the Neolithic period, likely of the Orkney-Cromarty type, located at the south east overlooking the Golgotha Monastery and the island's Bountifur pier. An excavation of the site took place in 1795 which was described as follows.

About halfway between these chapels [St Nicholas and St Bride] there is, on a rising ground called the Earl’s-know, the appearance of old ruins and graves, one of which graves, evidently defined by two stones, one at the head, the other at the feet, is eight feet and a half long (2.6 m); this grave was dug up to the deepness of about six feet in the month of July 1792; the stones at the head and feet, which appeared about one foot above the surface, reached to the bottom of the grave. Many human bones of an ordinary size were found, and, moreover, fragments of a human skull, and of a lower jawbone, with the case of teeth, which were perfectly found, and fragments of thigh bones; these were all of an enormous size and afforded a convincing proof that the body buried there had required a grave of the dimensions above specified.

The “two stones” at the head and foot would have been the dividers of the stalls in the original structure rather than grave stones as such.

=== Death of Earl Rögnvald ===
The Orkneyinga saga also records that Earl of Orkney Rögnvald Brusason was killed on Papa Stronsay circa 1046:

Earl Rögnvald resided in Kirkiuvág and brought there all necessaries for the winter; he had a great number of men, and entertained them liberally. A little before Christmas, Earl Rognvald went with a numerous following into little Papey to fetch malt, to be brewed for the Christmas brewing. The evening which they stayed in the islands they sat a long time round the fires to warm themselves, and he who had to keep up the fires said that they were running short of fuel. Then the Earl made a slip of the tongue in speaking, and said: "We shall be old enough old when these fires are burnt out," but he intended to have said that they would be warm enough; and when he noticed his blunder he said: "I made a slip of the tongue in speaking just now; I do not remember that I ever did so before, and now I recollect what my foster-father King Olaf said at Sticklastad when I noticed a slip of the tongue which he made - namely, that if it ever so happened that I should make a slip in my speech I should not expect to live long after it. It may be that my kinsman Thorfinn is still alive." At that moment they heard that the house was surrounded by men. It was Earl Thorfinn and his men. They set the house on fire immediately, and heaped up a large pile before the door. Thorfinn permitted all others to come out except Earl Rögnvald's men, and when most of them had gone out a man came to the door dressed in linen clothes only, and asked Earl Thorfinn to lend a hand to the deacon; this man placed his hands on the wall and sprang over it and over the ring of men, and came down a great way off, and disappeared immediately in the darkness of the night. Earl Thorfinn told his men to go after him, saying: "There went the Earl, for that is his feat and no other man's." They went away, and divided into parties to search for him. Thorkel Fostri with some others went along the beach, they heard the barking of a dog among the rocks by the sea. Earl Rögnvald had had his favourite dog with him. Thorkel had the Earl seized, and asked his men to kill him, offering them a reward in money. But no one would do it. So Thorkel Fóstri slew Earl Rögnvald himself, as he knew that one of the two (Earls) must die.

The armorial bearings of the Sons of the Most Holy Redeemer

The unknown writer of the Orkneyinga saga wrote that "Everyone agrees that of all the Earls of Orkney he [Rögnvald] was the most popular and gifted, and his death was mourned by many.

=== Modern era ===
A fertile island, it became an important centre for the curing of herring in the eighteenth century, but was abandoned in the 1970s.

== Present day ==
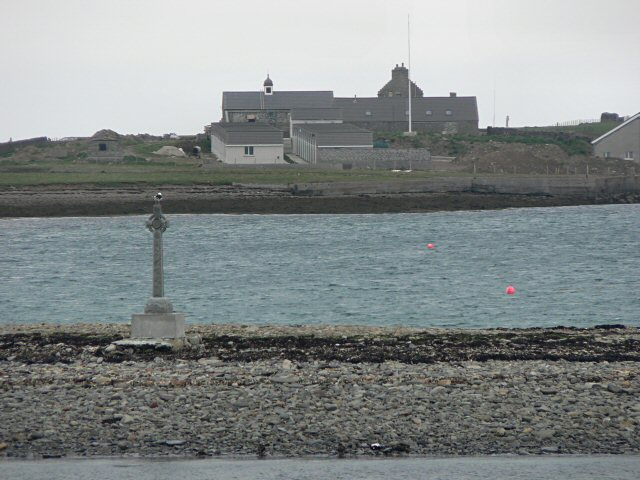
This small island in Papa Sound is attached to Papa Stronsay at low tide. Part of Golgotha Monastery can be seen in the background.

On 31 May 1999, the island was purchased from farmer Charles Ronald Smith by the monastic community of the Sons of the Most Holy Redeemer, a traditionalist Catholic religious congregation formerly affiliated with the Society of St. Pius X. In 2008 the congregation, along with most of its members, was received into full communion with the Holy See. Monks at the Golgotha Monastery, which has a working farm, hail from as far afield as New Zealand, Australia, Samoa, South Africa and Poland. The ancient monastic ruins dating back to the 7th and 8th centuries mark Papa Stronsay as a holy island and the intention is to rebuild them.

A replica of the Papa Stronsay cross is positioned at the entrance of Golgotha Monastery. The original, which is believed to date from the medieval period, was found on the island in a graveyard close to St Nicholas’ Chapel around 1850. It was taken to Melsetter House on Hoy and an image of the stone was drawn for the 1856 first volume of Sculptured Stones of Scotland by John Stuart. By 1888 the stone had been lost. Described as a "Greek cross with scroll terminals and rectangular base" the cross is featured on the coat of arms of the monastery.

In 2001 the island had a recorded population of 10 although by 2011 there were no "usual residents" living there as recorded by the census. As of March 2020 a dozen monks lived there and in 2022 the census recorded a resident population of nine.

== Folklore ==
Earl's Know is traditionally thought to be the final resting place of Sir Patrick Spens. His burial there is related by William Edmonstoune Aytoun (1813–1865), who after his retirement as Sheriff and Lord Admiral of Orkney and Shetland edited a collection of Scottish poetry. In his forward to the ballad about Spens, Aytoun wrote:

It is true that the name of Sir Patrick Spens is not mentioned in history; but I am able to state that tradition has preserved it. In the little island of Papa Stronsay, one of the Orcadian group, lying over against Norway, there is a large grave or tumulus, which has been known to the inhabitants, from time immemorial, as "The grave of Sir Patrick Spens". The Scottish ballads were not early current in Orkney, a Scandinavian country; so it is very unlikely that the poem could have originated the name. The people know nothing beyond the traditional appellation of the spot, and they have no legend to tell. Spens is a Scottish, not a Scandinavian name. Is it, then, a forced conjecture, that the shipwreck took place off the iron bound coast of the northern islands, which did not then belong to the Crown of Scotland? "Half ower to Aberdour" signifies nothing more than that the vessel went down half-way between Norway and the port of embarkation.

According to folklore, some of the Papa Stronsay natives were descended from a female selkie. This was because they had horny skin on their feet and hands, and permanently smelled of fish.

== See also ==
- List of lighthouses in Scotland
- List of Northern Lighthouse Board lighthouses
- Papa, Scotland, a list of islands named after the papar.
