= Holm of Huip =

Small island in the Orkney Islands

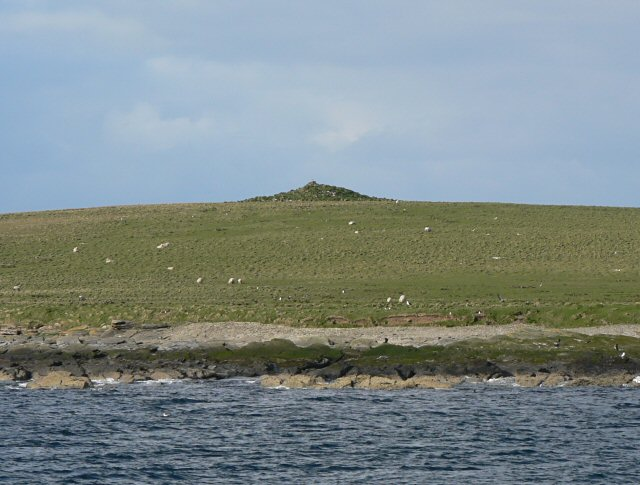
- Veltie Skerry and the cairn on the Holm of Huip

Location
- Holm of Huip shown within Orkney
- OS grid reference: HY628311
- Coordinates: 59.17°N 2.65°W

Physical geography
- Island group: Orkney

Administration
- Council area: Orkney Islands
- Country: Scotland
- Sovereign state: United Kingdom

The Holm of Huip is a small island in the Orkney Islands, in Spurness Sound to the north west of Stronsay.

The Holm has a cairn on it, and a number of grey seals.

== Geography and geology ==
Like most of Orkney, the Holm is formed from Old Red Sandstone.

It lies opposite the airstrip and Huipness on Stronsay, and separated from it by Huip Sound.
