= Linga Holm =

Uninhabited Scottish island

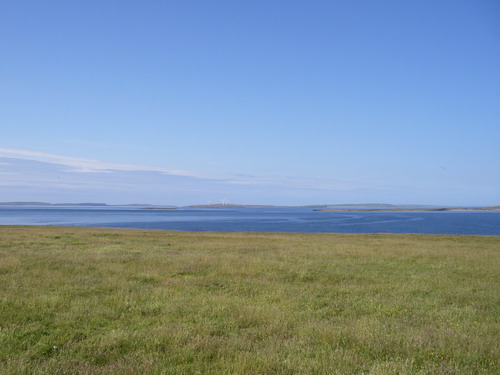
- The view north from Linga Holm, towards Sanday

Location
- Linga Holm shown within Orkney
- OS grid reference: HY615275
- Coordinates: 59.13°N 2.67°W

Name
- Old Norse name: Linga Holm from Lyngholm

Physical geography
- Island group: Orkney
- Area: 57 hectares (0.22 sq mi)
- Area rank: 187
- Highest elevation: 10 metres (33 ft)

Administration
- Council area: Orkney Islands
- Country: Scotland
- Sovereign state: United Kingdom

Demographics
- Population: 0

Linga Holm, commonly known as Linga, Midgarth and the Holm of Midgarth is an uninhabited Scottish island extending to approximately 57 hectares (0.22 sq mi) situated 700 metres (770 yd) west of Stronsay island in the Orkney archipelago. The name "Linga Holm" is derived from the Old Norse Lyngholm.

== History ==
In common with many other Orkney islands, Linga Holm contains numerous archaeological remains. These include Pictish houses and ancient cairns.

Although it is currently uninhabited, a household of six was recorded in 1841.

== Sheep ==
In 1973 the Rare Breeds Survival Trust established a refuge population here of the very rare North Ronaldsay sheep, and the flock now numbers some 400.

== Wildlife ==
It is thought to be the third largest breeding ground for the Atlantic grey seal in the world, and is an important nesting site for greylag geese.

== See also ==
- Fogou
- List of Orkney Islands
