= Pabbay, Harris =

Uninhabited island in the Outer Hebrides of Scotland

Pabbay
Pabaigh (Gaelic)

Location
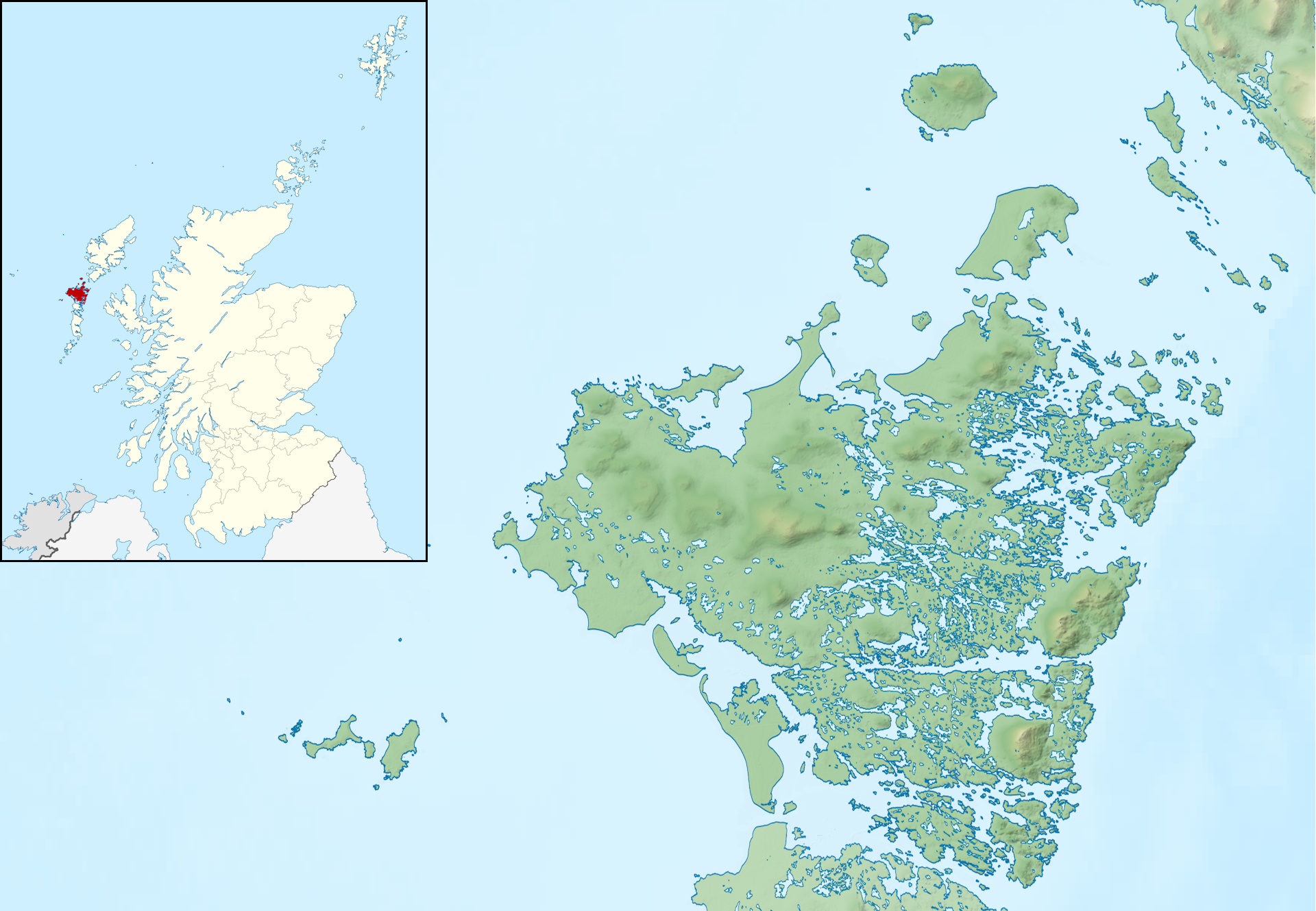
- Pabbay shown next to North Uist Pabbay shown within the Outer Hebrides
- OS grid reference: NF888876
- Coordinates: 57.77°N 07.23°W

Name
- Gaelic pronunciation: [ˈpʰapaj]
- Name meaning: Island of the papar
- Old Norse name: Papey

Physical geography
- Island group: Uists and Barra
- Area: 820 ha (3 1/8 sq mi)
- Area rank: 60
- Highest elevation: Beinn a' Chàrnain, 196 m (643 ft)

Administration
- Council area: Na h-Eileanan Siar
- Country: Scotland
- Sovereign state: United Kingdom

Demographics
- Population: 0

Pabbay (Scottish Gaelic: Pabaigh) is an uninhabited island in the Outer Hebrides of Scotland which lies in the Sound of Harris between Harris and North Uist. The name comes from Papey, which is Norse for "Island of the papar (Culdee)".

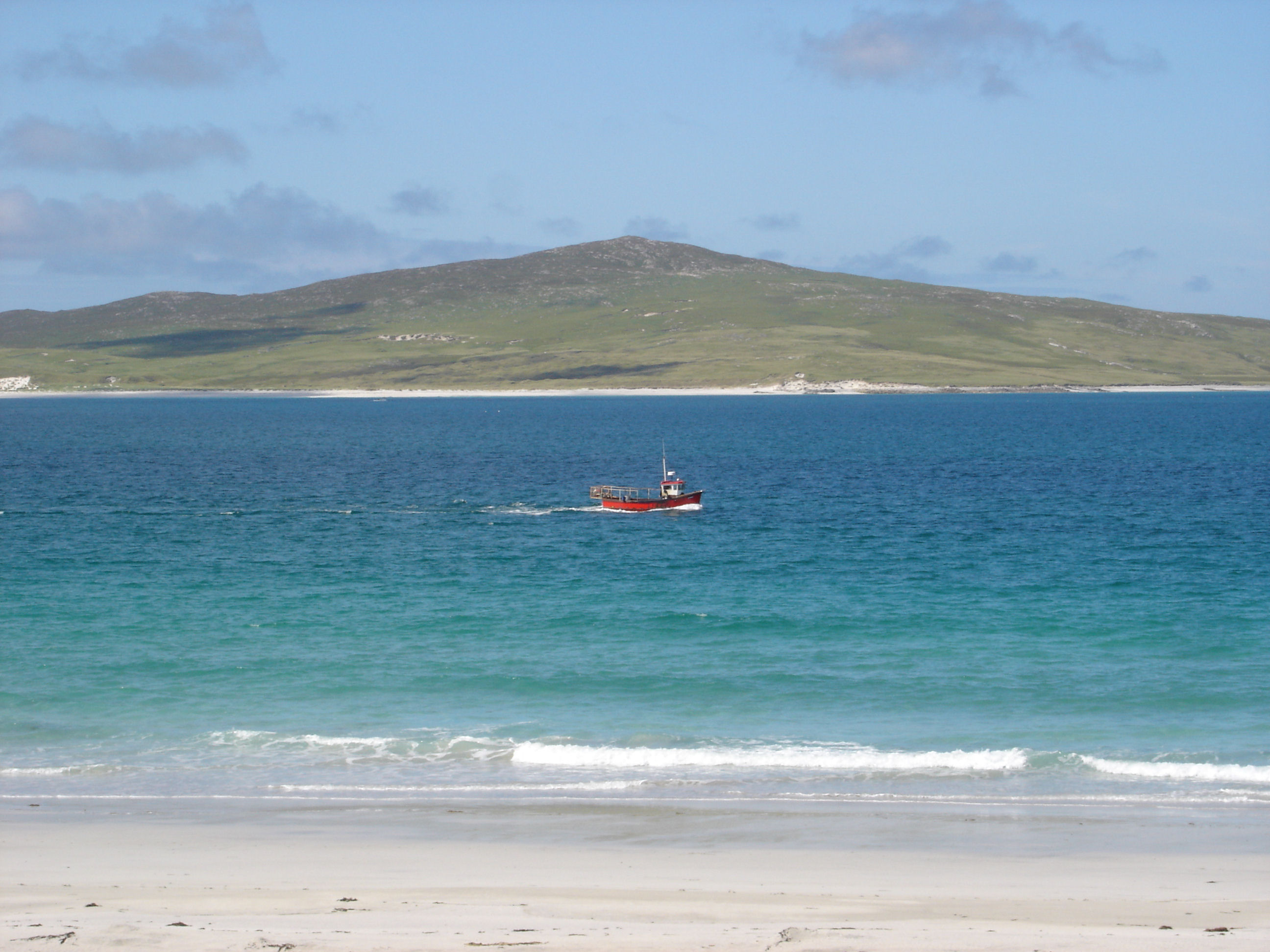

The island was once very fertile, supporting a three-figure population and exporting corn, barley and illicit whisky. Most of the stewards of St Kilda were Pabbay men. St Kilda was part of a farm with Pabbay, and the islanders paid rent to the Macleod chiefs. The island was cleared for sheep in 1846. Pabbay is traditionally a home of Clan Morrison.

Pabbay lies within the South Lewis, Harris and North Uist National Scenic Area, one of 40 such areas in Scotland which are defined so as to identify areas of exceptional scenery and to ensure its protection from inappropriate development.
