= Golgotha Monastery =

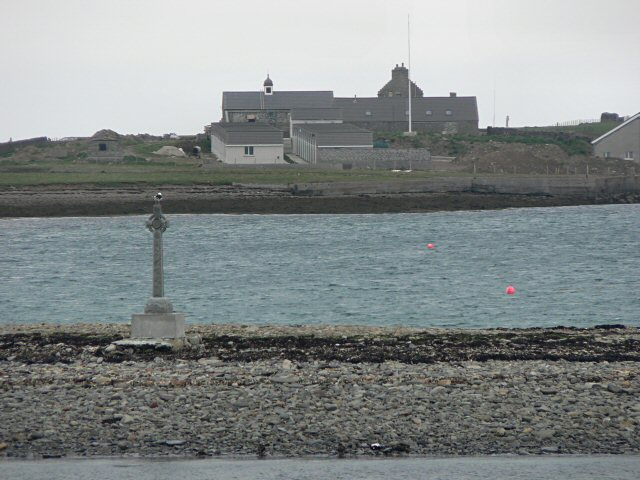
- The monastery viewed from a small tidal island adjacent to Papa Stronsay.

- 59.15°N 2.58°W
- Location: Papa Stronsay, Orkney Islands
- Country: Scotland
- Denomination: Catholic
- Website: www.papastronsay.com

History
- Founded: 1999

Specifications
- Materials: Stone

Golgotha Monastery is a monastery located on the Orkney island of Papa Stronsay. The monastery was founded in 1999, after the monastic community of the Sons of the Most Holy Redeemer purchased the island that year from farmer Charles Ronald Smith.

== History ==
After the island was purchased for £250,000 by the Sons of the Most Holy Redeemer on 31 May 1999, a congregation of Catholic monks established the Golgotha Monastery. The Sons of the Most Holy Redeemer was established in 1988 by the Redemptorist priest Michael Mary Sim, and was previously affiliated with the Society of Saint Pius X. The population of Papa Stronsay as of the 2020s is approximately 26, consisting entirely of the monks who reside within the Golgotha Monastery.
