= Papey =

Island near the east coast of Iceland

Coordinates: 64°35′30″N 14°10′00″W

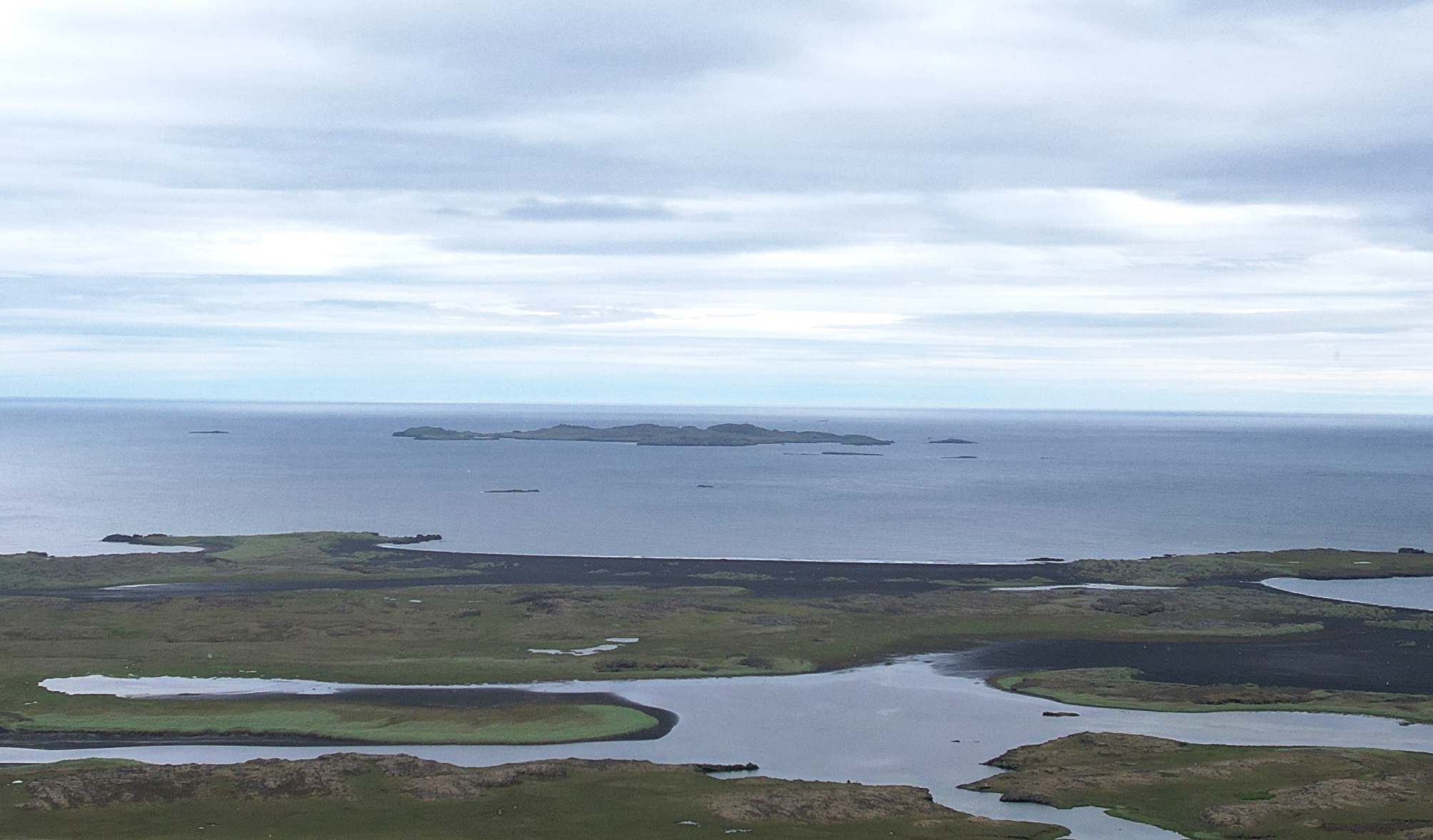
Papey seen from the air

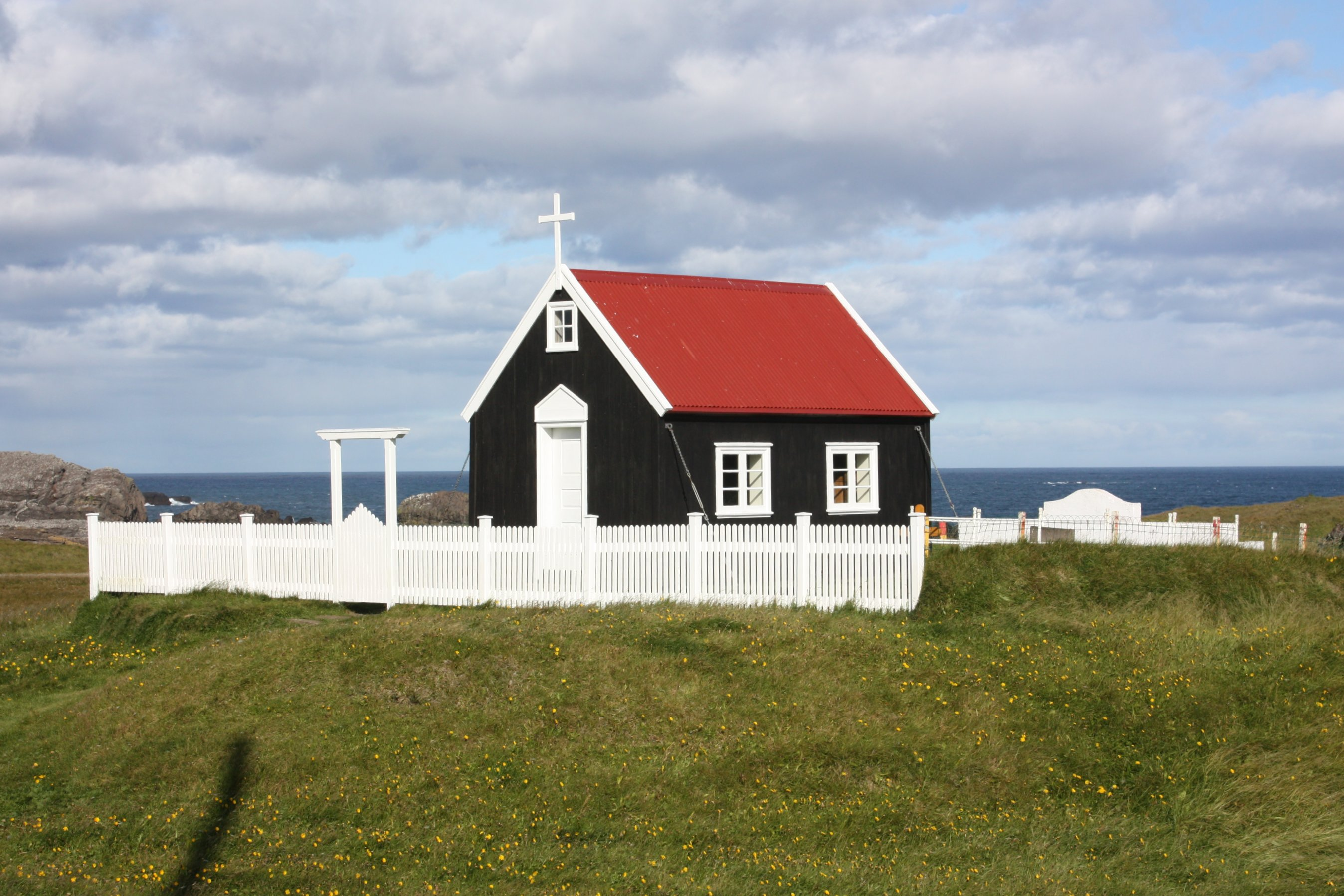
Church on Papey

Papey (Icelandic pronunciation: [ˈpʰaːpˌeiː]) is an island near the east coast of Iceland in Múlaþing municipality (formerly in Djúpavogshreppur municipality) and is about 2 square kilometres (0.77 sq mi) in extent, the highest point on the island being about 58 metres (190 ft) above sea level.

The island was inhabited from the settlement of Iceland until 1966. There still is a lighthouse, a private house, a church and a weather station on the island, the latter automated since 1998. There are also large colonies of Atlantic puffins on the island.

Papey is said to be named after the monks called Papar and it is mentioned in the Landnámabók as one of two places where these monks lived. The story in Landnámabók is that as Ingólfr Arnarson and his followers had lived during the winter at Geithellar in Álftafjörður at a distance from Papey, some of his women followers climbed a mountain in the spring and saw smoke from the island. When they later got a closer look and found special items there, they understood that the smoke had to have been from Papar (or quote: "Vestmen") inhabitants. There are also some toponyms on the island (aside from the island's name itself) indicating Papar monks were living there.

Archaeological surveys on the island and in the area surrounding Djúpavogur, especially between 1970 and 1980, did not show any evidence of any monk settlement. There was, however, evidence of Norse settlements. Some of these surveys were led by the then-president of Iceland, Kristján Eldjárn.
