= Scalpay, Inner Hebrides =

Island in the Inner Hebrides of Scotland

Scalpay
Sgalpaigh (an t-Sratha) (Gaelic)

Location
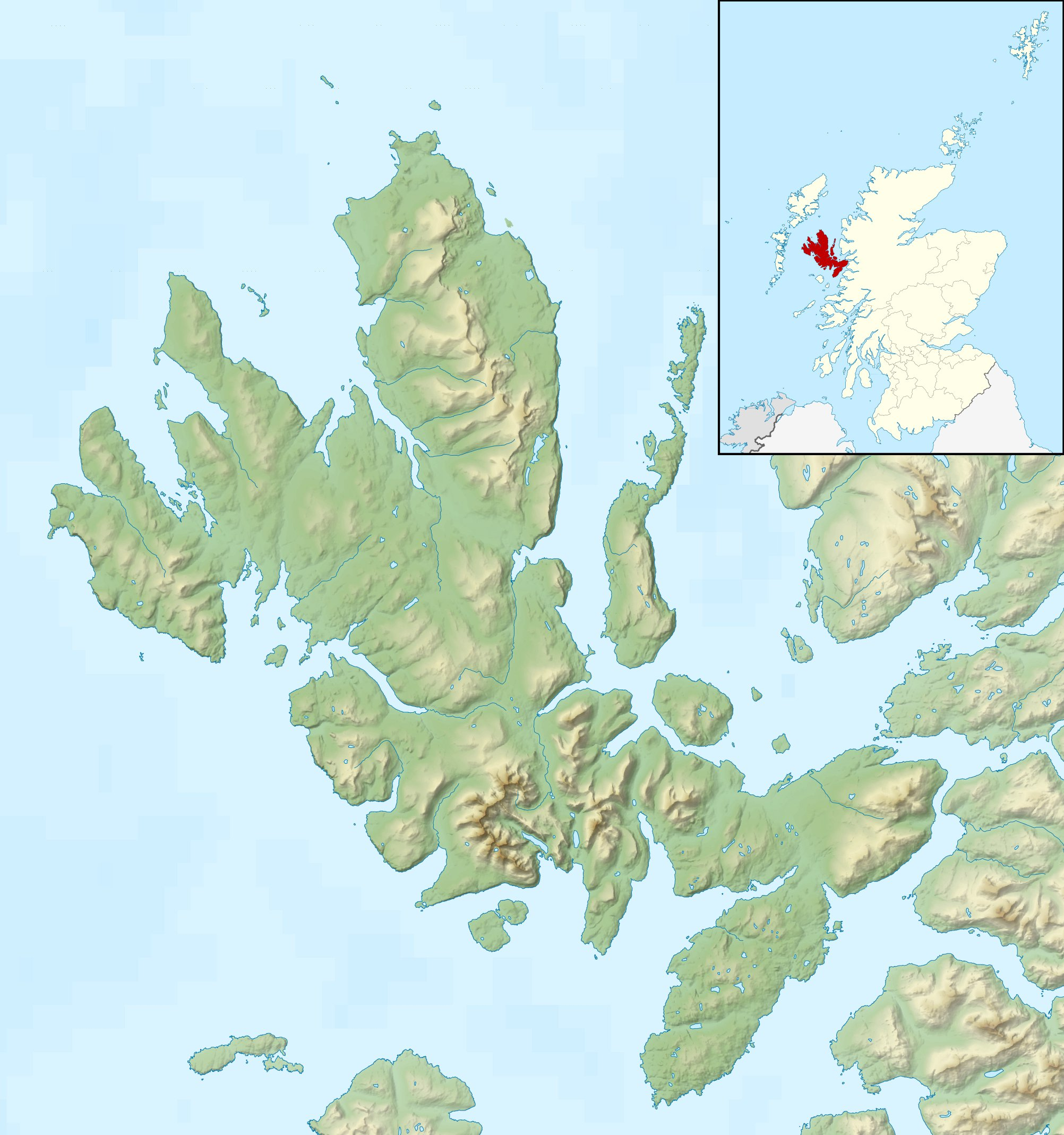
- Scalpay shown relative to Skye
- OS grid reference: NG605315
- Coordinates: 57.31°N 5.98°W

Name
- Gaelic pronunciation: [ˈs̪kal̪ˠpaj]
- Name meaning: ship island
- Old Norse name: Skalprøy

Physical geography
- Island group: Skye
- Area: 2,483 ha (9 5/8 sq mi)
- Area rank: 32
- Highest elevation: Mullach na Càrn, 396 m (1,299 ft)

Administration
- Council area: Highland
- Country: Scotland
- Sovereign state: United Kingdom

Demographics
- Population: 4
- Population rank: 77=
- Population density: 0.16/km^{2} (0.41/sq mi)

Scalpay (/ˈskælpeɪ/; Scottish Gaelic: Sgalpaigh) is an inhabited island in the Inner Hebrides of Scotland which has a population of 4.

== Geology ==
The bedrock of Scalpay is largely the Neoproterozoic age sandstone and conglomerates of the Sithean Glac an Ime Member of the Applecross Formation and in the west, the Mullach nan Carn members of the Diabaig Formation, a unit of the Torridon Group, or informally the Torridonian sandstone. Outcrops of hornfelsed basalt of the Palaeocene age Skye Lava Group and the Palaeogene age Scalpay granite are found in the south and west of Scalpay. The Scalpay Sandstone and Pabay Shale formations found in the southeast of the island around Scalpay House are assigned to the Lias Group. The Staffin Shale and Staffin Bay formations are of late Jurassic age and found east of Rubha Aosail Sligneach at Caolas Scalpay. Quaternary deposits are represented by peat in the north, present day marine deposits and raised marine deposits along the southwestern shore and a restricted area of glacial till in the interior.

== Geography ==
Separated from the east coast of Skye by Loch na Cairidh, Scalpay rises to 396 metres (1,299 ft) at Mullach na Càrn. It has an area of just under 25 square kilometres (9 1/2 sq mi). The island had a population of ten usual residents in 2001 and of four in 2011.

Scalpay is privately owned and operates a red deer farm, shooting estate and holiday cottages. Much of Scalpay is covered with heather, while other areas are conifer forestry plantations.

== Etymology ==
Mac an Tàilleir (2003) suggests the name derives from "ship island" from the Norse. However, Haswell-Smith states that the Old Norse name was Skalprøy, meaning "scallop island".

== Prehistory and archaeology ==
Between 1999 and 2004 a large scale archaeological project, Scotland's First Settlers, was undertaken in the Inner Sound to locate and examine sites relating to the Mesolithic period in the strait. The entire coastline of the Inner Sound together with its islands was walked by volunteers and archaeologists. On Scalpay they found 9 lithic scatters. All of these sites were prehistoric but only three of the sites contained microliths, which confirms them as Mesolithic.

== History ==
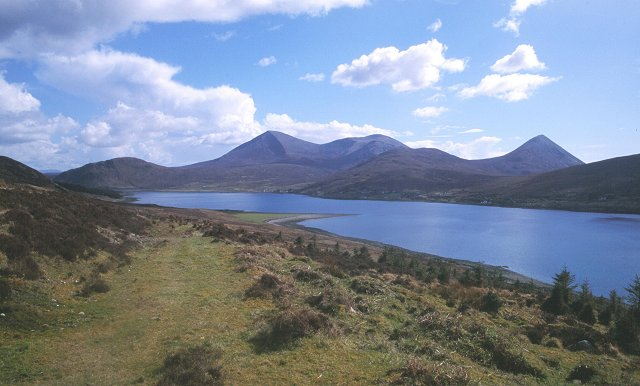
Looking south to Skye from Scalpay.

Dean Monro gave the following description of Scalpay in 1549:

...a fair hunting forest, full of deer, with certain little woods and small towns, well inhabited and manured, with many strong coves, good for fishing, in heritage it pertains to Maclean of Duart.

By the time of Dr Johnson's tour, the island was held by a tenant of Sir Alexander Macdonald.

Shipping magnate and politician Donald Currie owned the island in the late 19th century and was responsible for the construction of the first roads and much tree planting.

== See also ==
- List of islands of Scotland
