= Deimantas Narkevičius =

Lithuanian filmmaker and artist

- Born: 24 May 1964 (age 62); Utena, Lithuanian SSR
- Education: Vilnius Art Institute (now Vilnius Academy of Arts). Years of study 1987 – 1994.
- Notable work: The Role of a Lifetime (2003) Once in the XX Century (2004) Revisiting Solaris (2007)

Deimantas Narkevičius (born 24 May 1964) is one of the most consistent and widely recognised Lithuanian artists on the international art scene. Originally trained as a sculptor, Narkevičius has mainly worked with film and video. Employing documentary footage, voice-overs, interviews, re-enactments and found photographs, his films submit historical events to the narrative structures of storytelling and cinema. In his artistic practice Narkevičius examines the relationship of personal memories to political histories, particularly those of his native Lithuania. For the artist, history itself has become both material and methodology.

Since 1992 Narkevičius has exhibited extensively in important contemporary art venues and events worldwide, including Centre Pompidou (Paris), Museo Nacional Centro De Arte Reina Sofia (Madrid), Tate Modern (London), Museum of Modern Art (New York), Stedelijk Museum (Amsterdam). He represented Lithuania at the 49th Venice Biennale in 2001 and two years later exhibited at the 50th Venice Biennale in Utopia Station curated by Molly Nesbit and Hans Ulrich Obrist. Narkevičius's work was shown at Manifesta II (Luxembourg, 1998) and Manifesta X (St. Petersburg, 2014). Amongst his most recent solo shows are 20 July.2015 at Maureen Paley (London, 2017), Books on Shelves and Without Letters at The Blank Contemporary Art (Bergamo, 2016), Archeology of Memories at former KGB building (Riga, 2015). Narkevičius's major retrospective opens at the National Gallery of Art in Vilnius, Lithuania, in December 2017.

Narkevičius's works are a part of major private and public collections such as Tate Modern (London), Moderna Museet (Stockholm), Modern Art Museum (Vilnius). In 2008 for his achievements in art Narkevičius has been awarded the Vincent Award and the Lithuanian National Prize for Culture and Arts. His film Restricted Sensation (2011) was a nominee for the best short feature at the 2012 Silver Crane film awards.

Narkevičius lives and works in Vilnius, Lithuania.

== Biography ==
=== Childhood in Utena ===
Deimantas Narkevičius was born in Utena, Lithuanian SSR, in 1964 at the time when Lithuania was part of the Soviet Union.

In several interviews such as the 2003 interview with curator Hans Ulrich Obrist, Narkevičius reflected on the importance of films he saw in his early childhood. His first experience of cinema was watching movies with his parents in the theatre or at home on television. Films by prominent Soviet directors such as Sergei Eisenstein, in particular his Ivan Grozny, Part II (1958), which he saw at the age of five, and Bronenosec Potiomkin (1925), were among his earliest cinematic experiences that in Narkevičius's own words had a dramatic impact on him.

Though I couldn't adequately perceive what I saw, I sensed my parents' emotions. They were moved by something I myself could not yet understand, just as I did not comprehend their emotional experiences. I tried to find the elements that affected them so much in those movies. One of the earliest memories of an evening spent with my parents that I can associate with a specific work was watching Sergei Bondarchuk's shocking directorial debut, Sudba Cheloveka (1959). […] I felt sympathy for the orphaned boy Vaniushka, who had nowhere to sleep and nothing to eat, although I completely failed to comprehend the drama of losing one’s parents in the war, with my own parents sitting beside me, eyes wide open, watching the war open a void in the fate of the protagonist.

Later in early adolescence Narkevičius familiarised himself even further with the cinema of his time by seeing Sergei Parajanov's Hakob Hovnatanyan (1967), which again had a significant impact on the young artist. It was then that he became fascinated with the films produced in the studios of the Soviet republics, which revealed local identities, traditions and languages. In another interview from 2011 Narkevičius described technological and stylistic aspects of Parajanov's film that moved him as a young person:

Parajanov's short film that does not have a narrative or dialogue but the images and sound alone transported me to an entirely different age and environment unfamiliar to me. Having grown up with the tradition of realist cinema, I experienced this movie as a great leap from the films permeated by didactics and literary plot; its imagery acquired autonomous meaning and required extra effort to be understood. Parajanov's montages of basic everyday objects and fragments of 19th-century paintings have stuck in my memory as synonyms of an exotic world, a dream.

Growing up Narkevičius was often ill which meant he had to stay home. As a result, he spent a considerable amount of time watching Soviet television. The documentary material on 16mm film used on TV in the 1970s made an impression on Narkevičius, who later used the same type of film extensively in his artistic practice. Interviews were filmed with 16mm cameras and were then processed and made ready for the evening news on the same day. Since they were done in quite a rush, it provoked considerable experimentation. These films were screened and then broadcast, raising a range of possibilities for using film. Narkevičius, who grew familiar with these images, admitted to the ingenuity of their production and the effect it had on him even after many years: "I sometimes look back at them, and I see how creative they were – how creative the camerawork and the editing was".

The early influences of cinema and television describe Narkevičius's artistic style and means of production. They can potentially be seen as a factor that affected his decision of selecting filmmaking as opposed to object making early in his career. The history and context of the Soviet Union in which these early experiences were produced had become the principal subject of Narkevičius's oeuvre.

=== Student years in Vilnius and London ===
At the age of fourteen Narkevičius was sent to Vilnius by his parents to study at the art boarding school where he matured surrounded by students who came from similar backgrounds. According to the artist, during this period in the Soviet Union everything was quite impersonal, and at the beginning of his artistic career, he tried to personalise what he was doing to motivate himself. Artists at that time were seen as advertisers for the regime – which compared with post-war Stalinism was relatively liberal. However, the primary purpose of artists was still to provide an ideological service, which they always had to be prepared for.

After finishing secondary school at the age eighteen, Narkevičius worked for a year and a half in a museum that exhibited a collection of Soviet art. In an interview with Melissa Gronlund, he admitted that he was amazed at how funny the artwork was to him. Later, in 1987, Narkevičius enrolled in Vilnius Art Institute (now Vilnius Academy of Arts) where he chose to study sculpture. The academy's curriculum was rigid and did not excite him as much as he would have expected. In his own words, prominent Lithuanian expatriate artists Jonas Mekas and George Mačiūnas meant more to him than any teacher he had at that time.

Between 1992 and 1993, while still a member of the Vilnius Academy of Arts, Narkevičius lived in London, UK. In England, he explored the possibilities of object making and approaching the medium from a conceptual standpoint. London was an exciting place to be for the emerging artist. This period, which was marked by intensive learning, had a significant impact on Narkevičius's understanding of contemporary art as he was exposed to London's art milieu: for example, artists of the Young British Artists (YBA) generation, but more so for his motivation for becoming an artist. A dense concentration of artists and a competitive artistic climate meant that the standards for art were set high, but it also led to a strong sense of community. Artists often collaborated and helped each other in different ways. Narkevičius, who was one of them, was able to benefit from these processes.

After his return from London Narkevičius was interested in site-specific objects and continued producing sculptural works. However, after a short while, he realised that he was leaning towards storytelling and felt that he needed to find a better media for that. As a result, he began recording interviews with people from his environment. For the emerging artist, it proved to be a perfect medium for developing narratives as well as for exploring sound and visual language.

=== Film career ===
Since the late 1990s, Narkevičius has worked mostly in film and video, experimenting with film structure and thematising the weight of individual memories and personal revisions of history. The majority of his films deal extensively with the cultural legacy of Communism and attempts to erase it after the fall of the Warsaw Pact regimes in 1989 and the collapse of the Soviet Union two years later, with an emphasis on statues, sculptors, artists and moving images. These themes first emerged in his early films Europa, 54° 54' – 25° 19 (1997), Legend Coming True (1999), and Energy Lithuania (2000). A seven-minute 35mm film His-story (1998) shown at Manifesta II in 1998 gained the artist international recognition, making Narkevičius a leading contemporary Eastern European filmmaker.

In 2001, Narkevičius represented Lithuania at the 49th Venice Biennale. Two years later he came back to Venice to show his work in the Utopia Station curated by Molly Nesbit and Hans Ulrich Obrist. Describing his work's relationship with his nation's past in an interview with Obrist, Narkevičius said, "Memory is a funny thing. I think our brain has a filter: you remember what you want to remember. And you recreate the stories of the memory in a way that you want to remember them and how you would like to create them".

In perhaps his best-known film The Role of a Lifetime (2003), commissioned by UK-based organisation Art and Sacred Places for a parish church in Brighton, Narkevičius asked what it meant to be a filmmaker with a social conscience. The centrepiece of the film is an interview with British director Peter Watkins whose politically-charged, fictionalised documentary-style works had addressed the Hungarian uprising, The Battle of Culloden (1964), and the La Commune (Paris, 1871) (2000), and who had left the UK in frustration with censorship and neglect, settling in Vilnius. The interview is juxtaposed with 1960s Super-8 footage of Brighton and Hove and sketches by Lithuanian artist Mindaugas Lukošaitis of Grūtas Park, the sculpture garden 80 miles south of Vilnius where many of the country's Soviet monuments ended up after the fall of the Soviet Union. Noting that some people considered the decision to save the statues "a disaster", Watkins described the park as a place to contemplate "man's unbelievable folly and inhumanity ... and sadly, the endless repetition of history".

Narkevičius's next film, Once in the XX Century (2004) played with Lithuanian television footage broadcast across the world of the statue of Lenin being torn down in Vilnius's Lukiškės Square in 1991. Recutting it in reverse, Narkevičius showed a jubilant crowd cheering the monument as it was hoisted from the back of a vehicle onto a plinth, being reunited with its legs. In Once in the XX Century he continued to explore and contextualise the problematics of public monument and monumentality – a central theme in Narkevičius's artistic practice.

The Head (2007) consisted entirely of photographs and archival footage made for East German television. The film documents the creation of the world's second-largest head sculpture – a seven-metre-high profile of Karl Marx by Soviet socialist-realist Lev Kerbel (1917–2003) – from its conception in 1968 to its unveiling in Karl-Marx Stadt (now Chemnitz) in 1971. Narkevičius commented on his film by saying: "Objects from that period are not a crime. They are rather testimonies to historical crimes, visual heritage of an era to be kept and appreciated: if we want to feel any compassion for what the people who lived then lost, and in order to separate individuals from their creatively inhibited artworks – even if the consequences of this aesthetical repression can still be felt in the Eastern Bloc ...".

For Revisiting Solaris (2007) Narkevičius adapted the final chapter of Stanisław Lem's novel Solaris (1961), which Andrei Tarkovsky left out in his 1972 film. In Narkevičius's film Lithuanian actor Donatas Banionis reprised his role as Chris Kelvin after more than 30 years. In Revisiting Solaris Narkevičius used a series of photographs taken by prominent Lithuanian symbolist painter Mikalojus Konstantinas Čiurlionis in Anapa (now Russia) in 1905 to represent the foreign planet, as well as Eduard Artemyev's iconic score from the original film. Revisiting Solaris marked an outstanding interdisciplinary effort by the Lithuanian filmmaker to join multiple talents from different periods making it into a timeless monument.

Restricted Sensation (2011) was Narkevičius's first long feature shown in cinemas: a 45-minute film depicting the abuse of a talented young gay theatre director in the Lithuanian SSR in the 1970s, with the post-Stalinist re-criminalisation of homosexuality representing the oppressive cultural policy that took hold as Stalin assumed total power in the late 1920s. Although it can be read as a comment both on that period's homophobia and Vladimir Putin's current persecution of Russia's LGBTQI population, Narkevičius said he was not aiming to depict the explicit, illegal life of gays in the Soviet Union. Rather, the film comments on "the distrust and intolerance of what is perceived as foreign to a particular country’s culture" and was "an attempt to identify the causes of the increasing prevalence of intolerance".

His most recent work, 20 July.2015 (2016), traces the removal of several socialist realist sculptures from the Green Bridge in central Vilnius, Lithuania, which had been erected in 1952. Presented in immersive 3D – Narkevičius's first use of the medium – it culminates in the final removal of the monuments at 2 a.m. on 20 July 2015.

== Artistic work ==
=== The Role of a Lifetime ===
- Lithuania, 2003
- 17 minutes, Colour/B&W, Stereo, 4:3
- Original format: 8mm, Super 8mm and 35mm film

Deimantas Narkevičius: The Role of a Lifetime (film still), 2003. Drawing by Mindaugas Lukošaitis

It is perhaps The Role of a Lifetime (2003) that most evocatively and thoughtfully ties together Narkevičius's interests in the uncertainties at the heart of post-Soviet Lithuania with the implications of his own work in creating film and video. The film combines three distinct elements. The first one is an interview with the British filmmaker Peter Watkins that Narkevičius recorded in Lithuania. Known for his pioneering docudrama films Culloden (1964) and The War Game (1965), which politicised and fictionalised the documentary form, Watkins lived in Vilnius for many years in the course of his self-imposed exile from Britain. The second is a sequence of drawings of the Lithuanian landscape by Lithuanian artist Mindaugas Lukošaitis. A number of these drawing show Grūto Park, a kind of Soviet theme park in the south of Lithuania, that acts as a repository of Social Realist sculptures from the post-war era. The third is footage of Brighton life shot by amateur film enthusiast Geoffrey Cook which Narkevičius found in archives in Brighton.

In works like Punishment Park (1970) or La Commune (Paris, 1871) (2000), Watkins has challenged what he calls the "monoform": cinematographic editing that reduces disparate visual and acoustic parts to a narrative whole. Narkevičius undoes the monoform by putting together images and sounds that do not match each other in what appears to be a biographical documentary. The film scenes are too idyllic and too recent for the traumatic World War II childhood that Watkins recollects; a summer hum of birds and insects accompanies his description of the Soviet monuments collected in Grūto, and the pencil sketches of the park show a thick layer of snow covering the defunct socialist heroes. Maybe the wizened man in the stills is not Watkins but the protagonist of yet another history.

More dialogical than monological, The Role of a Lifetime ends up highlighting distinct bodies of work and visions: Narkevičius's audio interviews with Watkins, drawings by Mindaugas Lukošaitis (filmed by Audrius Kemežys, who catches Lukošaitis's hand), and archival footage of Brighton filmed by Geoffrey Cook in the 1960s. In his role as a master editor, Narkevičius mismatches these silent images and invisible sounds not only to question the documentary's veracity but also to begin the elusive discussion with the audience, who must put the parts together. Experiencing the gap between Watkin's eloquent remarks on creativity and Cook's quirky views of Brighton comes close to participant observation. Cook's Brighton initially appears to be part of Watkin's childhood memories, only to emerge as the eye of yet another filmmaker; in this shift the cathartic hit of nostalgia, instantly delivered by Super 8, dissolves into two visions of the past whose incommensurability makes them all the more fascinating.

As in other works, in The Role of a Lifetime, it is Narkevičius's editing of the quotidian and the unmonumental qualities of everyday life that complicate the material and bring it into dialogue with the misplaced authoritarianism of the dead monuments. Watkins's attention to reinterpreting history and continually bringing it into dialogue with the present-day – resistance to pushing the past away out of sight and mind – is mirrored in the dystopic/utopic space of the sculpture park, neither alive, nor dead, but fully both. As rendered by Narkevičius the space represents the indigestible qualities of these objects, burdened by their role as icons of a past regime. Both Watkins and Narkevičius share a profound scepticism about images that promise to be authentic representations of history. Independently of each other they have produced films with similar concerns: dismantling the conventional visual rhetoric of historic testimony and searching for a cinematic language that does not subject history to the forces of ideological assimilation or mass media commodification.

=== Once in the XX Century ===
- Lithuania, 2004
- 7 minutes, 56 seconds, Colour, Stereo, 4:3
- Original format: Betacam SP video

Deimantas Narkevičius Once in the XX Century (film still), 2004

Once in the XX Century (2004) is based on video documentation of the removal of a monumental public sculpture of Lenin from Lukiškių Square in Lithuania in 1991. The artist acquired footage from the Lithuanian National TV archive and a freelance video reporter to have a two-camera perspective on the event. These images of the figure hanging above the crowd with his hand raised have been broadcast hundreds of times by CNN and other news channels over the last decades as a symbol of the disintegration of the Soviet Union and the failure of Communism.

In Narkevičius's video, Lenin's ghost statue is reinstalled. Recutting the action in reverse, Narkevičius shows a violently enthusiastic crowd cheering a statue as it is paraded on the back of a vehicle, and raised into the air to then swing uncannily into place, as Lenin is seamlessly reunited with his legs. The demise of Eastern European socialist regimes at the end of the twentieth century led to the removal of many such monuments, taken down by either the state or the people themselves in hope for a better future. For many, this hope has not been fulfilled. Narkevičius's historical reversal ironically points to the repetition of scenes in history and talks about the longing for or denial of political and economic systems.

Once in the XX Century throws into relief the absurdity of the scene as a potential event – the public barely ever gets as wild about installing authority as it does about dismantling it. However, the video also reveals a moment of breakage in the country's history, mirrored in the ruin-image of a pair of calves and feet stranded on a plinth with no body or head. Moments of dramatic political violently break the future open to reveal an unnervingly undefined limbo. However, a violent break with the past such as this – when it is open season on the symbols of the powers just ousted – is also a moment of groundless suspension.

In 2005 Flash Art used an image of the figure of Lenin from Narkevičius's film to promote the 2nd Prague Biennale (2005). The description mistakenly said it was the statue of Lenin being removed from Kaluzhskaya Square (former October Square) in Moscow, Russia. In reality, the Lenin statue is still in Kaluzhskaya Square.

=== Revisiting Solaris ===
- Lithuania, 2007
- 18 minutes, Colour/B&W, Stereo, 16:9
- Original format: 35mm film

Deimantas Narkevičius Revisiting Solaris (film still), 2008.

In my short film, Revisiting Solaris, the actor Donatas Banionis appears in his role as Chris Kelvin again more than thirty years after Andrej Tarkovskij's Solaris was made. Revisiting Solaris is based on the last chapter of Lem's book, the part that had been left out of Tarkovskij's version. In this last chapter, Kelvin reflects on his brief visit on the "soil" of the planet Solaris shortly before his return from the space mission. As material to visualize landscape of Solaris, I used a series of photographs made by the Lithuanian Symbolist painter and composer Mykalojus Konstantinas Čiurlionis in 1905 in Anapa. Čiurlionis's works are marked by an original conception of space, producing the impression of an infinite expanse and limitless time. The pictures thus take on a quality of cosmic vision and deep inner concentration. I found it very interesting that in 1971 Andrej Tarkovskij filmed the same surface of the Black Sea in Crimea to represent the landscape of the mysterious ocean.

— Deimantas Narkevičius

Narkevičius first saw Andrej Tarkovsky's film in the 1970s. In an interview with Larissa Harris he admitted that then, when he was about sixteen or seventeen, he did not get it at all, simply not understanding what was going on in the film. Nevertheless, it engaged him and raised his curiosity. Later on Narkevičius watched Solaris over and over again. "I kept watching it until, having reached my thirties, I finally liked it a lot. Perhaps that was also due to the fact that I started to lose people who were close to me".

Out of Tarkovsky's film language, Lem's book, photographs by Mikalojus Konstantinas Čiurlionis, and Donatas Banionis, Narkevičius made another Solaris. In the same conversation, Narkevičius stressed the fact that within his film he meets Chris Kelvin and not Donatas Banionis. Revisiting Solaris is in a way an extension of the Tarkovsky's film, many years later. Banionis, who initially was not so keen on reprising his role, did not have any reflection on his role in Narkevičius's film and did not comment on the old film either. According to the artist, he simply "is" Chris Kelvin again.

In Solaris, before Banionis as Chris Kelvin leaves Earth, the old pilot Burton attacks him as "not fit to go into space" and "an accountant, not a scientist". In Revisiting Solaris, Banionis/Kelvin and an unnamed woman who is played by Narkevičius's wife say these words to the artist who in such a way himself becomes young Chris Kelvin. The difference between Tarkovsky's and Narkevičius's versions of the scene is that take-off does not happen. The image of the planet Solaris is represented as Banionis/Kelvin's memories. The mysterious planet is revisited by evoking both the memories of a man who was "there" some time ago and also viewers' collective memories of Tarkovsky's film. "There" happened in the form of a fiction film in 1972, but Narkevičius accepts it as reality.

As with his other work, Narkevičius is awaking something anachronistic, something that has gone from the everyday (or contemporary media) experience. By bringing a real man, a witness to an outstanding cinematographic achievement like Solaris by Tarkovsky, he emphasises that some dimensions of the film remain relevant. The presence of Banionis is also a link between "then" and "now", between created reality and its impact on a viewer many years later. "The man is among us, the way he moves is the same, his look is the same, so 1972 is still 'present'.”

Most of the selected locations seen in Revisiting Solaris are functional architecture from the period of radical modernisation. They are linked with the recent past, which for Narkevičius was very much about creating a future. In comparison, in Solaris, the future is represented by the beautiful shots of the roads and highways Tarkovsky took in Tokyo in 1970. Narkevičius chose the locations for Banionis to discover them. When talking to L. Harris, he said that he wanted him to establish contact with those spaces, accommodate them with his presence while being filmed. The room with two telephones, for example, is a former KGB prison, now the Museum of Genocide Victims in Vilnius where decades ago people were killed for political reasons. For that scene, Narkevičius chose an excerpt from Lem's book that talks about the nature of human thoughts. "What potential dangers can result from materialisation of some thoughts? What "phantoms" were generated by human minds in recent history?” Narkevičius rhetorically asks the viewers of his film.

== Objects ==
Deimantas Narkevičius Too Long on a Pedestal, 1994

Although Narkevičius is primarily known for his cinematographic work, he started his career working with sculpture and found objects. Narkevičius's aim to personalise the relationship between the artist and his work emerged during his study years at Vilnius Academy of Arts, as did his search for a means of expression matching the conceptual idea. It prompted him to embrace the avant-garde tradition and the principles of site-specific art. At that stage, he sought to cast off the dominant romantic concept of art and actualise other principles of visual expression that would directly and didactically reflect the thinking of the artist. His one-year stay in London was crucial in this regard because it was there that he introduced ready-made objects into his artistic practice.

Narkevičius's sculptures actively question preconceptions regarding day-to-day objects, assigning them new and indeterminate functions. He builds his creative platform by siting them in the historical context of the environment they belong to. In such a way Narkevičius creates a new semantic field to communicate his ideas via the physical form.

The work Too Long on a Pedestal was made in 1994, when the Lithuanian public was still affected by the huge political and social shifts of the early 1990s. The stagnant and morally compromised ideological system that had dominated social life for nearly 50 years was being replaced by a new one. This work, tinged with subtle humour, is a reflection on how the heritage of the political system becomes history. The means of expression selected by the artist, a pair of worn-out classic-style shoes, now filled with coarse salt, points to the statues of heroes that used to embody the value system of the former epoch, but the people promptly removed them from their pedestals, as politics changed its course.

== Filmography ==
- Europa, 54° 54' – 25° 19' (1997)
- His-story (1998)
- Mass for the Truth of Blacksmith Ignotas (1998)
- Legend Coming True (1999)
- Energy Lithuania (2000)
- Kamietis (Countryman) (2002)
- Role of a Lifetime (2003)
- Scena (2003)
- Once in the XX Century (2004)
- Disappearance of a Tribe (2005)
- Matrioškos (2005)
- The Head (2007)
- Revisiting Solaris (2007)
- The Dud Effect (2008)
- Into the Unknown (2009)
- Ausgeträumt (2010)
- Restricted Sensation (2011)
- Books on Shelves and Without Letters (2013)
- 20.July 2015 (2016)

== Solo exhibitions ==
2017

Deimantas Narkevičius, 20 JULY.2015, Maureen Paley, London.

2016

Doubled Youth, Baltic Centre for Contemporary Art, Gateshead.

Medialization of Monuments; Monumentalization of Media, Temporary Gallery, Zentrum für zeitgenössische Kunst e.V. / Centre for contemporary art, Köln.

Deimantas Narkevičius, Books on Shelves and Without Letters, The Blank Contemporary Art, Sala alla Porta Sant’Agostino, Bergamo.

2015

Archeology of Memories, Corner House, KGB former building, Riga.

Fact or Fiction, Berwick Film & Media Arts Festival, Berwick.

Sad Songs of War, gb agency, Paris.

Deimantas Narkevičius, Maureen Paley, London.

Da Capo, MSU, Museum of Contemporary Art Zagreb.

2014

Cupboard and a Song, MNAC, National Museum of Contemporary Art, Bucharest.

Sounds Like The XX Century, Galerija Vartai, Vilnius.

Deimantas Narkevičius, 60th Oberhausen International Short Film Festival, Oberhausen.

Cupboard and a Play, gb agency, Paris.

2013

Da capo, Le Magasin, Grenoble.

Da capo, Marino Marini Museum, Firenze.

Deimantas Narkevičius, Independent, gb agency, New York.

2012

About Films, Deimantas Narkevičius, Para/Site Art Space, Hong Kong.

A Tang of Lomo Film, Galerie Barbara Weiss, Berlin.

2011

Architektur und Film, Blue Box, Deimantas Narkevičius, The Head, Sprengel Museum, Hannover.

Solo film programme, 15th International Short Film Festival, Winterthur.

Deimantas Narkevičius, Restricted Sensation, gb agency, Paris.

2010

Getting a lost tune, Artra, Milano.

Darkroom Series: Deimantas Narkevičius, Turku Art Museum, Turku.

Sarabande, (with Žilvinas Kempinas), Frac Basse Normandie, Caen.

The Unanimous Life, Kunsthallen Brandts, Odense.

The Unanimous Life, Brandts Kunsthallen, Odense.

2009

Deimantas Narkevičius, gb agency, Paris.

Deimantas Narkevičius, BFI Southbank Gallery, British Film Institute, London.

The Unanimous Life, Kunsthalle, Bern.

The Unanimous Life, Van Abbemuseum, Eindhoven.

Deimantas Narkevičius, Mamco, Genève (2009/2010)

The Dud Effect, Mala Galerija, Museum of Modern Art, Ljubljana.

2008

The Unanimous Life, Museo Nacional Centro De Arte Reina Sofia, Madrid.

Jan Mot, Brussels.

Galerie Barbara Weiss, Berlin.

Genius Seculi, The Center of Contemporary Art, Thessaloniki.

2007

The Role of a Lifetime, Index, Stockholm.

History Continued, Mücsarnok Kunsthalle, Budapest.

Revisiting Solaris, Contemporary Art Centre, Vilnius.

Revisiting Solaris, Daadgalerie, Berlin.

Among the Things We Touched, Secession, Vienne.

The Documentary FilmPlatform ZONE, The Arts Center Buda, Kortrijk; The University Movie Theater Film Plateau, Ghent; MuHKA media, Antwerpen.

2006

Screening, Musée National d'Art Moderne, Centre Pompidou, Paris.

This not What you See, Gallery of Contemporary Art Bunkier Sztuki, Kraków.

Plug In, Van Abbemuseum, Eindhoven.

Once in the XX Century, Arnolfini, Bristol.

Galerie für Zeitgenössische Kunst Leipzig.

Instead of Today, gb agency, Paris.

2005

Once in the XX Century, Akademie der Kunst, Berlin.

2004

Two Sculptures, CAC, Contemporary Art Center, Vilnius.

Films screening, Tate Modern, London.

Foksal Gallery, Warsaw.

Galerie der Stadt, Schwaz, Tirol.

Deimantas Narkevičius Screenings, Roseum Contemporary art Center, Malmö.

Legend Coming True, Musée d'Art et d'Histoire du Judaïsme, Paris.

2003

The Role of a Lifetime, Art and Sacred Places, St. Peters Church, Brighton.

Kaimietis, Jan Mot, Brussels.

Either True or Fictitious, Frac des Pays de la Loire, Carquefou.

Energy Lithuania, LISTE 03, gb agency, Basel.

2002

gb agency, Paris.

Deimantas Narkevičius' Project, Kunstverein, Munich.

2001

Energy Lituania, Jan Mot, Bruxelles.

Lithuanian Pavilion, 49th Venice Biennial, Venice.

One day film and video screenings, Moderna Museet, Stockholm.

2000

8 x 16 x 35, Contemporary Art Centre, Vilnius.

1994

Unforced Reality, Akademija Gallery, Vilnius.

== Collections ==
- Musée d'art moderne de la ville de Paris (Paris)
- Frac Pays de la Loire (Carquefou)
- Fonds National d'Art Contemporain (France)
- Louis Vuitton Art Collection (France)
- Museo Nacional Centro de Arte Reina Sofia (Madrid)
- Museu d'Art Contemporani de Barcelona, MACBA (Barcelona)
- Lithuanian Art Museum (Vilnius)
- Modern Art Museum (Vilnius)
- Tate Modern (London)
- Van Abbemuseum (Eindhoven)
- Museion, Museum of Modern and Contemporary Art (Bolzano)
- Moderna Museet (Stockholm)
- The Louisiana Museum of Modern Art (Humlebæk)
- Oslo National Museum for contemporary Arts (Oslo)
- Muzej Suvremene Umjetnosti (Zagreb)
- Mrs and Mr Ruiz Picasso Collection (Paris/Malaga)
- Muzeum Sztuki Nowoczesnej w Warszawie (Warsaw)
- Hoffmann Collection (Basel)
- Museum Folkwang (Essen)

== Selected publications ==
- Lithuanian Pavilion – 49th Venice Biennial (2001). ISBN 9986957176
- The Role of a Lifetime (2003). ISBN 0954618114
- Once in the XX Century (2006). ISBN 0907738818
- The Unanimous Life (2009). ISBN 9788480263740
- Deimantas Narkevicius: Da Capo. Fifteen films (2015). ISBN 9783943620283

== Awards and honours ==
- The Vincent Award (2008)
- Lithuanian National Prize for Culture and Arts (2008)
