= 1964 in Scottish television =

This is a list of events in Scottish television from 1964.

== Events ==
- 20 April – BBC 2 Scotland starts broadcasting; the existing BBC channel is renamed BBC 1 Scotland. A power failure prevents the planned opening night's schedule from happening, meaning the first programme shown is Play School the following morning.
- 30 April – Television sets manufactured as of this date are required to receive UHF channels.
- 15 August – Scottish launches Scotsport Results to provide Scottish viewers with a round-up of the day's Scottish football. It is broadcast on Saturday teatimes, at around 5 pm during the football season.
- 15 October – Television coverage of the general election.
- 15 December – Peter Watkins' docudrama Culloden is shown nationally on BBC TV.

== Television series ==
- Scotsport (1957–2008)
- The White Heather Club (1958–1968)
- Dr. Finlay's Casebook (1962–1971)
- The Adventures of Francie and Josie (1962–1970)

== Births ==
- 13 May – Lorraine McIntosh, singer and actress
- 6 September – Stephen Greenhorn, playwright, television writer and novelist
- Unknown – Paul Higgins, actor

== See also ==
- 1964 in Scotland
