= Evening Land =

1977 film

- Aftenlandet
- Directed by: Peter Watkins
- Written by: Peter Watkins; Poul Martinsen; Carsten Clante
- Produced by: Ebbe Preisler; Ib Tardini; Peter Lorenzen; Jeff McBride; Steen Herdel; Stig Bjorkman
- Starring: Bent Andersen; Kai Schoning Andersen; Mogens Andersen; Oluf Andersen
- Cinematography: Johan Churchill; Fritz Schroder
- Edited by: Peter Watkins; Jeff McBride
- Music by: Anders Koppel
- Distributed by: A/S Panorama Film
- Release date: 21 February 1977
- Running time: 110 minutes
- Country: Denmark
- Language: Danish

Evening Land (Aftenlandet in Danish) is a 1977 Danish pseudo-documentary drama written and directed by Peter Watkins. In the film, the Danish police pursue a group of radicals who have kidnapped a government minister to support a shipyard strike.

== Plot ==
The story begins with a Danish newsreader reporting on a work stoppage occurring at the Copenhagen Shipyard. The workers are on strike because the management has proposed a wage freeze to secure a military contract with a European nation. Several strikes are happening in Europe, and several trade unions join the strike in solidarity. The Shipyard client later turns out to be France, and the order consists of four nuclear-driven submarines which can be fitted with nuclear missiles. The strike increases to 87,000 workers, and the European Ministers of Defence hold a press conference to address the situation.

At the same time, a summit meeting of European Common Market ministers takes place in Copenhagen. A group of radical demonstrators kidnaps the Danish EEC Minister. Their demands are the cease of production of nuclear submarines and power plants, the demands of the strike are to be met, and a new referendum on the EEC and NATO is to be held in Denmark.

Although the kidnappers are non-violent, the Government regards them as terrorists and puts in every resource to bring the Minister back. In the meantime, the military confirms that nuclear warheads could be expected to be operated by Danish armed forces in the future, and the European Ministers underline the need to combat Soviet expansionism. The media starts looking into the connection between the workers and the kidnappers, and the police start raiding left-wing organisations. The strike leaders are under pressure but stand firm during the next demonstration, which ends in confrontation with the police, and many of the workers are arrested. The film ends with the police locating and rescuing the kidnapped minister and capturing or killing the kidnappers.

== Cast ==
- Bent Andersen
- Kai Schøning Andersen
- Mogens Andersen
- Oluf Andersen
- Patricia Bay Andersen
- Steen Andersen
- Peter O. Back
- Niels Baden
- Carsten Baess
- Kent Bajer
- Jon Bang Carlsen
- Erling Barfoed
- Peter Bay
- Allan Beattie
- Bengt Bengtsen
- Bodil Bergmann
- Poul Bergmann
- Timme Bille

== Production ==
In October 1975, Watkins was invited by Stig Björkman, who oversaw production for the Danish Film Institute, to begin research on a feature film which was to be funded by the Institute, and private producers Steen Herdel and Ebbe Preisler. Watkins wrote the script in cooperation with Danish director Poul Martinsen and journalist Carsten Clante. Filming began in March 1976 - with a cast of 192 non-professional actors.

== Reception ==
The film was released in cinemas in Denmark on February 21, and in Sweden on April 25, and screened at the Cannes Film Festival, Edinburgh International Film Festival and Moscow International Film Festival where it was nominated for the Golden Price.

According to Watkins, the reception in Scandinavia was very hostile, and primarily attacked for “lacking a political base.” Scholar Joseph Gomez later wrote “Those familiar with Watkins’ Scandinavian films might at first perceive Evening Land as a step backward in his cinematic development. (...) It might be more appropriate, however, to consider the film as a step to the side - a parallel development of his style”. Although critical of Watkin’s romanticization of the kidnappers, he believes that Evening Land remains «practically the only serious political film about life in Western society in the late 1970s». The film was acknowledged by French critics, who recognized it as a major political work which "can develop analysis and true thinking" in the viewer. Most French critics also praised the film's technical accomplishments and its dialectic structure.

Despite the positive French reception, the film was not aired on Danish television as it did not, "reach a standard which DR finds necessary”. Because of this response, and the negative overall attitudes of television and film executives in Scandinavia, Watkins was to began another period of self-exile.
