= Edvard Munch (film) =

1974 Norwegian biographical psychological docudrama by Peter Watkins

- DVD cover
- Directed by: Peter Watkins
- Written by: Peter Watkins
- Produced by: NRK and SVT/Sveriges Radio
- Starring: Geir Westby; Gro Fraas
- Narrated by: Peter Watkins (Eng); Svein Sturla Hugnes (Nor)
- Cinematography: Odd Geir Saether
- Edited by: Peter Watkins
- Release date: 12 November 1974
- Running time: 211 minutes (television) 174 minutes (cinema)
- Countries: Norway; Sweden
- Languages: Norwegian; Swedish; English; German; Danish

Edvard Munch (Norwegian pronunciation: [ˈɛ̀dvɑɖ ˈmʊŋk]) is a 1974 Norwegian biographical psychological docudrama film written, narrated and directed by English filmmaker Peter Watkins. It is about the Norwegian Expressionist painter Edvard Munch. It stars non-professional Norwegian actor Geir Westby (in his debut and only acting role) as the painter. Watkins appears as an English-speaking voiceover narrator to imbue the film its documentary style. It was originally created as a two-part miniseries co-produced by the Norwegian and Swedish state television networks NRK and SVT, but subsequently gained an American theatrical release in 1976. The film covers about thirty years of Munch's life, focusing on the influences that shaped his art, particularly the prevalence of disease and death in his family and his youthful affair with a married woman.

It received widespread critical acclaim (with universal praise towards Westby's portrayal of the painter), and is widely regarded as one of the best biographical movies ever made, as well as one of the greatest Norwegian movies of all time. Geir Westby's work is widely considered by many critics, scholars and cinephiles as one of the finest male acting performances in movie history.

== Synopsis ==
The story begins in 1884 with an introduction to the class-system in the Norwegian capital of Kristiania (the old name of Norway's capital, Oslo). It also shows the conditions of the Munch household, which is often visited upon by illness, insanity and death. Munch's father Christian is a pious doctor, who does not approve of his son's friendship with the Kristiania Boheme. This group of intellectuals consist of anarchist author Hans Jaeger, naturalistic painter Christian Krogh and feminists like Andrea Fredrikke Emilie. Munch has been painting for the last five years and has made about a dozen canvases, mostly views of his country near his home, and portraits of his family. Inspired by Jaeger he begins to express himself more personally. His first completed painting, the portrait of his sister "Inger in Black", is heavily criticized by the Kristiania conservative press. The assault on his work is to continue for the next 15 years.

In May 1885 Munch visits Paris, where he is first exposed to classical art. After returning, he begins a relationship with a married women he refers to as "Mrs. Heiberg". Their relationship is heavily plagued with jealousy on Munch's part. This affects his work as he paints "The Sick Child" which depicts his sister Sophie who died from tuberculosis. He also begins putting several layers of texture on his paintings, and cuts deep into the canvas. The painting and his other works are heavily attacked by the Kristiania public and conservative press. Because of this, Munch begins a two-year withdrawal.

In 1888 the Kristiania Boheme has begun to disintegrate, and Munch rents a cottage at Asgardstrand. He still pursues Mrs. Heiberg, while trying to distance himself from her. He cultivates a relationship with the young painter Aase Carlson, who rejects his advances. A feeling of tension and loneliness enters Munch's paintings, and the loose brushstrokes disappear. In April his work is attacked again by the critics in Kristiania, and he leaves for Paris to study art.

In November 1889 Munch's father Christian dies, and so the painter begins to re-assess the values and beliefs of Hans Jaeger. In Paris, Naturalism in art is being replaced by Symbolism, and Munch begins to articulate his artistic philosophy. It is to understand and express the purpose of people's existence. His painting "Night in St. Cloud" is another breakthrough, but is heavily attacked when exhibited at the State Autumn Exhibition in Kristiania in September 1890.

In 1891 Munch makes another breakthrough when painting two lovers whose faces blend into one another. He now uses all forms of media to his disposal to strip away needless details and perspective. Other breakthroughs, including "Inger in Black and Violet" and "Despair", are heavily attacked by the Norwegian press. An exhibition in Berlin is also heavily criticized and is shut down. While living in Imperial Germany, Munch befriends authors like August Strindberg, Sigbjorn Obsfelder and Stanislaw Przybyszewski, and takes the musical-student Dagny Juel as his mistress. He also begins to suffer from agoraphobia.

In 1893 Munch paints "Madonna", using Juel as his model. He continues with the artistic themes of love, pain, despair and death, and creates several depictions of the death of his sister to deal with the grief and isolation of his family and himself. He also creates "Love and Pain", which Przybyszewski retitles "Vampire". In February his 15th exhibition is attacked by critics in Copenhagen. Munch's health and mind is deteriorating as he creates his most famous work "The Scream" which is criticized at his 24th exhibition in Berlin.

In 1894 Munch paints "Anxiety", "Puberty", and newer versions of older paintings. He begins using copper engraving and later moves on to etching and acquaint. In July he gets his first serious recognition by art-critic Julius Meier-Graefe, Stanislaw Przybyszewski and two other German critics.

In October 1895 Munch's work is yet again attacked at an exhibition at Bloomqvist Gallery in Kristiania. A boycott is called for, and police are summoned. Many of Munch's contemporaries rally behind him, realizing that his art is probing into a new understanding of the human psyche. He also begins mastering woodcut, using the technique to recolor his previous works.

The narrator gives an epilogue of what is to happen to Munch and many of the people in his life. The movie ends with a Munch quote: "I felt as if there were invisible threads between us. I felt as if invisible threads from her hair still twisted themselves around me. And when she completely disappeared there, over the ocean, then I felt still how it hurt, where my heart bled, because the threads could not be broken".

== Production ==
In 1968 Watkins had made a visit to the Edvard Munch Museum in Oslo where he was deeply moved by the artist's work. He was also later moved by "Death and the Child", which in its time, was attacked as being "incomplete" - a criticism given to many of Munch's works. According to Watkins it took three years to persuade NRK to fund the film, which only happened after SVT convinced them to participate in a co-production.

Oslo served as the main shooting location, with other shots being done at Asgardstrand and the Musée Rodin in Paris. The exhibition scenes were done at the Munch Museum and The National Gallery in Oslo, and original Munch paintings and prints were used during production. Watkins was to use an amateur cast of 360 people, several of them giving their honest opinions of the paintings in the film. Many in the film crew came from NRK, forming, according to Watkins, one of the very best working groups he has had.

== Distribution ==
The film was first broadcast in two parts on NRK on November 12 and 13 in 1974, but the theatrical version was not released in Norwegian cinemas until November 2, 2007. Watkins claims that a group of NRK producers denounced its use of amateur actors and anachronistic dialogue, and along with SVT tried to prevent the film from representing Norway at the Cannes Film Festival. He also claims that NRK subsequently destroyed all of the original quarter-inch sound recordings, including the final sound mix, and neglected the film after it was widely screened on European TV, and several cinemas in America. Photographer Odd Geir Saether notes that although there are truths to Watkins' claims, which can be attributed to the co-operation between NRK and SVT, he does not believe that Tore Breda Thoresen (head of Television Theatre at NRK) would have treated the film this way. He also links Watkins' claims to the fact that the original negative of the film was lost in the late 1970s while being converted from 16mm to 35mm, though it is uncertain how this happened. The film has since been made available on DVD and Blu-ray, and NRK released their original aired version on their digital platform on September 24, 2014.

== Reception ==
On review aggregator Rotten Tomatoes, 100% of 12 reviews are positive. According to Watkins, most reviews of the film tended to be positive after being shown on television and at cinemas in many countries, including Britain, during the mid-70s, although some critics found the film to be repetitive and exaggerated. The Swedish director Ingmar Bergman called the film a "work of genius". The film was screened at the 1976 Cannes Film Festival, but was not entered into the main competition. It won "Best Foreign Programme" at the 1977 BAFTA TV Award and "Best Art Film" at Asolo Art Film Festival.

== Cast ==
- Geir Westby as Edvard Munch
- Gro Fraas as Mrs Heiberg
- Johan Halsbog as Dr. Christian Munch
- Lotte Teig as Laura Cathrine Bjolstad
- Gro Jarto as Laura Cathrine Munch
- Rachel Pedersen as Inger Marie Munch
- Berit Rytter Hasle as Laura Munch
- Gunnar Skjetne as Peter Andreas Munch
- Kare Stormark as Hans Jaeger
- Eli Ryg as Oda Lasson
- Iselin Bast as Dagny Juel
- Alf Kare Strindberg as August Strindberg
- Eric Allum as Edvard - 1868
- Amund Berge as Edvard - 1875
- Kerstii Allum as Sophie - 1868
- Inger-Berit Oland as Sophie - 1875
- Susan Troldmyr as Laura - 1868
- Camilla Falk as Laura - 1875
- Ragnvald Caspari as Peter - 1868
- Erik Kristiansen as Peter - 1875
- Katja Pedersen as Inger - 1868
- Anne-Marie Daehli as Inger - 1875
