= Resan =

1987 documentary film by Peter Watkins

Resan (The Journey)
- Directed by: Peter Watkins
- Written by: Peter Watkins
- Produced by: Peter Watkins
- Starring: Francine Bastien; Brian Mulroney; Mila Mulroney
- Edited by: Manfred Becker; Petra Valier; Peter Watkins; Peter Wintonick
- Release date: 1987
- Running time: 873 minutes

Resan (Swedish for The Journey) is a 1987 documentary film by Peter Watkins, made between the years 1983 and 1986 on several continents, and structured around the theme of nuclear weapons, military spending and poverty. Ordinary people are asked about their awareness of these issues.

With a running time of 873 minutes, Resan is the longest non-experimental film ever made. It was screened at the 1987 Festival of Festivals as well as the "International Forum for New Cinema" of the Berlin Film Festival in 1987, but has rarely been seen since. In February 2007, it was screened at the Mexico City International Festival of Contemporary Cinema (FICCO) as part of a retrospective on Peter Watkins. Between April 25 and May 1, 2007, all nineteen parts of the film were screened at the Austrian Filmmuseum in Vienna, Austria as part of a retrospective on Peter Watkins.

== Premise ==
From 1983 to 1986, Peter Watkins filmed Resan in 12 countries. This 14-hour-and-30-minute documentary, structured in 90-minute modules, is a pacifist plea against nuclear arms. It consists of interviews with families from five continents discussing nuclear weapons, the challenges of accessing reliable information through the media and educational systems, their respective governments' policies on nuclear arms, the consequences and use of these weapons, and the role of mass media in driving the arms race.

As in his earlier work The War Game, Watkins sometimes stages episodes of atomic warfare, emphasizing the lack of protection provided to civilian populations by their governments. The film alternates between real (interviews) and fictionalized (recreations of nuclear attacks) documentary elements, simultaneously reflecting on its own process: a voiceover and title cards regularly prompt viewers to consider the image they’ve just seen, its duration, and how it was edited, creating a film that analyzes itself as it unfolds. Every television network Watkins approached ultimately refused to broadcast it.

== See also ==
- List of longest films
