= Pseudo-documentary =

Documentary genre that features fictional events

A pseudo-documentary or fake documentary is a film or video production that takes the form or style of a documentary film but does not portray real events. Rather, scripted and fictional elements are used to tell the story. The pseudo-documentary, unlike the related mockumentary, is not always intended as satire or humor. It may use documentary camera techniques but with fabricated sets, actors, or situations, and it may use digital effects to alter the filmed scene or even create a wholly synthetic scene.

== Film ==
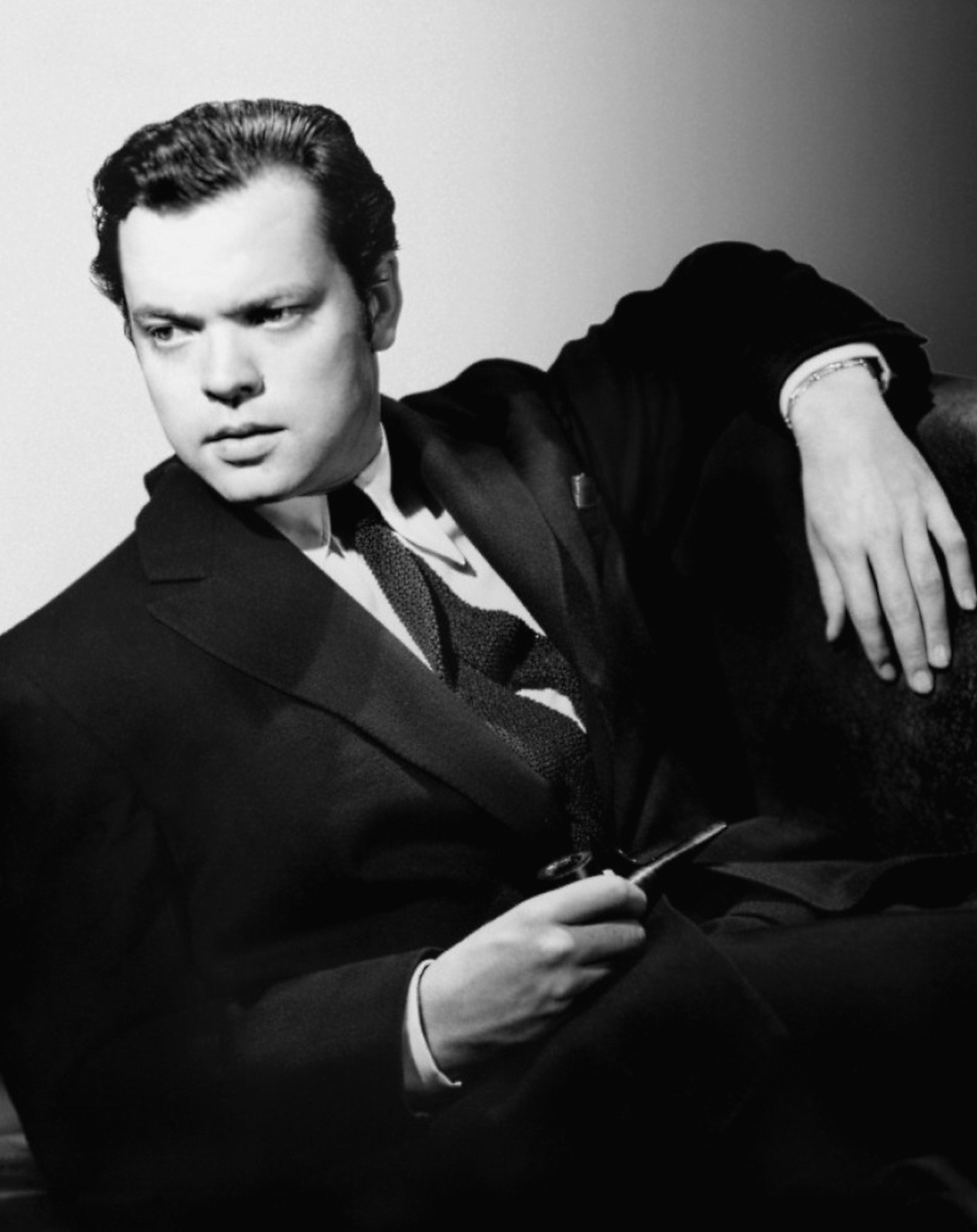
Orson Welles made use of pseudo-documentary elements in his work.

Orson Welles gained notoriety with his radio show and hoax War of the Worlds which fooled listeners into thinking the Earth was being invaded by Martians. Film critic Jonathan Rosenbaum says this is Welles' first pseudo-documentary. Pseudo-documentary elements were subsequently used in his feature films. For instance, Welles created a pseudo-documentary newsreel which appeared within his 1941 film Citizen Kane, and he began his 1955 film, Mr. Arkadin, with a pseudo-documentary prologue.

Peter Watkins made several films in the pseudo-documentary style. The War Game (1965), which reported on a fake nuclear bombing of England, was seen as so disturbingly realistic that the BBC chose not to broadcast it. The film won the Academy Award for Best Documentary Feature. Watkins' other such films include Punishment Park (1971) and La Commune (2002).

The film Mad Max 2 first frames the story by showing a staged documentary-style sequence of images designed to inform the viewer that what follows is the aftermath of an apocalyptic global war.

=== Fake-fiction ===
Related to, and in exact opposition to pseudo-documentary, is the notion of “fake-fiction”. A fake-fiction film takes the form of a staged, fictional movie, while actually portraying real, unscripted events.

The notion of fake-fiction was coined by Pierre Bismuth to describe his 2016 film Where Is Rocky II?, which uses documentary methods to tell a real, unscripted story, but is shot and edited to appear like a fiction film. The effect of this fictional aesthetic is precisely to cancel the sense of reality, making the real events appear as if they were staged or constructed.

Unlike the related mockumentary, fake-fiction does not focus on satire, and in distinction with docufiction, it does not re-stage fictional versions of real past events.

Another filmmaker whose work could be associated with the concept of fake-fiction is Gianfranco Rosi. For example, Below Sea Level uses the language of fiction cinema in its rendering of unscripted, documentary material. Of his own work, Rosi said, "I don’t care if I'm making a fiction film or documentary — to me it's a film, it's a narrative thing."

=== Found or discovered footage ===
The term found footage has sometimes been used to describe pseudo-documentaries where the plot involves the discovery of the film's footage. Found footage is originally the name of an entirely different genre, but the magazine Variety, for example, used the term "faux found-footage film" to describe the 2012 film Grave Encounters 2. The film scholar David Bordwell has criticized this recent use because of the confusion it creates, and instead prefers the term "discovered footage" for the narrative gimmick.

== Television ==
Pseudo-documentary forms have appeared in television advertisements and campaign advertising. The "Revolving Door" ad used in the US presidential campaign of 1988 to attack candidate Michael Dukakis showed scripted scenes intended to look like documentary footage of men entering and exiting a prison through a revolving door. Boston-based band the Del Fuegos appeared in a 1984 commercial for Miller beer, with scripted scenes shot in hand-held camera/pseudo-documentary style. The band was criticized for selling out and for the falseness of the commercial; founding member Warren Zanes said making the ad was a mistake, that their core audience turned away, and the larger audience gained by the exposure did not maintain interest for long.

Peter Greenaway employed pseudo-documentary style in his French television production Death on the Seine in 1988. He used fabricated scenes to reconstruct a historic event that was otherwise impossible to shoot, and portrayed it as reality.

Reality television has been described as a form of pseudo-documentary. An early and influential example is 1992's The Real World by MTV, a scripted "reality" show bordering on soap opera.

== Literature ==
Many books—such as The Shape of Things to Come, For Want of a Nail, and The Glory of the Empire—have been written in a style similar to pseudo-documentaries, taking the form of a textbook but depicting fictional events.

== See also ==
- Docudrama – a dramatized documentary
- Docufiction – a documentary of fiction
- Mockumentary – a parodical or humorous fictional documentary
- Mondo film – a type of exploitative documentary film
