= Punishment Park =

- Official promotional cover
- Directed by: Peter Watkins
- Written by: Peter Watkins
- Screenplay by: Peter Watkins
- Produced by: Susan Martin
- Starring: Carmen Argenziano; Harold Beaulieu; Jim Bohan; Stan Armsted; Paul Alelyanes; Luke Johnson; Katherine Quittner; Scott Turner; Mary Ellen Kleinhall; Mark Keats; Gladys Golden; Sanford Golden; George Gregory; Norman Sinclair; Sigmund Rich; Paul Rosenstein
- Cinematography: Joan Churchill; Peter Smokler
- Music by: Paul Motian
- Production companies: Chartwell; Francoise
- Distributed by: Project X Distribution
- Release date: January 1, 1971
- Running time: 89 minutes
- Country: United States
- Language: English
- Budget: $95,000

Punishment Park is a 1971 American pseudo-documentary drama film written and directed by Peter Watkins. The film follows a British and West German film crew documenting National Guard soldiers and police as they pursue members of a counterculture group across a desert for draft evasion.

== Plot ==
In the near future, the Vietnam War is escalating, South Korea's capital of Seoul is under bombardment, and the Soviet Union is deploying their U-boats off the coast of Cuba. As a "preventive measure" against possible attacks and sabotages, President Richard Nixon enacts the groundwork for the McCarran Internal Security Act, a series of emergency laws, which include the detainment of individuals suspected of being civil rights, anti-war, or women's rights activists. People in these groups are rounded up and presented to tribunals, who are authorized to enforce harsh sentences. Instead of serving prison sentences, the convicted are given the option to participate in a race in a "punishment park": the participants, encouraged by only the promise of water, must complete the task of traveling 50 miles (~80 kilometers) in the desert in order to reach an American flag while being hunted by police and the National Guard, all within three days. For those who achieve the goal within the given timeframe, they will be considered amnesty.

Two camera crews from Great Britain and West Germany receive permission to film a punishment park, located in southern California. While one group of the protestors, Group 638, is facing examination from the tribunal, Group 637 is already on their way. During the course of filming (with the leader of the British team commentating), the viewer learns that the underlying purpose of the punishment park is to train the security forces in dealing with violent protestors. After discovering that the promised supply of drinking water never existed, violent clashes and lynchings break out between Group 637 and their pursuers, resulting in many members of Group 637 dying. When the surviving members of the group reach the American flag, they are met by police officers who reveal that the considered amnesty was also nonexistent. In a fit of rage, one of the survivors attacks the officers, resulting in the remaining officers beating him and the others while the camera crew continues filming. Simultaneously, Group 638 is confronted with brutal prison terms. Faced with this outcome, they also choose to endure the punishment park.

== Production ==
In 1969, British filmmaker Peter Watkins traveled to the United States to produce a trilogy of movies for a subsidiary of Columbia Pictures. The films were intended to cover the American Revolutionary War, the American Civil War, and the wars against Native Americans during the colonization of the United States. When plans for the project collapsed, Watkins planned to leave the United States; however, in the face of the 1970 Kent State Massacre, he felt inspired to stay. Backed by Susan Martin, the producer of the unfinished trilogy, Watkins initially planned to produce a documentary about the anti-Vietnam war protestors known as the Chicago Seven. However, following encounters with groups of young activists during casting, as well as his discovery of the McCarran Internal Security Act, Watkins concocted the idea for Punishment Park.

The film is an example of a uchronia, or alternate history, and of a psychodrama. It was shot in the observational documentary style using hand-held cameras. Watkins heightened realism by using amateur actors, improvisation, and newsreel camera techniques, but he also had rigid control over editing to guarantee audience involvement and the clear expression of his personal vision.

Even though there was a detailed script for Punishment Park, Peter Watkins allowed the actors to improvise to an even greater extent than his previous films, in order to capture as spontaneous and authentic impression possible of their freely expressed viewpoints. He also did away with rehearsals, although some members of the tribunals worked with a prepared script.

The harsh conditions of the Mojave desert intensified the rising tensions among the teams, ultimately leading to an unforeseen accident: While shooting a scene in which members of Group 637 are being fired at by their pursuers, the actors pelted the guards with stones. In response, the actors portraying the guards opened fire without warning, causing two of the actors playing group members to fall to the ground. Watkins, convinced they had been accidentally shot, shouted “Cut! Cut!” in shock before realizing what had actually happened. The scene, including Watkins’ reaction, was ultimately kept in the film.

Shortly after filming, Stan Armsted was charged and convicted with assaulting a police officer as well as participating in a bombing, which Watkins' brought attention in the film's credits.

=== Technical notes ===
The set was extremely minimal, using only a tent enclosed within a larger tent for the interior scenes. It took only two and a half weeks to shoot. The "newsreel" quality of the film was enhanced by desaturating the color and removing the traditional hard edge of the image through the use of Harrison diffusion filters.

Cinematographer Joan Churchill joined the team on the recommendation from the dean of the University of California. Filming was carried out with an Éclair NPR 16-mm-Kamera. (Note: Due to its portability and relatively low weight, the Éclair NPR — like the Arriflex by Arnold & Richter — was among the preferred camera models used in documentaries and independent films. See also: "Éclair NPR". Internet Encyclopedia of Cinematographers. Archived from the original on October 10, 2012.) For special equipment, such as a custom-made shoulder mount, Watkins consulted veteran cinematographer Haskell Wexler. Punishment Park was filmed over the course of August and September 1970 at El Mirage Lake in the Mojave Desert, California. Afterwards, Watkins and co-editor Terry Hodel assembled 58,000 feet (around 27 hours) of footage. For the soundtrack, Watkins enlisted the popular jazz musician Paul Motian, whose recordings he partly altered. The budget was $95,000, including a blow-up from 16-mm to 35-mm film.

=== References in film ===
==== McCarran Internal Security Act ====
The McCarran Internal Security Act, also known as the Internal Security Act or the Emergency Detention Act, was a law enacted in 1950 by Democratic senator Pat McCarran, overriding a veto by President Harry S. Truman. Intended to combat the rise of communism in the United States, the act authorized measures such as the arrest and detention of individuals that there was "...reasonable ground to believe that this person will engage in, or has engaged in, acts of espionage and sabotage, whether alone or in concert with others." Truman justified his veto, warning that the act posed a "...danger to freedom of speech, press, and assembly." Following the enactment of this law, Congress authorized the creation of six detention camps within the United States, though they were not used. Over time, parts of the act were repealed, most notably in September 1971 with the passage of the Non-Detention Act.

==== Hitler quotes ====
Towards the end of the film, the public defender of one of the defendants reads a quotation regarding the importance of upholding the nation's security interests. After reading it, he adds that the quote, contrary to what one might believe, did not come from the President of the United States, but supposedly Adolf Hitler. However, authors Paul F. Boller Jr. and John George argue otherwise, as they claim the quote was widely used at political events through the 1960s and even featured in the film Billy Jack. (Note: The quote as used in the film reads: "The streets of our country are in turmoil. The universities are filled with students rebelling and rioting. Communists are seeking to destroy our country. Russia is threatening us with her might and the republic is in danger. Yes, danger from within and without. We need law and order or our nation cannot survive.")

=== Film release ===
Punishment Park screened in 1971 as part of the Cannes International Film Festival (though it was not entered in the competition), as well as the Atlanta Film Festival, the San Francisco International Film Festival, and the New York Film Festival. The film was shown briefly at the Murray Hill Cinema in New York and in San Francisco, however, it never had a traditional film screening or TV broadcast in the United States. Great Britain's first screening of Punishment Park was in London in February 1972 and was distributed on 16mm prints. In October 1971, the film was shown at the Mannheim-Heidelberg International Film Festival. In 1980, an original, subtitled version of the film was shown in Germany.

== Analysis ==
=== Controversy ===
According to Watkins', audiences in the United States had an often "hostile" and harsh reception to the film; one example being during a showing at a college, where he was loudly jeered and criticized for his "pessimistic" view of the future. Watkins described the film's punishment parks as a metaphor for the political and social landscape in the United States, while also pointing out parallels to police brutality and aggressive foreign influence in Southeast Asia. Watkins considered the American media and education systems' "complete denial" of these issues deeply troubling; however, he did not consider Punishment Park to be anti-American. "The problem of the...suppression is not limited to the USA of the 1970s...but remains a pressing issue even today, everywhere in the world." During the film's press kit, Watkins praised the film's timelessness: "Punishment Park takes place tomorrow, yesterday, or five years in the future."

Another frequent criticism, according to Watkins' biographer Joseph A. Gomez, is the one-dimensionality of the characters. However, this, at least in part, can be attributed to the extreme circumstances in which the characters found themselves (specifically an interrogation or a manhunt). "One cannot expect too much depth when individuals are shouting at each other and throwing cliched political rhetoric at each other." Gomez also noted that the characters represented "a wide variety of intellectual positions." Addressing the accusations of partisanship and polemics, he remarked: "No characters or political viewpoints are glamorized here, no alternatives are proposed, and no superficial solutions are offered." He argued that this was prohibited by the diverse composition of the accused themselves: a group made up of militants, semi-militants (according to Watkins), and pacifists.

The lack of identifiable sympathetic characters along with the constant injustice portrayed in the film, also gave Scott MacDonald, writer for the journal Film Critic, an explanation for why it failed to connect with audiences, in contrast to other successful political films such as All the President's Men (1976) and Mr. Smith Goes to Washington (1939).

=== Thematics ===
Even in Watkins' 1968 film, Gladiatorerna, a race between life and death lies at the center of the plot. In this film, rather than waging war against each other, representatives of each major power dispatch a handful of soldiers into a designated area, where they must compete in a deadly, filmed race towards a predetermined objective. The "peace game" on display is a media spectacle that draws record-breaking ratings. The conflicting role of the media is revisited in Punishment Park: following a brutal police assault on the remaining members of Group 638, a verbal altercation breaks out between the head of the British film crew and the police officers. The officers respond to the accusations saying that the film crew offered no assistance to the injured and were only there for financial gain. "Watkins takes a clear stand against oppression, against brutalization, [and] against the lack of compassion in our society," said Gomez.

With Punishment Park, Watkins began to abandon the traditional narrative forms of audiovisual media, which he would later coin "monoform." (Note: Watkins defined "monoform" as all conventional film techniques that — through rapid editing, emotional use of music, and other structuring and controlling devices — prevent the viewer from reflecting on their own (media-manipulated) reactions and from engaging interactively with the medium. See: Peter Watkins, The Creative and Political Meaning of Punishment Park: A Self-Interrogatory Dialogue, 2005, printed in the booklet accompanying the 2012 British Blu-ray Disc release. See also: "Role of American MAVM, Hollywood and the Monoform". Peter Watkins Official Website. Archived from the original on August 6, 2012.) In this film, Watkins argued that a fusion of realism and expressionism comes into play: while on one hand, it still employs familiar cinematic structures, it simultaneously fractures them through its specific use of music and dialogue. Another layer of ambiguity can be seen in the framing of a fictional event as a documentary. This approach, however, was met with opposition, specifically from Margaret Hinxman of The Sunday Telegraph: No circumstance, no matter how truthful could excuse the possibility of "...depicting something in the guise of fact which is not one hundred percent fact." In his biography of Watkins, Gomez posed a rhetorical counterargument: "Does a documentary truly constitute an objective presentation of fact, or does the mere presence of a camera inevitably alter the event?" Watkins himself expressed his stance unequivocally: "Every audiovisual act is an act of fiction."

As a further aspect of ambiguity, one that dissolves the rigid structures of the medium, Watkins noted the transformation of the film crew from neutral, "godlike" (Watkins) observers into protagonists who, in the finale, intervene in the film's climax. As stated by George W. Brandt from British Television Drama, "This breakdown of detached observation...lends a truly provocative dimension to the film's underlying ethical conflict...in retrospect, all of the film's images acquire a problematic status, rather than one that remains unquestioned (due to the author's stance of detachment)."

=== Parallel Discourse and Aftermath ===
Since the early 2000s, in light of facilities such as the detention camps at Guantánamo Bay, articles have repeatedly brought attention to the renewed relevance of Punishment Park. Despite this, film historians haven't identified any lasting influence of the film on the medium itself. (Note: While Punishment Park was occasionally referenced in reviews of films sharing its theme of a manhunt involving prisoners — such as No Escape and others — those films abandoned any sociopolitical analysis in favour of action elements. See: Newman, Kim (2011). Nightmare Movies: Horror on Screen Since the 1960s. Bloomsbury. p. 108. ISBN 978-1-4088-0503-9.; Hardy, Phil (1995). The Aurum Film Encyclopedia: Science Fiction (3rd ed.). London: Aurum Press. pp. 379, 490. ISBN 978-1-85410-382-6.. Punishment Park was also occasionally cited in discussions of docudramas such as Novemberverbrechen (1968) and Death of a President (2006). See: Arnold, Klaus; Hömberg, Walter; Kinnebrock, Susanne (2010). Geschichtsjournalismus: Zwischen Information und Inszenierung (in German). Berlin: Lit Verlag. p. 303. ISBN 978-3-643-10420-5.; Ebert, Roger (September 12, 2006). "Death of a President review". Chicago Sun-Times.) Instead, it has frequently been referenced, along with Wexler's Medium Cool and Robert Kramer's Ice, as an obscure key work of politically radical cinema from the late 1960s and early 1970s. Medium Cool contextualizes its narrative with the civil unrest surrounding the 1968 Democratic National Convention in Chicago, while Ice follows a group of revolutionaries in a totalitarian, near-future America. Similar to Punishment Park, both films employ the style of mockumentaries.

In A Critical Cinema: Interviews with Independent Filmmakers, Scott MacDonald placed Punishment Park, alongside Jim McBride's David Holzman's Diary (1967), with a lineage of 1960s films that subjected the cinéma vérité school of documentary filmmaking to negative critical reception. Gary Giddins also firmly placed Punishment Park within its historical context; alongside films such as Vilgot Sjöman and Michelangelo Antonioni's Zabriskie Point, he described it as a reflection of its era that was “more honest” than films such as Alice’s Restaurant (1969) or Easy Rider (1969): works he accused of sentimentalization and romanticization.

Thanks to her work on Punishment Park, camerawoman Joan Churchill received subsequent offers for concert films and documentaries such as Soldier Girls (1981); producer Susan Martin later went onto work on the controversial Vietnam documentary Hearts and Minds (1974). Punishment Park was Watkins' last film in the US; his next film, Edvard Munch (1974) was produced in Norway.

== Reception ==
One of Watkins' intentions for the film was to provoke strong emotional and intellectual responses. Few people had impartial reactions to the film. As Watkins foresaw, this produced debates after the viewings of the film similar to the debates that take place in the film. There were many extremely negative reactions to the film, largely due to the unconventional form or because it was viewed as an indictment against the United States. Some even linked the film to communism, claiming that the film expresses a Communist philosophy. However, many more people were critical that a British director would make a film about American political problems in a time of crisis. The film was heavily attacked when it was released at the 1971 New York Film Festival and Hollywood studios refused to distribute it.

The film proved to be especially polarizing within the United States. Vincent Canby of The New York Times sharply attacked the film: "A film of such unvarnished, misguided self-assurance that one sits through the hysterical first ten minutes only to realize that, fundamentally, one is dealing with a masochist's dream come true." In The New-York Magazine, Judith Crist noted with emphasis that Watkins was permitted "...to declare the U.S. a completely fascist state," and described the film as "offensive," one in which "no one expresses an original or positive thought." Michael Kerbel of The Village Voice took less issue with the content as opposed to the presentation: "It is not [Watkins'] perception of the dangers one might object to, but rather the manner in which he presents them...his films function as hysterical exploitation, not like serious investigations." Despite this, he still had a positive review: "The film expresses exactly what is happening in this country." The San Francisco Chronicle's was positive: "An indictment of devastating impact, a drama that leaves one frozen, and a prediction that makes one shudder. Polemical, without question, but...Watkins has created a deeply disturbing film." The U.S. edition of the Rolling Stone named Punishment Park one of the 10 best films of the year.

In Watkins' home of Great Britain, The Sun polemicized his work: "Propagandist Peter Watkins drifts helpless in his utterly hopeless trains of thought." Other critics, including those from The Sunday Times and The Listener, acknowledged the film's intent and plausibility, but still felt that the message was undermined by its stylistic execution. The Observer also described the film as "hysterical and obsessive," but also "thoughtful," concluding with "Every thinking person should see it." The Scotsman praised it as being "blunt, uncompromising, and brilliant." Even the right-wing tabloid The Daily Mail noted the film retrospectively: "Some years ago, we dismissed the film as the delusion of a sick mind. Today, its documentary undertones are terrifyingly real."

Critics and film historians that specialized in the sci-fi genre also offered mixed assessments of the film. While Alan Frank described it as "boring, shrill, and almost unwatchable" in the Science Fiction and Fantasy Film Handbook, The Aurum Film Encyclopedia praised Punishment Park as, alongside The War Game, "...the most successful of Watkins' examinations of the present by means of reconstructions of the future...a powerful and desperate, albeit occasionally convoluted, indictment of potential oppression."

In Germany, the Catholic journal Stimmen der Zeit (Voice of the Times) stated: "One can dismiss Punishment Park as a malicious dystopia; however, one can also quite seriously label it a nightmare of today's America." The Lexikon des internationalen Films (Lexicon of International Films) viewed it as a "brilliantly staged mock-documentary" and "an attack against fascist tendencies in the USA - a factually exaggerated, yet as a psychological study, highly convincing fable." In 2006, Die Zeit (The Times) observed that the film "fits neatly into prevailing patterns of perception: after all, ever since September 11 the thought is that reality re-enacts cinematic fantasies, and not the other way around. Yet in the case of Punishment Park, the startling visual resemblance smooths over the underlying differences. Above all, the film remains a historical document of the 1968 revolt."

In spite of the controversy at the time of its release, the film has received a positive critical reappraisal in the years since. In 2005, The Guardian wrote that "twenty-five years on, Peter Watkins's dystopian nightmare still grips, imagining hippies and radicals getting tortured for quasi-judicial sport by the National Guard". As of 2023, it holds a 92% "Fresh" rating on Rotten Tomatoes.

=== Awards ===
- Prize for Best Stage Direction at the Atlanta Film Festival, 1971

== DVD/Blu-Ray Release ==
Punishment Park was released on DVD in the United States and France, and released on both DVD and Blu-Ray in Great Britain and Germany.
