= Molly Nesbit =

American art critic and editor

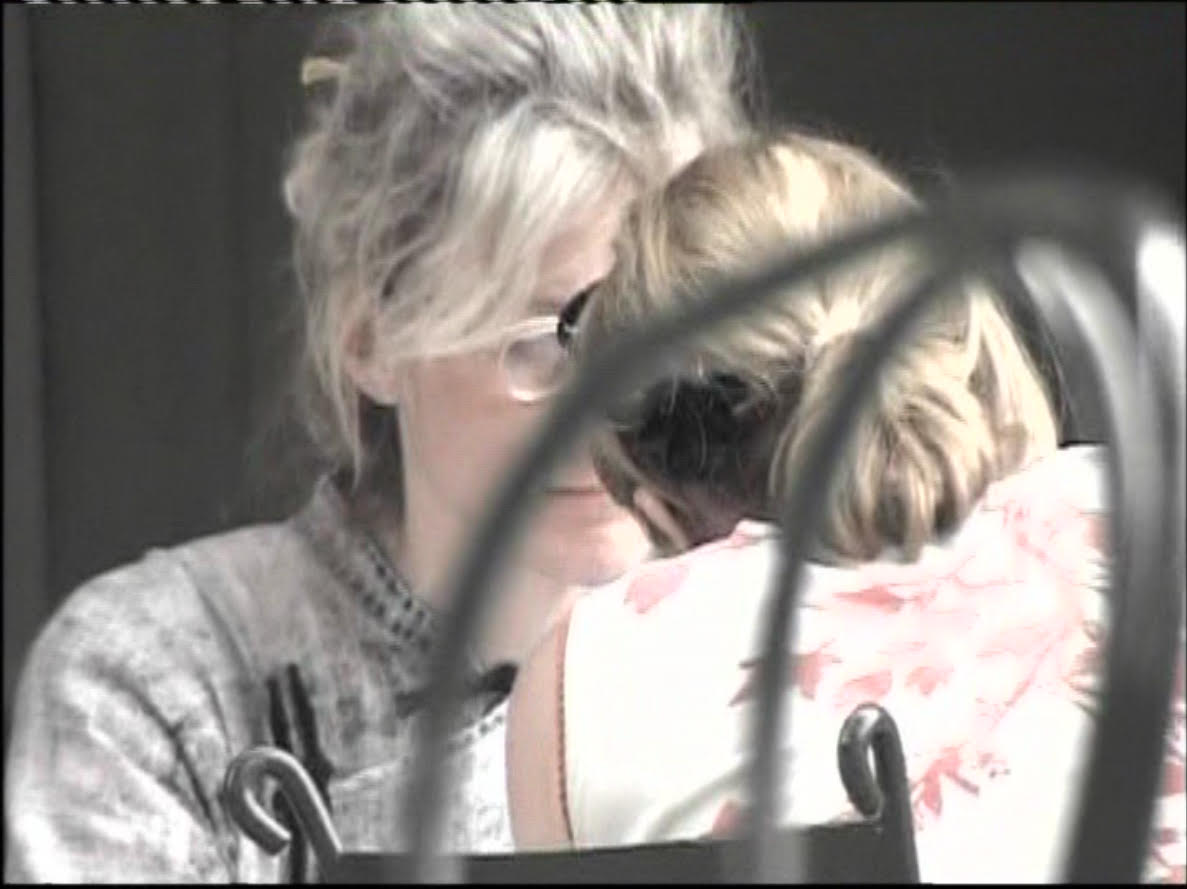
- Born: New York (state)
- Education: Vassar College; Yale University
- Occupation(s): Art historian, professor, curator

Molly Nesbit is a contributing editor at Artforum and a Professor of Art at Vassar College, where she writes and teaches on modern and contemporary art, film, and photography. She graduated from Vassar College in 1974 with a B.A. in Art History, and went on to receive her Ph.D. from Yale University. She taught at the University of California, Berkeley, Barnard College, and Columbia University before returning to Vassar in 1993.

She has received many awards, notably from the Guggenheim Foundation, the J. Paul Getty Trust, and the Creative Capital/Andy Warhol Foundation Arts Writers Grant. In 2019 she received the Distinguished Lifetime Achievement Award for Writing on Art by the College Art Association.

Nesbit's work can be followed through her many articles and books. Atget's Sevent Albums (1992, Yale), Their Common Sense (2000, Black Dog Press), The Pragmatism in the History of Art (Periscope 2013, Inventory Press 2020), which forms the first volume of her collected essays; Midnight: the Tempest Essays (2017, Inventory Press) is the second; a third, Sustainable Aesthetics, is planned.

In 2008 she gave the J. Kirk T. Varnedoe Memorial lectures at the New York University Institute of Fine Arts, to appear in book form as Light in Buffalo.

== Selected Books and Projects ==
=== Utopia Station ===
Since 2002, together with art curator, critic and historian of art Hans-Ulrich Obrist and contemporary artist Rirkrit Tiravanija, she has curated Utopia Station, a collective and ongoing book, exhibition, seminar, website, and street project, located in Poughkeepsie, New York, Frankfurt, Venice, Munich, Porto Alegre, and at the Brooklyn Museum. For information on the early stages of Utopia Station see the e-flux project site: http://projects.e-flux.com/utopia/index.html . The first Utopia Station exhibition took place as part of the Venice Biennale in 2003, and later traveled to the Haus der Kunst in Munich, with additions and modifications, in 2004.

=== The Pragmatism in the History of Art ===
In Pragmatism, the first of Nesbit's Pre-Occupations series of essay compilations, Nesbit outlines the questions modern art historians address to make sense of the changes in art and life during the early 20th century. Through a pragmatic study of the societal changes of this time period, Nesbit attempts to understand the break towards abstraction, best characterized by artists Pablo Picasso and Georges Braque with the rise of Cubism, in which Nesbit interprets the Cubist line as an "embrace of the language of industry." She asserts that it was the introduction of rationalized methods of drawing into the French school curriculum by arts administrators Eugène Guillaume and Antonin Proust in 1881 that led to the break between representational and abstract art.

She explores these inquiries by studying the writings of art historians Meyer Schapiro, Henri Focillon, George Kubler, Robert Herbert, T. J. Clark, and Linda Nochlin, the philosophies of Michel Foucault and Gilles Deleuze, and the films of Chris Marker and Jean-Luc Godard. Artists discussed include Vincent van Gogh, Isamu Noguchi, Lawrence Weiner, and Gordon Matta-Clark, among others.

=== Midnight: The Tempest Essays: Pre-Occupations 2 ===
In Midnight, the second of Nesbit's "Pre-Occupations" series of essay compilations, Nesbit returns the question of pragmatism to the everyday critical practice of the art historian, illustrated with case studies on Eugène Atget, Marcel Duchamp, Jean-Luc Godard, Cindy Sherman, Louise Lawler, Rachel Whiteread, Gabriel Orozco, Rirkrit Tiravanija, Lawrence Weiner, Nancy Spero, Rem Koolhaas, Martha Rosler, Gerhard Richter, Mathew Barney, and Richard Serra, among others, in a continuity of investigation.

The essays were originally published between 1986 and the early 2000s, and reflect Nesbit's interest in "the genealogy of ideas". In an interview with Hyperallergic, Nesbit describes her approach to thinking as being based in the "set of theoretical developments that took place in art history in Europe and the United States in the 1970s and 1980s." Put simply, Nesbit believes that art historians can and should make use of philosophical questions as starting points in the quest to better understand the time and the place of the work of art.

== Publications ==
- Atget's seven albums (Yale University Press 1992)
- Their Common Sense (Black Dog 2000)
- The Pragmatism in the History of Art (Periscope 2013)
- Midnight: The Tempest Essays: Pre-Occupations 2 (Inventory Press 2017)
