= Death and the Child =

1889 painting by Edvard Munch

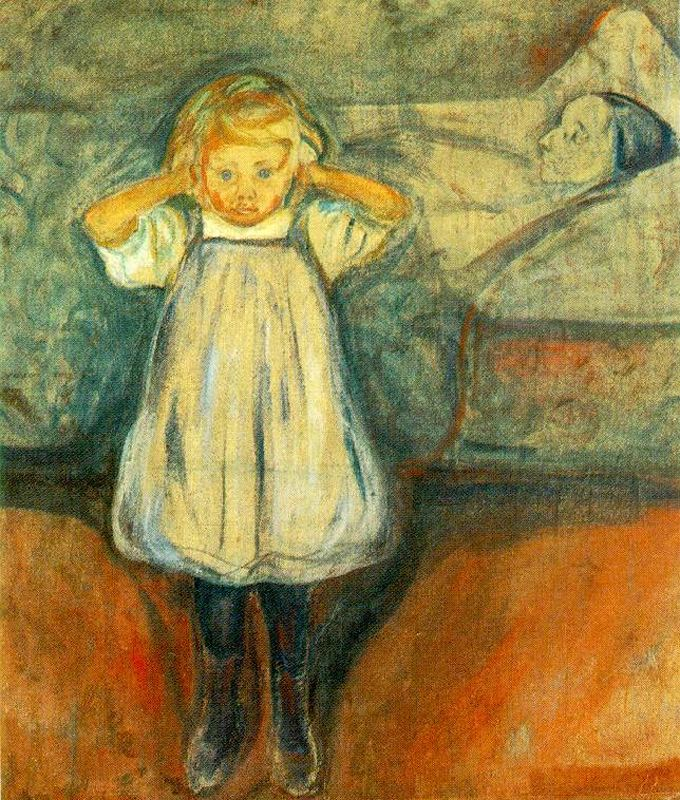
- Artist: Edvard Munch
- Year: 1889
- Medium: Oil on canvas
- Dimensions: 100 cm × 90 cm (39 in × 35 in)
- Location: Kunsthalle Bremen, Bremen

Death and the Child is a composition created by Edvard Munch in 1889. Since 1918 it is located in the Kunsthalle Bremen. It depicts a little girl at her mother’s deathbed who is looking at the viewer in a fearful manner. A second, thus far unknown painting of the artist was discovered underneath the canvas in 2005. A new version of that motif, which refers to Munch’s family and the early death of his mother was created between 1897 and 1899 and is now hanging in the Munch Museum in Oslo. An etching was made in 1901 with this motif.

== Description ==
The picture is a bit higher than it is wide. Shown from above, a small child with blonde hair is depicted in the left half of the painting, who is facing the viewer, standing in front of the bed of a dead or dying woman to whom she has turned her back. Her arms are raised, the hands seem to be pressed against the ears, the head is slightly lowered. Her facial expression is unhappy and the blue eyes are wide open. The child is wearing a white top whose sleeves go up to the elbows or have slipped back, underneath a knee-long, pale purple dress with black stockings and dark boots. The toes almost reach to the lower edge of the painting. The shadow is cast from this point diagonally to the right rear, so that it creates a connection between the child figure that is turned away from the bed and the lying figure in the background. This figure is bedded in a bed or a sofa, whose bottom edge begins at about the height of the lower third of the painting and whose headboard is on the right half of the painting. The head of the dark-haired woman is depicted in profile and rests deeply with closed eyes in a white, puffy pillow. A part of her white covered upper body is also seen, the arms seem to be crossed on the breast. The greenish blanket is moved back until beneath the thorax. Her colour fades almost unnoticeably into the grey-greenish wall behind the bed, while the dull orange of the floor reoccurs in the shadow on both sides of the pillow and creates a resemblance with bloodstains. The dead woman herself seems to be extremely gaunt and worn out and the colour of her skin is barely distinguishable from that of the pillowcase. She is in stark contrast to the healthy skin colour and the tense posture of the child figure, who seems to try to hold off the impressions of death.

The painting allows for associations with traumatic experiences from the childhood and youth of the painter. Munch lost his mother to tuberculosis at the age of five and nine years later one of his sisters, Sophie, who had suffered from the same deadly disease. His sister Laura became depressed.

A commenter stated on the painting that Munch created “devastating figures of expression that directly touch the viewer. The silent horror of the child in face of the dead mother” proves to be “a variant of the famous painting The Scream.”

== History ==
The painting was purchased in 1918 by the Kunsthalle Bremen. The director of the Kunsthalle Emil Waldmann paid DM 20.000 for the painting, which was the first Munch painting to be acquired for a German museum.

Girl and Three Male Heads
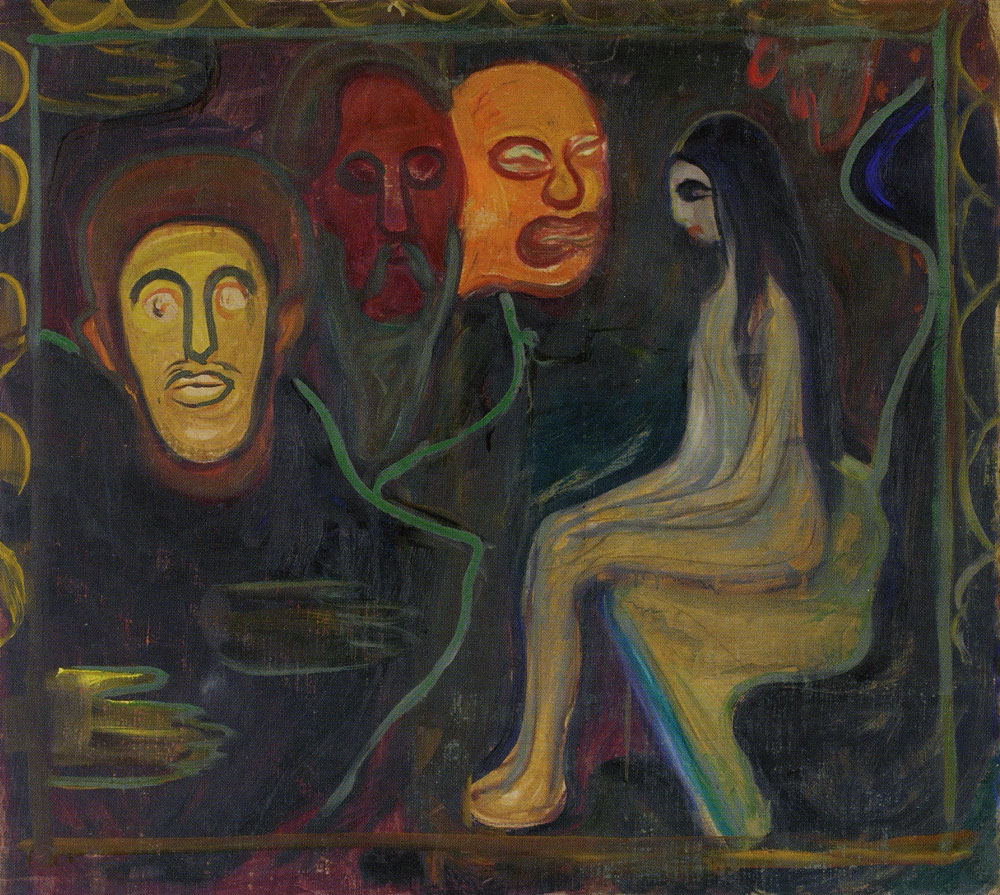
- Artist: Edvard Munch
- Year: 1895
- Completion date: 1898
- Medium: Oil on canvas
- Dimensions: 100 cm × 90 cm (39 in × 35 in)
- Location: Kunsthalle Bremen, Bremen

Upon request of the Munch museum in Oslo, which wanted to list the complete works of Munch and needed exact data, the Bremen Art Society let the painting be examined more closely. X-Ray images then led to the discovery that a second canvas of the same format with another painting of Munch was underneath the painting Death and the Child. This piece of art is unsigned and undated, is from a time around 1895 to 1898 and shows a daintily seated act of a girl next to several big, brightly coloured mask-like heads and gripping hands. It bears the title Girl and Three Male Heads. Death and the Child was wound up on a new stretcher bar after this discovery.

Why the second painting was underneath the canvas is unclear. The piece of art that, according to museum curator Dorothee Hansen was “not a masterpiece”, possibly served as a supporting canvas for Death and the Child and was used this way due to a lack of material or because it did not meet the standards of the artist. Numerous finger prints on the edges of the painting lead to the conclusion that the artwork was often moved back-and-forth when the paint had not dried up, so that it can be assumed that Munch dealt with the composition over a longer timespan.

Both paintings were shown in 2011/2012 in the exhibition Edvard Munch – Rätsel hinter der Leinwand in Bremen.

== Further versions ==
The Dead Mother and the Child
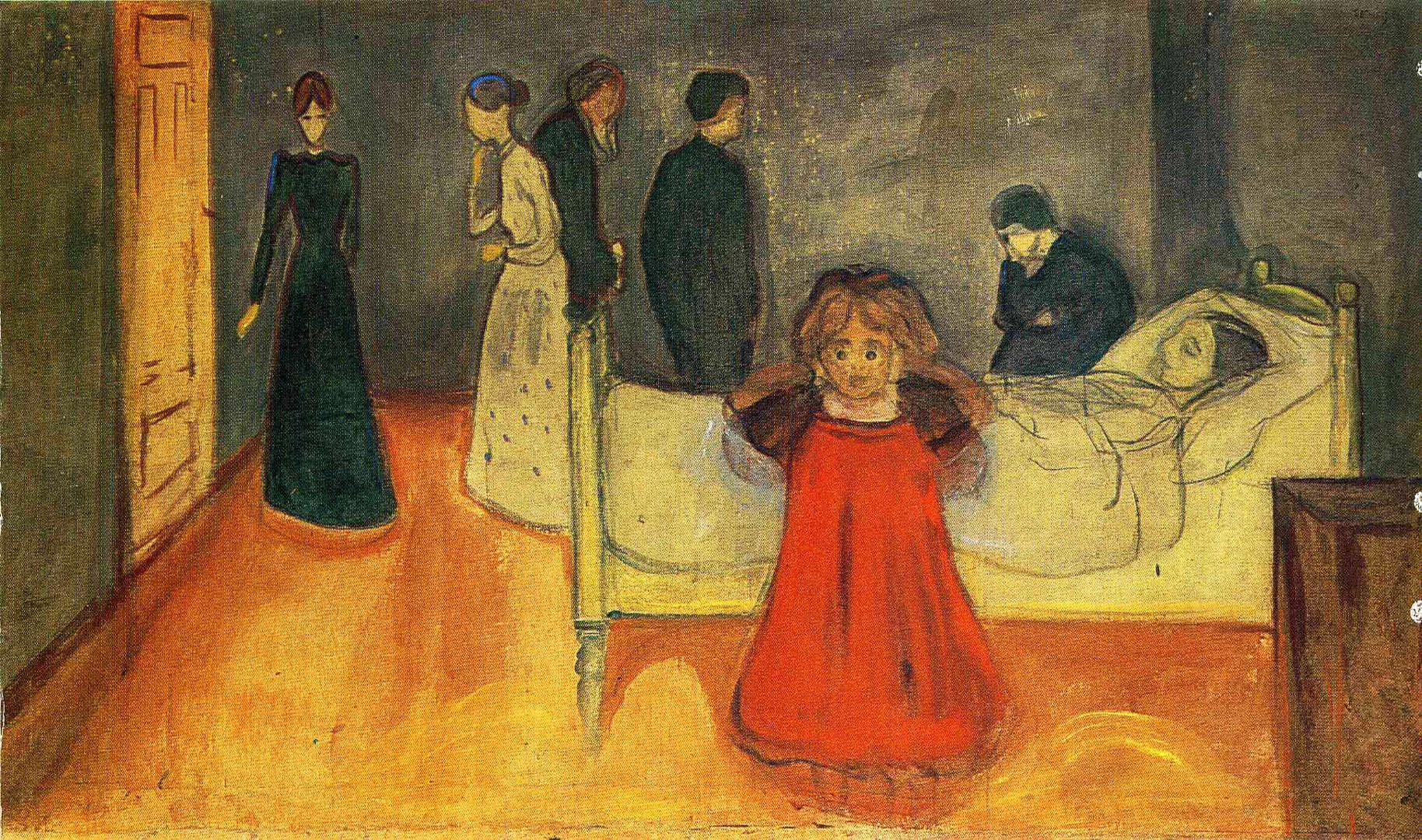
- Artist: Edvard Munch
- Year: 1897
- Completion date: 1899
- Medium: Oil on canvas
- Dimensions: 104 cm × 179.5 cm (41 in × 70.7 in)
- Location: Munch Museum, Oslo

Dead Mother and the Child
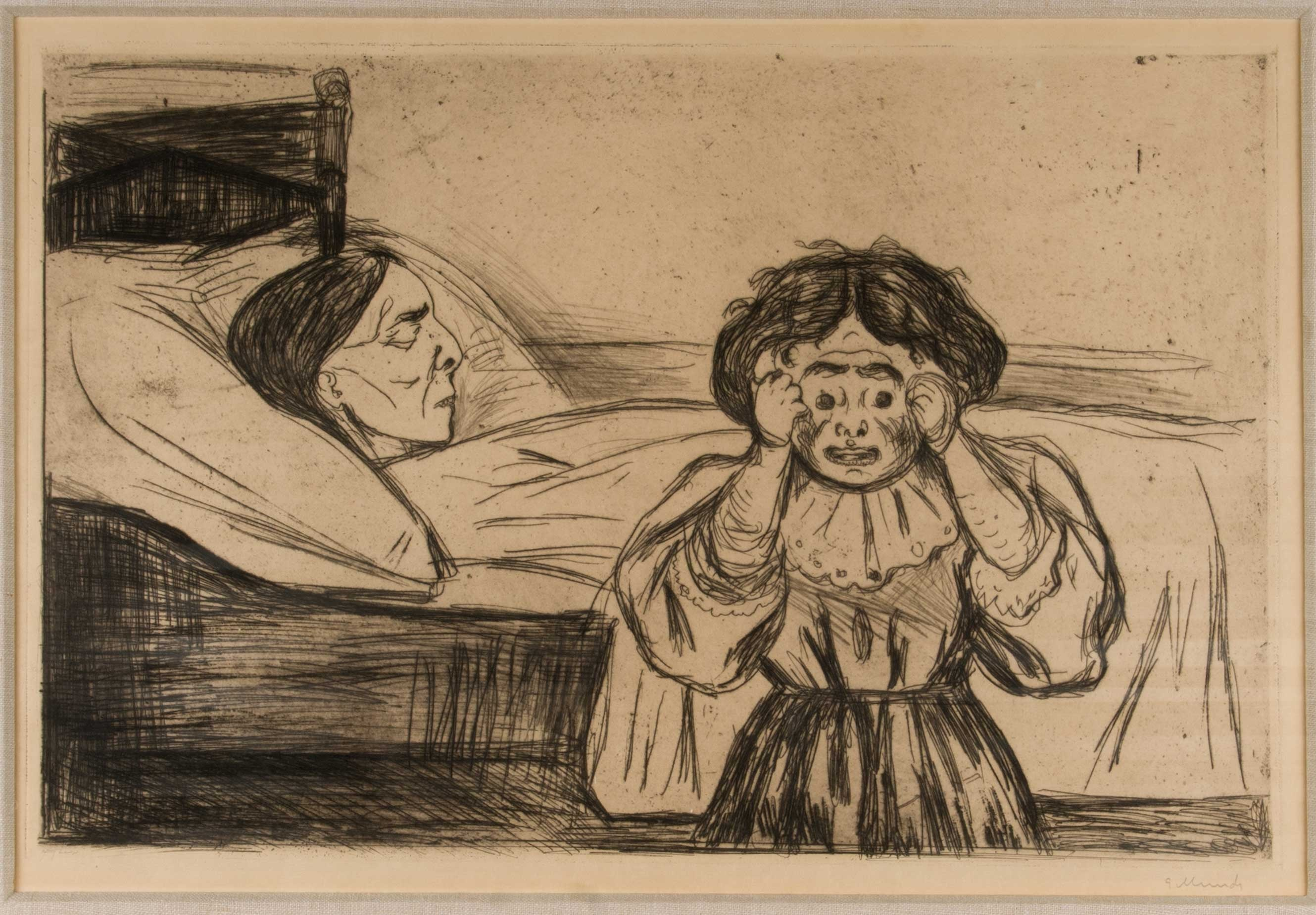
- Artist: Edvard Munch
- Year: 1901
- Medium: Etching
- Dimensions: 32.4 cm × 49.4 cm (12.8 in × 19.4 in)
- Location: National Gallery, Oslo

The earliest sketch of the motif is from the year 1889. Munch completed the initial painting between 1897 and 1899 which is located today in the Munch Museum in Oslo. It is drawn with a casein technique which gives the painting a dreamlike transparency. Unlike the painting from 1899 it is laid out in a landscape format and gives an insight into the wide, empty hospital room. The colouring, in particular the terracotta-red floor and the dark green walls, picks up the colours from other depictions of death by Munch, like Death in the Sickroom. The figures in the background also take poses from it, so that they can be identified as members of Munch’s family: from the left there is his youngest sister Inger facing the viewer, back to back his aunt Karen and his father Christian, Munch, who is turned away, and his brother Andreas in a pose that reminds of the painting Melancholy.

The girl in the foreground is Munch’s older sister Sophia, who was six years old at the time of her mother’s death. Unlike the people becoming blurry in the background, she instantly catches the eye with her red dress and her presence. In a way she serves as a spokesperson for the other family members and expresses their grief very directly. However, she is from another time than the adults in the background, so that Munch blends together two layers of time: the instantaneous tragedy of death and his effects on the remaining for years to come.

According to Ulrich Bischoff, the change of the first painting of 1897/99 to the second one from the Kunsthalle Bremen was typical for the artistic radicalization of Munch, which is carried out in the composition as well as the painting technique. With the change from landscape format to portrait format, the psychologizing depiction of the family and the sick room is omitted. Only the child at her mother’s deathbed is left. The painting technique also changed: The wet oil paint covers the canvas only at a few spots (collar and sleeves of the child), the facial features are drawn with oil pastel. The girl sticks out from the red-brownish floor into the dark blue area of death. Thus, it connects life and death.

A mirrored version of the motif is found on an etching made in 1901. Prints of the etching are shown, among others, in the Munch Museum and the Norwegian National Gallery in Oslo, as well as in Bremen, Chemitz, Hamburg, Leipzig, and Mannheim for the German-speaking areas.

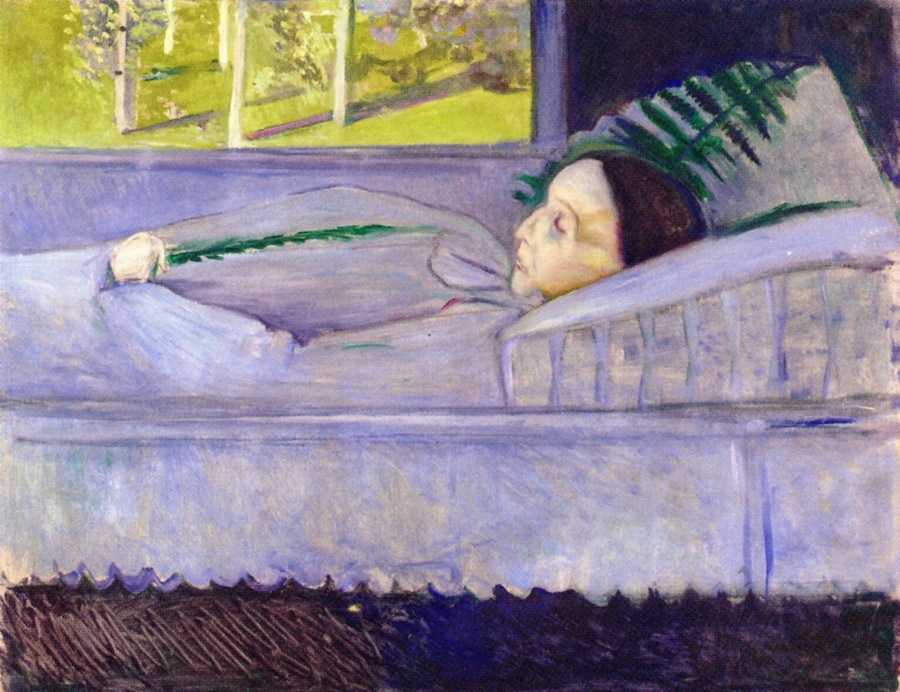
Death and Spring (1893), Munch Museum

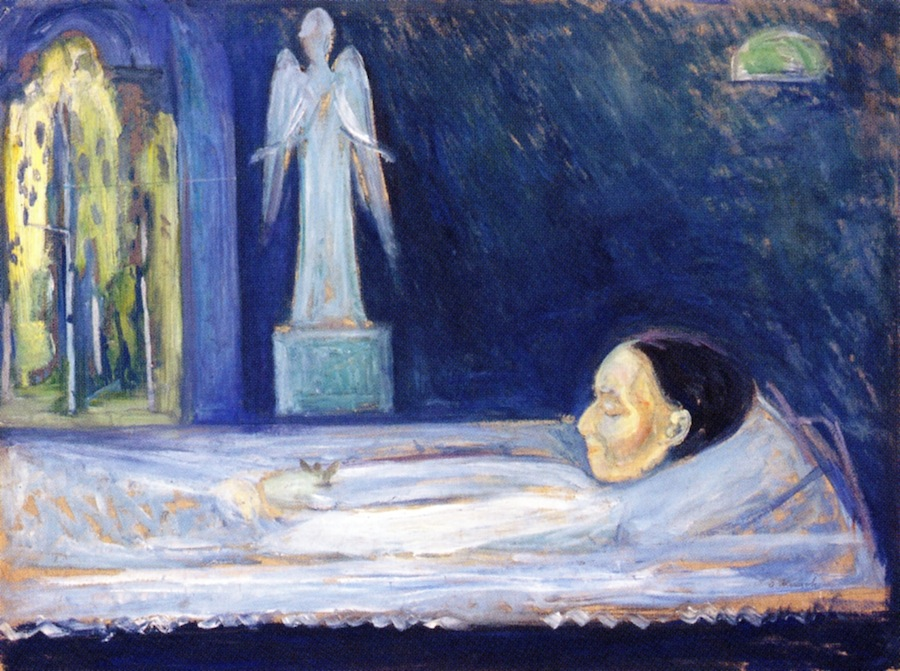
The Angel of Death (1893), Munch Museum

Two predecessors of the motif from 1893 depict the deceased mother in the deathbed without the child or other griefing relatives. They are very different in scenery as well as in style, although both were made in 1893. Death and Spring makes an allegorical statement on the nature of death and is thereby kept areal and synthetic, The Angel of Death visualizes a concrete scene and is painted in a rather impressionist manner. Reinhold Heller concludes from this that Munch used to adjust the style to the subject of his paintings.

== Sources ==
- http://www.edvard-munch.com/
