= Culloden (film) =

1964 British historical film by Peter Watkins

- The title card
- Written by: Peter Watkins
- Directed by: Peter Watkins
- Country of origin: United Kingdom
- Original languages: English; Scottish Gaelic

Production
- Cinematography: Dick Bush
- Editor: Michael Bradsell
- Running time: 69 minutes
- Production company: BBC

Original release
- Network: BBC
- Release: 15 December 1964

Culloden (known as The Battle of Culloden in the U.S.) is a 1964 docudrama written and directed by Peter Watkins for BBC TV. It depicts the 1746 Battle of Culloden, the final engagement of the Jacobite rising of 1745 which saw the Jacobite Army be decisively defeated by government troops and, in the words of the narrator, "tore apart forever the clan system of the Scottish Highlands."

Described in its opening credits as "an account of one of the most mishandled and brutal battles ever fought in Britain," Culloden was hailed as a breakthrough for its presentation of a historical event in the style of modern TV war reporting, as well as its use of non-professional actors. The film was based on John Prebble's study of the battle.

== Synopsis ==
The story begins on April 16, 1746 at Culloden Moor in Scotland. The Jacobite Army, numbering fewer than 5,000 men under Charles Edward Stuart, awaits a government army of 9,000 troops under William Augustus, Duke of Cumberland. Many of the Jacobite troops have been conscripted by their clan chiefs, and on the day of the battle they are hungry and exhausted. Cumberland's army, in contrast, is well-trained and larger in number, with the low battlefield being well-suited to its cavalry and artillery units.

Stuart's army starts the battle by firing artillery at government troops, though it does not reach them. Cumberland's artillery units respond by firing roundshot, which inflicts heavy casualties among the Jacobite troops. Stuart orders his troops to hold the line in order to tempt the government army into advancing. After enduring 29 minutes of artillery fire, Stuart finally orders his army to advance. The Jacobite army initiates a highland charge, but takes heavy losses from grapeshot and crossfire. As Stuart and his army withdraw in disarray, two Jacobite Irish units of 150 men perform a last stand but are cut down by government cavalry.

The battle is a clear victory for Cumberland's army, which suffers only 50 casualties while the Jacobites suffer 1,200. In the aftermath of the battle, nearly 100 Jacobites are killed or injured by government troops while fleeing to the Jacobite capital of Inverness. Government authorities sentence captured Jacobites to imprisonment, execution or penal transportation to the American colonies. Stuart, believing his Jacobite followers to have betrayed him, plots to leave Scotland. He disbands the remnants of his army, absconds with their funds and escapes to France after a five-month manhunt. Meanwhile, government troops engage in a brutal pacification campaign to root out remaining Jacobites.

== Production ==
In late 1962 Watkins was engaged as an assistant producer for the BBC's newly established Channel 2, and was later approached by head of the documentary film department Huw Wheldon, to produce a film on the Battle of Culloden. Culloden was to be Watkins's first full-length film. It was also his first use of his docudrama style in which actors portray historical characters being interviewed by filmmakers on the scene as though it were happening in front of news cameras. The film was produced on a low budget, with only a handful of extras and a single cannon. Watkins made use of carefully planned camera angles to give the appearance of an army.

Watkins also "wanted to break through the conventional use of professional actors in historical melodramas, with the comfortable avoidance of reality that these provide, and to use amateurs—ordinary people—in a reconstruction of their own history." He accordingly used an all-amateur cast from London and the Scottish Lowlands for the Hanoverian forces, and people from Inverness for the Jacobite army, many of whom were direct descendants of those who had been killed on Culloden Moor. This later became a central technique of Watkins's filmmaking.

Filming took place in August 1964, near Inverness. According to an estimate by the cinematographer for the film, Dick Bush, about 85% of all camerawork in Culloden was hand-held. This cinéma vérité-style shooting gave an already gritty reality a sense of present action.

== Reception ==
On review aggregator Rotten Tomatoes, 100% of five reviews are positive. The film was hailed by British critics after its first airing in 1964, and according to Watkins it remains his only film to have been broadly accepted in the UK, with the possible exception of Edvard Munch (1974). In 1965 it won both a Society of Film and Television Arts (BAFTA) TV Award for Specialised Programmes and the British Screenwriters' Award of Merit. In a list of the 100 Greatest British Television Programmes drawn up by the British Film Institute in 2000, voted for by industry professionals, Culloden was placed 64th. Writing for Eye for Film, Amber Wilkinson praised Culloden, commenting that "the mastery of [Watkins's] direction is obvious from first to last".

== Production crew ==
- Production design – Anne Davey, Colin MacLeod, Brendon Woods
- Makeup artist – Ann Brodie
- Sound department – John Gatland, Lou Hanks
- Production unit – Rodney Barnes, Valerie Booth, Roger Higham, Jennifer Howie, Michael Powell
- Historical advisor – John Prebble
- Production unit – Geraldine Proudfoot, Geoff Sanders
- Battle coordinator – Derek Ware

== See also ==
- Drama documentary
- Insurrection (1966 TV series)
- The Highlanders (1966 Doctor Who serial)
- Chasing the Deer (1994 film)
