= Milly Bergh =

Andrea Fredrikke Emilie "Milly" Ihlen, also known as Milly Thaulow and Milly Bergh (1 October 1860 – 10 November 1937) was a Norwegian actress and operetta singer, later a journalist, food writer and fashion designer. She also performed as a pianist and singer, and gave singing lessons for a time. She was also a distinguished women's rights activist.
