= La Commune (Paris, 1871) =

La commune (Paris, 1871)
- Directed by: Peter Watkins
- Written by: Agathe Bluysen; Peter Watkins
- Produced by: 13 Production; La Sept ARTE; Musée d'Orsay
- Cinematography: Odd Geir Saether
- Edited by: Agathe Bluysen; Patrick Watkins; Peter Watkins
- Release dates: 26 May 2000 (Germany: TV premiere); 3 July 2003 (United States); 7 November 2007 (France)
- Running time: 345 min 220 min. (theatrical cut)
- Country: France
- Language: French

La Commune (Paris, 1871) is a 2000 French docudrama directed by Peter Watkins. It tells the story of the Paris Commune, a French revolutionary government that seized power in Paris on 18 March 1871 after the defeat of Napoleon III during the Franco-Prussian War. The Commune only lasted for over two months before being defeated by the forces of Third Republic on 28 May.

The film utilizes a pseudo-documentary format, following two fictional reporters as they provide on-the-ground coverage of the Commune's rise and fall. It was Watkins' final completed feature film before his death in October 2025.

== Synopsis ==
The story starts with a meta-narrative in which actors Gerard Watkins and Aurelia Petit, playing journalists, introduce the set where filming has just ended. The inhabitants of Paris introduce themselves and their life in Paris, which is plagued with poverty, hunger and suppression of revolutionary ideas. A pro-government TV channel, Versailles, gives reports criticizing the rebellion in Paris, while journalists Bourlet and Capellier interview people for Commune TV regarding their situation.

On 18th March, government soldiers move in to reclaim the cannons of the National Guard, fearing they might be used against the new regime in Versailles. Fraternization with the army by the women of Montmartre foils the attempt to remove the cannons. Insurrection spreads quickly, and by 9am government authority has vanished.

The Paris Commune is proclaimed after elections are held on 28th March, with a number of ideologies represented in the Council. Their first orders are the suspension of payment of rent and a ban on gambling, though they also make Council sessions closed to the public. On 3rd April, Church and State are separated, a list of Principles is declared, and the National Guard march on Versailles in what is called the “Great Sortie”. The march is a complete failure – the Guard is routed by government artillery fire, and prisoners are executed or taken to Versailles. This thrusts the Commune into a state of war, and the Archbishop of Paris is arrested on 4th April.

While the Versailles army grows, the Commune establishes its administration and cracks down on spies and draft-dodgers. The Communards shut down several ‘reactionary’ papers, including a few critical pro-Commune ones, and a Women's Union is established. The Commune implements several social and economic reforms, while interviews with the actors explore contemporary problems and the production of the film.

The Versailles army begins shelling the capital, making districts uninhabitable. As different Commune Committees fail to cooperate, and the Council struggles to put its decrees into practice by lack of funds, the Jacobin Majority votes to create a Committee of Public Safety to centralize power, creating more division.

On 21st May, troops enter Paris through an unguarded gate and start executing prisoners. The Communards erect barricades and give their final words to the journalists before being shot by Government forces. The Commune holds its last session on 25th May. In the end, the Commune execute 100 of their prisoners, while the Government execute 30,000 people during the “Bloody Week”.

== Distribution ==
According to Watkins, La Sept ARTE changed their opinion on the film after seeing the finished film, regarding it as “incomplete”. The film was screened in its original length, but at the latest timeslot (22:00 to 04:00) on May 26, 2000. Watkins regarded this as an act of censorship.

The Association for the promotion and distribution of 'La Commune' later wrote a collective statement:

“Seeing the difficulties which a film of such scope encounters: the insidious censoring by ARTE on TV and their refusal to distribute the film on video, the marginalizing of the work, the refusal of French film distributors to release the film, the silence in the media... This asks questions of our capacity to prolong and develop the process of resistance and participation. This is why our Association also sets itself the objective of developing communal experience by the creation of places and spaces where discussions which propose thought, reflection, and organization against the abuse of power by the dominant mass media can take place. To initiate, propose and organize collective projects and debates around the questions which La Commune (Paris 1871) raises for us. To create free speech, with or without the institutions ... A ‘wide-angle’ vision rather than ‘tele-objective’.”

== Reception ==
Although initial reactions from French critics were mixed, others have written very positively about the film. Review aggregator Rotten Tomatoes reports 100% approval with an average rating of 8/10. On Metacritic, the film holds a mean score of 90/100, indicating "universal acclaim".

J. Hoberman of Sight & Sound magazine wrote, "Watkins restages history in its own ruins, uses the media as a frame, and even so, manages to imbue his narrative with amazing presence. No less than the event it chronicles, La Commune is a triumph of spontaneous action." Jonathan Rosenbaum called it Watkins' "latest magnum opus". Dave Kehr, writing for The New York Times, called it "essential viewing for anyone interested in taking an exploratory step outside the Hollywood norms."

The movie won the Los Angeles Film Critics Association Awards in 2005, came in 4th place in Village Voice Film Poll for "Best Film of the Decade" in 2009, and in 2016, Michael Atkinson of The Village Voice listed it as the greatest film since 2000. In July 2025, it ranked number 90 on Rolling Stone's list of "The 100 Best Movies of the 21st Century."

== See also ==
- List of longest films

== Bibliography ==
- Montero Martinez, José Francisco; Paredes Badía, Israel (2011). Imágenes de la revolución : la inglesa y el duque-Erich Rohmer; La commune (Paris, 1871)-Peter Watkins (in Spanish). Santander: Shangrila. ISBN 9788493936617. OCLC 846477210. OCLC 915516683, 808970491, 830370026.
