= Peter Watkins =

English filmmaker (1935–2025)

- Born: 29 October 1935; Norbiton, Surrey, England
- Died: 30 October 2025 (aged 90); Bourganeuf, France
- Education: Royal Academy of Dramatic Art
- Occupations: Film director; documentarian; screenwriter; producer; editor; essayist
- Years active: 1956–2004
- Website: pwatkins.mnsi.net

Peter Watkins (29 October 1935 – 30 October 2025) was an English filmmaker, documentarian, writer and film theorist. He is known as a pioneer of the docudrama and the mockumentary genres, typically with heavy political content. His films present pacifist and radical ideas in a nontraditional style. He mainly concentrated his works and ideas around the mass media and viewers' relation to and participation in a movie or television documentary.

Nearly all of Watkins's films used a combination of dramatic and documentary elements to dissect historical occurrences or possible near future events. The first of these, Culloden, portrayed the Jacobite uprising of 1745 in a documentary style, as if television reporters were interviewing the participants and accompanying them into battle. La Commune reenacts the Paris Commune days using a large cast of French non-actors. The War Game (1966) depicts the aftermath of a hypothetical nuclear attack on Great Britain. His other notable works included Edvard Munch, a biographical film of the painter of the same name, and The Journey, a 14-hour essay film about nuclear disarmament.

The British Film Institute writes "in an age when the media stranglehold on both our lives and the means by which we communicate is ever tightening, [Watkins] films remain a vital tool for considering new forms of image-making and a vibrant and engaging force in their own right."

== Life and career ==
=== Early years and education ===
Watkins was born in Norbiton, Surrey, on 29 October 1935. During the Second World War, his family moved several times. Between 1946 and 1952, he attended Christ College, Brecon, an independent all-boys school. There, he became invested with the school's dramatic society, taking on various roles.

After finishing school, he undertook National Service with the East Surrey Regiment, followed by studying acting at the Royal Academy of Dramatic Art, Watkins began his television and film career as an assistant producer of short TV films and commercials; and in the early 1960s was an assistant editor and director of documentaries at the BBC.

=== Career ===
All of his films were either documentary or drama presented with documentary techniques, sometimes portraying historical occurrences and sometimes possible near future events as if contemporary reporters and filmmakers were there to interview the participants. Watkins pioneered this technique in his first full-length television film, Culloden, which portrayed the Jacobite uprising of 1745 in a style similar to the Vietnam War reporting of the time. In 1965, he won a Jacob's Award for Culloden at the annual presentation ceremony in Dublin.

The scope and formal innovation of Culloden drew immediate critical acclaim for the previously unknown director, and the BBC commissioned him for another ambitious production, the nuclear-war docudrama The War Game, for The Wednesday Play series. The production was subsequently released to cinemas and won the 1966 Academy Award for Documentary Feature, but was banned for almost two decades, eventually being screened by the BBC on 31 July 1985.

His reputation as a political provocateur was amplified by Punishment Park, a story of violent political conflict in the United States that coincided with the Kent State Massacre. Opposition to war is a common theme of his work, but the films' political messages are often ambiguous, usually allowing the main characters to present violently opposing viewpoints which in many cases are improvised by the cast: in Punishment Park, the soldiers and dissidents were played by nonprofessional actors whose political opinions matched those of their characters so well that the director said he feared actual violence would break out on set. He took a similar approach in his Paris Commune re-enactment La Commune, using newspaper advertisements to recruit conservative actors who would have a genuine antipathy to the commune rebels. Watkins is also known for political statements about the film and television media, writing extensively about flaws in television news and the dominance of the Hollywood-derived narrative style that he refers to as "the monoform".

After the banning of The War Game and the poor reception of his first non-television feature, Privilege, Watkins left England and made all of his subsequent films abroad: The Gladiators in Sweden, Punishment Park in the United States, Edvard Munch in Norway, Evening Land in Denmark, Resan (a 14-hour film cycle about the threat of nuclear war) in 10 different countries, and La Commune in France. Freethinker: The Life and Work of Peter Watkins, is a forthcoming biography by Patrick Murphy, a senior lecturer in film and television at York St John University, and John Cook. It was compiled with Watkins's active help and participation.

Following Privilege, Watkins planned a Western film following a fictional American Indian tribe, to which Universal Studios showed interest and Marlon Brando agreed to star as a cavalry scout. However, Watkins conceived a new script in the style of Culloden, titled Proper in the Circumstances, which covered the Washita Massacre and battles in the Great Sioux War. The new script was rejected by Universal on the grounds that American audiences would not be interested in another film about George Custer.

In 2004, he wrote the book Media Crisis, which discusses his ideas of media hegemony which he called, the monoform, and the lack of debate around the construction of new forms of audiovisual media.

=== Influence ===
Citing their 1969 bed-in efforts and peace concert, an interviewer asked John Lennon and Yoko Ono, "Is there any one particular incident that got you started in this peace campaign?" John answered, "...the thing that really struck it off was a letter we got from a guy called Peter Watkins who made a film called The War Game. It was a very long letter stating just what's happening – how the media is really controlled, how it's all run, and everything else that people really know deep down. He said 'People in your position have a responsibility to use the media for world peace'. And we sat on the letter for about three weeks thinking 'Well, we're doing our best. All you need is love, man.' That letter just sort of sparked it all off. It was like getting your induction papers for peace!"

=== Personal life and death ===
Watkins resided at various times in Canada, Sweden, Lithuania and France. He had two sons from his first marriage, Patrick and Gérard. Watkins died on 30 October 2025, one day after his 90th birthday, in central France, where he lived with his wife Vida Urbonavičius, whom he married in 1995.

== Works ==
=== Short films ===
Year	Title	Director	Writer	Producer	Editor	Notes
1956	The Web	Yes	Yes			
1958	The Field of Red	Yes				Considered lost.
1959	The Diary of an Unknown Soldier	Yes	Yes	Yes	Yes	
1961	Forgotten Faces	Yes	Yes		Yes	
1963	The Controllers	Yes				

=== Feature films ===
Year	Title	Director	Writer	Producer	Editor	Notes
1964	Culloden	Yes	Yes	Yes		
1966	The War Game	Yes	Yes	Yes		Originally produced for BBC in 1965
1967	Privilege	Yes	No	No		
1969	The Gladiators	Yes	Yes			
1971	Punishment Park	Yes	Yes		Yes	
1974	Edvard Munch	Yes	Yes		Yes	
1975	The Trap	Yes	Yes			
1975	The Seventies People	Yes	Yes		Yes	
1977	Evening Land	Yes	Yes		Yes	
1987	The Journey	Yes	Yes	Yes	Yes	
1991	The Media Project	Yes	Yes		Yes	
1994	The Freethinker	Yes	Yes			
2000	La Commune	Yes	Yes		Yes	

=== Bibliography ===
- Ramos, Manuel (2016). Lury, Karen (ed.). "People Fever, The Popular Passions of Peter Watkins' La Commune (Paris 1871)". Screen. 57 (2): 197–217.
- Martínez, José Francisco Montero; Badía, Israel Paredes (2011). Imágenes de la revolución: la inglesa y el duque-Erich Rohmer (in Spanish). Shangrila. ISBN 978-84-939366-1-7.
- Duarte, German A. (2009). La scomparsa dell'orologio universale: Peter Watkins e i mass media audiovisivi (in Italian). Milan: Mimesis Edizioni. ISBN 978-88-575-0122-2.
- Duarte, German A. (2016). Conversations With Peter Watkins/Conversaciones con Peter Watkins. Bogotà: UTADEO PRESS. ISBN 978-958-725-195-1.
- Gomez, Joseph A. (November 1979). Peter Watkins. Twayne Publishers. ISBN 0-8057-9267-8.

== Awards and nominations ==
Institution	Year	Category	Work	Result
Academy Awards	1967	Best Documentary Feature Film	The War Game	Won
Asolo Art Film Festival	1977	Best Film	Edvard Munch	Won
Atlanta International Film Festival	1971	Best Director	Punishment Park	Won
BAFTA Awards	1967	United Nations Award	The War Game	Won
BAFTA Awards	1967	Best Short Film	The War Game	Won
BAFTA TV Awards	1977	Best International Programme	Edvard Munch	Won
Moscow International Film Festival	1977	Golden Prize	Evening Land	Nominated
Valladolid International Film Festival	1967	Golden Spike	Privilege	Nominated
Zinebi	1967	Golden Mikeldi	The War Game	Won

== See also ==
- List of British film directors
- List of Academy Award winners and nominees from Great Britain

== Further reading and viewing ==
- Welsh, James Michael (September 1986). Peter Watkins: a guide to references and resources. G.K. Hall. ISBN 978-0-8161-8179-7.
- Duarte, German A. (2009). La scomparsa dell'orologio universale. Peter Watkins e i mass media audiovisivi. Mimesis Edizioni Milano. ISBN 978-88-575-0122-2.
- 2001: The Universal Clock: The Resistance of Peter Watkins is a 77-minute documentary film about Watkins and the making of La Commune. The film is directed by Geoff Bowie and produced by the National Film Board of Canada. The universal clock refers to the synchronisation and the global movement of the televisions in the world, calibrated to be diffused anywhere around the globe, at any time.
- 2001: Peter Watkins – Lituania, Rebond for la Commune and Peter Watkins
