= 2011 in the United Kingdom =

Events from the year 2011 in the United Kingdom.

== Incumbents ==
- Monarch – Elizabeth II
- Prime Minister – David Cameron (Coalition)

== Events ==
=== January ===
- 1 January – Inmates riot at Ford Open Prison near Arundel, West Sussex. Windows are smashed and part of the prison is set on fire by prisoners, whose rioting was believed to have been sparked by staff attempts to breathalyse prisoners, amid allegations that alcohol had been smuggled into the prison.
- 2 January – The Montenegrin Embassy in London writes to Scottish Labour leader Iain Gray, correcting factual inaccuracies and asking him to explain comments he made during First Minister's Questions in December 2010, about the country being involved in "war crimes", "ethnic cleansing" and "a United Nations peace-keeping mission"
- 4 January – Value-added tax increased to 20% from 17.5%.
- 5 January – Music retailer HMV announces the closure of 60 stores following disappointing Christmas sales – a move which will see the firm lose 10% of its stores and will cost up to 900 people their jobs.
- 7 January
  - The England cricket team wins The Ashes series 3–1 in Australia.
  - Former Labour MP David Chaytor is jailed for 18 months for fraudulently claiming more than £20,000 in expenses.
  - The film The King's Speech, with Colin Firth playing the role of the stuttering George VI, is released in the UK. It won four Academy Awards, including Best Picture, on 27 February.
- 9 January – An investigation by The Guardian reveals details of how Metropolitan police officer Mark Kennedy infiltrated dozens of protest groups in 22 countries using the pseudonym Mark Stone.
- 13 January – 2011 Oldham East and Saddleworth by-election: Debbie Abrahams for Labour holds the seat with a 42.1% vote share and a majority of 3,558 against the Liberal Democrats. The by-election was triggered after previous MP Phil Woolas was found guilty of making false statements against an opponent during the original campaign.
- 15 January – Three former Church of England bishops are ordained as priests in the new Roman Catholic Personal Ordinariate of Our Lady of Walsingham at Westminster Cathedral.
- 18 January – A gay couple win a discrimination case against Christian hoteliers who refused to let them stay in a double room.
- 21 January
  - News of the World phone hacking affair: Andy Coulson, the former editor of the News of the World, resigns from his position as David Cameron's communications director, citing "continued coverage of events connected to my old job at the News of the World".
  - Tony Blair appears before the Chilcot Inquiry into the Iraq War.
  - Alan Johnson resigns as Shadow Chancellor, he is succeeded by Ed Balls.
- 25 January
  - Statistics reveal that the UK economy contracted by 0.5% during the final quarter of last year.
  - Sky Sports presenter Andy Gray is sacked for sexist comments made about a female football official.
- 26 January
  - Prime Minister David Cameron announces that Sinn Féin's Gerry Adams has resigned from the House of Commons by accepting the notional office of profit under the Crown of Crown Steward and Bailiff of the Manor of Northstead. Speaker John Bercow later clarifies that Adams has been appointed to the role following a denial of his acceptance.
  - Yemshaw v London Borough of Hounslow is decided in the Supreme Court, giving legal recognition to the concept of abusive power and control.

=== February ===
- 1 February – ZH (Tanzania) v Secretary of State for the Home Department is decided in the Supreme Court, requiring the best interests of children to be taken into account in deportation cases.
- 2 February – BBC executive Craig Oliver is chosen to replace Andy Coulson as Prime Minister David Cameron's Director of Communications.
- 5 February – David Cameron criticises "state multiculturism" in his first speech as prime minister on radicalisation and causes of terrorism.
- 9 February
  - Former head teacher Jean Else has her Damehood revoked by the Queen, having previously being found guilty of misconduct. She is the first person to have the honour revoked.
  - Project Merlin, an agreement on aspects of banking activity in the United Kingdom, is agreed between the coalition government and the country's four major high street banks.
  - Welsh becomes an official language of the United Kingdom.
- 10 February
  - Former Labour MP Jim Devine is convicted of two counts of fraud for falsely claiming £8,385 in expenses. Devine is the first MP to stand trial in the United Kingdom parliamentary expenses scandal and is later sentenced to 16 months imprisonment.
  - The House of Commons votes 234–22 against prisoners receiving the right to vote.
- 22 February – Four British are among the hundreds of people killed by the 6.3 magnitude earthquake in New Zealand's second largest city of Christchurch.

=== March ===
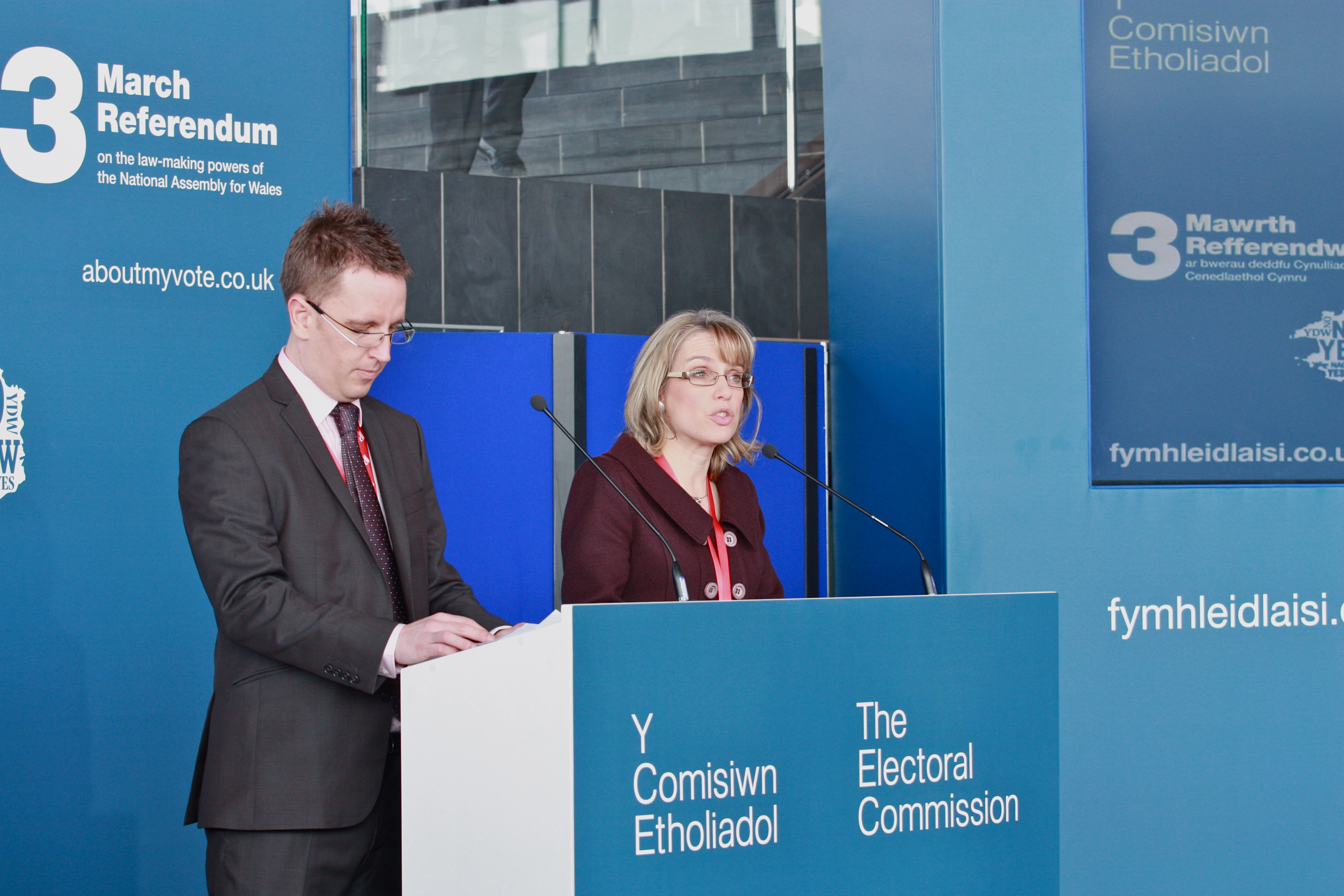
Results of the Welsh Devolution referendum announced

- 3 March
  - 2011 Barnsley Central by-election: Dan Jarvis for Labour holds the seat with a 60.8% vote share and a majority of 11,771, with the Liberal Democrats finishing in sixth place.
  - 2011 Welsh devolution referendum: Voters in Wales approve plans to give the Welsh Assembly more powers.
- 9 March – The Serious Fraud Office arrests Robert and Vincent Tchenguiz in connection with the collapse of the Icelandic Kaupthing Bank.
- 11 March – Light aircraft carrier HMS Ark Royal (1981), flagship of the Royal Navy, is decommissioned, as part of the naval restructuring portion of the 2010 Strategic Defence and Security Review.
- 18 March – Former British Airways software engineer Rajib Karim, of Newcastle upon Tyne is jailed for 30 years after he was earlier convicted of plotting to blow up a plane.
- 19 March – Operation Unified Protector: British, French and American military initiate air strikes in Libya following United Nations Security Council Resolution 1973.
- 26 March – Hundreds of thousands of people march in London against government budget cuts, with the protests later turning violent.
- 27 March
  - The 2011 United Kingdom census is conducted.
  - A 47-year-old taxi driver, Christopher Halliwell, is charged with the murder of Sian O'Callaghan.
- 30 March – The landmark case of Jones v Kaney is decided in the Supreme Court: an expert witness can be sued for professional negligence.
- 31 March – HMS Caroline (1914) is decommissioned in Belfast.

=== April ===
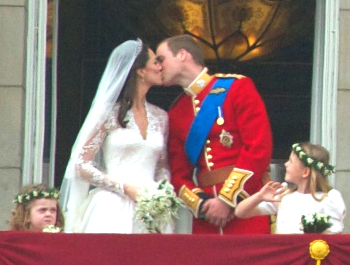
Prince William and Catherine Middleton on the balcony of Buckingham Palace during their wedding

- 1 April – The Daily Sport and Sunday Sport tabloid newspapers cease publication and enter administration.
- 3 April – The UK's last circus elephant is retired.
- 4 April – As part of the government's package of welfare reforms, the one-and-a-half million people in the UK who are claiming Incapacity Benefit begin to receive letters asking them to attend a work capability assessment. The tests are part of government plans to reduce the number of long-term claimants and will take until 2014 to complete.
- 5 April – Police investigating the murder of Sian O'Callaghan identify human remains found at a second site as those of Swindon woman Becky Godden-Edwards, who was last seen alive in 2002 at the age of 20.
- 6 April
  - The mandatory retirement age begins to be phased out, and will be fully abolished by 1 October.
  - The Competition Commission release their investigation order designed to prevent future mis-selling of payment protection insurance (PPI); most rules will come into force in October.
- 13 April – 53-year-old actor Brian Regan, most famous for his role as Terry Sullivan in the former Channel 4 TV soap Brookside, is charged – along with another man – with the murder of a man who was fatally shot in Aigburth, Merseyside, on 24 February.
- 24 April – Senior Liberal Democrat minister Chris Huhne threatens legal action over "untruths" told by Conservative MP's opposed to the Alternative Vote System, 11 days before the referendum. He also warns that the dispute could damage the coalition government.
- 27 April – The Office for National Statistics reveals that the economy had returned to growth during the first quarter of the year, growing by 0.5%.
- 29 April – Prince William, Duke of Cambridge and Catherine Middleton marry in Westminster Abbey. A public holiday is held to celebrate the day, which in conjunction with the May bank holiday, makes a four-day weekend.

=== May ===
- 5 May
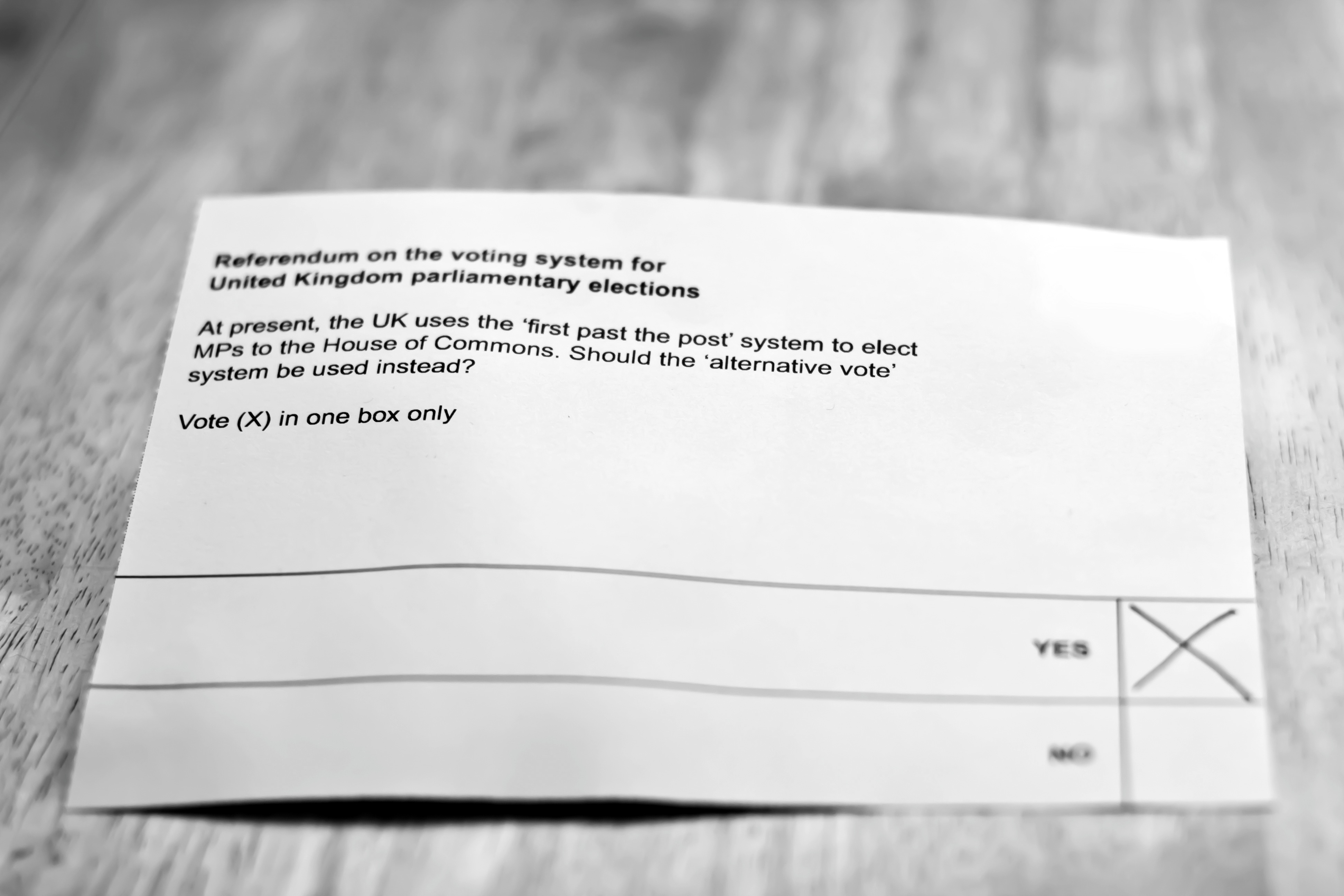
  - Ballot in the 2011 Alternative vote referendum
    Elections are held for the Scottish Parliament, Welsh Assembly and the Northern Ireland Assembly. Local elections are held on the same day together with the referendum on whether to adopt the Alternative Vote electoral system for elections to the House of Commons of the United Kingdom.
  - Claude Choules, the oldest living British born male and the last combat veteran of World War I, dies aged 110 in Australia, where he has lived since 1926. His death leaves 110-year-old Norfolk woman Florence Green, a Women's Royal Air Force waitress, as the conflict's last verified veteran of any status.
- 6 May
  - 2011 Scottish Parliament election: The Scottish National Party secure a victory, winning an overall majority in the Scottish parliament.
  - 2011 United Kingdom Alternative Vote referendum: Voters reject proposals to introduce the alternative voting system in the UK by a two-thirds majority.
  - 2011 Leicester South by-election: Labour candidate Jonathan Ashworth wins the seat with a vote share of 57.8% and a majority of 12,078.
  - 2011 United Kingdom local elections: The counting of votes in local elections in England and Northern Ireland continues with the Labour Party making gains and the Liberal Democrats losing seats.
- 7 May
  - 2011 Northern Ireland Assembly election: Counting finishes with the DUP winning 38 of the 108 seats, and Sinn Féin following with 29 seats.
  - 2011 National Assembly for Wales election: The Welsh Labour Party win 30 of the 60 Welsh Assembly seats in Thursday's election and plan to form a one-party government.
- 12 May – Queen Elizabeth II becomes the second-longest-reigning British monarch.
- 13 May – The Roman Catholic Church in England and Wales announces a reinstatement of the rule of abstinence from eating red meat on Fridays for its followers. The practice, last observed officially in 1984, will be reintroduced on 16 September to coincide with the first anniversary of the Pope Benedict XVI's visit to the United Kingdom.
- 14 May – The city of Manchester celebrates as Manchester United seal their record 19th top division league title and Manchester City win the FA Cup to end their 35-year wait for a major trophy.
- 17–20 May – Queen Elizabeth II makes a state visit to the Republic of Ireland, the first by a reigning monarch of the United Kingdom to Dublin since 1911.
- 22 May – The Royal Navy ends its training role in Iraq, concluding the British military Operation Telic there.
- 28 May – In a repeat of the 2009 final, Manchester United lose 3–1 to FC Barcelona in the 2011 UEFA Champions League final at Wembley Stadium, London.

=== June ===
- 10 June – 2011 Belfast West by-election: Sinn Féin's Paul Maskey wins the seat.
- 15 June
  - St Paul's Cathedral completes its £40 million restoration project. The 15-year programme of cleaning and repair was among the largest restoration projects ever undertaken in the UK.
  - The National Union of Teachers and the Association of Teachers and Lecturers confirm a co-ordinated strike across England and Wales on 30 June as part of a dispute over changes to pensions.
- 23 June – Levi Bellfield, three years into a life sentence for the murder of two young women and the attempted murder of a third, is found guilty of murdering Amanda Dowler, the Surrey teenager who disappeared in March 2002 and whose remains were found in Hampshire six months later.
- 24 June
  - Levi Bellfield receives an additional life sentence for the murder of Amanda Dowler. The jury fails to reach a verdict on the attempted abduction of another girl and the judge orders that the charge should remain on file.
  - Household furnishings retailer Habitat goes into administration. 30 of its 33 outlets are affected by the administration, as the three central London stores are being sold to Home Retail Group in a £24.5 million deal which will safeguard a total of 150 jobs.
- 30 June
  - Hundreds of thousands of public sector workers go on strike across the UK over planned pension changes.
  - The cheque guarantee card scheme is withdrawn after operating for over 40 years. The scheme ensured some cheques were honoured even if the account holder did not have sufficient funds in their account.

=== July ===
- July – The British economy grew by 0.2% during the second quarter of the year, down from 0.5% in the first quarter.
- 1 July – 2011 Inverclyde by-election: The Labour Party's Iain McKenzie wins the by-election with a majority reduced from 14,416 in 2010 to 5,838.
- 7 July – Following recent allegations that its journalists had hacked into the mobile phones of celebrities, politicians and high-profile crime victims over the last decade, it is announced that the News of the World will cease publication after its final edition on Sunday 10 July, having been in circulation for 168 years.
- 8 July – Rushden & Diamonds F.C. goes out of business after 19 years in existence, having recently been expelled from the Blue Square Premier League because of their huge debts. The Northamptonshire club had been members of the Football League from 2001 until 2006.
- 12 July – A Scottish ticket scooped €185m (£163,077,500.00) in the EuroMillions jackpot, the biggest ever jackpot win in its history.
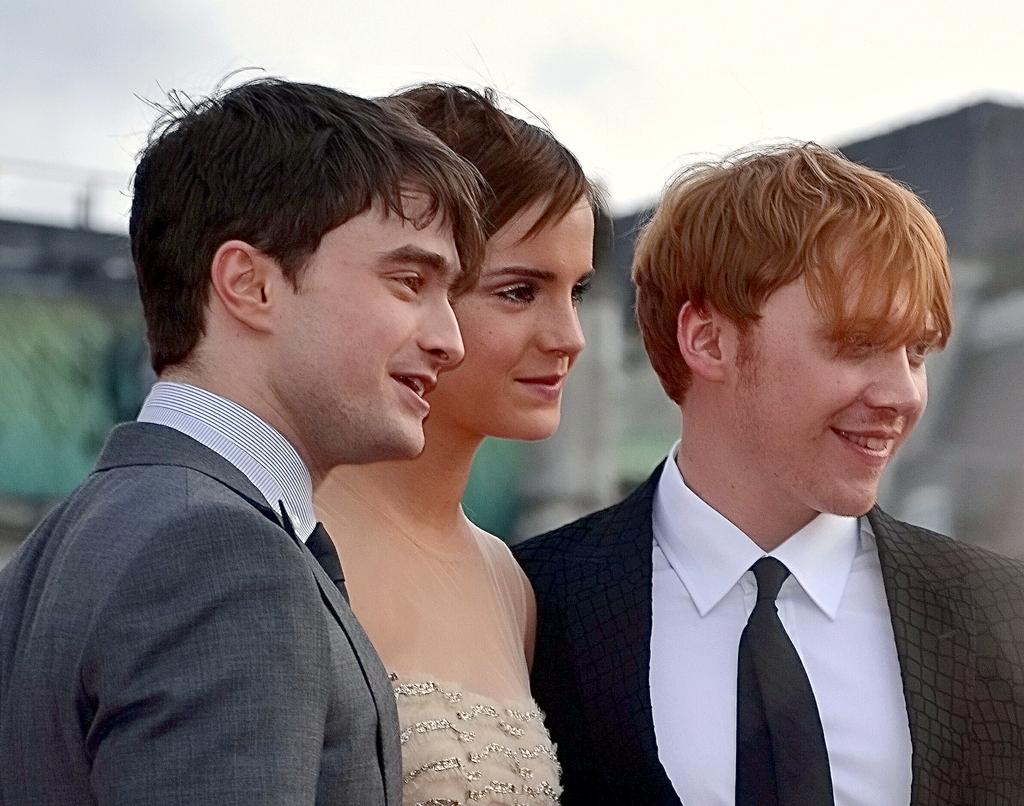
- Daniel Radcliffe, Emma Watson & Rupert Grint the lead actors of the Harry Potter films since childhood at the premiere of the series finale in London
  15 July – Harry Potter and the Deathly Hallows – Part 2, the final instalment in the Harry Potter film series, is released in UK cinemas.
- 18 July – Sean Hoare, the former News of the World reporter who made phone-hacking allegations against the newspaper which contributed to its recent demise, is found dead in Watford. His death is being treated as "unexplained but not suspicious" by police.
- 23 July – The singer-songwriter Amy Winehouse, 27, is found dead at her London home.
- 27 July – Autoclenz Ltd v Belcher, a landmark case in UK labour law, is decided in the Supreme Court: Inequality of bargaining power must be taken into account in deciding whether a person counts as an employee for the purpose of defining employment rights.
- 29 July – Wolverhampton man Bilal Zaheer Ahmad, 23, is sentenced to 12 years in prison for making calls on an internet blog for MPs who backed the war in Iraq to be murdered.

=== August ===
- 4 August – Downing Street launches a new e-petition website to encourage the public to prompt parliamentary debate on topics they feel are important. Several of the initial petitions concerned proposals for and against restoring the death penalty, last used in the UK in 1964.
- 6 August – The 2011 English riots begin.
- 7 August – The Metropolitan Police struggle to restore order in Tottenham, London after a riot the previous evening.
- 8 August
  - Prime Minister David Cameron cuts short his holiday to chair a meeting of the COBRA Committee as rioting in London continues into its third day and violence spreads across England with Birmingham, Liverpool, Nottingham and Bristol also affected.
  - The Royal Navy appoints its first female warship commander. Lieutenant Commander Sarah West, 39, will take control of HMS Portland in May 2012.
- 9 August – Further sporadic violence breaks out in several towns and cities around England, although London stays largely quiet overnight. Police say that the fatal shooting of a 26-year-old man in Croydon, London, may be linked to the rioting in the area.
- 10 August
  - Police from Scotland are sent to England to help combat riots and disorder. There are three fatalities in Birmingham, all Muslim men who were run over in the Winson Green district of the city while protecting their neighbourhood from the rioting.
  - Say What?!, English video game is released.
- 11 August – Parliament is recalled due to riots and disorder.
- 12 August – The number of deaths in the recent wave of rioting across England reaches five when 68-year-old Richard Bowes died in hospital from injuries suffered when he was attacked while trying to put out flames during rioting in Ealing, London, four days ago.
- 20 August – A pilot dies when an RAF Red Arrows aeroplane crashed at the Bournemouth Air Festival following a display.
- 23 August – An e-petition calling for the British Government to release cabinet documents relating to the Hillsborough disaster collects 100,000 signatures – enough for MPs to consider a House of Commons debate on the matter. It is the first government e-petition to reach the target.
- 31 August – Mobile internet use reaches 50% in the UK, according to the Office for National Statistics.

=== September ===
- September – Official figures show that UK unemployment rose by 80,000 to 2.51 million, the largest increase in nearly two years, in the three months to July.
- 12 September
  - The Independent Commission on Banking recommends that British banks should separate their retail banking divisions from investment banking arms to safeguard against riskier banking activities.
  - Bernard Hogan-Howe is named as the new Commissioner of London's Metropolitan Police.
- 15 September
  - The Fixed-term Parliaments Act is passed, requiring general elections to take place at fixed five-year intervals, starting with 7 May 2015, removing the prerogative of Prime Ministers to select a date.
  - Gleision Colliery mining accident: An explosion in a drift mine kills four miners in the South Wales Coalfield.
- 20 September – The UK's first commercial hydrogen filling station opens in Swindon.
- 21 September – An energy firm which has been test drilling for controversial shale gas in Lancashire says it has found vast gas resources underground.
- 26 September – Labour Party delegates vote to scrap the tradition of Shadow Cabinet elections at their annual conference in Liverpool.
- 29 September – The Department for Transport announce a consultation process on raising the motorway speed limit in England and Wales to 80 mph.

=== October ===
- 1 October – A new record is set for the highest temperature recorded in October – at 29.9 °C (85.8 °F).
- 3 October – The UK government pledges £50 million towards developing spin-off technologies from the super-strong material graphene.
- 5 October – The world's largest solar bridge project gets underway in London.
- 6 October – The Bank of England says it will inject a further £75 billion into the economy through quantitative easing (QE), but holds interest rates at 0.5%.
- 9 October – Former Beatle Sir Paul McCartney marries American heiress Nancy Shevell at a ceremony in London.
- 10 October – The trial of Vincent Tabak, accused of murdering British landscape architect Joanna Yeates, begins at Bristol Crown Court.
- 12 October – A government ban on non-EU foreign spouses under the age of 21 coming to the UK is ruled unlawful by the UK Supreme Court.
- 13 October – BP is given the go-ahead to proceed with a new £4.5 billion oil project west of the Shetland Islands.
- 14 October – Liam Fox resigns as Defence Secretary after a week of allegations over his working relationship with friend and self-styled adviser Adam Werritty.
- 17 October – Former Defence Secretary Liam Fox broke the ministerial code in his dealings with his friend Adam Werritty, an official report says.
- 18 October
  - The final episode of Doctor Who spin-off The Sarah Jane Adventures airs following Elisabeth Sladen’s death. It is named “The man who never was”.
  - The Stone Roses announce their reunion tour after splitting in 1996.
- 21 October – London's St Paul's Cathedral is forced to close its doors to visitors for the first time since the Second World War after Occupy London protesters set up camp on its doorstep.
- 27 October
  - The serial killer Robert Black is convicted of the 1981 murder of Northern Ireland schoolgirl Jennifer Cardy.
  - As police prepare to remove protestors from the grounds of St Paul's Cathedral, Giles Fraser resigns as its canon chancellor, saying he could not condone the use of violence against the demonstrators.
- 28 October
  - Dutch engineer Vincent Tabak is convicted of the murder of landscape artist Joanna Yeates and is sentenced to life imprisonment.
  - As St Paul's Cathedral re-opens to visitors, the City of London Corporation announces plans to launch legal action to evict protesters from the cathedral's grounds.
- 31 October – Graeme Knowles resigns as Dean of St Paul's as protestors by Occupy London demonstrators continue.

=== November ===
- 1 November – Junior Individual Savings Accounts replace Child Trust Funds.
- 3 November
  - Two Acts of Parliament receive Royal Assent:
    - Pensions Act 2011, bringing the state pension qualifying age of 65 for women forward to 2018 and raising it for men and women to 66 by October 2020.
    - Armed Forces Act 2011, providing for the Defence Secretary to make an annual report on progress towards 'rebuilding' the Armed Forces Covenant.
- 4 November
  - Ruth Davidson becomes the new leader of the Scottish Conservative Party.
  - Seven people die and 51 are injured after 34 vehicles collided – many bursting into flames – on the M5 motorway near Taunton in Somerset.
- 6 November – A public opinion poll carried out for the BBC Politics Show about Scotland's constitutional future indicates that devo-max is the most popular option with Scottish voters but 'no further constitutional change' is the most popular option with English voters. In Scotland, 33% backed devo-max, 28% supported Scottish independence and 29% backed 'no further constitutional change', while in England, 14% supported devo-max, 24% supported Scottish independence and 40% backed 'no further constitutional change'.
- 9 November – Supreme Court decides Kernott v Jones giving Patricia Jones a 90% interest in a family home owned jointly with her former cohabitee but to which he had not contributed since their relationship ended, a leading case on unmarried couples' property rights in England and Wales.
- 16 November – New official figures show that unemployment has risen to more than 2,600,000 – the highest level since 1994 – during September. Sir Mervyn King, governor of the Bank of England, warns that the UK is now at a great risk from the Eurozone debt crisis. Youth unemployment has also passed the 1,000,000 mark for the first time since 1986.
- 17 November
  - Scotland's First Minister Alex Salmond is named The Spectator magazine's 2011 politician of the year.
  - The UK Government sell the Northern Rock Bank – which was nationalised in 2008 – to Virgin Money for £747m.
- 19 November – Four Metropolitan Police officers are stabbed while chasing a suspect in Kingsbury, north London. Two officers are seriously injured, and a 32-year-old suspect is arrested for attempted murder.
- 22 November – Median survival periods for cancer in England and Wales have risen from 12 months to nearly six years since the 1970s, but with little change in some cancers, figures show.
- 27 November
  - Iran's parliament vote by a large majority to downgrade diplomatic relations with the UK. The move comes after the UK Treasury imposed sanctions on Iranian banks.
  - Wales national football team manager Gary Speed, 42, is found dead at his home in Chester. Speed, who had previously managed Sheffield United, had been a prominent footballer who was one of his country's most capped players with 85 appearances at senior level and also won a league title with Leeds United and was an FA Cup runner-up twice with Newcastle United.
- 28 November – The OECD warns that the UK and the Eurozone could be on the brink of another recession barely two years after the previous one.
- 30 November – Public sector workers stage a strike over government plans to make their members pay more and work longer to earn their pensions.

=== December ===
- 8 December – The Prime Minister, David Cameron, vetos a European Union treaty concerning the Eurozone crisis.
- 16 December – 2011 Feltham and Heston by-election: The Labour Party's Seema Malhotra retains the seat in south-west London for the party in a by-election sparked by the death of the previous MP.
- 17 December
  - Opinion polls show that the Conservatives have established a lead of up to six points ahead of Labour, who had narrowly led most of the polls this year, since David Cameron's veto on the European Union treaty last week.
  - Johann Lamont becomes leader of the Scottish Labour Party.
- 23 December – Prince Philip, the Duke of Edinburgh, is treated in hospital for a blocked coronary artery.

=== Undated ===
- 2011 was the second warmest year on record for the UK, according to the Met Office. Only 2006, with an average temperature of 9.73C (49.5F), was warmer than 2011's average temperature of 9.62C (49.3F).
- The UK population rose by 470,000 between 2009 and 2010, according to new figures from the Office for National Statistics – the biggest increase in nearly 50 years.

== Publications ==
- Julian Barnes' novel The Sense of an Ending
- Roger Hargreaves' children's book Little Miss Princess celebrates the 40th anniversary of the Mr. Men series.

== Births ==
- 30 September – Jamie Duffy, Thai footballer

== Deaths ==
=== January ===
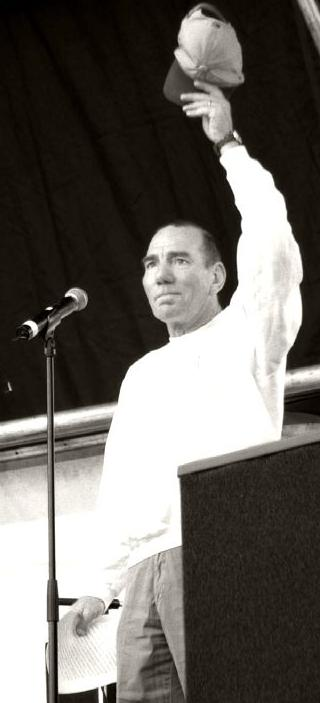
Pete Postlethwaite

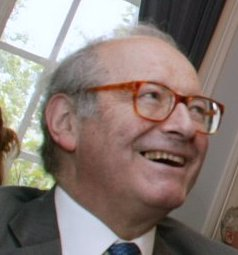
John Gross

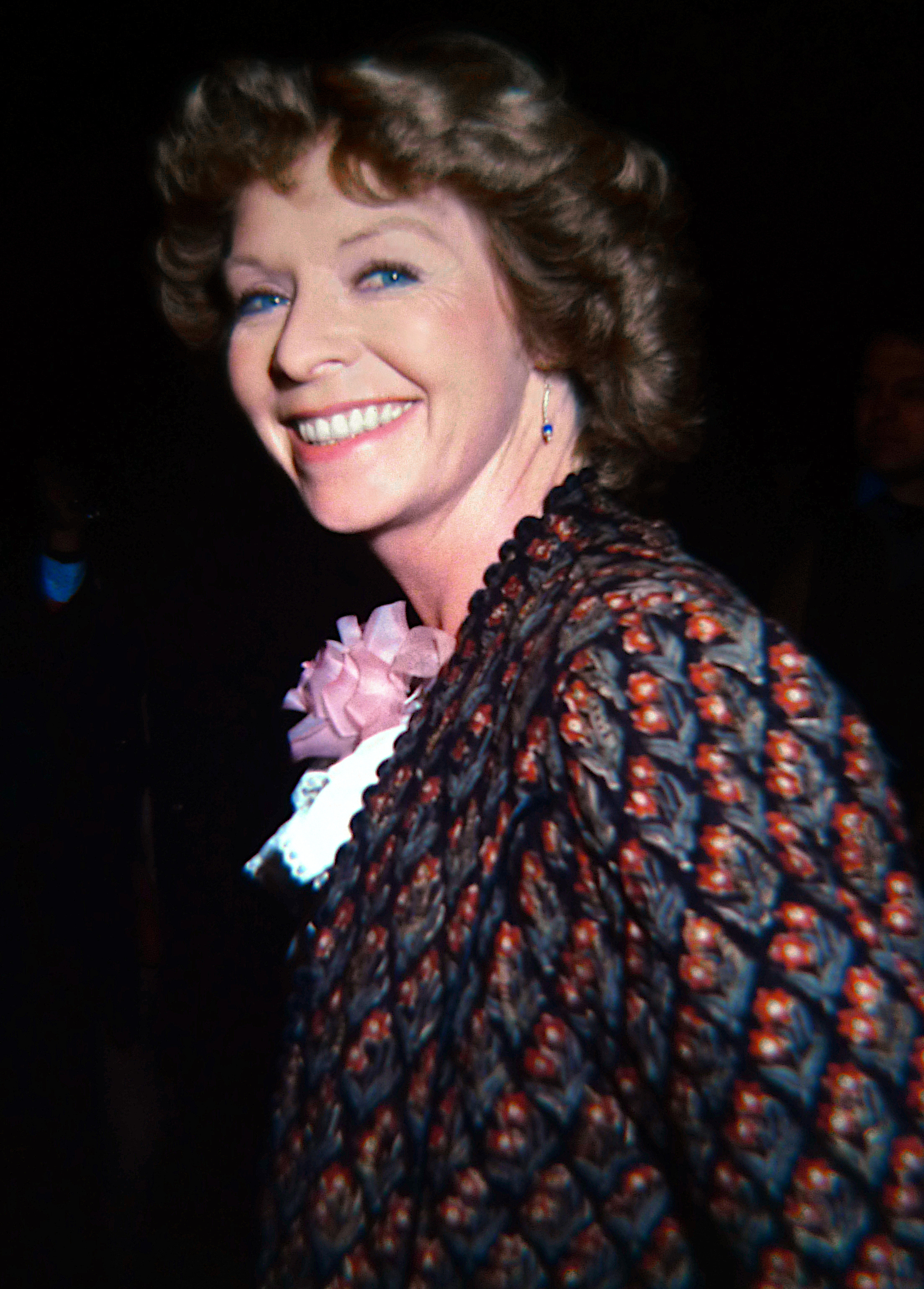
Susannah York

- 1 January – Sir Robin Carnegie, Army general (b. 1926)
- 2 January – Pete Postlethwaite, actor (b. 1946)
- 3 January – Jill Haworth, actress (b. 1945)
- 4 January
  - John Gray, physiologist (b. 1918)
  - Mick Karn, musician (b. 1958)
  - Dick King-Smith, author (b. 1922)
  - Gerry Rafferty, singer-songwriter (b. 1947)
  - Jack Richardson, chemical engineer (b. 1920)
- 5 January
  - David Hart, political activist (b. 1944)
  - Helene Palmer, actress (b. 1928)
  - Brian Rust, jazz discographer (b. 1922)
- 6 January
  - John Bendor-Samuel, missionary and linguist (b. 1929)
  - Gary Mason, boxer (b. 1962)
  - Reg Ward, first chief executive of the London Docklands Development Corporation (b. 1927)
- 7 January – Derek Gardner, racing car designer (b. 1931)
- 9 January
  - Richard Butcher, footballer (b. 1981)
  - Peter Yates, film director (b. 1929)
- 10 January
  - John Gross, writer and critic (b. 1931)
  - A. W. B. Simpson, legal historian (b. 1931)
- 11 January – Dame Barbara Clayton, pathologist (b. 1922)
- 12 January – Kenneth Stevenson, Anglican prelate, Bishop of Portsmouth (1995–2009) (b. 1949)
- 15 January
  - Kenneth Grant, occultist (b. 1924)
  - Michael Langham, actor and theatre director (b. 1919)
  - Nat Lofthouse, footballer (b. 1925)
  - Susannah York, actress (b. 1939)
- 16 January – Julian Asquith, 2nd Earl of Oxford and Asquith, peer and diplomat, Governor of the Seychelles (1962–1967) (b. 1916)
- 17 January
  - Brian Boobbyer, rugby union player (b. 1928)
  - David Bradby, theatre academic (b. 1942)
  - Sir Bernard Crossland, engineer (b. 1923)
- 18 January – John Herivel, World War II codebreaker at Bletchley Park (b. 1918)
- 20 January – Maurice Brown, RAF fighter pilot (b. 1919)
- 21 January – Wally Hughes, footballer and coach (b. 1934)
- 22 January – Sir Chandos Blair, Army general (b. 1919)
- 24 January – Phil Gallie, Conservative & Unionist MP and MSP (b. 1939)
- 25 January
  - Vincent Cronin, writer and historian (b. 1924)
  - Alison Geissler, glass engraver (b. 1907)
  - R. F. Langley, poet and diarist (b. 1938)
- 27 January – Diana Norman, writer and journalist (b. 1933)
- 28 January
  - Raymond Cohen, violinist (b. 1919)
  - Dame Margaret Price, opera singer (b. 1941)
- 29 January
  - Raymond McClean, physician and politician, Mayor of Derry (1973–1974) (b. 1933)
  - Dorothy Thompson, historian (b. 1923)
  - Norman Wilkinson, footballer (b. 1931)
- 30 January
  - John Barry, composer (b. 1933)
  - Raymond Challinor, Marxist historian (b. 1929)
  - Ian R. Porteous, mathematician (b. 1930)
- 31 January
  - Stuart Hood, television producer (b. 1915)
  - Mark Ryan, musician (b. 1959)
  - Norman Uprichard, footballer (b. 1928)

=== February ===
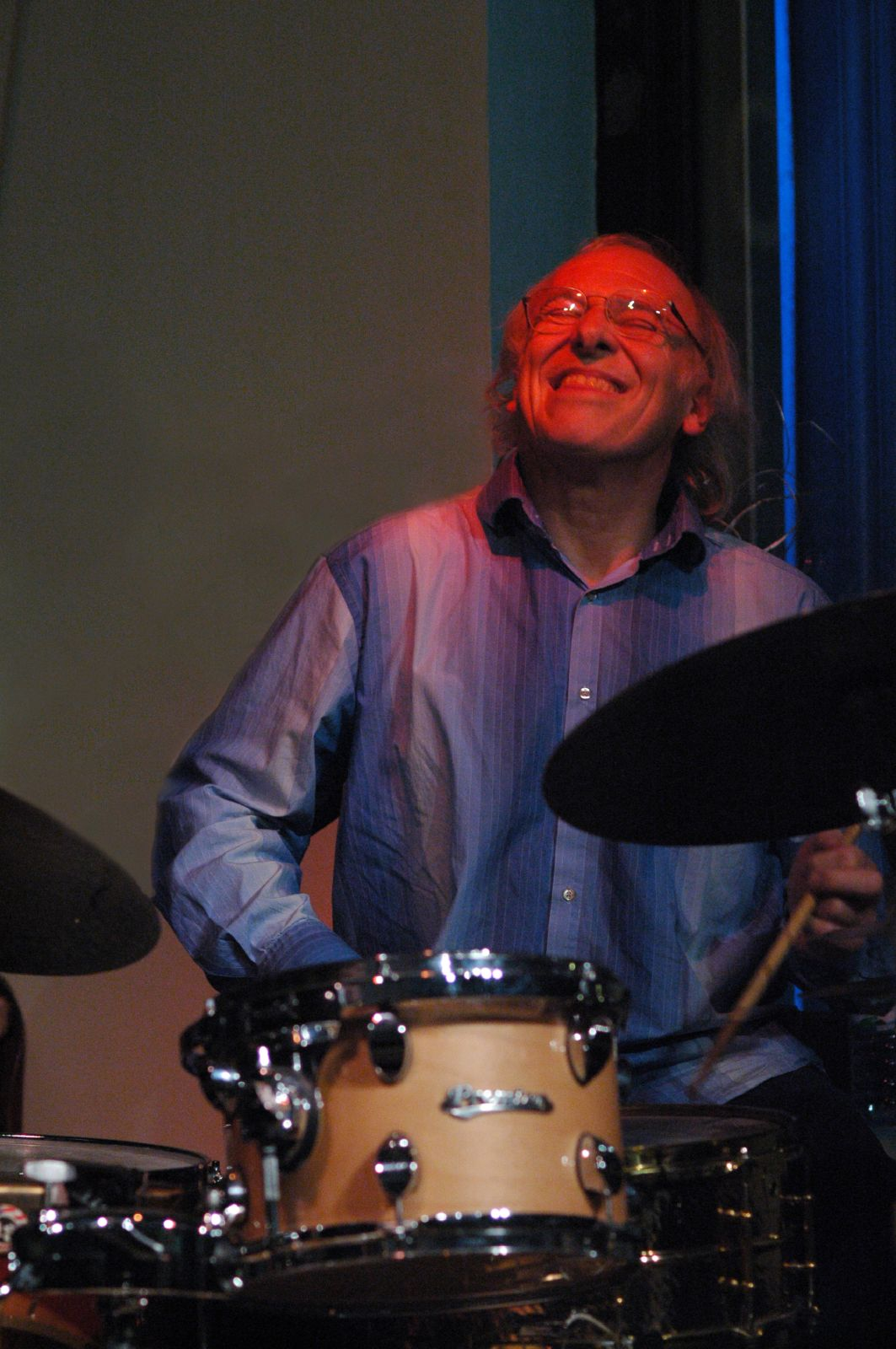
Tony Levin

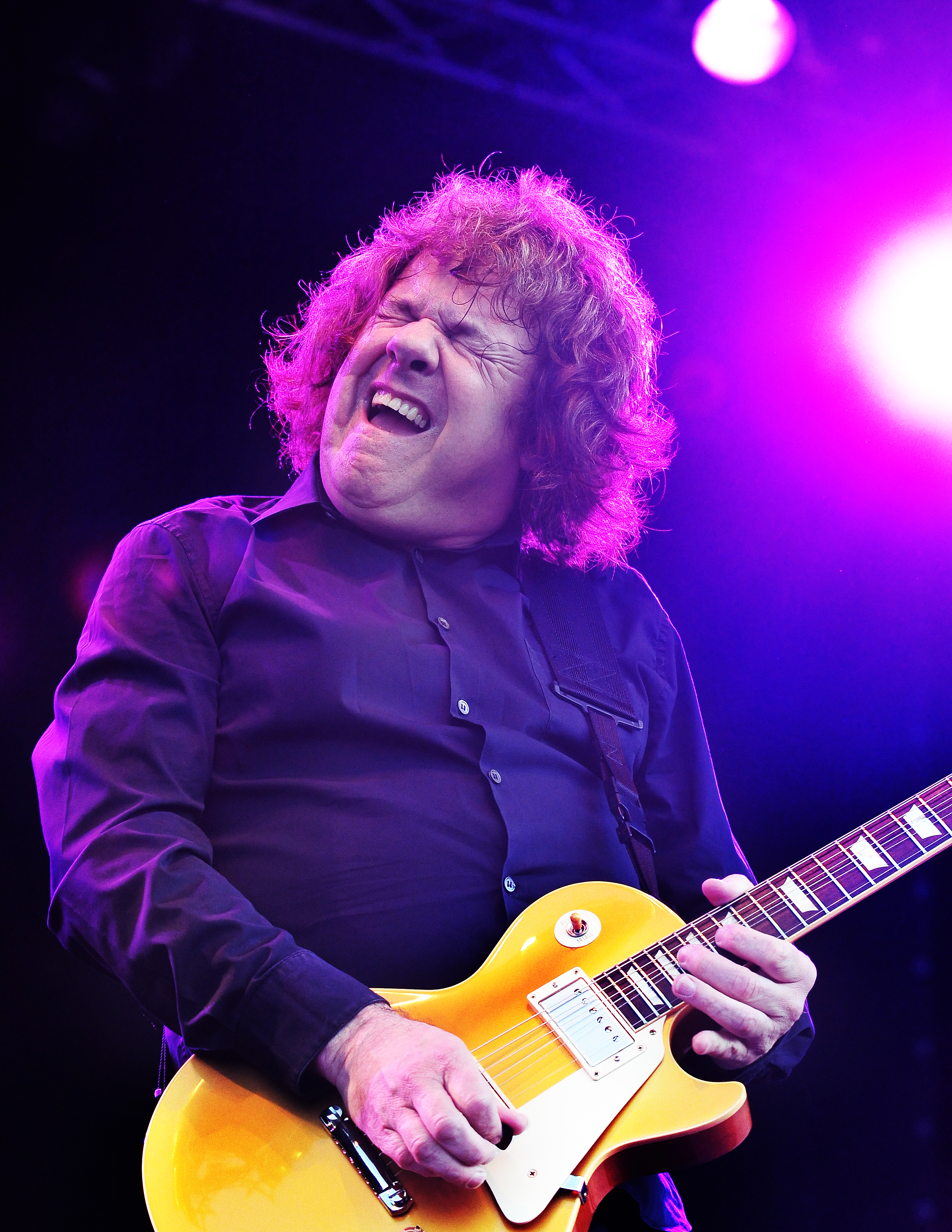
Gary Moore

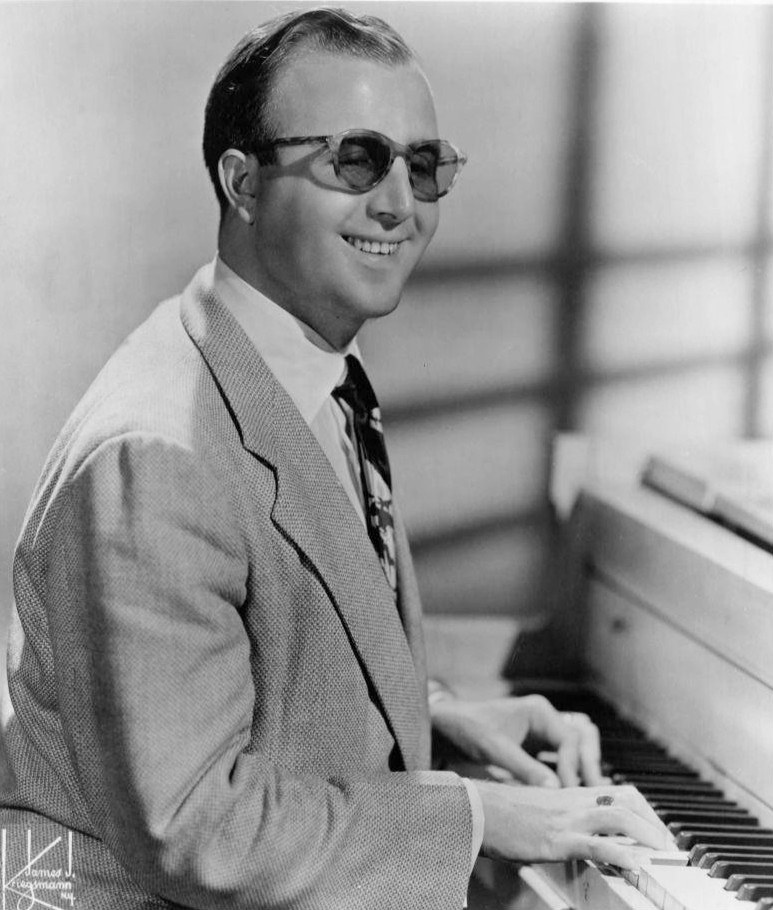
Sir George Shearing

- 1 February
  - Lennox Fyfe, Baron Fyfe of Fairfield, politician and life peer (b. 1941)
  - Derek Rawcliffe, Anglican prelate, Bishop of Glasgow and Galloway (1981–1991) (b. 1921)
  - Les Stubbs, footballer (b. 1929)
- 2 February
  - Ian Anderson, politician (b. 1953)
  - Jimmy Fell, footballer (b. 1936)
  - Rodney Hill, mathematician (b. 1921)
  - Margaret John, actress (b. 1926)
- 3 February
  - Tony Levin, jazz drummer (b. 1940)
  - Neil Young, footballer (b. 1944)
- 5 February – Brian Jacques, author (b. 1939)
- 6 February – Gary Moore, rock guitarist (b. 1952)
- 7 February – Eric Parsons, footballer (b. 1923)
- 10 February – Trevor Bailey, cricketer (b. 1923)
- 11 February – John Clay, cricketer (b. 1924)
- 13 February
  - Paul Marcus, television director (b. 1954)
  - Brian Shaw, rugby league player (b. 1931)
- 14 February
  - Peter Pilkington, Baron Pilkington of Oxenford, teacher and life peer (b. 1933)
  - Sir George Shearing, musician (b. 1919)
- 15 February – Cyril Stein, businessman (b. 1928)
- 16 February – Alfred Burke, actor (b. 1918)
- 17 February
  - Ron Hickman, inventor (b. 1932)
  - Vivien Noakes, biographer and critic (b. 1937)
- 18 February – Marshall Stoneham, physicist (b. 1940)
- 19 February – Norman Corner, footballer (b. 1943)
- 20 February
  - Barbara Harmer, aviator, first woman Concorde pilot (b. 1953)
  - Tony Kellow, footballer (b. 1952)
- 22 February
  - Brian Bonsor, composer and music teacher (b. 1926)
  - Nicholas Courtney, actor (b. 1929)
- 23 February – Matthew Carr, artist (b. 1953)
- 25 February – Peter Hildreth, Olympic athlete (b. 1928)
- 26 February – Dean Richards, footballer (b. 1974)
- 27 February – Margaret Eliot, musician and music teacher (b. 1914)

=== March ===
- 4 March
  - Vivienne Harris, founder of the Jewish Telegraph (b. 1921)
  - Charles Jarrott, film director (b. 1927)
- 6 March
  - Louie Ramsay, actress (b. 1929)
  - Edward Ullendorff, scholar and historian (b. 1920)
- 8 March – Richard Campbell, cellist and viola da gamba player (b. 1956)
- 11 March – Val Ffrench Blake, Army officer and author (b. 1913)
- 12 March – John Nettleship, teacher (b. 1939)
- 13 March – Sir Michael Gray, Army general (b. 1932)
- 14 March
  - Leslie Collier, virologist (b. 1921)
  - Bob Greaves, journalist and broadcaster (b. 1934)
- 15 March
  - Keith Fordyce, radio and television presenter (b. 1928)
  - Peter Loader, cricketer (b. 1929)
  - Smiley Culture, reggae singer and DJ (b. 1963)
- 16 March - Dennis Taylor, former president of the George Formby Society (b. 1940)
- 17 March
  - Michael Gough, actor (b. 1916)
  - Murdoch Mitchison, zoologist (b. 1922)
  - J. B. Steane, musicologist and music critic (b. 1928)
- 18 March
  - Arthur Charles Evans, World War II soldier (b. 1916)
  - Jet Harris, musician (The Shadows) (b. 1939)
- 19 March
  - Raymond Garlick, poet (b. 1926)
  - Leonard Webb, politician (b. 1921)
- 20 March – Johnny Pearson, composer and pianist (b. 1925)
- 22 March – George Alfred Walker, businessman, founder of Brent Walker (b. 1929)
- 23 March
  - Frank Lampl, Czech-born businessman (b. 1926)
  - Richard Leacock, film director (b. 1921)
  - Elizabeth Taylor, actress (b. 1932)
  - Fred Titmus, cricketer (b. 1932)
- 26 March – Diana Wynne Jones, English writer (b. 1934)
- 27 March – H. R. F. Keating, writer (b. 1926)
- 29 March – Robert Tear, operatic tenor (b. 1939)
- 31 March
  - Ishbel MacAskill, Scottish Gaelic singer (b. 1941)
  - Edward Stobart, haulage company owner (b. 1954)

=== April ===
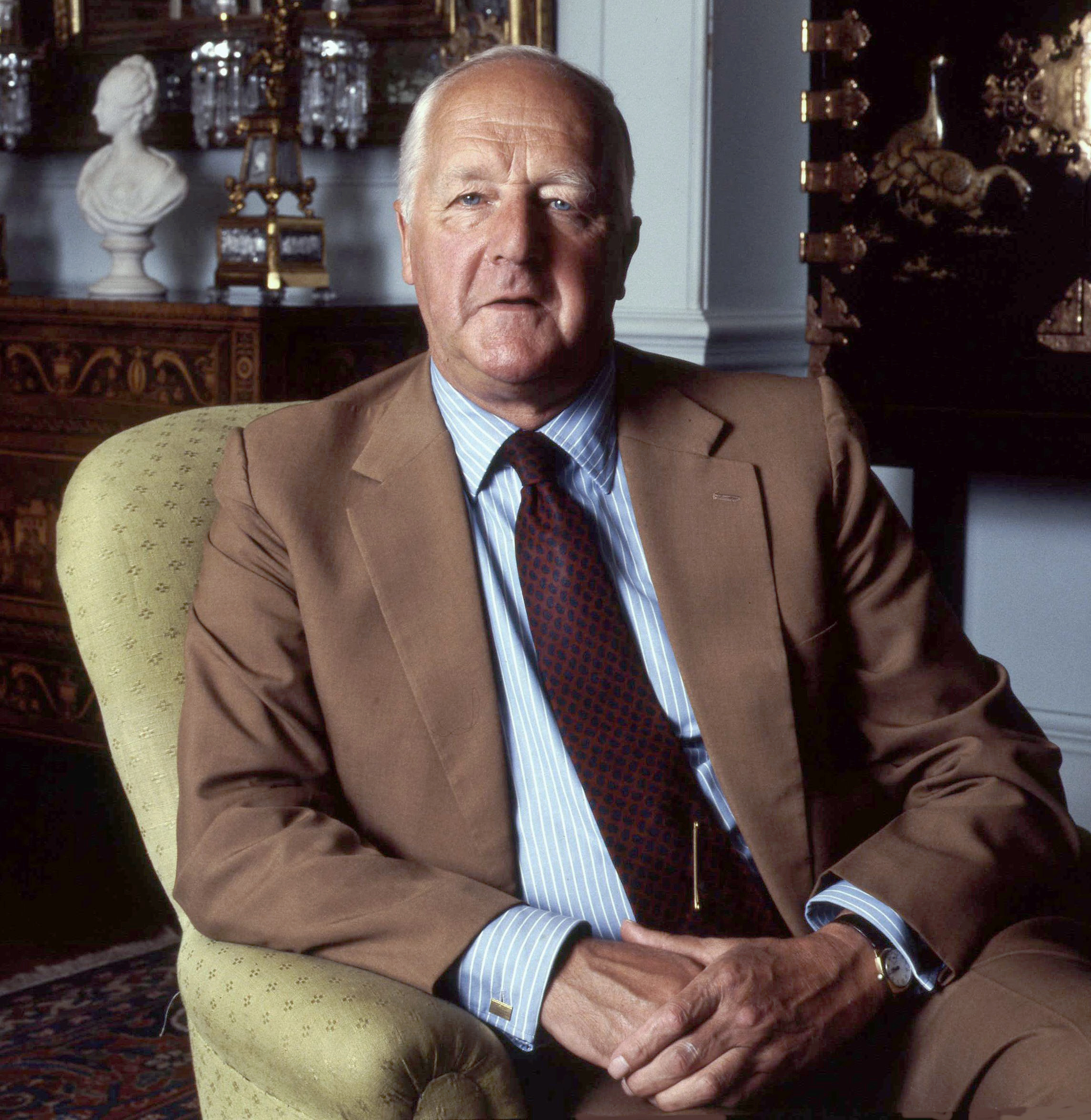
11th Duke of Grafton

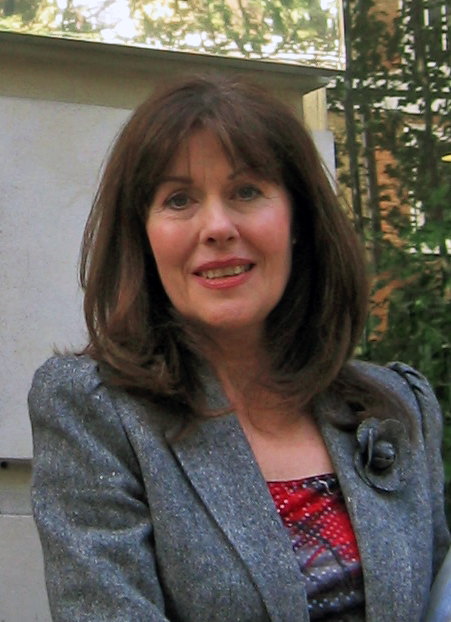
Elisabeth Sladen

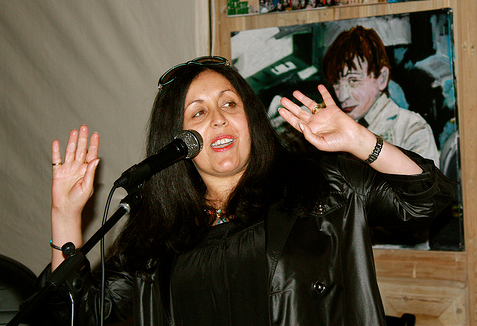
Poly Styrene

- 1 April
  - Jane Gregory, Olympic equestrian (b. 1959)
  - Brynle Williams, Welsh politician and activist (b. 1949)
- 3 April – Martin Horton, cricketer (b. 1934)
- 4 April
  - John Niven, Scottish footballer (b. 1921)
  - Craig Thomas, Welsh thriller writer (b. 1942)
- 6 April
  - Johnny Morris, footballer (b. 1923)
  - F. Gordon A. Stone, chemist (b. 1925)
- 7 April – Hugh FitzRoy, 11th Duke of Grafton, peer (b. 1919)
- 9 April – Nicholas Goodhart, rear-admiral and aviator (b. 1919)
- 10 April – Phil Solomon, music executive (b. 1924)
- 11 April
  - Jimmy Briggs, footballer (b. 1937)
  - Billy Gray, footballer (b. 1927)
  - Simon Milton, politician (b. 1961)
  - Doug Newlands, footballer (b. 1931)
  - Angela Scoular, actress (b. 1945)
- 12 April
  - Lee Bradley Brown, tourist (died in police custody) (b. 1971)
  - Ronnie Coyle, footballer (b. 1964)
- 13 April – Danny Fiszman, businessman (b. 1945)
- 14 April – Trevor Bannister, actor (b. 1934)
- 17 April
  - Bob Block, scriptwriter (b. 1921)
  - Alan Haines, actor (b. 1924)
  - Eddie Leadbeater, cricketer (b. 1927)
  - Ken Taylor, scriptwriter (b. 1922)
- 18 April – Bob Plant, World War II soldier (b. 1915)
- 19 April
  - Anne Blonstein, poet and translator (b. 1958)
  - Lisa Head, soldier (killed in Afghanistan) (b. 1981)
  - Elisabeth Sladen, actress (b. 1946)
- 20 April
  - Allan Brown, footballer (b. 1926)
  - Tim Hetherington, journalist (killed in the Libyan civil war) (b. 1970)
  - Tul Bahadur Pun, Nepalese World War II soldier (b. 1923)
- 21 April
  - Reginald C. Fuller, Roman Catholic priest and writer (b. 1908)
  - W. J. Gruffydd, poet and former Archdruid of Wales (b. 1916)
- 23 April
  - James Casey, comedian (b. 1922)
  - Terence Longdon, actor (b. 1922)
  - Geoffrey Russell, 4th Baron Ampthill, peer and businessman (b. 1921)
  - John Sullivan, writer (b. 1946)
- 24 April – Denis Mahon, art historian (b. 1910)
- 25 April
  - John Cooke, RAF officer (b. 1922)
  - Lawrence Lee, stained glass artist (Coventry Cathedral) (b. 1909)
  - Poly Styrene, rock musician (b. 1957)
- 26 April
  - Henry Leach, Admiral of the Fleet (b. 1923)
  - Islwyn Morris, Welsh actor (b. 1920)
- 29 April – David Mason, trumpeter (b. 1926)
- 30 April
  - Richard Holmes, military historian (b. 1946)
  - Eddie Turnbull, footballer and football manager (b. 1923)

=== May ===
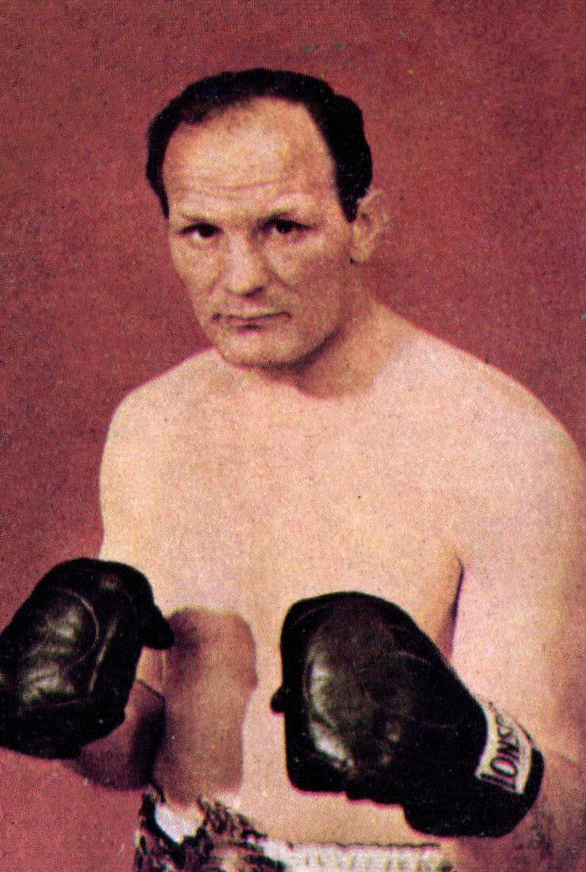
Sir Henry Cooper

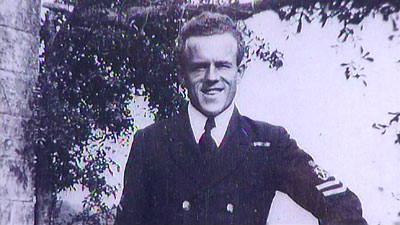
Claude Choules

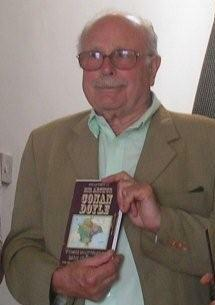
Edward Hardwicke

- 1 May
  - Sir Henry Cooper, boxer (b. 1934)
  - Ted Lowe, snooker commentator (b. 1920)
- 2 May – Eddie Lewis, footballer (b. 1935)
- 4 May – Sammy McCrory, footballer (b. 1924)
- 5 May
  - Leslie Audus, botanist (b. 1911)
  - Claude Choules, Royal Navy seaman, last living World War I combat veteran (b. 1901)
  - Dana Wynter, German-born actress (b. 1931)
- 6 May
  - Sir Geoffrey Dhenin, air marshal and physician (b. 1918)
  - Bill Hopkins, novelist (b. 1928)
- 7 May – Big George, musician and broadcaster (b. 1957)
- 8 May
  - Wallace Clark, sailor and author (b. 1926)
  - Ronald Waterhouse, judge (b. 1926)
- 9 May – David Cairns, Labour MP for Inverclyde (since 2005) (b. 1966)
- 10 May – David Weston, artist (b. 1935)
- 11 May – Elisabeth Svendsen, animal welfare advocate, founder of the Donkey Sanctuary (b. 1930)
- 12 May – Noreen Murray, molecular geneticist (b. 1935)
- 13 May – Bob Litherland, politician (b. 1930)
- 15 May – Martin Woodhouse, scriptwriter (b. 1932)
- 16 May
  - Ralph Barker, writer (b. 1917)
  - Edward Hardwicke, actor (b. 1932)
- 17 May – Frank Upton, footballer (b. 1934)
- 19 May – Kathy Kirby, singer (b. 1938)
- 20 May – William Elliott, Baron Elliott of Morpeth, politician and life peer (b. 1920)
- 21 May – Gordon McLennan, politician (b. 1924)
- 22 May – Suzanne Mizzi, Malta-born model, artist and interior designer (b. 1967)
- 24 May
  - Glyn Hughes, English poet, novelist and artist, cancer (b. 1935)
  - Blair Stewart-Wilson, courtier (b. 1929)
- 25 May – Leonora Carrington, British-born Mexican artist (b. 1917)
- 27 May
  - Janet Brown, comedian and impressionist (b. 1923)
  - Michael Willoughby, 12th Baron Middleton, peer (b. 1921)
- 28 May
  - Ann McPherson, physician (b. 1945)
  - Dame Barbara Mills, barrister (b. 1940)
- 29 May
  - Simon Brint, musician (b. 1950)
  - Billy Crook, footballer (b. 1926)
- 31 May
  - John Martin, Royal Navy officer (b. 1918)
  - Hugh Stewart, film editor (b. 1910)
  - Jennifer Worth, nurse and author (b. 1935)

=== June ===
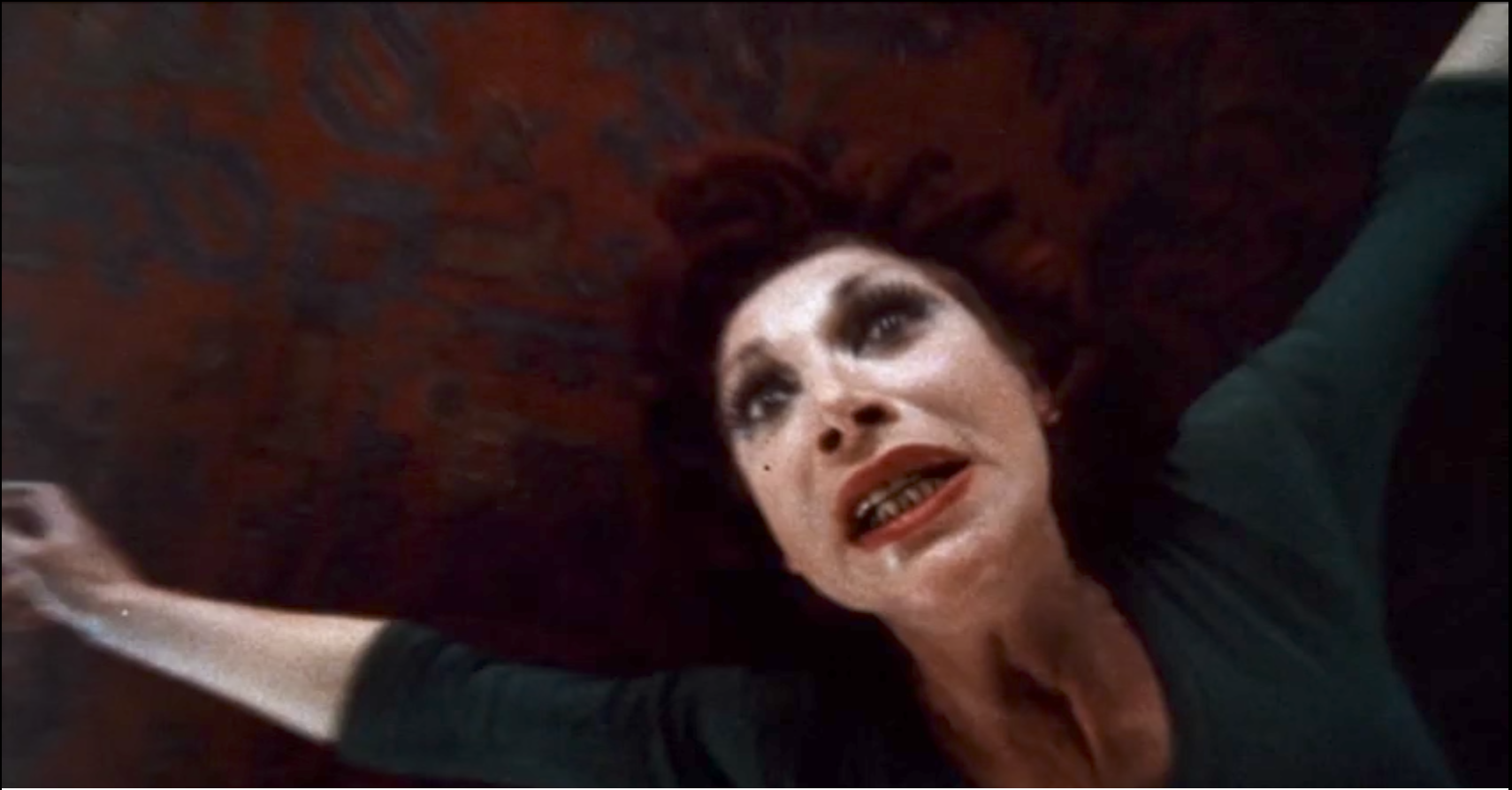
Miriam Karlin

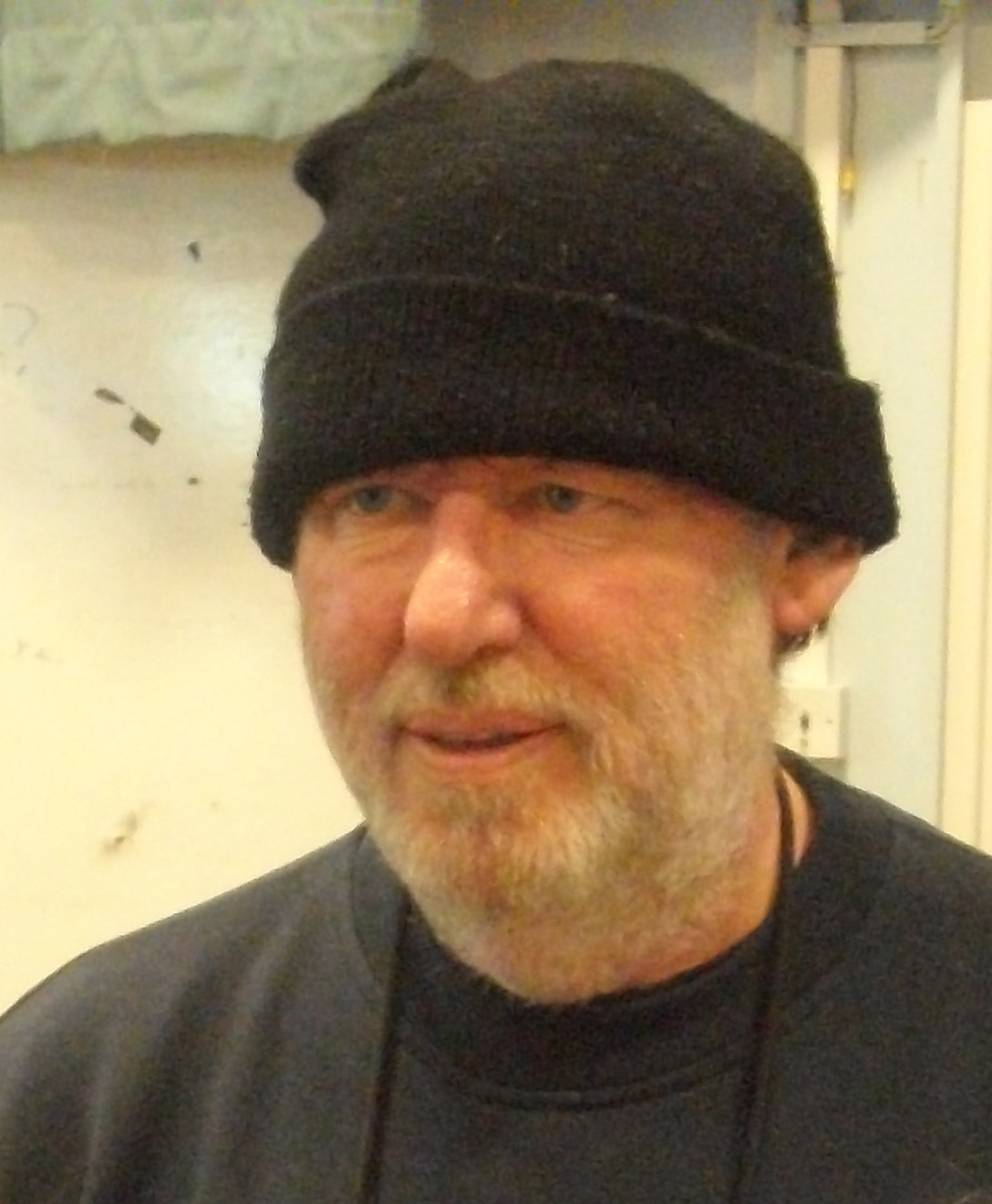
Martin Rushent

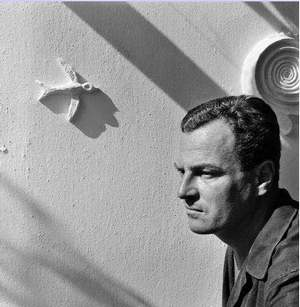
Sir Patrick Leigh Fermor

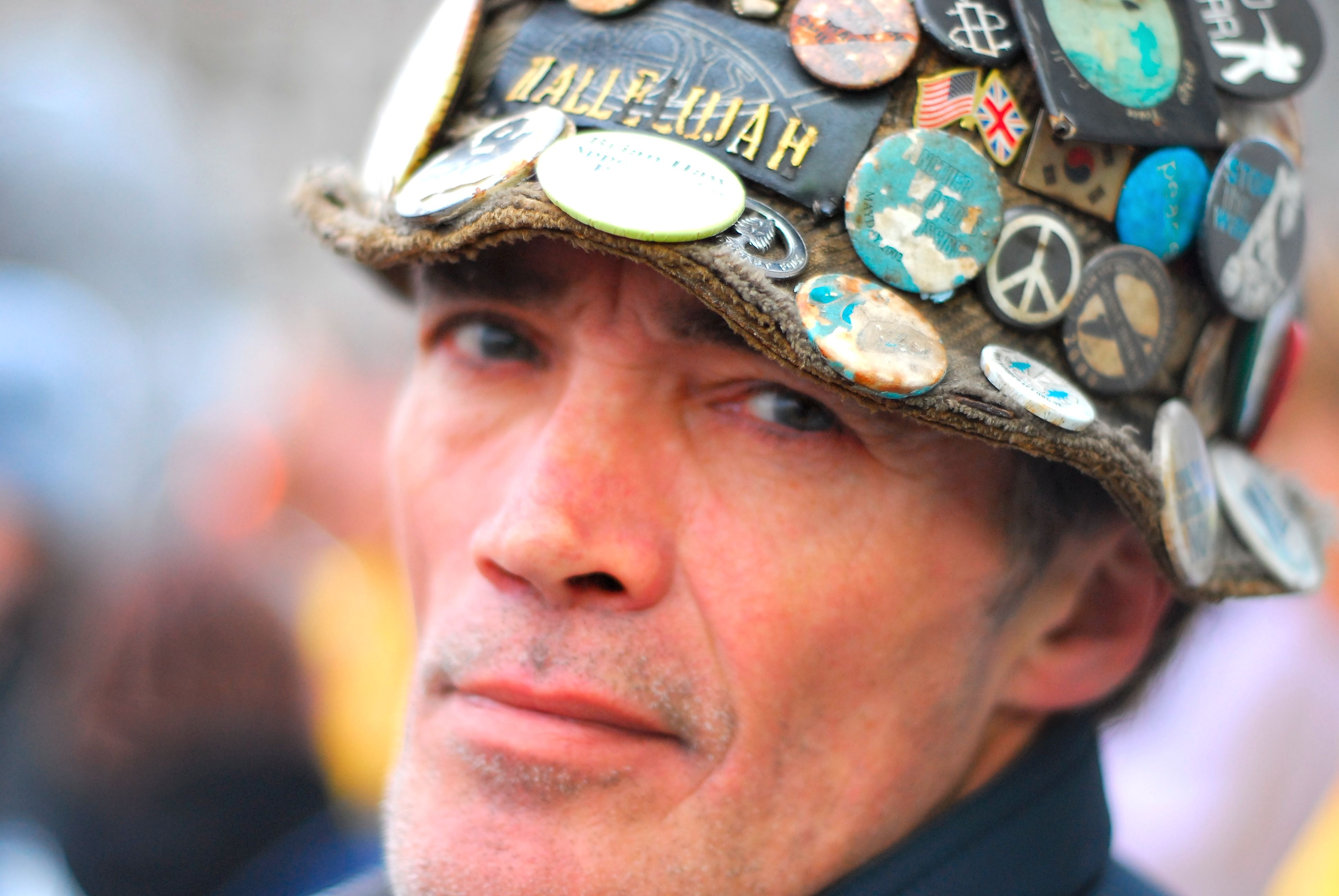
Brian Haw

- 2 June
  - Josephine Hart, Irish-born writer (b. 1942)
  - Philip Rahtz, archaeologist (b. 1921)
- 3 June
  - Pat Jackson, film director (b. 1916)
  - Miriam Karlin, actress (b. 1925)
  - Ray Pahl, sociologist (b. 1935)
- 4 June
  - Donald Hewlett, actor (b. 1922)
  - Ian Mitchell, cricketer (b. 1925)
  - Martin Rushent, record producer (b. 1948)
- 5 June
  - John Glasby, writer (b. 1928)
  - Gordon Lorenz, songwriter and record producer (b. c. 1949)
- 6 June – John Boswall, actor (b. 1920)
- 8 June
  - John Mackenzie, film director (b. 1928)
  - Roy Skelton, television actor (b. 1931)
- 9 June – Idwal Robling, sports commentator (b. 1927)
- 10 June – Sir Patrick Leigh Fermor, World War II soldier and author (b. 1915)
- 11 June – Jack Smith, artist (b. 1928)
- 12 June
  - Christopher Neame, screenwriter (b. 1942)
  - John Wilton, diplomat (b. 1921)
- 14 June
  - Ambrose Griffiths, Roman Catholic prelate (b. 1928)
  - Badi Uzzaman, actor (b. 1939)
- 15 June
  - Hugh John Beazley, World War II fighter pilot (b. 1916)
  - John Ehrman, historian (b. 1920)
- 16 June – James Allason, politician (b. 1912)
- 17 June – Jacquie de Creed, stunt woman (b. 1957)
- 18 June
  - Brian Haw, activist (b. 1949)
  - Robin Nash, television producer (b. 1927)
- 20 June – Ottilie Patterson, jazz singer (b. 1932)
- 21 June
  - Arthur Budgett, racehorse trainer (b. 1916)
  - Bruce Kinloch, Army officer and author (b. 1919)
- 22 June
  - Cyril Ornadel, composer and conductor (b. 1924)
  - Mike Waterson, singer (b. 1941)
- 23 June – Basil Mitchell, philosopher (b. 1917)
- 24 June
  - Michelle Brunner, bridge player and teacher (b. 1953)
  - Richard Webster, author and historian (b. 1950)
  - A. H. Woodfull, plastic products designer (b. 1912)
- 25 June
  - Anne Field, Army officer (b. 1926)
  - Goff Richards, brass band arranger and composer (b. 1944)
  - Margaret Tyzack, actress (b. 1931)
- 26 June – Alan Rodger, Baron Rodger of Earlsferry, judge (b. 1944)
- 27 June – Mike Doyle, footballer (b. 1946)
- 29 June – David Dunseith, journalist and broadcaster (b. 1934)
- 30 June – Sir David Loram, admiral (b. 1924)

=== July ===
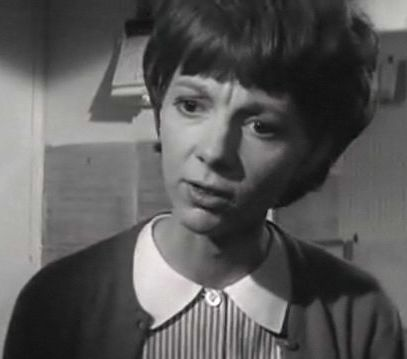
Anna Massey

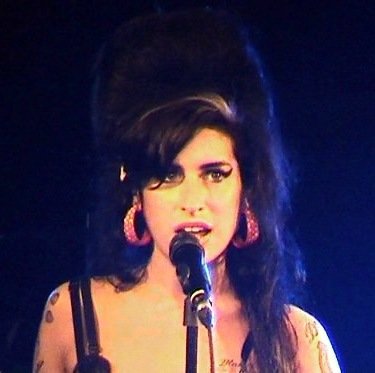
Amy Winehouse

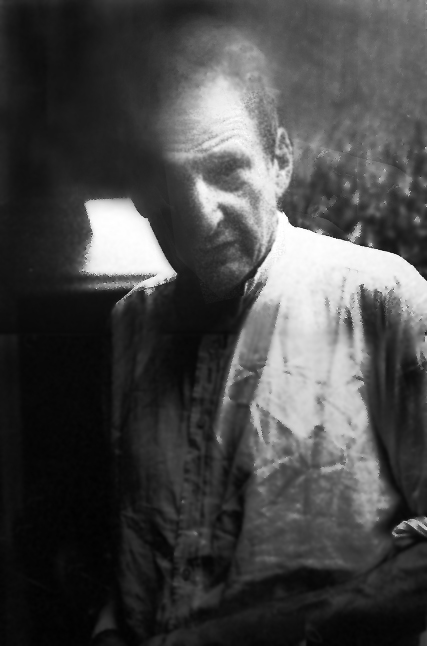
Lucian Freud

- 1 July – Willie Fernie, footballer (b. 1928)
- 2 July – Oliver Napier, politician (b. 1935)
- 3 July
  - Iain Blair, author (b. 1942)
  - Francis King, author (b. 1923)
  - Anna Massey, actress (b. 1937)
  - Roy Redgrave, Army officer (b. 1925)
- 4 July
  - John Davies Evans, archaeologist (b. 1925)
  - Scott McLaren, soldier (killed in Afghanistan) (b. 1991)
- 5 July – Hanna Segal, psychoanalyst (b. 1918)
- 7 July
  - Bill Boddy, motor sport journalist (b. 1913)
  - Frank Brenchley, diplomat (b. 1918)
- 8 July – Norman Hampson, historian (b. 1922)
- 9 July
  - Peter Newmark, translator (b. 1916)
  - Würzel, guitarist (Motörhead) (b. 1949)
- 11 July
  - Helen Crummy, social activist (b. 1920)
  - Michael Evans, Roman Catholic prelate, Bishop of East Anglia (b. 1951)
  - Alex Hay, golfer and golf instructor (b. 1933)
  - George Lascelles, 7th Earl of Harewood, peer (b. 1923)
- 12 July – Peter Crampton, politician (b. 1932)
- 14 July – Eric Delaney, bandleader (b. 1924)
- 15 July
  - John Crook, ethologist (b. 1930)
  - Ray Horrocks, businessman, chief executive of British Leyland (1978–1986) (b. 1930)
  - Googie Withers, Indian-born actress (b. 1917)
- 16 July – Geraint Bowen, poet (b. 1915)
- 17 July – Sean Hoare, entertainment reporter (b. 1964)
- 19 July
  - Sheila Burrell, actress (b. 1922)
  - Sir Julian Oswald, admiral (b. 1933)
  - Cec Thompson, rugby league player (b. 1926)
- 20 July – Lucian Freud, German-born artist (b. 1922)
- 21 July – Jack Thompson, politician (b. 1928)
- 23 July
  - Terence Boston, Baron Boston of Faversham, politician and life peer (b. 1930)
  - Conrad Meyer, Anglican prelate (b. 1922)
  - Richard Pike, chemist (b. 1950)
  - Amy Winehouse, singer-songwriter (b. 1983)
- 26 July – John Read, film maker (b. 1923)
- 27 July
  - Hilary Evans, librarian and author (b. 1929)
  - John Rawlins, Surgeon Vice Admiral (b. 1922)
  - Richard Rutt, Anglican prelate, Bishop of Leicester (1979–1990) (b. 1925)
  - John Stott, Anglican priest and theologian (b. 1921)
- 29 July – Richard Marsh, Baron Marsh, politician and Chairman of British Rail (1971–1976) (b. 1928)
- 30 July – R. E. G. Davies, aviation historian (b. 1921)
- 31 July – John Hoyland, abstract artist (b. 1934)

=== August ===
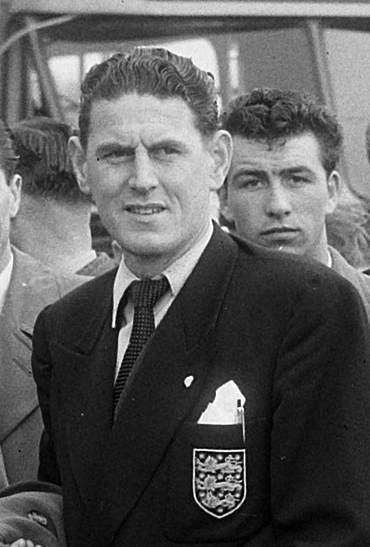
Stan Willemse

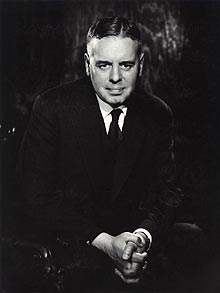
C. K. Barrett

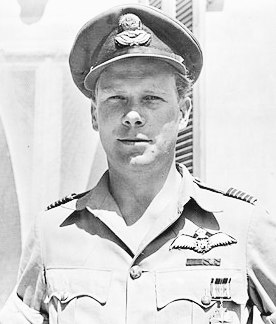
Billy Drake

- 2 August – Richard Pearson, actor (b. 1918)
- 3 August
  - Andrew McDermott, singer (b. 1966)
  - Allan Watkins, cricketer (b. 1922)
- 4 August
  - Alan Blackshaw, mountaineer and skier (b. 1933)
  - Michael Bukht, television chef ('Michael Barry') (b. 1941)
  - Mark Duggan, crime suspect (murdered) (b. 1981)
- 5 August – Stan Willemse, footballer (b. 1924)
- 6 August – John Wood, actor (b. 1930)
- 7 August – Nancy Wake, New Zealand-born agent (b. 1912)
- 10 August – Selwyn Griffith, poet (b. 1928)
- 11 August
  - David Holbrook, writer (b. 1923)
  - Paul Wilkinson, political scientist and terrorism expert (b. 1937)
- 12 August – Robert Robinson, television and radio broadcaster (b. 1927)
- 13 August – Chris Lawrence, racing driver (b. 1933)
- 15 August
  - Colin Harvey, writer (b. 1960)
  - Michael Legat, writer (b. 1923)
  - Betty Thatcher, lyricist (b. 1944)
- 16 August – Huw Ceredig, actor (b. 1942)
- 17 August – Frank Munro, international footballer (b. 1947)
- 18 August – Peter George Davis, Royal Marines officer (b. 1923)
- 19 August – Jimmy Sangster, screenwriter (b. 1927)
- 20 August – Jon Egging, RAF flight lieutenant and Red Arrows pilot (crash at Bournemouth Air Festival) (b. 1978)
- 22 August – John Howard Davies, child screen actor and television comedy director (b. 1939)
- 23 August
  - Clare Hodges, cannabis activist (b. 1957)
  - David Lunn-Rockliffe, businessman (b. 1924)
- 25 August – Anne Sharp, opera singer (b. 1916)
- 26 August
  - George Band, mountaineer (b. 1929)
  - C. K. Barrett, theologian (b. 1917)
  - John McAleese, soldier involved in the Iranian Embassy siege (b. 1949)
- 27 August
  - John Parke, footballer (b. 1937)
  - N. F. Simpson, playwright (b. 1919)
- 28 August
  - Billy Drake, World War II fighter pilot (b. 1917)
  - Len Ganley, snooker referee (b. 1943)
  - Tony Sale, computer museum curator (b. 1931)
- 29 August
  - John Bancroft, architect (b. 1923)
  - Mark Ovendale, footballer (b. 1973)
- 31 August
  - Dave Petrie, politician (b. 1946)
  - Peter Twiss, test pilot (b. 1921)

=== September ===
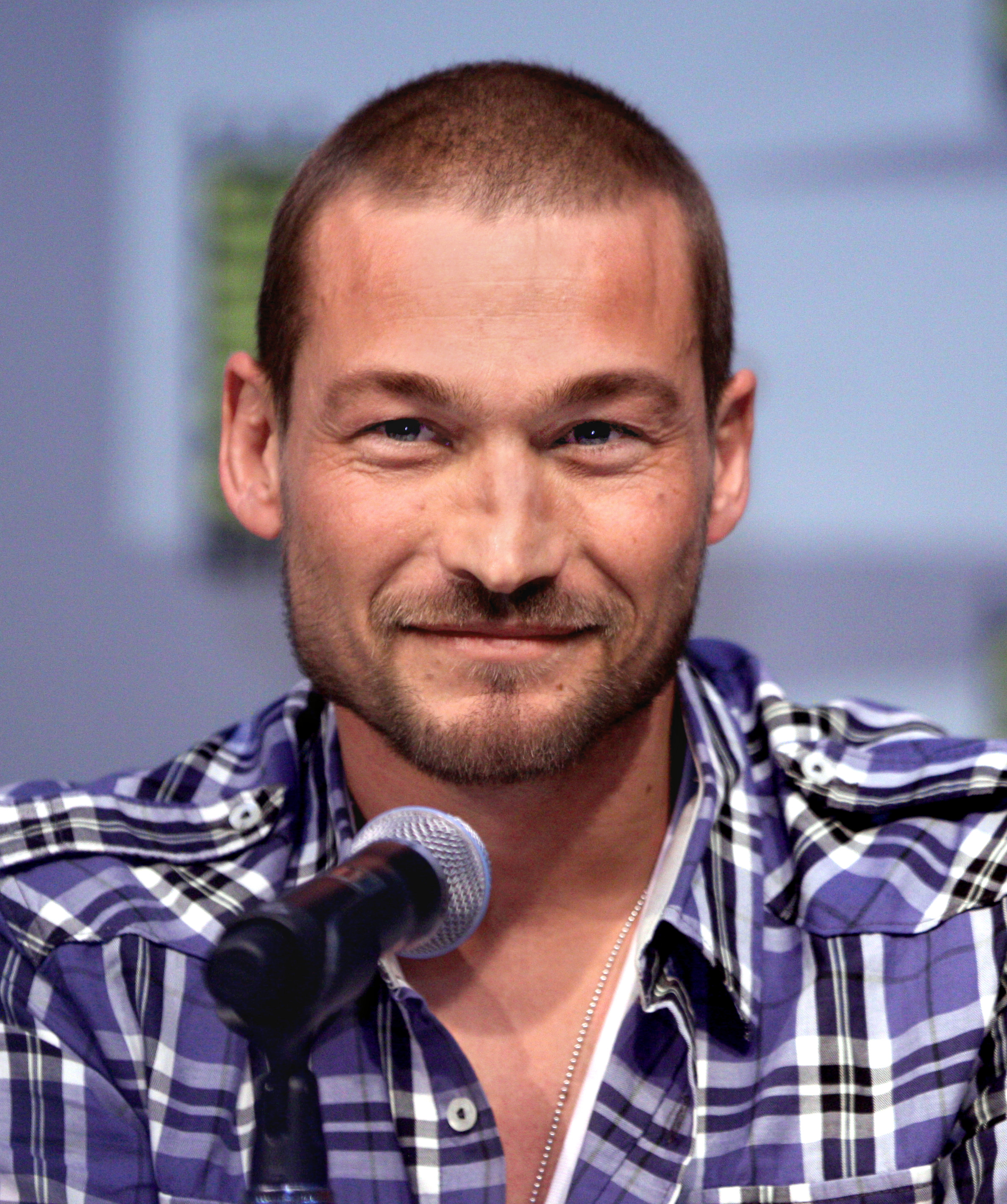
Andy Whitfield

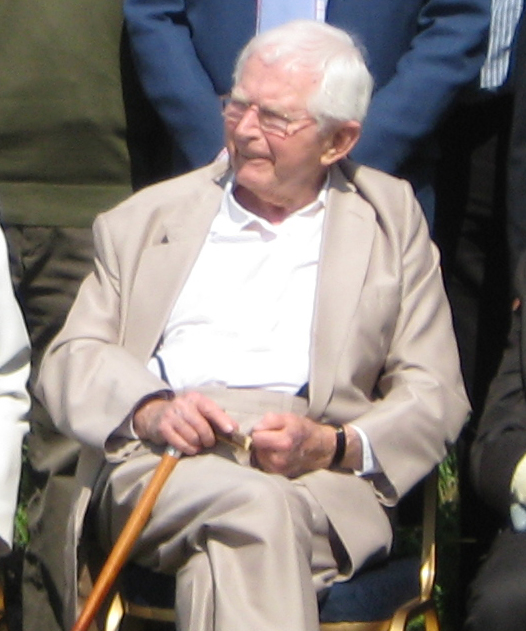
David Croft

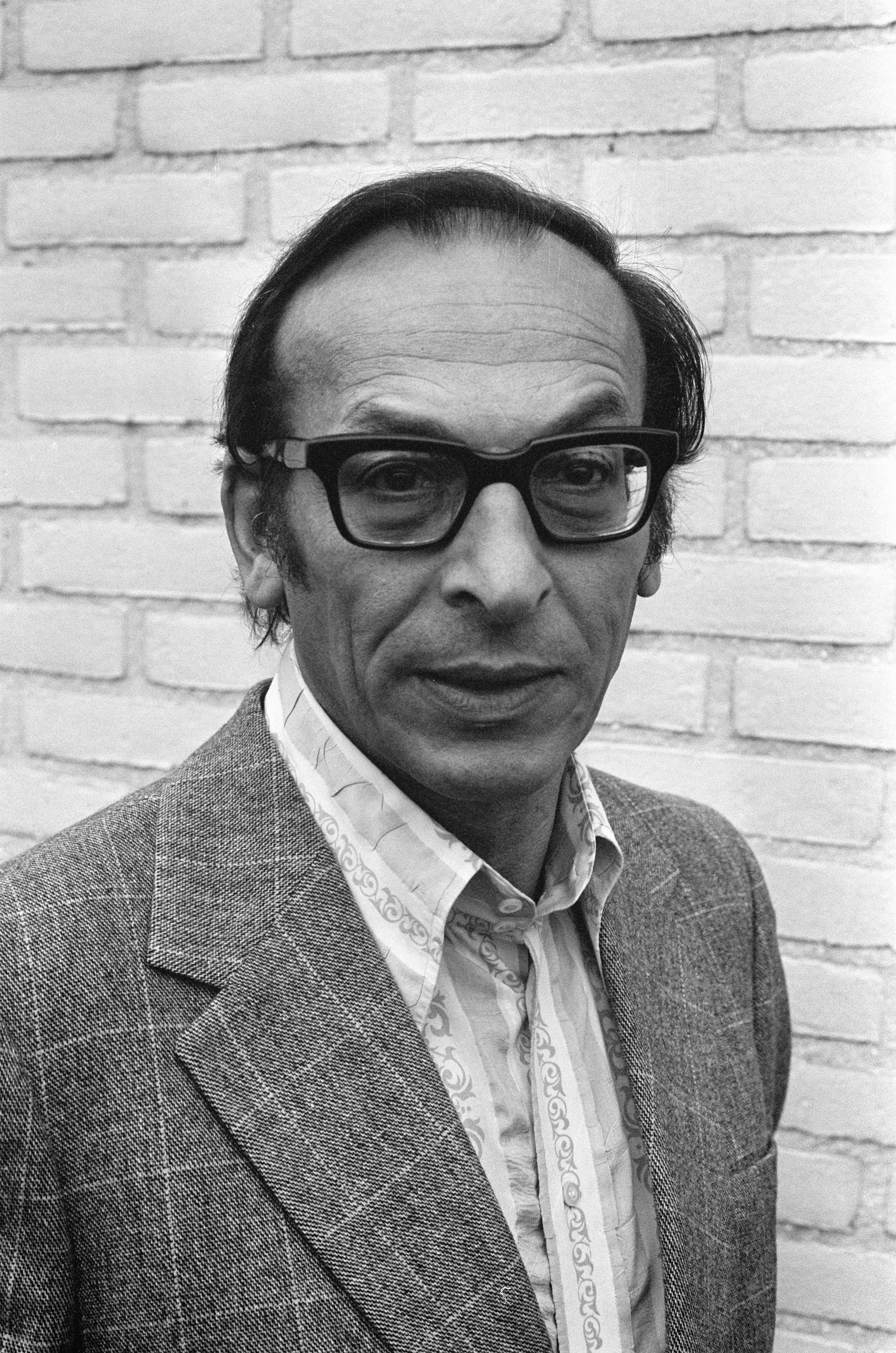
Emanuel Litvinoff

- 1 September – Mark Blackburn, numismatist (b. 1953)
- 6 September – Ted Longshaw, businessman (b. 1926)
- 7 September – Max Boisot, architect (b. 1943)
- 8 September – Sir Hilary Synnott, diplomat (b. 1945)
- 9 September
  - Graham Collier, jazz bassist (b. 1937)
  - Laurie Hughes, footballer (b. 1924)
  - Herbert Lomas, poet (b. 1924)
  - Peter Sneath, microbiologist (b. 1923)
- 11 September
  - Douglas Allen, Baron Croham, civil servant and life peer (b. 1917)
  - Ralph Gubbins, footballer (b. 1932)
  - Andy Whitfield, actor (b. 1972)
- 13 September – Richard Hamilton, artist (b. 1922)
- 14 September – Frank Parkin, sociologist and novelist (b. 1931)
- 16 September
  - Sir Brian Burnett, Royal Air Force Air Secretary (b. 1913)
  - Sir William Hawthorne, aeronautical engineer (b. 1913)
- 17 September – Peter Wright, police officer, Chief Constable of South Yorkshire Police (1983–1990) (b. 1929)
- 18 September – Paul Bach, journalist and editor (b. 1938)
- 19 September – Ginger McCain, horse trainer (b. 1930)
- 20 September
  - Michael Jarvis, horse trainer (b. 1938)
  - Robert Whitaker, photographer (b. 1939)
- 21 September – John Du Cann, rock guitarist (b. 1946)
- 22 September – Jonathan Cecil, actor (b. 1939)
- 23 September – Douglas Stuart, 20th Earl of Moray, peer (b. 1928)
- 24 September
  - Emanuel Litvinoff, writer and activist (b. 1915)
  - George Palliser, Battle of Britain air ace (b. 1919)
- 25 September – Gusty Spence, Ulster loyalist politician (b. 1933)
- 27 September – David Croft, television writer, director and producer (b. 1922)
- 28 September – Patrick Collinson, historian (b. 1929)
- 29 September – Iain Sproat, politician (b. 1938)
- 30 September – Arthur Norman, industrialist (b. 1917)

=== October ===
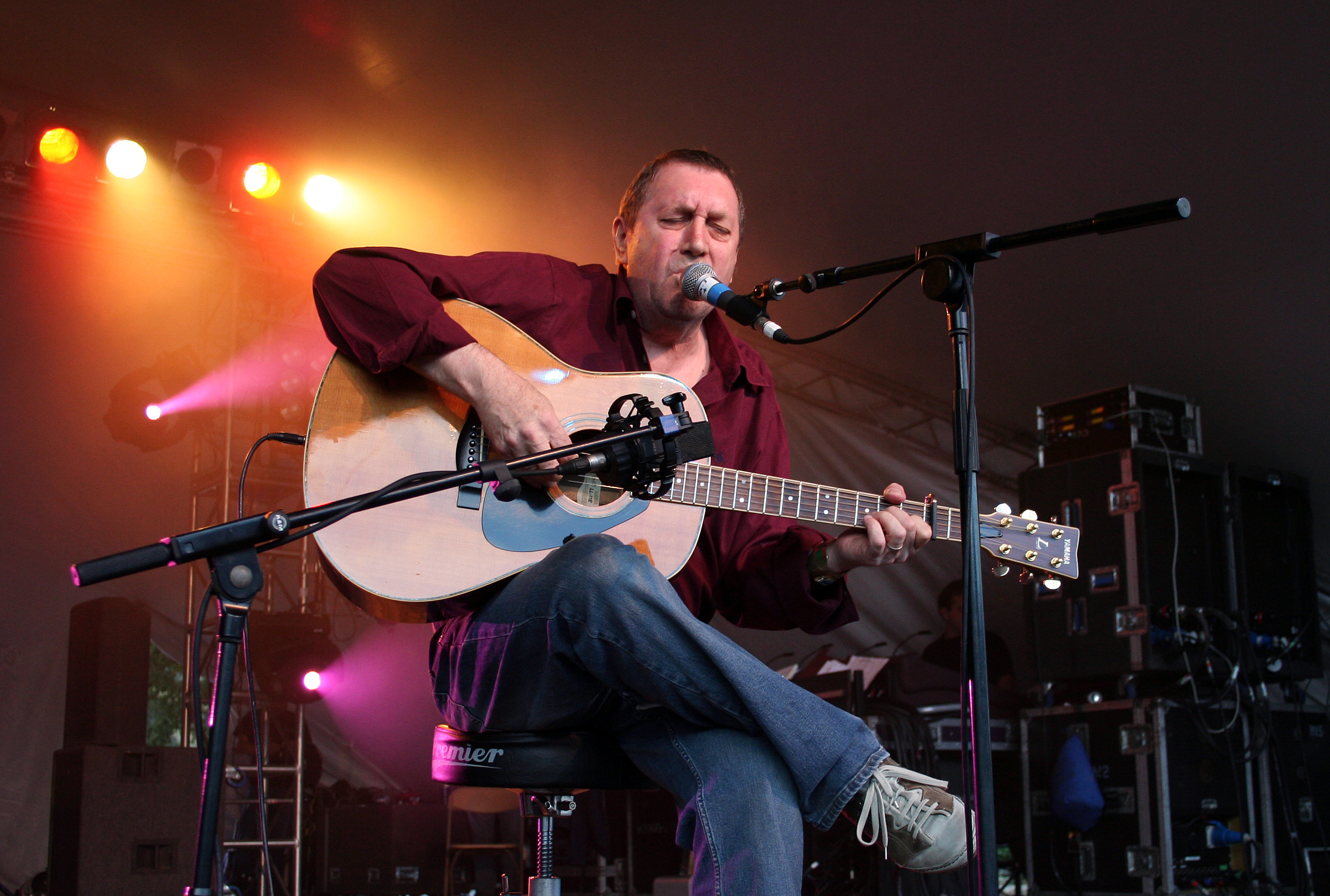
Bert Jansch

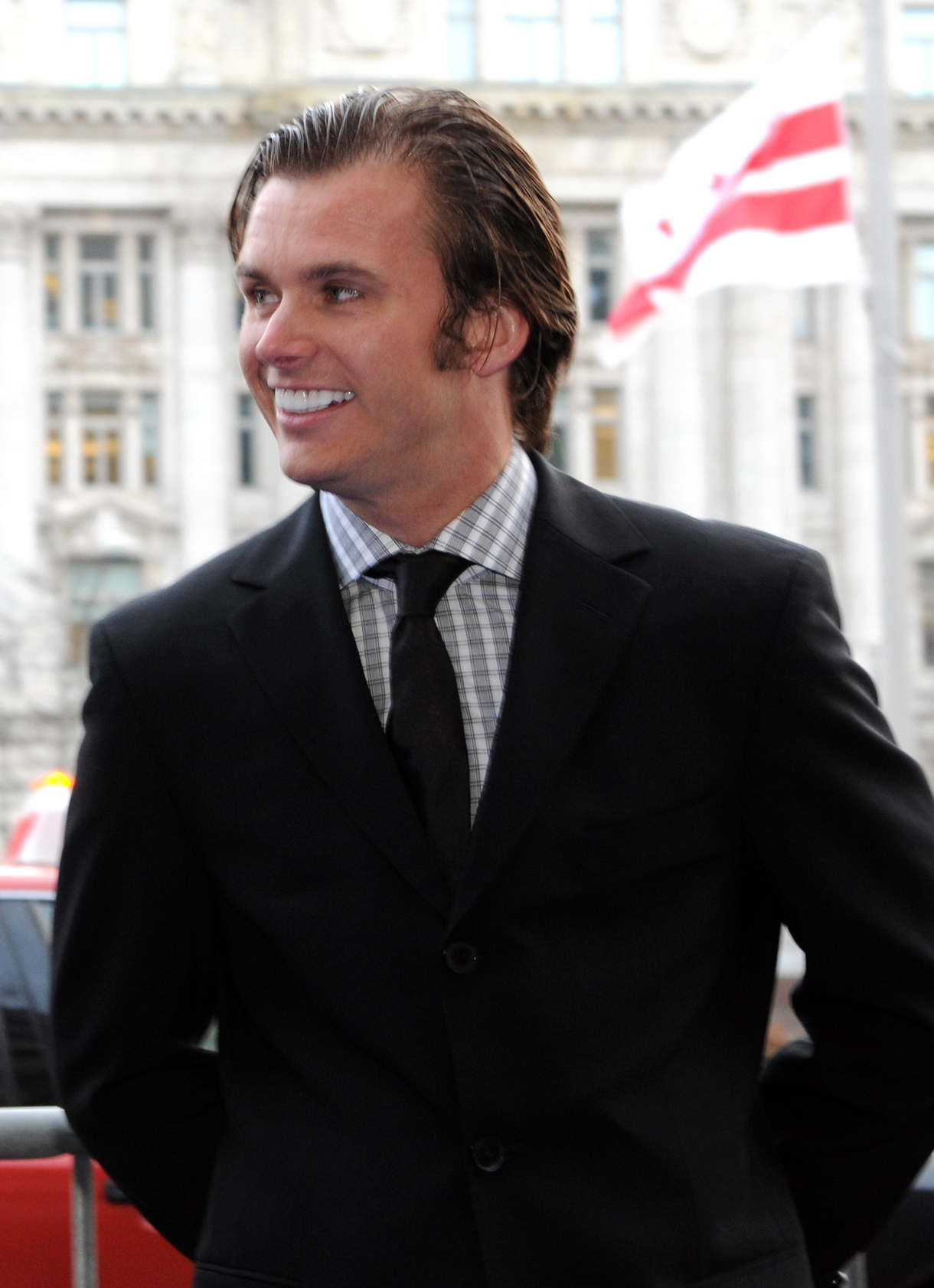
Dan Wheldon

- 1 October
  - David Bedford, composer (b. 1937)
  - Georgina Cookson, actress (b. 1918)
- 5 October
  - Graham Dilley, cricketer (b. 1959)
  - Bert Jansch, guitarist (b. 1943)
- 6 October
  - Alasdair Turner, computer scientist (b. 1969)
  - Phil Walker, newspaper editor (b. 1944)
- 7 October
  - George Baker, Bulgarian-born actor (b. 1931)
  - Frederick Cardozo, World War II soldier (b. 1916)
  - David Macey, translator and historian (b. 1949)
- 8 October – Dorothy Heathcote, academic (b. 1926)
- 9 October – Mark Kingston, actor (b. 1934)
- 11 October
  - Adrian Cowell, film maker (b. 1934)
  - Derrick Ward, footballer (b. 1934)
- 12 October – Peter Hammond, actor (b. 1923)
- 13 October – Sheila Allen, actress (b. 1932)
- 14 October – Adam Hunter, golfer (b. 1963)
- 15 October – Betty Driver, actress (b. 1920)
- 16 October
  - Henry Bathurst, 8th Earl Bathurst, peer and politician (b. 1927)
  - Antony Gardner, politician (b. 1927)
  - Stanley Mitchell, translator (b. 1932)
  - Caerwyn Roderick, politician (b. 1932)
  - Dan Wheldon, racing driver (accident) (b. 1978)
- 18 October
  - Bob Brunning, blues musician (b. 1943)
  - Donald McCallum, industrialist (b. 1922)
- 20 October
  - Sue Lloyd, actress (b. 1939)
  - Peter Taylor, botanist (b. 1926)
- 21 October
  - George Daniels, horologist (b. 1926)
  - Digby Jacks, trade unionist (b. 1945)
  - Edmundo Ros, Trinidadian-born singer, musician and bandleader (b. 1910)
- 23 October – John Makin, singer (b. 1950)
- 24 October – Alan Morgan, Anglican prelate (b. 1940)
- 25 October
  - Shirley Becke, police officer, first woman police commander in Britain (b. 1917)
  - Bernard Verdcourt, botanist (b. 1925)
  - Norrie Woodhall, actress (b. 1905)
- 28 October
  - Campbell Christie, former general secretary of the Scottish Trades Union Congress (b. 1937)
  - Beryl Davis, big band singer and actress (b. 1924)
- 29 October – Sir Jimmy Savile, DJ and television presenter (b. 1926)
- 30 October – Cyril Parfitt, artist (b. 1914)
- 31 October – Mick Anglo, comic book writer and artist, creator of Marvelman (b. 1916)

=== November ===
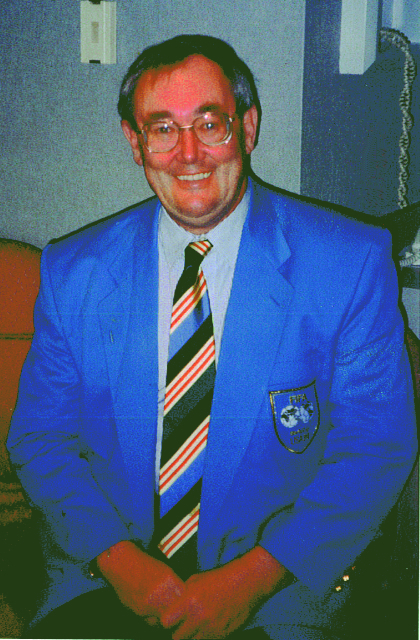
Alun Evans

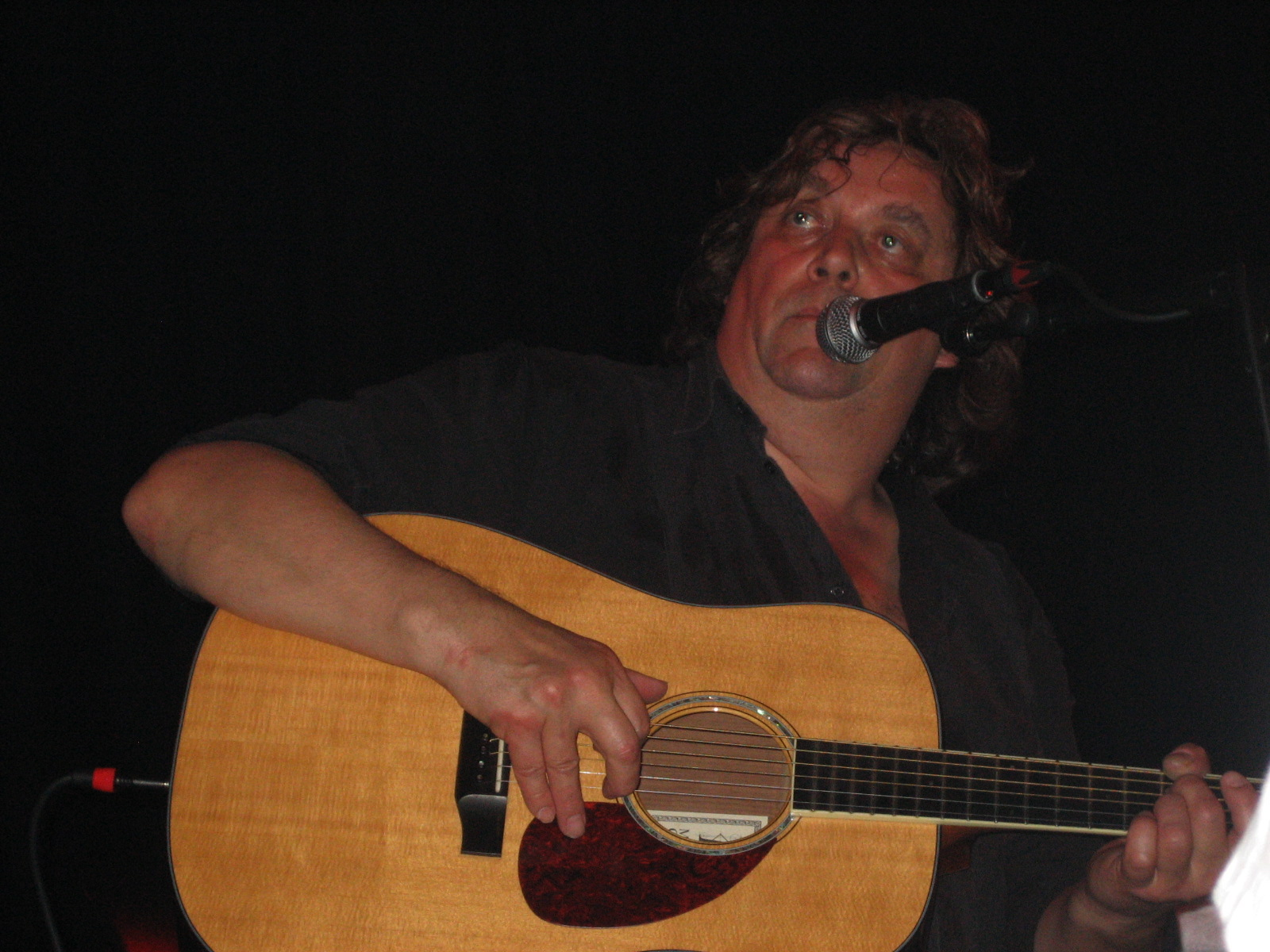
Jackie Leven

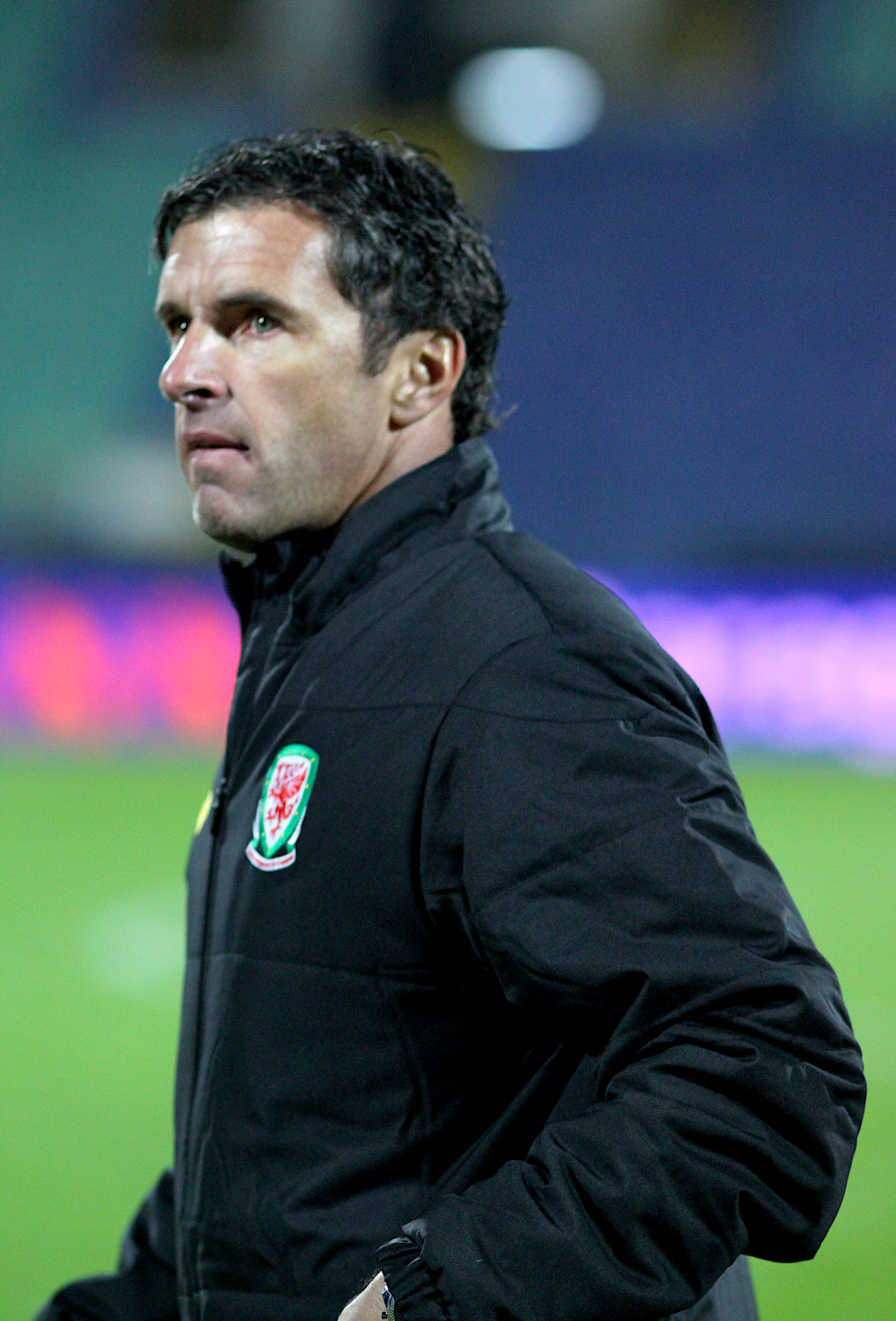
Gary Speed

- 1 November – Richard Gordon, horror film producer (b. 1925)
- 3 November
  - Timothy Raison, politician (b. 1929)
  - John Young, politician (b. 1930)
- 5 November – Sir Gordon Higginson, academic and engineer (b. 1929)
- 6 November
  - Gordon Beck, jazz pianist and composer (b. 1935)
  - Philip Gould, Baron Gould of Brookwood, politician (b. 1950)
- 8 November
  - Jimmy Adamson, footballer (b. 1929)
  - Sean Cunningham, RAF flight lieutenant and Red Arrows pilot (b. 1976)
  - Katherine Grant, 12th Countess of Dysart, peer (b. 1918)
  - Sir David Jack, pharmacologist (b. 1924)
- 9 November
  - Wilfred G. Lambert, archaeologist (b. 1926)
  - Sir Robin Mountfield, civil servant (b. 1939)
- 10 November – Alan Keen, politician, Labour MP for Feltham and Heston (since 1992) (b. 1937)
- 11 November – Michael Garrick, jazz pianist and composer (b. 1933)
- 12 November – Alun Evans, football administrator (b. 1942)
- 14 November
  - Richard Douthwaite, economist and ecologist (b. 1942)
  - Neil Heywood, businessman (murdered in Hong Kong) (b. 1970)
  - Jackie Leven, musician (b. 1950)
- 15 November
  - Dulcie Gray, Malaysian-born actress (b. 1915)
  - John Hart, teacher, first male winner of Mastermind (b. 1936)
- 16 November – Maureen Swanson, actress (b. 1932)
- 17 November – Peter Reading, poet (b. 1946)
- 18 November
  - Mark Blaug, Dutch-born economist (b. 1927)
  - David Langdon, cartoonist (b. 1914)
- 19 November
  - Basil D'Oliveira, South African-born cricketer (b. 1931)
  - John Neville, British-born actor (b. 1925)
- 20 November
  - Shelagh Delaney, writer (b. 1939)
  - Malcolm Mackintosh, civil servant (b. 1921)
- 21 November
  - Syd Cain, film production designer (b. 1918)
  - Jim Lewis, Olympic footballer (b. 1927)
- 23 November
  - Sir Peter Buchanan, admiral and Naval Secretary (b. 1925)
  - Gerald Laing, pop artist and sculptor (b. 1936)
- 24 November
  - Ross McManus, musician (b. 1927)
  - David Seely, 4th Baron Mottistone, peer (b. 1920)
  - Johnny Williams, footballer (b. 1935)
- 25 November – Hugh Burnett, television producer (b. 1924)
- 26 November
  - Keef Hartley, drummer and bandleader (b. 1944)
  - Patrick Mollison, haematologist (b. 1914)
- 27 November
  - Gary Speed, footballer and manager (b. 1969)
  - Ken Russell, film director (b. 1927)
- 28 November – Jon Driver, neuroscientist (b. 1962)
- 30 November – Peter Lunn, Alpine skier and spymaster (b. 1914)

=== December ===
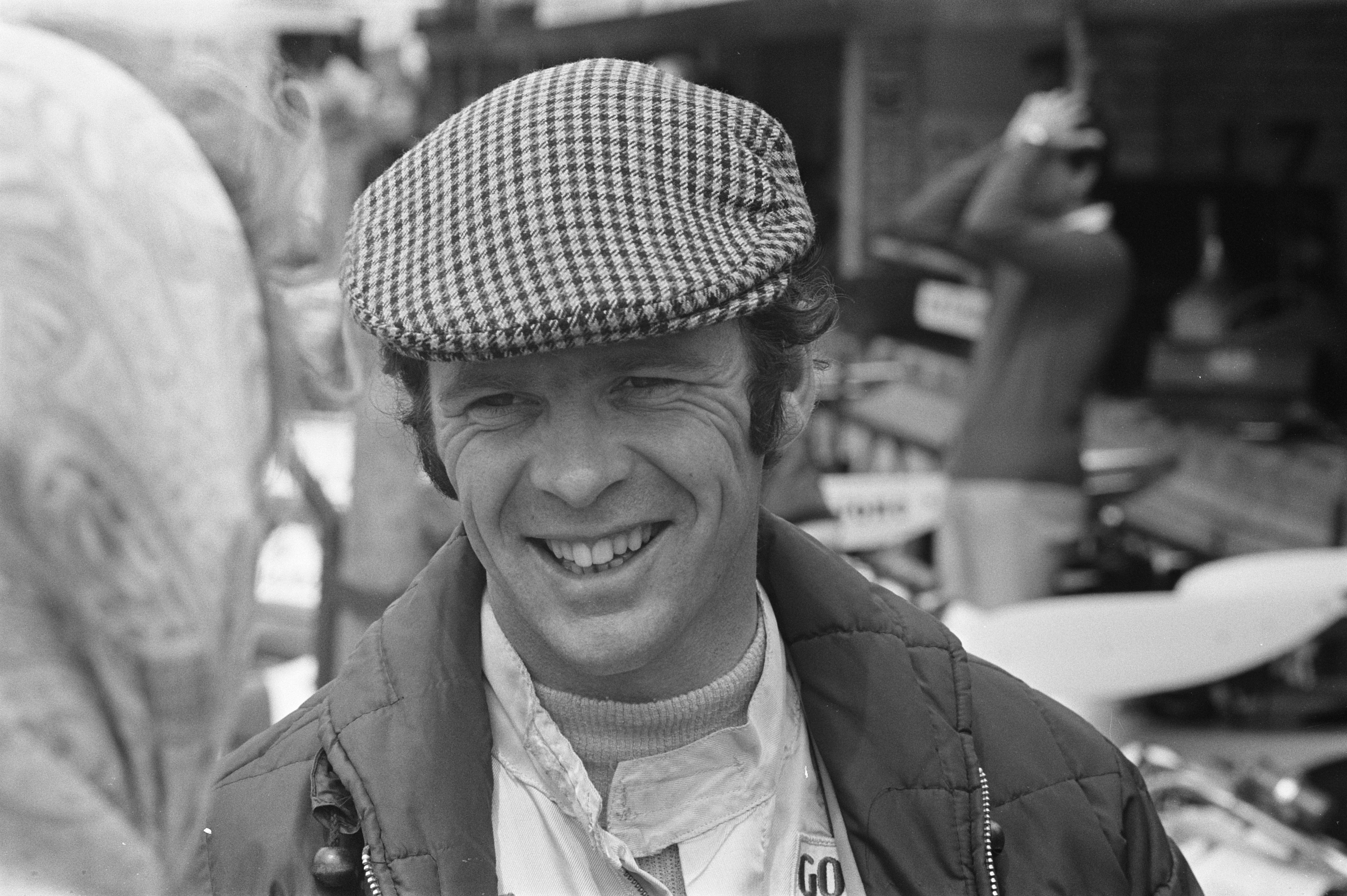
Peter Gethin

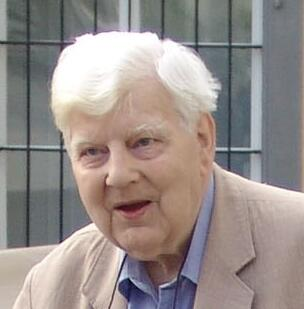
Sir Michael Dummett

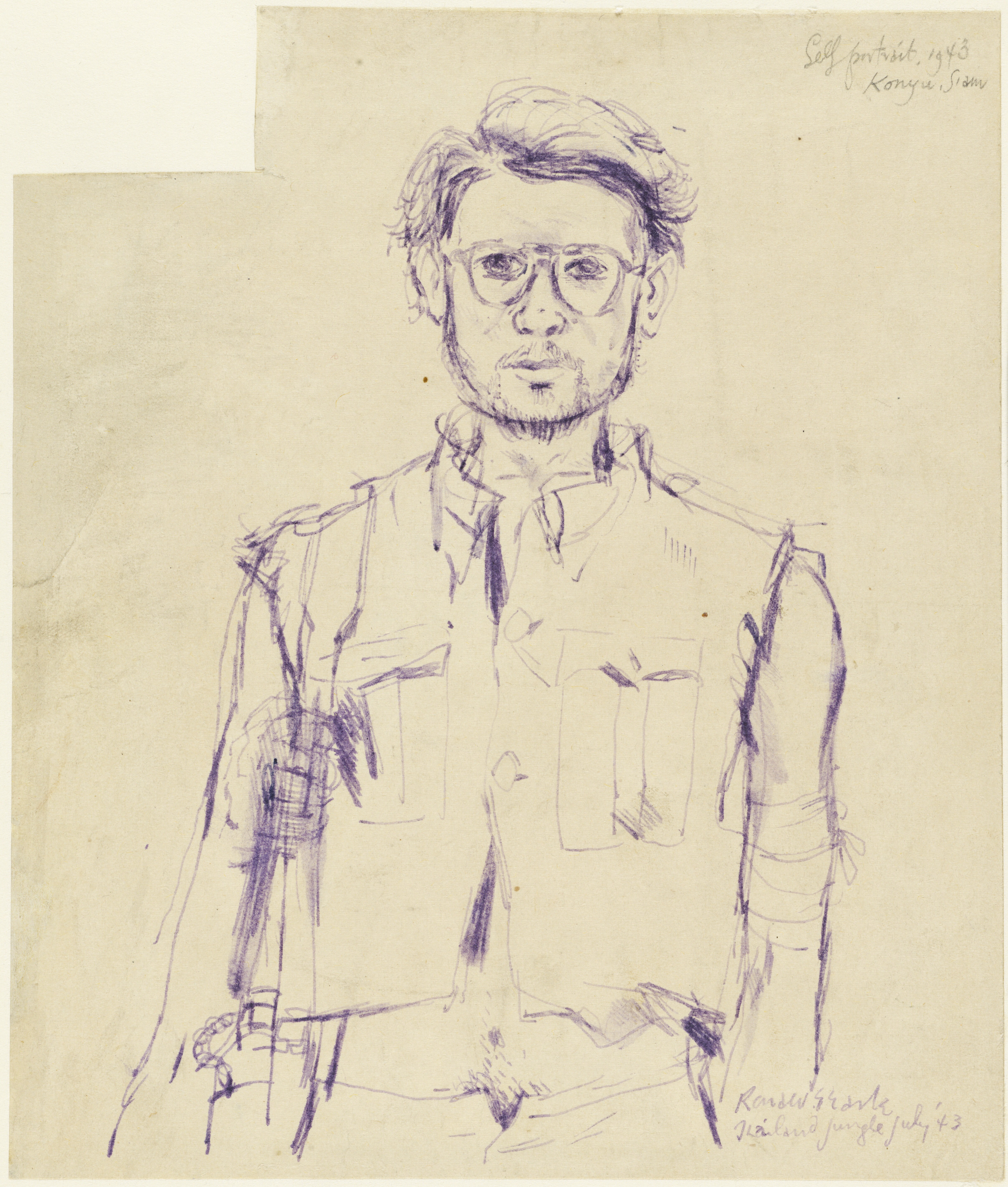
Ronald Searle (self-portrait)

- 1 December – Eric Arnott, eye surgeon (b. 1929)
- 2 December – Christopher Logue, poet (b. 1926)
- 3 December – Dev Anand, Indian-born actor (b. 1923)
- 4 December – Allan Cameron, soldier and curler (b. 1917)
- 5 December
  - Peter Gethin, racing driver (b. 1940)
  - Celia Whitelaw, Viscountess Whitelaw, philanthropist and horticulturalist (b. 1917)
- 7 December – Peter Croker, footballer (b. 1921)
- 8 December
  - Gilbert Adair, author (b. 1944)
  - Peter Brown, footballer (b. 1934)
  - Anthony Harbord-Hamond, 11th Baron Suffield, peer, soldier and politician (b. 1922)
- 9 December – Roy Tattersall, cricketer (b. 1922)
- 12 December – John Gardner, composer (b. 1917)
- 14 December
  - Graham Booth, politician (b. 1940)
  - Don Sharp, Australian-born film director (b. 1921)
- 15 December – Christopher Hitchens, author and journalist (b. 1949)
- 16 December
  - Henry Kitchener, 3rd Earl Kitchener, soldier and peer, last holder of the title (b. 1919)
  - Nicol Williamson, actor and singer (b. 1936)
- 17 December – Charles Chester, rugby player (b. 1919)
- 18 December
  - Donald Neilson, convicted burglar, robber, kidnapper and serial killer (b. 1936)
  - John Rex, South African-born sociologist (b. 1925)
  - Ronald Wolfe, scriptwriter (b. 1922)
- 20 December – Hugh Carless, diplomat and explorer (b. 1925)
- 21 December – Robert Simons, cricketer (b. 1922)
- 25 December
  - Sue Carroll, columnist (b. 1953)
  - Sir Roger Jowell, social statistician (b. 1942)
  - George Robb, footballer (b. 1926)
- 26 December – John Mackintosh Howie, mathematician (b. 1936)
- 27 December
  - Sir Michael Dummett, philosopher (b. 1925)
  - Sir Iwan Raikes, admiral and Naval Secretary (b. 1921)
- 29 December – Ron Howells, footballer (b. 1927)
- 30 December
  - Sir Robert Horton, businessman (b. 1939)
  - Ronald Searle, artist and cartoonist (b. 1920)
- 31 December
  - Sir David Hirst, jurist (b. 1925)
  - Penny Jordan, romantic novelist (b. 1946)
  - Michael Mann, Anglican prelate, Dean of Windsor (1976–1989) (b. 1924)

== See also ==
- 2011 in British music
- 2011 in British television
- List of British films of 2011
