= Val ffrench Blake =

British Army officer and animal breeder (1913–2011)

- Born: Robert Lifford Valentine ffrench Blake; 3 March 1913; Rawalpindi, India
- Died: 11 March 2011 (aged 98)
- Education: Eton College; Royal Military College, Sandhurst; Staff College, Camberley
- Occupations: British Army officer; cattle and horse breeder; author
- Known for: Dressage writing; military service
- Spouse: Grania Bryde Curran
- Children: 2

Robert Lifford Valentine ffrench Blake (3 March 1913 – 11 March 2011) was a lieutenant-colonel in the British Army, cattle and horse breeder, and author.

== Biography ==
=== Early life ===
Robert Lifford Valentine ffrench Blake was born on 3 March 1913 in Rawalpindi, India. He was a descendant of the Tribes of Galway. His father was Major St. John Lucius O'Brien Acheson ffrench Blake, who was killed at the First Battle of Gaza, and his mother, Doris Kathleen Tweedie. He went to Eton College, a boarding-school in Eton, Berkshire, where he was an Oppidan Scholar, and graduated from the Royal Military College, Sandhurst.

=== Military career ===
During the Second World War, he served with the 17th/21st Lancers in India and North Africa. However, after he was shot in the neck and arms by a sniper in November 1942, he was sent back to England to heal. He then worked at RAC Tactical School in Oxford and studied at the Staff College, Camberley. At the age of thirty-two, he was appointed assistant adjutant and quartermaster general (AA&QMG) to the 6th Armoured Division. He was then posted to the newly established Royal Military Academy Sandhurst, where he served as Chief Instructor of Old College and co-wrote the Military Syllabus for an 18-month course. Meanwhile, he became a Companion of the Distinguished Service Order in 1945. However, in 1949, he retired from the British Army as Lieutenant-Colonel.

=== Country life ===
Later, he moved to a farm in Cornwall, where he raised Ayrshire cattle. After being introduced to dressage by Polish cavalryman Captain Stefan Skupinski, he bred horses to sell them for eventing, showjumping and dressage. He also wrote several books, including: one about dressage, another one about the Crimean War, and a memoir. He taught children how to shoot woodcock, snipe or pheasant. He also became a professional painting restorer, copying Old Master.

In 2010, he asked his publisher to give him the royalties he was overdue from the sales of his 1972 book Dressage for Beginners in the United States.

=== Personal life ===
He married Grania Bryde Curran. They had two sons: Neil St. John ffrench Blake (born 1940) and Anthony O'Brien ffrench Blake (born 1942). They resided at Midgham Park Farm in Woolhampton, Berkshire. He spent his last years in a nursing home in Nether Wallop, Hampshire.

== Bibliography ==
- Dressage for Beginners (Boston, Massachusetts: Houghton Mifflin Harcourt, 1972).
- The Early Training of the Horse (Seeley, 1978).
- Elementary Dressage (Frederick Warne Publishers, 1984).
- The Crimean War (Barnsley, South Yorkshire: Pen and Sword Books, 2006).
- Mainstay of the Altos: A Twentieth Century Life (London: Bene Factum Publishing, 2011).
