= Leonard Webb (veteran) =

British Army soldier

Leonard James Webb
- Born: 16 April 1921; Cologne, Germany
- Died: 19 March 2011 (aged 89)
- Military career
- Allegiance: United Kingdom
- Branch: Army Service Corps
- Service years: 1941–1946
- Rank: Driver
- Conflicts: World War II
- Other work: Mayor of Thame (1975–79)

Leonard James Webb (16 April 1921 – 19 March 2011) was a British World War II veteran who was present at the liberation of Bergen-Belsen concentration camp in 1945.

== Biography ==
=== Early life ===
Webb was born in 1921, the second son of William and Lillian Webb, in Cologne, Germany where his father was serving as Regimental Quartermaster Sergeant in the then 14th King's Hussars while on duty in the occupation of the Rhine. In 1924 his father's regiment moved back to Tidworth Camp, Wiltshire until he was demobbed in 1927, and the Webb family moved to William Webb's native Long Crendon, Buckinghamshire.

Leonard Webb attended Long Crendon County School until the age of 14 with the idea of trying for a place as a pilot in the RAF. Unfortunately he failed the exam for an RAF apprenticeship, at RAF Halton in Aylesbury, being offered a place as a boy entrant instead which he accepted but was rejected later due to colour blindness.

=== World War II ===
Webb joined the army on 17 April 1941, the day after his 20th birthday, he reported to Bulford Barracks where he underwent 4 months of drilling and square bashing he was posted to a holding company, later to pass his driving test and become T262475 Driver Webb.

As the driver to Brigadier Glyn Hughes the deputy director of Medical Services for the British Second Army, who was in charge of relief operations in Bergen-Belsen, Webb witnessed some of the horrors for which the Holocaust is remembered. The relief work he and his staff faced was a monumental task of feeding tens of thousands of former prisoners, reducing the mortality rate and preventing the spread of infectious diseases. Burying the bodies became an overwhelming task. The British forced SS guards to remove and inter the corpses in mass graves, but soon bulldozers were used to complete the task.

=== Post World War II ===
Later on in life, he was also the mayor of Thame from 1975 to 1979. In December 1999 he was made the first Honorary Citizen of Thame, in recognition of his long, exemplary and outstanding public service to the people of Thame, both as a citizen and a councillor.

=== Medals ===
- 1939–1945 Star
- France and Germany Star
- 1939–45: Defence Medal
- War Medal 1939–1945

== Career ==
- Serving from 1969 to 1995 as a Thame Councillor
- Serving from 1977 to 1991 as a Thame District Councillor
- Mayor of Thame from 1975 to 1979; deputy mayor on two occasions
- School Governor of John Hampden school in 1969, serving for 26 years, including as chairman from 1975 to 1990
- Becoming a trustee of The Thame Barns Centre - 1990
- Chairman of The Friends of Meadowcroft - 2000
- Chairing the Thame Golden Jubilee Festival Organising committee - 2002
