= Alun Evans (FAW) =

Welsh football chairman (1942–2011)

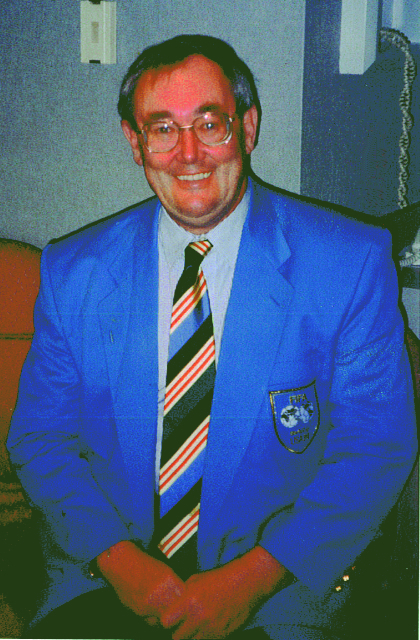
- Born: 11 June 1942; Porth, Glamorgan, Wales, UK
- Died: 12 November 2011 (aged 69); Cardiff, Wales, UK
- Other name: Alun E. Evans
- Occupation: Former Chief Executive Officer Football Association of Wales

Alun E. Evans (11 June 1942 – 12 November 2011) was general secretary of the Football Association of Wales between 1982 and 1995 and club secretary of Welsh League side, UWIC FC.

== Profile ==
Evans obtained two bachelor's degrees in economics and geography from the University of London followed by his teaching qualification at Pembroke College, Oxford. He taught economics and geography in independent schools in London and Lancashire for seven years before entering sports administration as Secretary of the Universities Athletic Union, where he organised the National Universities Championships in 27 sports.

He was then appointed Secretary and Chief Executive of the Football Association of Wales from 1982 to 1995 (first elected to the FA of Wales Council in 1988), during which time he founded the League of Wales (now the Welsh Premier) in 1992 after countless efforts on national and international stages. Evans retained his interest in student sport, serving as an officer on its national organisations and was co-founder of the British Universities Sports Association (BUSA) in 1994. After several years of professional experience, he returned to academic study, taking a master's degree (with distinction) in sports history and culture (M.A. Thesis, De Montfort University, 1996: Football on the Edge: The Relationship between Welsh Football Policy-Making and the British International Championship).

== Affiliations ==
Evans was part of the Academic School of Sports at the Buckinghamshire New University, his professional interests being Sport and national Identity; Bidding and hosting international events; and The Governance of Sport. He also serves as BUSA's Disciplinary Panel Chair. He was also Technical Delegate for Football for the European Universities Sports Association.
