= Raymond Challinor =

British historian (1929–2011)

Raymond Corrick "Ray" Challinor (9 July 1929 – 30 January 2011) was a Marxist historian of the British labour movement.

== Early life and education ==
Challinor was born in Stoke-on-Trent, Staffordshire. Both of his parents were political activists, his father was secretary of his branch of the Labour Party, and his mother was a member of the Independent Labour Party (ILP). Both of his parents had also left their Methodist roots and were agnostic. He became a voracious reader and collector of books and pamphlets in his youth. Challinor said that the daily diet in the Challinor household was "politics, for breakfast, dinner and supper." His parents separated when he was 11 and he was sent to live with his aunt.

Challinor attended Crewe Grammar School until his parents' separation, and was then sent off to board at the George Fox Quaker School in Lancaster. Pupils were actually encouraged to take part in local politics and in 1941 he became involved in the Lancaster by-election, supporting the Independent Labour Party candidate Fenner Brockway. Challinor's first political allegiance was to the ILP, and in 1946, at the age of 18, Challinor became attracted to the Revolutionary Communist Party (RCP), a group within the ILP. During his National Service, Challinor registered as a conscientious objector and so worked the land instead of joining the military.

== Early political activity ==
Challinor moved back to Stoke-on-Trent and worked on a local newspaper. During this period, the RCP fractured three ways, and Challinor joined the group under Tony Cliff named the Socialist Review Group. Later, this became the International Socialists (IS), and from the 1970s it was the Socialist Workers Party (SWP). He also struck up a friendship with Stan Newens, later a Labour MP, who had chosen the Staffordshire pits for his National Service. As a young activist, Challinor had formed the opinion that the Soviet Union was not a workers' state. At the age of 18, he wrote that "it is criminal to call Russia Socialist. This harms not only the cause of the Russian worker but also that of Revolutionary Socialism. The only thing to do is to tell the truth about Russia and to show it has nothing in common with Socialism."

After the formation of the Socialist Review Group, Challinor became a member of the editorial committee of a new newspaper, Socialist Review. In 1952, he started a four-year degree at the University College of North Staffordshire at Keele. He became involved with the Campaign for Nuclear Disarmament (CND) and the Committee of 100, attending the first Aldermaston March in 1958. He was briefly a local councillor for the Labour Party, and was selected then deselected as a parliamentary candidate for Nantwich, his anti-Labour writings too much for the party headquarters.

== Personal life ==
In 1952, Challinor met Mabel Brough in the Labour League of Youth. They married in 1957, and had one son, Russell, born in 1962.

== Selected works/articles ==
- Alexander MacDonald and the miners (1968)
- The Miners' Association: a trade union in the age of the Chartists / with Brian Ripley (1968)
- The Lancashire and Cheshire miners (1972)
- The Origins of British Bolshevism (1977)
- John S. Clarke: parliamentarian, poet and lion-tamer (1977)
- Working class politics in North East England (co-edited with Maureen Callcott)
- A Radical Lawyer in Victorian England. WP Roberts and the Struggle for Workers Rights (1990)
- A new harmony?: Robert Owen's visit to Newcastle in 1843 (1990)
- The struggle for hearts and minds : essays on the Second World War (1995)
- "Military Discipline and Working Class Resistance in World War II", in What Next? (2000)
- "The Red Mole of History", in Socialist Review (2001)
