= Sue Carroll =

British writer and columnist (1953–2011)

- Born: Susan Elizabeth Carroll; 6 December 1953; Gosforth, Newcastle upon Tyne, UK
- Died: 25 December 2011 (aged 58); London, UK
- Occupation: Columnist

Susan Elizabeth Carroll (6 December 1953 – 25 December 2011) was an English journalist, best known for her time as a columnist at the Daily Mirror.

== Career ==
Carroll was born in 1953 at Gosforth, Newcastle-upon-Tyne. After leaving Gosforth Grammar School she joined D. C. Thomson & Co. in Dundee, Scotland. Working on the weekly teenage girls magazine Jackie she assisted on its "Cathy and Claire" problem page and then moved on to write the magazines fashion and beauty features. Aged 20 she moved to London to work as features editor for Woman.

Employed for her ability to extract private information from celebrities in interviews, she moved to the News Of The World, where she was later involved in the launch of its Sunday magazine. Moving to sister paper The Sun as Women's editor and then as a features writer, she acted as a mentor to the assistant writer of the newspapers A-Z of Soaps column, Rebekah Wade.

Carroll joined the Daily Mirror in 1998, writing under the banner "Warm, witty and straight to the point... Britain's best columnist". Her first column began:

I smoke, I drink, I eat red meat by the pound and I don't like being told what to do by bullies.

Over time, her column featured her thoughts on society, values, popular culture and celebrity. She displayed a consistent ability to provoke, and in 2002 during supermodel Naomi Campbell's privacy case against the Daily Mirror, judge Mr Justice Morland described Carroll's reference to Campbell as a "chocolate soldier" as "extremely rude and offensive". She was described by Kevin Maguire, an associate editor at the Daily Mirror, as "the queen of columnists".

== Later life ==
Carroll was diagnosed as having pancreatic cancer in July 2010, writing a column in March 2011 she explained her condition. After undergoing a failed operation, she underwent chemotherapy treatment at the Royal Marsden Hospital.

In September 2010 she suffered a stroke, and after recovery two months later attended the Daily Mirror's Pride of Britain Awards, in a wheelchair pushed by comedian Paul O'Grady (a.k.a. Lily Savage).

She died at her London home on 25 December 2011, aged 58.
