= 2011 in Scotland =

- Centuries: 19th; 20th; 21st
- Decades: 1990s; 2000s; 2010s; 2020s
- See also: List of years in Scotland; Timeline of Scottish history 2011 in: The UK • England • Wales • Elsewhere; Scottish football: 2010–11 • 2011–12; 2011 in Scottish television

Events from the year 2011 in Scotland.

== Incumbents ==
- First Minister and Keeper of the Great Seal – Alex Salmond
- Secretary of State for Scotland – Michael Moore

=== Law officers ===
- Lord Advocate – Elish Angiolini; then Frank Mulholland
- Solicitor General for Scotland – Frank Mulholland; then Lesley Thomson
- Advocate General for Scotland – Lord Wallace of Tankerness

=== Judiciary ===
- Lord President of the Court of Session and Lord Justice General – Lord Hamilton
- Lord Justice Clerk – Lord Gill
- Chairman of the Scottish Land Court – Lord McGhie

== Events ==
=== January ===
- 1 January
  - The United Nations is to examine claims of ownership of the Scottish island of Rockall, after a request from Denmark, which has sovereignty over the neighbouring Faroes.
  - A soldier serving with the Argyll and Sutherland Highlanders is killed in an explosion near to the Nahr-e Saraj district of Helmand Province, in Afghanistan.
  - Approximately 140 people take part in the annual Loony Dook in the Firth of Forth, at South Queensferry.
- 2 January
  - At the Old Firm game, Rangers and Celtic, represented by John Greig and Billy McNeill respectively, pay their respects to the 66 victims of the 1971 Ibrox disaster.
  - The Montenegrin Embassy in London writes to Scottish Labour leader Iain Gray, correcting factual inaccuracies and asking him to explain comments he made during First Minister's Questions in December 2010, about the country being involved in "war crimes", "ethnic cleansing" and "a United Nations peace-keeping mission".
  - The publishers of the Sunday Herald newspaper announce that it is to be relaunched as a weekly news magazine.
- 3 January – Gary Anderson is the runner-up at the World Darts Championship.
- 5 January
  - The Rosyth – Zeebrugge ferry service, the country's only direct ro-ro ferry route to mainland Europe, re-opens as a freight-only service.
  - A rare Eurasian bittern (Botaurus stellaris), which last bred in the country c. 1830, is sighted at RSPB Scotland's Insh Marshes nature reserve in Strathspey.
- 18 January – The installation of replicas of the 37 Stirling Heads is completed at the King's Inner Hall at Stirling Castle.
- 23 January – An earthquake measuring 3.5 magnitude is recorded at Glenuig, 25 miles (40 km) west of Fort William.
- 25 January – Andy Gray is dismissed from Sky Sports for sexist comments.
- 26 January – Tommy Sheridan is sentenced to three years in prison for lying on oath during the Sheridan v News International case in 2006.
- 27 January – The Scotland Bill receives an unopposed second reading in the House of Commons, with the Secretary of State for Scotland Michael Moore describing the legislation as the largest transfer of fiscal powers from central Government since the creation of the United Kingdom.
- 27 January – A Tornado GR4 jet from RAF Lossiemouth ditches in Loch Ewe, with the 2 crew ejecting shortly before the crash.
- 29 January – A climber survives after falling 1000 feet from Sgurr Choinnich Mor, part of the Grey Corries range in Lochaber.

=== February ===
- 1 February – The University of the Highlands and Islands is granted full university status.
- 10 February – Former Labour MP Jim Devine is convicted of two counts of fraud for falsely claiming £8,385 in expenses. Devine is the first MP to stand trial in the United Kingdom parliamentary expenses scandal and is later sentenced to 16 months imprisonment.

=== March ===
- 27 March – 2011 United Kingdom Census is taken. The Scottish population stands at 5,295,403, the country's highest ever to this point. For the first time, a census question is asked about proficiency in the Scots language.

=== April ===
- 1 April – Prescription charges abolished in Scotland.

=== May ===
- 5 May – Elections are held for the Scottish Parliament together with the referendum on whether to adopt the Alternative Vote electoral system for elections to the House of Commons of the United Kingdom.
- 6 May
  - The Scottish National Party secures an historic landslide election victory, winning an overall majority in the Scottish Parliament election. This is the first time that any party has secured a majority since devolution was established in 1999.
  - Voters reject proposals to introduce the alternative voting system in the UK.
  - Scottish Labour Party leader Iain Gray announces his resignation after his party loses key seats in constituencies across Scotland.
- 7 May
  - The Scottish National Party urges UK Prime Minister David Cameron to amend the Scotland Bill to give the Scottish Parliament greater legislative powers.
  - Scottish Liberal Democrat leader Tavish Scott resigns after a collapse of his party's support at the Scottish Parliament election.
- 9 May – Scottish Conservative Party leader Annabel Goldie announces her intention to step down from the role after the Party's poor results at the recent Parliamentary election.

=== June ===
- 19 June – It is revealed that former Makar, Edwin Morgan, left the SNP almost £1,000,000 in his will.
- 21 June – Riverside Museum in Glasgow opened to the public.

=== July ===
- 1 July – The Labour Party's Iain McKenzie wins the Inverclyde by-election with a majority reduced from 14,416 in 2010 to 5,838.
- 27 July – Hacktivist Topiary (Jake Davis) is arrested on Yell, Shetland.

=== August ===
- 10 August – Police from Scotland are being sent to England to help combat riots and disorder.
- 31 August – Critics of the proposed £400,000,000 Aberdeen Bypass, who have already delayed the project since it won approval in December 2009, decide to press ahead with a fresh legal challenge after a recent appeal at the Court of Session was rejected.

=== September ===
- 7 September – Scottish First Minister Alex Salmond unveils a legislative programme for the coming year which includes plans to create a single police force and a single fire service for Scotland.
- 21 September – Finance Secretary John Swinney announces his spending plans for the next three years in the context of cuts of more than £3,000,000,000 in funding from the UK Government.

=== October ===
- 12 October – Insurance companies fail in a legal bid to scrap the right of people in Scotland to claim damages for an asbestos-related condition that had been legislated for by the Damages (Asbestos-related Conditions) (Scotland) Act 2009.
- 13 October – BP has been given the go-ahead to proceed with a new £4.5bn oil project west of the Shetland Islands.
- 19 October – Discovery of the Port an Eilean Mhòir boat burial, the UK mainland's first fully intact Viking ship burial site, at Ardnamurchan in the western Scottish Highlands, is announced.
- 20 October – A BBC Scotland investigation claims to have uncovered evidence of alleged criminality in the past business dealings of the new owner of Rangers FC, Craig Whyte.
- 25 October – Scottish gun crime falls to 32-year low.
- 26 October – Labour MP Ian Davidson, chairman of the Scottish Affairs Select Committee apologises for 'any offence that might have been caused' after SNP MP Dr Eilidh Whiteford accused him of threatening that she would get "a doing" if discussions from a behind-closed-doors meeting of the committee were leaked to the media.
- 27 October – Edinburgh City Council vote to proceed with plans for a Gaelic school in the city.

=== November ===
- 4 November – Newly elected MSP Ruth Davidson is announced as the new Leader of the Scottish Conservatives.
- 6 November – A public opinion poll carried out for the BBC Politics Show indicates that devo-max was the most popular option with Scottish voters: 33% backed devo-max, 28% supported Scottish independence and 29% backed 'no further constitutional change'.
- 10 November – Alex Salmond wins the Herald's Scottish Politician of the Year award.
- 17 November – Alex Salmond is named The Spectator magazine's 2011 politician of the year.
- 21 November
  - Stena Line ro-pax ferry MS Stena Caledonia makes the operator's final entry into the port of Stranraer on passage from Belfast. Her replacement, MS Stena Superfast VIII, makes the first sailing from Loch Ryan Port, Old House Point, Cairnryan.
  - A pair of Euro Lottery winners donate £1m to the SNP independence campaign.
- 30 November – Up to 300,000 public sector workers strike in Scotland over planned UK pension and job changes.

=== December ===
- 4 December – Two giant pandas arrive in Edinburgh from China.
- 8 December – Police tell people not to travel as winds of up to 165 mph (264 km/h) affect the country.
- 14 December – New laws to tackle religious hatred and bigotry related to football are passed by the Scottish Parliament.
- 17 December – MSP Johann Lamont is elected as the new Scottish Labour leader and becomes the Leader of the Opposition.
- 22 December – For the first time, the Scottish Parliament votes to reject a Legislative Consent Motion, refusing to allow Westminster to apply parts of the Welfare Reform Bill to Scotland.

=== Undated ===
- Amazon's largest UK distribution centre opens in Dunfermline.

== Deaths ==
- 4 January – Gerry Rafferty (born 1947), singer-songwriter
- 11 January – Kenneth Stevenson (born 1949), Bishop of Portsmouth
- 22 January – Chandos Blair (born 1919) General Officer Commanding Scotland (1972–76)
- 24 January – Alec Boden (born 1925), footballer
- 24 January – Phil Gallie (born 1939), Conservative & Unionist MP and MSP
- 30 January – Ian R. Porteous (born 1930), mathematician
- 1 February – Len Fyfe (born 1941), Labour peer
- 1 February – Tom Jarvie (born 1916), footballer, veterinary surgeon and television personality
- 1 February – Derek Rawcliffe (born 1921), Bishop of Glasgow and Galloway (1981–1991)
- 10 February – Lynne Walker (born 1956), music and theatre critic
- 12 February – James Elliott (born 1928), theatre and television actor
- 21 February – Anne Mathams (born 1913), educationist and disability rights activist
- 22 February – Brian Bonsor (born 1926), composer and music teacher
- 10 March – Danny Paton (born 1936), footballer, who played for Heart Of Midlothian and Oxford United
- 11 March – David Brown (born 1941), international cricketer
- 13 March – Roy Flatt (born 1947), Dean of Argyll and the Isles (1999–2005)
- 31 March – Ishbel MacAskill (born 1941), singer
- 6 April – Jim Blair (born 1947), footballer
- 10 April – Jimmy Briggs (born 1937), footballer
- 11 April – Doug Newlands (born 1931), footballer
- 12 April – Ronnie Coyle (born 1964), footballer
- 20 April – Allan Brown (born 1926), football player and manager
- 28 April – Willie O'Neill (born 1940), footballer
- 30 April – Eddie Turnbull (born 1923), football player and manager
- 5 May – Tommy Wright (born 1928), footballer
- 7 May – Dougie McCracken (born 1964), footballer
- 9 May – David Cairns (born 1966), Labour MP
- 12 May – Noreen Murray (born 1935), professor of molecular genetics at the University of Edinburgh
- 14 May – Ernie Walker (born 1928), Scottish Football Association administrator
- 21 May – Gordon McLennan (born 1924), General Secretary of the Communist Party of Great Britain (1975–1990)
- 27 May – Janet Brown (born 1923), actress, comedian and impressionist
- 8 June – John Mackenzie (born 1928), film director
- 23 June – Ronnie McCluskey (born 1936), footballer
- 26 June – Alan Rodger, Baron Rodger of Earlsferry, Justice of the Supreme Court of the United Kingdom
- 9 August – George Scott Wallace (born 1929), British Columbia physician and politician
- 23 November – Gerald Laing (born 1936 in England), pop artist and sculptor
- 5 December – Celia Whitelaw, Viscountess Whitelaw (born 1917), philanthropist

== The arts ==
- c.19 January – Liz Lochhead becomes the second Scots Makar, the official national poet of Scotland
- 1 September – Royal Scottish Academy of Music and Drama in Glasgow renamed as the Royal Conservatoire of Scotland
- September – Glasgow synth-pop band CHVRCHΞS is formed
- Kevin MacNeil's novel A Method Actor's Guide to Jekyll and Hyde is published

== See also ==
- Timeline of Scottish history
- 2011 in England
- 2011 in Northern Ireland
- 2011 in the United Kingdom
- 2011 in Wales
