= 2011 in Wales =

- Centuries: 19th; 20th; 21st
- Decades: 1990s; 2000s; 2010s; 2020s
- See also: List of years in Wales; Timeline of Welsh history 2011 in The United Kingdom England Scotland Elsewhere Welsh football: 2010–11 • 2011–12

This article is about the particular significance of the year 2011 to Wales and its people.

== Incumbents ==
- First Minister – Carwyn Jones
- Secretary of State for Wales – Cheryl Gillan
- Archbishop of Wales – Barry Morgan, Bishop of Llandaff
- Archdruid of the National Eisteddfod of Wales – Jim Parc Nest

== Events ==
- 1 January – Welsh recipients of New Year Honours include Raymond Rees (MBE), for his role in preserving the tradition of coracle fishing; Tom Davies (OBE), commissioner of the Independent Police Complaints Commission in Wales; Peter Walker, former Glamorgan cricketer (MBE); educator Dr Dennis Gunning (CBE); and Gareth Vaughan, president of the Farmers’ Union of Wales (MBE). Professor Eldryd Parry is made a KCMG for his services to medicine.
- 5 January – John Warman, a veteran Liberal Democrat councillor in Neath, defects to the Labour Party
- 21 January – The South Wales coastguard carry out their "first ever" rescue of a mudslide victim, at Rhossili in Gower.
- 2 February – A bronze bust of Ray Gravell by John Meirion Morris is unveiled at the BBC Cymru Wales HQ in Cardiff.
- 7 February – Wrexham council grant planning permission for the "Waking the Dragon" tower to be constructed near Chirk.
- 19 February – The first public passenger train operates between Caernarfon and Porthmadog Harbour over the restored Welsh Highland Railway.
- 24 February – Kate Middleton, accompanied by her fiancé Prince William of Wales, attends a lifeboat naming ceremony at Trearddur, Anglesey, her first public engagement in the principality.
- 3 March – Welsh devolution referendum: Of a 35.2% voting turnout, 63.49% vote 'yes', and 36.51% vote 'no' in response to the question "Do you want the Assembly now to be able to make laws on all matters in the 20 subject areas it has powers for?".
- 15 March – Local Government Minister Carl Sargeant confirms to the National Assembly that Anglesey Council will be taken over by independent commissioners as a result of infighting between councillors. Sargeant says that the councillors have "betrayed those who elected them" and indulged in "politics of the playground".

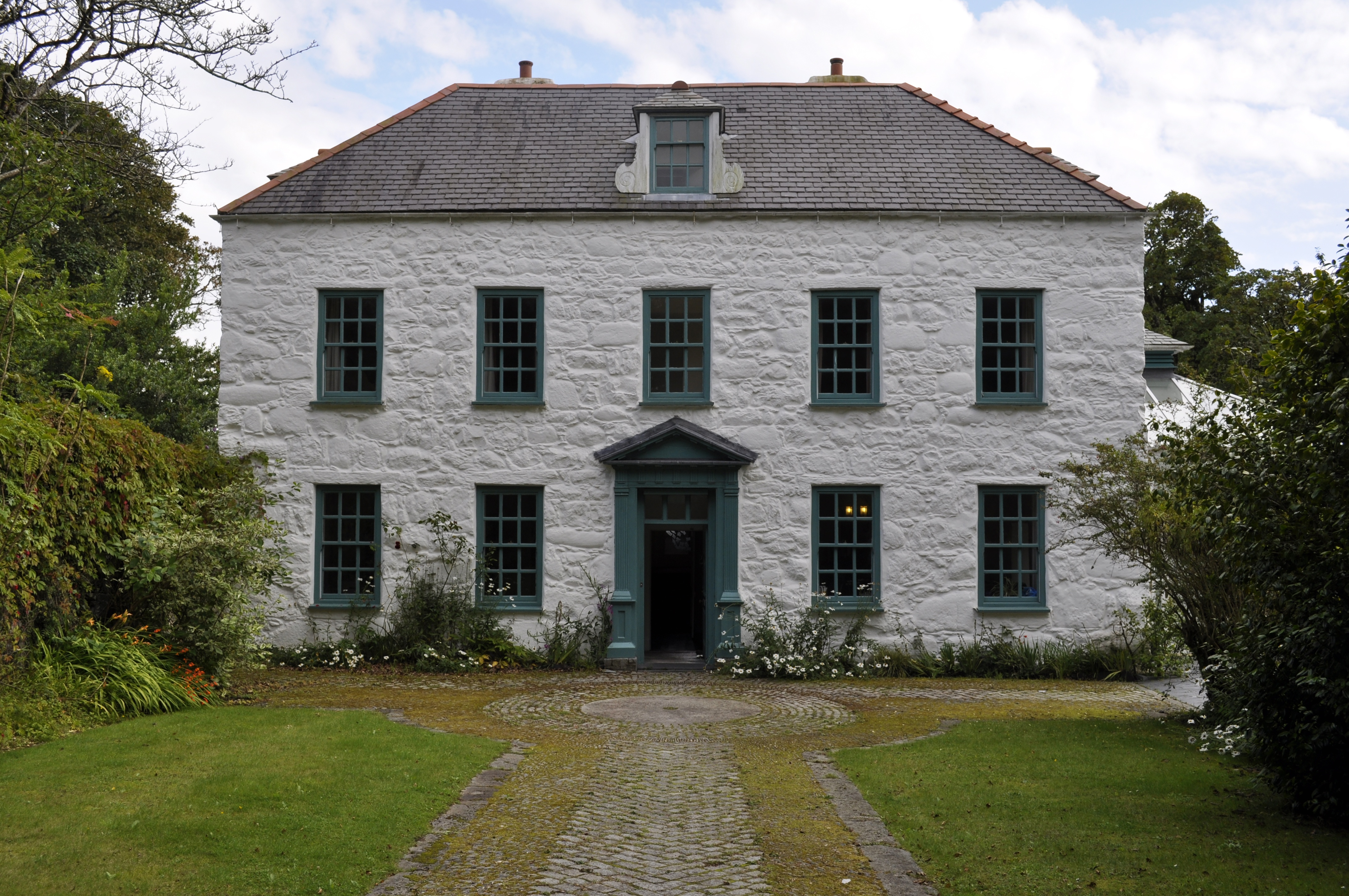
1 April: Tŷ Newydd

- 1 April
  - The Academi changes its title to Literature Wales, simultaneously merging with the writers' centre Tŷ Newydd.
  - Emergency contraception pills become available free on request in pharmacies throughout Wales.
  - Elizabeth II visits Anglesey to witness the daily activities of her grandson, Prince William of Wales. She arrives at RAF Valley in gale-force winds. The prince comments: “I really do love it here”.
- 20 April – Four people from Pontypridd are killed when their car plunges down an embankment and into the Clywedog reservoir.
- 29 April – The wedding of Prince William of Wales to Kate Middleton is conducted by Dr Rowan Williams. Welsh guests include Richard Meade and Martyn Williams; First Minister Carwyn Jones and the Assembly's Presiding Officer Dafydd Elis-Thomas are also present. The music played at the service includes Ubi Caritas et Amor, a choral arrangement specially commissioned for the occasion by the Welsh composer Paul Mealor, and the hymn "Love Divine, All Loves Excelling, sung to the tune "Blaenwern" by William Penfro Rowlands.
- 8 May – Social media sites name Ryan Giggs as the footballer involved in the CTB v News Group Newspapers legal case.
- 12 May – Carwyn Jones is formally appointed First minister of the newly renamed Welsh Government (formerly the Welsh Assembly Government), and his new Cabinet includes Lesley Griffiths, John Griffiths and Huw Lewis.
- 13 May – Following a decision made at its Bishops' Spring Conference, the Roman Catholic Church in England and Wales announces the reinstatement of the rule of abstaining from eating red meat on Fridays. The practice, last observed in 1984, will be reintroduced on 16 September to coincide with the first anniversary of the visit of Pope Benedict XVI.
- 17 May – Two newly elected Lib Dem AMs, Aled Roberts and John Dixon, are discovered to have been ineligible for election to the Assembly, because of their membership of other bodies.
- 2 June – Four oil refinery workers are killed in an explosion at Chevron's Pembroke Refinery at Rhoscrowther during maintenance of a 730 cubic metre storage tank.
- 25 June – Archdruid T. James Jones makes a controversial speech in which he claims that "Britishness" threatens Welsh identity, and suggests that Welsh Olympic medal-winners should be accompanied by the raising of the Welsh flag and the Welsh national anthem, rather than the British flag and anthem. Welsh Conservative MP David Davies says he is "talking rubbish" and that most Welsh people are proud to be both British and Welsh.
- 29 June – A court ruling restricting the powers of police bail has thrown thousands of cases in England and Wales into disarray.
- 9 July – National Museum of Art opens at the National Museum Cardiff.

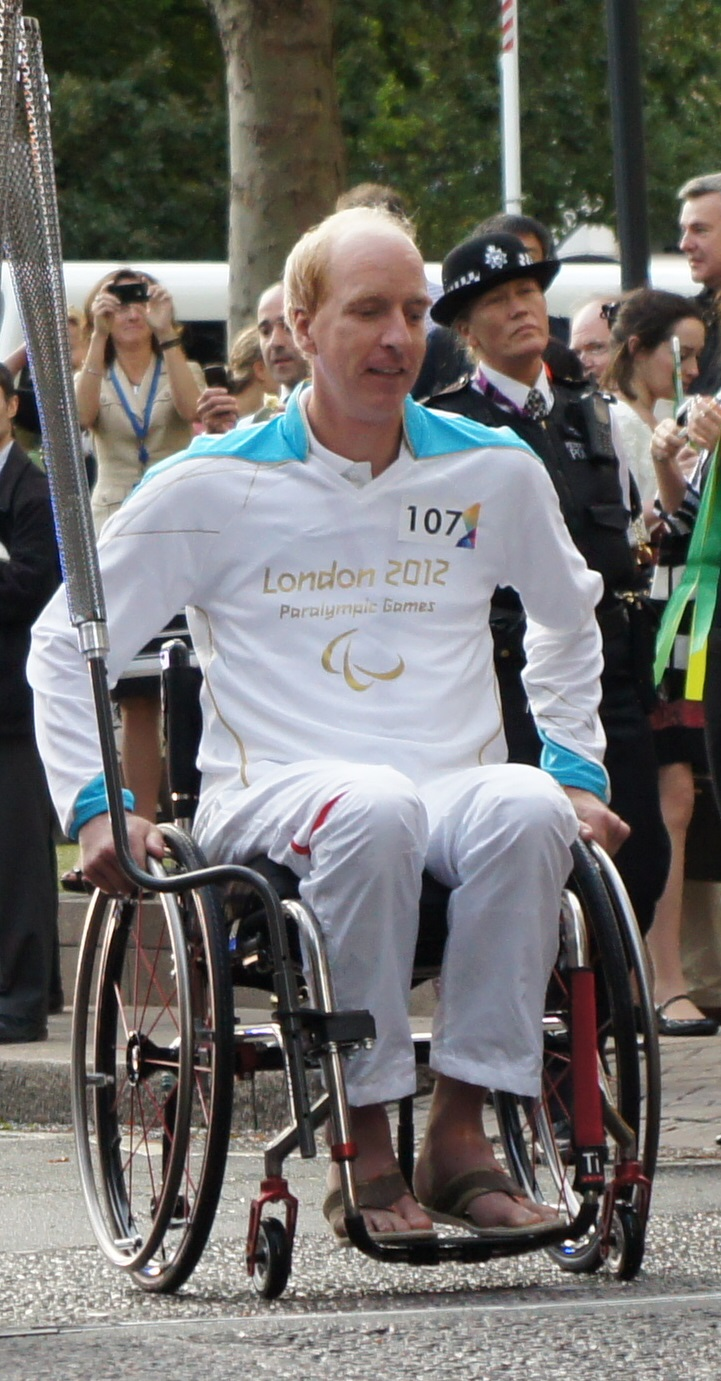
17 August: Simon Richardson

- 12 July – Police (Detention and Bail) Act 2011, affecting England and Wales, receives its Royal Assent.
- 17 August – Paralympic cyclist Simon Richardson MBE is seriously injured in a road accident near Cowbridge, ten years after a similar accident that left him disabled.
- 30 August – Racecourse owner Dai Walters warns that Ffos Las, the UK's newest racecourse, could be forced to close if plans to reduce the number of race meetings are carried through.
- 2 September – Welsh Food Festival is held at Glansevern Hall, Welshpool.
- 15 September – Gleision Colliery mining accident: An explosion at Gleision drift mine near Cilybebyll results in an all-night rescue operation to free four trapped miners but the following day their bodies are discovered by rescue workers.
- 1 October – Shops in Wales are obliged to charge for single-use paper and plastic carrier bags from today.
- 19 October – The manager of Gleision Colliery is arrested on suspicion of manslaughter; he is later released on police bail.
- 29 October – The revived Wrexham Lager brand is served in North Wales.
- 31 October – A landslide at Porthkerry leaves several static holiday caravans overhanging the edge of a cliff.
- 27 November – Prince William, Duke of Cambridge, is involved in the rescue of two Russian seamen by RAF helicopter, after the ore carrier Swanland sinks off the North Wales coast. Five more crew members are drowned.
- 28 November – The judge in the trial of eight former South Wales Police officers accused of perverting the course of justice in the 1988 Lynette White murder case requests a review of evidence. It is discovered that some files are missing, and the case against the defendants collapses as a result.
- 30 November – About 170,000 workers in Wales begin a strike as part of UK-wide industrial action over pension changes.
- 17 December – A walker dies in an avalanche on Y Garn, in Snowdonia, despite rescue attempts by helicopter and emergency services. A woman escapes with her life in the same incident.
- 29 December – MonmouthpediA is launched in the Welsh media.

== Arts and culture ==
=== Awards ===
- Glyndŵr Award
- National Eisteddfod of Wales: Chair – Rhys Iorwerth
- National Eisteddfod of Wales: Crown – Geraint Lloyd Owen
- National Eisteddfod of Wales: Drama Medal – Rhian Staples
- National Eisteddfod of Wales: Prose Medal – Manon Rhys
- Gwobr Goffa Daniel Owen – Daniel Davies, Tair Rheol Anhrefn
- Wales Book of the Year:
  - English language: John Harrison, Cloud Road
  - Welsh language: Ned Thomas, Bydoedd
- Dylan Thomas Prize: – Lucy Caldwell, The Meeting Point
- Kyffin Art Prize:

=== New books ===
==== Welsh language ====
- Meirion Evans – Cadw Drws
- Jon Gower – Y Storiwr
- Llwyd Owen – Un Ddinas, Dau Fyd

==== English language ====
Factual

- Toby Hamden – The Welsh Guards and the Real Story Of Britain's War In Afghanistan

Fiction

- Jo Walton – Among Others

Poetry

- Gwyneth Lewis – Sparrow Tree

=== Music ===
==== Awards ====
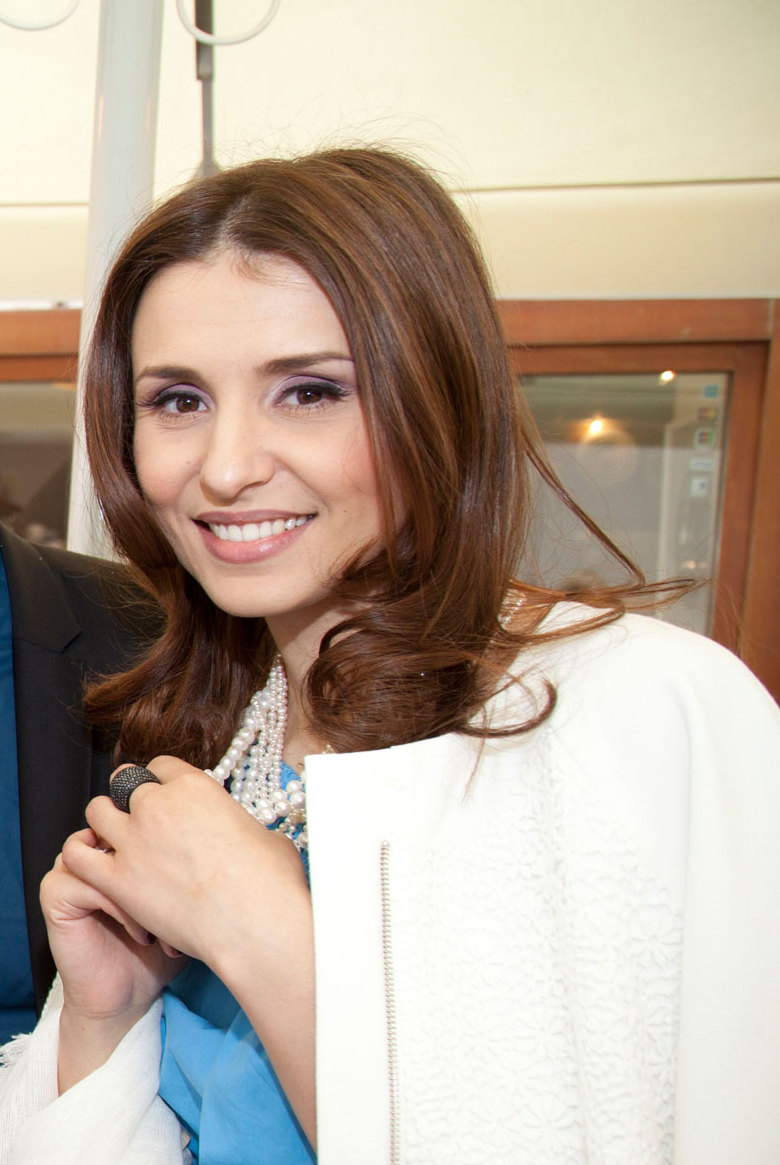
Valentina Naforniţă

- BBC Cardiff Singer of the World competition
  - Main Prize – Valentina Naforniţă
  - Song Prize – Andrei Bondarenko
- Cân i Gymru 2011 – Tesni Jones, "Rhywun yn Rhywle"
- Welsh Music Prize – Gruff Rhys, Hotel Shampoo

==== Classical ====
- Paul Mealor – Ubi Caritas et Amor

==== Albums ====
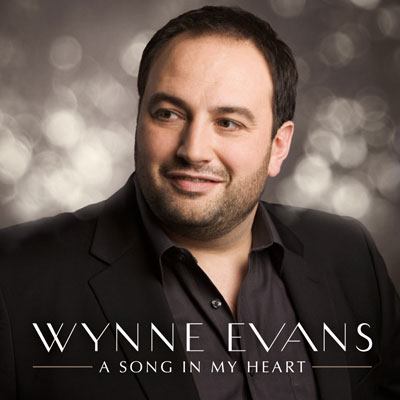
Wynne Evans

- The Blackout – Hope
- Wynne Evans – With a Song in my Heart
- Exit International – Black Junk
- Funeral for a Friend – Welcome Home Armageddon
- The Gentle Good – Tethered For The Storm
- The Joy Formidable – The Big Roar
- Kids in Glass Houses – In Gold Blood
- Kutosis – Fanatical Love
- Los Campesinos! – Hello Sadness
- Lleuwen – Tân
- Gruff Rhys – Hotel Shampoo
- Stagga – The Warm Air Room
- Tri Tenor Cymru – 3 Tenor Cymru (Aled Wyn Davies, Rhys Meirion, Aled Hall

== Film ==
- Aneurin Barnard stars in Hunky Dory, set in Swansea.
- Rhys Ifans stars in Anonymous.

== Broadcasting ==
- Roath Lock television production facility in Cardiff completed and begins production.

=== Welsh-language television ===
- Alys, with Margaret John
- Rhydian, with Rhydian Roberts
- Cariad@iaith:love4language (re-commissioned after being off the air since 2002)

=== English-language television ===
- Baker Boys, starring Boyd Clack, Mark Lewis Jones and Eve Myles, co-written by Helen Raynor and Gary Owen
- Merlin episodes filmed at Raglan Castle and Cosmeston Medieval Village
- Only Boys Aloud: the Academy
- Torchwood: Miracle Day

== Sport ==
=== Athletics ===
- 1 September – Dai Greene wins the gold medal in the men's 400m hurdles at the 2011 World Championships in Athletics.

=== BBC Wales Sports Personality of the Year ===
- Chaz Davies

=== Boxing ===
- 21 May – Nathan Cleverly becomes WBO world light-heavyweight boxing champion.

=== Rugby union ===
- 2 February: Gavin Henson is released from his contract with Saracens and signs a 2 1/2-year contract with RC Toulonnais.

2011 Six Nations Championship:

- 4 February – Wales are defeated 19–26 by England at the Millennium Stadium.
- 12 February – Wales defeat Scotland 24-6 at Murrayfield Stadium, Edinburgh.
- 2 October – Wales defeat Fiji 66-0 at Waikato Stadium, Hamilton, New Zealand, to reach the quarter-finals of the 2011 Rugby World Cup.
- 15 October – Wales are defeated 9–8 by France in the semi-final of the 2011 Rugby World Cup, in a controversial match during which captain Sam Warburton is sent off for a dangerous tackle.
- 20 October – Wales are defeated 21–18 by Australia in the third-place final of the 2011 Rugby World Cup.
- 3 December – Shane Williams plays his last match for Wales, against Australia, scoring his 58th try in the final minutes of the match.

== Deaths ==
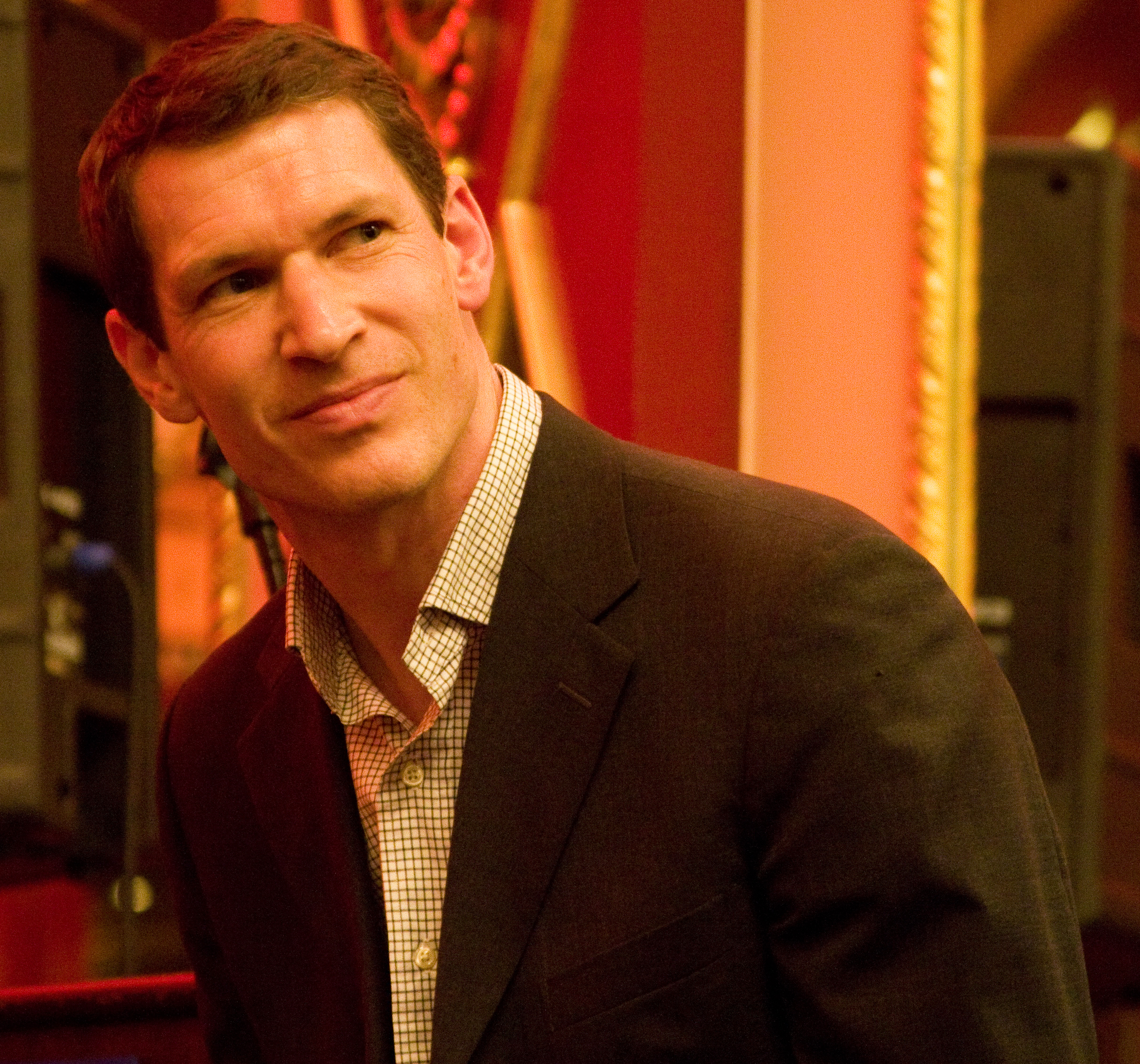
Tim Hetherington

- January – Stewart Williams, local historian, 85
- 25 January – Vincent Cronin, biographer, 86
- 28 January – Dame Margaret Price, soprano, 69
- 2 February – Margaret John, actress, 84
- 8 February – Elaine Crowley, Swansea-based Irish author, 83
- 27 February – Malcolm Davies, rugby league player, 85
- 26 March – Diana Wynne Jones, novelist, 76
- 29 March – Robert Tear, operatic tenor, 72
- 1 April – Brynle Williams, politician, 62
- 4 April – Craig Thomas, novelist, 68
- 20 April – Tim Hetherington, photojournalist and former Cardiff student, 41
- 22 April – W. J. Gruffydd (Elerydd), poet and former Archdruid, 94
- 26 April – Islwyn Morris, actor, 90
- 1 May – Brian Evans, cricketer, 74
- 8 May – Sir Ronald Waterhouse, judge, 85
- 11 May – Glyn Williams, footballer, 92
- 11 June – Idwal Robling, footballer and sports commentator, 84
- 3 July – Dafydd Huws, psychiatrist and politician, 75
- 16 July – Geraint Bowen, poet, 95
- 27 July – Stewart Jones, actor, 83
- 2 August – Richard Pearson, actor, 93
- 3 August – Allan Watkins, cricketer, 89
- 10 August – Selwyn Griffith, Welsh poet, 83
- 16 August – Huw Ceredig, actor, 69
- 29 August – Mark Ovendale, footballer, 37
- 11 September – Andy Whitfield, actor, 39
- 16 October – Caerwyn Roderick, politician, 84
- 24 October – Alan Morgan, bishop, 71
- 12 November – Alun Evans, football official, 69
- 26 or 27 November – Gary Speed, Wales football manager, 42

== See also ==
- 2011 in Northern Ireland
