= Jarvey =

Jarvey or jarvie may refer to:

- The driver of a jaunting car
- Coachman, often referred to as a "jarvey" or "jarvie"

== Literature ==
- The Jarvey (newspaper), a weekly comic newspaper edited by Percy French
- The Adventure of the Laughing Jarvey, a Sherlock Holmes pastiche written by Stephen Fry

== People ==
- Jarvis (disambiguation), of which "Jarvey" can be a nickname
- John Alfred Jarvey (born 1956), US federal judge
- Ken Jarvey, a member of 764-HERO
- Drew Jarvie (born 1948), Scottish footballer
- Paul Jarvie (born 1982), Scottish footballer
- Tom Jarvie (1916–2011), Scottish footballer
- John Jervis, 1st Earl of St Vincent (1735–1823), British admiral, was nicknamed "Old Jarvey"

== Fictional characters ==
- Jarvey, a magical species of Mustelidae in the Harry Potter universe.
