= Gleision Colliery mining accident =

Mining accident

Coordinates: 51.7425°N 3.8014°W

- Date: 15 September 2011
- Location: Cilybebyll, Neath Port Talbot, Wales
- Deaths: 4
- Injuries: 1

The Gleision Colliery mining accident was a mining accident which occurred on 15 September 2011 at the Gleision Colliery, a drift mine at Cilybebyll in Neath Port Talbot, in Wales. The accident occurred while seven miners were working with explosives on a narrow coal seam. Following a blasting operation into a separate disused flooded mine network to increase air-circulation, the tunnel in which the miners were working began to fill with water. Three of the miners escaped, with one being taken to hospital with life-threatening injuries, while the others were trapped underground. A search and rescue operation was launched to locate the four remaining miners, but they were found deceased the following day. The incident is the worst mining disaster to occur in Wales for three decades.

== Explosion and rescue operation ==
The accident occurred in the Gleision Colliery drift mine in the valley of the River Tawe, north of Swansea, in Neath Port Talbot on 15 September 2011. Seven miners were working a narrow seam and using explosives at the coal face. After an intentional explosion, a routine blasting operation to extract coal, at 09.21, the passage in which the miners were working rapidly filled with a large quantity of water. Three miners were immediately able to escape to the surface; one of these was taken by ambulance to Morriston Hospital.

The Mid and West Wales Fire and Rescue Service requested the assistance of Mines Rescue units from Wales and across the United Kingdom, with the aim of rescuing the remaining four miners trapped at a depth of 90 metres (300 ft) below the surface. On 16 September South Wales Police confirmed that all four of the miners had died. All family members were informed of the situation. At that stage formal identification had not yet been made, although the miners were named as Charles Breslin, 62; David Powell, 50; Garry Jenkins, 39; and Philip Hill, 44. Police officially announced the identities of the deceased miners the following day.

== Aftermath ==
On 16 September the Secretary of State for Wales Cheryl Gillan announced that an inquiry would be held into events at Gleision Colliery and that lessons had to be learned. She said the investigation would initially be led by South Wales Police, then handed over to the Health and Safety Executive (HSE). The need for an investigation was echoed by First Minister of Wales Carwyn Jones and Labour Party leader Ed Miliband.

The Health and Safety Executive issued a joint statement with the Wales Office on 17 September saying that it was too early to determine a possible cause, and that Health and Safety officials were on site at Gleision Colliery and working alongside the police. A spokesman said that the HSE would release its findings in due course. On the same day, Peter Hain, the MP for Neath, whose constituency covers the area where the Colliery is situated, said that he had spoken to the miners' families, but that none of the miners had reported any safety concerns at Gleision.

On 18 October 2011, the mine manager, Malcolm Fyfield, was arrested but not charged by South Wales Police on suspicion of manslaughter by gross negligence. Following further investigations he was charged on 18 January 2013 with four counts of manslaughter by gross negligence. The company which owns the colliery, MNS Mining Ltd, was summonsed for four counts of corporate manslaughter. Both Mr Fyfield and the company were subsequently found not guilty.

The HSE report on the investigation has now been published.

== Public response ==
A charity, the Swansea Valley Miners Appeal Fund (Charity Registration Number 1143974), was launched on 17 September and had raised £30,000 within a day of its establishment. The charity was launched by Peter Hain, but is now administered by the Coal Industry Social Welfare Organisation (CISWO, charity reg no 1015581) while Prince Charles, the Prince of Wales agreed to become its Royal Patron. On Sunday 18 September prayers were said at church services across South Wales to remember the dead. Sporting tributes were paid by Swansea City F.C. which held a minute's silence at its ground on the afternoon of 17 September, while the Welsh Rugby team dedicated their win at 18 September's World Cup match against Samoa to the families of the miners.

The poem "Gleision", a reflection of the accident, was composed by Welsh Poet Laureate Gwyneth Lewis who had visited the village only the previous day.
