= St Patrick (ship) =

Tallink ferry

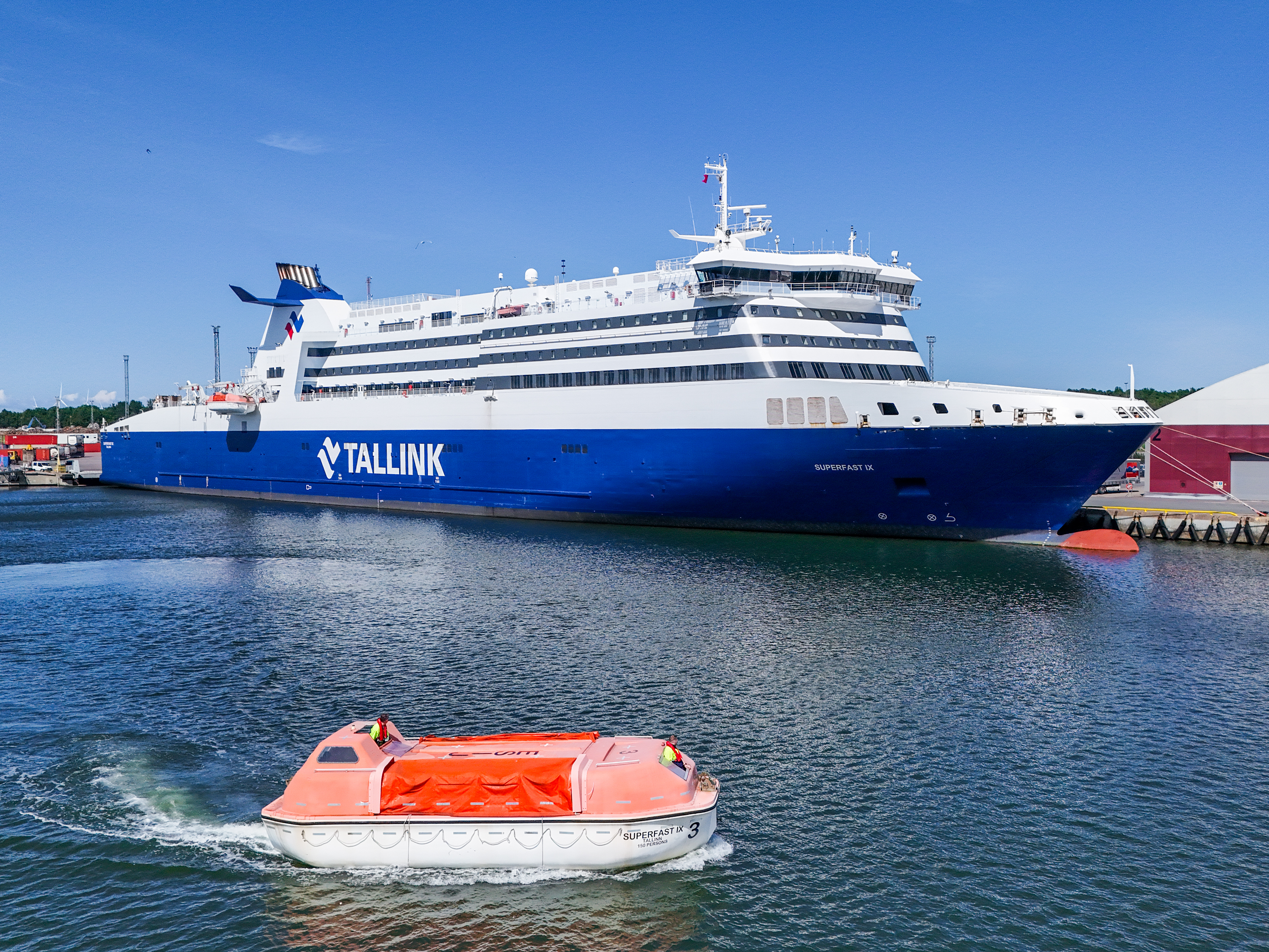
- Superfast IX in Paldiski South Harbour

History

Cyprus
- Name: 2002–2008: Superfast IX; 2008-2024: Atlantic Vision; 2024-2026: Superfast IX; 2026-present: St Patrick
- Owner: 2002–2006: Superfast Ferries; 2006 onwards: Tallink
- Operator: 2002–2006: Superfast Ferries; 2006–2008: Tallink; 2008-2024: Marine Atlantic; 2024-onwards: Tallink; 2026-present: Hibernia Line
- Port of registry: 2002–2006: Piraeus, Greece; 2006–2008: Paldiski, Estonia; 2008-?: Limassol; Cyprus; ?-2024: St. John's, Canada; 2024: Limassol; Cyprus; 2024-2026: Tallinn; Estonia; 2026-present: Limassol; Cyprus
- Route: Cork–Boulogne-sur-Mer
- Builder: HDW, Kiel, Germany
- Yard number: 359
- Launched: 18 November 2000
- Christened: 11 January 2002
- Acquired: 8 January 2002
- Maiden voyage: 10 January 2002
- In service: 10 January 2002
- Identification: Call sign: ESIJ; IMO number: 9211509; MMSI number: 316007000
- Status: In service

General characteristics (as built)
- Type: Ropax ferry
- Tonnage: 30,285 GT; 10,769 NT; 5,915 DWT
- Length: 203.30 m (667 ft)
- Beam: 25.00 m (82 ft)
- Draught: 6.68 m (21 ft 11 in)
- Depth: 9.1 m (29 ft 10 in)
- Decks: 10
- Ice class: 1 A Super
- Installed power: 4 × Wärtsilä-Sulzer 16ZAV40S; 46,000 kW (combined)
- Propulsion: Two shafts, controllable pitch propellers; 2 bow thrusters; 1 stern thruster
- Speed: 30.4 knots (56.3 km/h; 35.0 mph) (maximum); 25.5 knots (47.2 km/h; 29.3 mph) (service)
- Capacity: 626 passengers (as built); 728 passengers (after 2004 refit); 962 passengers (after 2008 refit); 661 cars (as built); 531 cars (after 2008 refit); 2,200 lane meters

St Patrick is a fast ro-pax ferry owned by the Estonian ferry company Tallink and is chartered to the Irish ferry company Hibernia Line. She was built in 2002 as Superfast IX by Howaldtswerke-Deutsche Werft in Kiel, Germany for Superfast Ferries, whose Baltic Sea operations were sold to Tallink in 2006. From 2008 to 2024, she was chartered to Canadian operator Marine Atlantic as Atlantic Vision, operating between North Sydney, Nova Scotia, and the Newfoundland ports of Channel-Port aux Basques and Argentia. She re-entered service for Tallink in 2025 under her previous name, before her charter to Hibernia Line for its Cork to Boulogne-sur-Mer service starting in 2026 as St Patrick.

== History ==
=== 2002–2006: Superfast Ferries service ===
In 2001 Superfast Ferries had made a deal with the Swedish government to operate a ferry connection between Södertälje in Sweden and Rostock for ten years, starting from spring 2002. Superfast IX inaugurated this service in January 2002 (she started service on 10 January but wasn't officially named until the 11). The route proved to be unprofitable, and in April of the same year it was closed down, with Superfast IX laid up at HDW in Kiel. On May of the same year Superfast IX, alongside her sister MS Superfast X, started a new service for Superfast, connecting Rosyth (Scotland) to Zeebrugge (Belgium). In February 2004 she was rebuilt with extra cabins at Fosen Mekaniske Verksteder, Fosen, Norway. In November 2005 Superfast IX was moved to Hanko—Rostock route.

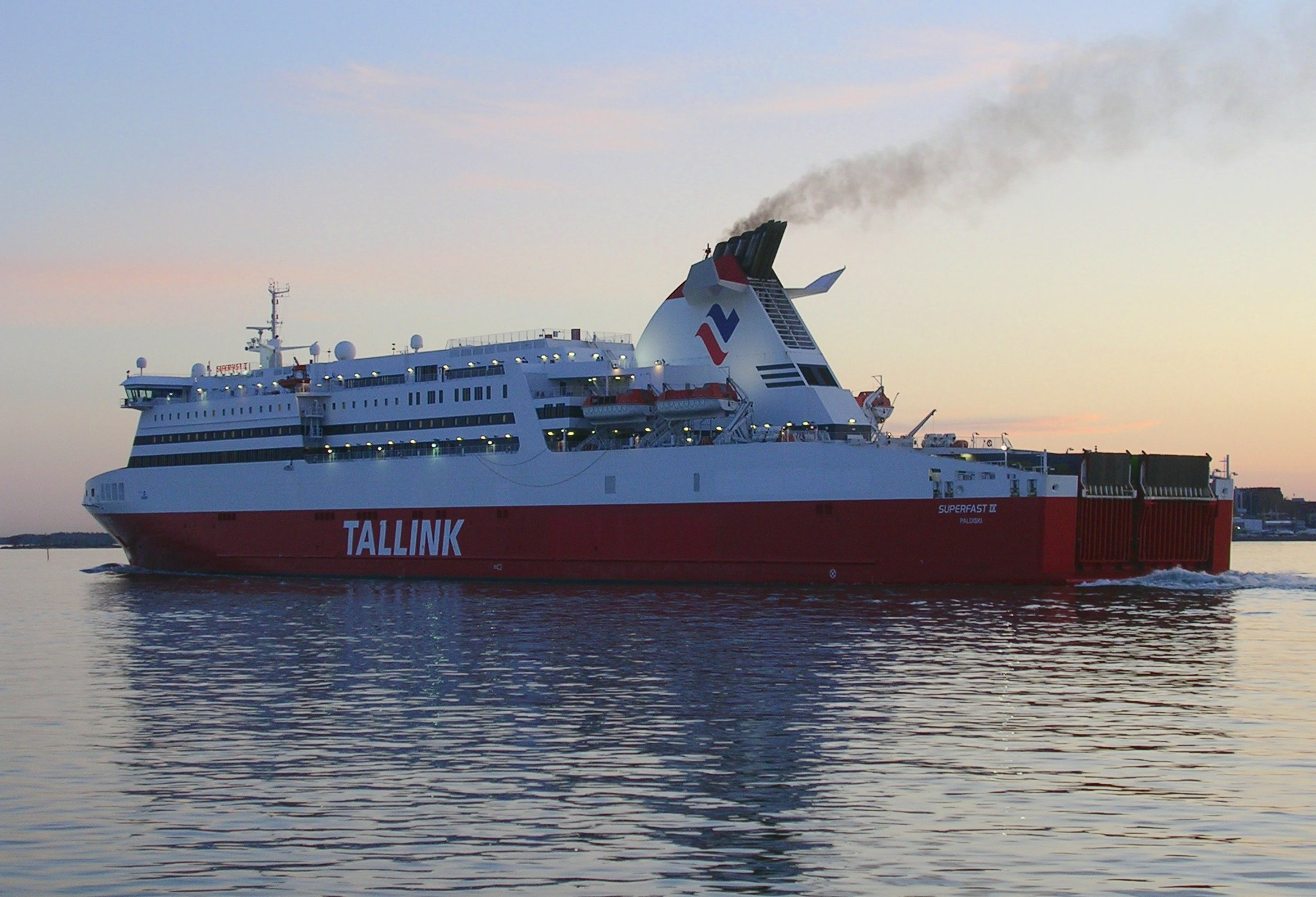
MS Superfast IX departing Helsinki for Rostock, May 2007

=== 2006–2008: Tallink service ===
In March 2006 Superfast sold their Baltic Sea operations to Tallink for €310 million. Following this Superfast IX and her sisters were re-registered to Paldiski in Estonia, and the route changed to Hanko—Paldiski—Rostock from April 2006 onwards. Calling at Paldiski proved problematic as Estonia was not a member of the Schengen Treaty, and in June of the same year the route reverted to Hanko—Rostock. According to the agreement Tallink could keep the Superfast marketing name until the end of 2007, but the ships' hulls soon sported the texts "Superfast operated by Tallink". From the beginning on the year 2007 the ship's route changed to Tallinn—Helsinki—Rostock, with the West Harbour as the port in Helsinki. At the same time all remaining Superfast logos and hull markings were removed. At the time it was reported that coinciding with the move to sail from Helsinki the Superfast ships would be transferred to the fleet of Tallink's subsidiary Silja Line, but this did not came to pass.

=== 2008-2024: Marine Atlantic service ===
In April 2008 Tallink made an agreement for chartering Superfast IX to Marine Atlantic, a Canadian Crown Corporation, for five years from October 2008 onwards. The Government of Canada was to provide Marine Atlantic with $101 million over five years to fund the charter. The ship was to be used by Marine Atlantic on their service between Port aux Basques, Newfoundland and Labrador and North Sydney, Nova Scotia. A naming competition was held for the ship, with students in Newfoundland and Labrador and in Cape Breton eligible to make entries. On 21 June 2008 the results of the competition were published, and Atlantic Vision was chosen as the new name for the vessel.

Superfast IX ceased service with Tallink on 31 August 2008 and subsequently sailed to Turku Repair Yard in Naantali, Finland for reconstruction into her new service. The changes made included the installation of more powerful bow thrusters, rebuilding the bow and stern ramps, and refurbishing the interiors. The ship was renamed Atlantic Vision in November 2008. The reconstruction was completed on 14 November 2008, and on the same date the ship was officially delivered to Marine Atlantic.

Atlantic Vision arrived in St. John's, Newfoundland on 7 December 2008. A renaming ceremony was held for the ship on 11 December 2008, although she had officially been renamed already during the previous month.

Atlantic Vision entered service on the Port-aux-Basques—North Sydney route on 1 April 2009. During the summer months, Atlantic Vision's main purpose was to operate the route between North Sydney and Argentia, Newfoundland and Labrador

On March 15, 2024, Atlantic Vision embarked on her final sailing for Marine Atlantic service, leaving Port aux Basques at 1145am for the last time. She entered service for Tallink on the Kapellskär to Paldiski route in April 2025.

=== 2026-present: Hibernia Line service ===
In March 2026, it was announced that the Superfast IX would be chartered to Hibernia Line for 36 months. Two months later, she was delivered to Hiberina Line as St Patrick, with both a three-year charter extension and a purchase option included in the agreement. She will operate between Cork and Boulogne-sur-Mer.

== Incidents ==
On 27 December 2008, while the ship was still moored in North Sydney awaiting the beginning of service, a fire broke out in one of the two heating units of Atlantic Vision at 11:50 PM local time. The North Sydney fire department assisted the crew in containing the fire to the boiler room. The fire was extinguished by 1:00 AM on 28 December. No injuries were suffered, but the damage to the ship delayed her entry into service, which was originally slated for March 2009.

Atlantic Vision was again forced to dock when a fire broke out in the second of two heating units on 29 July 2009. The ferry was briefly taken out of service again on 18 August, after striking the dock in Port-aux-Basques, causing a "small abrasion" in the fender at the stern of the vessel. The damage was inspected and repaired and Atlantic Vision returned to service later that day.

On 7 October 2009, Marine Atlantic received a bomb threat directed against Atlantic Vision, which was docked in Port-aux-Basques at the time. The vessel was evacuated and investigated by the Royal Canadian Mounted Police (RCMP), but the threat was determined to be a hoax, and she returned to service shortly thereafter.

On 22 December 2009, Atlantic Vision was again taken out of service after high winds forced the vessel against the fenders during docking procedures at Port-aux-Basques, causing a puncture 5 meters above the waterline at the stern of the vessel. The temporary loss of the ship caused additional delays, as other ferries on the North Sydney - Port-aux-Basques run were unable to dock and offload in Port-aux-Basques while she was being repaired. Atlantic Vision was repaired and returned to service late on 23 December 2009.

== Gallery ==
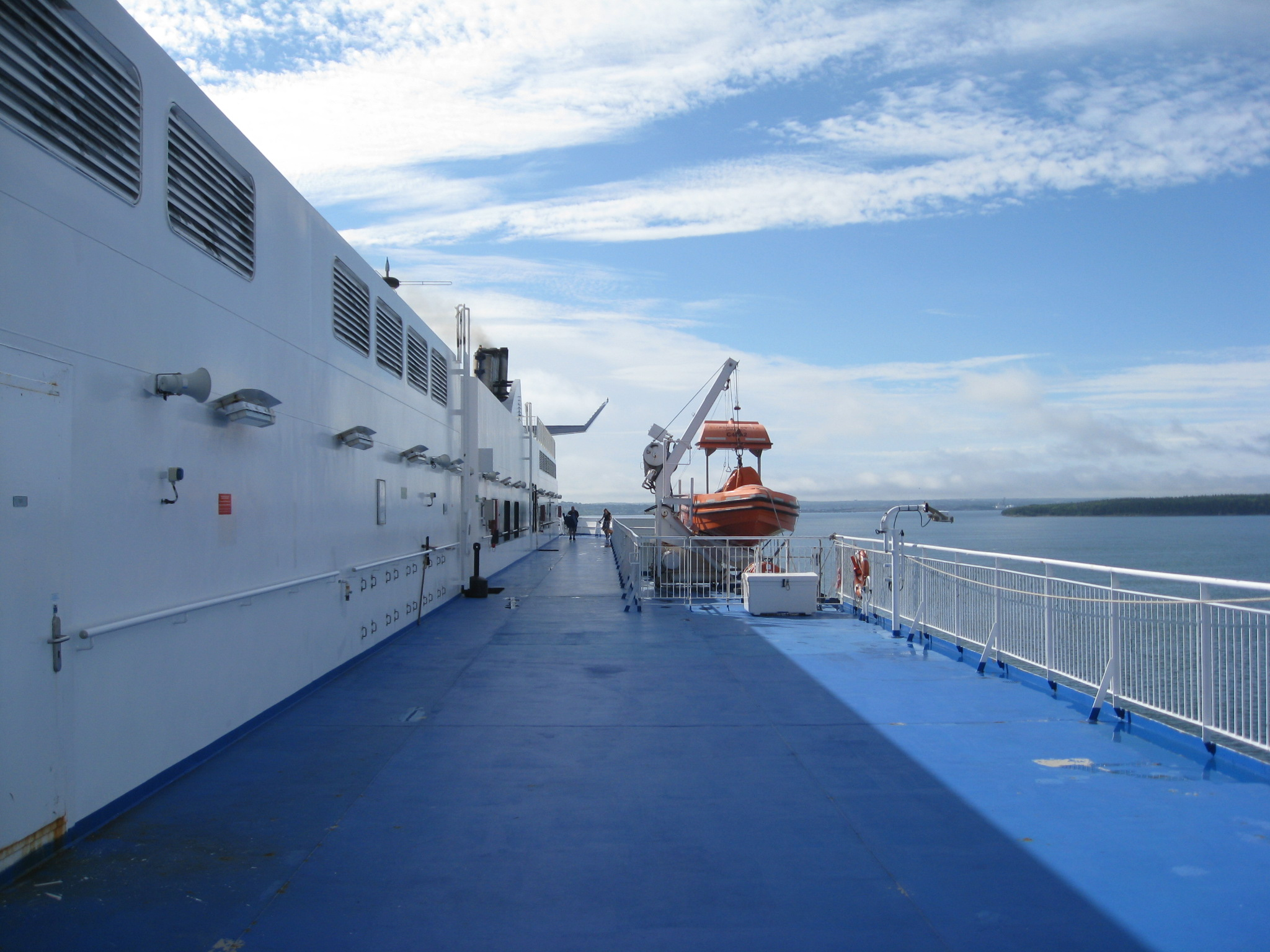
Outer deck

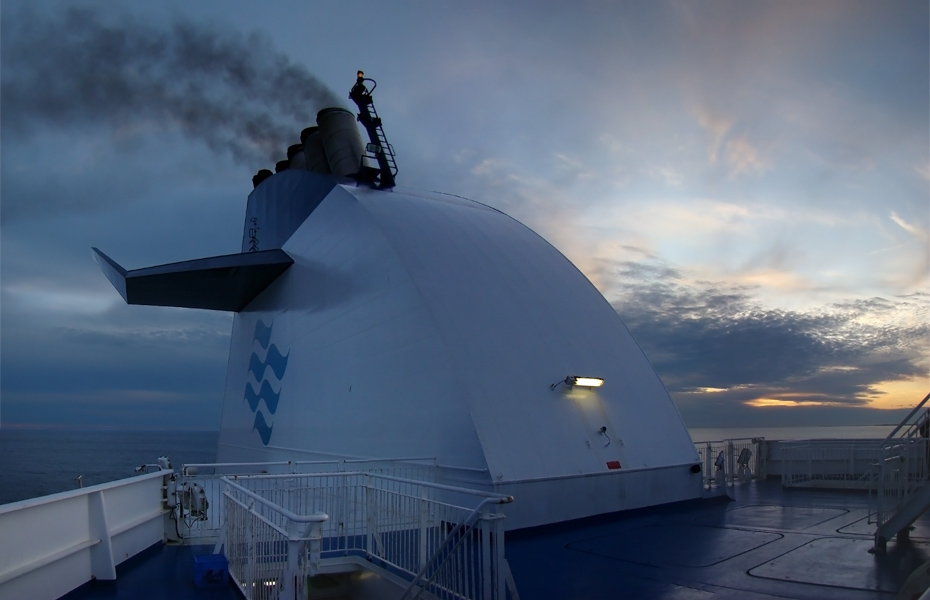
Outer deck

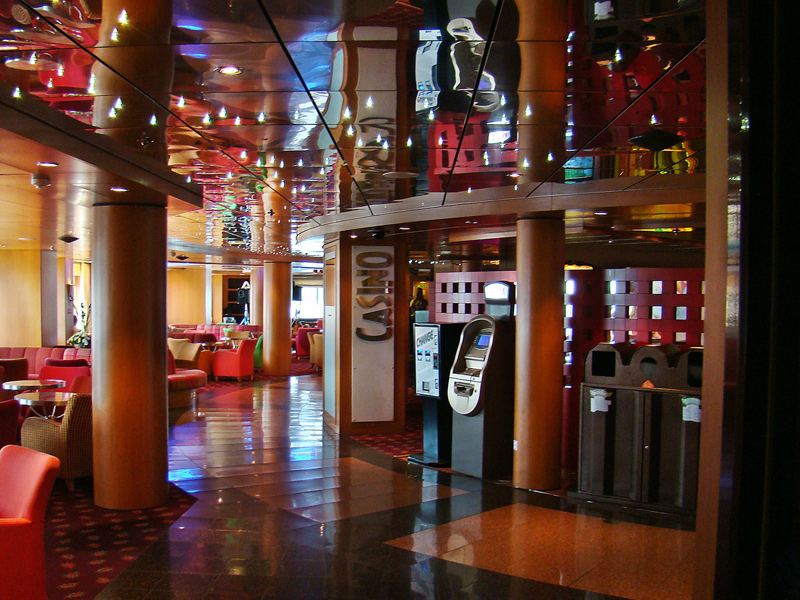
Main lounge

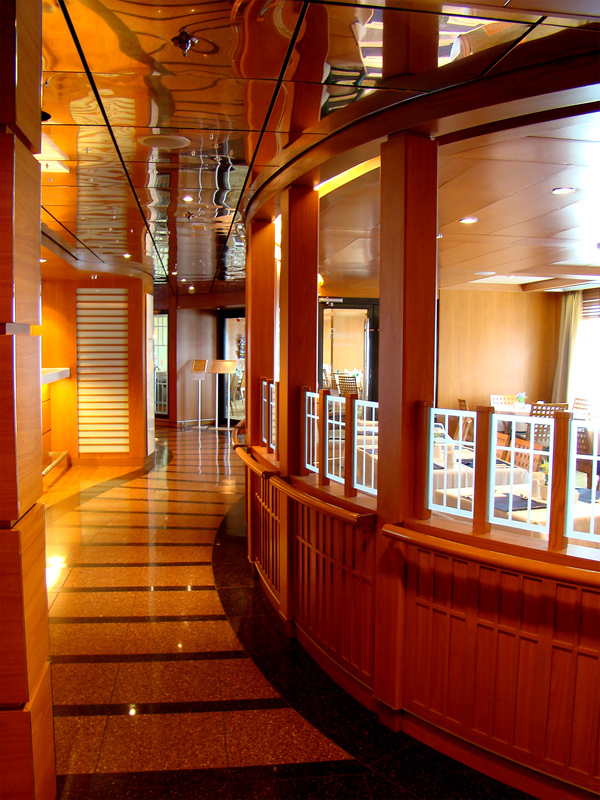
Aisle to restaurant

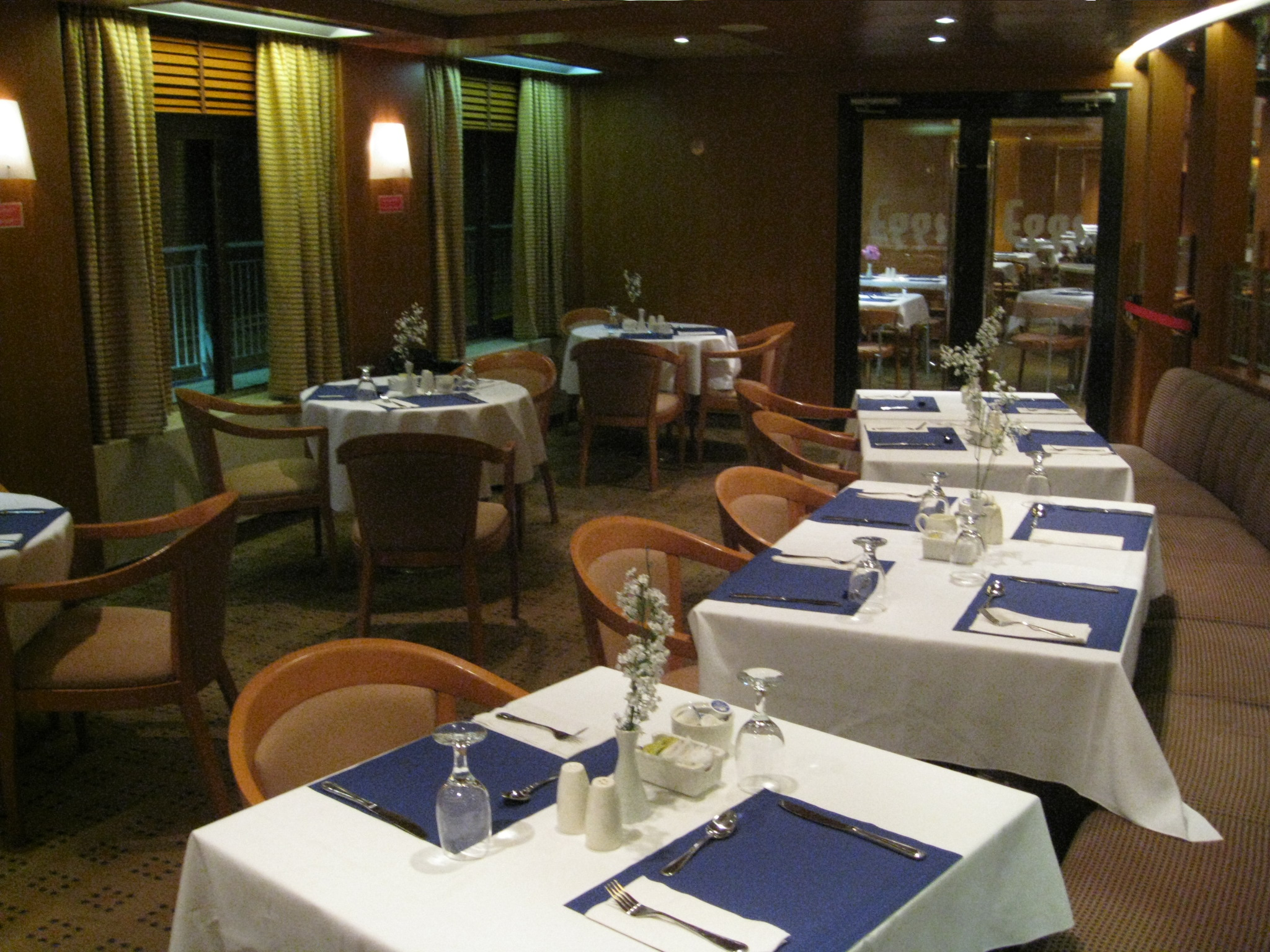
Restaurant

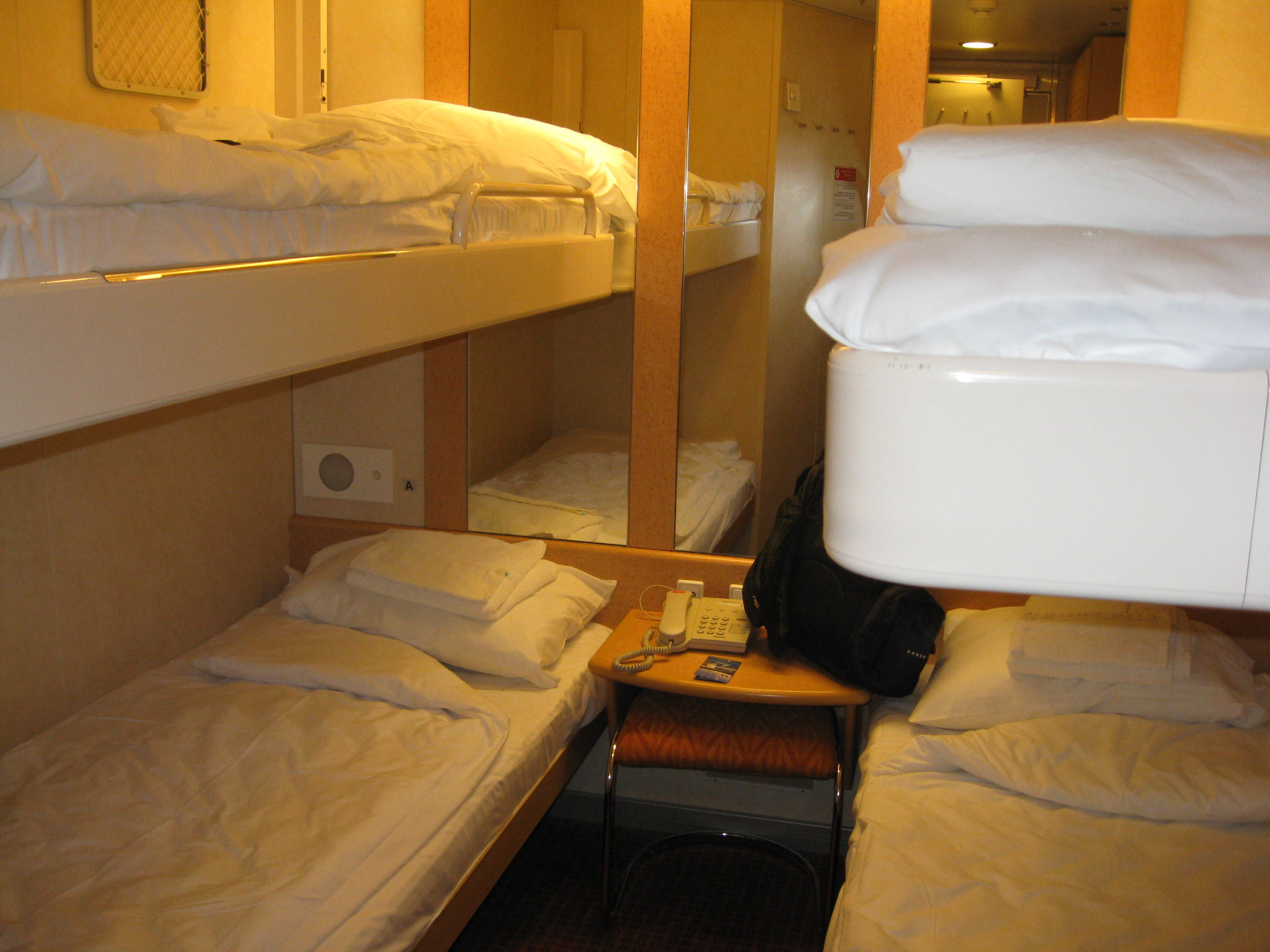
4-berth Cabin
