= 2011 in England =

- Centuries: 19th; 20th; 21st
- Decades: 1990s; 2000s; 2010s; 2020s
- See also: 2010–11 in English football 2011–12 in English football 2011 in the United Kingdom; Other events of 2011

Events from 2011 in England

== Incumbent ==
- Monarch - Elizabeth II
- Prime Minister - David Cameron

== Events ==
=== January ===
- 1 January – Riot at Ford Open Prison is quelled by specialist guards in body armour.
- 3 January – Adrian Lewis wins the World Darts Championship.
- 4 January – Value added tax increased to 20% from 17.5%.
- 5 January – Music retailer HMV announces the closure of 60 stores following disappointing Christmas sales – a move which would see the firm lose 10% of its stores and could cost up to 900 people their jobs.
- 7 January – The England cricket team win The Ashes series 3–1 in Australia.
- 7 January – Former Labour MP David Chaytor is jailed for 18 months for fraudulently claiming more than £20,000 in expenses.
- 13 January – Labour win the Oldham East and Saddleworth by-election.
- 15 January – Three former Church of England bishops are ordained as priests in the Ordinariate of Our Lady of Walsingham of the Roman Catholic Church at Westminster Cathedral.
- 22 January – Police charge 32-year-old Dutch national Vincent Tabak with the murder of 25-year-old Bristol woman Joanna Yeates, who was found dead on Christmas Day after going missing on 17 December. Tabak was first arrested in connection with the murder two days ago.

=== February ===
- 9 February – Former head teacher Jean Else has her Damehood revoked by the Queen, having previously being found guilty of misconduct. She is the first person to have the honour revoked.

=== March ===
- 3 March – The Labour Party wins the Barnsley Central By-election, with the Liberal Democrats finishing in sixth place.
- 18 March – Former British Airways software engineer Rajib Karim, of Newcastle upon Tyne is jailed for 30 years after he was earlier convicted of plotting to blow up a plane.
- 24 March – Police find the body of 22-year-old Sian O'Callaghan in Oxfordshire, five days after she went missing in Swindon, Wiltshire. A 47-year-old man is arrested on suspicion of murder and police are also searching for the body of an unnamed missing woman who is feared to have been murdered.
- 25 March – Delroy Grant, a 53-year-old London taxi driver who was found guilty on a total of 29 charges including indecent assault, burglary and rape committed against 10 elderly people between 1992 and 2009, is sentenced to life imprisonment at Woolwich Crown Court with a recommendation that he should serve at least 27 years in prison before parole can even be considered.
- 26 March – Hundreds of thousands of people march in London, England against government budget cuts with the protests later turning violent. (The Telegraph) (The Guardian)
- 27 March – A 47-year-old taxi driver, Christopher Halliwell, is charged with the murder of Sian O'Callaghan.

=== April ===
- 1 April – South Downs National Park Authority begins operation.
- 5 April – Police investigating the murder of Sian O'Callaghan have identified human remains found at a second site as those of Swindon woman Becky Godden-Edwards, who was last seen alive in 2002 at the age of 20.
- 13 April – 53-year-old actor Brian Regan, most famous for his role as Terry Sullivan in the former Channel 4 TV soap Brookside, is charged – along with another man – with the murder of a man who was fatally shot in Aigburth, Merseyside, on 24 February this year.
- 16 April – Turner Contemporary art gallery, designed by David Chipperfield, opens in Margate, Kent.
- 22 April – Nine people are arrested and eight police officers are injured during riots in Bristol amid a protest against the opening of a new Tesco superstore in the Stokes Croft area of the city.
- 29 April – Prince William, Duke of Cambridge and Catherine Middleton marry in Westminster Abbey. A public holiday celebrates the day, which in conjunction with the May Bank Holiday, makes it a four-day weekend.

=== May ===
- 13 May – Following a decision made at its Bishops' Spring Conference, the Roman Catholic Church in England and Wales announces the reinstatement of the rule of abstaining from eating red meat on Fridays. The practice, last observed in 1984, will be reintroduced on 16 September to coincide with the first anniversary of the visit of Pope Benedict XVI.
- 14 May – The city of Manchester celebrates as Manchester United FC seal their record 19th top division league title and Manchester City FC win the FA Cup, ending the latter's 35-year wait for a major trophy.
- 21 May – The Hepworth Wakefield art gallery, designed by David Chipperfield, opens to the public in West Yorkshire.
- 29 May – Indy-style English racer Dan Wheldon wins the 2011 Indianapolis 500.

=== June ===
- 15 June – St Paul's Cathedral completes its £40m 15-year restoration project.
- 29 June – A court ruling restricting the powers of police bail has thrown thousands of cases in England and Wales into disarray.

=== July ===
- 10 July – The 2011 British Grand Prix was held at Silverstone Circuit and won by Fernando Alonso.
- 12 July – Police (Detention and Bail) Act 2011, affecting England and Wales, receives its Royal Assent.
- 19 July – New Museum of Liverpool opens to the public.

=== August ===
- 7 August – 2011 England riots: The Metropolitan Police struggles to restore order in Tottenham, London after a riot the previous evening.
- 8 August – Prime Minister David Cameron cuts short his holiday to chair a meeting of the COBRA Committee as rioting in London continues into its third day and violence spreads across England with Birmingham, Liverpool, Nottingham and Bristol also affected.

=== September ===
- 5 September – The first wave of independent state-funded schools in England, known as Free Schools, open their doors as the new academic year begins.
- 12 September – Bernard Hogan-Howe is named as the new Commissioner of London's Metropolitan Police.
- 21 September – An energy firm which has been test drilling for controversial "shale gas" in Lancashire has said it has found vast gas resources underground.
- 29 September – The Department for Transport announces a consultation process on raising the motorway speed limit on England and Wales' motorways to 80 mph.

=== October ===
- 1 October –
  - The sale of cigarettes from vending machines is prohibited in England.
  - A new record is set for the highest temperature recorded in October – at 29.9 °C (85.8 °F).
- 5 October – The world's largest solar bridge project gets underway in London.
- 13 October – Uefa's disciplinary panel decide that England striker Wayne Rooney will miss the Euro 2012 group stage after being banned for three matches for his sending off against Montenegro for an incident the panel described as an "assault".
- 21 October – London's St Paul's Cathedral is forced to close its doors to visitors for the first time since the Second World War after Occupy London protesters set up camp on its doorstep.
- 28 October – Dutch engineer Vincent Tabak is convicted of the murder of landscape artist Joanna Yeates and sentenced to life imprisonment.

=== November ===
- 4 November – Several people die and dozens are injured after 27 vehicles collide – many bursting into flames – on the M5 motorway in Somerset.
- 10 November – Hinchingbrooke Hospital in Cambridgeshire becomes the first NHS hospital to be run by a private firm. Healthcare partnership Circle has been awarded a ten-year contract, and will take over administration of the hospital – which has heavy financial debts – in February 2012.
- 19 November – Four Metropolitan Police officers are stabbed while chasing a suspect in Kingsbury, north London. Two officers are seriously injured, while a 32-year-old suspect is arrested for attempted murder.
- 30 November – More than one million public sector workers in England, including teachers and civil servants, strike over proposed pension changes.

=== December ===
- 16 December – The Labour Party's Seema Malhotra retains the Feltham and Heston seat in south-west London for the party in a by-election sparked by the death of the previous MP.
- 27 December – The government plans to allow NHS hospitals to use up to 49% of their hospital beds and theatre time for private patients.

== Predicted and scheduled events ==
=== September ===
- September – firstsite's new art gallery, designed by Rafael Viñoly, opens in Colchester.

== Deaths ==
- 2 January – Pete Postlethwaite, actor (born 1946)
- 15 January – Susannah York, actress (born 1939)
- 15 January – Nat Lofthouse, footballer (born 1925)
- 24 March - Sian O'Callaghan, murder vitim.
- 23 July – Amy Winehouse, singer (born 1983)
- 16 October - Dan Wheldon, British Indy 500 winner (born 1978)

== See also ==
- 2011 in Northern Ireland
- 2011 in Scotland
- 2011 in Wales
