= Gerald Larner =

British music critic (1936–2018)

- Born: March 9, 1936
- Died: December 18, 2018 (aged 82)
- Occupation: Music critic
- Employer(s): The Guardian; The Times
- Known for: Chief Northern music critic at The Guardian (1965–93); Ravel biography
- Notable work: Maurice Ravel (1996)
- Spouse(s): Celia White (m. 1959; div. 1987); Lynne Walker
- Children: 2
- Awards: Officier des Arts et des Lettres (2001)

Gerald Larner (9 March 1936 – 18 December 2018) was a British music critic, best known for his long association with The Guardian and The Times.

== Career ==
He began his career writing for The Guardian, joining as assistant music critic in 1962 and as chief Northern music critic (1965–93). He wrote for The Times from the 1990s. He composed a libretto for a John McCabe opera and wrote a biography of Maurice Ravel.

The Ravel biography was well received in France as well as Britain, and Larner was appointed Officier des Arts et des Lettres by the French Ministry of Culture and Communication in 2001.

== Personal life ==
He married Celia White in 1959, with whom he had two daughters; the marriage ended in 1987. His second marriage was to Lynne Walker.

== Awards ==
Year	Award	Presented by	Notes
2001	Officier des Arts et des Lettres	French Ministry of Culture and Communication	Awarded for his contribution to music criticism

== Selected publications ==
- Glasgow Style (with Celia Larner)
- Maurice Ravel. Phaidon, London, 1996. ISBN 0714832707
