= Capability Scotland =

Charity based in Scotland

Capability Scotland)
- Founded: 31 October 1946
- Type: Charities
- Registration no.: Scotland: SC036524
- Purpose: social care, education
- Location: Capability Scotland, 24 St John's Road, Edinburgh, EH12 6NZ
- Coordinates: 55.9456729°N 3.2266039°W
- Origins: Edinburgh, Scotland
- Region served: Scotland
- Key people: Brian Logan (CEO); Alexander Cameron OBE (Trustee)
- Employees: 856 (April 2021)
- Website: capability.scot
- Formerly called: Scottish Council for Spastics

Capability Scotland is a Scottish charity founded in 1946. Based in Edinburgh with operations across Scotland, it provides care, support, and education for disabled people. The charity offers residential care homes, care at home, housing support, and specialised education through two schools.

== History ==
Capability Scotland was founded on 31 October 1946 by a group of parents and health professionals. Its initial aim was to support children with cerebral palsy.

The first school was opened in Corstorphine, Edinburgh, in 1948. In the early 1960s, the charity began organising employment opportunities for disabled people, and in 1973 the first adult residential home was established.

Whilst the Edinburgh-based Westerlea School was closed in 2016, Capability Scotland operates two other specialist education schools; Stanmore House in Lanark and Corseford School in Kilbarchan.

A new project was established in 2021 to build a brand new residential care home in a new community development in Perth named Bertha Park. The charity aims to complete this by 2026.

== Partnerships ==
Capability Scotland is a member of Disability Agenda Scotland together with Sense Scotland, ENABLE Scotland, RNIB Scotland, Action on Hearing Loss Scotland, and the Scottish Association for Mental Health.

== See also ==
- Anne Mathams
- Cerebral palsy
