= MV Akka (2001) =

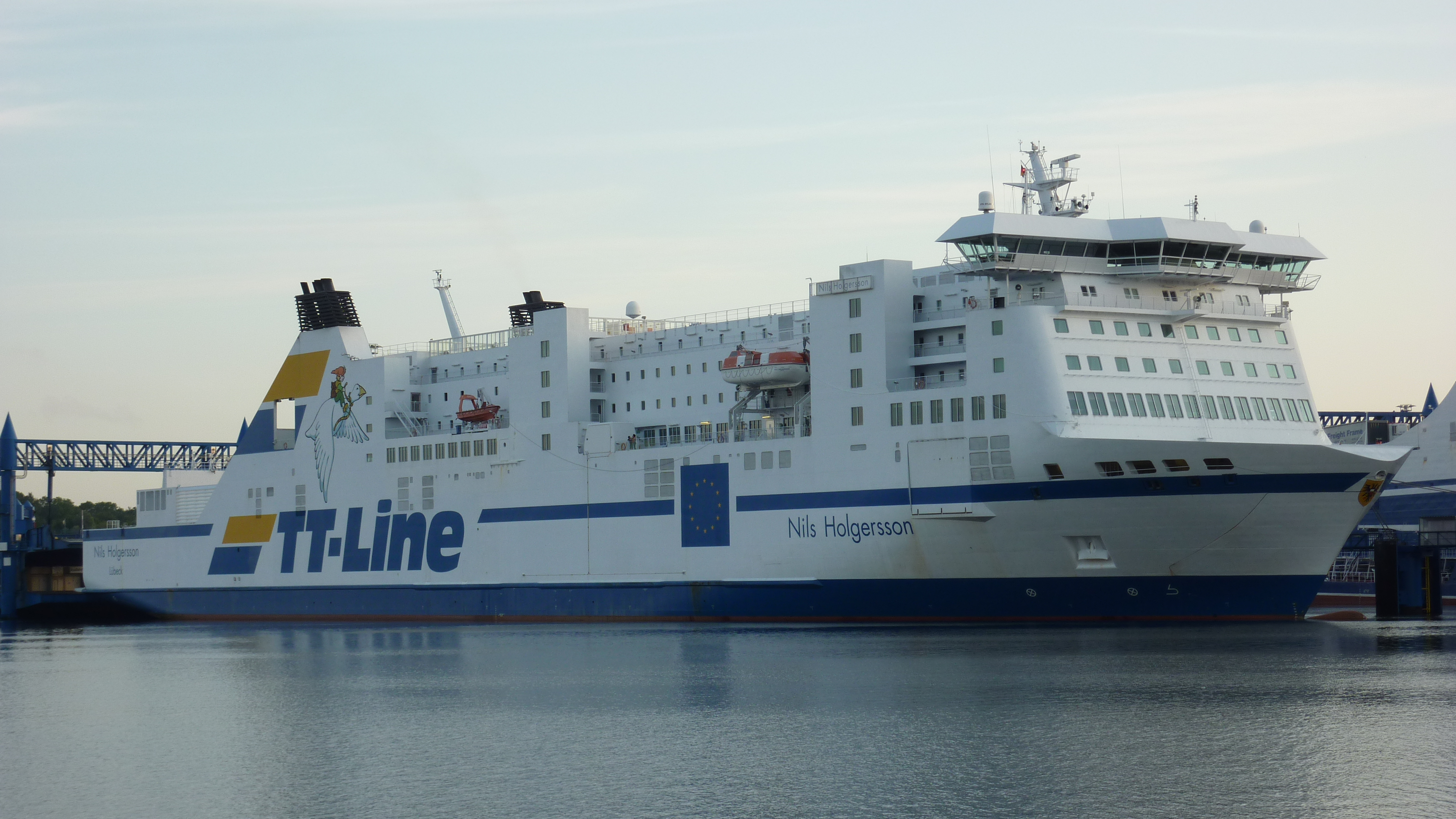
- As "Nils Holgersson"

History
- Name: 2001-2022: Nils Holgersson; 2022 onwards: Akka
- Owner: TT-Line
- Operator: 2001-2025: TT-Line; 2025-6: Superfast Ferries; 2026 onwards: Hibernia Line
- Port of registry: Lübeck, Germany
- Route: Ringaskiddy - Boulogne-sur-Mer
- Builder: Schichau Seebeckwerft
- Identification: IMO number: 9217230

General characteristics
- Tonnage: 36,468 GT
- Length: 190.75 m
- Beam: 29.5 m
- Draught: 6.22 m
- Speed: 21.5 kn
- Capacity: 744 pax; 2600 lane meters

MV Akka is a ropax ferry owned by TT-Line. As of 2026, she is operated by Hibernia Line from Cork to Boulogne-sur-Mer.

== Namesake ==
Initially named after the main character of The Wonderful Adventures of Nils, as the Akka her namesake is a wild goose from the same novel.

== History ==
Built in 2001 for TT-Line as MV Nils Holgersson, the vessel spent the majority of its service life sailing between Germany and Sweden, until the delivery of 2 larger vessels to TT-Line in 2023, upon which she was rechristened Akka.

=== Superfast Ferries ===
Between 2025 and 2026 Akka was chartered to the Greek company Superfast Feries for the Patras - Igoumenitsa - Ancona/Venice - Patras routes.

=== Hibernia Line ===
In June 2026 Akka was chartered to Hibernia Line for the Ringaskiddy - Boulogne-sur-Mer route.

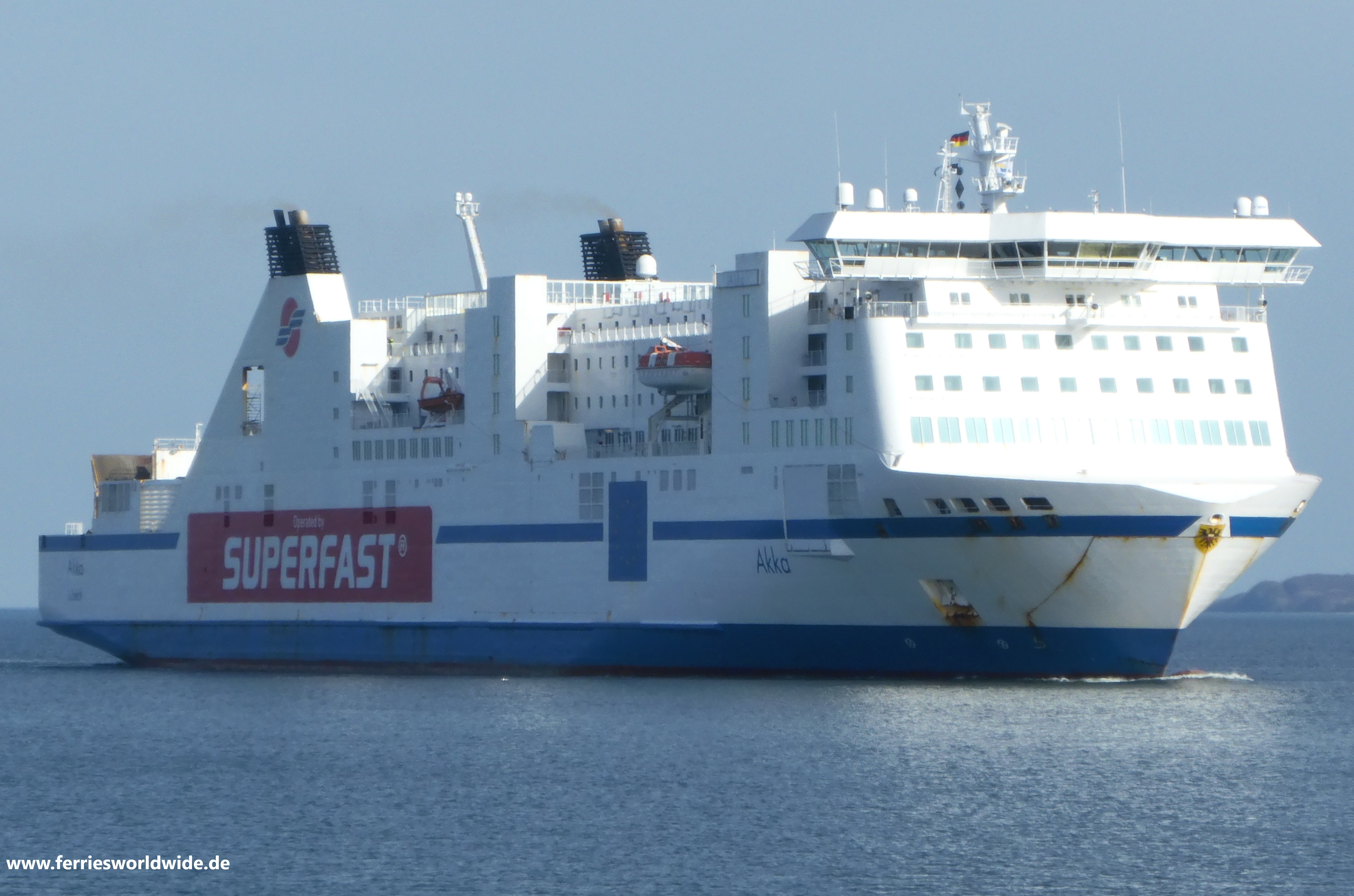
Akka with Superfast

== Sisters ==
- MV Tinker Bell
