= 2011 in Scottish television =

This is a list of events in Scottish television from 2011.

== Events ==
=== April ===
- 12 April – The Nightshift begins airing separate editions in each of STV's four sub-regional areas.
- 24 April – In an open letter to The Sunday Herald, a group of 20 Scottish artists, writers, comedians, actors and musicians, including Alan Cumming, A. L. Kennedy and Mark Millar urge the UK Government to establish a publicly funded Scottish digital television channel. The Government has previously ruled the prospect out until 2017.
- 27 April – ITV plc and STV settle their legal dispute, with the former receiving £18 million from STV.
- Following the completion of digital switchover, the Thursday night programming in Gaelic ends on BBC Two Scotland. Consequently, all programming in Gaelic, with the exception of Children's Gaelic programmes which continued to be broadcast on weekday mornings until 2013 during CBeebies, is broadcast on BBC ALBA.

=== May ===
- 5 May – Coverage of the 2011 Scottish Parliament election.
- 12 May – ITV axes the Scottish police drama Taggart after 28 years, citing poor viewing figures in other parts of the UK.
- 21 May – The BBC says that due to bandwidth restrictions on Freeview, the launch of BBC Alba will require all but three of its radio stations to stop broadcasting on the platform in Scotland while the Gaelic language TV channel is on air. The stations unaffected are BBC 1Xtra, BBC Radio 5 Live and BBC 6 Music.
- 23 May – The Gaelic language television station TeleG closes after twelve years on air.
- 25 May – Digital switchover is completed at the Darvel and Rosneath transmitters and their relays.
- May – Separate half-hour editions of STV News at Six for the East and West are launched along with localised late night news bulletins each weeknight.

=== June ===
- 6 June – The BBC announces that the national variations of BBC One Northern Ireland, BBC One Scotland and BBC One Wales will become available in high definition in 2012.
- 15 June – Digital switchover is completed at the Craigkelly transmitter and its relays.
- 22 June – The last analogue television services are switched off in Scotland following the switchover of the last remaining analogue channels at the Black Hill transmitter, making Scotland the second country in the UK to complete Digital switchover.

=== August ===
- 23 August – As part of its strategy to increase network programming output from Scotland, the BBC confirms that filming of the BBC One school drama, Waterloo Road will be moved to Scotland from April 2012.

=== October ===
- 24 October – STV launches a 30-minute late evening news programme Scotland Tonight.
- The sub-regional editions of The Nightshift are axed and are replaced with a single pan-regional edition serving both of the Northern and Central areas, with opt-outs for regional news.

=== December ===
- The Nightshift is reduced from airing nightly to being on air on four nights a week, airing on Thursday - Sunday nights.

== Debuts ==
=== ITV ===
- 24 October – Scotland Tonight (2011–present)

== Returning this year ==
- 4 September – STV Rugby (2009–2010; 2011–present)

== Television series ==
- Reporting Scotland (1968–1983; 1984–present)
- Sportscene (1975–present)
- The Beechgrove Garden (1978–present)
- Only an Excuse? (1993–2020)
- River City (2002–2026)
- The Adventure Show (2005–present)
- Daybreak Scotland (2007–present)
- Trusadh (2008–present)
- Gary: Tank Commander (2009–2012)
- Sport Nation (2009–present)
- STV News at Six (2009–present)
- Limmy's Show (2010–2013)
- The Nightshift (2010–present)

== Ending this year ==
- 12 February – Brain Box (2010–2011)
- 30 May – The Scheme (2010–2011)
- 30 June – Politics Now (2004–2011)
- 11 October – The Hour (2009–2011)

== Deaths ==
- 31 January – Stuart Hood, 94, writer and television producer
- 12 February – James Elliott, 82, actor

== See also ==
- 2011 in Scotland
