= Hibernia Line =

Hibernia Line is an Irish maritime ferry company operating between Cork and Boulogne-sur-Mer. As of mid-2026, the company was operating two two vessels on the route. By the end of 2026, one of these vessels was reportedly taken out of service for repairs.

== History ==
The company, which has its headquarters in Cork, was formed in 2026 and is reportedly backed by the Goodman Group.

Hibernia Line commenced operations in June 2026 between Ringaskiddy in Ireland and Boulogne-sur-Mer in France. The route's inaugural sailing was undertaken on 12 June 2026 by St Patrick, formerly Superfast IX, a vessel chartered from Tallink. The company's second ferry, Akka, chartered from TT-Line, arrived in Cork Harbour on 13 June 2026. The service was established to carry both passengers and freight, with a scheduled crossing time of approximately 21.5 hours. The route to Boulogne-sur-Mer was reportedly the first international passenger service to serve the French port "in 15 years".

The two ferries initially operated on a rotational basis. However, the service experienced technical difficulties during its first months of operation. On one occasion, St Patrick was required to return to Ringaskiddy following a technical problem. By 11 October 2026, St Patrick had been withdrawn from service for repairs at Damen Shiprepair Dunkerque in France. By mid-November, the ferry remained at Dunkirk, leaving Akka as the sole vessel operating on the company's route. The operator introduced a revised timetable because Akka, which was slower than St Patrick, could not maintain the original schedule. By mid-November 2026, the company had reportedly suggested that St Patrick could return to service by the end of November 2026.

== Routes ==
- Ringaskiddy, County Cork - Boulogne-sur-Mer

== Fleet ==
Hibernia Line operates two vessels:

Name	Built	Gross tonnage	Passengers	Lane meters	Photo	Route	Notes
St Patrick	2002	30285	962	2200		Ringaskiddy - Boulogne-sur-Mer	Chartered from Tallink. In October 2026, the vessel was "forced off service to receive repairs".
Akka	2001	36468	744	2600		Ringaskiddy - Boulogne-sur-Mer	Chartered from TT-Line

== See also ==
- DFDS
