= Ronnie McCluskey =

Scottish footballer

Personal information
- Full name: Ronald McCluskey
- Date of birth: 3 November 1936
- Place of birth: Johnstone, Scotland
- Date of death: 23 June 2011 (aged 74)
- Place of death: Dunbar, East Lothian, Scotland
- Position: Goalkeeper

Senior career*
Years	Team	Apps	(Gls)
1956–1960	East Fife	66	(0)
1960–1961	Accrington Stanley	4	(0)
Total		70	(0)
- * Club domestic league appearances and goals

Ronald McCluskey (3 November 1936 – 23 June 2011) was a Scottish footballer, who played as a goalkeeper. McCluskey played for East Fife, Accrington Stanley and several English non-league clubs during his career.
