= David Brown (Scottish cricketer) =

Scottish cricketer

Personal information
- Full name: David Basil Stuart Brown
- Born: 14 June 1941; Insch, Aberdeenshire, Scotland
- Died: 11 March 2011 (aged 69); Aberdeen, Aberdeenshire, Scotland
- Batting: Left-handed

International information
- National side: Scotland

Career statistics
Competition	First-class
Matches	3
Runs scored	115
Batting average	19.16
100s/50s	–/1
Top score	58
Catches/stumpings	2/–
- Source: Cricinfo, 6 April 2011

David Basil Stuart Brown (14 June 1941 – 11 March 2011) was a Scottish cricketer. Brown was a left-handed batsman. He was born in Insch, Aberdeenshire.

Brown made his first-class debut for Scotland against Ireland in 1973. He played two further first-class matches, which came against the same opposition in 1974 and 1975. In his three first-class matches, he scored 115 runs at a batting average of 19.16, with a single half century high score of 58.

Outside of first-class cricket, Brown was capped a further 16 times for Scotland, one of which he played a non first-class match against the touring Indians. He also played cricket for Aberdeenshire Cricket Club, who he captained in 1974 and 1975. As a professional career, Brown was a police officer. He joined Grampian Police in 1960 and over the course of the next two decades he moved up through the ranks to become an Inspector. He played cricket for the Scottish and British police cricket teams.

In November 2010, Brown was inducted into Aberdeen's sporting hall of fame, alongside Sir Alex Ferguson and Katherine Grainger. Brown died on 11 March 2011, just months after being diagnosed with a brain tumor.
