= Brian Bonsor =

British composer and musician

Brian Bonsor MBE

James Brian Bonsor MBE (21 August 1926 – 22 February 2011) was a Scottish-born composer and teacher specialising in the recorder.

== Life and career ==
Brian Bonsor was born in Hawick, Roxburghshire on 21 August 1926. Following war service he studied at Moray House in Edinburgh and at Trinity College, London, to become a music teacher. He studied briefly with the recorder player Carl Dolmetsch.

Bonsor spent about 35 years in musical education, teaching in primary and secondary schools, including 17 years at Hawick High School. He taught further education classes and summer courses and later acted as Regional Education Advisor for the Scottish Borders in the 1970s.

He was awarded an MBE in 2002 for services to teaching music, in particular the recorder. Enjoy the Recorder, written by Bonsor, is used to teach the recorder in schools. His arrangements for recorders include Percy Grainger's Mock Morris (1985), Cats by Andrew Lloyd Webber, and Strauss's Emperor Waltz (1985). Bonsor was a musical director for the Society of Recorder Players from 1967.

Bonsor wrote the piano piece Dreamy, which was featured in Trinity Guildhall's 2012–2014 Grade 6 repertoire. His piece Feelin' Good was included in the ABRSM's 05/06 grade 6 repertoire, the Royal College of Music's grade 7 repertoire and the Australian Music Examinations Board's grade 6 Old Syllabus and Willie Wagglestick's Walkabout for the ABRSM's 07/08 grade 7 repertoire and AMEB's grade 7 Old Syllabus.

Bonsor died in Hawick on 22 February 2011.

== List of compositions ==
- Bagatelle
- Beguine, 2 recorders, piano
- Second Beguine, 2 descant recorders, 2 treble recorders, 2 violins, piano and percussion
- By the brook, recorder, piano
- Calliope, 3 recorders
- Carebbean, recorder, piano
- Carriage and pair, 3 recorders, piano
- Celebration time!, 6 recorders, piano
- Dreamy, piano
- Easy Jazzy duets, 2 recorders
- Fiesta, 3 recorders, piano
- Feelin' Good, 2 recorders
- Happy - go - lucky, 3 recorders
- Happy whistler, 3 recorders
- Here we go, 2 recorders
- Hoe down, 2 recorders, piano
- Jemina, recorder, piano
- Little clock, 2 recorders
- Nice and easy, recorder, piano
- On parade, recorder, piano
- Over to you, 2 recorders
- Rumba, 2 recorders, piano
- Scherzino, recorder, piano
- Serenata, recorder, piano
- Simple Samba, 2 recorders, piano
- Summer afternoon, recorder, piano
- Suite for SAMA (SATB recorders), 2008
- Sunny island, 3 recorders
- Swing your partners, recorder, piano
- Tango, 3 recorders, piano
- Three into 5, recorders (SAT, divisi, 3 or 5 Recorders), piano
- Time to tango, 2 recorders
- Tig, 3 recorders
- Valerie, 2 recorders, piano
- Waltz for Mo, recorder, piano
- Willie Wagglestick's Walkabout, piano
