= Lynne Walker (critic) =

British music critic (1956–2011)

- Born: October 24, 1956; Edinburgh, Scotland
- Died: February 10, 2011 (aged 54); Alderley Edge, Cheshire, England
- Education: Mary Erskine School; Napier College; Huddersfield University
- Occupations: Music and theatre critic; broadcaster
- Employer(s): BBC; The Independent
- Known for: Arts criticism; BBC Radio 4 Kaleidoscope; Radio 3 programme In Tune
- Spouse: Gerald Larner (m. 1989)
- Awards: Napier College (1976)

Lynne Walker (24 October 1956 – 10 February 2011) was a British music and theatre critic. Walker was a regular broadcaster for the BBC.

== Early life and education ==
Born in Edinburgh, she attended the Mary Erskine School. She won a medal at the end of her time at Napier College in 1976, and gained a degree from the Huddersfield School of Music (now part of Huddersfield University). At the Huddersfield School, she studied oboe, the piano and conducting. It was at this time that Walker became drawn to the Huddersfield Contemporary Music Festival, and gained a scholarship to study choral conducting in France under Arthur Oldham.

== Career ==
=== Music and arts administration ===
Her early career was as a musician, but she migrated to marketing and publicity in the early 1980s, working for the Royal Scottish National Orchestra (RSNO) in Glasgow, being involved in the RSNO's Music Nova (New Music) festival and editing the orchestra's journal, SNOscene. She performed a similar role for the Royal Exchange theatre in Manchester (1987–94). In 1991 she began her own editorial consultancy Edgewise with the music critic Gerald Larner, whom she had married in 1989. Together, the couple wrote music programmes for the Barbican Centre, Wigmore Hall and other concert venues. (Larner died in December 2018.) Walker was appointed programme editor for the Edinburgh International Festival in 1992.

=== Broadcasting and journalism ===
Simultaneously she had begun a freelance career in journalism and broadcasting. For about a decade, until the programme was dropped in 1998, she was a contributor to (and for its last two years presenter) of the BBC Radio 4 arts magazine Kaleidoscope. She also hosted the Radio 3 programme In Tune.

By 2000 she was a more regular contributor to The Independent, responsible for the newspaper's coverage of theatre events at the Edinburgh Festival, feature articles and arts criticism with an emphasis on the north of England.

== Death ==
Lynne Walker died in Alderley Edge, Cheshire, having had cancer for ten years.

== Awards ==
Year	Award	Institution	Notes
1976	Napier College medal	Napier College	Awarded at the end of her studies
