= Elaine Crowley (author) =

Irish novelist

- Born: Helena Bridget Rowland; 30 May 1927; Dublin, Ireland
- Died: 8 February 2011 (aged 83); Swansea, Wales
- Occupation: Novelist
- Spouse: David Crowley (m. 1949)

Elaine Crowley (born Helena Bridget Rowland; 30 May 1927 – 8 February 2011) was an Irish novelist.

Crowley was born in the Liberties area of Dublin in 1927 to a Brighton-born father and an Irish mother. Her father died from tuberculosis in 1942. She eventually left Ireland at the end of the Second World War and joined the Auxiliary Territorial Service (ATS) — a branch of the British army staffed entirely by women. She spent most of her adult life in Wales.

== Works ==
She is best known for her novels Dreams of Other Days, The Young Wives and a Family Cursed, all written during her latter years. She wrote a memoir of her childhood, A Dublin Girl: Growing Up in the 1930s (1996).

== Personal life ==
Crowley lived in Port Talbot with her husband; the couple had six children, eighteen grandchildren, and a large extended family. She died in Swansea on 8 February 2011, aged 83, from undisclosed causes.
