= Rosyth – Zeebrugge ferry service =

Ferry route between Scotland and Belgium

The Rosyth – Zeebrugge ferry service was a freight-only service operated by DFDS. The service replaced a passenger and freight service that was initially operated by Superfast Ferries between May 2002 and September 2008, and then by Norfolkline from 18 May 2009 until 15 December 2010. It was the only direct ferry route between Scotland and Continental Europe. On 20 August 2010 it was announced that the passenger service would end on 15 December 2010, although the freight-only service resumed shortly thereafter. The service was terminated in 2018 following a fire aboard one of the ships.

In 2022, it was announced that the Scotland to mainland Europe ferry link would return in 2023 for freight services. A further study was being carried out to determine the feasibility of future passenger business.

== Route ==
The route crossed the North Sea between Rosyth, Fife, Scotland and Zeebrugge, Flanders, Belgium. Near Rosyth, the ferry passed under the Forth Bridge.

== Superfast Ferries ==
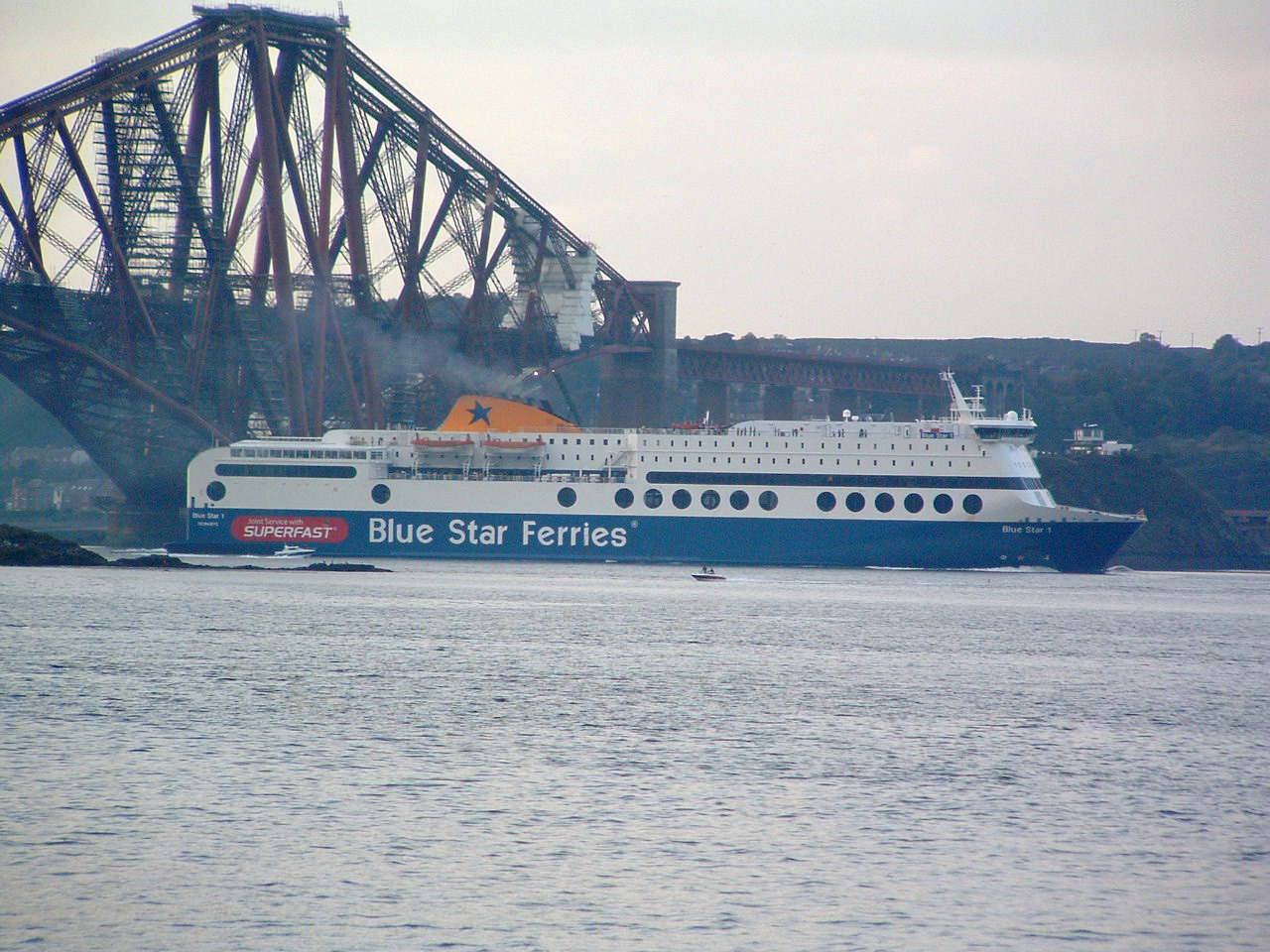
Blue Star 1 under the Forth Bridge in the Firth of Forth, Scotland

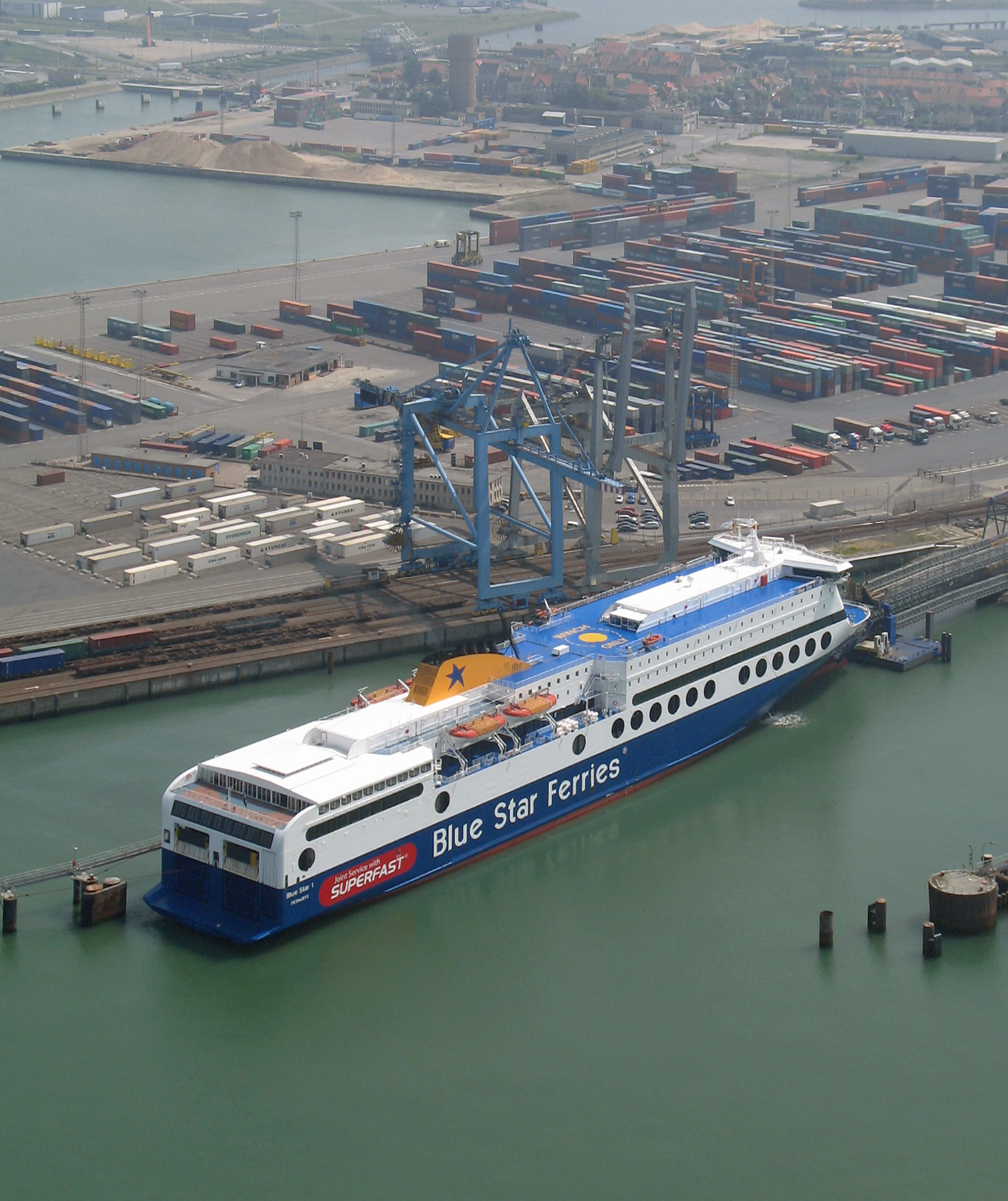
Blue Star 1 in the port of Zeebrugge, Belgium, June 2007

Following a detailed consultation and tendering process by the Scottish Executive, the Greek shipping company Superfast Ferries (owned by the Attica Group) were confirmed as the operator of the route. Services commenced in May 2002 using two ships - MS Superfast IX and MS Superfast X - to provide an overnight service with a crossing time of 17 hours.

Whilst car traffic, particularly in the summer months, proved relatively good, concern mounted that there were insufficient lorries and other freight traffic to make the service viable in the long term. The service was reduced to three times per week in 2005 and Superfast IX transferred to the Baltic Sea.

In 2006, the sale of Superfast X was announced and the vessel was replaced with the smaller Blue Star I - of Superfast's sister company Blue Star Ferries (also owned by Attica). In 2008 it was announced that Superfast/Blue Star Ferries would discontinue the service in September.

== Norfolkline ==
The decision to axe the route caused considerable political disquiet in Scotland. The Scottish Government sought to encourage a new operator to take over the route. In late 2008 Norfolkline announced that it would restart the route in May 2009, again using a thrice-weekly overnight service (but extended to 20 hours, rather than the previous 17 hours, to reduce fuel consumption). Like Superfast, the Norfolkline service offered a service for both vehicle and foot passengers.

Norfolkline is a Netherlands-based subsidiary of the Danish shipping company DFDS and formerly of the Maersk Group. On 17 December 2009 DFDS announced that it had agreed to purchase Norfolkline from Maersk.

Norfolkline's vessel for the route was the MV Scottish Viking (which, despite the name, is registered in Italy). On 5 August 2010 the vessel collided with a small fishing boat off the coast of Scotland, resulting in the loss of the fishing boat and the death of one of the two men aboard the fishing boat.

== DFDS Seaways ==
On 20 August 2010 DFDS announced that the passenger service would end on 15 December 2010, with the service being replaced by a DFDS Seaways freight-only ferry service. The replacement freight-only service was operated with two ferries the Tor Finlandia and the Cimbria Seaways with 4 departures per week. In April 2011, this was reduced to one DFDS Seaways freight-only ferry operating three departures per week. In August 2014, concerns were raised over the future of the Rosyth - Zeebrugge link. Following the signing of a memorandum of understanding between DFDS Seaways, The Scottish Government and Forth Ports Authority, the scheduled services were set to continue. Enhanced freight capacity would be made possible by infrastructure improvements at Rosyth allowing containers to be double stacked.

Following an engine room fire on Finlandia Seaways on Monday 16 April 2018. DFDS Seaways announced on 23 April 2018 that the route from Rosyth to Zeebrugge would close with immediate effect as it was not economically viable.
