= Waking the Dragon =

Proposed sculpture in Chirk, Wales

Coordinates: 52.9476668°N 3.0427631°W

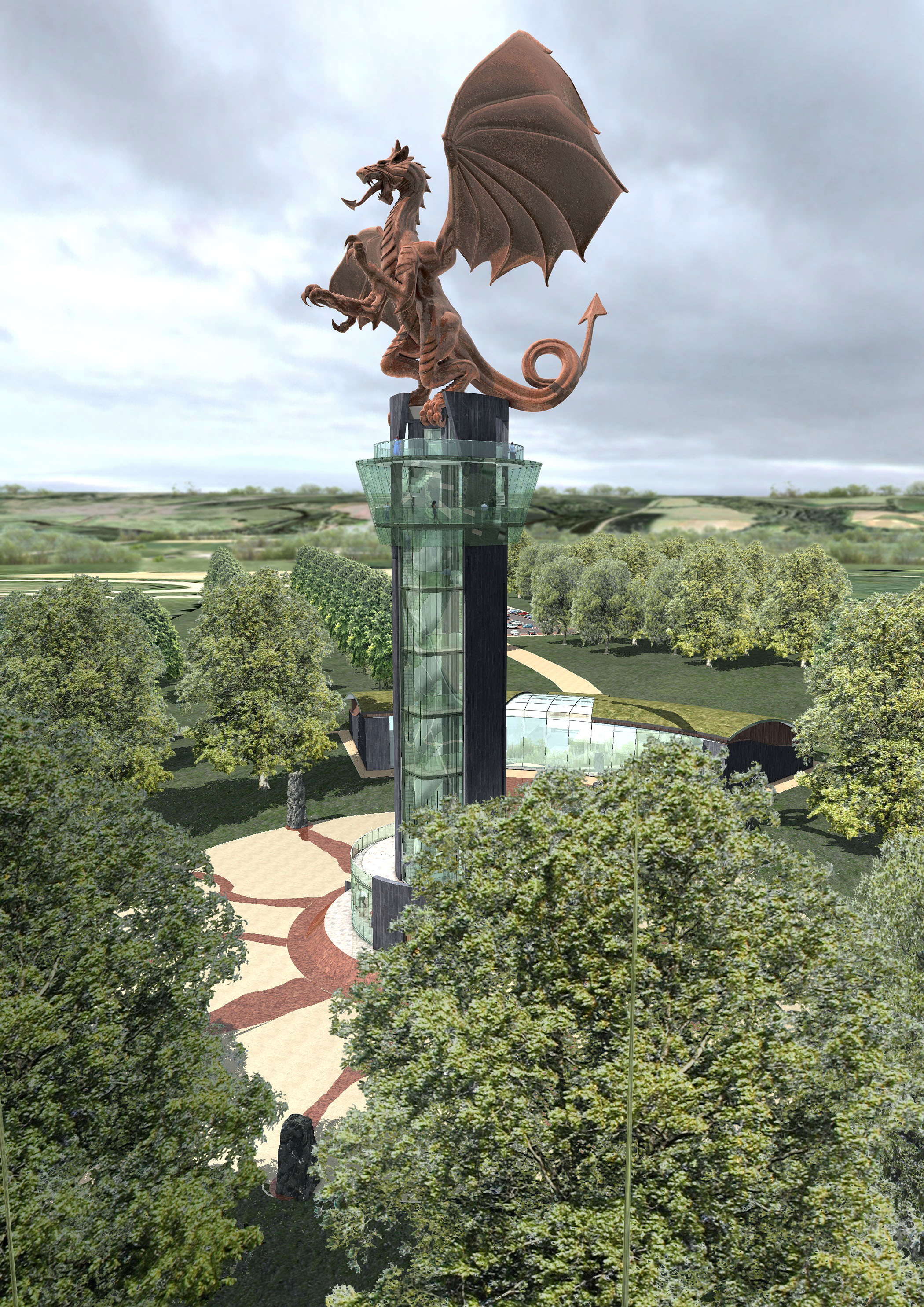
An Artist's unofficial render of the proposed statue. There may be other impressions of the statue.

Waking the Dragon (Welsh: Deffro'r Ddraig) is a proposed bronze sculpture which is intended to be built near Wrexham, North Wales.

The original idea, made in 2010, was for a sculpture which would stand 210 feet (64 m) tall, symbolising the heritage and culture of the Welsh people. The project was to be funded through a combination of charitable donations, the purchase of steps within the tower and investor finance.

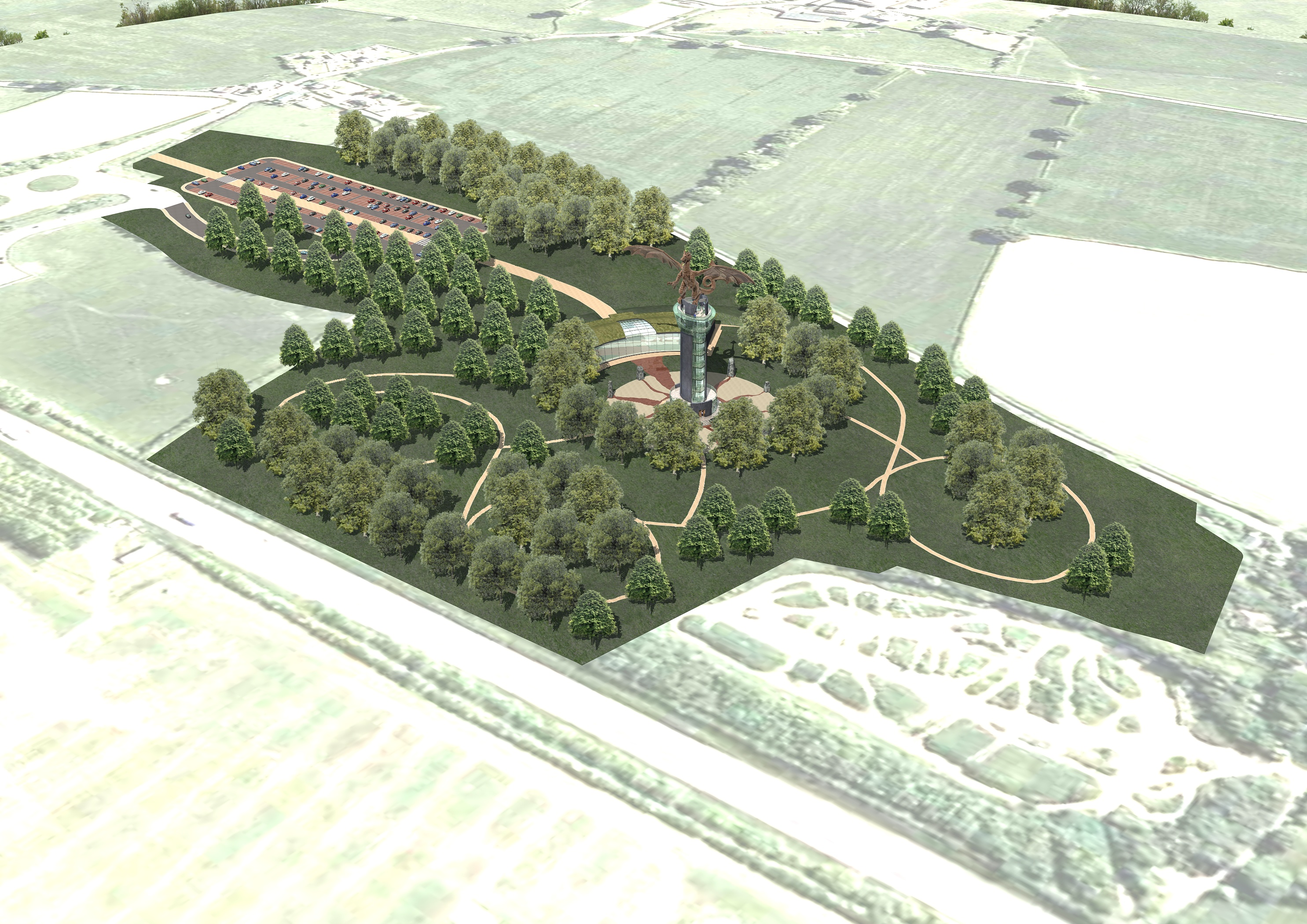
Potential site plan for the structure. This is an artist's render and is not official, there may be other proposed plans.

The project was to consist of a 75-foot bronze dragon with a wingspan of approximately 150 feet, standing upon a 135-foot glass and steel tower, which would allow for panoramic views of Wrexham, its surrounding countryside and across the border into England. The project intended to include a 100-seat café/bar, a 125-seat restaurant, an art centre and a gallery next to the tower. The space immediately around the tower was to be used to depict the Four Branches of the Mabinogion, the collection of mythological tales of early Wales.

It was originally intended to sit adjacent to the A5 and was hoped to be completed by August 2011. It was subsequently hoped to be completed by the 2012 Summer Olympics held in London.

In 2013 local businessman Simon Wingett, the originator of the scheme, launched a crowd funding initiative to raise money for the project. The dragon was to be sited on a roundabout at Chirk near Wrexham. Planning permission for the dragon was reinstated in 2016 for a further five years, after the original permission had lapsed. In September 2022, Wingett was ordered by the High Court to pay at least £117,000 to charitable cancer causes due to investing his cancer charity donations for the dragon project rather than to charitable causes since 2011. As of 2025, the web domain for the project has expired and its fate of the project is unknown. If completed, it would be the world's second largest statue of a European dragon, after the dragon from Pegasus and Dragon in Hallandale Beach, Florida. It would have been the world's largest between 2011 and 2014 had the original timeline of completion occurred.

== See also ==
- List of tallest statues
