= Anne Mathams =

Scottish educationist and disability rights activist

- Born: 6 May 1913; Edinburgh
- Died: 21 February 2011 (aged 97); Edinburgh

Anne Muirhead Mathams FEIS (6 May 1913 – 21 February 2011) was a Scottish educationist, innovator and disability rights activist.

== Early life ==
Anne Muirhead Mathams was born in Scotland in 1913, the elder of two children born to Robert Mathams and Annie Mathams. Her father died in 1924 as a result of injuries sustained during the First World War. Her grandfather was Walter John Mathams, a Church of Scotland minister who wrote the popular children's hymn, "Jesus Friend Of Little Children".

Mathams attended St George's School for Girls in Edinburgh, and trained as a teacher at the Jersey Ladies' College and Moray House.

== Career ==
While training as a teacher, Mathams found an interest in working with young children with physical disabilities. She was headmistress at Stanwell Nursery in 1936, at St Leonard's Nursery in 1939, and at Moray House Nursery in 1941. She became the first head mistress at the Westerlea School in 1948, in charge of a residential programme established by the Scottish Council for the Care of Spastics. She designed equipment, worked with therapists and parents, and created a mail-based program for children and families who could not attend in-person programming. She retired from teaching in 1978.

Mathams was a founding member of Capability Scotland, and held a life membership in the Educational Institute of Scotland. She was awarded the Elsie Inglis Award in 2000, recognizing her long career of service in education.

== Personal life ==
Mathams died on 21 February 2011, aged 97 years, at the Colinton Care Home in Edinburgh.
