= Tarenni Colliery =

Coal mine series

The Tarenni Colliery (Welsh: Gloddfa Tarenni) and its associated workings, are a series of coal mines and pits located between the villages of Godre'r Graig and Cilybebyll located in the valley of the River Tawe, in Neath Port Talbot county borough, South Wales.

== Primrose Colliery ==
Primrose Colliery was developed from the mid-1800s, close to the village of Rhos. After the disaster of 1853, it was redeveloped as the New Primrose Colliery, owned by Sir Ralph Howard, and by 1896 employed 307. It closed in the early 1900s, but from 1908 was revived as a pumping station for the Tarenni Colliery.

== Tirbach Slants ==
The major coal seams are located close beneath the valley floor, but mean accessing steeply declining seams which run in high geological fault structures, running directly under the River Tawe. This makes the coal easily accessible, but also dangerous to extract.

The first drift mine workings occurred in the late 1800s, at a site referred to at the time as the Tirbach Slants. The Pwllbach Colliery Company started development in 1898 of two slants, main and reverse, and after a series of lease changes which reverted the lease to the Pwllbach Colliery Company, production started in 1905. After the company collapsed into administration in 1924, the lease was taken over by the Pwllbach, Tirbach & Brynamman Anthracite Collieries Ltd, which in 1938 became Henderson's Welsh Anthracite Collieries Ltd.

These companies all worked the same seams: Big (abandoned 1939); Peacock (or Brass); Middle and Lower seams. The workings employed 651 in 1936, the height of its production. The site was closed from February 1940 due to geological difficulties, with 500 men given notice in January 1940. At this time during World War II, labour was expensive, so it is likely that economics also played a large part in the decision to close. The mine reopened in May of that year, but had been completely abandoned by December 1940.

The site then became a disposal centre for extract from the main Tarenni Colliery, and after nationalisation, the National Coal Board used it as a training site.

51.741447°N 3.808651°W
Opened in 1903 by the South Wales Primrose Coal Co Ltd, pit No.1 called Tarenni (143 yards (131 m)) was sunk to work the Red vein under Ynys Wil Hernyn Farm. A sister pit further north, Gleision (Tarenni No.2, 443 yards (405 m)), was sunk deeper to work the Big and Peacock veins, but faults made it difficult to work. There was a steep cross measure drift developed to connect the two shafts. Coal was distributed through access to either the Great Western Railway via the Neath and Brecon Railway, or the Midland Railway via the Swansea Vale Railway.

By 1908, Tarenni employed 427 men producing anthracite, which had grown to 803 by 1918, and 947 by 1923. By 1933, the mine was producing 140,000 tonnes per annum of anthracite. From 1937, the company started development workings to check the Big vein south, sinking the No.1 shaft to 576 yards (527 m). But development work stopped due to World War 2, and by 1938, there were a total of 522 men working the complex, with over two thirds deployed on No.1 shaft.

The Red vein workings in No.1 were abandoned in 1941, with a further reduction of 100 men achieved by reducing workings on the Big vein to one shift. The development work on No.1 shaft continued after the war, approved for an investment of £150,157 by the Ministry of Fuel and Power to access the Lower Peacock seam in a more stable area. Further investment was made by the purchase and refurbishment of a new 0-4-0WT shunting locomotive, formerly of the Great North of Scotland Railway.

But on nationalisation, the NCB concluded that the mine was uneconomic, and it was closed in February 1949 with the loss of 320 jobs.

== Gleision Colliery ==
51.7425°N 3.8016°W
Today, only the small Gleision Colliery /ˈɡleɪʃɒn/ drift mine exists, one of three privately owned coal mines still surviving in the South Wales Coalfield.

Working the same area as the Tirbach Slants, National Union of Mineworkers records suggest the development was active from 1962. The current workings of two drifts has been active from 1980, accessing the 2 feet 6 inches (0.76 m) Ynisarwed seam, with miners working the face by kneeling or lying down. The main drift of 250 metres (820 ft) provides access from a conveyor for a 2 ft (610 mm) gauge railway, on which up to six drams at a time are moved to two surface tipplers, from which the local council have authorised access for lorries of up to 15 tonnes in laden weight. The second drift does not have rail access, and provides air circulation and emergency ingress only.

Privatised in 1993, by 2001 seven men including the mine owner were working the drift, producing 200 tonnes/week. However, geological problems had resulted in the development of a deep and extensive sump system to remove water ingress, and frequent problems with gas.

== Disaster history ==
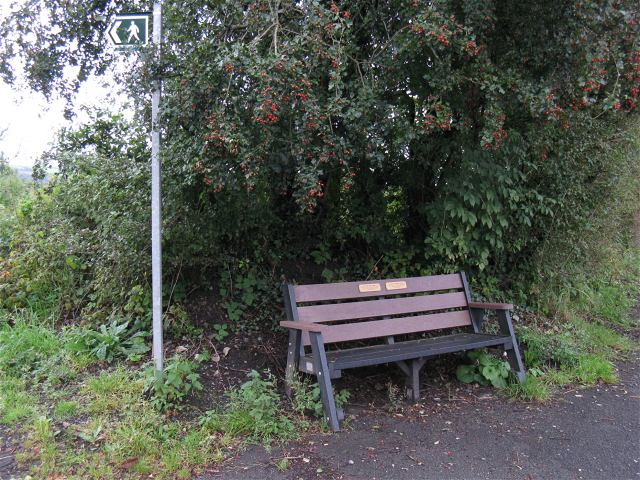
Bench in the village of Cilybebyll, in memorial for Primrose Colliery disaster of 1858, which claimed the lives of 14 miners (men and boys) and 7 horses

On 13 October 1858, when the Primrose Colliery was owned by Morgan and Lewis, fumes of an engine boiler suffocated 14 men and boys, and 7 horses.

According to HM Inspectorate of Mines and Quarries data, outside the Gwendraeth valley, Tarenni Colliery had the highest set of recorded incidents for coal damp and methane gas explosions. In total during its production lifetime, there were six outbursts in which three men lost their lives: one on 12 December 1914; two on 17 February 1941.

On 1 November 1909, water from the abandoned Ynysgeinon pit caused the death of five miners at Tarenni No.2.

=== 2011 disaster ===
On 15 September 2011, workings at the Gleision Colliery suffered a large ingress of water at 09:21. Three miners escaped to the surface, with one taken to Morriston Hospital. Mid and West Wales Fire and Rescue Service called Mines Rescue units in from across the United Kingdom, to rescue four miners located at a depth of 90 metres (300 ft) below the surface. On the afternoon of 16 September, South Wales Police confirmed the death of all four miners.
