= Cilybebyll =

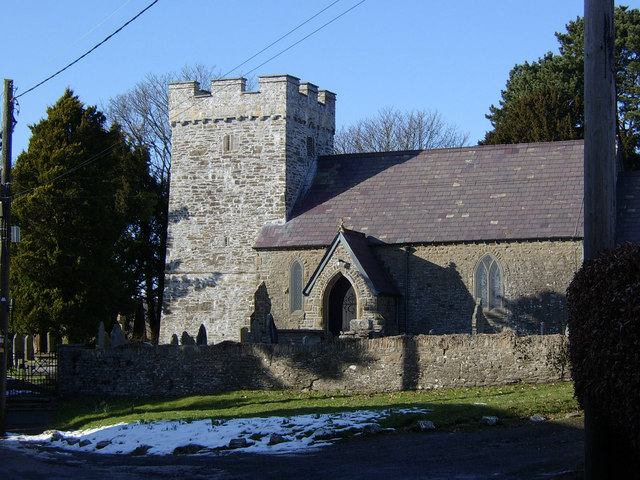
- The Church of St John the Evangelist, Cilybebyll

- Location within Neath Port Talbot
- Population: 4,769 (2011)
- OS grid reference: SN7404
- Community: Cilybebyll
- Principal area: Neath Port Talbot
- Preserved county: West Glamorgan
- Country: Wales
- Sovereign state: United Kingdom
- Post town: SWANSEA
- Postcode district: SA8
- Dialling code: 01792
- Police: South Wales
- Fire: Mid and West Wales
- Ambulance: Welsh
- UK Parliament: Brecon, Radnor and Cwm Tawe,
- Senedd Cymru – Welsh Parliament: Neath
- List of places UK Wales Neath Port Talbot 51.719°N 3.830°W Map of the community

Cilybebyll (/ˌkɪləˈbɛbɪl/) is a village and community in the Neath Port Talbot County Borough, Wales. It includes the villages of Alltwen, Fforest Gôch, Gellinudd and Rhos. The village is located 2 miles (3.2 km) east of Pontardawe, 5 miles (8.0 km) north of Neath and 10 miles (16 km) northeast of Swansea. The community has a population of 4,769 in 2011 census.

== Cilybebyll estate ==
The Cilybebyll estate was established in the 15th century, and after development by various families, by 1838 was recorded as having the largest land holding in the district. Plas Cilybebyll, the main house, was redeveloped in 1840 by Henry Leach, creating a south-facing Victorian facade on the property. His son Frances Edward Leach inherited the estate in 1848, changing his name to Lloyd in 1849 by Royal Charter in order not to forfeit his inheritance. The family remained in residence until the early 20th century when the family records were passed to the Swansea Museum. Plas Cilybebyll is now a guest house.

== Coal mining disasters ==
Like much of South Wales, small-scale coal mining has taken place in the area for many centuries. By 1849 it was producing large quantities of coal, which were readily transported around the world from the docks at Swansea. The dangers of coal mining past and present are highlighted by two disasters in the locality. In 1858, 14 men and boys died as a result of engine fumes being accidentally pumped into the Primrose Colliery. In 2008 the community council commemorated the 150th anniversary with a plaque on a park bench.

On 15 September 2011, water poured into the mine workings at Gleision Colliery, a small scale colliery which had expanded as the price of anthracite had risen. Three miners escaped to the surface, with one taken to Morriston Hospital. Units from the Mines Rescue Service were called in from across the country, to rescue four men located 300 feet (91 m) below the surface. Four bodies were subsequently found. Parallel inquiries into the causes of the disaster were launched by South Wales Police and the Health and Safety Executive.
