= Tom Jarvie =

Scottish footballer, veterinary surgeon, and television personality (1916-2011)

Personal information
- Full name: Thomas Jarvie
- Date of birth: 8 June 1916
- Place of birth: Glasgow, Scotland
- Date of death: 1 February 2011 (aged 94)
- Place of death: Crawley, England
- Position: Half back

Youth career
- 19xx–1935: Douglas Water Thistle

Senior career*
Years	Team	Apps	(Gls)
1935–1944	Hamilton Academical	72	(3)
1941	→ Rangers (war guest)		
1942–1943	→ Hibernian (war guest)		
1944	→ Falkirk (war guest)		
1944	→ Third Lanark (war guest)		

International career
1939	Scottish League XI	1	(0)

Managerial career
- 1950s: Crawley Town (player-manager)
- * Club domestic league appearances and goals

Thomas Jarvie (8 June 1916 – 1 February 2011) was a Scottish professional footballer, veterinary surgeon and television personality.

== Early and personal life ==
Born in Glasgow and raised in Douglas, South Lanarkshire, Jarvie was married with two sons.

== Football career ==
After beginning his career in Junior football with Douglas Water Thistle, before turning professional in 1935 with Hamilton Academical. Due to the disruptive effect that World War II had on football, Jarvie played a number of unofficial wartime games for Rangers, Hibernian, Falkirk and Third Lanark. During the 1950s he was player-manager of Crawley Town.

== Veterinary career ==
After graduating from the University of Glasgow with a degree in veterinary medicine, Jarvie moved to England to practice, where he was a colleague of James Herriot, author of the All Creatures Great and Small series of books. In fact, he was instrumental in Herriot's - real name James Alfred Wight - choice of pen name as he was told by publishers that he could not use his 'practising' name as an author. They chose the name after watching Jim Herriot (former Scotland goalkeeper) in action, as it had a nice ring to it. Jarvie also worked as a vet for TV show Blue Peter.
