= Deaths in February 2011 =

The following is a list of notable deaths in February 2011.

Entries for each day are listed alphabetically by surname. A typical entry lists information in the following sequence:

- Name, age, country of citizenship at birth, subsequent country of citizenship (if applicable), reason for notability, cause of death (if known), and reference.

== February 2011 ==
=== 1 ===
- Ernst Badian, 85, Austrian classical scholar and history professor (Harvard University), complications from a fall.
- Lennox Fyfe, Baron Fyfe of Fairfield, 69, British politician.
- Daniele Formica, 61, Irish-born Italian actor, theatre director and playwright, pancreatic cancer.
- Douglas Haig, 90, American child actor.
- Stanisław Michalski, 78, Polish actor.
- Derek Rawcliffe, 89, British Anglican prelate, Bishop of Glasgow and Galloway (1981–1991).
- Knut Risan, 80, Norwegian actor.
- Husik Santurjan, 91, Turkish-born Armenian archbishop of Armenian Apostolic Church.
- Les Stubbs, 81, British footballer.

=== 2 ===
- Geoff Ainsworth, 64, Australian football player, cancer.
- Edward Amy, 92, Canadian brigadier general.
- Ian Anderson, 57, British politician, brain tumour.
- Darrel Baldock, 72, Australian football player and coach, member of the Tasmanian House of Assembly (1972–1987) and Minister (1975–1982), stroke.
- Harriett Ball, 64, American educator, heart attack.
- Armando Chin Yong, 53, Malaysian opera singer, heart disease.
- Jimmy Fell, 75, British footballer (Grimsby Town).
- Bill Foster, 78, American television director (Benson, Full House, The Mystery of Al Capone's Vaults), cancer.
- Defne Joy Foster, 35, Turkish actress, presenter and VJ.
- Awal Gul, 48, Afghan detainee in Guantanamo Bay Detention Camp, heart attack.
- Douglas M. Head, 80, American politician, Minnesota Attorney General (1967–1971).
- Rodney Hill, 89, British mathematician.
- Clark Hulings, 88, American realist painter and physicist.
- Margaret John, 84, British actress (High Hopes, Gavin & Stacey, Game of Thrones), liver cancer.
- Durga Mukherjee, 77, Indian cricketer.
- Eric Nicol, 91, Canadian writer.
- René Verdon, 86, French-born American White House Executive Chef, leukemia.

=== 3 ===
- Ajib Ahmad, 63, Malaysian politician, Chief Minister of Johor (1982–1986).
- Édouard Glissant, 82, Martinican poet and writer.
- LeRoy Grannis, 93, American surfing photographer.
- Tony Levin, 71, British jazz drummer.
- Ron Piché, 75, Canadian baseball player (Atlanta Braves, St. Louis Cardinals), cancer.
- Maria Schneider, 58, French actress (Last Tango in Paris), cancer.
- Tatyana Shmyga, 82, Russian operetta singer and film actress (Hussar Ballad), People's Artist of the USSR, vascular disease.
- Machan Varghese, 50, Indian Malayalam film actor, cancer.
- Neil Young, 66, British footballer (Manchester City), cancer.
- Robert Young, 95, American Olympic silver medal-winning (1936) athlete.

=== 4 ===
- Lu Bain, 68, Canadian football player.
- Martial Célestin, 97, Haitian lawyer and diplomat, Prime Minister (1988).
- Woodie Fryman, 70, American baseball player (Detroit Tigers, Montreal Expos).
- Michael Habeck, 66, German actor, after short illness.
- Fred Hole, 75, English art director (Return of the Jedi, Aliens, Empire of the Sun).
- Dame Olga Lopes-Seale, 92, Guyanese-born Barbadian broadcaster and singer.
- Ahmed Mohamed Mahmoud, 37, Egyptian journalist, shot.
- Lena Nyman, 66, Swedish actress (I Am Curious (Yellow), I Am Curious (Blue), Autumn Sonata), cancer.
- Vasile Paraschiv, 82, Romanian political activist and dissident.
- Tura Satana, 72, American actress (Faster, Pussycat! Kill! Kill!), heart failure.
- Earl Irvin West, 90, American church historian.
- Lee Winfield, 64, American basketball player (Seattle SuperSonics, Buffalo Braves), colon cancer.

=== 5 ===
- Fanizani Akuda, 78, Zimbabwean sculptor.
- Omar Amiralay, 66, Syrian filmmaker, heart attack.
- Eugeniusz Czajka, 83, Polish Olympic field hockey player.
- Ruth H. Funk, 93, American LDS Church youth leader (The Church of Jesus Christ of Latter-day Saints).
- John Paul Getty III, 54, American heir and kidnapping victim, grandson of J. Paul Getty and father of Balthazar Getty, after long illness.
- Miriam Hansen, 61, American cinema scholar and professor (University of Chicago), cancer.
- Brian Jacques, 71, British fantasy author (Redwall), heart attack.
- Adjie Massaid, 43, Indonesian actor, under-23 national football team manager and politician, heart attack.
- Hiroko Nagata, 65, Japanese radical and murderer, vice-chairman of United Red Army.
- Donald Peterman, 79, American cinematographer (Flashdance, Men in Black, Cocoon), complications from myelodysplastic syndrome.
- Pertti Purhonen, 68, Finnish Olympic bronze medal-winning (1964) boxer, Alzheimer's disease.
- Martin Quigley Jr., 93, American publisher, spy and author.
- Peggy Rea, 89, American character actress (Grace Under Fire, The Dukes of Hazzard, Step by Step, The Waltons), heart failure.
- Charles E. Silberman, 86, American journalist and author (Criminal Violence, Criminal Justice), heart attack.
- Pavel Vondruška, 85, Czech conductor and actor, accidental fall.
- Albert Yator, 17, Kenyan long-distance runner, world junior steeplechase medallist, bronchopneumonia.

=== 6 ===
- Andrée Chedid, 90, Egyptian-born French poet and novelist.
- Isabelle Corey, 71, French film actress, cancer.
- Billy Gallier, 78, British footballer (Tamworth) and manager.
- Josefa Iloilo, 90, Fijian politician, President (2000–2006; 2007–2009).
- Gary Moore, 58, Irish rock guitarist and singer (Thin Lizzy), heart attack.
- William Morais, 19, Brazilian footballer (América-MG), shot.
- John Nisby, 74, American football player (Pittsburgh Steelers, Washington Redskins), pneumonia.
- Ken Olsen, 84, American engineer, co-founder of Digital Equipment Corporation.
- Aurel Smith, 95, Australian politician, member of the Victorian Legislative Assembly.
- James Watson, 59, British trumpeter, heart attack.

=== 7 ===
- Maria Altmann, 94, Austrian-born American art heiress, after long illness.
- Jerry Ames, 80, American tapdancer and choreographer.
- Peter Feteris, 58, Dutch footballer.
- Hysen Hakani, 78, Albanian screenwriter and director, directed first Albanian short film.
- Bobby Kuntz, 79, American CFL player (Toronto Argonauts, Hamilton Tiger-Cats), Parkinson's disease.
- Eric Parsons, 87, British footballer.
- Ralph Pöhland, 64, German Olympic skier.
- Frank Roberts, 65, Australian boxer, first Australian Aboriginal Olympian (1964), heart attack.

=== 8 ===
- Nick Arundel, 83, American journalist and publisher, pulmonary failure.
- Roza Baglanova, 89, Kazakh singer, People's Artist of the USSR.
- Luiz Bueno, 74, Brazilian race car driver, cancer.
- Elaine Crowley, 83, Irish author.
- Cliff Dapper, 91, American baseball player (Brooklyn Dodgers).
- Bradley C. Livezey, 56, American ornithologist, car accident.
- Tony Malinosky, 101, American baseball player (Brooklyn Dodgers).
- Marie-Rose Morel, 38, Belgian politician, cancer.
- Jorma Ojaharju, 72, Finnish author.
- Charles O. Perry, 81, American sculptor, stomach cancer.
- Angelo Reyes, 65, Filipino general and politician, suicide by gunshot.
- Cesare Rubini, 87, Italian basketball player and coach, water polo player.
- Donald S. Sanford, 92, American film and television writer (Midway).
- Marvin Sease, 64, American blues singer, pneumonia.
- Ferbent Shehu, 78, Albanian dancer and choreographer, heart attack.
- Eugenio Toussaint, 56, Mexican composer and jazz musician, heart attack.

=== 9 ===
- Olga de Angulo, 55, Colombian Olympic swimmer.
- Miltiadis Evert, 71, Greek politician and minister, Mayor of Athens (1987–1989) and President of New Democracy (1993–1997).
- Leroy R. Hassell Sr., 55, American jurist, Justice of the Virginia Supreme Court (since 1989) and Chief Justice (2003–2011).
- David Sánchez Juliao, 65, Colombian author.
- Jimmy Lemi Milla, 62, Southern Sudanese politician, shot.
- Alicia Pietri, 87, Venezuelan First Lady (1969–1974; 1994–1999), widow of President Rafael Caldera.

=== 10 ===
- Trevor Bailey, 87, British Test cricketer and BBC radio broadcaster (Test Match Special), house fire.
- Emory Bellard, 83, American college football coach (Texas A&M University, Mississippi State University), creator of wishbone offense, amyotrophic lateral sclerosis.
- Doug Davis, 66, American football player (Minnesota Vikings).
- Claus Helmut Drese, 88, German theatre and opera administrator.
- Saad el-Shazly, 88, Egyptian military leader.
- Michael Harsgor, 86, Israeli historian.
- Bill Justice, 97, American animator (Peter Pan, Bambi, Alice in Wonderland).
- Blanche Honegger Moyse, 101, American conductor.
- Oleg Lavrentiev, 84, Russian nuclear physicist.
- Jon Petrovich, 63, American journalist, executive at CNN, cancer.
- Sam Plank, 62, British radio broadcaster, cancer.
- Fred Speck, 63, Canadian ice hockey player (Detroit Red Wings).
- Lynne Walker, 54, British music and theatre critic, cancer.
- Józef Życiński, 62, Polish Roman Catholic prelate, Archbishop of Lublin (since 1997), myocardial infarction.

=== 11 ===
- Nubia Barahona, 10, American child abuse victim, beaten.
- Reynaldo de Barros, 79, Brazilian politician, mayor of São Paulo (1979–1982).
- Bad News Brown, 33, Canadian rapper and harmonica player, beaten and shot.
- Sir Arthur Bryan, 87, British businessman.
- Tom Carnegie, 91, American sports announcer (Indianapolis Motor Speedway).
- Bo Carpelan, 84, Finnish poet and author.
- John Clay, 86, English cricketer.
- Steve Dacri, 58, American magician, cancer.
- Joe R. Greenhill, 96, American attorney, Chief Justice of the Texas Supreme Court (1972–1982).
- Roy Gussow, 92, American sculptor (Infinity), heart attack.
- Gerry Huth, 77, American football player (New York Giants, Philadelphia Eagles, Minnesota Vikings).
- Christian J. Lambertsen, 93, American diving engineer, inventor of first SCUBA device, renal failure.
- Earle Morris Jr., 82, American politician, Lieutenant Governor of South Carolina (1971–1975).
- Josef Pirrung, 61, German footballer, cancer.
- Chuck Tanner, 82, American baseball manager (Chicago White Sox, Pittsburgh Pirates) and player (Los Angeles Dodgers), after long illness.

=== 12 ===
- Peter Alexander, 84, Austrian actor and singer.
- Kevin Barry Sr., 74, New Zealand boxing coach, after long illness.
- Gino Cimoli, 81, American baseball player (Brooklyn Dodgers, Pittsburgh Pirates), heart and kidney complications.
- Mato Damjanović, 83, Croatian chess grandmaster.
- Hal Dean, 89, American football player (Los Angeles Rams).
- Ernesto De Pascale, 52, Italian music promoter, producer and critic.
- Mark C. Ebersole, 89, American educator.
- James Elliott, 82, British-born Australian actor (Number 96), Lewy body dementia.
- Betty Garrett, 91, American actress, singer and dancer (On the Town, All in the Family, Laverne & Shirley), aortic aneurysm.
- Fedor den Hertog, 64, Dutch cyclist and Olympic medallist, prostate cancer.
- Andrzej Kłopotowski, 75, Polish Olympic swimmer.
- Konstantinos Kosmopoulos, 83, Greek politician, Mayor of Thessaloniki (1989–1999).
- Kenneth Mars, 75, American actor (Young Frankenstein, The Producers, The Little Mermaid), pancreatic cancer.
- John Monson, 11th Baron Monson, 78, British aristocrat and politician, head injuries following a fall.
- Kyllikki Naukkarinen, 85, Finnish Olympic hurdler
- Saleh Abdul Aziz Al Rajhi, 90, Saudi Arabian businessman, founder of Al-Rajhi Bank, heart attack.
- Joanne Siegel, 93, American widow of Superman co-creator Jerry Siegel, reported model for the character of Lois Lane.
- Vipindas, 72, Indian cinematographer and director, short illness.
- Frank Whitten, 68, New Zealand actor (Outrageous Fortune), cancer.

=== 13 ===
- Arnfinn Bergmann, 82, Norwegian ski jumper and Olympic champion, after brief illness.
- Bustanil Arifin, 85, Indonesian politician.
- Manuel Esperón, 99, Mexican composer and actor.
- Louis Grisius, 74, Luxembourgish Olympic cyclist.
- Oakley Hall III, 60, American playwright, heart attack.
- Dona Hardy, 98, American actress (The Truman Show, When Harry Met Sally..., Superbad).
- Inese Jaunzeme, 78, Latvian javelin thrower and Olympic gold medalist (1956 Melbourne).
- Nobutoshi Kihara, 84, Japanese electronics engineer for Sony.
- Paul Marcus, 56, British television producer, cancer.
- T. P. McKenna, 81, Irish actor (The Avengers, Doctor Who).
- Brian Shaw, 79/80, British rugby league player.
- Shi Yafeng, 91, Chinese geologist.

=== 14 ===
- Sean Boru, 57, Irish actor and author.
- Paul Briggs, 90, American football player (Detroit Lions).
- Tommy Burns, 88, Australian boxer.
- David F. Friedman, 87, American film producer (Blood Feast), heart failure.
- Cecil Kaiser, 94, American Negro league baseball player, injuries from a fall.
- Catherine Clark Kroeger, 85, American author, professor and New Testament scholar, Pneumonia.
- Ali Abdulhadi Mushaima, 21, Bahraini protester, gunshot.
- Peter Pilkington, Baron Pilkington of Oxenford, 77, British academic and life peer, Chairman of the BCC (1992–1996).
- Sir George Shearing, 91, British-born American jazz pianist (Lullaby of Birdland), heart failure.
- John Strauss, 90, American film and television composer (Car 54, Where Are You?), Parkinson's disease.

=== 15 ===
- Liliane Atlan, 79, French Jewish writer, cancer.
- Dame Judith Binney, 70, New Zealand historian and author.
- Charles Epstein, 77, American geneticist and Unabomber victim, pancreatic cancer.
- Joe Frazier, 88, American baseball player (St. Louis Cardinals) and manager (New York Mets).
- Dorian Gray, 83, Italian actress, suicide by gunshot.
- Sidney Harth, 85, American violinist and conductor, respiratory complications.
- Olavi Manninen, 82, Finnish Olympic runner.
- George Marsaglia, 87, American mathematician and computer scientist. developed diehard tests, heart attack.
- Fadhel Al-Matrook, 31, Bahraini protester, gunshot.
- François Nourissier, 83, French journalist and writer, complications from Parkinson's disease.
- Frank Nyangweso, 71, Ugandan Olympic boxer.
- Cyril Stein, 82, British businessman.

=== 16 ===
- Hans Joachim Alpers, 67, German writer and editor of science fiction and fantasy.
- Neal Amundson, 95, American chemical engineer.
- William A. Bablitch, 69, American politician, Wisconsin State Senator (1983–2003) and Wisconsin Supreme Court Justice (1983–2002).
- Alfred Burke, 92, British actor (Public Eye, Enemy at the Door), chest infection.
- Jack Calfee, 69, American economist and author, heart attack.
- Tonny van Ede, 86, Dutch football player (Sparta Rotterdam).
- Len Lesser, 88, American actor (Seinfeld, Everybody Loves Raymond, Kelly's Heroes), cancer-related pneumonia.
- Justinas Marcinkevičius, 80, Lithuanian poet and playwright.
- Santi Santamaria, 53, Spanish chef, heart attack.
- David Shapiro, 58, American jazz musician, atherosclerotic cardiovascular disease.
- Tu Jida, 83, Chinese aircraft designer (Nanchang CJ-6, Shenyang J-5A, Chengdu JJ-5, Chengdu J-7).

=== 17 ===
- Hilal Al-Ahmadi, 56–57, Iraqi journalist, shot.
- John Stanley Beard, 95, British-born Australian forester and ecologist.
- Ricky Bell, 36, American football player (Chicago Bears, Jacksonville Jaguars, Winnipeg Blue Bombers).
- George Clarke, 89, British footballer (Ipswich Town).
- Dave Duerson, 50, American football player (Chicago Bears, Phoenix Cardinals, New York Giants), suicide by gunshot.
- Francis Anthony Gomes, 79, Bangladeshi Roman Catholic prelate, Bishop of Mymensingh (1987–2006).
- Ron Hickman, 78, South African-born British inventor (Black & Decker Workmate, Lotus Elan).
- Steve Horn, 79, American politician, U.S. Representative from California (1993–2003), complications from Alzheimer's disease.
- Augustine Hu Daguo, 88, Chinese Roman Catholic underground bishop of Guiyang.
- George Lewis, 93, Trinidad and Tobago Olympic track and field athlete.
- James McLure, 59, American playwright.
- Michelle Monkhouse, 19, Canadian fashion model, car accident.
- Bill Monroe, 90, American journalist, host of Meet the Press (1975–1984), complications from hypertension.
- Perry Moore, 39, American author (Hero) and film producer (The Chronicles of Narnia), apparent drug overdose.
- Vivien Noakes, 74, British literary critic, cancer.
- Gustave Olombe Atelumbu Musilamu, 83, Congolese Roman Catholic prelate, Bishop of Wamba (1968–1990).

=== 18 ===
- Paulo de Tarso Alvim, 91–92, Brazilian biologist.
- Cayle Chernin, 63, Canadian actress (Goin' Down the Road), cancer.
- Chloe Dzubilo, 50, American artist, musician and activist.
- John M. Falcone, 44, American police officer Poughkeepsie, New York, shot.
- Len Gilmore, 93, American baseball player (Pittsburgh Pirates).
- Spook Jacobs, 85, American baseball player (Philadelphia Athletics/Kansas City Athletics, Pittsburgh Pirates).
- Catherine Jourdan, 62, French actress, pulmonary embolism.
- Buddy Lewis, 94, American baseball player (Washington Senators), cancer.
- Abdost Rind, 27, Pakistani journalist, shot.
- Walter Seltzer, 96, American film producer (Soylent Green, The Omega Man, The Last Hard Men).
- Marshall Stoneham, 70, British physicist, complications of surgery.
- Bob Tanna, c. 96, Indian amateur radio operator.
- Tykhon Zhylyakov, 42, Ukrainian Orthodox Bishop of Kremenchuk and Lubny (since 2009).

=== 19 ===
- Suresh Babu, 58, Indian Olympic athlete, cirrhosis.
- Florinda Chico, 84, Spanish actress, respiratory disease.
- Norman Corner, 68, British footballer.
- Donald L. Cox, 74, American leader of the Black Panther Party.
- Ollie Matson, 80, American Hall of Fame football player (St. Louis Rams, Philadelphia Eagles), complications from dementia.
- Anson Rainey, 81, American academic and author, pancreatic cancer.
- Ernő Solymosi, 70, Hungarian Olympic bronze medal-winning (1960) football player.
- Dietrich Stobbe, 72, German politician, Mayor of West Berlin (1977–1981).
- David R. Thompson, 80, American federal judge.
- Max Wilk, 90, American playwright, screenwriter and author.
- Richard L. Williams, 87, American jurist, senior District Judge for the Eastern District of Virginia (1980–2011).
- Yuan Xuefen, 88, Chinese Yue opera actress.

=== 20 ===
- Ted Bates, 84, American politician.
- Drew Baur, 66, American banker, co-owner of the St. Louis Cardinals, heart attack.
- Eddie Brandt, 90, American composer and songwriter.
- Raphaël Bretton, 91, French set decorator (Hello, Dolly!, The Towering Inferno, The Poseidon Adventure), Oscar winner (1970).
- Barbara Harmer, 57, British aviator, first female Concorde pilot, cancer.
- Betty Hicks, 90, American golfer (LPGA Tour), Alzheimer's disease.
- Troy Jackson, 38, American basketball player (AND1 Mixtape Tour).
- Tony Kellow, 58, British footballer (Exeter City).
- Jay Landesman, 91, American publisher, writer and nightclub proprietor, husband of Fran Landesman.
- Frank A. McClintock, 90, American mechanical engineer.
- Sir Fred Phillips, 92, Kittitian politician, Administrator (1966–1967) and Governor of Saint Christopher-Nevis-Anguilla (1967–1969).
- Helmut Ringelmann, 84, German film and television producer, organ failure.
- Noemí Simonetto de Portela, 85, Argentine Olympic silver medal-winning (1948) athlete.
- Malaysia Vasudevan, 66, Indian actor and playback singer, heart failure.
- Mehdi Mohammed Zeyo, 49, Libyan activist, explosion.

=== 21 ===
- Robert Albo, 78, American physician, surgeon and amateur illusionist.
- Odón Alonso, 85, Spanish conductor and composer.
- Jean Baeza, 68, French footballer.
- Wolfgang Baumgart, 61, German hockey player.
- Bob Boyd, 55, American professional golfer, leukemia.
- Ben Fricke, 35, American football player (Dallas Cowboys), colon cancer.
- Edwin D. Kilbourne, 90, American research scientist and influenza vaccine expert.
- Dick Klugman, 87, Australian politician, member of the House of Representatives (1969–1990).
- Anne Mathams, 97, Scottish education and disability campaigner.
- Dwayne McDuffie, 49, American comic book writer (Static, Damage Control) and television writer (Justice League), complications following heart surgery.
- Bernard Nathanson, 84, American pro-choice activist and co-founder of NARAL, later anti-abortion activist and writer, cancer.
- Jerzy Nowosielski, 88, Polish painter, graphic artist, scenographer and illustrator.
- Russell W. Peterson, 94, American politician, Governor of Delaware (1969–1973), stroke.
- Kenneth Pillar, 86, British Anglican prelate, Bishop of Hertford (1982–1989).
- Aranmula Ponnamma, 96, Indian actress.
- Swami Premananda, 59, Sri Lankan-born Indian religious leader, convicted rapist and murderer.
- Haila Stoddard, 97, American actress and Broadway producer.
- Judith Sulzberger, 87, American physician, pancreatic cancer.
- Antonín Švorc, 77, Czech operatic bass-baritone.

=== 22 ===
- Kjell Bjartveit, 83, Norwegian physician and politician.
- Brian Bonsor, 84, Scottish composer and music teacher.
- George Buksar, 84, American football player (Chicago Hornets, Washington Redskins).
- Nicholas Courtney, 81, British actor (Doctor Who, Then Churchill Said to Me, Bullseye!).
- Bill Deck, 95, American Negro league baseball player.
- Beau Dollar, 69, American singer and drummer, long illness.
- Jean Dinning, 86, American songwriter ("Teen Angel").
- Chari Gómez Miranda, 80, Spanish journalist and television presenter.
- Ion Hobana, 80, Romanian science fiction author.
- Jud McAtee, 91, Canadian-born American ice hockey player (Detroit Red Wings, Chicago Blackhawks).
- James R. McCartney, 90, American politician, Secretary of State of West Virginia (1975–1977).
- Bill Nimmo, 93, American radio and television announcer (Who Do You Trust?, The Jackie Gleason Show) and game show host (Keep It in the Family).
- Ivo Pavelić, 103, Croatian footballer and Olympic swimmer.
- Notable New Zealanders killed in the 2011 Christchurch earthquake:
  - Jo Giles, 61, television personality and sportswoman
  - Amanda Hooper, 30, field hockey representative

=== 23 ===
- Matthew Carr, 57, British figurative artist, leukaemia.
- James Damman, 78, American politician, Lieutenant Governor of Michigan (1975–1979), cancer.
- Joseph Flom, 87, American corporate lawyer, heart failure.
- Rebekah Johansson, 29, Swedish model, apparent suicide.
- Gustav Just, 89, German journalist and politician.
- Jean Lartéguy, 90, French soldier, war correspondent and writer.
- Frank Prout, 89, British Olympic sprint canoer and businessman.
- Nirmala Srivastava, 87, Indian spiritual leader, founder of Sahaja Yoga religious movement.
- Mike Zimring, 94, American radio actor and theatrical agent.

=== 24 ===
- Margaret Hope Bacon, 89, American Quaker historian, author and lecturer.
- Yozhef Betsa, 81, Ukrainian Olympic gold medal-winning (1956) footballer.
- Jerrold Kessel, 66, South African-born Israeli journalist (CNN), cancer.
- Anant Pai, 81, Indian educator and comics creator (Amar Chitra Katha).
- Mullapudi Venkata Ramana, 80, Indian Telugu screenplay writer.
- Robert Reguly, 80, Canadian journalist (Toronto Star), heart disease.
- Attila Takács, 82, Hungarian Olympic gymnast.
- Harry Walsh, 97, Canadian lawyer, complications from a fall.
- Jens Winther, 50, Danish jazz trumpet player, stroke.
- A. Wayne Wymore, 84, American mathematician and systems engineer.

=== 25 ===
- Isidora Aguirre, 91, Chilean writer, internal hemorrhage.
- Kamil Altan, 86, Turkish footballer.
- Frank Bare Sr., 80, American gymnast.
- John Thomas Chambers Jr., 82, American politician, only African-American Mayor of Annapolis (1981), heart attack.
- Rick Coonce, 64, American drummer (The Grass Roots).
- Aminath Faiza, 86, Maldivian poet and author.
- Emanuel Fried, 97, American playwright and actor.
- Peter Hildreth, 82, British Olympic hurdler, 1950 European Championships medalist.
- István Jenei, 57, Hungarian Olympic sports shooter.
- John Miner, 92, American attorney, prosecutor responsible for investigating the death of Marilyn Monroe.
- Richard J. Naughton, 64, American vice admiral, Superintendent of the U.S. Naval Academy (2002–2003).
- Eneas Perdomo, 80, Venezuelan folk singer.
- Suze Rotolo, 67, American artist, lung cancer.
- Carola Scarpa, 39, Brazilian socialite, multiple organ failure.

=== 26 ===
- Abbas Amiri Moghaddam, 67, Iranian actor, car accident.
- Konstantinos Andriopoulos, 26, Greek footballer (PAOK, Veria), leukemia.
- María Azambuya, 66, Uruguayan actress and theatre director.
- Judith Coplon, 89, American political analyst, convicted of espionage.
- Susan Crosland, 84, American journalist, widow of Anthony Crosland.
- Richard F. Daines, 60, American physician, Commissioner of the New York State Department of Health (2007–2010).
- Jon Fitch, 60, American politician, Arkansas State Representative (1979–1983) and State Senator (1983–2002), complications from a stroke.
- Eugene Fodor, 60, American violinist, cirrhosis.
- Ed Frutig, 92, American football player (Green Bay Packers, Detroit Lions).
- Greg Goossen, 65, American baseball player (New York Mets) and actor (Wyatt Earp, Unforgiven).
- Bill Grigsby, 89, American radio sportscaster (Kansas City Chiefs), prostate cancer and fall.
- Cynthia Holcomb Hall, 82, American circuit judge for the Court of Appeals for the Ninth Circuit (1984–1997), cancer.
- Shawn Lee, 44, American football player (Miami Dolphins, Chicago Bears).
- Arnošt Lustig, 84, Czech writer and Holocaust survivor, cancer.
- James A. McClure, 86, American politician, U.S. Representative (1967–1973) and Senator from Idaho (1973–1991), following multiple strokes.
- Dean Richards, 36, British footballer (Bradford City, Wolverhampton, Southampton, Tottenham).
- Jorge Santoro, 66, Brazilian footballer, heart attack.
- Roch Thériault, 63, Canadian cult leader and convicted murderer, murdered in prison.
- Mark Tulin, 62, American bass player (The Electric Prunes, The Smashing Pumpkins), heart attack.
- Zhu Guangya, 86, Chinese nuclear physicist, helped develop nation's first atomic bomb.

=== 27 ===
- Frank Alesia, 67, American actor and director (Pajama Party, Riot on Sunset Strip, C'mon, Let's Live a Little).
- Frank Buckles, 110, American supercentenarian soldier, last living U.S. World War I veteran.
- J. Elliot Cameron, 88, American educator and religious leader.
- Margaret Eliot, 97, British music teacher and musician.
- Necmettin Erbakan, 84, Turkish politician, Prime Minister (1996–1997).
- James Gruber, 82, American teacher and early gay rights activist, last surviving member of the Mattachine Society.
- Maurice Guigue, 98, French football referee (1958 FIFA World Cup Final).
- Eddie Kirkland, 88, American blues guitarist, car accident.
- Oto Mádr, 94, Czech theologian and dissident.
- Amparo Muñoz, 56, Spanish actress, Miss Universe 1974.
- Skonk Nicholson, 94, South African teacher and rugby union coach (Maritzburg College, 1948–1982).
- Emerson Rodwell, 89, Australian cricketer and soldier.
- Moacyr Scliar, 73, Brazilian physician and writer, stroke.
- Duke Snider, 84, American Hall of Fame baseball player (Brooklyn/Los Angeles Dodgers, New York Mets, San Francisco Giants).
- Gary Winick, 49, American film director (13 Going on 30, Letters to Juliet, Charlotte's Web), brain cancer.

=== 28 ===
- Donald E. Allured, 88, American handbell choir director, composer, and arranger
- Netiva Ben-Yehuda, 82, Israeli author and radio personality.
- Scott Cary, 87, American baseball player (Washington Senators).
- Harvey Dorfman, 75, American sports psychologist.
- Ernest Eastman, 83, Liberian diplomat, Foreign Minister (1983–1986), Secretary General of the Mano River Union.
- John Ellis, 72, British trade unionist.
- Emmy, 21, Albanian singer, vehicular homicide.
- Annie Girardot, 79, French actress, Alzheimer's disease.
- Peter J. Gomes, 69, American preacher, theologian and author, professor at Harvard Divinity School, brain aneurysm and heart attack.
- Stan Holmes, 51, American baseball player, cancer.
- Nick LaTour, 82, American singer and actor (Jingle All The Way, Don Juan DeMarco, Deep Cover), complications from cancer.
- Jozef Massy, 96, Belgian Olympic sprint canoer.
- Günter Mast, 84, German businessman (Jägermeister).
- Aracy de Carvalho Guimarães Rosa, 102, Brazilian diplomatic clerk.
- Jane Russell, 89, American actress (The Outlaw, Gentlemen Prefer Blondes, The Las Vegas Story), respiratory illness.
- Jan van Schijndel, 83, Dutch footballer (1952 Summer Olympics).
- Allan Williams, 88, Canadian politician, Attorney General of British Columbia (1979–1983), after long illness.
- Wally Yonamine, 85, American baseball (Yomiuri Giants, Chunichi Dragons) and football player (San Francisco 49ers), prostate cancer.
- Doyald Young, 84, American logotype designer, complications of heart surgery.
