= Calfee =

Calfee may refer to:

- Carolyn Calfee (born 1974), American intensive care physician
- Jack Calfee (1941–2011), American economist and author
- Kent Calfee (born 1949), American politician
- Robert C. Calfee (1933–2014), American educational psychologist
- Calfee Design, California designer and manufacturer of carbon fiber bicycle frames by Craig Calfee
- Calfee Park, a stadium in Pulaski, Virginia, used primarily for baseball
- Calfee Nunatak, a geographical feature in Antarctica
