= Relay Graduate School of Education =

Private school in New York City, New York, US

Coordinates: 40.74046°N 73.99325°W

- Type: Private graduate school for teachers
- Established: 2011
- President: Mayme Hostetter
- Students: 5000
- Location: New York City, New York, United States
- Campus: Urban
- Language: English
- Website: relay.edu

Relay Graduate School of Education is a private graduate school for teachers in New York City and other locations in the United States including Atlanta, Baton Rouge, Chicago, Connecticut, Delaware, Denver, Houston, Indiana, Memphis, Nashville, New Orleans, Newark, Philadelphia, Camden, and San Antonio.

It was established in 2011 by three charter school networks: KIPP, Achievement First, and Uncommon Schools. It was spun off from Hunter College's Teacher U program. Teacher U CEO Norman Atkins was chosen as the graduate school's president, a position he held until 2018.

Along with the Bank Street College of Education, it is one of only two stand alone graduate schools of education in New York State.

Primarily, the school serves charter school and district teachers. There was opposition to the school's establishment from some of New York's existing universities that offer teacher education programs.

On September 7, 2013, Relay GSE held the commencement ceremony for its first graduating class of students on Pier 60 at Chelsea Piers in New York City.
