= Husik =

Husik is a name of Armenian origin, that may refer to:

- Husik Santurjan (1920–2011), Armenian archbishop
- Isaac Husik (1876–1939) American writer
- Lida Husik (born 1963), American musician
- St. Husik I (died 347), Armenian religious leader
