= Senator Fitch (disambiguation) =

Graham N. Fitch (1809–1892) was a U.S. Senator from Indiana from 1857 to 1861. Senator Fitch may also refer to:

- George Fitch (Wisconsin politician) (1848–1896), Wisconsin State Senate
- Jon Fitch (politician) (1950–2011), Arkansas State Senate
- Toby Fitch (born 1946), North Carolina State Senate
