= First Battle of Benghazi =

2011 battle of the Libyan Civil War

Coordinates: 32.1167°N 20.0667°E

- Part of Libyan Civil War
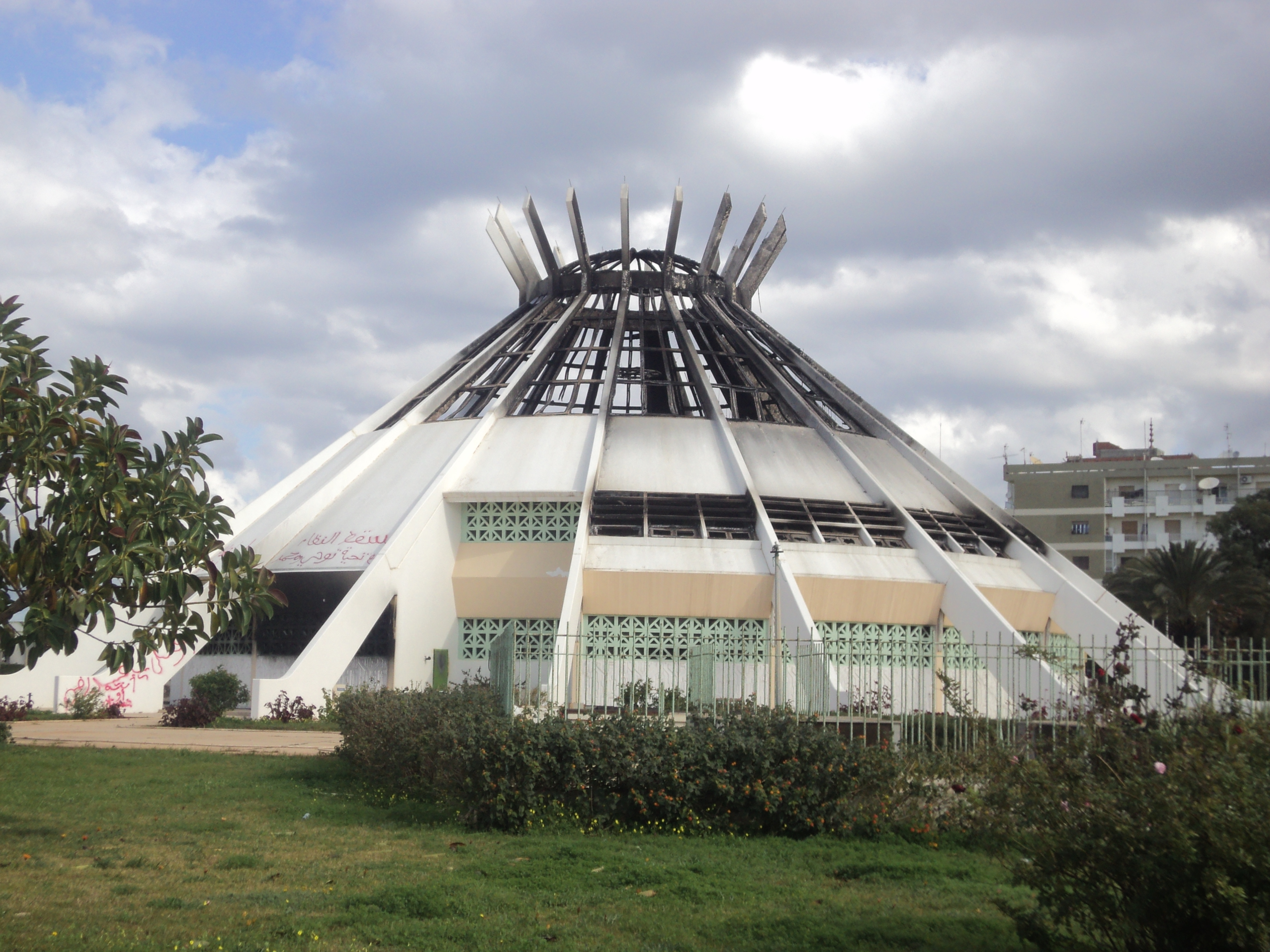
- A downtown Benghazi government revolutionary committee office after it was torched by demonstrators.
Date	15–20 February 2011
Location	Benghazi, Bayda, Derna, Libya
Result	Decisive Anti-Gaddafi victory; Beginning of the Libyan Civil War; Benghazi becomes a core of the Anti-Gaddafi forces

Belligerents
(Libya) Anti-Gaddafi forces; Defected army units; Armed protesters	(Libya) Libyan Arab Jamahiriya

Commanders and leaders
(Libya) Abdul Fatah Younis (last day)	(Libya) Al-Saadi Gaddafi

Strength
10,000	Khamis Brigade; Fadheel Brigade; Tariq Brigade; 325 mercenaries

Casualties and losses
Benghazi: 110–257 killed 9 missing Bayda: 63 killed Derna: 29 killed Rebel soldiers: 130 killed Total: 332–479 killed 9 missing 3 T-54/55 tanks or IFVs destroyed	163 killed 236 captured 3 T-54/55 tanks or IFVs destroyed

The First Battle of Benghazi was fought between army units and militiamen loyal to Libyan leader Muammar Gaddafi and anti-Gaddafi forces in February 2011 during the Libyan Civil War. The battle mainly took place in Benghazi, the second-largest city in Libya, with related clashes occurring in the nearby Cyrenaican cities of Bayda and Derna. In Benghazi itself most of the fighting occurred during a siege of the government-controlled Katiba compound.

== Beginning ==
The fighting in Benghazi started on 17 February, after two days of protests in the city. Security forces opened fire on protesters, killing 14. The next day, a funeral procession for one of those killed passed the Katiba compound. Accounts differ on whether mourners began throwing stones first or the soldiers from Katiba opened fire without provocation. In the end, another 24 people from the opposition protesters were killed. Following the massacre, two policemen, who were accused of shooting the protestors, were hanged by the opposition. Police and army personnel later withdrew from the city after being overwhelmed by protesters. Some army personnel joined the protesters and helped them seize the local state-controlled radio station. In Bayda, unconfirmed reports indicated that local police and riot control units joined the protesters. Two days earlier, on 16 February, it was also reported that Islamist gunmen, with the help of a defecting army colonel, stormed an arms depot in Derna and seized 250 weapons and an assortment of 70 military vehicles. During the raid four soldiers were killed and 16 were wounded. By the end of 18 February, the only place that still housed a significant number of Gaddafi loyalists in Benghazi was the Katiba compound.

On 19 February, another funeral procession passed the Katiba compound en route to the cemetery in an act of defiance and were again fired upon by Gaddafi loyalists in the compound. By this time, some 325 mercenaries from southern Africa were flown into Benghazi and other towns in the east to help restore order. During 18 and 19 February, there were major retaliatory attacks by the opposition forces against the mercenaries. 50 of them were executed by the protesters in Bayda. Some died when protestors burned down the police station in which they were locked up and 15 were lynched in front of the courthouse in Bayda.

Following the second attack on a funeral, opposition forces commandeered bulldozers and tried to breach the walls of the Katiba compound, often retreating under heavy fire. As the fighting continued, a mob attacked a local army base on the outskirts of Benghazi and forced the soldiers to give up their weapons, including three small tanks. Opposition members then rammed these tanks into the Katiba compound's walls. Days later, the burnt-out hulks of the armored vehicles could still be seen, stuck halfway into the breaches they had made.

== End ==
The fighting stopped on the morning of 20 February. Another 30 people were killed during the previous 24 hours of fighting. A third funeral procession passed the Katiba compound. Under the cover of the funeral, a suicide car-bomber attacked the compound's gates, blowing them up. Opposition fighters resumed their assault on the base, this time with reinforcements from Bayda and Derna. During the final attack on the compound, 42 people were killed. The gate was blown open by a Mehdi Mohammed Zeyo, a 48-year-old man, who had fashioned two gas canisters into the boot of his car, and drove into the main gate. The compound was taken by opposition forces hours later. In the afternoon, Libyan Interior Minister Abdul Fatah Younis showed up with a special forces squad called the "Thunderbolt" to relieve the besieged barracks. Troops from his unit, based on the outskirts of town, arrived at the opposite side of the Katiba compound armed with machine guns and driving trucks mounted with anti-aircraft guns. Two tanks under Younis's command followed. However, Younis defected to the opposition and granted safe passage to Gaddafi's loyalists out of the city. Gaddafi's troops evacuated, but not before killing soldiers who refused to open fire on the opposition. Some 130 rebel soldiers were killed in Benghazi and Bayda.

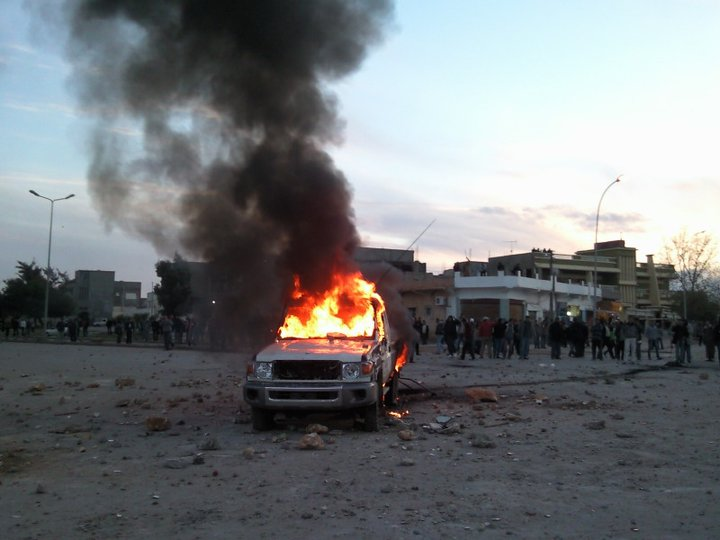
First demonstrations calling for the downfall of the regime in Bayda, Libya. During the demonstration, burning a police car, at the crossroads of At-Talhi, now known as the crossroads of the spark, on 16 February 2011

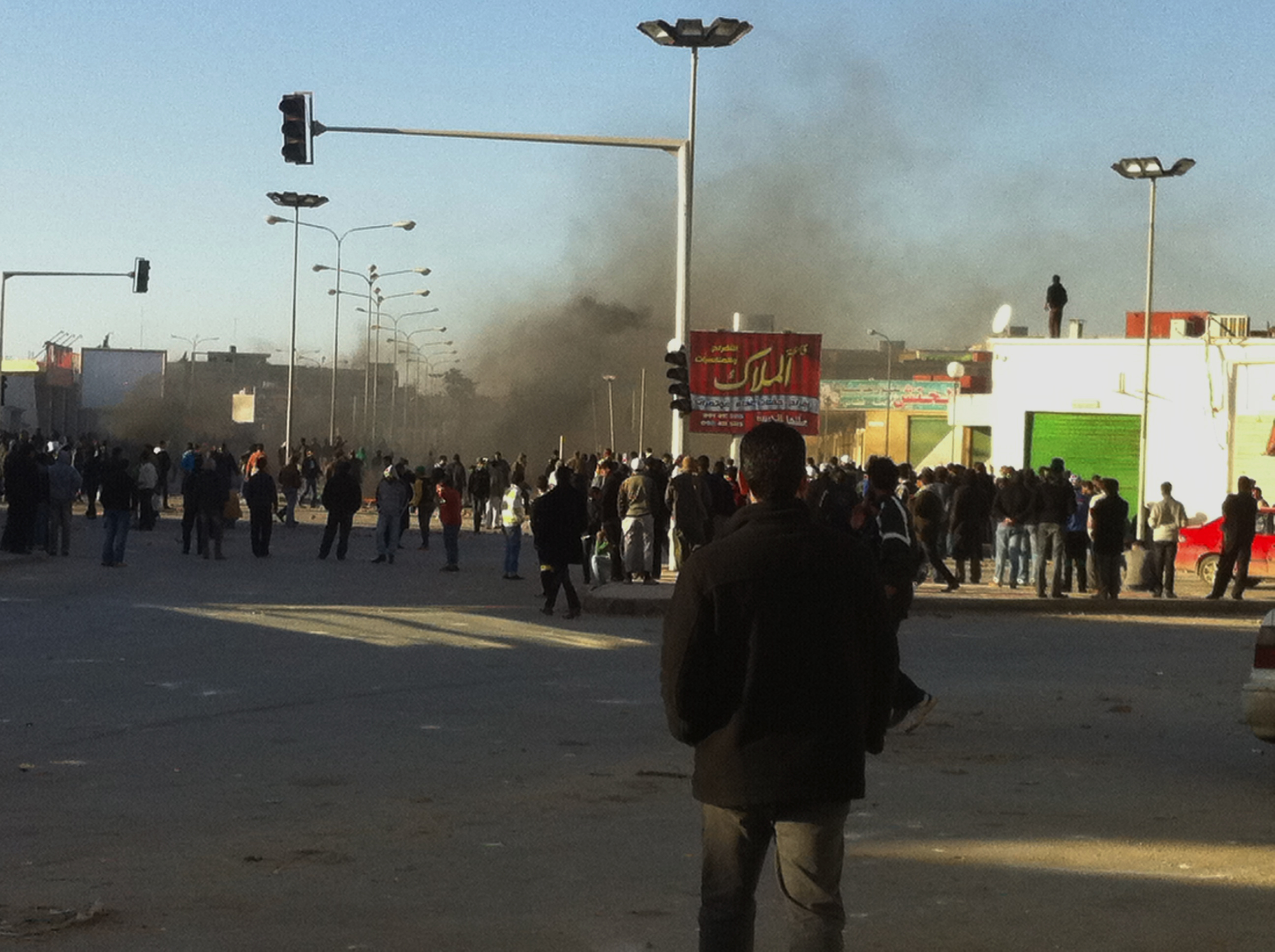
Confrontations between anti-Gaddafi and pro-Gaddafi forces in Bayda, on 17 February 2011

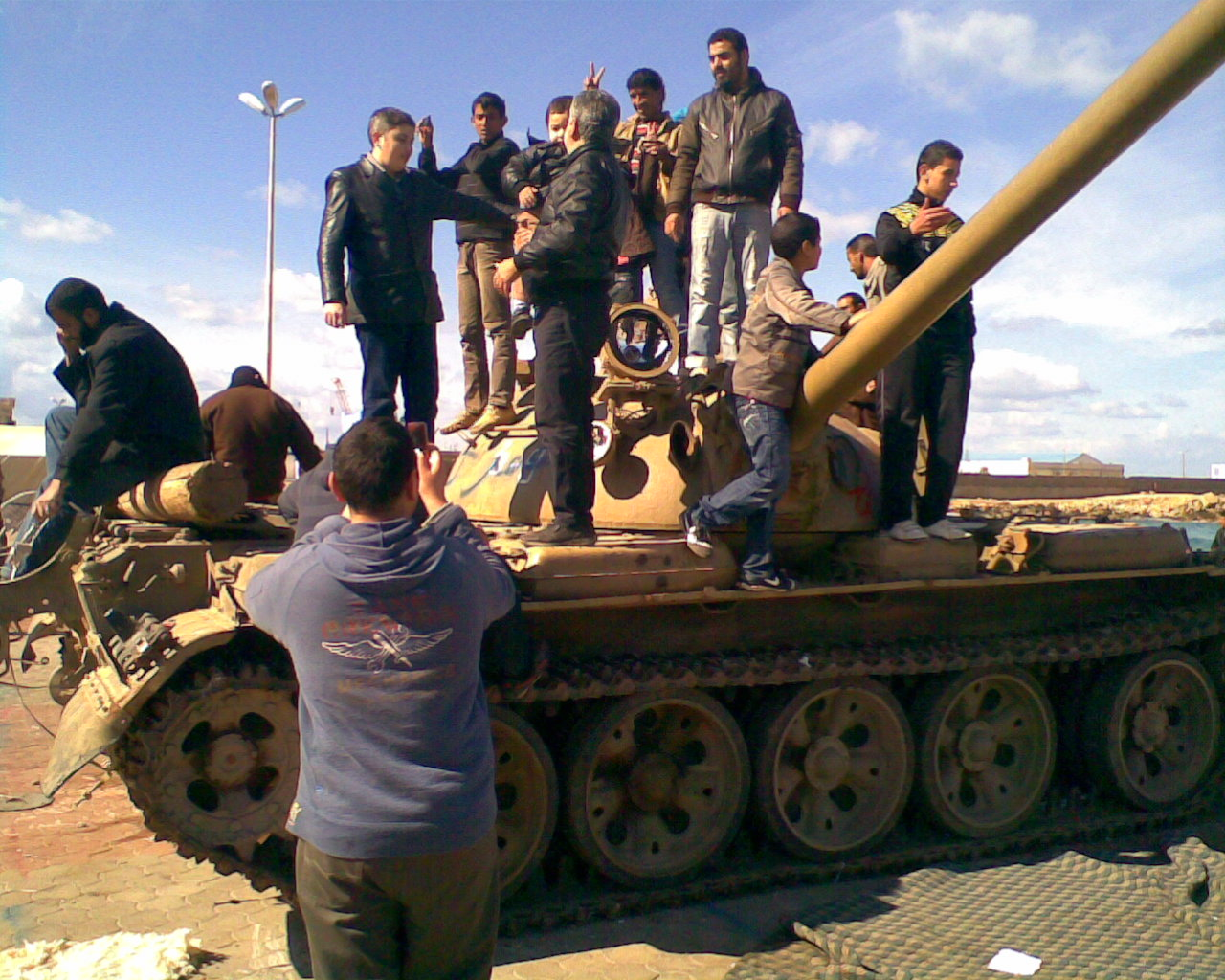
People on a tank in a Benghazi rally, 23 February 2011

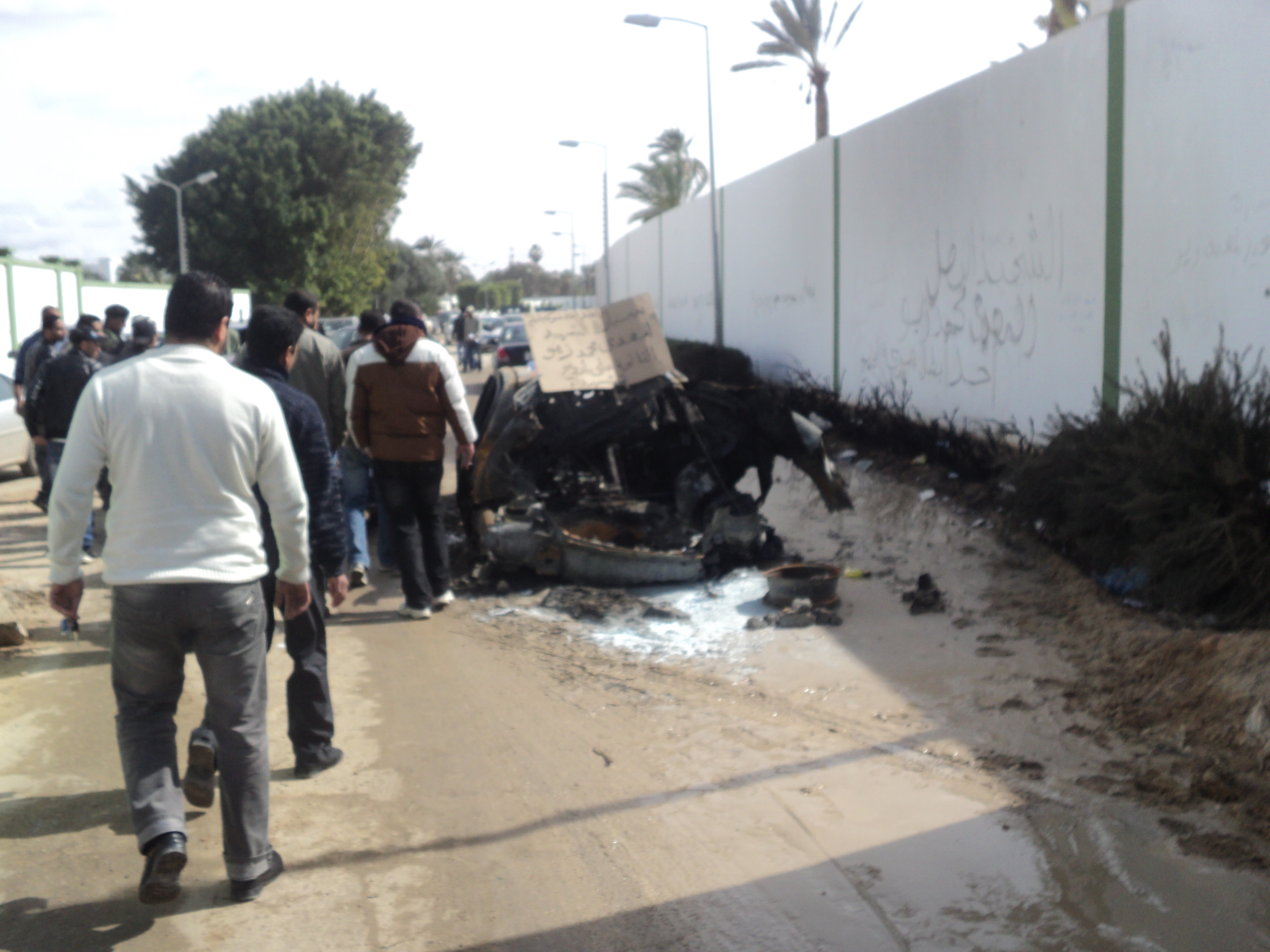
Demonstrators inside the al Fadeel battalion compound, al Berka, Benghazi

== Casualties ==
110-257 opposition members were killed in Benghazi. In addition, another 63 opposition members were killed in Bayda and 29 in Derna. Also, 130 rebelling soldiers were reported to have been executed by government forces. Between 332 and 479 members of the opposition forces died during the fighting in Benghazi, Bayda and Derna. Another 1,932 were wounded. 111 soldiers loyal to Gaddafi were also killed. Of the 325 mercenaries sent to the east to quell the uprising's initial phase, it was reported that 50 were captured and executed by the opposition, and at least 236 were captured alive. The fate of the others was unknown.
