= Uncommon Schools =

Uncommon Schools (Uncommon) is a non-profit charter public school managed and operated in the United States that starts and manages urban schools for low-income students. Uncommon Schools starts and manages 53 urban charter public schools. Uncommon Schools are in five regions: Boston MA, Camden NJ, Newark NJ, New York City, and Rochester NY.

== History ==
The organization first supported the creation of North Star Academy Charter School of Newark, which opened in 1997. North Star was co-founded by Norman Atkins and James Verrilli. In 2005, Uncommon formalized its mission as a charter management organization with the goal of starting and managing schools that create college prep opportunities for low-income children. In 2006, uncommon schools created Rochester prep in Rochester, NY opposed to their other schools that are in popular cities in modern times.In 2009, the founders of Uncommon, along with those of Achievement First and KIPP created Teacher U at Hunter College.

== Results ==
In New York City, Uncommon Schools have performed well on recent standardized tests. Kings Collegiate Middle School received a B rating on their 2011-2012 NYC DOE Progress Report, and Brownsville Collegiate Charter received an A overall rating. At Williamsburg Collegiate, 100% of fifth graders passed the 2009 state Math exam.

On September 9, 2010, U.S. Secretary of Education Arne Duncan recognized Uncommon Schools’ North Star Academy as a 2010 National Blue Ribbon School. The highest award bestowed by the department, it honors 304 public and private elementary, middle, and high schools that demonstrate the highest student achievement in their respective states and/or have closed the achievement gap.

At Troy Prep, 100% of seventh graders passed the 2011-2012 state exam, and 38% of fifth graders passed the ELA exam, which was slightly better than the district average. Seventh grade ELA scores were significantly better at 56% passing (compared to 37% in the district).

== Awards ==
Uncommon Schools won the 2013 Broad Prize for Public Charter Schools and received $250,000 to support college-readiness efforts for their students.
