= KIPP =

Network of college-preparatory charter schools in the United States

KIPP Inc.
- Founded: 1994
- Founder: Mike Feinberg; Dave Levin
- Type: 501(c)(3)
- Tax ID no.: 13-3875888
- Purpose: Educating students nationwide.
- Services: Charter schools
- Affiliations: KIPP Foundation
- Revenue: $168.4 million (2018)
- Expenses: $166.9 million (2018)
- Website: www.kipp.org
- More than 120,000 students 271 schools (2026)

The Knowledge is Power Program (KIPP) is a network of tuition-free, open-enrollment college-preparatory public charter schools serving students in historically underserved communities across the United States. Founded in 1994 by Mike Feinberg and Dave Levin, both former Teach For America corps members, KIPP has grown into one of the largest public charter school networks in the country. The organization's instructional model was influenced by educator Harriett Ball.

As of 2009, KIPP was the largest network of public charter schools in North America. The organization operates regional offices in San Francisco, Chicago, New York City, and Washington, D.C.

KIPP has been involved in teacher training initiatives and was among the charter school organizations that helped establish the Relay Graduate School of Education.

== History ==
KIPP was established in 1994 by Dave Levin and Mike Feinberg after completing their two-year commitment with Teach For America. The program began as an initiative for fifth-grade students in a public school in Houston, Texas. The following year, Feinberg developed KIPP Academy Houston into a charter school, while Levin founded KIPP Academy New York in the South Bronx.

Philanthropist and hedge fund manager Whitney Tilson served on the board of KIPP Academy New York for two decades.

Two books have been written about KIPP: Work Hard. Be Nice.: How Two Inspired Teachers Created the Most Promising Schools in America by Jay Mathews in 2009, and How Children Succeed: Grit, Curiosity, and the Hidden Power of Character by Paul Tough in 2012.

=== KIPP Foundation ===
Doris and Donald Fisher, co-founders of Gap Inc., formed a partnership with Feinberg and Levin to replicate KIPP's operations nationwide.

== Operations ==
=== Application process ===
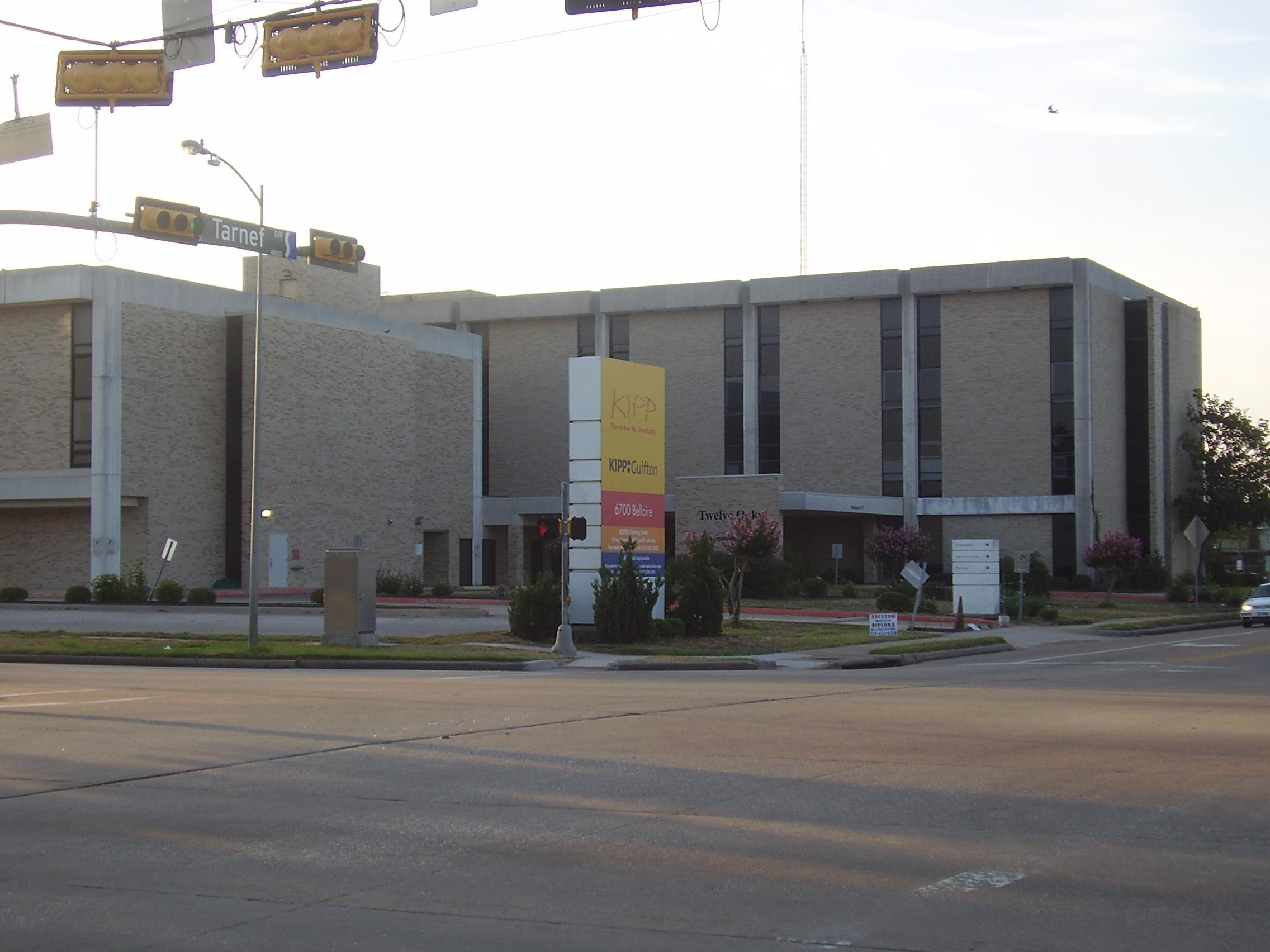
KIPP Gulfton in Greater Sharpstown, Houston, Texas, serving Gulfton

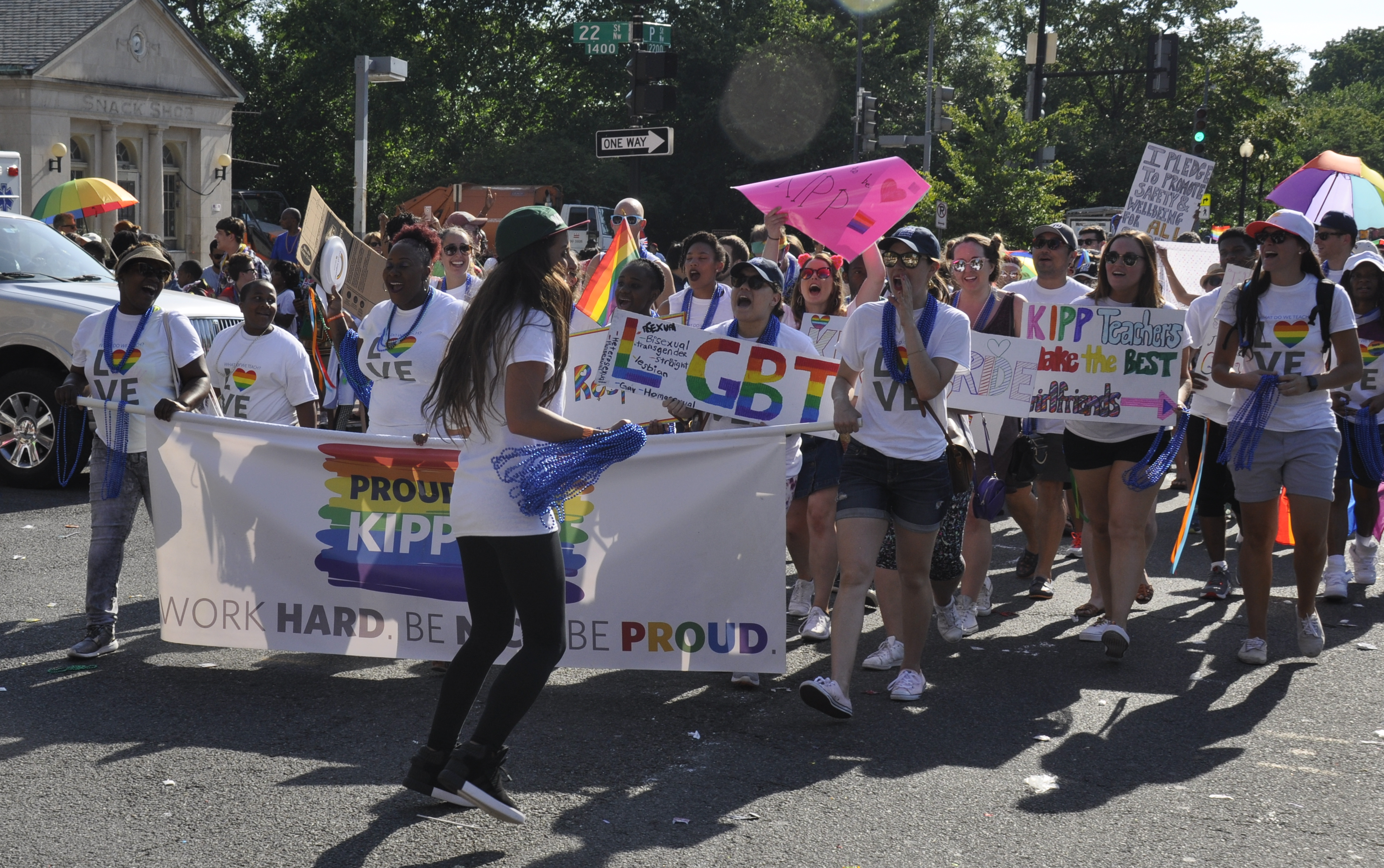
KIPP teachers in 2017 Capital Pride parade

If there are more applicants than seats available, KIPP students are admitted through a lottery system. After a student is selected from the lottery and the student decides that he or she would like to attend a KIPP school, a home visit is set up with a teacher or the principal of the school, who meets with the family and students to discuss expectations of all students, teachers and the parents in KIPP. Students, parents, and teachers are then all required to sign a KIPP commitment of excellence, agreeing to fulfill specific responsibilities, promising that they will do everything in their power to help the student succeed and go to college.

=== School structure ===
KIPP has extended school days to offer extra-curricular activities, and some schools add three extra weeks of school in July. Most KIPP schools run from 7:30 a.m. to 4:00 p.m. Students spend that time in the classroom—up to 50 percent more time than in traditional public schools, depending on the region—and doing activities like sports, performing arts, and visual arts. Many of the activities KIPP offers might otherwise be inaccessible to students because of cost or scheduling issues. Because of this, the extended day offers students and families opportunities they might not get elsewhere.

=== Labor unions ===
In 2011, KIPP made a 10-year agreement with Baltimore Teachers Union following contentious negotiations around teacher work hours. Prior to reaching a contract, the charter network had advanced legislation to bypass collective bargaining and had threatened to close two schools in the city.

In 2018, United Federation of Teachers won the right to represent teachers at a KIPP school in the South Bronx. In 2022, educators at KIPP High School in St. Louis voted to join a union within the American Federation of Teachers. In May 2023, educators at four KIPP schools in Columbus, Ohio formed a union with representation by Ohio Federation of Teachers.

=== Board of directors ===
The KIPP Foundation's board of directors includes executives and investors from several businesses and philanthropic organizations, including Reed Hastings, co-founder of Netflix; John Fisher, executive vice chairman of Pisces, Inc.; Joseph Amato, president and chief investment officer of Equities at Neuberger; and Shavar Jeffries.

== Controversy ==
In February 2018, Feinberg was removed from his position at KIPP due to sexual misconduct allegations involving a KIPP middle school student in the late 1990s and two KIPP employees in the early 2000s. Feinberg denied the accusation by the middle school student, and reached a financial settlement with one of the two KIPP employees.

In 2022, it was revealed KIPP's director of technology had embezzled $2.2 million which he spent on cars and sports memorabilia which was intended for laptops and other equipment. The official killed himself as the investigation was underway. KIPP claimed that the fraud was an isolated incident.

At a KIPP middle school in New York, a teacher was arrested after accusations of grooming and sexually abusing a student for years starting when she was in fourth grade. According to the complaint, the teacher had also made other students uncomfortable with inappropriate touching.

KIPP's Houston charter schools were found to have charged parents unallowable and impermissible fees. Parents said they felt they were duped into what they understood would be a free education. KIPP claimed that the fraud was an isolated incident.

== Peer group ==
KIPP and similar operators of multiple charter schools are known as charter management organizations (CMOs). KIPP is the largest, with 271 schools.

Some for-profit rivals have shied away from managing any brick-and-mortar schools and offer online curricula and other services. These companies, including Stride, Inc. and EdisonLearning, are known as education management organizations (EMOs). Stride was the largest in the US in 2011–2012.

== Outside comments ==
In June 2010, Mathematica Inc. produced the first findings from a multi-year evaluation of KIPP: "Using a matched comparison group design, results show that for the vast majority of KIPP schools in the evaluation, impacts on students' state assessment scores in math and reading are positive, statistically significant, and educationally substantial."

A February 2007 strategy paper for the Brookings Institution think tank commented favorably on the accomplishment of KIPP.

At the vanguard of experimentation with educational methods and techniques are charter schools: public schools that operate outside the normal governance structure of the public school system. In recent years, charter schools such as the Knowledge Is Power Program (KIPP) and Achievement First have upended the way Americans think about educating disadvantaged children, eliminating the sense of impossibility and hopelessness and suggesting a set of highly promising methods.

A research report published in March 2005 by the Economic Policy Institute in book form as The Charter School Dust-Up: Examining the Evidence on Enrollment and Achievement, however, described the degree to which KIPP's admission process selects for likely high achievers:

KIPP students, as a group, enter KIPP with substantially higher achievement than the typical achievement of schools from which they came. ... [T]eachers told us either that they referred students who were more able than their peers, or that the most motivated and educationally sophisticated parents were those likely to take the initiative to pull children out of the public school and enroll in KIPP at the end of fourth grade. Today, KIPP Schools have added Pre-K through 12th grade schools. A clear pattern to emerge from these interviews was that almost always it was students with unusually supportive parents or intact families who were referred to KIPP and completed the enrollment process.

The authors of The Charter School Dust-Up said that KIPP's admission process self-screens for students who are motivated, compliant, and come from similarly motivated, compliant and supportive families. The 2010 Mathematica Policy Research study found that KIPP schools had a "lower concentration of special education and limited English proficiency students than the public schools from which they draw".

Some KIPP schools show high rates of attrition, especially for those students entering the schools with the lowest test scores. A 2008 study by SRI International found that while KIPP fifth-grade students who enter with below-average scores significantly outperform peers in public schools by the end of year one, "60 percent of students who entered fifth grade at four Bay Area KIPP schools in 2003–04 left before completing eighth grade", although research on attrition at one KIPP school in Massachusetts differs. The SRI report also discusses student mobility due to changing economic situations for students' families, but does not directly link this factor into student attrition. Figures for schools in all states are not readily available.

While KIPP's goal is that 75% of KIPP students graduate from college, a report they released in April 2011 stated that the college graduation rate for students who completed the first middle school program in 1999 and 2000 was about 33%. The report states that 95% of the students completed high school, 89% of the students went to college, and 33% of the students earned a degree. For comparison, for students in a similar economic background to that which KIPP draws from, only 70% complete high school, 41% go to college, and 8% earn a four-year degree. Overall in the United States, 83% of students complete high school, 62% enroll in college, and 31% complete a four-year degree.

For the overall graduation rate for students entering college in the United States one study found a 56% result (Pathways to Prosperity Study), and another study found 54% graduated (American Dream 2.0 Report).

KIPP's goal of a 75% college graduation rate is close to the 82% college graduation rate for students coming from the highest income quartile.

Jay Mathews, writing for The Washington Post, was encouraged by the results from the KIPP report, although he pointed out that the sample size was only 200 students, and that after graduating from the KIPP middle school the students were no longer attending a KIPP school. Both Matthews and Kay S. Hymowitz writing for City Journal found the 75% goal to be ambitious.

== See also ==
- Charter School Growth Fund
- Education in the United States
