= North Star Academy Charter School =

Charter school in Newark, New Jersey, United States

North Star Academy Charter School of Newark
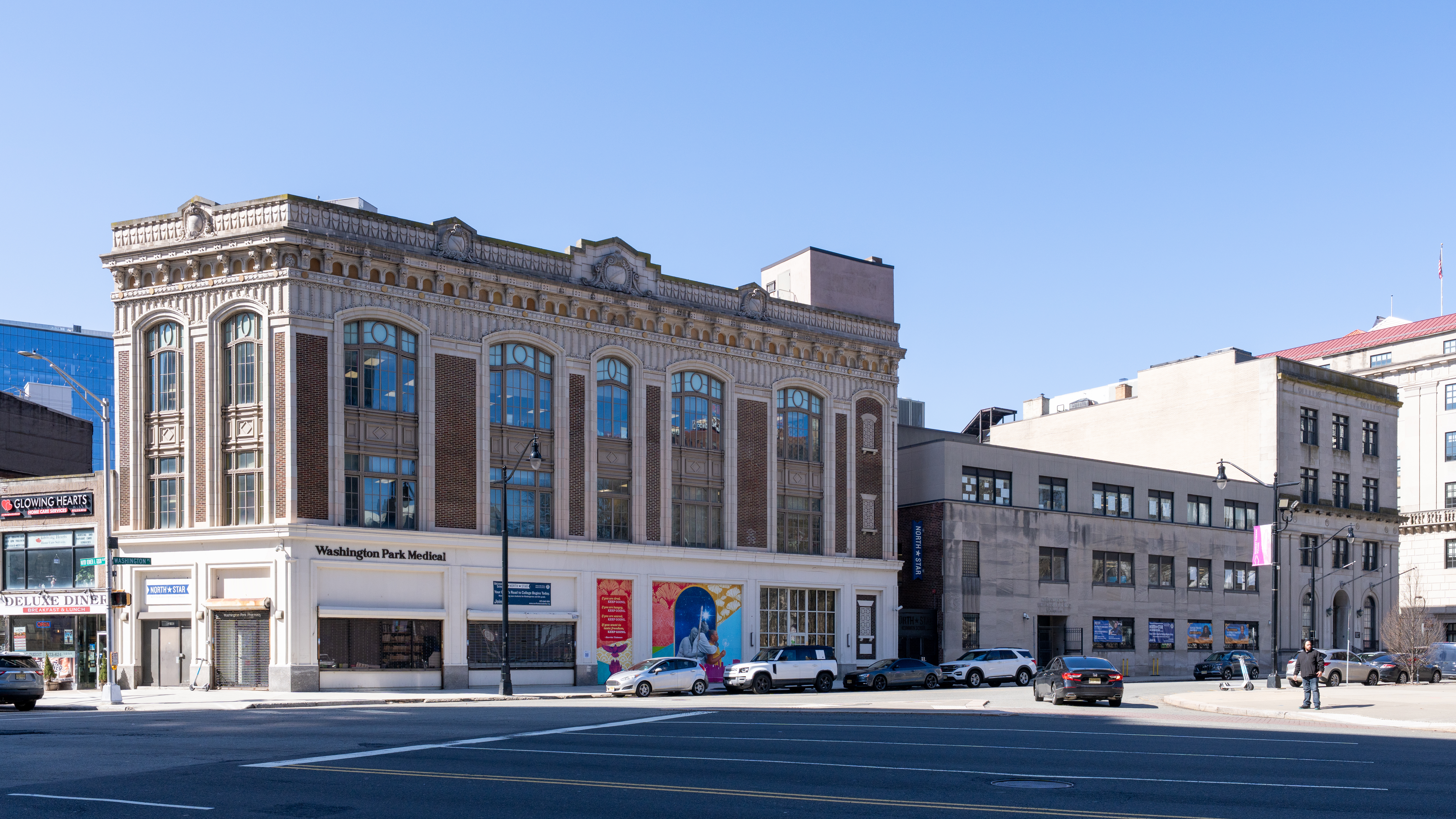

Location
- Newark, New Jersey; United States; 40.7425°N 74.170°W

Information
- Type: Charter school
- Established: 1997
- Authority: Uncommon Schools, Inc. New Jersey Department of Education
- NCES School ID: 340002400289
- Faculty: 189.8 FTEs
- Grades: K-12
- Enrollment: 6,714 (as of 2024–25)
- Student to teacher ratio: 35.4:1
- Colors: Blue gray and white
- Team name: Knights
- Website: northstar.uncommonschools.org

North Star Academy Charter School of Newark is a charter school located in Newark, in Essex County, in the U.S. state of New Jersey, that educates students in kindergarten through twelfth grade. One of the initial group of 17 charter schools approved in January 1997, with plans to begin with classes for fifth and sixth grades, the school was recognized by the National Blue Ribbon Schools Program in 2010.

In 2004, North Star Academy College Preparatory High School graduated its first senior class consisting of 19 students, all of whom were accepted into accredited four-year universities.

As of the 2024–25 school year, the school had an enrollment of 6,714 students and 189.8 classroom teachers (on an FTE basis), for a student–teacher ratio of 35.4:1. There were 5,136 students (76.5% of enrollment) eligible for free lunch and 688 (10.2% of students) eligible for reduced-cost lunch.

North Star Academy has 15 campuses: seven elementary schools, six middle schools (Clinton Hill, Vailsburg, Central Avenue, Downtown, Lincoln Park and West Side Park) and two high schools (Washington Park and Lincoln Park).

In 2000, New Jersey Governor Christine Todd Whitman and then-Governor of Texas George W. Bush toured the school, hailing it as an example of reform.

== Awards and recognition ==
For the 2010 school year, the school was honored as a National Blue Ribbon School by the United States Department of Education, the highest award granted to American schools.

In the 2011 "Ranking America's High Schools" issue by The Washington Post, the school was ranked 11th in New Jersey and 507th nationwide.

In 2008, North Star Academy was awarded a Bronze Medal in the U.S. News & World Report/SchoolMatters ranking of Best High Schools.

In 2015, U.S. News & World Report ranked North Star Academy 8th in its list of top-ranked New Jersey high schools.

Schooldigger.com ranked the school as one of 16 schools tied for first out of 381 public high schools statewide in its 2011 rankings (an increase of 38 positions from the 2010 ranking) which were based on the combined percentage of students classified as proficient or above proficient on the language arts literacy (100.0%) and mathematics (100.0%) components of the High School Proficiency Assessment (HSPA).

In 2014, NSA High School principal Michael Mann received the Ryan Award for best urban principal in the country, one of three principals nationwide to be recognized by the Accelerate Institute.

== Influences ==
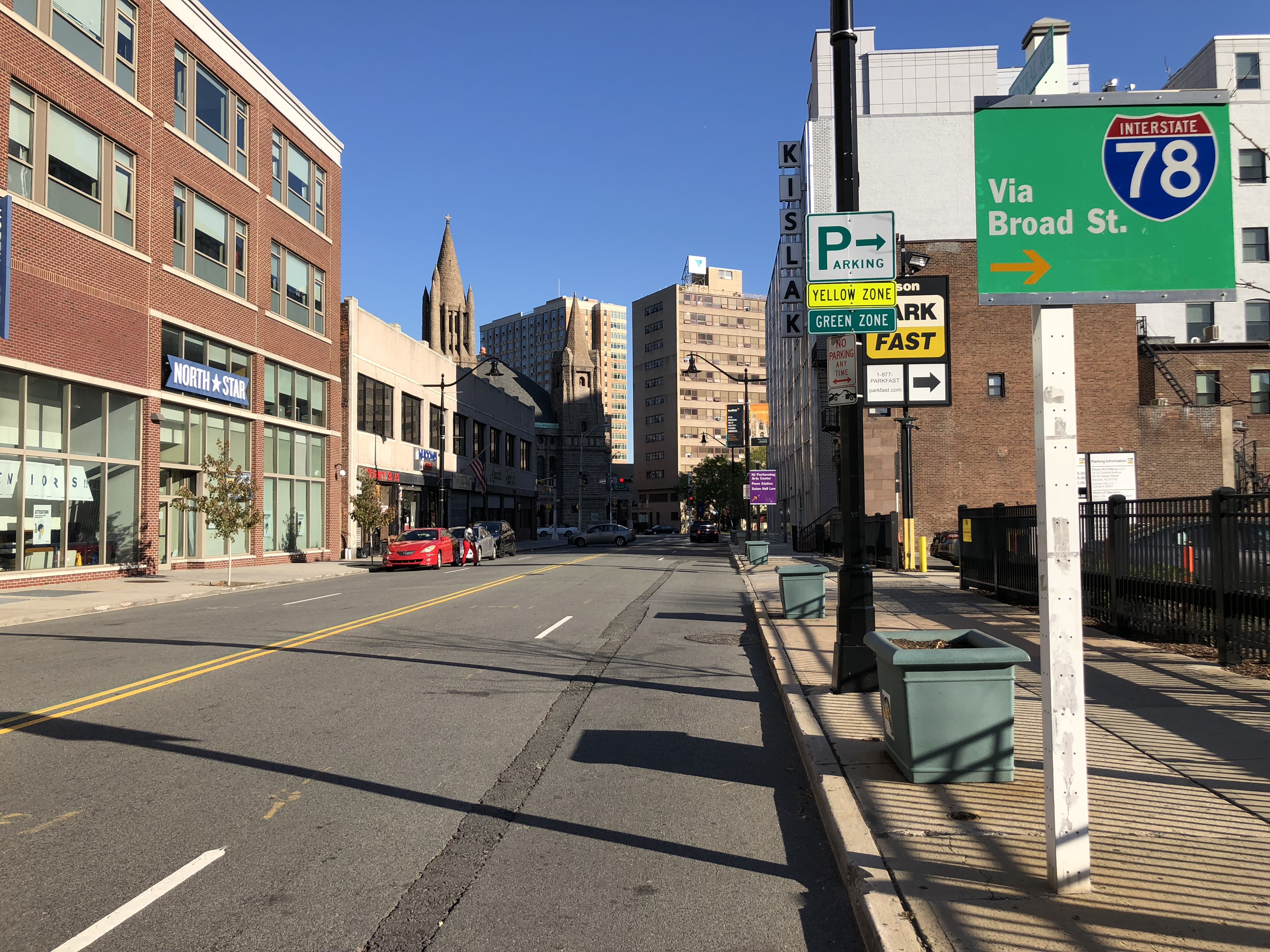
North Star on Central Avenue in Downtown Newark

Due to North Star Academy's success in urban district areas other schools have adopted some of their ideas in managing challenging students and have even modeled themselves after it. One such school is Foundation Academy Charter School located in Trenton, New Jersey which was established in 2007.

== Athletics ==
The North Star Academy Knights compete athletically under the supervision of the New Jersey State Interscholastic Athletic Association (NJSIAA). With 739 students in grades 10-12, the school was classified by the NJSIAA for the 2019–20 school year as Group II for most athletic competition purposes, which included schools with an enrollment of 486 to 758 students in that grade range.

The Knights began the season on a nine-game winning streak. The North Star Knights won the Conference Championship against Lyndhurst High School by a score of 63–57, to bring North Star its first ever basketball championship. They went on to compete in the state tournament against Bernards High School, winning 53–48. Their streak ended when they lost to Hackettstown High School, 43–40.
