= Harriett Ball =

American educator

Harriett Jane Hill Ball (July 1, 1946 – February 2, 2011) was an American educator who inspired the KIPP program.

== Life ==
Harriett Ball was born Harriett Jane Hill in 1946 in Rosenberg, Texas. Her mother was a teacher and her father a longshoreman. Her parents divorced and she continued to live with her brilliant mother, along with her brother, and three sisters. She and all of her siblings earned college degrees. Her mother worked tirelessly to provide for them all. Ball wanted to be a teacher from an early age, modeling herself after her mother's sister. She received her degree in teaching from Huston-Tillotson University in Austin, Texas. Ball was married three times. Ball had four children, and has nine grandchildren. She loved horses and crossword puzzles. She died at the age of 64 from a heart attack.

== Career & Innovation ==
Ball taught in Houston, Texas as a public school elementary school teacher. After fifteen years of teaching, she discovered that her students were struggling to read, and she developed a song to help them read. She called her technique "Rap, Rhythm, & Rhyme." She got her students to chant and rap along to their lessons, which she referred to as meeting the children at their level of learning. Her style was not always appreciated as it deviated from the norms of teaching, but her measures were quickly shown to be effective.

In 1992, her colleague David Levin worked for Teach For America and was struggling in the same public school Ball worked in, Bastian Elementary, located in Houston. He asked her for mentorship. She also mentored Mike Feinberg, who was also working for Teach For America. Together, Levin and Feinberg shadowed Ball and asked her for mentorship, and the two went on to found the Knowledge is Power Program. Feinberg cited Ball's mentorship as integral to the creation and initial idea of KIPP, and spoke highly of her teaching abilities. Feinberg and Levin called her the best teacher they had ever seen working. Ball's chant of "Knowledge is power, power is money, and I want it," became the namesake of KIPP. KIPP now serves about 27,000 children in 20 different states, and the District of Columbia, and 99 schools.

Ball went on to teach in the Houston and Austin, Texas school districts for a total of 35 years. In 1996, she invested her pension, borrowed on her mortgage, and started her own business to help other teachers improve. She started Harriett Ball Enterprises and went on to lead workshops to teach educators and personnel about how to reach and teach at-risk students. She also taught students as well. Many school districts credited her with large increases in test scores after she came to deliver workshops.

== Appearances ==
Ball appeared on The Oprah Winfrey Show, as well as other nationally televised programs. Footage of her also appeared in the documentary Waiting for "Superman".

== Honors ==
Galveston, Texas named September 14 Harriett Ball Day, after she helped in their school district. In 2009, Ball was inducted into the National Public Charter School Hall of Fame. She was named by Wendy Kopp and Forbes as one of the world's 7 Most Powerful Educators.
