= Hilal Al-Ahmadi =

Iraqi journalist

- Born: Hilal Al-Ahmadi; 1954?
- Died: February 17, 2011; Mosul, Iraq
- Occupation: Newspaper Journalist
- Spouse: Married
- Children: 4 children

Hilal Al-Ahmadi (1954? – 17 February 2011), who was an Iraqi veteran journalist with over 30 years of experience and well known for his reports about corruption, was assassinated in front of his home east of Mosul, Iraq.

His death preceded by days the intimidation of the Iraqi press that occurred during the Arab Spring- inspired Iraqi protests.

The response by major IGO and NGOs to Al-Ahmadi's killing was to denounce the "culture of impunity" in Iraq which leads to further violence against journalists.

== Career ==
According to CNN, Al-Ahmadi had over 30 years of experience as a journalist. He wrote freelance for the Mosul Echo and the Iraqiyoun in Mosul, Iraq. He also wrote for al Hadba', al Isalah al Jadid, and al Sawt al Akhar He worked as a spokesperson for the communication services of the Ninawa Governorate but was let go shortly before his assassination.

Hilal Al-Ahmadi often addressed financial and administrative corruption or the government's inability to supply services. In fact, Al-Ahmadi was well known for these kinds of reports.

== Background ==
Al-Ahmadi was shot dead shortly before the Journalistic Freedoms Observatory's office was ransacked on 24 February by Iraqi soldiers and before the "Day of Rage" protests in Iraq. The nationwide protests in Iraq on 25 February were inspired by the Arab Spring uprisings in Tunisia and Egypt. Protests also took place in major Iraqi cities Mosul, where Al-Ahmadi was attacked. The protests centered on corruption and lack of services that Al-Ahmadi had written about. Journalistic Freedoms Observatory estimated that 160 journalists had been detained after Al-Ahmadi's death and around the protests. For example, Hadi al-Mahdi was among the journalists who were either arrested or detained during those days. Reporters Without Borders called this time “one of the blackest days for media freedom” in Iraq.

== Death ==
Hilal Al-Ahmadi, 57, was leaving his home for work 17 February 2011, when a car drove up to him. The car carried two men with automatic weapons who then shot the journalist. Al-Ahmadi was shot multiple times and was found dead in his suburb of Mithaq, located in Eastern Mosul, Iraq. Al-Ahmadi's body was taken to Mosul's department of forensic medicine. As with all the other cases of killed journalists in Iraq since 2003, the perpetrators have not been brought to justice.

== International Reaction to Al-Ahmadi's Death ==
The overall reaction to Hilal Al-Ahmadi's death by organizations who defend the rights of journalists worldwide was frustration over Iraq's high impunity for such attacks.

The Committee to Protect Journalists said in a CNN report and in reaction to Al-Ahmadi's death, "Not a single journalist murder since 2003 has been seriously investigated by authorities, and not a single perpetrator has been brought to justice."

According to the Committee to Protect Journalists, Iraq was ranked #1 on the 2010 Impunity Index. The impunity index focuses on journalists who are killed on a recurring basis and the crimes often go unpunished. Iraq has been at the #1 spot for the last 3 years.

Jean-François Julliard, who is secretary-general of Reporters Without Borders, said in an Agence France Press report about Al-Hamadi's death: "The murders of journalists in Iraq are not letting up and generalized impunity is fuelling the cycle of violence. Very few of 232 murders of in Iraq (since 2003) have been thoroughly and conclusively investigated. Impunity must not prevail in Iraq."

Mohamed Abdel Dayem, CPJ's Middle East and North Africa program coordinator, said: "We call on the Iraqi authorities to vigorously investigate the killing of Hilal al-Ahmadi and bring those behind it to justice. It is time for the government to take the long-delayed initial steps toward ending a years-long record of impunity for journalist murders in Iraq."

Aidan White, who is the general secretary of the International Federation of Journalists, said, "The lack of credible action on violence against media sends a dangerous sign to media predators," added White. "It encourages further attacks and the Iraqi authorities need to end this culture of impunity."

Irina Bokova, who is the director-general of UNESCO, said: "I condemn the murder of Iraqi freelance journalist Hilal al-Ahmadi. Attacking journalists cannot be tolerated. By denying citizens access to information, these crimes tear at the very fabric of emerging democracies. They must be investigated and punished."

== Personal life ==
Hilal al-Ahmadi was married and had four children.
