= Edwin D. Kilbourne =

American scientist

Edwin Dennis Kilbourne
- Born: July 10, 1920; Buffalo, New York, US
- Died: February 21, 2011 (aged 90); Branford, Connecticut
- Education: Cornell University, AB 1942, MD 1944
- Occupation: Biomedical Scientist
- Employer(s): New York Medical College, Distinguished Service Professor
- Known for: Microbiology, Influenza virology, Humorous verse
- Spouse: Joy Schmid Kilbourne (m. 1953-2011)
- Children: Edwin Michael Kilbourne, Richard Schmid Kilbourne, Christopher Norton Kilbourne, Paul Alward Kilbourne
- Parent(s): Father: Edwin I. and Elizabeth Alward Kilbourne

Edwin Dennis Kilbourne (July 10, 1920 – February 21, 2011) was an American research scientist. Born in Buffalo, New York, he received his AB and MD degrees from Cornell University. After completion of service in the Medical Corps of the Army of the United States at the end of World War II, he trained in virus research at The Rockefeller Institute. Subsequently, he taught successively on the faculties of four medical schools: Tulane, Cornell, Mount Sinai (as Chairman of the Department of Microbiology and Distinguished Service Professor), and New York Medical College (as Research, then Emeritus, Professor).

An internationally recognized research scientist who made significant contributions to the study and prevention of influenza and other viral diseases, he developed the first genetically engineered vaccine of any kind more than 30 years ago. This method became the standard for optimization of the virus used to produce the influenza vaccines that many of us receive on a yearly basis.

Kilbourne was the recipient of numerous honors and awards. He received the National Institutes of Health (NIH) Career award in 1961 and was given the NIH's Dyer Award in 1973. In 1977, he was honored by an invitation to give New York City's Harvey Lecture. In 1983, he received the New York Academy of Medicine Award.

As one of the country's leaders in biomedical science during the latter 20th century, Kilbourne was elected to the National Academy of Sciences, the Association of American Physicians and the American Philosophical Society. Kilbourne served on advisory committees to the National Institutes of Health, the Centers for Disease Control and Prevention and the Center for Biologics Evaluation and Research of the FDA. In the late 1970s he developed and chaired a series of published workshops on influenza for the NIH. He also worked with the pharmaceutical industry in the development and trials of a new, experimental influenza vaccine.

Kilbourne also had a lifelong interest in non-scientific writing and has published humorous verses and essays in magazines for the general public. These were inspired by whimsical news items gleaned from the press - most of them dealing with the often bizarre mating habits of sub-human species. They all meet together in Strategies of Sex, a work of humorous poetry published in 2005.
