= Harry Walsh =

Canadian lawyer

Harry Walsh OC, QC
- Born: August 21, 1913
- Died: February 24, 2011 (aged 97); Winnipeg, Manitoba
- Occupation: lawyer
- Years active: 70 years
- Known for: proponent for abolition of capital punishment in Canada
- Notable work: founder, Jewish Foundation of Manitoba
- Children: 2

Harry Walsh OC QC (August 21, 1913 – February 24, 2011) was a Canadian lawyer who practiced criminal law for over 70 years. Walsh was a leading proponent in the abolition of capital punishment in Canada. In recognition of that role, as well as his advocacy of access to legal representation and work in the Manitoba Jewish community, Walsh was named an Officer of the Order of Canada on December 31, 2010. Walsh died before the investiture ceremony that occurred on May 27, 2011. Walsh was still practicing law at the time of his death and he called himself "the oldest working lawyer in Canada".

== Career ==
Walsh was called to the bar of Manitoba in 1937. He took time from his practice to serve in World War II as a lance-bombardier in the Royal Canadian Artillery.

During his legal career, Walsh was one of those responsible for establishing Legal Aid Manitoba in the 1970s. Walsh was also a leading opponent of capital punishment in Canada, serving as the co-chair of a committee advocating for its abolition. During the annual plenary session of the Canadian Bar Association held in Quebec City in August 1975, Walsh succeeded in the passage of a resolution by the CBA supporting the abolition of capital punishment. The following year, the Canadian Parliament voted to abolish capital punishment (except for certain military offences, which were abolished in 1998).

Outside of his legal practice, Walsh was a founder of the Jewish Foundation of Manitoba. He died in 2011 at Winnipeg, Manitoba.
