= Tykhon Zhylyakov =

Tykhon Zhylyakov (9 July 1968 – 18 February 2011) was the Eastern Orthodox bishop of Kremenchuk and Lubny, Ukraine, of the Ukrainian Orthodox Church.

He died on 18 February 2011 at the age of 42.
