= Chloe Dzubilo =

American artist, musician, and transgender activist

Chloe Dzubilo (December 5, 1960 – February 18, 2011) was an American artist, musician, and transgender activist. She was born in Connecticut.

Dzubilo was a fixture of the 1980s and 1990s New York City club and art scene: she briefly worked at Studio 54, was an editor at the East Village Eye, worked with Blacklips Performance Cult at the Pyramid Club, and she was the lead singer and songwriter of the punk band Transisters, who performed at CBGB's. Filmmaker Kembra Pfahler said of Dzubilo's band, "Transisters was one of the only bands that addressed issues around AIDS and had the courage to sing about their anger. And to alchemically transform all of the hatred and stigma around the disease itself." Dzubilo's artwork took many forms, and she often worked in ink on paper as her medium.

Chloe studied art at Parsons School of Design and received an associate degree in Gender Studies from the City College of New York in 1999.

She became an influence of fashion designers including Marc Jacobs and Patricia Field.

== Activism ==
Dzubilo was a longtime transgender activist with the Gender Identity Project at the New York City LGBT Community Center, and after her HIV diagnosis in 1987 became involved in AIDS activism. She joined the political group Transgender Menace and was the founder of the Equi-Aid Project, a horse-riding program for AIDS-affected and at-risk youth. Additionally she participated in SpeakOUT events as a panelist where she talked about issues of substance abuse recovery along with activists like Alison Terson. She was appointed to the HIV and Human Service Planning Council of New York in 2003.

== Legacy and archive ==
When asked by the magazine HIV Plus in 1998 what advice she would give, she said, "Buy a lot of glitter and pat it on your eyes first thing in the morning - it's good for your endorphins. Empower yourself with the word tacky. And sing. All day. That's what I do."

Her funeral was held on March 12, 2011, at Judson Memorial Church. Fellow artists, activists, and friends who attended include Rosario Dawson, Anohni, Justin Bond, and Katrina Del Mar.

In 2011, the Chloe Awards were established to celebrate people whose work embodies the spirit of Marsha P. Johnson, Sylvia Rivera, and Chloe Dzubilo. The Chloe Faith Dzubilo Papers are held in the Fales Library and Special Collections at New York University.

In 2017, her work was featured in the exhibition "AIDS at Home" at the Museum of the City of New York.
