= Rebekah Johansson =

Swedish model

- Born: 4 May 1981; Enköping, Sweden
- Died: February 23, 2011 (aged 29)
- Occupations: Glamour model, Caring for abused animals
- Known for: Big Brother Sweden, Playboy

Rebekah Johansson (May 4, 1981 in Enköping – February 23, 2011) was a Swedish glamour model who also participated in Big Brother Sweden 2004 Johansson modelled for men's magazines such as FHM, Moore Magazine and American Playboy Magazine, she started her career at MIKAS modeling agency. Johansson also owned a dog shelter for abused dogs and she also was an occasional bartender at events in Sweden. She modelled for American Playboy along with model friend Elita Löfblad.
