= María Azambuya =

Uruguayan actress

- Born: 5 October 1944; Montevideo
- Died: 26 February 2011 (aged 66); Montevideo
- Occupation: Actress

María Azambuya (5 October 1944 – 26 February 2011) was an Uruguayan actress and theatre director.

== Biography ==
Azambuya graduated from the Municipal School of Dramatic Arts. In 1973, she joined the theatre group El Galpón, with whom she would participate in the production of over 50 theatrical works as an actress or as a director. She would remain a member of El Galpón until her death, even when the group was exiled to Mexico by the Civic-military dictatorship of Uruguay. Between 1992 and 2010, Azampuya was a professor of theatre arts at the Municipal School of Dramatic Arts.

Azambuya performed in such works as Molière's The Miser (1973), Aristophanes's Plutus (1974), Víctor Manuel Leites's Doña Ramona (1974), Voces de amor y lucha (a collection of works in Mexico, 1980), Milton Schinca and Rubén Yáñez's Artigas general del pueblo (1981), Carlos Maggi's El patio de la Torcaza, Oduvaldo Vianna Filho's Rasga corazón (1988), José Sanchis Sinisterra's ¡Ay Carmela! (1990), Bertolt Brecht's The Good Person of Szechwan, Neil Simon's El prisionero de la Segunda Avenida, and Ramón del Valle-Inclán's Bohemian Lights, among others.
