= Jerry Ames =

- Born: June 5, 1930; Brooklyn, New York, USA
- Died: February 7, 2011 (aged 80)
- Occupation: Tap dancer
- Years active: 1953–2011

Jerry Ames (June 5, 1930 Brooklyn, New York, USA– February 7, 2011 Woodbury, New York, USA) was an American tap dancer centered in New York. In 1977, he co-authored The Book of Tap: Recovering America's Long Lost Dance with Jim Siegelman. In 1980, he was a featured performer in the movie Tap Dancin' by Christian Blackwood. In 2006, he received a Flo Bert Award for his lifetime contribution to tap dance.
