= Charles E. Silberman =

American journalist

- Born: Charles Eliot Silberman; January 31, 1925 Des Moines, Iowa, U.S.
- Died: February 5, 2011 (aged 86) Sarasota, Florida, U.S.
- Occupation: Journalist; author
- Education: Columbia University (BA)
- Notable awards: Gerald Loeb Award (1966)
- Children: 4

Charles Eliot Silberman (January 31, 1925 – February 5, 2011) was an American journalist and author.

Silberman was born in Des Moines, Iowa. After service in the Pacific during World War II, he gained a B.A. in Economics from Columbia University in 1946 and also undertook graduate studies at Columbia. Subsequently, he taught at Columbia and City College of New York before joining Fortune magazine in 1953. He remained there until the early 1970s.

He was the author of Criminal Violence, Criminal Justice (1978), a study of crime and the American criminal justice system.

Silberman used econometric methods to measure the effectiveness in terms of criminal deterrence of two factors: the degree of punishment; and the probability of apprehension. A simple "expected loss" model would predict that deterrent effect would depend only on the result of multiplying the penalty by the probability of it occurring. Silberman concluded that contrary to this model, the likelihood of punishment had a greater effect in most situations. Silberman also stated, "Crime does more than expose the weakness in social relationships; it undermines the social order itself, by destroying the assumptions on which it is based."

Silberman's book Crisis in the Classroom: The Remaking of American Education is regarded as one of the leading investigations into and critiques of the performance of the American educational system and has been praised for its scope and insight.

He was also the author of Crisis in Black and White and A Certain People: American Jews and Their Lives Today.

Silberman died on February 5, 2011, in Sarasota, Florida, aged 86. He had four sons and six grandchildren.

== Awards ==
- 1966 Gerald Loeb Award for Magazines for "Technology and the Labor Market"
