= Ted Bates (politician) =

American politician (1926–2011)

4th mayor of Warren, Michigan
- In office April 1967 – November 6, 1981
- Preceded by: William (Bill) Shaw
- Succeeded by: James R. Randlett

Personal details
- Born: September 30, 1926 Detroit, Michigan
- Died: February 20, 2011 (aged 84) Traverse City, Michigan
- Party: Democrat
- Education: Lincoln High School (Warren, Michigan)

Ted Bates (September 30, 1926 – February 20, 2011) was a politician from Michigan. He was the longest-serving mayor of Warren, Michigan. Warren is the largest city in Macomb County, the third-largest city in Michigan, and Metro Detroit's largest suburb.

Bates served as mayor for longer than any of the prior eight Warren mayors since the city was converted from a village to a city form of government in 1957. He challenged federal officials over low-income housing. Before he first decided to run for mayor he was the city treasurer. He initially had backing from the political machine of Warren's first mayor, Arthur J. Miller, which enabled him to defeat his predecessor, three-term incumbent William "Bill" Shaw. A strike by the city's sanitation workers also contributed to this outcome.

He led Warren's protest against the United States Department of Housing and Urban Development (HUD) in the 1970s, when it attempted to require Warren to desegregate the suburbs by developing low-income housing. Angry protesters began rocking former Michigan governor and HUD Secretary George Romney's car when he visited Lincoln High School to explain the federal government's stance on the matter. He escaped the crowd with help from the state police.

Bates was a World War II Navy veteran. His rank was seaman first class.
