= Lu Bain =

American gridiron football player (1942–2011)

Profile
- Position: Running back

Personal information
- Born: September 2, 1942; Paint Rock, Alabama, U.S.
- Died: February 4, 2011
- Listed height: 5 ft 11 in (1.80 m)
- Listed weight: 190 lb (86 kg)

Career information
- College: Oregon

Career history
- 1964–1966: Calgary Stampeders
- 1966: Edmonton Eskimos

Lu Bain (September 2, 1942 – February 4, 2011) was an American professional football player who played for the Calgary Stampeders and Edmonton Eskimos of the Canadian Football League. He played college football at the University of Oregon.
