= Carolyn Calfee =

American physician (born 1973)

Carolyn S. Calfee
- Born: 1973 (age 52–53); Houston, Texas, US
- Education: University of Pennsylvania (MD); Yale University
- Known for: Acute respiratory distress syndrome
- Scientific career
- Workplaces: University of California, San Francisco
- Website: UCSF profile

Carolyn S. Calfee (born 1973) is a Professor of Medicine and Anaesthesia at the University of California, San Francisco. She works in intensive care at the UCSF Medical Center where she specialises in acute respiratory distress syndrome. During the COVID-19 pandemic Calfee studied why SARS-CoV-2 patients experienced such different symptoms.

== Early life and education ==
Calfee was born in Houston. She was an undergraduate student at Yale University, where she was in the Phi Beta Kappa honour society. She attended medical school at the University of Pennsylvania, and graduated in 1999. In 1999 Calfee moved to San Francisco, where was a graduate student in clinical research at the University of California, San Francisco (UCSF). She was Chief Resident during her training in UCSF, where she focussed on pulmonary and critical care medicine. After her research training Calfee was appointed to the faculty at UCSF.

== Research and career ==
Calfee uses biomarkers to investigate the development, ability to detect and impact of treatment on acute lung injury and acute respiratory distress syndrome (ARDS). In critically ill patients, ARDS is a frequent cause of acute respiratory failure, and has mortality rates of up to 40%. Calfee studies different phenotypes of ARDS in an effort to identify novel treatments. By understanding unrecognised subphenotypes of people who suffer from ARDS, Calfee looks to test more targeted interventions. She identified that around one third of ARDS patients have a hyper-inflammatory phenotype, which may be more responsive to mechanical ventilation and pharmacotherapy. This particular phenotype is associated with elevated levels of proinflammatory biomarkers in plasma as well as an increase in organ dysfunction.

She has explored to role of different environmental exposures on the prevalence of ARDS. As part of this work, Calfee has studied the biological impact of vaping. In 2016, she was part of a $20 million Food and Drug Administration program to study the impact of emerging tobacco products, including electronic cigarettes and heated tobacco products. In particular, Calfee focussed on the impact of different aspects of electronic cigarettes on acute lung injury. She represented the American Thoracic Society in the creation of a Centers for Disease Control and Prevention (CDC) clinical guideline on the health impacts of vaping, with a focus on how it impacts lung injury. Calfee is concerned about the use of e-cigarettes amongst adolescents, and emphasised that e-cigarettes should not be used by youths or young adults. In 2019 she was elected to the American Society for Clinical Investigation.

During the COVID-19 pandemic Calfee studied why SARS-CoV-2 patients experienced such different symptoms; ranging from mild to life-threatening. Her research identified that the infection attacks the alveolar epithelium, small air sacs that usually prevent fluid entering the lungs. When the barrier between the air sacs and blood becomes leaky, fluid starts to pour into the lungs. This damage can be so severe that it takes a long time to heal, which means that the time for ventilation is longer than expected. In this specific type of RNA virus, a human's immune system response can be so intense that it damages the lungs. Calfee analyses the fluid and blood samples to understand what factors cause the most extreme responses of coronavirus disease. At the time, Calfee served as an intensive care physician, and remarked that “the scale and severity of this epidemic is like nothing any of us have experienced,”.

== Selected publications ==
- Calfee, Carolyn S; Delucchi, Kevin; Parsons, Polly E; Thompson, B Taylor; Ware, Lorraine B; Matthay, Michael A (August 2014). "Subphenotypes in acute respiratory distress syndrome: latent class analysis of data from two randomised controlled trials". The Lancet Respiratory Medicine. 2 (8): 611–620. doi:10.1016/s2213-2600(14)70097-9. ISSN 2213-2600. PMC 4154544. PMID 24853585.
- Wilson, Jennifer G; Liu, Kathleen D; Zhuo, Hanjing; Caballero, Lizette; McMillan, Melanie; Fang, Xiaohui; Cosgrove, Katherine; Vojnik, Rosemary; Calfee, Carolyn S; Lee, Jae-Woo; Rogers, Angela J (January 2015). "Mesenchymal stem (stromal) cells for treatment of ARDS: a phase 1 clinical trial". The Lancet Respiratory Medicine. 3 (1): 24–32. doi:10.1016/s2213-2600(14)70291-7. ISSN 2213-2600. PMC 4297579. PMID 25529339.
- Cohen, Mitchell Jay; Call, Mariah; Nelson, Mary; Calfee, Carolyn S.; Esmon, Charles T.; Brohi, Karim; Pittet, Jean Francois (February 2012). "Critical Role of Activated Protein C in Early Coagulopathy and Later Organ Failure, Infection and Death in Trauma Patients". Annals of Surgery. 255 (2): 379–385. doi:10.1097/SLA.0b013e318235d9e6. ISSN 0003-4932. PMC 3549308. PMID 22133894.
