= Ferbent Shehu =

Albanian dancer

- Born: January 10, 1933; Berat, Albania
- Died: February 8, 2011 (aged 78); Berat, Albania
- Occupations: Dancer, Choreographer

Ferbent Shehu (January 10, 1933 – February 8, 2011) was an Albanian dancer and choreographer.

== Biography ==
He was born in the small southern Albanian town of Berat to a wealthy family. When the Communist regime came to power, part of his family was persecuted and their properties were taken by the state. He first started his career in Dance in 1949 when the Berat's Boys and Girls Dancing group was first found. In 1957 he also started working as a professional choreographer and dancer. His long career was the scene of many professional achievements in national competitions and he won several trophies. In 2006 his group of dancers competed in Florence, Italy and came before groups from many other countries such as Spain, Austria, Germany, France...etc.

He was the third of four brothers, was married and had a son.

On February 8, 2011, Ferbent died nearly a month after his 78th birthday after suffering a heart attack the day before.
