= Achievement First =

- Tax ID no.: 65-1203744
- Headquarters: New Haven, Connecticut
- Services: Charter school management
- Website: www.achievementfirst.org
- 34 schools (2017)

Achievement First is a charter school network in the United States. Achievement First operates schools in Connecticut (beginning with Amistad Academy in New Haven in 1999 along with other schools in New Haven, Bridgeport and Hartford), New York City (beginning in 2005 with schools in Brownsville, Bushwick, Crown Heights and East New York) and Rhode Island.

Achievement First was one of the charter school organizations helping to establish Relay School for Education (formerly CUNY's Teacher U).

Achievement First runs 41 schools that serve approximately 12,500 students.

== List of Schools ==
Achievement First has 11 schools in Connecticut, 24 schools in New York, and 7 in Rhode Island.

AF Schools in Connecticut
| State | City | Grade Level | Name |
|---|---|---|---|
| CT | Bridgeport | Elementary | Achievement First Bridgeport Academy Elementary School |
| CT | Bridgeport | Middle | Achievement First Bridgeport Academy Middle School |
| CT | Hartford | Elementary | Achievement First Hartford Academy Elementary School |
| CT | Hartford | Middle | Achievement First Hartford Academy Middle School |
| CT | Hartford | Middle | Achievement First Summit Middle School |
| CT | Hartford | High | Achievement First Hartford High School |
| CT | New Haven | Elementary | Amistad Academy Elementary School |
| CT | New Haven | Elementary | Elm City College Preparatory Elementary School |
| CT | New Haven | Middle | Amistad Academy Middle School |
| CT | New Haven | Middle | Elm City College Preparatory Middle School |
| CT | New Haven | High | Achievement First Amistad High School |

AF Schools in New York
| State | City | Type | Name |
|---|---|---|---|
| NY | Brooklyn | Elementary | Achievement First Apollo Elementary School |
| NY | Brooklyn | Elementary | Achievement First Aspire Elementary School |
| NY | Brooklyn | Elementary | Achievement First Brownsville Elementary School |
| NY | Brooklyn | Elementary | Achievement First Bushwick Elementary School |
| NY | Brooklyn | Elementary | Achievement First Crown Heights Elementary School |
| NY | Brooklyn | Elementary | Achievement First East New York Elementary School |
| NY | Brooklyn | Elementary | Achievement First Endeavor Elementary School |
| NY | Brooklyn | Elementary | Achievement First Linden Elementary School |
| NY | Brooklyn | Elementary | Achievement First North Brooklyn Prep Elementary School |
| NY | Brooklyn | Middle | Achievement First Apollo Middle School |
| NY | Brooklyn | Middle | Achievement First Aspire Middle School |
| NY | Brooklyn | Middle | Achievement First Brownsville Middle School |
| NY | Brooklyn | Middle | Achievement First Bushwick Middle School |
| NY | Brooklyn | Middle | Achievement First Crown Heights Middle School |
| NY | Brooklyn | Middle | Achievement First East New York Middle School |
| NY | Brooklyn | Middle | Achievement First Endeavor Middle School |
| NY | Brooklyn | Middle | Achievement First Linden Middle School |
| NY | Brooklyn | Middle | Achievement First North Brooklyn Prep Middle School |
| NY | Brooklyn | Middle | Achievement First Voyager Middle School |
| NY | Brooklyn | High | Achievement First Brooklyn High School |
| NY | Brooklyn | High | Achievement First East Brooklyn High School |
| NY | Brooklyn | High | Achievement First Ujima High School |
| NY | Brooklyn | High | Achievement First University Prep High School |
| NY | Queens | Elementary | Achievement First Legacy Elementary School |

AF Schools in Rhode Island
| State | City | Type | Name |
|---|---|---|---|
| RI | Cranston | Elementary | Achievement First Iluminar Mayoral Academy Elementary School |
| RI | Providence | Elementary | Achievement First Providence Mayoral Academy Elementary School |
| RI | Providence | Middle | Achievement First Providence Mayoral Academy Middle School |
| RI | Cranston | Middle | Achievement First Iluminar Mayoral Academy Middle School |
| RI | Providence | Elementary | Achievement First Promesa Mayoral Academy Elementary School |
| RI | Providence | Elementary | Achievement First Envision Elementary |
| RI | Providence | High | Achievement First Providence High School |

== Special Education Lawsuit ==
In 2015, five special education students at Achievement First Crown Heights (in Brooklyn) sued the school because (as a New York Times article paraphrased the lawsuits) they "did not get mandated services and were punished for behavior that arose from their disabilities." According to The New York Times, Achievement First responded that “We serve a substantial number of students with both modest and significant special education needs, and our school leaders, teachers and other professionals work tirelessly each day to serve all our students well [....] Most of our students who receive special education services are experiencing real growth, and we have high levels of overall parent satisfaction." The lawsuit was settled in early 2018.

== New Model ==
In 2016, Achievement First introduced "a new school model that they hope can maintain their high expectations and strict rules, while letting students develop independence and a sense of identity." The model was called Greenfield. The founding principal of a Greenfield school said that, "“Part of the model is addressing the idea that our students need to be prepared for college, and not just prepared academically."

Other adjustments over time include shortening the school day by an hour.
