= Jack Calfee =

American economist

John Edward "Jack" Calfee (March 2, 1941 – February 16, 2011) was an American economist and author. He spent 16 years as a resident scholar for the American Enterprise Institute. Radio host Hugh Hewitt described him as one of the great economic historians and regulatory analysts of the last 50 years. He was known for his work on U.S. Food and Drug Administration regulatory policy and the economics of advertising. Calfee worked as special adviser to Wendy Lee Gramm when she was Head of the Bureau of Economics. He had a degree in mathematics from Rice University, a master's degree in international relations from the University of Chicago, and a doctorate in economics from the University of California, Berkeley.

He died on February 16, 2011, at his home in Bethesda, Maryland, after a heart attack.
