= Husik Santurjan =

Husik Santuryan (10 May 1920 – February 1, 2011) was an archbishop of the Armenian Apostolic Church.

Born Azat Santuryan in Sivas, Turkey, he migrated to Soviet Armenia in 1947. Santuryan was ordained a priest in 1956 taking the name Husik, and a bishop in 1962 for the Armenian Apostolic Church.
