= Mehdi Mohammed Zeyo =

Libyan middle manager

Mehdi Mohammed Zeyo محمد
- Born: c. 1962; Libya
- Died: 20 February 2011 (aged 49); Benghazi, Libya
- Cause of death: Altruistic suicide; blew up gates to military base in Benghazi
- Occupations: Middle Manager, National Oil Company

Mehdi Mohammed Zeyo (c. 1962 – 20 February 2011) was a Libyan middle manager for a state oil company in Benghazi, Libya. In the wake of the Libyan Civil War, Zeyo found he could no longer bury the civilian youth killed by Muammar Gaddafi's forces; he subsequently decided to use his car to blow up the gates to a military base in Benghazi. This allowed the civilian oppositional fighters to overrun the base and claim Benghazi as an oppositional stronghold in the Libyan Civil War.

== Background ==
NPR reporter Lourdes Garcia-Navarro describes Zeyo as "the most unlikely hero of the Libyan Civil War." As an older gentleman of 49 amongst the youth democracy protesters, the middle-manager for a state oil company joined the peaceful protest movement as soon as it began.
