= Jon Fitch (politician) =

American politician

Jonathan Stuart "Jon" Fitch (June 8, 1950 – February 26, 2011) was an American politician from Arkansas.

== Biography ==
Fitch was born in Fayetteville, Arkansas. He graduated from the University of Arkansas in 1973. He lived in Hindsville, Arkansas and was a farmer. Fitch was a Democratic member of the Arkansas House of Representatives and member of the Arkansas Senate; All together, Fitch served 22 years in the Arkansas General Assembly, 18 of which were in the Senate. In 2007, Fitch was appointed by then-Governor Mike Beebe to serve as the Director of the Arkansas Livestock and Poultry Commission, a position which he held until his death in February 2011. Fitch was inducted into the Arkansas Agricultural Hall of Fame as part of Class XXV. He died at the University of Arkansas Medical Sciences in Little Rock, Arkansas.
