= Welsh Sinfonia =

Cardiff-based chamber orchestra

The Welsh Sinfonia is a professional chamber orchestra based in Cardiff and is a full member of the Association of British Orchestras. It employs between 15 and 35 musicians, led by Robin Stowell. The Principal Conductor and Artistic Director is Mark Eager.

The Welsh Sinfonia's Patron is the George Windsor, Earl of St Andrews. World-renowned conductors Tadaaki Otaka and Grant Llewellyn are International President and UK President respectively.

The orchestra was relaunched in 2009 after serving choirs and choral societies for 20 years, and now concentrates on exploring the ever-widening chamber music repertoire, from the 16th century to the present day.

The Welsh Sinfonia performs regularly in a popular Cardiff series of concerts at the Dora Stoutzker Hall, RWCMD, and tours Wales taking chamber music to smaller venues and areas where live classical music provision is limited. The orchestra also works closely with schools offering an interactive education programme.

The Welsh Sinfonia has commissioned and performed many new works for chamber orchestra. Recent works include Damian Rees ‘Happily Ever After’, Eilir Owen Griffiths ‘The Emoticons of Time’ (Percussion Concerto), Rhian Samuel ‘The Path through the Woods’ (Recorder Concerto), John Hardy (composer) and RWCMD students: "Night Flight" and in 2013 Roxanna Panufnik: "Orchestrapaedia" and Michael Csányi-Wills "On the Idle Hill of Summer". There are developing links with emerging Welsh musicians including the ex Official Harpist to the Prince of Wales Claire Jones, Soprano Rhiannon Llewellyn and percussionist Dave Danford. Other international soloists have included recorder virtuoso Pamela Thorby, the 'doyen of period clarinettists' Colin Lawson and Tenor Nicholas Mulroy.
