= Roy McEwan-Brown =

Scottish supporter of the arts

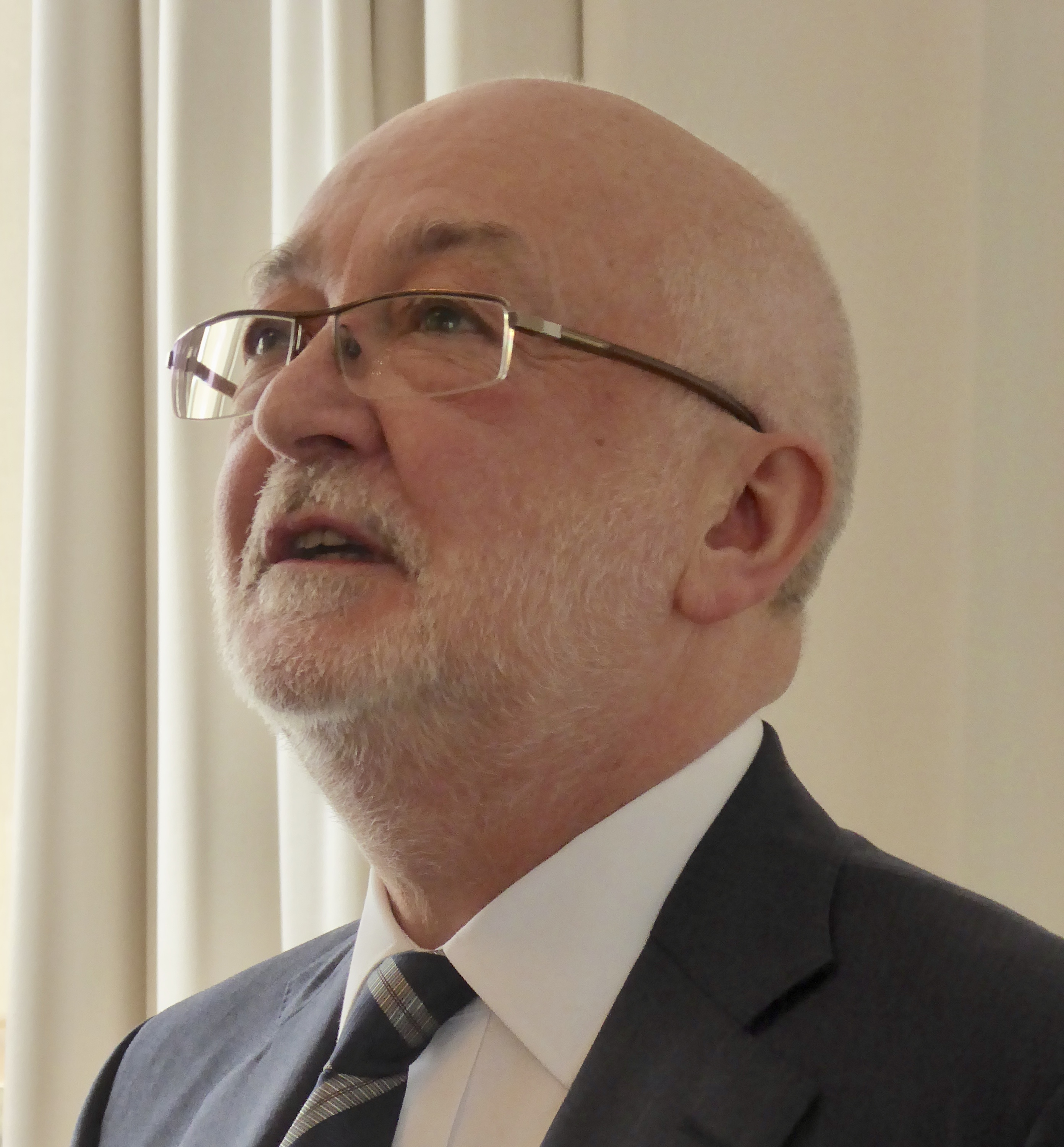
McEwan-Brown

Roy McEwan-Brown is a Scottish supporter of the arts.

== Career ==
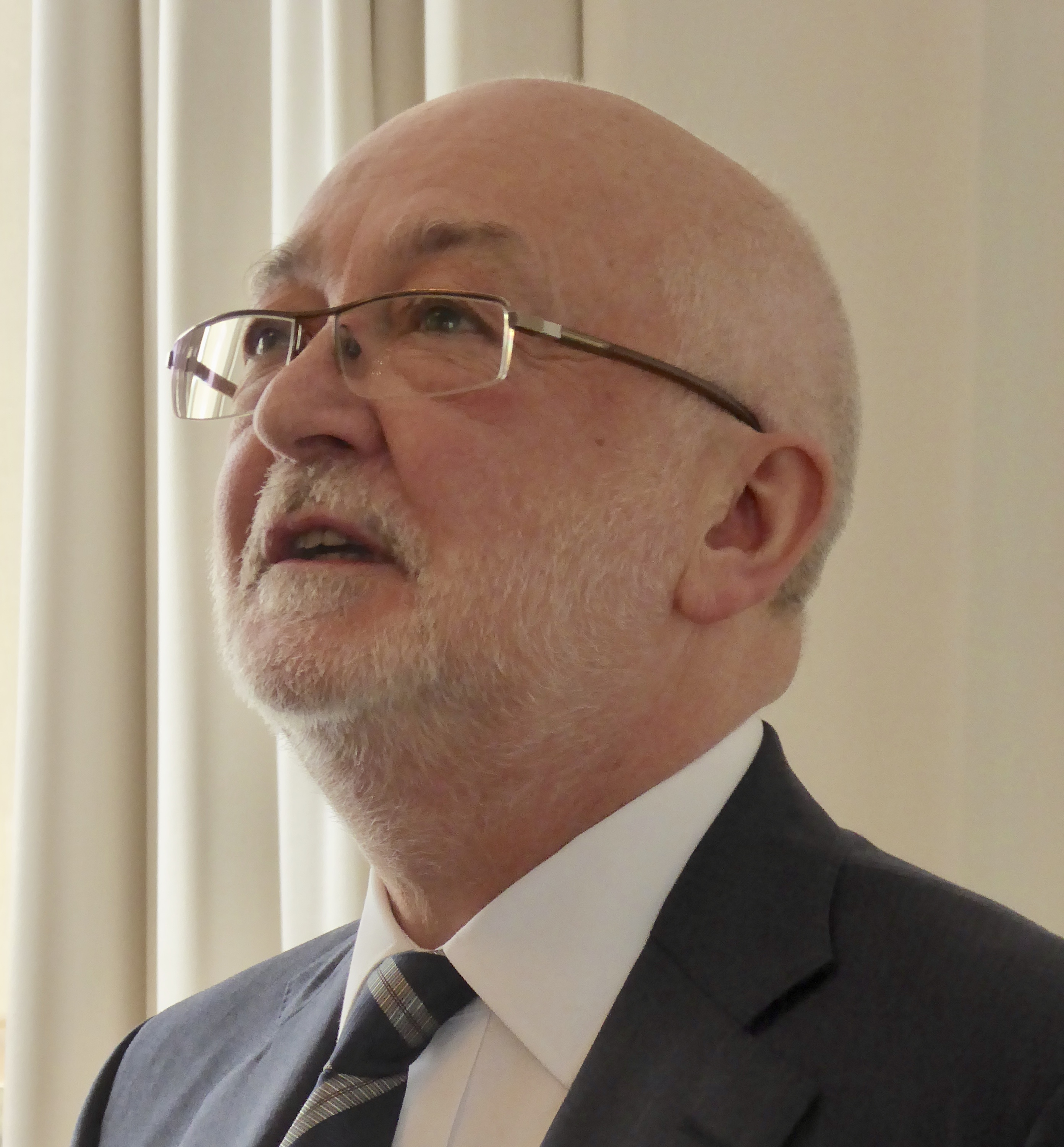
Roy McEwan-Brown accepting the honour of Knight, 1st Class, of the Order of the Lion of Finland

McEwan-Brown was Chief Executive of the Scottish Chamber Orchestra from 1993 until he retired in 2016, a period during which the Orchestra flourished through relationships with Sir Charles Mackerras, Joseph Swensen and Robin Ticciati.

He served as Director of the MacRobert Arts Centre at the University of Stirling from 1982 to 1991. He was Director of Arts Development at Northwest Arts Board from 1991 until 1993. He served on the boards of the Association of British Orchestras (1993–2003), the Scottish Arts Council (2003–2007), as well as several of its committees. He was the founder Chair of the Glasgow audience development agency, Glasgow Grows Audiences (2004–2010), and a member of the Board of The Traverse Theatre (2011–2017). He is a graduate of the London School of Economics and lives in St Boswells in the Scottish Borders with his husband, Svend McEwan-Brown, artistic director of East Neuk Festival.

== Retirement ==
McEwan-Brown currently serves as vice-chair of SAGE Gateshead and as a Trustee of The Dewar Arts Awards. He also serves as an advisor on the selection of UK City of Culture 2021.

== Recognition ==
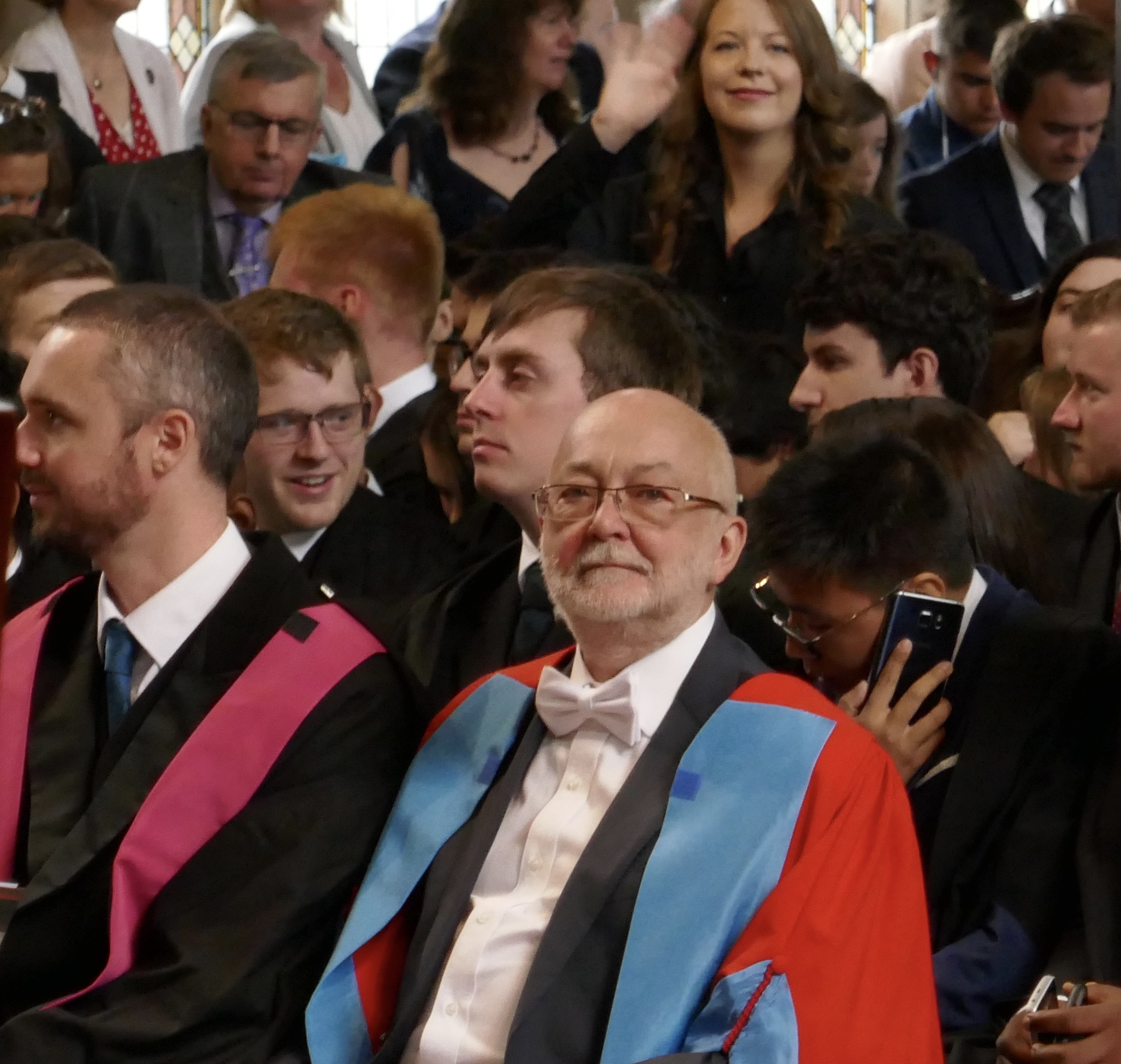

Roy McEwan was awarded an OBE in 2011. His lifelong love of Finnish music and culture was recognised in 2016 with the honour of Knight First Class of the Order of the Lion of Finland. In January 2017 the Association of British Orchestras awarded him the ABO Special Award 2017 for services to the orchestral sector. In June 2017 he received an Honorary Doctorate of Music from the University of Glasgow.
