= Jacqueline Froom =

English lyricist and poet (1929–2018)

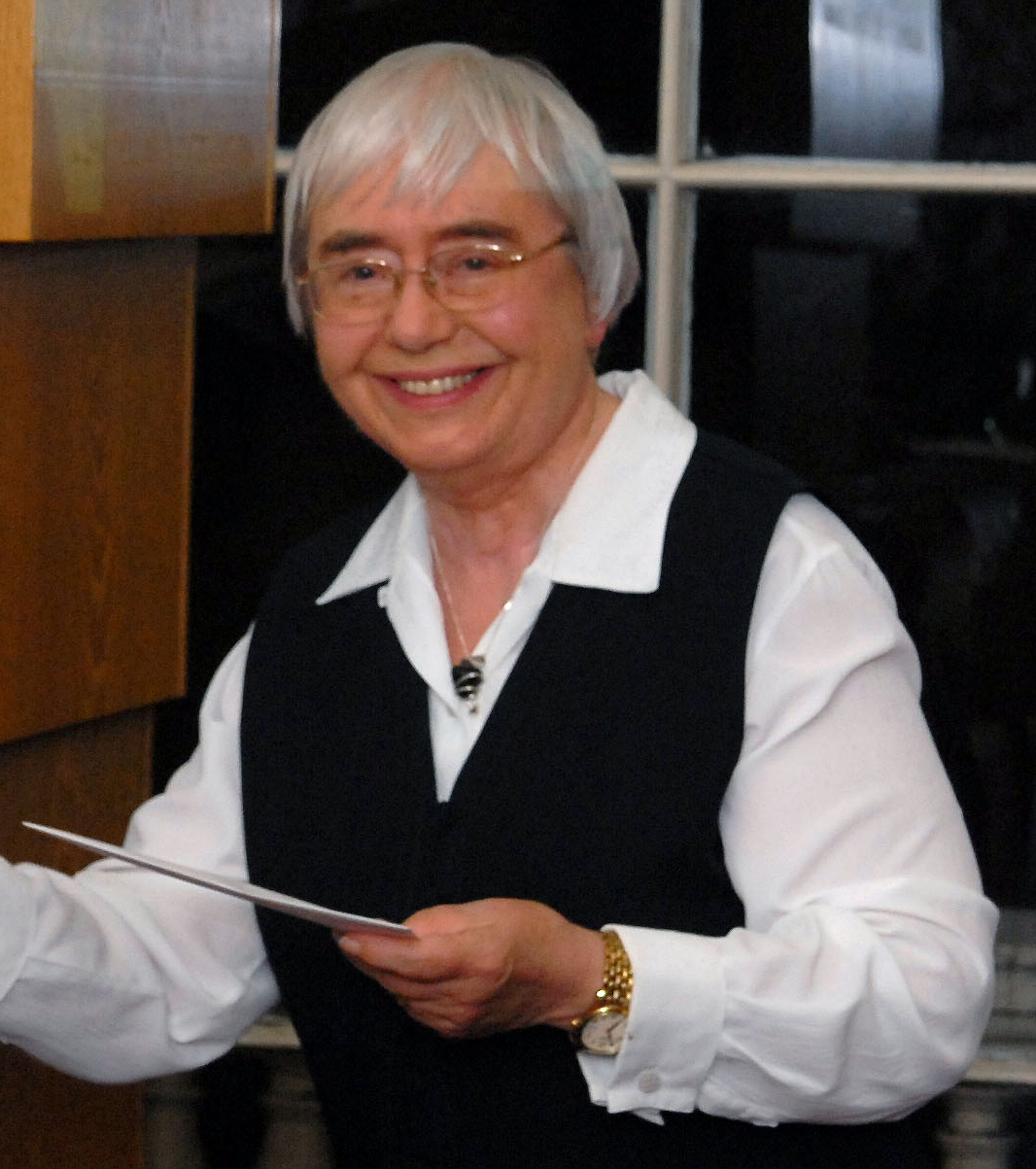
- Froom in 2008
- Born: 14 January 1929; Croydon, London, England, UK
- Died: 24 February 2018 (aged 89)
- Education: Whyteleafe School for Girls; University of Sussex
- Occupations: Poet, librettist, event organizer
- Years active: 1960–2011
- Notable work: Diva’s Lament, A Garden of Weeds, A Song for your Supper
- Spouse: Jonathan Hinden
- Children: 1
- Awards: 2nd prize in the 2008 Keats-Shelley Prize for Poetry

Jacqueline Mary Froom (14 January 1929 – 24 February 2018), (also known as Jackie Froom and published as Jackie Hinden), was a British poet, lyricist, and teacher. She was the co-creator and organizer of the Summer Music summer school in Bexhill-on-Sea, East Sussex.

== Biography ==
Jacqueline Froom was born in Croydon in 1929, the only child of Sidney and Kathleen Froom. Her father was a civil servant at the Admiralty. She attended Whyteleafe School for Girls and had planned to attend university. In the late 1940s, returning servicemen took most of the university places, and she did not secure a place.

Froom attended the Central School of Speech and Drama before taking up a secretarial post with the Radio Times. She then continued in publishing, spending several years with Brockhampton Press and ultimately serving as an assistant to the Music Editor at Oxford University Press. While there, she met several composers, including Alun Hoddinott, Kenneth Leighton and Graham Treacher, and began writing texts and translations for them.

Froom met Jonathan Hinden, the son of Rita Hinden a member of the music staff at Glyndebourne, when he was the accompanist for her singing class, and they married in 1968. In the same year, she started the annual Summer Music Summer School with her friend Murray Gordon, which continued until 2005.

Froom became an enthusiastic Bridge player, obtained an Area Community Service Employment and Training Council qualification and taught Bridge and Creative Writing for the local Adult Education in Brighton. She played for one of the Sussex County teams.

Froom received a Master of Arts in Creative Writing from the University of Sussex. At 63, she was their oldest student.

In her later years, Froom concentrated on poetry. She won several competitions, notably second place in the 2008 Keats-Shelley Prize for Poetry, and published a volume of her poems.

== Summer Music Summer School ==
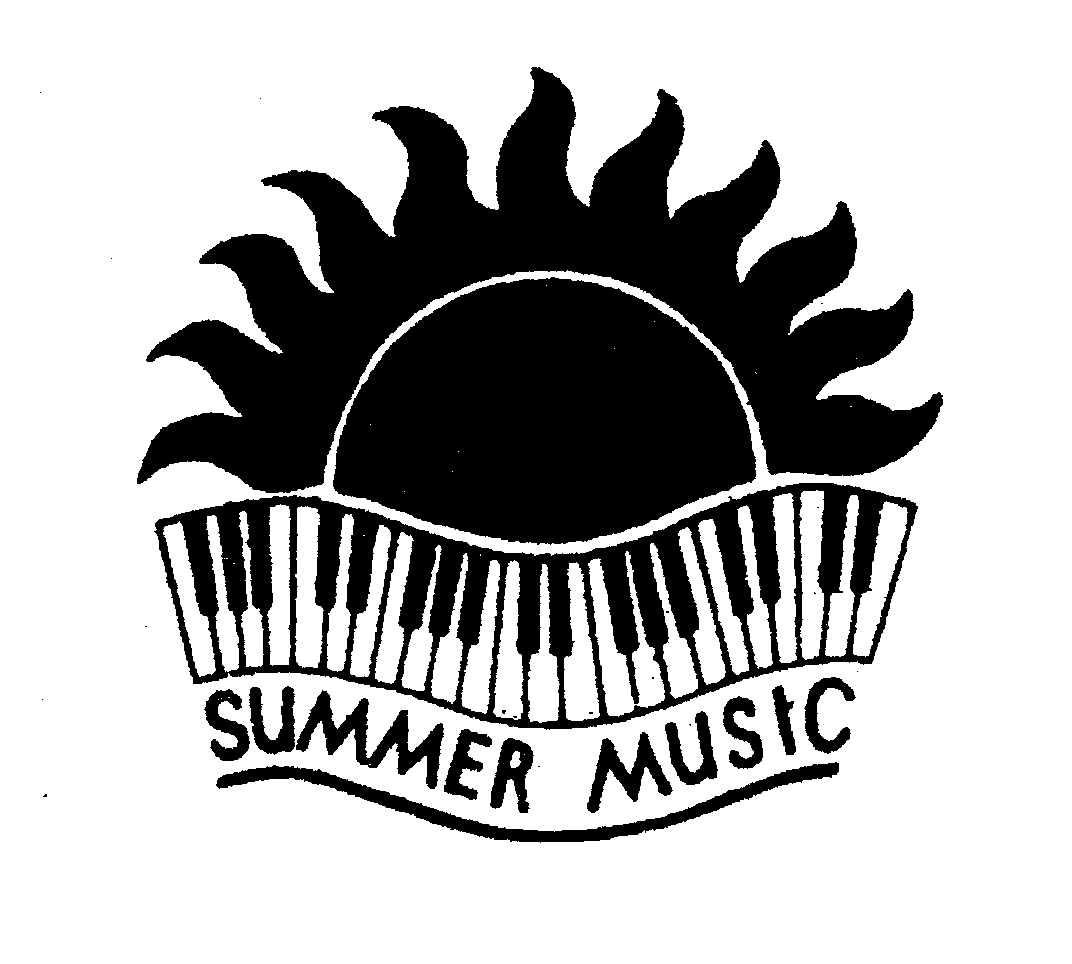
Summer Music logo

In the late 1960s, Froom attended various music courses with her friend Murray Gordon, and they started running residential weekends. In 1968, they started the Summer Music summer school for singers and string players in Bexhill-on-Sea.

The summer school grew into a major annual event reaching its peak in the late 1980s, with approximately 300 students. There were also courses for accompanists, guitarists and children. It was notable for the family feeling it retained to the end, and there was great loyalty among the students and the tutors. Several regulars met their life partners there and returned with their children. The Summer School relocated to Herstmonceux, Bushey and Wellington College, ending at Ardingly College. When Murray Gordon retired in the early 1990s, Froom continued with Jonathan Hinden taking over the programming and business sides.

== Works ==
=== Poems ===
Froom's collection of 61 poems and lyrics, Parallel Mirrors, was published in 2011 under her married name, Jackie Hinden.

=== Published by OUP ===
Whilst working for Oxford University Press, Froom provided texts and translations for several musical settings, all published by OUP:

- "Four noëls" (1963) music by Arthur Oldham
- "God's blacksmith" music by Zoltán Kodály
- "See the Gipsies" (1960) music by Zoltán Kodály
- "Gypsy Lament" (1961) music by Zoltán Kodály
- "The Swallow’s Wooing" (1961) music by Zoltán Kodály
- "Three Wise Kings" (1961) music by Arnold Cook
- "The Tree Woodmen" melody, an old French folksong, arranged by Caesar Geoffrey
- "Open my Heart" (1961) melody by Johann Sebastian Bach arranged by Lionel Lethbridge
- "Children’s Songs of Spain" (1966) arranged by Sebastian H. Brown
- "Four Carols from Abroad" (1961) arranged by Graham Treacher
- "What Tidings?" (Opus 38 No. 1) by Alun Hoddinott, text by John Audelay adapted by Froom
- "Medieval Carol" (1965) (Opus 38 No. 2) by Alun Hoddinott

=== With Terence Greaves ===
In the late 1960s and early 1970s, Froom worked closely with the composer Terence Greaves, producing three significant works:

- "A Garden of Weeds" for Soprano, clarinet and piano (1971) re-published Emerson Edition in 2003. In a review of a performance of the piece in March 2019, Simon Jenner noted: “Jacqueline Froom’s poem explores the nature of this poisonous Deadly Nightshade. It’s a strange, tenebrous poem set in an equally taut setting, with a fine diminuendo at the end."
- "Tinker Tailor – Eight Songs for voice and piano" (1965)
- "Arachne: A musical play for girls" (1967)

=== With Betty Roe ===
Froom worked in partnership with composer Betty Roe to produce a range of works for various forces.

- "Euphonium Dance" from Two Jazz Songs (1972)
- "Ghouls and Ghosts" (1973) for solo soprano, vocal quartet and clarinet quintet. Unpublished except for the song The Phantom of the Opera.
- "Daughters of Eve" (1974) unpublished
- "Merry be Man" (1974), a Christmas sequence
- London Fantasies for medium voice and double bass (1992) – 1. Thames – a tempo, 2. Legato Leicester Square, 3. Pizzicato Piccadilly
- "Diva’s Lament" (1995) – Described by Musicroom.com as "an entertainingly regretful song with a hilarious climax – suitable for any aging stage star feeling a little over the hill!"
- "A Song for Your Supper" (1998) – 1. Aperitif, 2. Shrimp Cocktail, 3. Coq au Vin, 4. Summer Pudding, 5. Peach Melba (alternative desert), 6. Cheese and Biscuits
- "Domestics – six choral cameos" (1999) 1. Frogs, 2. Mouse, 3. Seagull, 4. Ants, 5. Cat, 6. Spider

== Discography ==
A number of the works to which Froom provided the texts have been recorded:

- "Diva's Lament" (1995) music by Betty Roe performed on The Silver Hound and Other Songs by Sarah Leonard and Nigel Foster
- "O God, enfold me in the sun" (1967) music by Kenneth Leighton
- "What Tidings?" (1966) Op. 38 The Elizabethan Singers, Louis Halsey – Carols of Today
- "God's Blacksmith" (1970) Orpington Junior Singers – The Glorious Voices of the Orpington Junior Singers
- "See The Gypsies" (1976) The Zimriyah Choir – Hear Our Voice (Shema Kolenu)
- "The Flea And The Mouse" (1978) – Silver Burdett Music, Book 1
