= John Hardy (composer) =

British composer

John Hardy (born 1957) is an English-born composer who has been commissioned by the Arts Council/National Lottery, the BBC, Welsh National Opera and the BBC National Orchestra of Wales, among others. His work includes opera, choral and orchestral pieces, site-specific theatre events and film.

Hardy studied at Hereford Cathedral School, Oxford University and Guildhall School of Music & Drama before directing music at Cardiff Laboratory Theatre, Edington Festival then Welsh performance group Brith Gof, whose 1988 production Gododdin was performed with percussion group Test Dept and described by The Independent as "elemental, wild and exhilarating… an exceptional achievement.”

In 1994 Hardy won the first of his five BAFTA Cymru awards for the soundtrack to Hedd Wyn, an Oscar-nominated film about the Welsh poet. At this time he began collaborating with playwright Ed Thomas, composing music for Song From A Forgotten City (1995), House of America (1996), Gas Station Angel (1998) and Stone City Blue (2004).

Music Theatre Wales commissioned and in 1994 premiered Flowers, a chamber opera described as "rich and evocative" by Opera, "communicating... the whole gamut of human emotions" by The Times and by Steven Walsh in The Independent as "a strong piece that seems to do what it sets out to... with terrific conviction, with a flair for torturous sonic imagery, and with no hint that the composer is not in complete control of his materials."

Further opera commissions followed with The Roswell Incident for Music Theatre Wales and Mis Du Bach/Black February for Welsh National Opera, produced and performed at Abergwaun/Fishguard, the site of the last invasion of Britain, in collaboration with the local community.

In 1998 De Profundis was commissioned for Westminster Abbey Choir, BBC Singers and London Brass to end a concert celebrating the unveiling of ten new statues of international martyrs. Fever was commissioned for the Royal Liverpool Philharmonic at Last Night of the Welsh Proms in 2000.

The BBC National Orchestra of Wales have commissioned several works including A.C.T.I.O.N. – sing Wales 2000 for performance with 800 school children; Fighting the Clock composed with Luke Carver Goss, school children from Beddau and members of the orchestra, first performed in 2000 and broadcast on BBC Radio 3; and Blue Letters from Tanganyika which was toured, recorded, broadcast on Radio 3 many times and released on Hardy's own label Ffin Records in 2009.

Not Darkness But Twilight was written for the BBC National Chorus of Wales and performed at St. David's Cathedral Festival 2004 and Wyastone Concert Hall. In 2006 Arts Council Wales granted a Creative Wales Award and the choral cycle Spaces: Beyond the End of the World was written for Serendipity, Only Men Aloud! and Vivace Singers.

Chamber works include Fol-de-Riddles: Fanfares for 4 Fiddles commissioned by Madeleine Mitchell for the first Red Violin Festival in 1997 and broadcast on BBC Radio 3; Fflamau Oer: Songs for Jeremy, commissioned by Jeremy Huw Williams with a selection recorded for Sain; Still Water for Philip Heyman and Snorri's Pool for Lowri Morgan.

During 2007 Hardy's group Ensembl8 performed his own new and existing arranged music with live electronics and video projection. In 2009 the BBC Concert Orchestra commissioned music for a composite piece by composers including Pet Shop Boys, Anne Dudley and Will Gregory, performed at Queen Elizabeth Hall and broadcast on Radio 3.

In 2010 Hardy became Head of Contemporary Music at the Royal Welsh College of Music & Drama. Recent and future commissions include music for a new production of The Persians in the inaugural season of National Theatre Wales.

== Selected works ==
- Pax (1990, oratorio)
- Haearn (1992, oratorio)
- Flowers (1994, opera)
- Mis Du Bach / Black February (1997, opera)
- Blue Letters from Tanganyika (1997, orchestra)
- The Roswell Incident (1997, opera)
- Kennst du das Land? (1997, soprano and piano)
- Fol-de-riddles: Fanfares for 4 fiddles (1997, violins)
- Archaeologies: Wild Wales (myths & legends) (1998, wind quintet)
- The Waltz is Over (1998, soprano and ensemble)
- ... on the way to heaven (1998, soprano and piano)
- De Profundis (1998, SATB chorus, brass and percussion)
- Fflamau Oer: songs for Jeremy (1999, baritone and piano)
- Fighting The Clock (with Luke Carver Goss, 2000, orchestra)
- A.C.T.I.O.N. – sing Wales 2000 (2000, orchestra and school-children)
- Fever (2000, orchestra)
- Bards of Wales/Beirdd Cymru (2003, SATB chorus, trumpet, harp and narrator)
- Not Darkness But Twilight (2004, SATB chorus with organ, harp and percussion)
- joywithinsects (2005, SATB chorus)
- La-la Land (2005, SATB chorus)
- When We Let Spirit Lead Us (2005, SATB chorus)
- Still Water (2005, viola and piano)
- Luminous Water (2005, viola and piano)
- Spaces – Beyond the End of the World (2006, song cycle for combinations of SATB chorus with organ, piano, harp and percussion)
