= Nigel Foster (pianist) =

British musician

Nigel Foster is an English piano accompanist with a particular interest in the art song repertoire. He has performed in the UK and Europe, in Asia (Japan, Malaysia), and the Americas (USA, Canada, Colombia), and in 2008 toured New Zealand. He has appeared on radio and television in the UK and Europe, including song recitals on Classic FM and the soundtrack of the film L'homme est une femme comme les autres.

Foster studied piano at the Royal Academy of Music, at the Guildhall School of Music and Drama and privately with Roger Vignoles. At both the Academy and the Guildhall, he won numerous prizes and awards for piano accompaniment. He was rehearsal pianist for Sir Georg Solti towards the end of Solti's career. Although he has worked with other instrumentalists (notably violinist Madeleine Mitchell) it is for his work with singers that Foster is best known; he works closely with Sarah Walker in the Guildhall's vocal department and has performed and recorded with singers including Walker, Neil Jenkins, Yvonne Kenny, Philip Langridge, Jane Manning, Ian Partridge, Stephen Varcoe.

He is a frequent performer at the Wigmore Hall, the South Bank Centre, the Barbican Arts Centre, and St John Smith Square in London, and at St David's Hall, Cardiff, and has also worked with several opera companies including Glyndebourne. He has played for masterclasses for Sarah Walker, Sherrill Milnes, Nelly Miricioiu, Thomas Hampson, Tom Krause, Stuart Burrows, and Ileana Cotrubas.

His musical interests are varied, encompassing all periods from early music to contemporary compositions, and working with opera and lieder singers. He has premiered works by John Metcalf, Alun Hoddinott, Richard Causton, Julian Philips, Edward Rushton, Arlene Sierra and Huw Watkins.

His recordings include accompanying Jeremy Huw Williams, Marina Tafur, the Dolmetsch Ensemble, and collections of English song with Stephen Varcoe.
