= Danford =

Danford is both a surname and a given name. Notable people with the name include:

== Surname ==
- Ben Danford (born 2006), Canadian ice hockey player
- Dave Danford (born 1984), British percussionist
- Harry Danford (born c. 1939), Politician in Ontario
- Lorenzo Danford (1829–1899), U.S. Representative from Ohio
- Ryan Danford (born 1985), Professional American Halo player

== Given name ==
- Arnold Danford Patrick Heeney (1902–1970), Canadian lawyer, diplomat and civil servant
- Danford Balch (1811–1859), Oregon pioneer
- Danford N. Barney (1808–1874), American expressman
- Danford B. Greene (1928–2015), American film and television editor
- Samuel Danford Nicholson (1859–1923), United States Senator

== See also ==
- Danford iris (Iris danfordiae), bulbous perennial, in the species in the genus Iris
- Samuel Danford Farm, historic complex of buildings in northeastern Noble County, Ohio, United States
