= Rhian Samuel =

Welsh composer (born 1944)

- Born: 1944 (age 81–82); Aberdare, Wales
- Occupation: Composer

Rhian Samuel (born Aberdare, Wales, 1944) is a Welsh composer who resided in the USA for many years. She has composed over 140 published works, including orchestral, chamber, vocal, and choral music. She now divides her time between mid-Wales and London. She currently resides in the coastal town of Aberdyfi.

== Composition ==
Samuel's orchestral music spans from Elegy-Symphony (St. Louis Symphony Orchestra, Leonard Slatkin, cond., 1981) to Tirluniau/Landscapes (BBC commission, BBC NOW, BBC Proms 2000); in 1983 she won the ASCAP/Rudolf Nissim Prize (USA) for her choral/orchestral work, La Belle Dame sans Merci. A BIS CD containing her BBC-commissioned work for soprano and orchestra, Clytemnestra, was short listed for a Gramophone Award in 2020. She has also written about music: as co-editor of the New Grove (Norton) Dictionary of Women Composers, she has been prominent on issues concerning the reception of music by women. She has also written on the operas of Harrison Birtwistle; she was commissioned by the Royal Opera House, Covent Garden, to write programme essays on both Gawain and The Minotaur and subsequently published diaries of their first productions.

Her Path Through the Woods for recorder and strings was premiered at Temple of Peace, Cardiff, in April 2011 by Pamela Thorby and the Welsh Sinfonia, conducted by Mark Eager.

== Education ==
Samuel was educated at Reading University (BA, BMus) in the UK and Washington University in St. Louis (MA, PhD), and joined the teaching staff of City University, London in 1995, where she became Professor of Music in 1999 and is now Emeritus Professor. While there, she also supervised the research of post-graduate students at the Guildhall School of Music and Drama. Later, she taught composition at Magdalen College, Oxford (2007–2016). Previously, she taught at the University of Reading (1984–95, as Head of Department, 1993–95) and at the St. Louis Conservatory, St. Louis.
