= Classical Music (magazine) =

Classical music magazine

- Frequency: Monthly
- First issue: 25 September 1976
- Company: Rhinegold Publishing
- Country: United Kingdom
- Based in: London
- Website: Official site
- ISSN: 0961-2696

Classical Music is a trade magazine for the classical music industry. It co-sponsors the annual ABO/Rhinegold Awards for backstage work in music, held for the first time in January 2012, and has a network of correspondents worldwide.

Its website includes news on the classical music industry. The magazine published an account of the interruption by protesters of the Jerusalem Quartet's concert at London's Wigmore Hall on 29 March 2010. It was published by Rhinegold Publishing, and is now published by the Mark Allen Group.

Previous editions have been co-edited by industry experts, including Deborah Annetts (Incorporated Society of Musicians), Julian Lloyd-Webber and Bob Chilcott.

== History ==
Classical Music started out as Classical Music Weekly, launched under editor Trevor Richardson in 1976. In a retrospective for the 500th issue, he wrote, "CMW was printed on the same presses as Private Eye at the Socialist Workers Press in Bethnal Green ... We worked hard, laughed a lot and panicked frequently."

After nine months, Rhinegold Publishing took over the title, changing the frequency to fortnightly. After a further nine months, as Classical Music & Album Review, in 1979 it was given the title Classical Music.

The second editor of the magazine, Robert Maycock, held the position from September 1977 to June 1986. He was succeeded by Graeme Kay, who was in turn succeeded by Keith Clarke in 1991, followed by Kimon Daltas, who took over in 2013. In 2017, Ashutosh Khandekar and Owen Mortimer took over the title as managing editors.

Past members of the magazine's editorial team include Richard Morrison, chief music critic at The Times, BBC Radio 3 presenter Graeme Kay, opera producer Mike Ashman and Fleet Street arts correspondent Dalya Alberge.
