= The Electrification of the Soviet Union =

The Electrification of the Soviet Union is an opera in two acts by Nigel Osborne. The libretto was written by Craig Raine and based on The Last Summer and Spectorsky, two semi-autobiographical works by Boris Pasternak who appears as a narrator in the opera. It was commissioned for Glyndebourne by the BBC and premiered by the Glyndebourne Touring Opera in 1987 in a production directed by Peter Sellars. In 2002, it was given a new chamber production by Music Theatre Wales and toured the UK, including performances at the Cheltenham International Festival and the Buxton Festival.
