= London Chamber Ensemble =

Flexible ensemble of UK chamber musicians

The London Chamber Ensemble
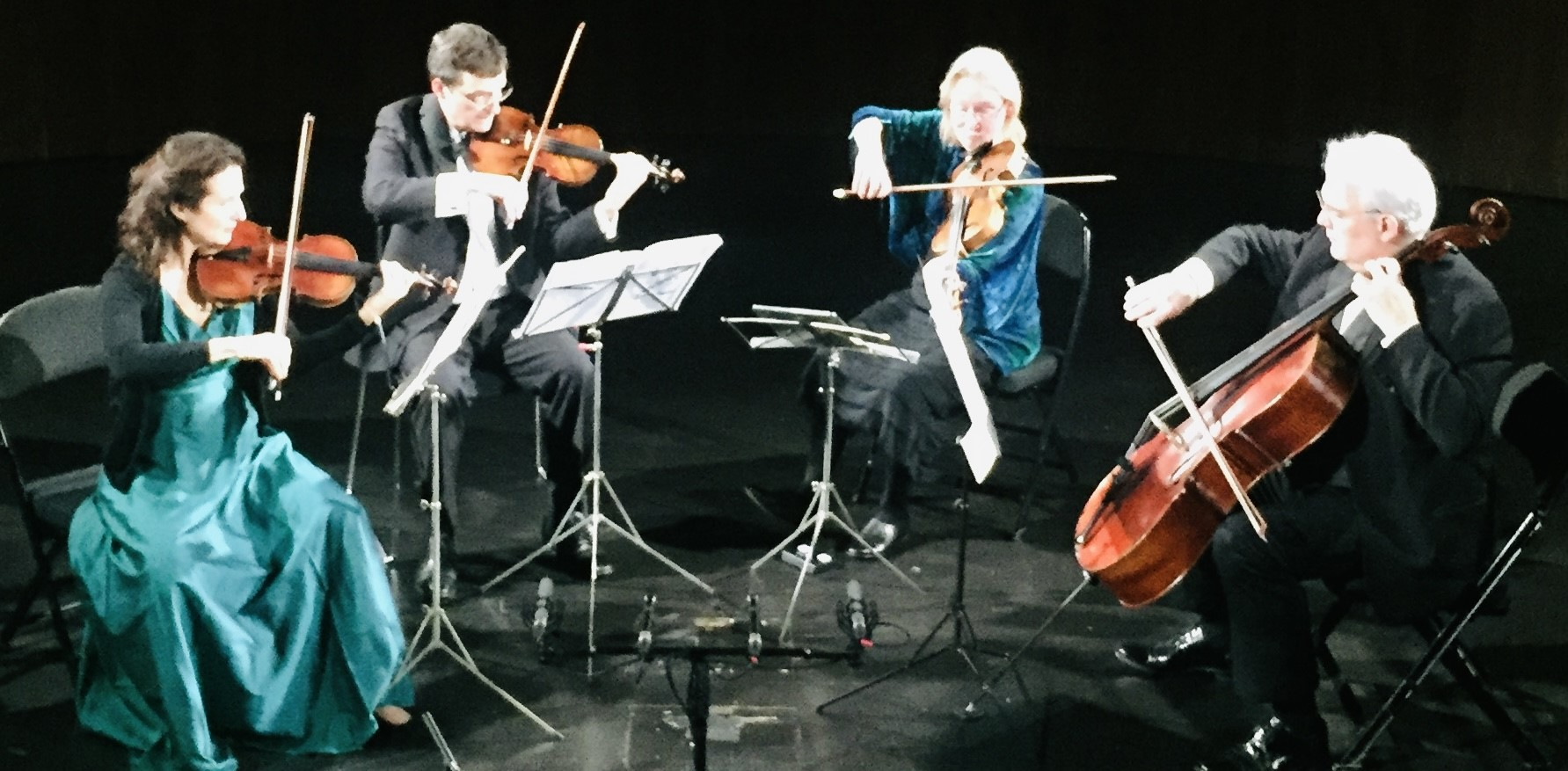

Background information
- Origin: London, United Kingdom
- Genres: Classical
- Years active: 1992-present
- Members: Madeleine Mitchell (violin); Gordon MacKay (violin); Bridget Carey (viola); Joseph Spooner (cello)

The London Chamber Ensemble is a flexible ensemble of 3-12 players, including voice, comprising some of the UK's most outstanding chamber musicians, with a permanent core string quartet since 2018. Their album 'Howells & Wood Quartets' (all first recordings) was released on the SOMM label on 18 October 2024.

== History ==
LCE was formed by Madeleine Mitchell in 1992, initially at the request of the Vale of Glamorgan Festival, to perform Quatuor pour la fin du temps by Messiaen, going on to perform at the BBC Proms (with Mitchell and Joanna MacGregor's arrangement of Bach, the last of the Art of Fugue). Their recording of the Messiaen (using their individual names), along with Quatuor pour la Naissance by Krauze, was the widely recommended version of the work for many years. "An all star group which manages to outdo all its rivals" - Gramophone.

After the death of cellist Christopher Van Kampen, the ensemble expanded for many other concerts and broadcasts including festivals and music clubs and programmes for BBC Radio 3, including the Millennium Series and St George's Bristol Russian and Hungarian series. They have also performed in Malta, Spain for National Spanish Radio and for Bulgarian TV. The LCE gave a concert for the Hall for Cornwall International Series, replacing the Academy of St Martin's Chamber Ensemble at short notice, with pianist Huw Watkins. Many of the musicians are professors at conservatoires. LCE's programme with Kyle Horch (saxophone), Madeleine Mitchell (violin) and Nigel Clayton (piano) of jazz inspired music - Gershwin An American in Paris ("in Mitchell's own highly effective arrangement" - The Times), Shostakovitch Jazz Suite and Weill Little Threepenny Music - was performed at St John's Smith Square Americana Season on American Independence Day 2018. Madeleine was asked by the Alwyn Trust to put together an album for Naxos in 2006 of William Alwyn Chamber Music and Song, all first recordings. This was followed by the London Chamber Ensemble album for Naxos/BMS of Grace Williams Chamber Music, all world premiere recordings, which was Guardian 'CD of the Week' and no.2 in the Classical Charts on release on International Women's Day 2019. It was also featured by The Violin Channel, The Strad, WTJU FM, Classical CD Choice, The Art Music Lounge, The Financial Times, Music Web International, Limelight Magazine and was Norman Lebrecht's 'Disc of the Week'. They presented this music in the Beaumaris and other festivals following this release. "Passionate and persuasive advocacy..more please" - Gramophone.

The LCE were invited to appear in the Southbank Centre's International Chamber Music Season 2020/21 in Mitchell's programme 'A Century of Music by UK Women' 1921–2021, including a world premiere by Errollyn Wallen CBE. This was live streamed from St John's Smith Square on International Women's Day, supported by the RVW and Ambache Trusts with coverage on BBC Radio 4, Radio 3, Classic FM, Arcana FM, Scala Radio, British Music Society, The Guardian, The Independent, BBC Music Magazine, The Strad Premiere of the Month and Musical Opinion: "very fine performances of a broad range of fresh and rewarding repertoire...the players brought energy, precision and interpretative imagination".

The LCE's director Madeleine Mitchell won a Royal Philharmonic Society Enterprise Award in 2022 for her creative project linking art and music in film, including her Anglo-Russian LCE String Quartet introduced concert programme with the V&A exhibition Fabergé: Romance to Revolution, returning to the V&A for a sold-out concert during the Chanel exhibition, 2023. The quartet recorded a work by Effy Efthimiou in 2022. They opened Kensington & Chelsea Music Society 2022/23 season in the newly refurbished Leighton House with Quartet no.5 by Joseph Horovitz (in tribute to the composer who died in 2022) and Brahms Clarinet Quintet. In 2023 they gave the premiere of the newly discovered original version of Herbert Howells String Quartet no.3 In Gloucestershire with Schubert String Quintet for the Schubert Society of Great Britain
