= Alun Hoddinott =

Welsh composer (1929–2008)

Alun Hoddinott CBE
- Born: 11 August 1929; Bargoed, Glamorganshire, Wales
- Died: 12 March 2008 (aged 78); Swansea, Wales

Alun Hoddinott CBE (11 August 1929 – 12 March 2008) was a Welsh composer of classical music, one of the first to receive international recognition.

== Life and works ==
Hoddinott was born in Bargoed, Glamorganshire, Wales. He was educated at Gowerton Grammar school before matriculating to University College, Cardiff, and later studied privately with Arthur Benjamin. His first major composition, the Clarinet Concerto, was performed at the Cheltenham Festival of 1954 by Gervase de Peyer with the Hallé Orchestra and Sir John Barbirolli.

This brought Hoddinott a national profile, which was followed by a string of commissions by leading orchestras and soloists. These commissions continued up to his death, and he was championed by some of the most distinguished singers and instrumentalists of the 20th century. These include singers such as Dame Margaret Price, Dame Gwyneth Jones, Sir Thomas Allen, Jill Gomez, Sir Geraint Evans and more recently Claire Booth, Helen Field, Gail Pearson and Jeremy Huw Williams. Instrumentalists have included Ruggiero Ricci, Mstislav Rostropovich, Dennis Brain, Osian Ellis, Cecil Aronowitz, Nia Harries, Roger Woodward and John Ogdon to name a few, and more recently euphonium player David Childs, cellist Kathryn Price, trombonist Mark Eager and song pianist Andrew Matthews-Owen.

Hoddinott was prolific, writing symphonies, sonatas, and concertos: his style evolved over a long and distinguished career, from the neo-classicism of the Clarinet Concerto to a brand of serialism which allowed a tonal framework to the structure, combining a penchant for dark textures and brooding harmonies similar to that of another British composer, Alan Rawsthorne, with Bartokian arch-forms and palindromes. However, his move into opera from 1970 helped to broaden his stylistic range and lighten his palette. His music often displays a brooding, darkly lyrical intensity, manifested in his nocturnal slow movements. One of the best examples is his rhapsodic Poem for violin and orchestra, inspired by a line from James Joyce, The Heaventree of Stars. Combining tough, disciplined writing with a sense of the mysterious and unknown, his musical style has been described as "modernist romantic".

Alun Hoddinott was also a gifted teacher and, as Professor of Music at University College, Cardiff, was responsible for the expansion of the Department of Music (with a purpose-built building) which became the largest in Europe in the 1980s. Hoddinott taught a number of talented composers during his time at Cardiff, including the Irish composer John Buckley and Welsh composers Karl Jenkins, Jeffrey Lewis, Gwyn Parry-Jones, John Metcalf and Christopher Painter.

He was awarded honorary doctorates from numerous leading musical institutions, including the Royal Academy of Music, the Royal Northern College of Music and the Royal Welsh College of Music & Drama, as well as the Walford Davies Award. He was appointed a Commander of the Order of the British Empire (CBE) in the 1983 New Year Honours.

In 2005, Hoddinott produced a fanfare to be performed at the wedding of Charles, Prince of Wales, to Camilla Parker Bowles, having previously written works to celebrate Prince Charles' 16th birthday and his investiture.

In 1997 Alun Hoddinott received the Glyndŵr Award for an Outstanding Contribution to the Arts in Wales during the Machynlleth Festival. He also received a Lifetime Achievement Award from the Arts Council of Wales in 1999, and Fellowship of the Welsh Music Guild.

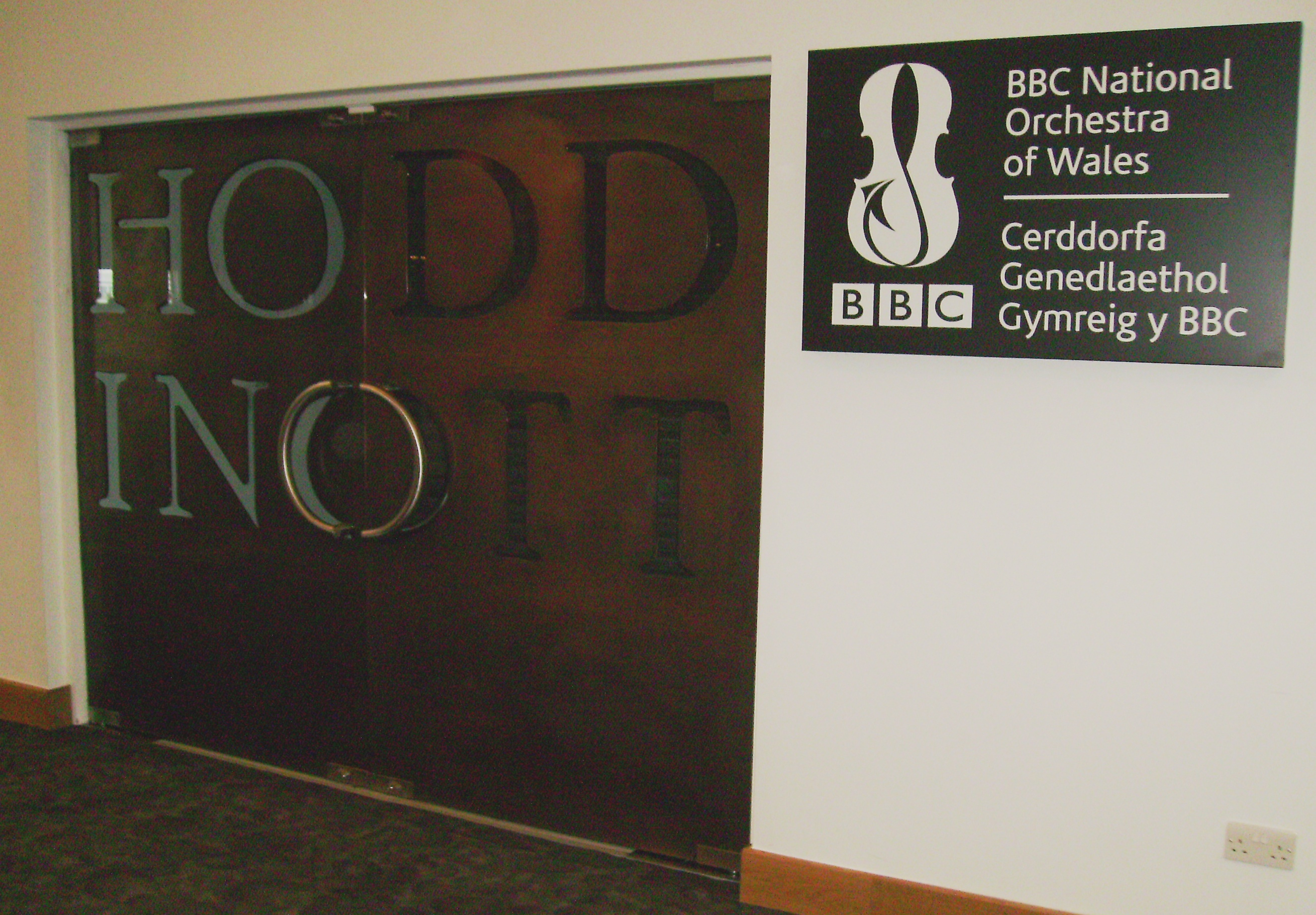
Entrance to the BBC Hoddinott Hall

On 1 March 2007 (Saint David's Day) soprano Helen Field and baritone Jeremy Huw Williams gave the world première of his orchestral song cycle Serenissima with the BBC National Orchestra of Wales at St David's Hall. It was announced on this occasion that the new home of the BBC National Orchestra of Wales in the Wales Millennium Centre in Cardiff would include a specially built 350-seat concert hall, named BBC Hoddinott Hall (Welsh: Neuadd Hoddinott y BBC). The new hall was inaugurated with an opening festival held between 22 January and 1 February 2009, with live performances broadcast on BBC Radio 3. The opening piece was a show piece by Hoddinott himself.

Alun Hoddinott died on 11 March 2008 at Morriston Hospital, Swansea, aged 78, the day after the world première at the Wigmore Hall of his Music for String Quartet, given by the Sacconi Quartet. His very last work, the orchestral tone poem "Taliesin", was premièred by the BBC National Orchestra of Wales at the Swansea Festival of Music in October 2009.

== Chronological worklist ==
- late 1940s two student string quartets
- 1948 Cello Concerto
- 1948 Prelude and fugue for string trio
- 1949 Nocturne for orchestra
- 1950 Op. 1 String Trio
- ? Op. 2 Two Songs for bass voice and piano
- 1953 Op. 3 Clarinet Concerto 1, +str
- 1954 Op. 4/1 Lullaby, voice and piano
- 1954 Op. 4/2 Fugal Overture
- 1953 Op. 5 Nocturne for Orchestra (first published work)
- 1953 Op. 6 Clarinet Quartet
- 1954-5 Op. 7 Symphony 1
- 1955 Op. 8 Concerto for Oboe and Strings
- 1956 Op. 9 Nocturne 1 for piano
- 1956 Op. 10 Septet for clarinet bassoon horn piano violin viola and cello
- 1957 Op. 11 Harp Concerto
- 1957 Op. 12 Rondo Scherzino for trumpet
- 1958 Op. 13 Serenade for String Orchestra
- 1958 Op. 14 Viola Concertino, for Cecil Aronowitz
- 1958 Op. 15 Welsh Dances Suite 1, orch
- 1959 Op. 16/1 Nocturne 2 for piano
- 1958 Op. 16/2 Prelude Nocturne & Dance for harp and strings
- 1958 Two Welsh Dances
- 1959 Op. 17 Piano Sonata 1
- 1959 Op. 18 Sonatina for clavichord
- 1959 Op. 18/3 Elegy for solo piano
- 1959 Op. 19 Piano Concerto 1, +wind orchestra and percussion
- 1960 Op. 20 Sextet
- 1960 Op. 21 Piano Concerto 2
- 1960 Op. 22 Violin Concerto 1
- 1960 Op. 23 The Race of Adam
- 1962 Op. 24 Job (Oratorio)
- 1963 Op. 25 no.3 Rondo Scherzo for orchestra
- ? Op. 26 Rebecca:A Ballad fir SATB choir
- 1961 Op. 27 Piano Sonata 2
- 1961 Op. 29 Symphony 2, for Alan Rawsthorne
- 1961 Op. 30 Christ and Sinful Man
- 1962 Op. 31 Variations for orchestra
- 1962 Folksong Suite, 4movts, orch
- 1962 Op. 32/1 Divertimento, ob cl hn bsn
- 1962 Op. 32/2 Anthem
- 1962 Op. 32/3 Introit
- 1962 Op. 33 Danegeld, SATB choir
- 1963 Op. 34 Sinfonia for strings
- 1964 Op. 35 Jack Straw Overture
- 1964 Op. 36 Harp Sonata
- 1964 Op. 37/1 Toccata alla giga for organ
- 1964 Op. 37/2 Intrada for organ
- 1964 Op. 37/3 Sarum Fanfare for organ
- 1964 Op. 38/1 What Tidings? SATB choir (text by John Audeley adapted by Jacqueline Froom)
- 1964 Op. 38/2 A Mediaeval Carol, medium voice and piano (text adapted by Jacqueline Froom)
- 1964 Op. 38/3 Four Welsh Songs, for unison voices and piano/ orchestra
- 1964 Op. 39 Dives & Lazarus, cantata, sop. bar vv orch
- 1964 Piano Sonatina
- 1965 Op. 40 Piano Sonata 3
- 1965 Op. 41 Concerto Grosso 1
- 1965 Op. 42 Aubade and Scherzo, horn and strings
- 1965 Op. 43 String Quartet 1
- 1966 Op. 44 Piano Concerto 3
- 1966 Op. 45 Overture 'Pantomime'
- 1966 Op. 46 Concerto Grosso 2, orch
- 1966 Op. 47 Variants, orch
- 1966 Op. 48 Night Music, orch
- 1966 Op. 49 Piano Sonata 4
- 1966 Severn Bridge Variation (1966, part of a composite work composed by Malcolm Arnold, Hoddinott, Nicholas Maw, Daniel Jones, Michael Tippett and Grace Williams)
- 1967 Op. 50 Clarinet Sonata
- 1967 Op. 51 Organ Concerto
- 1967 Op. 52 Suite for harp
- 1968 Op. 53 Noctures and Cadenzas, clarinet, violin and cello
- 1968 Op. 54 Roman Dream, voice and small ensemble
- 1968 Op. 55 An Apple Tree and a Pig
- 1968 Op. 56 Sinfonietta 1, orch
- 1968 Op. 57 Piano Sonata 5
- 1968 Op. 58 Divertimenti, fl cl bsn hn vln va vcl db
- 1968 Op. 59 Barti Ddu
- 1960 Op. 60 Fioriture (dedicated to Michael Tippett)
- 1968 Op. 61 Symphony 3
- 1968 Op. 62 Nocturnes & Cadenzas, vcl orch
- 1968 Op. 63 Violin Sonata 1
- 1969 Op. 64 Welsh Dances Suite 2, orch
- 1969 Op. 65/1 Horn Concerto
- 1969 Op. 65/2 Eryri, chorus and orch
- 1969 Op. 66 Investiture Dances, orch
- 1969 Op. 67 Sinfonietta 2, orch
- 1970 Op. 68 Fantasy for solo harp
- 1970 Op. 69 Divertimento for small orchestra
- 1970 Op. 70 Symphony 4
- 1970 Op. 71 Sinfonietta 3, orch
- 1970 Op. 72/1 Suite 1 for orchestra
- 1970 Op. 72/2 Concertino for horn, trumpet and orchestra
- 1971 Op. 72/3 Sinfonietta 4 for orchestra
- 1970 Op. 72/4 Aubade for small orchestra
- 1972 Op. 72/5 The Hawk Is Set Free for orchestra
- 1970 Op. 72/6 Floore of Heav'n for orchestra
- 1970 Op. 72/9 Concertino for Trumpet Horn & orchestra
- 1970 Op. 73/1 Violin Sonata 2
- 1970 Op. 73/2 Cello Sonata 1
- 1970 Op. 74 Motet: Out of the Deep
- 1970 Op. 76 The Sun the Great Luminary of the Universe, orch
- 1970 Op. 77 Piano Trio no. 1
- 1972 Op. 78/1 Violin Sonata 3
- 1972 Op. 78/2 Horn Sonata
- 1972 Op. 78/3 Piano Sonata 6
- 1972 Op. 78/4 Piano Quintet
- 1971 Op. 79 The Tree of Life, oratorio
- 1971 Op. 80 St. Paul at Malta, cantata
- 1973 Op. 81 Symphony 5
- 1974 Op. 82 Ancestor Worship
- 1974 Op. 83 The Beach of Falesa, 3-act opera
- 1974 Op. 84 The Silver Swimmer for SATB chorus and piano four hands
- 1974 Op. 85 Ritornelli for trombone wind & perc
- 1975 Op. 86/1 Landscapes, orchestra
- 1975 Op. 86/2 Nightpiece for orchestra
- 1975 Op. 87 5 Landscapes, Ynys Mon for ten & orch
- 1975 Op. 88 The Magician, 1-act opera
- 1976 Op. 89 Violin Sonata 4
- 1976 Op. 90 A Contemplation upon Flowers, sop. orch
- 1976 Op. 91 French Suite, small orch
- 1977 Op. 92 Italian Suite for recorder and guitar
- 1976 Op. 93 What the Old Man Does is Always Right, 1-act opera
- 1977 Op. 94 Passagio, orch
- 1977 Op. 95 Sinfonia Fidei, sop. ten vv orch
- 1977 Op. 96/1 Cello Sonata 2
- 1977 Op. 96/2 Organ Sonata
- 1978 Op. 97/1 Dulci Iuventutis SATB & piano four hands
- 1978 Op. 97/2 Hymnus ante somnum
- 1978 Sonatina for two pianos
- 1979 Hymnus ante somnum
- ? Op. 99 The Rajah's Diamond, opera
- 1979 Op. 100/1 Scena, for string quartet
- 1979 Op. 100/2 Ritornelli 2, brass
- 1980 Op. 101/a Nocturnes and Cadenzas, for solo cello
- 1980 Op. 101/b Nocturnes and Cadenzas, for solo flute
- 1980 Op. 102 The Heaventree of Stars, poem, vln and orch
- 1981 Op. 103 The Trumpet Major, 3-act Hardy opera
- 1981 Op. 104/2a Sonata for 4 clarinets
- 1981 Op. 104/2b Sonata for 4 saxophones
- 1981 Op. 105/1 Te Deum
- 1981 Op. 105/2 Lanterne des Morts, orch
- 1982 Op. 106 Doubles, Concertante for ob str hpschd
- 1982 Op. 107/1 Five Studies for orchestra
- 1982 Op. 107/2 Hommage a Chopin for orchestra
- 1982 Quodlibet on Welsh Nursery Tunes for orchestra
- 1982 Six Welsh Folksongs for high voice and piano
- 1982 The Charge of the Light Brigade
- 1983 King of Glory for SATB chorus and organ
- 1983 Make A Joyful Noise for SATB chorus and organ
- 1983 Op. 108 Ingraviscentem aetatem
- 1983 Op. 109 Masks for oboe bassoon and piano
- 1983 Op. 110 Lady and Unicorn
- 1983 Op. 111 Piano Trio 2
- 1983 Op. 112 Bagatelles for oboe and harp
- 1983 Quodlibet on Welsh Nursery Tunes for brass
- 1984 in parasceve Domini : 3 Nocturno
- 1984 Lady And Unicorn for SATB chorus and piano
- 1984 Op. 113 String Quartet 2
- 1984 Op. 114 Piano Sonata 7
- 1984 Op. 115 Scenes and Interludes, concertante for trumpet, harpsichord and strings
- 1984 Op. 116 Symphony 6
- 1984 Op. 117 The Bells of Paradise
- 1984 Op. 118 Divertimenti
- 1984 Op. 119 Scena for strings
- 1984 Op. 120 Sonata for 2 pianos
- 1985 Christ Is Risen
- 1985 Sing A New Song for SSAATB chorus and organ
- 1985 Op. 121 The Silver Hound for tenor and piano
- 1985 Op. 122 Prelude & Fugue, for organ
- 1985 Op. 123 Welsh Dances Suite 3
- 1985 Op. 124 Concerto for Piano Trio and Orchestra
- 1986 Op. 125 Piano Sonata 8
- 1986 Op. 126 Diversions
- 1986 Op. 127 Concerto for Orchestra
- 1986 Op. 128 Clarinet Concerto 2
- 1987 Op. 129 The Legend of St Julian, narrator, chorus and orch
- 1989 Op. 130 String Quartet 3
- 1989 Op. 131 Lines From Marlowe Doctor Faustus for SATB chorus brass percussion
- 1989 Op. 132 Noctis Equi, vcl orch
- 1989 Op. 133 Songs of Exile, ten & orchestra
- 1989 Op. 134 Piano Sonata 9
- 1989 Op. 135 Star Children, orch
- 1989 Op. 136 Piano Sonata 10
- 1989 Op. 137 Symphony 7, Organ Symphony
- 1989 Op. 138 Emynau Pantycelyn
- ? Op. 139 Novelette, for flute oboe and piano
- 1989 Op. 140 Flute Sonata
- 1989 Op. 141 Violin Sonata 5
- 1989 Op. 142 Symphony 8, for Brass & Percussion
- 2001 Op. 143/1 Paradwys Mai, baritone and piano
- 1992 Op.144 Chorales, Variants and Fanfares, for brass quintet
- 1990 Hymns of Pantycelyn, cantata
- 1992 Op.145 Symphony No.9 'Vision of Eternity' for soprano and orchestra
- 1993 Op. 146 Wind Quintet
- 1994 Sonata notturno
- 1995 Spectrum 1: Dark March, pno
- 1993 Op. 147 Piano Sonata 11
- 1993 Op. 148 Missa Sancti David
- 1993 Op. 149 Piano Sonata 12
- 1993 Op. 150 Six Bagatelles
- 1994 Op. 151/1 3 Hymns
- 1994 Op. 151/2 3 Shakespeare Songs
- 1994 Op. 152/1 The Silver Swimmer, soprano and ensemble
- 1994 Op. 152/2 Five Poems of Gustavo Adolfo Becquer translated from the Spanish by Ifan Payne
- 1994 Op. 153 Violin Concerto No.2
- 1995 Op. 154 Trumpet Concerto (The Shining Pyramid), written for Gareth Small and premiered at St David's Hall, Cardiff, on the last night of the Welsh Proms in 1995.
- 1995 Op. 155 Tymhorau for voice and piano or voice and strings (1996)
- 1995 Op. 156 Poetry on Earth
- 1995 Op. 157 Oboe and Harp Sonata
- 1996 Op. 158 Mass of Camargue for baritone, choir, piano duet, organ and percussion
- 1996 Op. 159 Cello Sonata 3
- 1997 Spectrum 2: Lizard, pno
- ? Op. 160 String Quartet 4
- ? Op. 161 Piano Trio 3
- 1996 Op. 162 Clarinet Sonata 2
- ? Op. 163 Violin Sonata 6
- 1997 Op. 164 Harp Sonata
- 1997 Op. 165 Poetry of Earth for voice and harp
- 1997 Op. 166/1 Island of Dreams, for solo cello
- 1997 Op. 166/2 Lizard, for solo treble recorder
- 1998 Op. 167 Dragon Fire
- 1998 Op. 168 Grongar Hill, a setting of sections from John Dyer's poem for baritone and piano quintet
- 1999 Op. 169 Celebration Dances for Orchestra
- 1999 Op. 170 Tower, final Op. era
- 1999 Op. 171 To the Poet, bass-baritone and piano
- 1999 Op. 172 Symphony 10
- 2000 Op. 173 La Serenissima for baritone and piano
- ? Op. 174 Doubles, quintet for oboe, piano and string trio
- ? Op. 175 Concerto for percussion and brass band
- ? Op. 176 Piano Sonata 13
- ? Op. 177 String Quartet 5
- ? Op. 178 Dream Wanderer
- ? Op. 179 Bagatelles, for 11 instruments
- 2002 Op. 180 Euphonium Concerto, The Sunne Rising, The King will Ride
- 2003 Op. 181 Lizard: Concerto for orchestra
- ? Op. 182 Euphonium Sonata
- 2004 Op. 183 The Promontory of Dreams for baritone, horn and strings
- 2004 Op. 184 Badger in the Bag
- 2004 Op. 185 Trombone Concerto written for Mark Eager World Premiere: Brecon with BBC National Orchestra of Wales Conductor Grant Llewellyn
- 2004 Op. 186 Bagatelles, for 4 trombones
- 2004 Op. 187 Concerto Grosso for brass band
- 2004 Op. 188 Sonata for piano duet
- 2005 Op. 189 La Serenissima: Images of Venice for soprano, baritone and orchestra
- 2006 Op. 190 Towy Landscape for soprano, baritone and piano (4 hands)
- 2007 Op. 192 Blake Songs, baritone and piano
- Bells of Paradise
- Divisions, Concertante for Horn Harpsichord & Strings
- Guitar Sonata
- In Praise of Music
- Music for String Quartet, premiered by Sacconi Quartet on 11 March 2008 at Wigmore Hall
- Prelude Nocturne And Dance for harp and strings
- Rhapsody
- On Welsh Tunes for orchestra
- Roman Dream for soprano percussion harp and celesta
- Scenes and Interludes, trumpet harpsichord and strings
- Te Deum
- Theatre Overture

== Bibliography ==
- Craggs, Stewart R. 1993. Alun Hoddinott: A Bio-Bibliography. Bio-Bibliographies in Music, no. 44. Westport, Conn.: Greenwood Press. ISBN 0-313-27321-9.
- Craggs, Stewart R. 2007. Alun Hoddinott: A Source Book. Aldershot, Hants, England; Burlington, VT: Ashgate. ISBN 978-0-7546-0895-0
- Deane, Basil. 1978. Alun Hoddinott. Composers of Wales 2. [Cardiff]: University of Wales Press [for] the Welsh Arts Council. ISBN 0-7083-0695-0.
- Michael Kennedy (Editor): The Oxford Dictionary of Music (Oxford University Press, Oxford, 1994) ISBN 0-19-869162-9
- Lewis, Geraint. 2001. "Hoddinott, Alun". The New Grove Dictionary of Music and Musicians, second edition, edited by Stanley Sadie and John Tyrrell. London: Macmillan Publishers.
- McGovern, Una. 2002. Chambers Biographical Dictionary, seventh edition. Edinburgh: Chambers. ISBN 0-550-10051-2
- Matthew-Walker, Robert. 1993. Alun Hoddinott on Record: A Composer and the Gramophone. St. Austell : D. G. R. Books. ISBN 1-898343-01-2
