= Mark Eager =

Mark Eager (born 17 March) is a London born conductor and former BBC National Orchestra of Wales Principal Trombone. He lives in Chelsea and Dorset, United Kingdom.

== Biography ==
Eager graduated from the Royal Academy of Music (1984), with Dip.RAM. He freelanced with the BBC Symphony Orchestra, English Chamber Orchestra, London Concert Orchestra, BBC Concert Orchestra, Bournemouth Symphony Orchestra, Ulster Orchestra, Royal Ballet Sinfonia and others until joining the BBC National Orchestra of Wales as Principal Trombone (1993–2006). He undertook much concerto work until 2006 when the Trombone Concerto 2004 (commissioned by the BBC) written for him by Alun Hoddinott caused serious muscle damage, ending his playing career.

In 1984 he was awarded the Silver Medal from the Worshipful Company of Musicians of London and in 1998 Awarded Orchestral Recognition Award by the International Trombone Association, along with BBC National Orchestra of Wales and Christian Lindberg. In 2004 he was made an Associate of the Royal Academy of Music (ARAM).

== BBC National Orchestra of Wales ==
During his years with BBC NOW, Eager performed and premiered several concerti for trombone and orchestra including:

- 1995 world premiere recording: 'Concerto for Trombone and Ten Winds' by Jean Francaix. Conducted by Adrian Leaper and broadcast on BBC Radio 3.
- 1997 'Trombone Concerto' by Michael Nyman. Conducted by Gregory Rose with the Lithuanian State Symphony Orchestra.
- 1998 BBC Commission for Eager: 'The Spindle of Necessity' by John Pickard. World Premiere St Davids Cathedral, Conducted by Martyn Brabbins and broadcast on BBC Radio 3.
- 1999 'Sonata for Trombone and Piano' by Paul Hindemith with Christopher Williams Piano. Recorded and broadcast on BBC Choice.
- 2001 'Fratres' by Arvo Pärt. Performed as part of the Swansea Festival of Music and the Arts. Conducted by Petri Sakari and broadcast on BBC Radio 3.
- 2002 'Fantasma Cantos II' Toru Takemitsu. Conducted by Tadaaki Otaka and broadcast on BBC Radio 3.
- 2004 BBC Commission for Eager 'Trombone Concerto' Alun Hoddinott. World Premiere Theatr Brycheiniog, Brecon. Conducted by Grant Llewellyn and broadcast on BBC Radio 3.

== Conducting career ==
In 2005 Eager was awarded a scholarship to the Orkney Conducting course with Martyn Brabbins, which brought him into a conducting career. He is currently:

- Principal Conductor and Artistic Director - The Welsh Sinfonia. Appointed 2006.
- Principal Conductor - Cardiff University Symphony Orchestra. Appointed 2008-2022.

== Royal Welsh College of Music and Drama ==
Eager is a conductor at the Royal Welsh College of Music and Drama. Appointed 1994.

== Trinity College London ==
Eager is an advisor, clinician and senior music examiner for Trinity College London and was appointed 2005.

== Magazine articles ==
2006 – Eager was the subject of a major feature in Classical Music Magazine.

2010 – The International Trombone Association produced a CD of four trombone concerti performed by Eager and the BBC National Orchestra of Wales including the world premieres of John Pickard 'The Spindle of Necessity' 1998, Alun Hoddinott 'Concerto' 2004 and the premier recording of Jean Françaix 'Concerto for Trombone and Ten Winds' 1995. Internationally distributed as a complimentary disc with the ITA magazine.
