= Madeleine Mitchell =

British violinist

Madeleine Mitchell FRSA
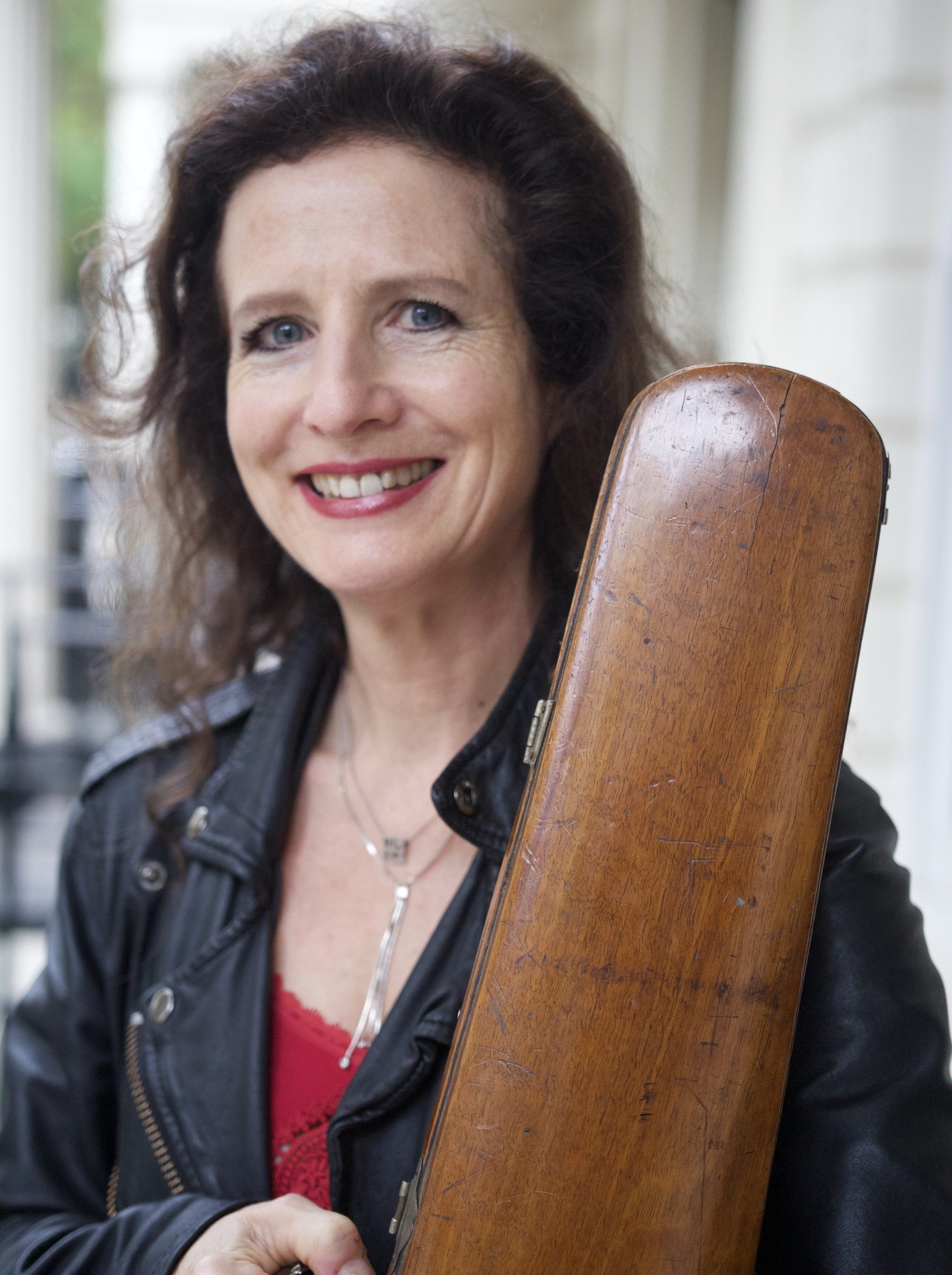

Background information
- Genre: Classical music
- Occupation: Musician
- Instrument: Violin
- Years active: 1984–present
- Labels: Divine Art, Naxos, NMC Records, Signum Records, Somm, Meridian, Linn
- Website: www.madeleinemitchell.com

Madeleine Louise Mitchell is a British violinist who has performed as a soloist and chamber musician in over forty countries. She has a wide repertoire and is particularly known for commissioning and premiering new works and for promoting British music in concert and on disc.

Mitchell is a professor at the Royal College of Music, Artistic Director of the Red Violin festival and Director of the London Chamber Ensemble She was also a member of The Fires of London and the Michael Nyman Band.

== Biography ==
=== Education ===
Mitchell was a Junior Exhibitioner at the Royal College of Music from the age of 12 to 18, studying violin with Bertha Stevens and piano with Aida Lovell. Mitchell's secondary education was at Hornchurch Grammar School.

As an Open Foundation Scholar at the Royal College of Music, Mitchell won the Tagore Gold Medal in 1978, graduating with First Class Honours, winning the 1st prize for GRSM and prizes for violin, chamber music and orchestral leadership, with repertoire lessons from Hugh Bean.

As Fulbright/ITT Fellow Mitchell gained a master's degree in New York at the Eastman and Juilliard schools studying with Sylvia Rosenberg, working as her graduate assistant, Donald Weilerstein and Dorothy DeLay. Mitchell was awarded a Fellowship to the Aspen Festival 1980–82. She recalls that DeLay was a "kind, perceptive and inspiring" teacher and that the "late night lessons in Aspen… were some of the best".

=== Performing career ===
Mitchell won the Worshipful Company of Musicians Maisie Lewis Young Artist Award in 1984, resulting in her debut at the Purcell Room at London's South Bank Centre, with further recitals there as Park Lane Group Young Artist 1985 and as winner of the Kirckman Concert Society recital award 1986, when she commissioned her first work, Fantasia by Brian Elias. Mitchell served from 1985 to 1987 as the violinist/violist member of Peter Maxwell Davies's performing group, The Fires of London. In 1992, she was a member of the Michael Nyman Band; she performed on the recording The Michael Nyman Songbook and appeared in Volker Schlöndorff's concert film.

Mitchell was one of the artists representing Britain in both the festival UKinNY with a recital at Lincoln Center and for the centenary of Entente Cordiale with France. She has given recitals at Sydney Opera House (17.3.89), Seoul Center for the Arts (13.4.89) and Hong Kong (18.4.89) as part of a three-month tour with the pianist Klaus Zoll under the auspices of the British Council and the Goethe Institute. Mitchell has played at many international and most of the major British festivals and frequently performs in London. She was leader of the Bridge String Quartet 2000–2007. She was invited by Norbert Brainin to perform with him for his 80th birthday concert at Wigmore Hall in 2003. Mitchell performed a solo recital at the Wigmore Hall in March 2015 accompanied by Nigel Clayton. Other artists with whom she has collaborated include Paul Watkins, Joanna MacGregor, Craig Ogden and Roger Chase. Her recitals have frequently been broadcast by BBC, S4C, ABC and Bayerischer Rundfunk.

Mitchell had considerable success with her 2007 album; "Violin Songs" a collection of short lyrical pieces performed with pianist Andrew Ball, which was named a Classic FM CD of the Week. The cover of Violin Songs features her Giuseppe Rocca violin made in 1839.

Mitchell has performed a wide repertoire of concertos with major orchestras including the St Petersburg Philharmonic (2009), Czech and Polish Radio Symphony, Wurttemberg and Munich Chamber, the Royal Philharmonic (Bruch Violin Concerto no.1 conducted by Sir Alexander Gibson in 1993 as part of the English Heritage Series), Welsh Chamber Orchestra, Orchestra de Bahia Brazil, Malaga Symphony of Spain and for the BBC. She performed with BBC National Orchestra of Wales in 2021 in Vaughan Williams The Lark Ascending and Grace Williams Violin Concerto, broadcast on BBC Radio 3.

Major festivals in which she has been invited include ISCM World Music Days Warsaw, Huddersfield Contemporary Music Festival, Articulacouns (Brazil), Vale of Glamorgan Festival (4 times), Canberra International Music Festival (Artist-in-Residence 2013) and the BBC Proms.

In 2022 Madeleine Mitchell won a Royal Philharmonic Society Enterprise Award to make a film combining Music and Art with the Victoria and Albert Museum exhibition Fabergé: Romance to Revolution and the concert programme of Anglo-Russian string quartets she curated with her London Chamber Ensemble and made a short film about the project.

Mitchell is the Director of the London Chamber Ensemble. She was made a Fellow of the Royal Society of Arts in 2000.

=== Teaching ===
Mitchell has been a professor at the Royal College of Music since 1994 and was a member of the RCM Council, elected by the professors 2013–16. Mitchell's students have won the Making Music prize and Park Lane Young Artists' Awards. Mitchell instigated Performance Seminars as the Graduate Pathway Leader for Solo/Ensemble students 2000–2011. She has frequently chaired examination panels, mentors students in the Centre for Performance Science and was invited to act as consultant for the major EU-funded TELMI project 2016–19.

=== Red Violin Festival ===
Mitchell is the Artistic Director of the Red Violin which has taken place in 1997 and 2007 in Cardiff. The eclectic international festival celebrates the fiddle across the arts, the title inspired by Le Violin Rouge paintings and covers "all things violin, including classical, fiddling, Indian and jazz use of the instrument" and was enthusiastically received by the media. Mitchell interviewed the Festival's Founder Patron, Lord Menuhin in 1997 for the BBC.

The October 2007 Red Violin festival included two world premieres performances by Mitchell with percussion group Ensemble Bash and the launch of her CD 'Violin Songs' featuring Elizabeth Watts. as well as showing of the Red Violin film.

Since 2019, a new board was formed with Nicholas Snowman OBE, Michael Beverley DL (chair) and Stephen Barter to plan another festival throughout Leeds in October 2024.

== Commissions and Premieres ==
Mitchell is noted for commissioning new music and premiering works in a range of styles, often written for her as gifts.

Mitchell recorded Michael Nyman's work 'On The Fiddle', written for her in 1993, and two works written for her by James MacMillan – Kiss on Wood (1994) and A Different World (1995) as part of her album In Sunlight: Pieces for Madeleine Mitchell NMC D098 of music written for her by Brian Elias, Stuart Jones, Stephen Montague, Nigel Osborne, Anthony Powers, and John Woolrich with pianist Andrew Ball in 2005.

Mitchell had a violin concerto written for her by Piers Hellawell – Quadruple Elegy in The Time of Freedom, which she premiered with the Ulster Orchestra and gave the London premiere at the Queen Elizabeth Hall in 1992 with the City of London Orchestra. She received an Arts Council England Award to commission and premiere a unique 'concerto' she devised for violin with voices by Jonathan Harvey, Thierry Pecou and Roxanna Panufnik. She received a further award for her 3-year collaboration 'FiddleSticks' with Ensemble Bash to commission and perform new works for solo violin and percussion by Anne Dudley, Tarik O'Regan and Stuart Jones as companion pieces to Lou Harrison Violin Concerto with Percussion Orchestra, which they performed without conductor, including Symphony Hall International Series and recorded.

Mitchell premiered the Violin Concerto written for her by Guto Pryderi Puw, 'Soft Stillness' in 2014 with Orchestra of the Swan and recorded the work live with the BBC National Orchestra of Wales in 2017, included on her album Violin Muse with works written for Mitchell by David Matthews, Sadie Harrison, Michael Nyman and Geoffrey Poole together with premiere recordings of works by Judith Weir and Michael Berkeley CBE. She premiered the Suite for violin and piano written for her by Robert Saxton at the Three Choirs Festival 2019. Also in 2019, Mitchell premiered 'Mist Waves' written for her as gift by Douglas Knehans in Cincinnati 2019. Mitchell commissioned a work by Errollyn Wallen, 'Sojourner Truth' for violin and piano, supported by the RVW Trust, which she premiered on International Women's Day 2021 in a livestream concert at St John's Smith Square, London in the programme curated by Mitchell with her London Chamber Ensemble: 'A Century of Music by UK Women' 1921–2021, featured on BBC Radio 4 Woman's Hour and BBC Radio 3 In Tune.

Following the sudden death of Nicholas Snowman OBE in 2023, Michael Berkeley CBE composed an unaccompanied solo violin piece for Madeleine Mitchell entitled 'Notes on the Loss of a Friend: In Memoriam Nicholas Snowman', which she premiered on BBC Radio 3.

== Discography ==
| Year | Album title | Works(Composer) | Label | Disc Reference |
|---|---|---|---|---|
| 1993 | Essential Michael Nyman (with the Michael Nyman Band) | Works by Michael Nyman | Decca | CD 0289 436 8202 2 zh Argo DDD |
| 2003 | British Treasures (with Andrew Ball) | Violin Sonata No. 1 (Sir Eugene Aynsley Goossens); Violin Sonata in D Major (William Hurlstone); Violin Sonata in E Minor (Percy Turnbull) | SOMM | SOMMCD031 |
| 2004 | Frank Bridge Quartet, Quintet | String quartet in Bb (previously unpublished); Viola Quintet; premiere recordings | Meridian | CDE 84525 |
| 2004 | Johann Nepomuk Hummel | Violin Sonatas | Meridian | CDE 84439 |
| 2004 | Quiet Music (with Joanna MacGregor) | Messiaen Louange a l'immortalité de Jésus (violin & piano) | SoundCircus | — |
| 2005 | In Sunlight: Pieces for Madeleine Mitchell (with Andrew Ball) | On the Fiddle (Michael Nyman); Kiss on Wood (James MacMillan); Fantasia (Brian Elias); Taw-Raw (Nigel Osborne); Folk Dances (Stephen Montague); ...that is night (John Woolrich); In Sunlight (Anthony Powers); A Different World (James MacMillan); Kothektche (Stuart Jones b.1949 UK) | NMC | NMC D098 |
| 2007 | Alwyn: Chamber Music and Songs (with: Roger Chase; Andrew Ball; Lucy Wilding / Bridge String Quartet; Jeremy Huw WiIliams; Iain Burnside) | Rhapsody for Piano Quartet; Sonata Impromptu for Violin and Viola; Two Songs for Voice, Violin and Piano; Sonatina for Violin and Piano; Three Winter Poems for String Quartet; (all by William Alwyn) | Naxos | 8.570340 |
| 2007 | FiddleSticks (with ensemble bash) | Concerto for the Violin with Percussion Orchestra (Lou Harrison); Vermilion Rhapsody (Anne Dudley); Fragments from a Gradual Process (Tarik O'Regan); Gharnati (Stuart Jones); Mopti Street (Simon Limbrick); Kumpo (Trad Senegalese arr ensemble bash) | Signum Classics | SIGCD111 |
| 2007 | Violin Songs (with Andrew Ball and Elizabeth Watts) | Salut d'Amour (Elgar, Edward); Die Nachtigall (Alban Berg (arr. Madeleine Mitchell); Mélodie (version for violin and piano) (Frank Bridge); Nocturne (Aaron Copland); Cinq Mélodies Op. 35b (Sergey Prokofiev); Morceau Caractéristique (Frank Bridge); Thais Act II: Meditation (Jules Massenet (arr. M.P. Marsick); Chanson de Nuit and Chanson de Matin Op. 15 (Elgar, Edward); Amaryllis and Romanze (Frank Bridge); Nocturne (version for violin and piano) (Lili Boulanger); Spring Song (version for violin and piano) (Frank Bridge); Violon (Francis Poulenc (arr. Madeleine Mitchell)); Berceuse sur le nom de Fauré (Maurice Ravel); Ellen's Gesang III (Ave Maria) (Franz Schubert (arr. J. Palaschko)); Moto perpetuo (Frank Bridge); Berceuse (version for violin and piano) (Frank Bridge); Morgen (Richard Strauss) | Divine Art | dda25063 |
| 2008 | Howard Blake: Music for Piano and Strings (with Howard Blake, piano) | Violin Sonata Op. 586; Penillion for violin and piano Op. 571; Jazz Dances for violin and piano Op. 520a; (all by Howard Blake) | Naxos | 8.572083 |
| 2010 | Messiaen (with: Joanna MacGregor; David Campbell; Christopher van Kampen; Charlotte Riedijk) | Quatuor pour la fin du temps (Olivier Messiaen); Quatuor pour la naissance (Zygmunt Krauze); Gramophone Magazine recommended recording. | SoundCircus / Warner Classics & Jazz | 2564 68393-2 (re-issue of 1994 Collins Classics) |
| 2011 | The Chamber Music of Wendy Hiscocks (with: Wendy Hiscocks, piano; Rachel Nicholls, soprano; Sarah Thurlow, clarinet; Brian Mullan, cello; Philippa Mo, violin; Michael Turner, viola) | Shades of the Alhambra; Mother & Child; Nocturne; Coral Fantasy; Libretto of the Eight Year Old; (all by Wendy Hiscocks) | Symposium | SYMPCD1389 |
| 2012 | Associated Board Royal Schools of Music Violin Syllabus 2012–15 | Items on the demonstration CDs accompanying the volumes of exam pieces. | ABRSM | |
| 2013 | Alpha and Omega (with Cappella Nova) | Domine non-secundum peccata nostra (James MacMillan) BBC Music Magazine Choral CD of the Month March 2014 | Linn Records | CKD439 |
| 2017 | The Silver Hound and other songs by Betty Roe (with Sarah Leonard, soprano and Nigel Foster, piano) | In this Lone, Open Glade (Betty Roe); The Critic (Betty Roe) | metier | MSV 28566 |
| 2017 | Violin Muse (with BBC National Orchestra of Wales conducted by Edwin Outwater, Nigel Clayton, piano and Cerys Jones, violin) | Rhapsody (Geoffrey Poole); Violin Concerto (Guto Pryderi Puw); Romanza (David Matthews); Aurea Luce (Sadie Harrison); Atlantic Drift Violin Duos (Judith Weir); Veilleuse (Michael BerkeleyCBE); Taking it as Read (Michael Nyman) | Divine Art | dda25160 |
| 2019 | Grace Williams Chamber Music (London Chamber Ensemble, directed by Madeleine Mitchell) | Violin Sonata (1930); Sextet for Oboe, Trumpet, Violin, Viola, Violoncello and Pianoforte (1931); Suite for Nine Instruments (1934); Romanza for Oboe and Clarinet (1940s); Sarabande for Piano Left Hand (1958); Rondo for Dancing for Two Violins and Optional 'Cello; (all by Grace Williams) Guardian CD of the Week | Naxos | 8.571380 |
| 2023 | Violin Conversations (music for solo violin, violin and piano and violin and tape) | Violin Sonata (Alan Rawsthorne, 1958) – with Andrew Ball, live BBC recording from the Millennium Series; Dybbuk Melody (Joseph Horovitz, 1980) – solo violin, premiere recording; Sojourner Truth (Errollyn Wallen, commissioned by MM 2021 with RVW Trust) – premiere recording, with EW piano; Caprice (Wendy Hiscocks, 1990) – solo violin, premiere recording; Dry White Fire (Wendy Hiscocks, 2010) – violin/piano, premiere recording with WH piano; Mist Waves (Douglas Knehans, for MM 2019) – with Nigel Clayton piano, premiere recording in original version; Colloquy (Thea Musgrave, 1960) – violin/piano with Ian Pace piano, premiere recording; Barcarolles (Martin Butler, for MM 2021) – violin/piano with MB piano, premiere recording; Worlds Apart (Richard Blackford, for MM & Nicholas Snowman 2020) – solo violin; Your Call is Important to Us (Kevin Malone, for MM 2022) – solo violin & electronics, premiere recording; The Ice Princess & The Snowman (Howard Blake, arranged for MM 2018) – with HB piano, premiere recording | Naxos | 8.574560 |
