= Christopher Painter =

British composer

Christopher Painter is a composer who was born at Port Talbot, South Wales in 1962 and studied music at University College, Cardiff. His composition studies were initially with Timothy Taylor and Richard Elfyn Jones and in 1984 he began to study with Alun Hoddinott.

== Studies ==
He studied full-time with Hoddinott until 1989 and complemented these studies with consultations and masterclasses with Samuel Adler (Eastman School of Music, New York); George Benjamin; John McCabe (London College of Music); Edward Gregson (Royal Northern College of Music); Robert Saxton (Worcester College, Oxford); Robert Simpson and Marek Stachowski (Warsaw University). In addition to his composition studies, Christopher also studied brass band conducting with Edward Gregson; choral conducting with Stanley Saunders (University of Guelph, Canada) and Rod Walker (University of Texas, USA) and latterly, orchestral conducting with Christopher Adey.

== Awards ==
Christopher Painter was the first recipient of the Afan Thomas Composer's Award and has also won the National Eisteddfod Composition Prize (Newport 1988) and was featured in the Welsh Arts Council's Young Welsh Composer Forum in 1987. In 1997, he was the first Welsh winner of the Gregynog Composer Award of Wales which was given for his Sonata for Harp which was premièred on 28 June at the 1997 Gregynog Festival.

== Career ==
Appointed as Composer-in-Association with North Wales-based Ensemble Cymru in October 1997, Painter wrote a number of works for this ensemble, including the children's dance work, Yggdrasil, a Millennium Commission/Techniquest commission as part of the Sounds for Science education project.

In 1999 Christopher Painter was Composer-in-Residence with both the National Youth Orchestra of Wales and National Youth Brass Band of Wales. His work, Invisible Cities, for the National Youth Orchestra of Wales, not only received performances around the UK but was also subsequently released on CD by the orchestra.

In 2001 Painter began to teach in the composition department at the Royal Welsh College of Music & Drama where he has specialised in teaching counterpoint, harmony, music typesetting and orchestration to postgraduate composition students.

The Royal Society of Arts awarded Christopher Painter a Fellowship in December 2003.

In August 2005, Christopher Painter won the prestigious Tlws y Cerddor (Musicians Medal) at the National Eisteddfod of Wales for his chamber work, Yr Hanes Swynol (A History of Charms). He won the award for a second time in 2010 for Syniadau’r Serch (Thoughts on Love), a cycle of songs for baritone, violin and harp.

Between Autumn 2005 and Spring 2006 Painter was Composer-in-Residence with the Thueringen Philharmonie in Gotha, Germany. Here he worked closely with Welsh conductor Alun Francis, a long-time champion of his music, and his tenure ended with the première of a major work for the orchestra, Forest of Dreams, which received two performances and was broadcast on German television. The work subsequently received its UK première with the BBC National Orchestra of Wales, under the direction of Jac van Steen, in April 2009.

In 2010, the Lunar Saxophone Quartet premièred his Lunar Seas on their These Visions tour and the work was released on Signum Classics. This followed an earlier recording, also on Signum, of his Sonata for Alto Saxophone, commissioned by Welsh saxophonist, Lara James.

In 2006, his Symphony No.3 - Fire in the Snow received its première in Mexico City where it was twice performed by the Orchestra Filharmonico de la UNAM under the direction of Alun Francis. The second performance was broadcast live on Mexican national television to an estimated audience in excess of one million people.

In March 2011, Furnace of Colours was premièred by the BBC National Orchestra of Wales and soprano Claire Booth, conducted by Jac van Steen, and broadcast on BBC Radio 3.

More recent works include Hanes Taliesin (Taliesin’s Tale) for solo clarinet and dancer; Images in the Mist for the Richards String Quartet and The Gregynog Suite for solo harp, commissioned by the Gregynog Festival and premièred by Catrin Finch.

Christopher Painter's works are published by Arcomis Publishing; Maecenas Music; Oriana Publications and Vanderbeek & Imrie
