= Jeffrey Lewis (composer) =

British composer

Jeffrey Lewis (28 November 1942 - 30 November 2025) was a Welsh composer.

== Biography and work ==
Lewis was born in Neath, where he joined the church choir and began learning the organ, and now lives in Llanfairfechan. He studied at the University of Wales, Cardiff, under Alun Hoddinott; with György Ligeti and Karlheinz Stockhausen at Darmstadt; with Bogusław Schaeffer in Kraków and with Don Banks in London. He taught at Leeds College of Music (1969–1972) and the University of Wales, Bangor (1973–1992), under William Mathias.

Early performances included Fanfares with Variations and the Chamber Concerto with the BBC Welsh Orchestra under John Carewe, and, at the 1967 Cheltenham Festival, his Two Cadenzas for piano and Epitaphium - Children of the Sun for narrator, chamber choir, piano, flute, clarinet and percussion. BBC commissions included the orchestral works Mutations I (1969), Aurora (1973), Scenario (1975), Praeludium (1975), Memoria (1978) and Limina Lucis (1982). Other works include a Piano Concerto (1989), Duologue for violin and piano (1971), Scena for violin and piano (1988), Teneritas for flute and piano (1997), Sonante for clarinet and piano (1986 - for Thea King), Cantus for clarinet and piano (1996), a Piano Trio (1983), a Wind Quintet (1986), several mixed ensemble pieces including Time-Passage (1977), Stratos (1979), Epitaph for Abelard and Heloise (1979) and Litania (1993), piano works including Tableau (1980), Fantasy (1983), Threnody (1990 - all for Jana Frenklova), Trilogy (1992), Musica Aeterna (1997) and Sereno (2004), organ works including Mutations II (1971), Momentum (1977) and Esultante (1977 - these last two for Gillian Weir), Dreams, Dances and Lullabies for harp (1990), Silentia Noctis for high voice and piano (1989), and many choral works, notably Carmen Paschale (1981), Hymnus Ante Somnum (1985), Sequentia ad Sancte Michaele (1985), Westminster Mass (1990 - for Martin Neary), Recordatio (1999) and a sequence of eleven Sacred Chants (2005).

Lewis's music is characterised by rhythmic energy and harmonic complexity alternating with extreme stillness; latterly his music has tended towards greater simplicity and tranquility and it often appears to inhabit a twilight world of dreams. However, he has achieved this simplicity through a process of constant refinement of his compositional technique, rather than any rejection of his earlier complexity.

In 2005 Ivan March in Gramophone magazine described the CD release of Epitaph for Abelard and Heloise, Litania and Musica Aeterna as "...a disc not to be missed by anyone who cares about communicative 20th-century music."

Following Lewis's death on 30 November 2025, the Welsh Music Centre Tŷ Cerdd posted a memorial tribute by David Jones and Richard Lewis which included an embed of Jones's 2013 interview with the composer.

== Sources ==
- Henshall, Dalwyn: “Memento Mori - An appreciation of Jeffrey Lewis’s recent orchestral music.” (Welsh Music, Vol 6 No 6, 1980 & Vol 6 No 7, 1981)
- Jones, David: Notes for CD ASC CS CD43 – Jeffrey Lewis: Threnody, Cantus, Teneritas, Sonante, Trilogy
- Jones, David: Notes for CD CAMEO 2037 – Jeffrey Lewis: Epitaph for Abelard and Heloise, Litania, Musica Aeterna
- Jones, David: “A glimpse of infinity: time and stillness in the music of Jeffrey Lewis” (The Musical Times Vol.145 No.1889 (Winter 2004), pp. 65–74)
- Tommis, Colin: “Y Gitar Gymreig – Jeffrey Lewis” (Guitar International, July 1989, pp 22 –27)
