= John Pickard (composer) =

British classical composer (born 1963)

John Pickard (born 11 September 1963) is a British classical composer.

== Biography ==
Pickard was born in Burnley, Lancashire, England. He studied music and composition at the University of Wales, with Welsh composer William Mathias, and later in the Netherlands with Louis Andriessen and in 1989 was awarded a PhD in composition from the University of Wales. Since 1993 he has taught at the University of Bristol, where he is Professor of Composition and Applied Musicology, and was Head of Music between 2009 and 2013, and again between 2017 and 2018. Pickard is also conductor of the University of Bristol Symphony Orchestra and Choral Society.

Pickard has composed a number of critically well-received orchestral and instrumental works, among them six symphonies and a number of symphonic works, including perhaps his best-known piece, The Flight of Icarus, which the San Francisco Chronicle called "a translucent and achingly lovely memorial to the fallen Icarus ... a serious contender for the most exciting musical premiere of 2006". His orchestral writing has been highly praised: in March 2008 The Times commented that "his orchestral mastery is total", while, in April 2008 The Guardian described his music as "at its best virtuosically effective, in a style that never seems either self-consciously conservative or too stubbornly middle-of-the-road". He has also composed a piano concerto, a trombone concerto titled The Spindle of Necessity, and six string quartets. The Strad stated that the fourth quartet was "one of the best pieces of British chamber music to be heard for years", while Tempo, reviewing a recording of his quartets nos. 2, 3 and 4, offered the opinion that "if Pickard were never to write another quartet in his life, his place among the greats is secure".

Between 2005 and 2016 Pickard was also the General Editor of the Elgar Complete Edition.

== Selected works ==
=== Orchestral ===
- Symphony No. 1 (1983–84)
- Symphony No. 2 (1985–87)
- Sea-Change (1989)
- The Flight of Icarus (1990)
- Channel Firing (1992–93)
- Symphony No. 3 (1997)
- Tenebrae (2008)
- Sixteen Sunrises (2013)
- Symphony No. 5 (2014)
- The Art of Beginning (2018)
- Symphony No. 6 (2021)

=== Brass band ===
- Gaia Symphony [Symphony No. 4] (1991–2003)
- Eden (2005)
- Rain, Steam and Speed (2017)

=== Concertante ===
- The Spindle of Necessity, Trombone Concerto (1997–98); commissioned for and premiered by Mark Eager and BBC NOW
- Piano Concerto (1999-2000)

=== Chamber and instrumental music ===
- String Quartet No. 1 (1991)
- String Quartet No. 2 (1993)
- String Quartet No. 3 (1994)
- Chaconne for viola solo (1998)
- String Quartet No. 4 (1998)
- Sonata for violin and piano (2004)
- String Quartet No. 5 (2012)
- The Gardener of Aleppo for flute, viola and harp (2016)
- Ghost-Train for ensemble (2016)
- String Quartet No.6 (2019)
- Piano Sonata No.2 (2020)

=== Piano ===
- Piano Sonata (1987)
- A Starlit Dome, Astronomical Nocturne (1995)

=== Vocal ===
- The Phoenix for soprano and piano (1992)
- The Borders of Sleep, Song Cycle for baritone and piano (2001)
- Agamemnon's Tomb for three vocal soloists, chorus and orchestra (2007–8)
- Binyon Songs for baritone and piano or orchestra (2010–12)
- Mass in Troubled Times for 18 unaccompanied voices (2018)
- Verlaine Songs for soprano and ensemble (2020)

== Nominations and awards ==
- 2006 – Eden nominated in the Wind Band or Brass Band category of the British Composer Awards
- 2013 – Tenebrae nominated in the Orchestral category of the British Composer Awards
- 2016 – In Sea-Cold Lyonesse nominated in the Amateur or Young Performers category of the Ivors Composer Awards
- 2019 – Mass in Troubled Times nominated in the Choral category of the Ivors Composer Awards
- 2021 – The Gardener of Aleppo and other Chamber Works winner of the Contemporary category of the Gramophone Classical Music Awards
