= Jeremy Huw Williams =

Welsh baritone opera singer

Jeremy Huw Williams BEM (born 3 April 1969) is a Welsh baritone opera singer, known for his work in contemporary classical music.

== Early life and education ==
Williams was born in Cardiff. He studied at Ysgol Gyfun Gymraeg Glantaf, Cardiff, St John's College, Cambridge, at the National Opera Studio, London, and with April Cantelo.

== Career ==
Williams has appeared for Welsh National Opera, Opera Ireland and Music Theatre Wales amongst others, and has released numerous recordings, most notably of music by contemporary Welsh composers, including Alun Hoddinott, William Mathias and Mansel Thomas. In addition to these he has also given premieres of works by composers John Tavener, Martin Butler, John Metcalf, Julian Phillips, Edward Dudley Hughes, Ian Wilson, Richard Causton, Edward Rushton, Arlene Sierra and Huw Watkins. In 2019 he became President of the Incorporated Society of Musicians (ISM).

== Recordings ==
Williams has an extensive discography, including recordings of songs by William Mathias, Alun Hoddinott, and Mansel Thomas.

== Personal life ==
In 1991, Williams married Manon Jenkins, now Manon Antoniazzi. The marriage ended in divorce.

== Honours ==
Williams was awarded the British Empire Medal (BEM) in the 2021 Birthday Honours for services to music. He has also been awarded an Honorary Fellowship by Glyndŵr University in 2009 for services to music in Wales, the Honorary Degree of Doctor of Music from the University of Aberdeen in 2011, and also the 2022 John Edwards Memorial Award, the most prestigious non-competitive award given in Wales for services to the nation’s music.
