= Grant Llewellyn =

Welsh conductor and music director

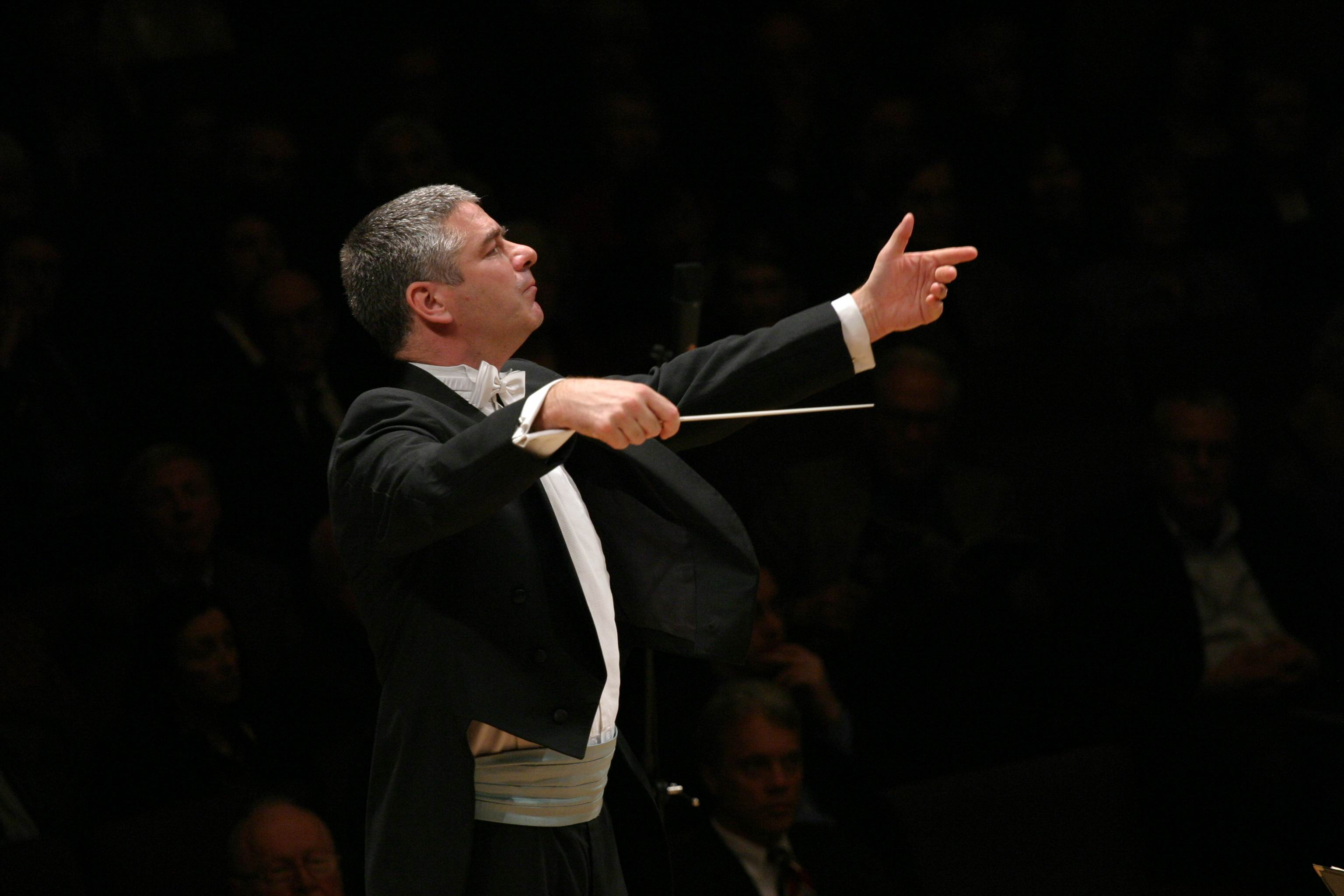
Grant Llewellyn in 2003

Grant Llewellyn (born 29 December 1960) is a Welsh conductor and music director of the Orchestre National de Bretagne.

== Biography ==
Llewellyn was born in Tenby, Pembrokeshire, Wales. He began developing his conducting reputation in 1985, when he was awarded a conducting fellow position at the Tanglewood Music Center in Massachusetts. There his mentors included Leonard Bernstein, Seiji Ozawa, Kurt Masur and André Previn. He later conducted concerts at the Tanglewood Festival with the Boston Pops and as assistant conductor of the Boston Symphony Orchestra. In 1986, Llewellyn won the second Leeds Conducting Competition.

From 1990 to 1995, he was associate conductor of the BBC National Orchestra of Wales. He was principal guest conductor of the Stavanger Symfoniorkester from 1993 to 1996. Llewellyn served as chief conductor of the Royal Philharmonic Orchestra of Flanders (now known as the Antwerp Symphony Orchestra) from 1995 to 1998.

From 2001 to 2006, Llewellyn was the music director of the Handel and Haydn Society (Boston), where he also held the title of principal conductor. He served as music director of the North Carolina Symphony from 2004 until 2018. He has been music director of the Orchestre Symphonique de Bretagne since 2014.

In opera, LLewellyn has conducted the Chelsea Opera Group in Nelson by Lennox Berkeley in 1988, then four Verdi operas: Nabucco, La battaglia di Legnano, Luisa Miller, and in 2025 Macbeth in the Group's 75th anniversary concert. He has led performances at the English National Opera (Die Zauberflöte) and the Opera Theatre of Saint Louis. He developed an association with stage director Chen-Shi Zheng with a 2001 production of Henry Purcell's Dido and Aeneas at the Spoleto Festival USA. He also conducted a 2003 new production of Jules Massenet’s Manon at Opera North. More recently he conducted at the BBC Cardiff Singer of the World competition.

Grant Llewellyn is UK president of the Welsh Sinfonia, Wales' professional chamber orchestra, conducted by Mark Eager.

Llewellyn, his wife Charlotte and their four children reside in Cardiff.

Llewellyn suffered a stroke in 2021 and now has to conduct with his left hand.

== Sources ==
- Waleson, Heidi (Winter 2001). "Handel & Haydn maps out a new era". Early Music America (7): 18–21.
- Loveland, K. (Autumn 1995). "Grant Llewellyn". Musical Opinion (118): 145.
- "Honours and Appointments". The Instrumentalist. 45: 6. August 1990.

Cultural offices
Preceded by Muhai Tang	Chief Conductor, DeFilharmonie; 1995–1998	Succeeded by Philippe Herreweghe
Preceded by Christopher Hogwood	Music Director, Handel and Haydn Society; 2001–2006	Succeeded by Roger Norrington (Artistic Advisor)
Preceded by Gerhardt Zimmermann	Music Director, North Carolina Symphony; 2004–2018	Succeeded by Carlos Miguel Prieto
