= Music Theatre Wales =

Music Theatre Wales (MTW) is a touring contemporary opera company, based in Cardiff, Wales. MTW performs newly commissioned works, alongside existing pieces from the recent past which are either neglected or have been unseen in the UK. Works are toured across the UK and internationally. Over its 22-year history MTW has performed almost 30 productions and 14 world premieres.

In 2002 it became the first Associate Company of the Royal Opera House.

== History ==
Founded in 1988 by Artistic Directors Michael McCarthy and Michael Rafferty, Music Theatre Wales was created from the merger of two previous companies - both formed in south Wales in 1982 - Cardiff New Opera Group and St Donats Music Theatre Ensemble.

At that time both organisations had identified a gap in the provision of opera in Wales. Though Welsh National Opera had achieved great success in exploring lesser known areas of the repertoire and had established itself as the leading, innovative opera company of the UK, there was very little commitment to new work. Audience and critical response to the work of Cardiff New Opera Group in particular demonstrated that there was indeed a hunger for new opera and a demand to see it tour in Wales.

Initially the repertoire was selected from works that already existed but which deserved wider exposure. Fundamentally, the repertoire was inspired by the work of Peter Maxwell Davies and his own company, The Fires of London. The first MTW production was a setting of Peter Maxwell Davies’ The Martyrdom of St Magnus in the graveyard of the Saxon church in the grounds of St Donat's Castle. The production was then adapted for touring in Wales and later re-worked into a production for Glasgow European City of Culture 1990, playing at the Tramway, and at the Queen Elizabeth Hall, London in collaboration with the Scottish Chamber Orchestra. This was followed by the European premiere of Philip Glass's The Fall of the House of Usher which toured in Wales and England, establishing en route many long-term relationships with venues and festivals, and led to the company's first international collaboration when it was presented in Norway as the first production of Opera Vest (recently re-formed as Den Nye Opera–Norway's second main-scale opera company presenting a mixed programme of new and established repertoire).

Since 1988 MTW has created almost 30 productions and presented 14 world premieres. It has an established programme to help nurture new opera composers and has created productions with a wide range of partners including Opéra national du Rhin in Strasbourg, the Berlin Festival, Opera Vest in Norway, Banff Centre in Canada, Theatr Brycheiniog in Brecon, Haarlem Theatre in the Netherlands, Treffpunkt in Stuttgart, and the Royal Opera House, Covent Garden. MTW has been recorded on CD, broadcast on BBC radio, and one production has been re-created and screened on BBC2. The company has twice been short-listed for the Prudential Awards for “creativity, excellence, innovation and accessibility.” The opera Gwyneth and the Green Knight by Lynne Plowman, produced by MTW in 2002 and later as a co-production with ROH2 was the first opera to win the British Composers Award and Lynne Plowman's second opera commissioned by MTW, The House of the Gods, was also shortlisted for this award in 2007. In 2009, the company worked for the first time in Welsh, commissioning a new performing version of The Soldier's Tale–Stori’r Milwr. 2010 sees the Signum Records release of a CD of Michael Berkeley’s opera For You and the UK premiere tour of In the Penal Colony by Philip Glass. In 2013 MTW gave the UK premiere of Salvatore Sciarrino's Luci mie traditrici, in an English translation with the title 'The Killing Flower'.

In Autumn 2017 the company's touring production of The Golden Dragon by the Hungarian composer Péter Eötvös was acclaimed by reviewers, but ran into trouble from "yellowface" activists, who threatened to picket performances: this resulted in the production being banned from the stage of the Hackney Empire, and subsequent public apologies from MTW's management.

== Repertoire history since 1988 ==
- The Golden Dragon Peter Eötvös
- In the Penal Colony Philip Glass
- Letters of a Love Betrayed Eleanor Alberga and Donald Sturrock (commission 2009)
- Crime Fiction Huw Watkins and David Harsent (commission 2009)
- Stori’r Milwr (new Welsh version of The Soldier's Tale, commissioned 2009)
- For You Michael Berkeley and Ian McEwan (commission 2008)
- Julie Philippe Boesmans and Luc Bondy (based on Strindberg)
- House of the Gods Lynne Plowman and Martin Riley (commission 2006)
- The Knot Garden Michael Tippett
- The Piano Tuner Nigel Osborne and Amanda Holden (commission 2004)
- Ion Param Vir and David Lan (commission 2003)
- The Electrification of the Soviet Union Nigel Osborne and Craig Raine (new version commissioned 2002)
- Gwyneth and the Green Knight Lynne Plowman and Martin Riley (commission 2002)
- Jane Eyre Michael Berkeley and David Malouf (commission 2000)
- The Rape of Lucretia Benjamin Britten and Ronald Duncan
- Punch and Judy Harrison Birtwistle and Stephen Pruslin
- The Roswell Incident John Hardy and Heledd Wyn (commission 1997)
- In the House of Crossed Desires John Woolrich and Marina Warner (commission 1996)
- The Soldier's Tale Igor Stravinsky (new performing version commissioned from Sion Eirian 1995)
- Pierrot Lunaire Arnold Schoenberg
- Flowers John Hardy and Ed Thomas (commission 1994)
- The Lighthouse Peter Maxwell Davies
- The Man Who Mistook His Wife for a Hat Michael Nyman and Christopher Rawlence
- 8 Songs for a Mad King Peter Maxwell Davies
- The Four Note Opera Tom Johnson
- Ubu Andrew Toovey and Michael Finnissy (commission 1992)
- The Fall of the House of Usher Philip Glass and Arthur Yorinks
- The Martyrdom of St Magnus Peter Maxwell Davies
