= Anthony Powers =

British composer of classical music (born 1953)

- Born: 1953 (age 72–73); London, England
- Genres: Classical
- Occupation: composer
- Years active: 1976–present
- Website: OUP Biography

Anthony Powers (born 13 March 1953) is a British composer of classical music. He has received a number of commissions, including the BBC and the Three Choirs Festival Society and a number of individuals, while his works have been performed both in Great Britain and abroad. He was shortlisted for a British Composer Award in 2003.

== Life ==
Born in London, England, Powers took private tuition from Elisabeth Lutyens and Harrison Birtwistle between 1969 and 1971, and also with Nadia Boulanger in Paris from 1972 to 1973. From 1973 to 1976 he studied at the University of York for a DPhil in Composition under David Blake and Bernard Rands. Following the completion of his studies, Powers taught at Dartington College of Arts for two years and was composer-in-residence at Southern Arts. In 1987 he moved to a position at Cardiff University, where he became composer-in-residence in 1990 and Professor of Composition from 2004 until 2010. He was Chairman of the Association of Professional Composers between 1995 and 1997.

Powers has written over sixty works, including four string quartets, two symphonies, a cello concerto, a horn concerto, as well as many choral and chamber works. He has also done settings of texts by Wordsworth, Lawrence Durrell, Shelley, Baudelaire and Philip Larkin.

== Summary of key works ==
=== Orchestral ===
Stone, Water, Stars (1987), commissioned for the BBC Symphony Orchestra, is the third part of a trilogy inspired by the ambiance and architecture of Venice. The other two works that belong to this trilogy are the Chamber Concerto (1983/4) and Venexiana (1985), which Powers both references in this piece, thus linking them thematically.

The Concerto for Cello (1990) was commissioned for the King's Lynn Festival, specifically written for the cellist Stephen Isserlis and dedicated to the artistic adviser of the festival, Meirion Bowen. The concerto is in three movements with a prominent piano piece in the opening passage of the work. Although some of the writing for the soloist and orchestra is at times quite turbulent, a number of critics have commented on the "reflective" nature of the piece.

The Concerto for Horn (1989) was written for the horn player Michael Thompson and included two movements; 'Madrigals of Love and War' and 'Winter Journeys'. The theme was similar to his previous work, and was described by John Warnaby as, 'an element of conflict [that] is gradually superseded by affirmative lyricism'. It was influenced by Powers' visits to Czechoslovakia in 1986 and 1988 Powers explains that; 'The concerto seemed to be, on one level at least, a history, in music, of Czechoslovakia from 1968 to 1989'.

Anthony Powers' Symphony was written between 1994 and 1996, although he did not necessarily set out to write one. As it was appearing to become a full orchestral work, Powers received assistance from the David James Music Trust to complete it. It was dedicated to his parents while Andrew Burn noted how it demonstrated 'mastery of extended large-scale structures', and Nicholas Jones commented on the 'evident assuredness of Powers's handling of the symphonic genre'. Between 1998 and 1999 the composer completed his Symphony No. 2 which was first performed by the BBC Symphony Orchestra in 2002.

=== Vocal/Choral ===
A Picture of the World (2001) was commissioned by the BBC and is a setting of Ludwig Wittgenstein's Tractatus Logico-Philosophicus, following in the footsteps of his mentor Elisabeth Lutyens. Powers explained the use of a counter-tenor as 'Wittgenstein had an unusually high speaking voice' with the vocal and clarinet acting as the voice of the philosopher. The piece was premiered at Warsaw Autumn Festival and broadcast on Radio 3, while in the Guardian, Harry Eyres commented on the unusual instrumentation of the piece.

Airs and Angels (2003) was commissioned for the Three Choirs Festival held in Hereford in 2003 and was an interpretation of seven of John Donne's (1572–1631) poems. At the work's centre lies the 'dark and intense' setting of 'A Nocturnal Upon St. Lucy's Day', while the Guardian described the work as a'striking setting of [the] love poems by John Donne, conceived in seven sections that merge imperceptibly into a continuous arching sequence'.

From Station Island (2003) is an abridged interpretation of a poetry collection of the same name by Seamus Heaney, where the composer reworked and edited nine poems into a narrative that included a male speaker, baritone and a small ensemble where the former has the role of the poet and the baritone acts out numerous characters. At the West Cork Music Festival in Ireland in June 2005, the work received its Irish premiere and the male speaker role was performed by Seamus Heaney himself.

Others include Lullaby (1991), Lullo by Lollo (1993) and O Magnum Mysterium (1995).

=== Chamber music ===
Another Part of the Island (1980, revised in 1994) is a chamber work in four movements that as premiered at the Queen Elizabeth Hall, London in May 1982 and conducted by John Carewe. The piece refers to the imaginary island from Shakespeare's The Tempest, where the instruments can be seen as playing characters from the play.

His chamber works include a number of solo works, for example:

- Nocturnes: book 2 (1984) – cello
- Barcarola (1987) – viola
- In Two Minds (1991) – oboe
- Nature Studies (1992) – guitar

Other chamber works include: four string quartets (1987, 1991, 1999, 2005), Nymphéas (1983), Capricci; In Shadow (1989), In Sunlight (1993) and Fast Colours (1997).

=== Piano ===
Powers has written a number of works for piano, including Flyer (2004), Piano Sonata No. 1 (1983), Piano Sonata No. 2 (1986) and Sensing (2003). However, the best known of his piano works is The Memory Room (1990/1) written for and dedicated to William Howard, who premiered the piece at the Lichfield Festival on 10 July 1992. In contrast to previous work, it consists of sixteen short pieces. Nicholas Jones pointed out that Powers integrates these keyboard styles into his own style so effectively that 'they are mere ghosts or shadows of their former selves'. In 2003, Powers wrote a second piece for Howard, entitled Vista, and Powers explains that Vista was the first piece in a planned sequence of pieces all reflecting on or interpreting 'aspects of Italian renaissance and baroque gardens.'
