= Dave Danford =

British percussionist musician

David Joel Danford (born 19 June 1984) is a British percussionist. He is best known for his work as a classical percussion soloist but has also worked with numerous dance music producers including BBC Radio 1 DJ Judge Jules.

== Education ==
Dave studied at the Royal Welsh College of Music & Drama, graduating in 2006. During his studies, he became the first and only percussionist to win the college's annual concerto competition, performing Ney Rosauro's first Concerto for Marimba.

== Career ==
In 2005, Danford commissioned a new work for solo percussion and brass band from English composer Derek Bourgeois. The finished piece was named The Tongs and the Bones, a reference to a scene from Shakespeare's A Midsummer Night's Dream, and was performed with the Cory Band at The Sage Gateshead on November 19, 2005.

=== Studio work ===
In April 2007, Danford released his debut solo album, titled Rhythmic Renaissance, on the Alto Publications label. The CD is a collection of accessible music for solo percussion.
Dave features on a number of releases as a session musician including marimba on the album All I Want (2009) by Canadian vocal group Aliqua, vibraphone on the Taran album Catraeth (2009), percussion on Ludwig (2007) and Salomé (2009) from composer Charlie Barber, two singles and two albums with Judge Jules, two singles and one album with DT8 Project and over thirty CDs with the Cory Band.

=== Dance music ===
In 2006, Danford recorded tracks with international dance music producer Darren Tate for the DT8 Project single Narama and album Perfect World. In the same year he began working with BBC Radio 1 DJ Judge Jules and had regularly done so since, featuring on the singles Electronic Snare and Judgement Theme (both 2008) and two albums; Proven Worldwide (2006) and Bring the Noise (2009).

Since 2008, Danford has been a member of Welsh dance music collective Taran, performing festival dates throughout the UK and Europe including the Festival Interceltique de Lorient, one of the world's biggest Celtic music events. The band released their first album Catreath in March 2009, their second album Hotel Rex in March 2011, and new music in May 2018.
