= Association of British Orchestras =

British artistic organisation

The Association of British Orchestras (ABO) is an organisation for the interests of orchestras in the United Kingdom. It was founded in 1948 as the Orchestral Employers' Association, primarily to negotiate with the Musicians' Union and other bodies on behalf of its membership, which consisted almost entirely at the time of orchestras receiving annual funding from the newly established Arts Council of Great Britain. The past decade has seen a size increase for the organisation (from 35 members in 1989 to over 180 today) and its role has expanded to include a range of activities designed to support the development of the UK's orchestral sector.

== Mission ==
The ABO's mission is to support and champion professional orchestras in the UK in their collective ambition to perform music to the highest artistic standards for the widest possible audience by providing advice, support, intelligence, and information. The association's objectives cover three areas of activity: connecting members, championing orchestras, and developing skills.

== History ==
In 1982, the association took on limited company status, becoming the Association of British Orchestras (previously being called the Orchestral Employers' Association). It continues to negotiate the ABO/MU Freelance Orchestral Agreement with the Musicians' Union and represent its membership in discussions and negotiations with a number of other national organisations.

The Association of British Orchestras serves as coordinator of various national projects, including two major sponsorship programs with a large number of member orchestras. A series of nationally coordinated education projects over the past years resulted in the Orchestras in Education program, which existed to promote the education work of member orchestras and to develop the relationship between schools, teachers, and orchestral players.

The ABO has also mounted research initiatives, producing a series of industry reports, such as a comprehensive statistical survey of the UK's orchestral profession, 'Knowing the Score', and a report on noise damage to musicians, 'A Sound Ear'.

- Healthy Orchestra Charter

The Healthy Orchestra Charter is a joint initiative by the ABO and the Musicians' Benevolent Fund (now called Help Musicians). Launched at the 2006 ABO Conference in Newcastle/Gateshead, the Charter aims to set an industry-wise standard of care and to award charter marks to orchestras that are displaying good practice towards the physical, mental and emotional health of employees – both orchestral musicians and management.

- Pearle

The ABO and its members are members of PEARLE* - Live Performance Europe, a league of performing arts employers associations.

- Sustainable touring

The ABO works with Julie's Bicycle, a not-for-profit organisation helping the music industry cut its greenhouse gas emissions that has published the Green Orchestras Guide and Green Charter.

=== Annual Conference ===
The ABO's primary event each year is its annual conference, the major gathering within the classical music industry in the United Kingdom, with around 300 delegates from orchestras from within the UK and abroad, funding agencies, venues, agents, publishers, and suppliers. The principal media partner is Classic FM.

== ABO Trust ==
The ABO Trust is the charitable wing of the Association of British Orchestras. It promotes public musical education and does research projects, research archive, and fundraising.

== Members ==
=== Full members ===
Full membership in the ABO is open to professional orchestras and ensembles which have existed for two or more years in the UK and have undertaken no fewer than 24 public performances. Subscription levels are based on the turnover of each orchestra.

=== Associate members ===
Associate members include professional who have not yet fulfilled the requirements of full membership as well as conservatories, music colleges, youth orchestras, and overseas orchestras.

=== Affiliate members ===
Affiliate membership is for organisations involved with the presentation, support, and commissioning of the work of the Association's members.

=== Corporate members ===
Corporate membership is available to organisations with related interests to the orchestral sector and who share the ABO's aims and objectives, and who wish to be kept up-to-date on current affairs and topics of mutual interest. This includes concert halls, agents, promoters, composers, and organisations. Membership is also open to businesses and sponsors.
