= Guto Puw =

British composer (born 1971)

Guto Pryderi Puw
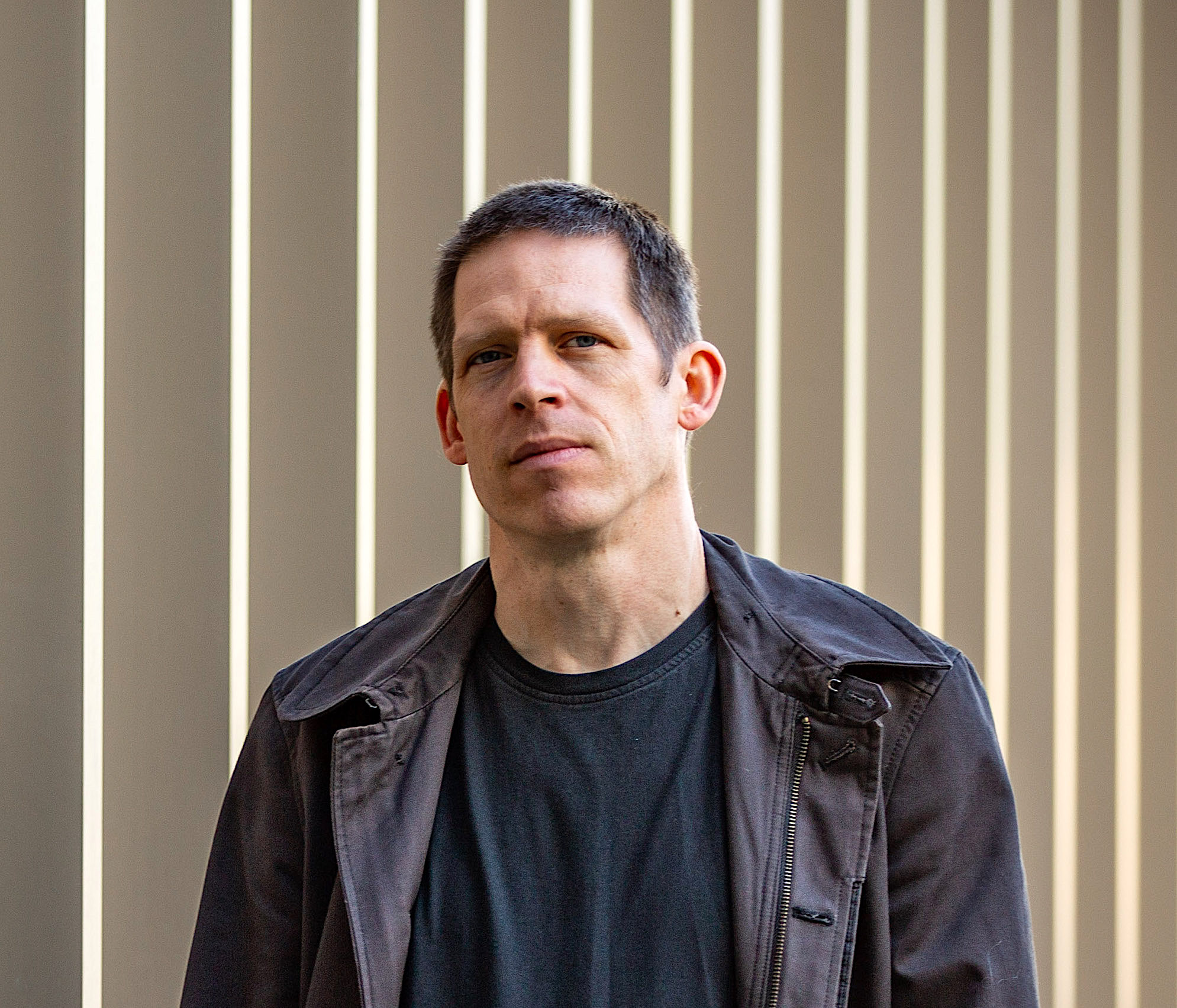
- Guto Pryderi Puw (2018)

Background information
- Born: 1971 (age 54–55)
- Origin: Parc, Bala
- Genres: Classical music
- Occupations: Composer; Conductor; University lecturer
- Years active: 1993–present

Guto Pryderi Puw (born 1971) is a Welsh composer, university lecturer and conductor. He is considered to be one of the most prominent Welsh composers of his generation and a key figure in current Welsh music. Puw's music has been broadcast on BBC Radio 3 and been featured on television programmes for the BBC and S4C. He has twice been awarded the Composer's Medal at the National Eisteddfod.

Puw's works include pieces for unusual combinations of instruments, such as a tuba quartet or a trio consisting of harp, cello and double-bass, as well as more traditional forces such as solo baritone and piano, choir or orchestra. He was associated with the BBC National Orchestra of Wales as its Resident Composer, the first holder of this title, from 2006 to 2010. Puw's own Welsh identity is a recurrent theme in his music: some of his pieces set Welsh-language poetry to music and one of his pieces, Reservoirs, is written about the flooding of Welsh valleys to provide water for England.

== Biography ==
Born in Parc (a village in Gwynedd near Bala), Puw studied music composition at Bangor University with John Pickard, Andrew Lewis and Pwyll ap Siôn. Puw was awarded with a MMus degree in 1996 and a PhD degree in 2002. He was then awarded an Arts Council of Wales bursary and studied with the composer John Metcalf. Puw was appointed as a lecturer in music at Bangor University in 2006, having previously been a Teaching Fellow in Music from 2004. A Welsh speaker, he has been the Welsh Medium Teaching Fellow for the School of Music. He was the founding member and conductor for Côr Cyntaf i'r Felin, a Welsh-language choir based in Y Felinheli near Bangor.

Puw has received commissions from (amongst others) BBC Radio 3, the Welsh baritone Jeremy Huw Williams, the Bangor New Music Festival and the North Wales International Music Festival. He was appointed the first Resident Composer with BBC National Orchestra of Wales (BBC NOW) in 2006 and held this position until 2010. During this time, Puw wrote a concerto for oboe (premiered in 2006) and an orchestral piece, ... onyt agoraf y drws ..., which was first performed to critical acclaim at the 2007 Proms.

He was a founding member and the artistic director of the Bangor Music Festival, a festival for new music in north Wales founded in 2000. He received the Tlws y Cerddor award from the Welsh Music Guild.

== Music ==
=== Welsh links ===
Puw's music is rooted in the language and literature of Wales, with a particular affinity to the poetry of R. S. Thomas. Welsh titles and settings of poetry in Welsh, such as Mecanwaith, Dawns y Sêr, and ... onyt agoraf y drws ..., feature in his work. He has won the Composer's Medal at the National Eisteddfod of Wales twice, winning it first in 1995 for a harp piece, Ffantasia II. In 1997, when the Eisteddfod was held in Bala, he won the Medal for a string quartet, Mecanwaith ("Mechanism") – this piece was later featured in S4C's television series Y Cyfansoddwyr ("The Composers"). Mecanwaith has also been performed by the Duke Quartet at the 1998 Bath International Music Festival and the 1999 Huddersfield Contemporary Music Festival.

=== Orchestral works ===
Puw's oboe concerto was commissioned by BBC Radio 3 and was premiered by the BBC National Orchestra of Wales and their principal oboist David Cowley at Theatr Brycheiniog, Brecon, on 27 April 2006. It takes its inspiration from different qualities of the human voice, including stutters and chatterboxes. Puw has said that "The second movement is inspired by talkative people who won't let you contribute to a conversation", represented by a repeated row of 13 notes played until "it gets rather unbearable". It was broadcast on BBC Radio 3 on 1 March 2007 as part of a programme of music by Welsh composers to celebrate St David's Day. The concerto won Puw the 2007 BBC Radio 3 Listeners Award at the British Composer Awards.

His orchestral piece Reservoirs was inspired by a 1968 poem by R. S. Thomas about the drowning of Welsh valleys such as Tryweryn (a few miles from where Puw grew up) and Clywedog to provide water for England. Puw had a particular affinity with the topic as his grandfather lost farmland in the Tryweryn flooding. Nevertheless, he has said that he "decided not to take the poem too literally because as a composer you can be subject to criticism for doing that." It was nominated in 2005 in the Large-Scale Composition category of the Royal Philharmonic Society Music Awards. The music was used in a BBC2 Wales documentary, "Drowning a Village", broadcast on 9 March 2006. A performance by BBC NOW was broadcast on BBC Radio 3 as part of the 2005 Vale of Glamorgan Festival.

As part of his association with BBC NOW, Puw was commissioned by BBC Radio 3 to compose for the 2007 Proms. His orchestral piece, ... onyt agoraf y drws ... ("... unless I open the door ...") was premiered on 9 August 2007, conducted by David Atherton. It is based on a story from the Mabinogion, a collection of medieval Welsh tales, in which a group of warriors, lately returned from Ireland, feast in Harlech for seven years with the severed head of their leader at the head of the table. They then feast in Penfro for eighty years in a hall with three doors, and only remember the dreadful events that happened in Ireland when the third door opens. Each of the three doors in Penfro was represented by an instrument in a box in the Royal Albert Hall.

In recent years, each movement of his lyrical Violin Concerto - Soft Stillness (2012–14) uses quotations from the 5th Act of Shakespeare's The Merchant of Venice as inspiration. The orchestral work Camouflage (2017–18) is constructed from different layers of textures created by various instrumental combinations. The repeated two-note motif introduced at the beginning and later the ascending scales are gradually concealed within thick blocks of orchestral textures. Often these blocks have been constructed from layers of identical ideas that are repeated within a passage, similar to a pattern found in a typical camouflage.

=== Opera and music theatre ===

In 2009 Hadau was commissioned by the National Eisteddfod of Wales to be performed alongside an installation by artist Christine Mills at the Lle Celf pavilion. Scored for soprano, harp and narrator, the work was inspired by the strong Cerdd Dant tradition particularly found in rural communities of Meirionnydd and other parts of the country.

In 2017 Puw completed his first chamber opera Y Tŵr based on the play by the Welsh playwright, Gwenlyn Parry and to libretto by Gwyneth Glyn. It was premiered by Music Theatre Wales and Richard Baker on 18 May 2017 at the Sherman Theatre, Cardiff during the Vale of Glamorgan Festival. The opera in three acts explores the relationship and emotions between two characters during three specific periods in their lives, during youth, middle age and finally, old age.

=== Other works ===
Unusual instrumentation and unusual performance techniques, including elements of improvisation, are also important features of his work. In 1998 he composed X-ist, a piece for IST (the Improvising String Trio, consisting of harp, cello and double-bass). It was described by reviewers as a "frighteningly frantic" and "challenging" piece. X-ist uses a graphic score and includes written directions to the players that act as "creative stimuli", containing notes and motifs to be followed. The piece also requires the cellist and double-bassist to tap their instruments, as well as use normal playing methods. Another piece requiring improvisation by performers was his commission for the 2001 Bangor New Music Festival, Trioled, which was written for ensemble (saxophone, guitar, harp, keyboard, cello, piano) and optional dancer. In his performing notes, Puw describes the pieces as a "stimulus for musical improvisation" in which any notes, normal or extended musical techniques and/or percussive effects may be applied. Trioled has two contrasting sub-sections, a and b, arranged in the form a-b-a-a-a-b-a-b to match the Welsh poetic measure of the same name, with the strings playing calmly in the "a" sections, and saxophone and keyboard (gradually joined by the other instruments) playing in a more lively manner in the "b" sections. The musicians and the dancer are required to react to each other's contributions in each section to create a "multi-media" experience.

Visages, his 1999 piece for 2 tubas and 2 euphoniums, was described as "astringent, often whimsical but well written for these instruments". Puw said that in the piece "Freedom is granted to the performers to make any subtle facial expressions that add to the musical interpretation". Puw describes Ffantasia III (a piece for solo piano, composed for the 2000 Bangor New Music Festival) as an "intimate reflection" upon the music of, and a tribute to, Robert Schumann, his "intricate compositional style" and "world of delicate expression". The music becomes "simpler and softer" throughout the piece, moving from the "rhythmic complexity" of the opening bars through to slow quavers transforming into triplets. An ensemble piece, different light (for clarinet, violin, cello and piano) was "inspired by the idea of moving a picture from one place to another, be it to another house, or from one room to the next, or even from one wall to another." As the picture is moved, it looks the same but is perceived in a different light. Puw attempts to convey this in musical terms by having each instrument enter separately with its own musical phrase in the first part of the piece. Then, in the second part of the piece, all the thematic material is repeated with the instruments playing simultaneously, so that the music is similarly perceived in a different light. different light was featured at the 2001 UKwithNY festival at the Angel Orensanz Center in New York City. His 2005 composition for the Bangor New Music Festival, Stereo Type, was written for amplified typewriters and tape. It was premiered by School of Music students from Bangor University in the Deiniol Shopping Centre, Bangor, on 5 March 2005.

In 2017 he composed Sustained Clusters (March) for brass quintet and fairground organ, which was first performed by Onyx Brass at the Eastern Shelter, Barry during the Vale of Glamorgan Festival. The work features a series of chordal clusters, repeated descending modal scales and a playful tune, creating a humorous dialogue between the brass ensemble and the fairground organ. His latest piece for street organ was Ffantasia V and was premiere at the Vale of Glamorgan Festival in May 2019.

== List of compositions ==
A list of Puw's major compositions.

Date Composed	Title	Instrumentation	Notes
1993	Ffantasia	violin	
1993	Becoming	soprano, mezzo-soprano, alto, tenor, baritone, bass	Words by R. S. Thomas; first performed by the London Sinfonietta Voices on 27 March 1994
1995	Ffantasia II	harp	Winner of the Composer's Medal at the 1995 National Eisteddfod
1996	Sonata	oboe and piano	Commissioned by the North Wales International Music Festival
1997	Mecanwaith ("Mechanism")	string quartet	Winner of the Composer's Medal at the 1997 National Eisteddfod
1998	X-ist	harp, cello and double-bass	Commissioned and recorded by IST (Improvising String Trio)
1998	Capel Celyn	tenor/high voice and piano	Commissioned by the North Wales Music Festival
1998	The Loch Ness Monster's song	unaccompanied SATB choir	Commissioned by Adlais. View selected pages at Orianna Publications
1998–9	Ad Noctum	flute, clarinet, violin, cello and piano	Commissioned by MusicFest Aberystwyth
1999	Iddi Hi	tenor and piano/harp	Recorded by John Eifion (Sain)
1999	Visages	tuba quartet	Commissioned and recorded by Tubalaté
1999	[https://www.youtube.com/watch?v=VOAKHJ0q6pQCylch+Gwag] ("Empty Cycle")	piano	
2000	Blodeuwedd	baritone and piano	Words by Nesta Wyn Jones; commissioned by Jeremy Huw Williams and recorded by him on "Songs for Jeremy" (Sain, 2000)
2000	"Swyn i estyn bywyd..."	harp	
2000	Ffantasia III	solo piano	Commissioned by the Bangor New Music Festival, premiered by Ian Pace
2000	different light	clarinet, violin, cello and piano	Commissioned by the Vale of Glamorgan Festival
2001	Trioled ("Triolet")	Improvisation for saxophone, guitar, harp, keyboard, cello, piano and optional dancer	Commissioned by the Bangor New Music Festival
2001	Dawns y Sêr ("Dance of the Stars")	baritone and piano	Words by Nesta Wyn Jones, commissioned by Jeremy Huw Williams and the Arts Council of Wales; a version for baritone and orchestra was first performed on 16 March 2007 by Jeremy Huw Williams and BBC NOW conducted by Grant Llywellyn.
2002	Reservoirs	orchestral work for BBC NOW	Commissioned by BBC Radio 3
2003	Ffantasia IV (Canon)	solo organ	Commissioned by North Wales International Music Festival, premiered by Huw Tregelles Williams
2005	Stereo Type	amplified typewriters and tape	Commissioned by the Bangor New Music Festival
2006	Concerto for Oboe and orchestra	oboe and orchestra	Commissioned and premiered by BBC NOW, with oboist David Cowley.
2007	... onyt agoraf y drws ... ("... unless I open the door ...")	orchestra	Orchestral work for BBC NOW for 2007 Proms
2009	Chwyrnu (yn EN) (Snoring (in NY))	SSAATTBB a cappella choir	Commissioned by the Bangor New Music Festival. Premiered by Exaudi, directed by James Weeks, during the BNMF at Bangor Cathedral on 18 March 2009.
2009	Hadau	narrator, mezzo-soprano and harp	Commissioned by the 2009 National Eisteddfod, Y Bala
2009	Agorawd 'Torri'r Garreg'	orchestra	Commissioned by Bangor University as part of their 125th anniversary celebrations, premiered by BBC National Orchestra of Wales. Listen to an extract here
2010	Music for Prams	two percussionists	Commissioned by The Bangor New Music Festival, 20 March 2010
2010	Hologram	orchestra	Commissioned by BBC Radio 3 for the BBC National Orchestra of Wales, premiered during the Bangor New Music Festival, Prichard-Jones Hall by BBC National Orchestra of Wales and Grant Llywellyn on 26 March 2010
2010	Noson Tân Gwyllt (Bonfire Night)	baritone and piano	Commissioned by Jeremy Huw Williams and premiered at the North Wales International Music Festival, St Asaph Cathedral 22 September 2010
2012	Digwyddiad Sugnwr Llwch (Vacuum Event)	three performers	Premiered by the Bangor New Music Ensemble at the Bangor New Music Festival, Powis Hall, 15 March 2012
2012	Naid Sgi (Ski Jump)	one performer	Premiered by the Bangor New Music Ensemble at the Bangor New Music Festival, Powis Hall, 15 March 2012
2013	Trio (lliw) (Trio (colour))	violin, cello and piano	Premiered by the Mozart-Vienner Trio, North Wales International Music Festival, St Asaph, 23 September 2013
2012–2014	Concerto i'r Ffidil – Llonyddwch Tyner (Violin Concerto – Soft Stillness)	solo violin and chamber orchestra	Commissioned by Madeleine Mitchell and Ty Cerdd for the Bangor New Music Festival. Premiered by Madeleine Mitchell and Orchestra of the Swan, conducted by David Curtis, Bangor New Music Festival, Prichard-Jones Hall, Bangor, 14 March 2014
2014	Tair Cerdd Dylan Thomas (Three Dylan Thomas Poems) I - Light breaks where no sun shines II - Should lanterns shine III - Sometimes the sky's too bright	SATB choir a cappella	Commissioned by The School of Music, Bangor University and Pontio. Premiered by the Bangor University Singers during the 'My Friend Dylan Thomas' Festival, Powis Hall, Bangor, 29 October 2014
2016	Fy nghangen lân, fy nghowled glyd (My pure bough, my warm embrace)	flute, clarinet, violin, cello	Commissioned by Reuben Pace for the 'Hearing Orpheus Today' event. Premiered by the Orpheus Ensemble at the Gozo Ministry Hall, Malta on 28 May 2016
2011–17	Y Tŵr (The Tower)	chamber opera in 3 Acts	Commissioned by Music Theatre Wales and Theatr Genedlaethol Cymru. Premiere at the Sherman Theatre, Cardiff during the Vale of Glamorgan Festival on 19 May 2017
2017	(Ymdeithgan) Clystyrau Parhaus ('Sustained Clusters (March)')	for brass quintet and fairground organ	Commissioned by The Vale of Glamorgan Festival. Premiered by Onyx Brass at the Eastern Shelter, Barry during the Vale of Glamorgan Festival on 21 May 2017
2017	'A gwaedd y bechgyn...' ('And the outcry of the boys...')	flute, clarinet, harp	Commissioned by Community Music Projects with financial support from Tŷ Cerdd. Premiered by Ellie Lighton, Sioned Eleri Roberts and Mared Emlyn at Beaumaris Parish Church, Anglesey on 18 November 2017
2017–18	Camouflage ('Cuddliw')	full orchestra	A co-commission by BBC Radio 3 and Tŷ Cerdd. Premiered by BBC National Orchestra of Wales and Jac van Steen as part of the Contemporary Evenings series at Hoddinott Hall, Cardiff on 28 March 2018
2018	Uwchsonig (Ultrasonic)	ensemble	A commission by UPROAR. Premiered by UPROAR under Michael Rafferty at Chapter, Cardiff on 26 October 2018
2019	Ffantasia V	street organ	A commission by Vale of Glamorgan Festival.
2020	Pedwarawd Llinynnol #1 - 'Mae dy lwybrau'n diferu digonedd.' (String Quartet #1 - 'Your paths overflow with plenty')	string quartet	A commission by The Bangor Music Festival. Premiered by the Solem Quartet on 12 March 2021 during the festival.
2022	Popping Candy - "welcome to the world of FIZZ and FUN!'	large ensemble	Commission by UPROAR. Premiered by UPROAR under Michael Rafferty at the Bangor Music Festival, Pontio, Bangor on 12 February 2022.

== Awards and nominations ==
- 1995 – Winner of the Composer's Medal at the National Eisteddfod of Wales for Ffantasia II (harp)
- 1997 – Winner of the Composer's Medal at the National Eisteddfod of Wales for Mecanwaith (string quartet)
- 2005 – Reservoirs (orchestral) nominated in the Large-Scale Composition category of the Royal Philharmonic Society Music Awards
- 2007 – Winner of the BBC Radio 3 Listeners Award at the British Composer Awards for his Oboe Concerto
- 2013 – Sir Geraint Evans Award presented by the "for his significant contribution to Welsh music"
- 2015 – '…onyt agoraf y drws…' was chosen as the 2nd finest orchestral work by a Welsh composer, Gramophone magazine

== Recordings ==
- Reservoirs – Orchestral Works by Guto Pryderi Puw, Signum Records (May 2014). Tracks includes ...onyt agoraf y drws..., Concerto for Oboe, Reservoirs, Hologram and 'Break the Stone' Overture.
- Violin Concerto – Soft Stillness, included on the CD Violin Muse performed by violinist Madeleine Mitchell and the BBC National Orchestra of Wales/Edwin Outwater, Divine Art (October 2017).
- Visages, included on the CD Earth and Moon performed by Tubalaté.
