= Ed Wright (composer) =

British composer

- Born: 4 August 1980 (age 45); Hawridge, Buckinghamshire, UK
- Occupation: Composer
- Children: 1

Edward Charles Wright (born 4 August 1980 in Hawridge, Buckinghamshire) is a British composer known largely for electronic and mixed media sound art.

== Biographical information ==
He studied at Bangor University under the supervision of Andrew Lewis completing a doctorate in mixed electroacoustic and instrumental music in 2010 Edward Wright is actively composing and recording. He lives in North Wales with his partner and daughter. Wright's life was hit by tragedy when his father committed suicide in 2017, deeply affecting his next major work Space to Think.

== Performance and broadcast ==
Wright has performed widely thought the UK and abroad including performances in SARC (Belfast), Electroacoustic Cymru (Wales), St. James Piccadilly (London), Art Forum (Antwerp), ICMC2012 (Slovenia), California State University New Music Festival, NYCEMF (USA) & Toronto Electroacoustic Symposium (Canada). His work is characterised (although not exclusively) by the use of electronic resources especially surround and octophonic sound diffusion systems. Although his output remains somewhat melodic in comparison to many comparable acousmatic compositions, Wright's work has become increasingly driven by philosophical, rather than specifically musical content, as demonstrated in more recent pieces such as Thinking inside the Box and Crosswire; the emphasis is more on the multisensory experience of the music and the underlying discourse rather than a particular tune or melody.

During his time completing his thesis Wright worked on a number of broadcast projects including the tape part and realisation of Stereo Type for Guto Puw broadcast on S4C television in 2005 as part of the Bangor New Music Festival, also appearing on S4Cs Sioe Gelf with a workshop with pupils from Ysgol PendalarS4C television Sioe Gelf 15/4/08, and work being played on BBC Radio 1 Wales Introducing BBC Radio 1 Wales Introducing 5/6/09. His work first achieved international recognition in the IMEB Prix Bourges 2008 for his piece 'Con-chords' IMEB Prix Bourges. He has since gone on to sign to the Blipfonica record label Blipfonica and has released two CDs in the past two years, as well as contributing to the Journal of Creative Studies, the Composers of Wales Newsletter, and Electronic Music Wales. He also did sound for the Conwy Food Festival, Art Video.

== Software development ==
Wright initially developed software within the Max/Msp/Jitter and Csound environments as a way of creating methods to perform otherwise impossible music, as in the case of the 8 channel audio/video mixer devised for 'Harp Set', and the sample/processing/difussion system of 'Polarities'. These have quickly become outmoded as live/electronic mixed music has become more mainstream.

Wright's approach to software design as a method of interfacing with the digital world during live performance brings software design (as in the case of 'Crosswire' and 'Sound games') closer to instrument building, focusing on methods of physical interaction e.g. mouse, Wii Remote and motion tracking controls which provide a wide range of expression yet demand the precision of physical control expected by an instrumental performer.

As well as his performance software Wright has also released a number of composition tools Virtual440 Audio Machine VAM 1 which are available to download in the Max (software) environment.

== Collaborations ==
Wright has worked collaboratively with a number of artists, most especially the photographer and poet Morlo Bach under the title of Virtual Poetry for: 'Passage, In memory of Thomas/Celtic Cross' and 'Broken Glass', and with the author Graeme Harper on 'Seasons'. He also worked on Stereo Type for Guto Puw see above. As part of the Conwy Blinc digital arts festival he also worked with Tim Pugh & Wendy Dawson, Helen Booth and Dominic McGill. Wright is part of the electronic improvisation trio Accretion Entropy notably performing on BBC Radio 3.

== Works to October 2019 ==
- 'Newborough Bluesky', electronic (2001)
- 'In Pace', harp, violin, cello and flute (2002)
- 'Triangulations', small orchestra (2002)
- 'Stereo Type' with Guto Puw (2005)
- 'Passage', music and image installation (2005)
- 'The Way I Saw It', violin and tape (2005)
- 'Enough~?', clarinet and live electronics (2006)
- 'Botany', chorus (2006)
- 'En Masse', electronic (2006)
- 'In memory of Thomas/Celtic Cross', multi-media (2006)
- 'Postcards From Home', electronic (2007)
- 'Broken Glass', music with image installation (2007)
- 'Harp Set', 8 channel surround sound and moving image (2007)
- 'Seasons', chorus and live 4-channel electroacoustics (2008)
- 'Con-chords', 8-channel electroacoustics (2008)
- 'Castell' (with Ysgol Pendalar)
- 'Y Twr', multi-channel installation (2009)
- 'Polarities', orchestra and 8-channel surround live electronics (2009)
- 'Starlight Snowfall', String Ensemble and 4 channel electronics (2010)
- 'Thinking Inside the Box', Stereo fixed media installation (2010)
- 'Crosswire', for electric violin and live processing (2010)
- 'Anatomy of a Mountain Stream', 4 channel fixed media (2011)
- 'Sound Games', electronics and live controllers (2011)
- 'Jackdaws', 4 channel fixed media poetry collaboration with Rhys Trimble (2011)
- 'Who can hear the Sea', Octophonic evolving installation (2012)
- 'DROP!', Marble run sound game installation (2013)
- 'Sonic Wavelab' Sound art and sculpture installation with Charles Gershom (2014)
- 'Xmas-o-lophone' Sound sculpture (2015)
- 'Ricecar' for electric violin and stochastic step sequencer (2016)
- 'Like Shooting-stars Over Petrol Pools' for electric violin, FX and modular synthesis (2017)
- 'Space To Think' acousmatic concert music (2018)
- '1 Mile 365 Days: Stories from running a mile daily for a year' paperback and eBook (2018)
- 'Turbo' stereo acousmatic music (2019)

== Fundraising activities ==
Wright ran at least 1 mile everyday in 2017 to raise money for the Cleft Lip & Palate Association. He completed the challenge running over 500 miles, raising in excess of £2500. It may be relevant to this to note that Edward was born with a bilateral cleft lip and palate.
