= 1987 in Wales =

- Centuries: 18th; 19th; 20th; 21st
- Decades: 1960s; 1970s; 1980s; 1990s; 2000s
- See also: List of years in Wales; Timeline of Welsh history 1987 in The United Kingdom England Scotland Elsewhere

This article is about the particular significance of the year 1987 to Wales and its people.

== Incumbents ==
- Secretary of State for Wales – Nicholas Edwards (until 13 June); Peter Walker
- Archbishop of Wales – George Noakes, Bishop of St David's (elected)
- Archdruid of the National Eisteddfod of Wales
  - Elerydd (outgoing)
  - Emrys Deudraeth (incoming)

== Events ==
- 12 January - The lowest daytime maximum temperature ever recorded in Wales (−8.0 °C) is recorded at Trecastle, Powys.
- 12 February - The Roman Catholic Church in Wales creates a new Diocese of Wrexham and moves the Diocese of Menevia to Swansea.
- 5 March - The High Court declares Dorothy Squires a vexatious litigant.
- 15 March - Roy Jenkins is elected Chancellor of the University of Oxford.
- 14 April - Oakwood Leisure Park opens near Narberth, Pembrokeshire.
- 7 May - District council elections take place across Wales (and England). The Conservatives lose control of Cardiff City Council.
- 24 May - Neil Kinnock is interviewed by David Frost about Labour's defence policy and plans for government.
- 28 May - The Mametz Wood Memorial, sculpted by David Petersen, is unveiled in Cardiff.
- 11 June - In the general election
  - Plaid Cymru's Ieuan Wyn Jones wins the seat of Ynys Môn from the Conservatives. Plaid retain their other two parliamentary seats.
  - Alun Michael replaces James Callaghan as MP for Cardiff South.
  - Labour's Paul Flynn wins back Newport West from the Conservatives.
- 11 July - The Mametz Wood Memorial is dedicated at the site of the Royal Welch Fusiliers battle of 1916 in France.
- 5 October - Keith Best, former Conservative MP for Ynys Môn, having been sentenced to four months' imprisonment for share-dealing activities, has his sentence quashed by the Court of Appeal after serving five days.
- 19 October - Four people are killed in the Glanrhyd Bridge collapse, when a train falls into the swollen River Tywi, as a result of the flooding that affects many parts of Wales.
- 20 November - Roy Jenkins becomes Baron Jenkins of Hillhead.
- 22 November - The Welsh language is used within the Vatican for the first time on an official occasion, as part of a beatification ceremony for three Welsh martyrs.
- date unknown
  - Creation of the Cardiff Bay Development Corporation.
  - Chris Loyn establishes the architectural practice Loyn & Co in Penarth.
  - The National Trust buys Dinefwr Park in Llandeilo, including the deer park.

== Arts and literature ==
- Jim Burns becomes the first non-American to win the Hugo Award for Best Professional Artist.

=== Awards ===
- National Eisteddfod of Wales (held in Porthmadog)
- National Eisteddfod of Wales: Chair - Ieuan Wyn
- National Eisteddfod of Wales: Crown - John Griffith Jones
- National Eisteddfod of Wales: Prose Medal - Margiad Williams

=== New books ===
==== English language ====
- Dannie Abse - Ask the Bloody Horse
- Rees Davies - Wales: The Age Of Conquest, 1063-1415
- Stephen Gregory - The Cormorant
- Douglas Houston - With the Offal Eaters
- J. Beverley Smith - Llywelyn ap Gruffudd
- Frances Thomas - Seeing Things
- Peter Thomas - Strangers from a Secret Land
- R. S. Thomas - Welsh Airs

==== Welsh language ====
- Euros Bowen - Oes y Medwsa
- T. Glynne Davies - Cerddi
- Dafydd Glyn Jones - Drych yr Amseroedd
- Nesta Wyn Jones - Rhwng Chwerthin a Chrio
- Alan Llwyd - Barddoniaeth y Chwedegau
- Gwylon Phillips - Llofruddiaeth Shadrach Lewis
- Rhydwen Williams - Amser i Wylo

=== Music ===
- 3 December - Indian classical musician Ram Narayan records his album Rag Lalit at Wyastone Leys near Monmouth.
- MusicFest Aberystwyth is founded by cellist Nicholas Jones.
- The Alarm - Eye Of The Hurricane (album)
- Anrhefn - Defaid Skateboard a Wellies
- Y Cyrff - Y Testament Newydd (EP)
- Frank Hennessy - Thoughts and Memories (album)
- Karl Wallinger - Private Revolution (album)

== Film ==
- Timothy Dalton makes his debut as James Bond in The Living Daylights.
- On the Black Hill, adapted from the novel by Bruce Chatwin and set in Wales, stars Bob Peck, Gemma Jones and Mike Gwilym.

== Broadcasting ==
=== English-language radio ===
- John Humphrys becomes a regular presenter on BBC Radio 4's Today programme.

=== Welsh-language television ===
- Ioan Gruffudd joins the cast of Pobol y Cwm.

== Sport ==
- BBC Wales Sports Personality of the Year - Ian Woosnam.
- Golf - David Llewellyn and Ian Woosnam win golf's World Cup in Hawaii.
- Rugby union
  - Wales finish 4th in the 1987 Five Nations Championship with just a single win, over England.
  - Wales finish third, their best ever position, in the first Rugby World Cup.
  - 5 April - Pontypool Park hosts the first international for the Wales women's national rugby union team who lose 22–4 to England.
- Skiing - Dry ski slope opened on the Great Orme at Llandudno.

== Births ==
- 9 January - Bradley Davies, rugby union player
- 21 January - Joe Ledley, footballer
- 24 January - Wayne Hennessey, footballer
- 14 February - Lee Selby, World champion boxer
- 24 March - Rob Davies, footballer
- 27 March - Adam Davies, footballer
- April - Hannah Stone, harpist
- 8 May - Aneurin Barnard, actor
- 23 August - Alexandra Roach, actress
- 4 September - Mike O'Shea, cricketer
- 29 September - Claire Williams, athlete
- 21 October - Steph Davies, cricketer
- 30 November - Victoria Thornley, Olympic rower

== Deaths ==
- 5 January - Brinley Williams, Wales dual-code rugby international, 91
- 21 January - Donald Holroyde Hey, chemist, 83
- 4 February - Wynford Vaughan-Thomas, writer and broadcaster, 78
- 7 March - E. D. Jones, librarian, 83
- 4 April - Richard Ithamar Aaron, philosopher, 85
- 13 April - Alfred Evans, Labour MP, 73
- 19 April - Stan Richards, footballer, 70
- 22 May - Keidrych Rhys, poet and editor
- 22 June - William Price, footballer, 83
- 20 August - Dorothy Rees, politician, 89
- 4 September - Richard Marquand, film director, 49 (stroke)
- 11 September - Hugh David, television director, 62
- 25 September - Emlyn Williams, dramatist and actor, 81
- 5 November - Howard Davies, rugby player, 70
- date unknown - Clifford Williams, politician, Labour MP for Abertillery 1965–1970

== See also ==
- 1987 Cardiff City Council election
- 1987 in Northern Ireland
