= Stereotype (disambiguation) =

A stereotype is a simplified generalization about members of a group.

Stereotype(s) may also refer to:

== Music ==
- The Stereotypes, a music production group
- Stereotype (album), a 2022 album by Cole Swindell
- Stereotype (EP), a 2021 EP by STAYC
  - "Stereotype" (STAYC song), 2021
- "Stereotype" (The Specials song), 1980
- "Stereotypes" (song), a 1996 Britpop single by Blur
- Stereo Type (album), 2012 hip hop music album by Strong Arm Steady and Statik Selektah
- Stereo Type (Puw), a 2005 experimental composition by Guto Puw
- Stereotype, a 2014 album by Karl Wolf
- "Stereotypes", a song by Reks from More Grey Hairs, 2009

== Other uses ==
- Stereotype (printing), a duplicate of a typographical element
- Stereotype (UML), an extensibility mechanism of Unified Modeling Language
- Stereotype space, in functional analysis
- Motor stereotype, a disorder or a syndrome

== See also ==
- Stereotypy, a repetitive or ritualistic movement, posture, or utterance
- Stereotypy (disambiguation)
- stereoscopy
- stereoscope
