= John Metcalf (composer) =

John Metcalf MBE (born 1946) is a Welsh-Canadian composer. He has worked in many forms, including large-scale operas, choral and orchestral works, and chamber music, both instrumental and vocal. His music is tonal, and is often rhythmically complex, with much use of polyrhythms.

== Biography ==
John Metcalf was born in Swansea in 1946, and spent his childhood on the Gower Peninsula, at Reynoldston and Penmaen. When he was six, the family moved to Cardiff, where his father had taken a new job. He was educated at Dean Close School, Cheltenham. He intended to read classics at university, but he sent a composition to the composer, Alun Hoddinott, who encouraged him to instead study music at Cardiff University. Following graduation, he went on to study composition with the Australian Don Banks, and electronic music with Hugh Davies in London. In 1971 he became director of music at Atlantic College, near Llantwit Major in Glamorgan, also directing the associated St Donat's Arts Centre as well as the Vale of Glamorgan Festival, which he founded in 1969, developing a lively policy of encouraging performances of contemporary music.

In 1977-8 he spent a year in the United States on a UK-USA Bicentennial Arts Fellowship and found in the teaching of Paul Fetler at the University of Minnesota the kind of stimulus and liberation that his music needed. It was in America that he wrote most of his first opera, The Journey (1979), which went on to be performed by Welsh National Opera in 1981.

He was awarded the Gregynog Arts Fellowship in 1984.

In 1986 he moved to Canada to teach on the Music Theatre course at the Banff Centre in Alberta. He was afterwards appointed artistic director of the programme and Composer-in-residence. At Banff he composed his second opera, Tornrak, with a libretto by Michael Wilcox, drawing on Inuit musical traditions. This and other operas were workshopped there.

In 1991 he returned to Britain and settled at Llanfair Clydogau, near Lampeter, Ceredigion. There he built an energy-saving house from reclaimed materials. He resumed direction of the Vale of Glamorgan Festival, which in 1992 became a festival presenting the work of living composers only.

In 1996 he accepted the artistic directorship of the Swansea Festival which he held until 2007. He teaches at the annual MusicFest Aberystwyth.

In 2009, John Metcalf received one of four inaugural Creative Wales Ambassador Awards from the Arts Council of Wales.. In 2012 he was appointed a Member of the Order of the British Empire (MBE) in the New Year honours, for services to music.

His seventh opera, Under Milk Wood: An Opera, with a text adapted by Metcalf himself from the play for voices by Dylan Thomas, was premiered at Taliesin Arts Centre, Swansea in April 2014. The opera formed part of the centenary celebrations for Dylan Thomas, Swansea's most famous poetic son. The music was perceived to capture the ripeness of Thomas’s vision, never working against the poetry. It was suggested that "those with the deepest knowledge of Thomas’s masterpiece will get the most out of this new work, yet everyone should fall under its strange spell". Under Milk Wood, Taliesin Arts Centre, review: 'an operatic testimony for Dylan Thomas' All of the instrumentalists are on stage all of the time. The normal convention is that instrumentalists in an opera sit behind a music stand. But parts of the music are memorised by the instrumentalists so they can move. How to turn Under Milk Wood into an opera

On 12/13 March 2021, marking the year of John Metcalf's 75th birthday, the School of Music, Drama and Performance of Bangor University, in collaboration with the Bangor Music Festival and Tŷ Cerdd, held an online symposium presenting talks on his music. Metcalf himself answered questions and there were also performances, including premieres of his music.

== Selected works ==
- Auden Songs, voice and piano (1973)
- The Great Question Mark, soprano and orchestra (or piano, 1983)
- The Crossing, music theatre (1984)
- The Boundaries of Time, chorus and orchestra (1985)
- Harp Scrapbook, solo harp (1992)
- Inner Landscapes, piano (1994)
- Paradise Haunts, violin and piano (1995 - orchestrated 1999)
- Kafka’s Chimp, opera for 5 singers, 2 dancers and chamber ensemble (1996)
- Airstream, clarinet and piano (1997)
- Light Music, piano four hands (1997)
- Dances from Forgotten Places, chamber orchestra (1999)
- Mapping Wales, string quarter or string orchestra (2000)
- Passus, large orchestra (2000)
- Transports, clarinet, violin, cello and piano (2000)
- Three Mobiles, piano (2001, version for string orchestra and harp 2003)
- Plain Chants, a cappella choir (2003)
- Cello Symphony (2004)
- A Chair in Love, comic opera for 4 singers and wind quintet (2005)
- Line Dance, string orchestra (2005)
- In Time of Daffodils, baritone and orchestra (or piano - 2006)
- Mountains Blue Like Sea, cello and piano (2006)
- Paths of Song (Llwybrau Cân) for string quartet (2007)
- Septet, harp, flute, clarinet and string quartet (2008)
- Under Milk Wood, opera (2014)
- Sextet, piano and wind (2016)
- Octet (2018)
- Six Palindromes, chamber ensemble (2018)
- Songs without words for string Quintet (2023)

== Discography ==
Several of Metcalf's works are available on the album "In Time of Daffodils". This includes Paradise Haunts, Three Mobiles and In Time of Daffodils. These pieces are performed by the BBC National Orchestra of Wales. (Excerpts from Paradise Haunts were used as part of the Queensland Ballet Company production of A Midsummer Night's Dream.) A complete discography is given on the composer's website.

A recording of Under Milk Wood: An Opera featuring the original cast is due for release by Tŷ Cerdd records on 27 October 2014.
