= ... onyt agoraf y drws ... =

Orchestral piece by Guto Puw

"...onyt agoraf y drws..." (English: "...unless I open the door...") is an orchestral piece lasting approximately 15 minutes by the Welsh composer Guto Puw. It was first performed on 9 August 2007, at the Proms by the BBC National Orchestra of Wales, conducted by David Atherton. Puw was resident composer with the orchestra at the time.

== The piece ==
The composition is based on part of Branwen's story from the Mabinogion, a collection of medieval Welsh tales, in which a group of warriors, lately returned from Ireland, feast in Harlech for seven years with the severed head of their leader, Bendigeidfran, at the head of the table. They then feast in Penfro for eight years in a hall with three doors and only remember the dreadful events that happened in Ireland when the third door opens. The cheerful feasting is represented by a quotation of a Welsh folk tune. Each of the three doors in Penfro was represented by an instrument (trumpet, clarinet, violin) in a box in the Royal Albert Hall. The piece has a mixture of frantic, rhythmical sections and sections of "black-magical stasis". The piece uses novel sound combinations and effects: the opening of the first door is depicted with strumming of piano strings, and the forbidden door opens to the sound of rasping strings and a huge creak in the percussion section. There is then a nightmarish reel from a violinist, representing the memories of Ireland; the violinist at the first performance was positioned at the back of the Royal Albert Hall.

== Critical reception ==
Critics generally responded well to the first performance. The Daily Telegraph's critic described it as a "succession of vivid tableaux" and "liked the way it mixed pictorialism with broader expressions of mood and emotional states". The Guardian's critic described it as a "vivid score", saying that the partnership between composer and orchestra was "clearly bearing fruit" and noting the way that Puw used the huge orchestra with restraint. The Times said that Puw had a "knack for drama", "an orchestral ear" and "a winningly flexible technique". However, the critic added that the "spatial games played with the Albert Hall didn't amount to much, and the piece overall lacks weight", whilst commenting that Puw was a composer "well worth noting".

A second performance took place as part of the Swansea Festival in 2008.
