= Stereotypy (disambiguation) =

A stereotypy is a repetitive behavior related to mental impairment.

Stereotypy may also refer to:

- Stereotypy (non-human), repetitive non-functional behavior in animals
- Stereotypy (printing), the making of duplicate typographical elements

== See also ==
- Stereotype (disambiguation)
