= Tornrak =

Opera by John Metcalf

- Opera by John Metcalf
- Librettist: Michael Wilcox
- Language: English with Inuktitut sections
- Based on: Hidalla by Frank Wedekind
- Premiere: 23 February 1990; Banff Centre

Tornrak is the third opera by Welsh composer John Metcalf. It has an English-language libretto by Michael Wilcox with Inuktitut sections translated by Blandina Makkik. Set between the worlds of the Canadian Arctic and Victorian Britain, it features Inuit throat singing and other extended vocal techniques that give the Arctic scenes a distinct character. The opera was composed between 1986 and 1990 when Metcalf was working in Canada. It was first staged in 1990 in a co-production by the Banff Centre, where Metcalf worked, and the Welsh National Opera who had commissioned the work.

== Composition ==
Although Welsh National Opera (WNO) had first discussed with Metcalf the possibility of his writing a second opera, after The Journey, for them in 1981, it was not until 1986 that Brian McMaster, the company's then managing director, first brought the composer and librettist together. After Wilcox had initially started work on another idea, Metcalf contacted him about the true story of a 19th-century Inuk girl, Milak, who rescued a British sailor, Arthur. Like the character in the opera, the true Milak was shown as a circus freak; unlike her, she returned home.

The development of Tornrak was greatly influenced by Metcalf's move to Canada later in 1986 to teach on the Music Theatre course at the Banff Centre in Alberta. He subsequently became Artistic Director of the programme and Composer-in-Residence. Wilcox visited Metcalf in Canada that winter to work on the first draft of the libretto and used the library facilities there to learn about Inuit traditions and mythology. Metcalf too found that the setting enabled him to portray their subject in a more genuine manner. "If I wasn't in the North itself, at least I could now be in contact with a way of looking at the world, the culture, the music, and the language of the Inuit that would have been absolutely impossible in Wales."

From 1988 onwards, Metcalf tried out sections of the developing opera in workshops at Banff. Such support for new compositions were an important facet of the programme there. He also had ready access to experienced colleagues such as Keith Turnbull, the Assistant Director on the course, and Richard E. Armstrong who had worked with Roy Hart. Just as Peter Maxwell Davies had composed Eight Songs for a Mad King with Hart's unusual voice and extended vocal techniques in mind, so Metcalf was able to compose Tornrak knowing that Armstrong would participate in the opera and also coach the other performers. Armstrong's repertoire of unusual sounds were used in the writing for the spirits and animals. The Inuit parts also required techniques new to Western singers. Fides Krucker, who played the part of Milak in Banff, visited Iqaluit in 1989 and 1990. There she learnt the Inuit throat singing techniques which she used in her performances and on which she advised Metcalf.

Wilcox encouraged Metcalf to make any changes to the libretto that he needed. He himself revisited Banff again to update the text. Even when he was in Britain, he would respond to urgent phone calls to make changes during the workshops. One of the most significant of the changes to the libretto was the decision to translate much of the first act from English into Inuktitut. Differences in stress patterns between the two languages meant that Metcalf recomposed vocal lines, moving material initially intended to be sung into the orchestral parts.

Meanwhile, WNO had agreed to a change in the scale of Tornrak. Instead of it being a chamber opera using just ten singers to be performed in small venues in Wales, it would now use a larger cast including a chorus and be staged in the large venues normally used by the full company. While those who were involved in the project were sure that the final work was stronger than it would have otherwise been, the many changes resulted in severe delays to the opera's completion and led to repeated postponements of the first performance.

== Roles ==
Role	Voice type	Cast in Banff World Preview 23 February 1990 (Conductor:)	Cast in WNO premiere 19 May 1990 (Conductor: Richard Armstrong)
Captain	bass		Ian Comboy
Helmsman	baritone		Quentin Hayes
Arthur	tenor	Christopher Leo King	David Owen
First Mate	baritone		Gwion Thomas
Billy	tenor	Kevin Power	John Harris
Collinson	baritone		Quentin Hayes
Kellett	baritone		David Barrell
A polar bear	extended voice artist	Richard E. Armstrong	Richard E. Armstrong
An apparition	soprano		Louisa Kennedy
An owl tornrak	dancer/movement artist		June Campbell
Milak	mezzo-soprano	Fides Krucker	Penelope Walker
A polar bear tornrak	extended voice artist	Richard E. Armstrong	Richard E. Armstrong
Utak	extended voice artist	Richard E. Armstrong	Richard E. Armstrong
A wolf tornrak	dancer/movement artist		June Campbell
Voice of a wolf tornrak	extended voice artist	Richard E. Armstrong	Richard E. Armstrong
Sir Charles Keighley	baritone		Glenville Hargreaves
Two sailors	baritone		Quentin Hayes
	baritone		Gwion Thomas
Lady Delisle	soprano	Selena James	
PC Evans	baritone		Gwion Thomas
Men in crowd	baritone		Philip Lloyd-Evans
	bass		Gareth Rhys-Davies
	baritone		Jack O'Kelly
Woman in crowd	mezzo-soprano		Susan Vaughan-Jones
Frankie, a bear	extended voice artist	Richard E. Armstrong	Richard E. Armstrong
A bearkeeper	baritone	Kevin Power	Quentin Hayes
A molecatcher	tenor		John Harris
A landlord	baritone		Gwion Thomas
An old whore	soprano		Louisa Kennedy
Judge	baritone		Glenville Hargreaves
Prosecutor	baritone		David Barrell
Usher	bass		John King
Sailors, spirit voices of Inuit hunters, Villagers, Workers	Chorus	Members of the cast	Members of the WNO chorus

== Performance history ==
Tornrak was given a "World Preview Performance", without a chorus, in workshops in Banff on 23 February 1990. This was a co-production with Welsh National Opera with scenery, props and costumes being shared. The first performance by WNO was on 19 May 1990 at the New Theatre, Cardiff, two years later than originally planned. This first Welsh performance, with chorus, is often listed as the official première. A second performance in Cardiff later that month was broadcast on BBC Radio 3. The production was toured to six English cities during June and July.

Fides Krucker, the original Milak, kept the role in her repertoire, performing extracts, for example, at the Royal Ontario Museum in 1994

== Description ==
Tornrak is scored for strings, flute, piccolo, oboe, (doubling cor anglais,) 2 clarinets, (doubling E flat clarinets,) bassoon (doubling contra bassoon,) 2 horns, trumpet, trombone, tuba, piano, vibraphone and separate percussionist. The first act is based on an ascending scale running from C through F to C again using the five black notes; the second act uses a descending scale, again based on C but this time using all white notes taken from the major scale with the exception of the sharpened F (eleventh harmonic).

While the opera is representative of the composer's early musical style, it also advances it. The music is multi-layered and rhythmically complex, much of it using middle colours including woodwind and tuned percussion. In Metcalf's first opera, The Journey, solo instruments, usually high pitched, reacted to the voices; Tornrak makes only occasional use of solo violin or the upper registers of the piano. Extreme colours and registers serve to increase the contrasts already present in earlier works.

On the non-musical level, too, Tornrak develops ideas seen in the composer's earlier works. Metcalf's sometime collaborator, the writer Mark Morris, notes that Metcalf's first two operas and his cantata The Boundaries of Time had already considered such themes as the clash of cultures, the alienation of individuals from their surroundings, the attempts of humanity to communicate with Nature and the displacement of individuals from their homelands. These all appear in his third opera. Tornrak presents the theme of clashing cultures most strongly in two crowd scenes musically distinct from the balance of the score: in the fair and court scenes, the music is vertical, reflecting the clash in values between those present, whereas in most of the opera each layer has its own momentum and the music develops horizontally, representing individual destinies that largely develop autonomously.

The score is remarkable for its incorporation of Inuit throat singing and other extended vocal techniques, establishing distinct sound worlds for the scenes set in the Arctic and those set in Victorian Britain. Indigenous singers took part in the workshops in Banff and also travelled to Wales to train the WNO cast. Although it is not uncommon for opera to mix different national music styles when portraying clashes between cultures, Tornrak stands out because both Inuit music and its singing techniques are foreign to the Western musical tradition.

== Reception ==
The North American performances won the 1991 National Opera Association Award and the Best New Opera award from Opera America. The production team, led by Mike Ashman, won praise for its creativity with the limited resources available.

Reviewing the Welsh premiere, Rodney Milnes described Tornrak as "[a]n absorbing, thought-provoking and very approachable new opera" and as more successful than Metcalf's first opera The Journey. Milnes particularly praises the economy of writing in both the libretto and the score. Hugh Canning wrote of "a new opera which works on its own terms". Both these critics felt that the arctic scenes were the more successful. Paul Griffiths was more reserved about the "pleasant, straightforward fable", finding the vocal lines uninteresting except for the throat-singing but being happier with the orchestral sound.

== Synopsis ==
=== Act I ===
1850, a British naval survey ship, the Endeavour, is in the Canadian Arctic. After being told by the Mate that Arthur Nesbit, a sailor from North Shields, has been behaving in a disruptive manner, the Captain asks him to explain his conduct. The rest of Act I and most of Act II is told in flashback.

1845, the Enterprise, a sister ship of Endeavour, has foundered in the Arctic. Arthur and three others escape into the ice. One of them, Kellett, kills Collinson, a young officer, after they argue over some valuables. Kellett and the last sailor Billy escape without Arthur who is saved from starvation only when he sees a polar bear taking meat from its hidden store. Arthur dreams of returning home and of the rich life he would afford with the valuables. An apparition warns him that he needs to survive first.

Milak, a young Inuk, arrives led by her tornrak, or spirit guide, that takes the form of an owl. She knows of the bear's meat cache and intends to raid it. The tornrak abandons her when she notices signs of Arthur's presence. Milak wonders whether it has led her into a trap. Arthur, in turn, thinks she has come to steal from him.

The bear returns and the two humans fight it. The spirits of Inuit hunters sing that the bear's time has come and Arthur strikes the killing blow. Milak throat-sings with the dying animal and frees its tornrak by skinning it. She gives Arthur the pelt. She leads him towards her village which has been devastated by disease caught from the British. On the way she persuades him to leave behind the valuables that have been slowing him down, but she decides to keep the "Great White Bird flying with many wings", a ship in a bottle that reminds her of her tornrak.

When they return to the village, only Milak's father Utak is still alive. Expecting death, he tears off his clothing and calls his tornrak. It kills him as payment for all the help it has given him since childhood, leaving his bones unburied and his spirit to wander.

During the Winter, Arthur and Milak learn bits of each other's languages. In the Spring, they are discovered by a British ship which has come to trade with the village. The explorer Sir Charles Keighley decides to take Milak to Britain to help with his research. She agrees because she thinks the ship is her tornrak.

=== Act II ===
Sir Charles has given the last of his lectures on the Arctic and is thanked by Lady Delisle at her home. Now he has finished with Milak, he tells Arthur to look after her.

Arthur and Milak, "The Wild Savage of the Frozen North", join a travelling fair in Wales where she is shown to members of the public in a cage. The spectators find her performance frightening. Another member of the fair, a bearkeeper, tries to rape her. Although she escapes him, she is locked in her cage. She persuades the bear to break open the cage and then escape. The crowd are frightened by it and a constable shoots it despite the bearkeeper's pleas. Both he and Arthur find themselves without exhibits.

Milak survives in the country by catching animals such as rabbits and sheep. A molecatcher warns her that she could be hanged for theft. She moves to an industrial town where she becomes a prostitute. She meets Arthur again who tries to persuade her to return to the Arctic but she thinks this is now impossible as she has become Westernised and cut off from Nature. The two are recognised by the bearkeeper who has Milak arrested as the wild woman who has been reported to be stealing sheep. The Judge sentences her to hang despite protests from Arthur and the spectators that she had no other option.

Back on the Endeavour, Arthur has finished his narration. The Captain leaves him in charge of the helm. Arthur tears off his clothes and calls to Milak's spirit in the hope that the ship will be sunk and the Inuit protected from the dangers its crew bring. In a squall, Milak's tornrak arrives, once more in the form of an owl.

Arthur is found dead and frozen to the wheel. Only the Mate is willing to obey the Captain and remove the body. When he throws the corpse overboard, the squall stops and the ship is suddenly becalmed. There is no reading on the compass.
