= Michael Wilcox =

British playwright

Michael Wilcox is a British playwright.

He was resident playwright at the Dovecot Arts Centre in Stockton-on-Tees for the 1977 season. In 1980, he was resident playwright at the Traverse Theatre, Edinburgh. In 2008, he signed a letter against Bush Theatre budget cuts. He was educated at Alleyn Court School, Westcliff-on-Sea; Malvern College in Worcestershire; Borough Road College in Isleworth, London, where he trained to be a teacher; and University College London, where he achieved a BA Honours degree in English Literature.

In the early 1970s, Wilcox founded Northern Playwrights Society with dramatist C. P. Taylor to promote the interests of playwrights living in the Northern Arts region. This has evolved into New Writing North, which is one of Britain's most successful regional writers' agencies.

In addition to his theatre writing, Wilcox edited five volumes of Gay Plays for Methuen, who also published his autobiographical journal of 1989, Outlaw in the Hills. His monograph "Benjamin Britten's Operas" was published by Absolute Press in 1997 and was shortlisted by the Royal Philharmonic Society for its music book of the year award.

Wilcox has also worked as opera librettist for John Metcalf's Tornrak (Welsh National Opera: 1990) and Eddie McGuire's Cullercoats Tommy (Northern Sinfonia and Northern Stage: 1993). For Opera North, he worked with Jeremy Sams on a new libretto for Chabrier's Le roi malgré lui that was first staged at the Edinburgh International Festival as The Reluctant King in 1995.

His television dramas include episodes of Crown Court and Cluedo, Cricket (BBC TV : Plays for Tomorrow:1981), Accounts (C4 : Film on Four:1982), Lent (BBC TV : 1985 : Pye and TRICS awards for best script of the year), Inspector Morse : Last Bus to Woodstock (1988) and Doctor Finlay : Winning the Peace (STV : 1993).

He has also served as a board member for Northern Arts, Northern Stage, NTC Touring Company, and, for some years, was on the Arts Council of England's New Theatre Writing Panel.

His play, Betty and Maud (2010), had its world premiere in the middle of the Pacific Ocean on board a Saga cruise liner.

During the 2012 cricket season he was chairman of Haltwhistle Cricket Club in Haltwhistle, Northumberland.

== Awards ==
- 1980 Thames Television Award
- 1981 George Devine Award
- 1983 British Theatre Association: Most promising playwright
- 1985 Pye Television Award: Best scripted contribution to television for Lent (BBC TV: Screen Two)
- 1985 TRICS Award: Best single play for Lent

== Works ==
Theatre plays:

- The Boy Who Cried Stop, Tyneside Theatre Company 1974
- Grimm Tales, Tyneside Theatre Company, 1975
- The Atom Bomb Project, Tyneside Theatre Company 1975
- Roar Like Spears, Alabama Drama Institute, 1975
- The Backetts Of Bright Street, Dovecot Arts Centre, Stockton-on-Tees, 1977
- Phantom Of the Fells, Live Theatre, Newcastle upon Tyne, 1977
- Pioneers, Dovecot Actors Workshop, 1977
- Mowgli, Dovecote Youth Theatre, 1978
- Dekka and Dava, Newcastle upon Tyne, 1978
- Rents, Traverse Theatre, Edinburgh, 1979
- Werffitt!, Manor Park School, Newcastle upon Tyne, 1980
- Accounts, Traverse Theatre, Edinburgh, 1981
- Lent, Lyric Studio Theatre, Hammersmith, London, 1983
- 78 Revolutions, Traverse Theatre, Edinburgh and Lyric Studio Theatre, Hammersmith, London 1984
- Massage, Lyric Studio Theatre, Hammersmith, London 1986
- Green Fingers, Live Theatre, Newcastle upon Tyne, 1990
- Time Windows, Palace Theatre, Westcliff-on-Sea, 1992
- Rock'n'Roll & Barbirolli, Palace Theatre, Westcliff-on-Sea, 1999
- Mrs Steinberg And The Byker Boy, Bush Theatre, London 2000
- Betty and Maud, Drama at Sea, 2010

Radio plays:

- Standard Procedure, BBC Radio : Afternoon Theatre 1976
- Accounts, BBC Radio : The Monday Play 1982
- Lent, BBC Radio : Saturday Night Theatre 1993

Opera libretti:

- Tornrak, composer John Metcalf : Welsh National Opera 1990
- Cullercoats Tommy, composer Eddie McGuire : Northern Sinfonia and Northern Stage 1993
- The Reluctant King, with Jeremy Sams : composer Chabrier : Opera North 1995

Television dramas:

- Clean Sweep, STV 1981
- Cricket, Plays for Tomorrow, BBC TV 1981
- Accounts, Film on Four, Channel 4 TV 1982
- Midnight Feast, STV 1982
- In Disgrace, STV 1983
- "Burnt Futures", three Crown Court episodes, Granada TV 1983
- "A Party to Crime", three A Case for Justice episodes (entire 18 episode series filmed but never broadcast) Granada TV 1984
- Inspector Morse : Last Bus to Woodstock, Central TV, 1988
- Doctor Finlay : Winning the Peace, STV 1992

== Bibliography ==
- Standard Procedure, Iron Press 1978, ISBN 0-906228-01-8
- Rents, Methuen 1983, ISBN 0-413-51810-8
- Lent, Methuen 1983, ISBN 0-413-53830-3
- Massage & other plays, Methuen, 1987, ISBN 0-413-16080-7
- Green fingers: a play, Methuen Drama, 1991, ISBN 978-0-413-65620-9
- Outlaw in the Hills, A Writer's Year, Methuen, 1991, ISBN 0-413-64910-5
- Gay Plays: Volume 1, Editor Michael Wilcox, Methuen, 1984, ISBN 0-413-52330-6
- Gay Plays: Volume 2, Editor Michael Wilcox, Methuen, 1985, ISBN 0-413-59510-2
- Gay Plays: Volume 3, Editor Michael Wilcox, Methuen, 1988, ISBN 0-413-14740-1
- Gay plays, Volume 4, Editor Michael Wilcox, Methuen, 1990, ISBN 978-0-413-61890-0
- Gay plays, Volume 5, Editor Michael Wilcox, Methuen, 1994, ISBN 978-0-413-68760-9
- Michael Wilcox Plays: 1 : "Rents", "Accounts", "Lent", "Massage", Methuen Drama, 1997, ISBN 0-413-71110-2
- Benjamin Britten's Operas Absolute Press, 1997, ISBN 1-899791-60-4
- Mrs.Steinberg and the Byker Boy Oberon Books 2000, ISBN 1-84002-172-1

Short stories:

- Filipino Sting, included in "Fabulous Tricks", Third House 1992 ISBN 1-870188-18-7
- Alfredo and the Leather Mouse, included in "Bend Sinister" Gay Men's Press 2002 ISBN 1-902852-42-7
- The Haunting of James Elstead, included in "Death Comes Easy" Gay Men's Press 2003 ISBN 1-902852-46-X
- Finding Danger Boy, included in "Serendipity" Gay Men's Press 2004 ISBN 1-902852-48-6
- Dead Man's Hand, included in "A Casualty of War" Arcadia Books 2008 ISBN 978-1-905147-73-1
