= Stereo Type (Puw) =

Stereo Type is a piece by the contemporary Welsh composer Guto Puw. It was commissioned for the 2005 Bangor New Music Festival, of which Puw is the chairman and artistic director.

The piece, which lasts ten minutes, is written for the unusual combination of amplified typewriters and tape. The tape part was created and realised by Ed Wright, a student at Bangor University at the time. Stereo Type was billed as "A sonic journey from the past to the present." It was premiered by students from the School of Music of the University of Wales, Bangor, where Puw is a Lecturer. The first performance took place on 5 March 2005 in the Deiniol Shopping Centre, Bangor. The performance was featured on the S4C television programme Y Sioe Gelf on 20 March 2005.
