= Vale of Glamorgan Festival =

Vale of Glamorgan
- Genre: Music festival
- Location: Vale of Glamorgan
- Country: Wales
- Founded: 1969; 57 years ago
- Artistic director: John Metcalf
- Website: valeofglamorganfestival.org.uk

Under its founder and artistic director, composer John Metcalf, the Vale of Glamorgan Festival was one of Wales’s most flourishing music festivals for over half a century from 1969 until 2023, with the announcement being made in 2024 that it would not longer continue. The decision to close followed the Arts Council of Wales’s rejection of their applications for Lottery funding.

From modest beginnings, with concerts covering the whole gamut of music from medieval to contemporary and set in the context of some of the Vale’s most notable buildings, it expanded considerably over its first two decades.

In 1992 came a change of emphasis and the commitment to a festival focused on presenting the work of living composers, under the banner A Celebration of Living Composers. The aim was not creating a new contemporary music festival for the specialist, but of reintroducing the general, interested listener to the changing face of new music.

The popularity of John Tavener’s The Protecting Veil (nominated for the Mercury prize in 1992) and Henryk Górecki’s Third Symphony topping the classical charts of that era helping confirm Metcalf’s conviction that music was not just about history and dead composers. Featuring music by the Estonian Arvo Pârt was also a determining factor of the success of the 1992 festival.

In 1994, the success of the festival’s new direction was vindicated when they won the prestigious Prudential Awards for the Arts, being awarded not only the £25,000 award for the best music event, but also the £100,000 award for the best overall arts event, ahead of fellow nominees Glyndebourne Festival Opera, the British Film Institute, the West Yorkshire Playhouse and Siobhan Davies Dance Company.

Contemporary classics were brought to a Welsh audience for the first time, the performance of Górecki’s Third Symphony in the 1994 festival being one example, while commissioning new pieces – always part of festival policy – continued to be a significant element under the Living Composers maxim. Among the commissions given their world premiere at the festival were: 1992 John Tavener A Village Wedding; 1994 Sculthorpe Little Suite (Brodsky Quartet); 1995 Michael Torke July (joint commission with the Apollo Saxophone Quartet); 2001 Elena Kats-Chernin Piano Concerto No.2.

The festival established close connections with several of the world’s leading composers, among them Arvo Pärt, Peter Sculthorpe, John Tavener and Peteris Vasks. Steve Reich and his musicians opened the 1993 event and Reich honoured the festival by being president in 2019, marking its 50th anniversary. British composers Gavin Bryars, Steve Martland, Howard Skempton were also frequently programmed, together with Welsh composers such as Guto Puw and Pwyll ap Siôn as well as John Metcalf himself.

Having the composers themselves present at performances whenever possible was a significant element in the festival commitment to bridging the gap between composer and audiences. At the 1996 festival, Arvo Pärt, Peteris Vasks, Urmas Sisask, Bronius Kutavicius and Veljo Tormis were all present at the performance at Llandaff Cathedral given on 13 September by the BBC National Orchestra of Wales, the Estonian Philharmonic Chamber Choir and the Vale of Glamorgan Youth Choir, conducted by Tönu Kaljuste, receiving a sustained standing ovation at the end.

The balance of the 1997 festival was typical, focusing on the music of Terry Riley, Steve Reich and John Adams, together with music by younger British composers influenced by the American minimalists and experimentalists, among them Graham Fitkin who would be a festival regular, Howard Skempton, Charlie Barber and Max Richter.

Early Festivals

The first festival was held in August 1969 with John Metcalf, then only 23, having perceived a distinct need in an area of South Wales which had almost no provision for chamber-scale performances. His aim was to present music of a quality and type appropriate to the settings of some of the vale’s most beautiful and atmospheric buildings, many of them private homes. The historic and atmospheric setting of St Donat’s Castle, whose origins date back to the 12th century, would be the most frequently featured venue over the years; the very first concert was given there, the Venturi Ensemble playing Mozart Wind Serenades, together with the Welsh composer William Mathias’s Wind Quintet Op 22. This was the first instance of a pattern of programming whereby Metcalf – as a composer himself, acutely aware of the need for outlets for new music – included contemporary works alongside the more traditional classical repertoire, as in John McCabe’s Fünf Gedichte against songs by Mussorgsky and Ravel.

While the character and intimacy of the smaller venues lent themselves to medieval and Renaissance music, churches such as Holy Cross in the county town of Cowbridge proved ideal for Baroque music. Many ecclesiastical buildings in this area of South Glamorgan were important in the history of early Celtic Christianity and in performances held in churches, such as St Illtyd’s, Llantwit Major and Ewenny Priory, the aura of history was a significant element of the audience’s experience of the music. This festival tradition meant that, in later years, the spiritual element of the music notably of Pärt, Tavener and Vasks sat well with audiences. and, even if performances weren’t held in a specifically religious context, it was an ongoing connection with the festival’s early years.

The 80s saw the emergence of music theatre as a festival feature, with a ten-year commitment to developing and presenting small-scale works on the stage of the originally medieval Tythe Barn at St Donat’s. The Nuremberg Opera Studio appeared in consecutive years: presenting Catalani’s La Wally in 1980 and Marschner’s Der Vampyr in 1981. In 1983 Oliver Knussen conducted the Music Theatre Ensemble and Music Projects/London, premiering Vaudeville by Michael Finnissy, Gymnopédie and the Black Cat, an assemblage of Eric Satie’s music, together with Stravinsky’s The Soldier’s Tale. In 1985, the Music Theatre Ensemble presented The Crossing by John Metcalf, together with Youkali, which took Kurt Weill’s original song whose theme is the search for a lost paradise as the starting point for a programme of songs and poems by Brecht, Weill and Hanns Eisler (devised by Carmen Jakobi and David Seaman with arrangements by him). In 1986, when Metcalf went to Canada as composer and artistic director at the Banff Centre, David Ambrose, who’d been appointed director of the St. Donat’s Arts Centre, took on the role of the festival’s associate artistic director.

A change of focus

Having continued to be actively involved albeit at a distance, Metcalf’s return to Wales in 1990 saw him take up the day-to-day running of the festival once more and proposing a change of emphasis in the festival which would constitute A Celebration of Living Composers. While there had always been a major commitment to programming contemporary music alongside mainstream repertoire, Metcalf wanted now to focus on the work of living, breathing composers, rather than the long dead and buried. He sought to bridge the gap between composer and audiences, and to connect people with the music in a dynamic way, to show that contemporary music could be both exciting and enjoyable.

1992 was the first festival to ring the changes and together with Arvo Pärt, the featured composers were Olivier Messiaen, Philip Glass, and the Welsh composer Jeffrey Lewis. In 1993, those featured were John Adams, Eleanor Alberga, Charlie Barber, Graham Fitkin, Steve Martland, Michael Nyman, Steve Reich and Kevin Volans. The appearance of composer-based ensembles would also be important, including Steve Reich and Musicians (following on from their notable performance of The Cave in London), the Steve Martland Band and later on the Gavin Bryars Ensemble. Part of the emerging ethos was that, whenever possible, the featured composers themselves would attend. Metcalf saw their presence and participation as a defining element: the audience was not simply getting the opportunity to acknowledge the composers but to meet them, hear them talk and discuss their work, redrawing traditional boundaries. This would become common practice in festivals everywhere but, in 1992, the Vale was breaking relatively new ground.

Living Composers

The festival pursued a deliberately international perspective, with American, Australian, European and Asian composers sometimes making their first UK appearances at the Vale. From being almost unknown, the music of Australian composers – including Peter Sculthorpe, Anne Boyd and Ross Edwards – became familiar, gaining them a loyal following, with Matthew Hindson’s music performed by the ensemble Sinfonia Cymru in the striking location of the glass and steel atrium of the British Airways Maintenance Centre. While committed to a global view, the festival was nevertheless deeply rooted in Wales, programming and commissioning Welsh composers. Metcalf was also concerned to make links with small countries whose cultural traditions had affinities with those of Wales: Finland, Iceland, and the Baltic states, notably Estonia and Lithuania, were the focus of specific festivals in turn, with the relationships forged sustained in ensuing years. Metcalf saw a special connection between the Baltics and Wales, noting the strength of their age-old commitment to choral singing. The appearances of choirs from these countries were a natural reflection of this principle of cultural exchange. The Estonian Philharmonic and Chamber Choirs, Vox Clamantis, also from Estonia, the Finnish Radio Chamber Choir and the Latvian Radio Choir giving memorable performances. Tenebrae conducted by Nigel Short and the Chamber Choir Ireland conducted by Paul Hiller appeared too, with regular contributions from the Vale of Glamorgan Youth Choir.

Wider engagement

The programming of music which highlighted political, anthropological and sociological aspects of composers’ work was a notable factor in the festival’s role in promoting a better understanding of how contemporary composers – like their forebears – were not merely concerned with notes but chose deliberately to engage with the whole of society. For Metcalf, the 1996 performance of the rarely-performed Vepsian Paths from Forgotten Peoples by Veljo Tormis was significant for being a “remarkable cultural document of the Finno-Ugric peoples.” That same year, Max Richter’s Mazuzu Dream focused on the fate of the Nigerian environmental social rights activist Ken Saro-Wiwa, while his later work A House made of Cloud addressed the question of human rights in Tibet. The music of Australian composers who concerned themselves with traditions and places sacred to the Aboriginal peoples offered vivid lessons in history as well as engaging listening experiences.

That same vision of inclusivity saw the consistent programming of music by women composers: featured composers included Judith Weir, Anne Boyd, Hilary Tann, Helena Tulve, and Dobrinka Tabakova, with music by Grace Williams, Sofia Gubaidulina, Eleanor Alberga, Elena Kats-Chernin, Akiko Ogawa, Lynne Plowman, Juste Janulyte Galina Grigorjeva, Carole Finer, Arlene Sierra, Diana Arismendi, Sadie Harrison, Elena Langer, Tatjana Kozlova, Elisenda Fábregas, Santa Ratniee, Chen Yi, Cecilia McDowall, Libby Larsen, Ruth Wall, Errollyn Wallen and Meredith Monk also performed.

Among the British composers whose music was heard frequently were John Tavener, Gavin Bryars, Howard Skempton and Graham Fitkin. Fitkin’s piece Agnostic (1997) was much acclaimed in the 1997 festival, while partially screaming was a 2013 commission for the French ensemble Percussions Claviers de Lyon who gave its premiere at the 2013 festival, going on to establish itself firmly in the group’s repertoire. In a reflection of the festival’s genius loci, music by Welsh composers, or composers who chose to settle in Wales also featured frequently. These included Charlie Barber, Geraint Lewis, Peter Reynolds and John Metcalf himself, with a younger generation of composers such as Pwyll ap Siôn, Guto Pryderi Puw, Steph Power, Gareth Churchill and David John Roche being among those who were commissioned to write new works.

Peter Reynolds Composers’ Studio

A commitment to encouraging young composers was fundamental to the festival with workshops and mentoring. In 2017, the Composer Studio was named in memory of Peter Reynolds, a Vale of Glamorgan Festival stalwart, who died suddenly in 2016. Much respected as composer and teacher, Reynolds’s own works had been heard at the festival; he was for some years its general administrator, also contributing to the comprehensive programme books. From 2017, under the direction of Cardiff University School of Music’s Robert Fokkens, the Composers’ Studio involved linking a younger generation of composers with experienced ones, with performances intrinsic to the process.

As well as relatively conventional orchestral, chamber and ensemble set-ups, the festival periodically challenged its audience with music in which composers used more unusual and original instruments. In 1995, the festival focused on the pianola, with pianolist Rex Lawson playing Conlon Nancarrow’s Studies for Player Piano. In 2000, when the focus was on Celtic countries, John Kenny’s The Cry of the Wolf for solo carnyx heralded the performance of James Macmillan’s The Company of Heaven for youth choir, wind ensemble and carnyx. In 2003, a highlight was music for the toy piano, resembling a tuned glockenspiel, played by Isabel Ettenauer. In 2019, an antique Dutch street organ named Astrid was centre stage in the foyer of the Wales Millennium Centre, and in recognition of the 50th anniversary of the festival 10 composers were commissioned to write short pieces for Astrid.

Vale of Glamorgan Festival Legacy Grants

It was very much in the spirit of John Metcalf’s work as a composer and enabler, as well as of the Festival’s long history that the charity’s farewell gesture was to distribute a limited number of grants of between £2k & £6k for composer-led work in Wales, supporting collaboration between composers and performers. The intention was to reflect the spirit of excitement, enjoyment, and adventure that has characterised the festival since 1969. Grants, administered by Tŷ Cerdd on behalf of the Festival, were awarded to Rob Fokkens, Richard McReynolds, Ashley John Long, Claire Victoria Roberts, Cameron Biles-Liddell, Nathan James Dearden, Richard Baker and Sarah Lianne Lewis.

After initially being a generic classical music festival, the Vale of Glamorgan Festival changed its focus in 1992 to feature exclusively living composers. In recognition of this position, the Vale of Glamorgan Festival received the Prudential Award in 1994.

Highlights include festivals devoted to the music of the Baltic States (1996), Austria (1998) and Australia (2001). The 2002 festival featured a tour to Britain by the Finnish Radio Chamber Choir. 2005 brought a mix of music, visual art, storytelling and food, in a festival with interwoven themes of Japan and the work of women composers.

The 2013 event, held at the St Donats Arts Centre and Cardiff's Hoddinott Hall, was favourably reviewed by The Guardian, highlighting composer Sebastian Currier as the outstanding performance.

Composers John Tavener and Tarik O'Regan formed the focus of the 2014 Festival. BBC NOW broadcasts an annual concert featuring the top five composers from the festival.
