= Adam Davies (footballer, born 1987) =

English-born Welsh footballer

Personal information
- Date of birth: 27 March 1987 (age 39)
- Place of birth: Peterborough, England
- Position: Right-back

Youth career
- Peterborough United
- –2004: Cambridge United

Senior career*
Years	Team	Apps	(Gls)
2004–2007	Cambridge United	15	(0)

International career
2005–	Wales U21	6	(0)
- * Club domestic league appearances and goals as of 23 June 2007

Adam Davies (born 27 March 1987) is an English-born former Welsh footballer who played for Cambridge United and the Wales national under-21 football team.

Davies began his career as a schoolboy at Peterborough United before switching to Cambridge as a trainee. He made his first team debut, while still a trainee, on 29 August 2004 when he replaced Stevland Angus as a second-half substitute in Cambridge's 1–0 win away to Boston United in the Football League Trophy. His league debut came on 10 September 2004 when he replaced Justin Walker as a late substitute in the 1–0 win at home to Bristol Rovers. He made one further league appearance, again as a substitute, as Cambridge struggled in the league and were eventually relegated to the Conference at the end of the season.

Davies signed his first professional contract with Cambridge in November 2005. Despite struggling to hold down a regular place in the Cambridge team, Davies enjoyed international recognition from Wales with his first call up to the Under-21 squad in February 2006 and he has also had trial spells at and Preston North End and Everton. In a match against Exeter City on 4 April 2006, Davies suffered a horrific injury when he was kicked in the neck whilst challenging for a ball, which resulted in Davies receiving treatment for around 20 minutes whilst the club physio and St. John's Ambulance personnel tended to him. He was discharged from hospital the next day. During a game at Dagenham & Redbridge in August 2006, Davies suffered Anterior Cruciate Ligament damage and was ruled out for the entire season.
