= Rhys Trimble =

British poet (born 1977)

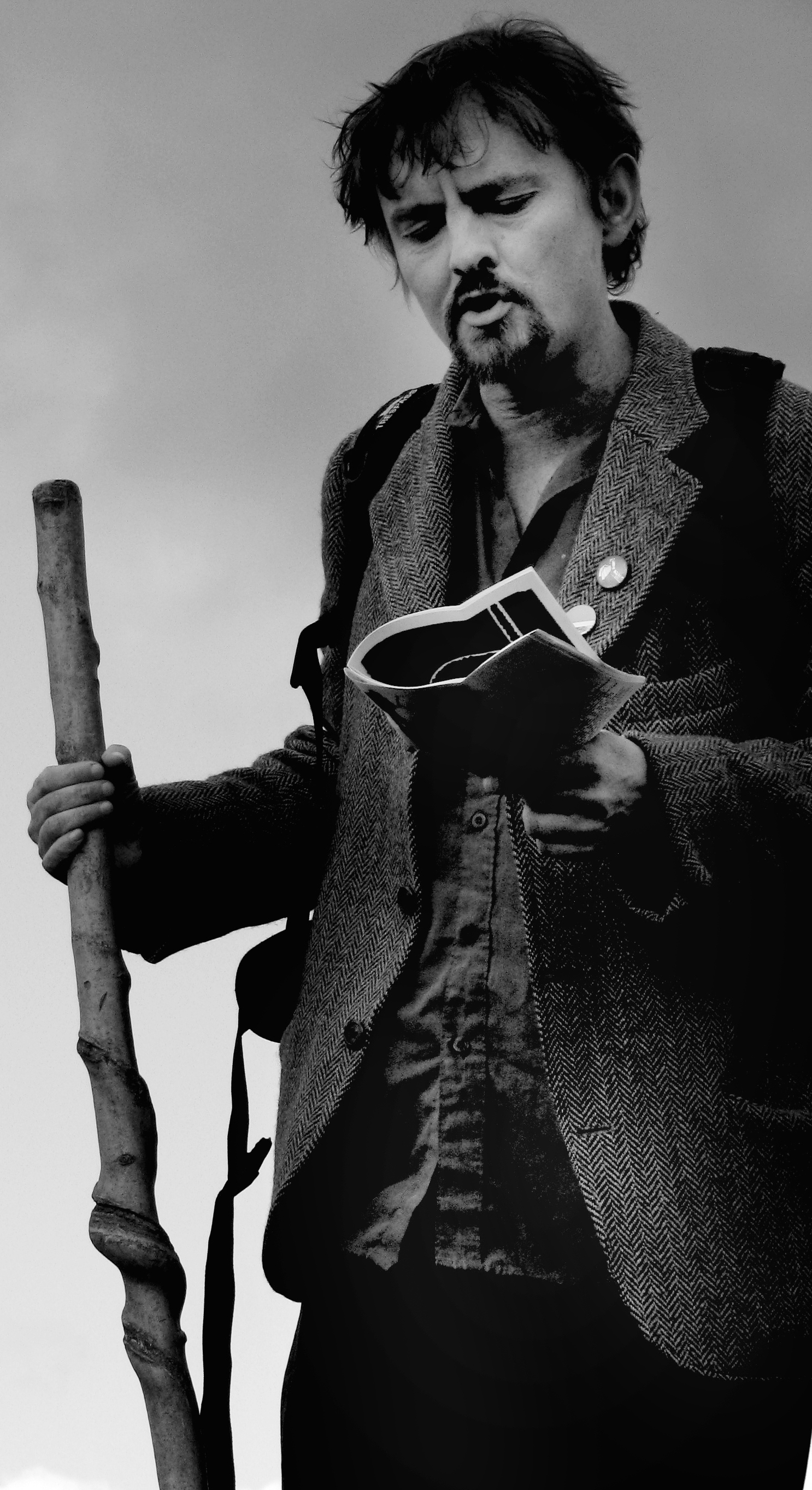
- Born: 9 September 1977 (age 49); Livingstone, Zambia
- Education: BA, Bangor University (2010); PhD, Northumbria University
- Occupation: Poet
- Writing career
- Language: Welsh, English
- Years active: 2008-present
- Genre: poetry
- Notable awards: cinnamon press award
- Website: www.rhystrimble.com

Rhys Trimble (born in 1977) is a bilingual poet, teacher, visual poet, visual artist, musician and improvisational performance artist based in Wales. Trimble was born in Livingstone, Zambia in 1977, and was raised in Pontypool and latterly the head of the Neath Valley - Pontneddfechan. Trimble completed his first degree in biochemistry in the University of Sussex in 1999. Trimble is considered an important part of Welsh avant garde. He completed a BA in literature and creative writing from Bangor University in 2010, and published his first book of poetry, Keinc, the same year. He lives in Bethesda, graduated with a BA in Literature and Creative Writing and has recently published his second novel Drone (Crater Press). Previous books include Keinc, Skine, The Red Book of Hergest Ward and kør (2023). He received a PhD from the University of Northumbria at Newcastle. His doctoral thesis was titled "Tywysogion". He has authored more than 20 books of poetry in Wales, England, India and the US since 2010, including Swansea Automatic, Anatomy Mnemonics for Caged Waves (US) and Hexerisk. He is the vocalist with the Punk/Improv/Noise group Lolfa Binc. And Anxiolytics. Trimble has contributed works to public art in Denbigh, Conwy Valley and Blackpool, Trimble was Nominated for the TS Eliot prize 2016.

He edits the experimental poetry e-zine ctrl+alt-del. since 2008. His work has been translated into Slovak Latvian Anthologized in English and Spanish Galicean, Croatian, Romanian and Turkish. As an academic he has published articles in poetry Wales and had critical essays written on his work by Keely Laufer and Dr Daniel Williams. Trimble has performed in a number of countries around the world, and has taken part in the Gelynion Wales tour and the India-Wales international writing project. He is the founder of Awen 33 Arts, Bangor North Wales, Previous visiting poet at Bangor university and is currently a Bard in the Public Mapping Platform Project.

== Publications ==
- Trimble, R. (2010). Keinc. Maentwrog: Cinnamon Press. ISBN 978-1-907090-02-8.
- —— (2010). Kapita. Newton-Le-Willows: Knives Forks and Spoons Press. ISBN 978-0-9565418-4-0.
- —— (2011). Mynydd. Swansea: Boiled String Press. ISBN 978-0-9569473-1-4.
- —— (2012). Skine. Newton-Le-Willows: Knives Forks and Spoons Press. ISBN 978-1-907812-83-5.
- —— (2012). Trace Agents. Manchester: DeptPress.
- —— (2013). ./fine. Rhydfelin: Literary Pocket Book Press.[ISBN unspecified]
- —— (2014). Hexerisk. Newton-Le-Willows: Knives Forks and Spoons Press. ISBN 978-1-909443-44-0.
- —— (2014). "Plurilingual Poetry". Poetry Wales. 49 (3): 45.
- —— (2014). "Places in Poetry: The Poem as Heterotopia". Poetry Wales. 50 (1).
- —— (2015). rej ect ame nta. London: Contraband Press. ISBN 978-1-910319-20-8.
- —— (2015). Swansea Automatic. Llangattwg: Aquifer Books. ISBN 978-0-9928438-4-7.
- —— (2017). Anatomy Mnemonics for Caged Waves. Xerolage Series. La Farge: Xexoxial Editions. ISBN 978-1936687428.
- —— (2018). The Red Book of Hergest Ward. Newton Le Willows: Knives Forks and Spoons Press. ISBN 9781912211173.
- —— (2019). Y Sidydd. Swanses: Hafan Books. ISBN 9780995496699.
- —— (2019). Alterity 4/Praise Poem to Ostara. Alterity Journal. ISSN 2514-1961.

—— (2020). Treigl. Contraband. ISBN 9781910319154.

- —— (2023). Drone. Crater Press. ISBN 9781387757060.
- —— (2023). Kor. Pamenar Press. ISBN 9781915341136.

== Discography ==
SOLO

2020

- Lleugylch (Album - released July 2020)

2023

- Tintern (Single - released March 2023)
- Amen i Ynad Taliesin (Single on Album Cofi 19 - released August 2023)

2024

- CDMX (EP - released June 2024)

2025

- Ynys Dywyll (Album - released August 2025 with Sionci Records)

Lolfa Binc

2017

- Black Lodge (Album - released June 2017)

2018

- Ystymio/Twitching (Album - released August 2018)

2021

- (Apo)calypso Island (EP - released October 2021)

2022

- Ebill a Phlyg (Single - released February 2022)
- Shiva the Blue Throat (Single - released July 2022)
- CHACHACHA (Single - released November 2022)

2023

- Sugar Romeo (Single - released June 2023)

2024

- Ymbincio (EP - released October 2024)

Anxiolytics

2022

- Numan (Single - released March 2022)
- ESGYN/AMGEN/EIGION (Single - released April 2022)
- DA DA DA (Single - released May 2022)
- Gulag Song (Single - released June 2022)
- ANXIOLYTICS (Single - released July 2022)
- S{R}[C]O[{T}[R]CHED EARTH (Single - released August 2022)
- Atemwende (Single - released June 2023)
- noir boy george (Single - released November 2023)

2025

- lladdwr (Single - released February 2025)
- Live in Leeds/Yn Fyw yn Elfed (Album - released November 2025)

2026

- CERDD SYRCAS (EP - released May 2026)
- Maison Haunté (EP - released June 2026)
- Syrcas Music (Album - released August 2026)

Parking Non-Stop

2008

- Species Corridor (Album - released August 2007 with Klangbad)

ANYSTYWALLT

2025

- UNDONOG (Album - released September 2025)

CIGFA//SEGFA

2026

- Elfed/Elmet (Album - released September 2026 with Difficult Art and Music)

CRiNC

2023

- Cig Cymreig (Album - released September 2023 with Recordiau Noddfa - collaboration on tracks Prydu and Crachach)

2026

- You Are Not Wes Anderson (Single - released January 2026 with Recordiau Noddfa)

Karen Owen & Rhys Trimble

2016

- Lein y Bît yng Nghalon y Bardd (Single - released 2016)

Afal Drwg Efa

2012

- Dan Gadarn Goncrit (Single - released July 2012)
- Gelyn (Single - released July 2012)

HYPNOGOG & Rhys Trimble

2016

- Hypnogog@noddfa (Live Performance Recording - released December 2016)

FAY STEVENS & RHYS TRIMBLE

2018

- Confluence (Single - released June 2018)

ARME / Rhys Trimble / Wolframite

2022

- un dictionnaire de déesses (Album - released April 2023 with Fibrr Records)
