= MusicFest Aberystwyth =

International music festival in Wales

MusicFest Aberystwyth is a fusion of an international music festival and summer school held in Aberystwyth, Ceredigion, Wales. Founded in 1987 by the cellist Nicholas Jones, MusicFest initially started as a small series of concerts. In 1988 a small Summer School was run alongside the concerts which provided chamber music coaching for pianists and string players. MusicFest has since evolved into an international Festival and Summer School.

Throughout the Festival there are daily evening and lunchtime festival concerts, together with student foyer performances and student showcase concerts. The 2009 festival features guest artists and visiting tutors include Orion Orchestra, cellist Guy Johnston, pianist Tom Poster, the National Youth Jazz Wales, Solstice Quartet, Sacconi Quartet.

== Summer School ==
The Summer School offers young and up-and-coming music students an opportunity to study with leading professionals. A team of internationally renowned musicians and tutors, led by Artistic Director Iwan Teifion Davies, offers organised, structured chamber music opportunities. Throughout the week the artists residing coach ensembles, lead workshops, and give master-classes as well as performing in the Festival concerts. Based on the ethos of 'learning through listening, practice & performance', courses are run for string chamber music, solo strings, clarinet, wind chamber music, conducting, composition, saxophone, jazz, voice, and harp. Students also have the opportunity to perform in public.

== Courses ==
In 2026, courses ran included clarinet, violin, viola, cello, composition and flute.

== Guests include ==
- Bryn Terfel - voice
- Mererid Hopwood - poet
- Guy Johnston - cello
- Tom Poster - piano
- Welsh National Opera - orchestra
- Sigyn Fosness - Violin
- Catrin Finch - Harp
- Paul Carey Jones - voice

Performance Venues

- Aberystwyth Arts Centre
- Llanbadarn Church
- Arad Goch

== Friends of MusicFest ==
Friends of MusicFest is a charitable organisation which exists to support individual students attending MusicFest who may not otherwise be able to afford to do so.
