= 1810s in Wales =

- 1800s | 1820s | Other years in Wales
- Other events of the decade

This article is about the particular significance of the decade 1810–1819 to Wales and its people.

== Events ==
- 1810
- 1811
- 1812
- 1813
- 1814
- 1815
- 1816
- 1817
- 1818
- 1819

== Arts and literature ==
=== New books ===
- Thomas Charles - Biblical Dictionary, vol. 4 (1811).
- Dafydd Ddu Eryri - Corph y Gaingc (1810)
- Richard Fenton
  - A Tour in Quest of Genealogy (1811)
  - Memoirs of an Old Wig (1815)
- Joseph Harris (Gomer) - Traethawd ar Briodol Dduwdod ein Harglwydd Iesu Grist (1816)
- Ann Hatton
  - Cambrian Pictures (1810)
  - Chronicles of an Illustrious House (1816)
- Samuel Johnson - A Diary of a Journey Into North Wales, in the Year 1774 (1816)
- Thomas Jones (Dinbych) - Hanes Diwigwyr, Merthyron, a Chyffeswyr Eglwys Loegr (1813)
- William Owen Pughe - Coll Gwynfa (translation of Milton's Paradise Lost) (1819)
- David Richards (Dafydd Ionawr) - Barddoniaeth Gristianogawl (1815)
- John Thomas (Eos Gwynedd) - Annerch Plant a Rhieni oddi ar farwolaeth William Thomas mab Lewis Thomas, Llanrwst (1817)

=== Music ===
- 1811
  - John James - Pigion o Hymnau
- 1817
  - Robert Williams - Llanfair (hymn tune, formerly named Bethel); Williams recorded that the tune was composed on 14 July of this year.

== Births ==
- 1810
  - 12 January - John Dillwyn Llewelyn, botanist and pioneer photographer (d. 1882)
  - 15 January - John Evan Thomas, sculptor (d. 1873)
  - 19 January - John Jones (Talhaiarn), poet and architect (d. 1869)
  - 24 January - Thomas Jones, missionary (d. 1849)
- 1811
  - 14 January - Rowland Prichard, musician (d. 1887)
  - 26 January - Roger Edwards, minister (d. 1886)
  - 11 March - Thomas Jones (Glan Alun), poet (d. 1866)
  - 11 July - William Robert Grove, inventor (d. 1896)
  - date unknown - John Williams (Ab Ithel), antiquary (d. 1862)
- 1812
  - 6 January - Catherine Glynne, future wife of William Ewart Gladstone (d. 1900)
  - 3 February - Robert Elis (Cynddelw), poet and lexicographer (d. 1875)
  - 3 April - Henry Richard, pacifist politician (d. 1888)
  - 19 May - Lady Charlotte Guest, translator and philanthropist (d. 1895)
- 1813
  - 30 June - Thomas Briscoe, translator (d. 1895)
  - 1 August - William Ambrose (Emrys), poet (d. 1873)
  - 10 October - William Adams, mining engineer (d. 1886)
  - date unknown - John Edwards (Meiriadog), poet (d. 1906)
- 1814
  - 5 March - Joseph Edwards, sculptor (d. 1882)
  - date unknown - Eliezer Pugh, philanthropist (d. 1903)
- 1815
  - 24 January - Thomas Gee, publisher (d. 1898)
  - 16 April - Henry Austin Bruce, 1st Baron Aberdare (d. 1895)
  - May - William Lucas Collins, author (d. 1887)
  - 21 November - John Bowen, Bishop of Sierra Leone (d. 1859)
  - 13 December - Thomas Rees, Congregational minister (d. 1885)
- 1816
  - 3 June - John Ormsby-Gore, 1st Baron Harlech, politician (d. 1876)
  - 11 June - Thomas William Davids, ecclesiastical historian (d. 1884)
  - 16 August - Charles John Vaughan, dean of Llandaff and co-founder of University of Wales, Cardiff
  - date unknown
    - Huw Derfel, poet and historian (d. 1890)
    - Edward Edwards (Pencerdd Ceredigion), musician (d. 1897)
    - Henry Robertson, Scots engineer responsible for building the North Wales Mineral Railway (d. 1888)
- 1817
  - 16 August - Rowland Williams, theologian and academic
  - 1 November - Henry Brinley Richards, composer (d. 1885)
- 1818
  - 11 January - Daniel Silvan Evans, lexicographer (d. 1903)
  - 18 December - David Davies (Llandinam), industrialist and philanthropist (d. 1890)
- 1819
  - 4 November - Arthur Hill-Trevor, 1st Baron Trevor (d. 1894)
  - 15 November - Arthur Wynn Williams, physician (d. 1886)

== Deaths ==
- 1810
  - 3 April - Thomas Edwards (Twm o'r Nant), poet and dramatist (b. 1739)
  - 27 June - Richard Crawshay, industrialist (b. 1729)
- 1811
  - 25 September - Joshua Eddowes, printer and bookseller (b. 1724)
- 1812
  - 13 March - Henry Bayly Paget, 1st Earl of Uxbridge (b. 1744)
- 1813
  - 23 March - Princess Augusta, daughter of Frederick, Prince of Wales and mother of Caroline, the Princess of Wales (b. 1737)
  - 17 April - Thomas Edwards (Yr Hwntw Mawr), murderer
  - date unknown - Jane Cave, poet (b. 1754)
- 1814
  - 12 March - Evan Thomas (Ieuan Fardd Ddu), printer and translator (b. 1733)
  - 21 June - Sir Erasmus Gower, colonial governor (b. 1742)
  - 5 October - Thomas Charles of Bala, Welsh Bible pioneer (b. 1755)
- 1815
- 1816
  - 29 June - David Williams, Enlightenment philosopher (b. 1738)
- 1817
  - 16 January - General Vaughan Lloyd, commander of the Woolwich Arsenal (b. 1736)
  - 27 March - Josiah Boydell, artist (b. 1752)
  - 17 July - William Williams of Llandygly (b. 1738)
  - 31 July - Benjamin Hall, industrialist (b. 1778)
  - date unknown - David Hughes, Principal of Jesus College, Oxford
- 1818
  - 12 September - John Thomas (Eos Gwynedd), poet (b. 1742)
- 1819
  - 31 January - Thomas Bevan, missionary (b.c.1796)
  - 8 February - Sydenham Teak Edwards, botanist (b. 1768)
  - 25 June - John Abel, minister (b. 1770)
  - 6 November - Princess Charlotte Augusta of Wales, daughter of the Prince and Princess of Wales (b. 1796)
