= Timeline of British history (1800–1899) =

This article presents a timeline of events in the history of the United Kingdom from 1800 AD until 1899 AD. For a narrative explaining the overall developments, see the related History of the British Isles.

== United Kingdom ==
1800s
1800
1801
1802
1803
1804
1805
1806
1807
1808
1809

1810s
1810
1811
1812
1813
1814
1815
1816
1817
1818
1819

=== Wales ===
1800s
1800
1801
1802
1803
1804
1805
1806
1807
1808
1809

1810s
1810
1811
1812
1813
1814
1815
1816
1817
1818
1819

== See also ==
- Timeline of British history
- History of the British Isles
- History of the United Kingdom
- History of England
- History of Ireland
- History of Northern Ireland
- History of Scotland
- History of Wales
- History of the United Kingdom
