= 1813 in Wales =

- Centuries: 17th; 18th; 19th; 20th; 21st
- Decades: 1790s; 1800s; 1810s; 1820s; 1830s
- See also: List of years in Wales; Timeline of Welsh history 1813 in The United Kingdom Scotland Elsewhere

This article is about the particular significance of the year 1813 to Wales and its people.

== Incumbents ==
- Lord Lieutenant of Anglesey – Henry Paget, 1st Marquess of Anglesey
- Lord Lieutenant of Brecknockshire and Monmouthshire – Henry Somerset, 6th Duke of Beaufort
- Lord Lieutenant of Caernarvonshire – Thomas Bulkeley, 7th Viscount Bulkeley
- Lord Lieutenant of Cardiganshire – Thomas Johnes
- Lord Lieutenant of Carmarthenshire – George Rice, 3rd Baron Dynevor
- Lord Lieutenant of Denbighshire – Sir Watkin Williams-Wynn, 5th Baronet
- Lord Lieutenant of Flintshire – Robert Grosvenor, 1st Marquess of Westminster
- Lord Lieutenant of Glamorgan – John Stuart, 1st Marquess of Bute
- Lord Lieutenant of Merionethshire - Sir Watkin Williams-Wynn, 5th Baronet
- Lord Lieutenant of Montgomeryshire – Edward Clive, 1st Earl of Powis
- Lord Lieutenant of Pembrokeshire – Richard Philipps, 1st Baron Milford
- Lord Lieutenant of Radnorshire – George Rodney, 3rd Baron Rodney
- Bishop of Bangor – Henry Majendie
- Bishop of Llandaff – Richard Watson
- Bishop of St Asaph – William Cleaver
- Bishop of St Davids – Thomas Burgess

== Events ==
- January - Sir Joseph Bailey sells his 25% share in Cyfarthfa ironworks for £20,000.
- April - Thomas Price (Carnhuanawc) moves to Crickhowell to take over several parishes in the vicinity.
- 30 September - Sir Jeremiah Homfray is forced to sell his house at Cwm Rhondda to settle his debts.
- 2 November - Richard Parry Price, heir to the Puleston estates, is created a baronet.
- date unknown
  - Anthony Hill and his two brothers go into partnership at the Plymouth ironworks.
  - The "Branwen ferch Llŷr" sepulchral urn is discovered on the banks of the river Alaw in Anglesey (later placed in the British Museum by Richard Llwyd).
  - The first permanent military barracks in Wales are opened at Brecon.
  - An Independent minister, David Davies, is forced to leave his teaching post at Carmarthen Academy after charges of "immorality" are made against him.
  - David Daniel Davis is appointed a physician at Queen Charlotte's Hospital in London.
  - Charles James Apperley becomes agent for his brother-in-law's estates in Caernarvonshire, taking up residence at Tŷ Gwyn, Llanbeblig.
  - Diana Noel, 2nd Baroness Barham, settles at Fairy Hill, Gower.
  - Thomas Charles of Bala publishes his "rules" for the conduct of Sunday schools.
  - Elijah Waring founds a new periodical, The Cambrian Visitor: a Monthly Miscellany, which fails after eight months.

== Arts and literature ==
=== New books ===
==== English language ====
- Hugh Davies - Welsh Botanology ... A Systematic Catalogue of the Native Plants of Anglesey, in Latin, English, and Welsh
- Walter Davies (Gwallter Mechain) - General View of the Agriculture and Domestic Economy of North Wales
- M. Surrey - Llewellyn, Prince of Wales, or Gellert the Faithful Dog (play)

==== Welsh language ====
- William Owen - Lloffion o Faes Boaz
- William Williams (Gwilym Peris) - Awengerdd Peris

== Births ==
- 30 January - Samuel Prideaux Tregelles, Biblical scholar (d. 1875)
- 2 May - Mordecai Jones, industrialist (d. 1880)
- 30 June - Thomas Briscoe, translator (d. 1895)
- 1 August - William Ambrose (Emrys), poet (d. 1873)
- 12 September - Daniel Jones, missionary (d. 1846)
- 10 October - William Adams, mining engineer (d. 1886)
- date unknown - John Edwards (Meiriadog), poet (d. 1906)

== Deaths ==
- 9 March - Edward Williams, minister and theologian, 62
- 23 March - Princess Augusta of Great Britain, daughter of Frederick, Prince of Wales, and mother of Caroline of Brunswick, later Princess of Wales, 75
- 17 April - Thomas Edwards (Yr Hwntw Mawr), murderer
- 28 July - John Randolph, former Bishop of Bangor, 64
- 11 August (or 12 August) - John Price, librarian, 78
- date unknown - Edward Pugh, artist

== See also ==
- 1813 in Ireland
