= 1815 in Wales =

- Centuries: 17th; 18th; 19th; 20th; 21st
- Decades: 1790s; 1800s; 1810s; 1820s; 1830s
- See also: List of years in Wales; Timeline of Welsh history 1815 in The United Kingdom Scotland Elsewhere

This article is about the particular significance of the year 1815 to Wales and its people.

== Incumbents ==
- Lord Lieutenant of Anglesey – Henry Paget, 1st Marquess of Anglesey
- Lord Lieutenant of Brecknockshire and Monmouthshire – Henry Somerset, 6th Duke of Beaufort
- Lord Lieutenant of Caernarvonshire – Thomas Bulkeley, 7th Viscount Bulkeley
- Lord Lieutenant of Cardiganshire – Thomas Johnes
- Lord Lieutenant of Carmarthenshire – George Rice, 3rd Baron Dynevor
- Lord Lieutenant of Denbighshire – Sir Watkin Williams-Wynn, 5th Baronet
- Lord Lieutenant of Flintshire – Robert Grosvenor, 1st Marquess of Westminster
- Lord Lieutenant of Glamorgan – John Crichton-Stuart, 2nd Marquess of Bute (from 2 June)
- Lord Lieutenant of Merionethshire – Sir Watkin Williams-Wynn, 5th Baronet
- Lord Lieutenant of Montgomeryshire – Edward Clive, 1st Earl of Powis
- Lord Lieutenant of Pembrokeshire – Richard Philipps, 1st Baron Milford
- Lord Lieutenant of Radnorshire – George Rodney, 3rd Baron Rodney
- Bishop of Bangor – Henry Majendie
- Bishop of Llandaff – Richard Watson
- Bishop of St Asaph – William Cleaver (until 15 May); John Luxmoore (from 8 June)
- Bishop of St Davids – Thomas Burgess

== Events ==
- 23 January - John Scandrett Harford inherits the family estates on the death of his father.
- 28 March - Opening of the British School for boys at Newport.
- 12 April - Admiral Thomas Foley is knighted.
- 23 May - John Luxmoore replaces William Cleaver as Bishop of St Asaph.
- May or June - Bryn Oer Tramway opens in South Wales.
- 18 June - Henry Paget, 1st Marquess of Anglesey, famously loses a leg at the Battle of Waterloo. General Thomas Picton is killed in the same battle.
- A twice-weekly boat service between Cardiff and Bristol is established.

== Arts and literature ==
=== New books ===
==== English language ====
- Walter Davies - General View of the Agriculture and Domestic Economy of South Wales
- Richard Fenton - Memoirs of an Old Wig
- Thomas Love Peacock - Headlong Hall (anonymous; dated 1816)

==== Welsh language ====
- David Richards (Dafydd Ionawr) - Barddoniaeth Gristianogawl

=== Music ===
- Peter Roberts - The Cambrian Popular Antiquities of Wales

== Births ==
- 24 January - Thomas Gee, publisher (died 1898)
- 16 April - Henry Austin Bruce, 1st Baron Aberdare (died 1895)
- May - William Lucas Collins, author (died 1887)
- 2 June - John Deffett Francis, painter and art collector (died 1901)
- 21 November - John Bowen, Bishop of Sierra Leone (died 1859)
- 13 December - Thomas Rees, Congregational minister (died 1885)
- date unknown
  - Thomas Gruffydd, harpist (died 1887)
  - Richard Kyrke Penson, architect (died 1886)

== Deaths ==
- 5 March - Sir Stephen Glynne, 8th Baronet, 34
- 24 April - John Lloyd, naturalist and politician, 65
- 15 May - William Cleaver, Bishop of St Asaph, 72/73
- 18 June - Thomas Picton, soldier, 56 (killed at the Battle of Waterloo)
- August - Robert Williams, farmer and poet, 70/71
- date unknown - Edward Edwards, Royal Navy officer of Welsh parentage, 73

== See also ==
- 1815 in Ireland
