= 1809 in Wales =

- Centuries: 17th; 18th; 19th; 20th; 21st
- Decades: 1780s; 1790s; 1800s; 1810s; 1820s
- See also: List of years in Wales; Timeline of Welsh history 1809 in The United Kingdom Scotland Elsewhere

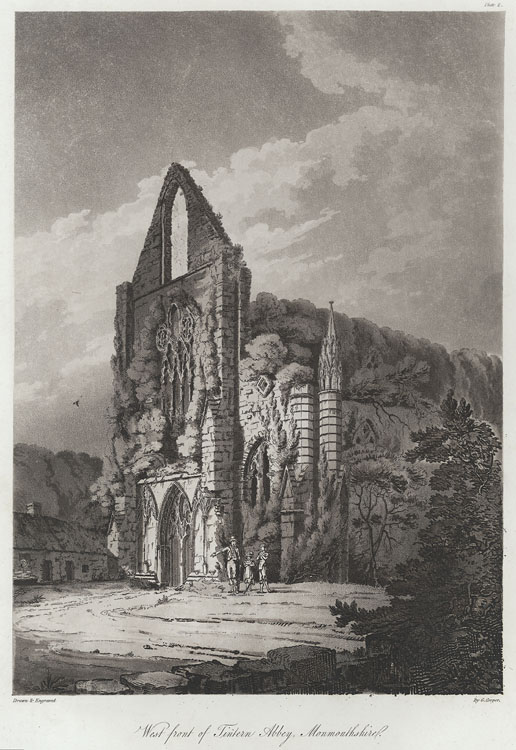
West Front of Tintern Abbey

This article is about the particular significance of the year 1809 to Wales and its people.

== Incumbents ==
- Lord Lieutenant of Anglesey – Henry Paget
- Lord Lieutenant of Brecknockshire and Monmouthshire – Henry Somerset, 6th Duke of Beaufort
- Lord Lieutenant of Caernarvonshire – Thomas Bulkeley, 7th Viscount Bulkeley
- Lord Lieutenant of Cardiganshire – Thomas Johnes
- Lord Lieutenant of Carmarthenshire – George Rice, 3rd Baron Dynevor
- Lord Lieutenant of Denbighshire – Sir Watkin Williams-Wynn, 5th Baronet
- Lord Lieutenant of Flintshire – Robert Grosvenor, 1st Marquess of Westminster
- Lord Lieutenant of Glamorgan – John Stuart, 1st Marquess of Bute
- Lord Lieutenant of Merionethshire - Sir Watkin Williams-Wynn, 5th Baronet
- Lord Lieutenant of Montgomeryshire – Edward Clive, 1st Earl of Powis
- Lord Lieutenant of Pembrokeshire – Richard Philipps, 1st Baron Milford
- Lord Lieutenant of Radnorshire – George Rodney, 3rd Baron Rodney
- Bishop of Bangor – John Randolph (until 9 August); Henry Majendie (from 5 October)
- Bishop of Llandaff – Richard Watson
- Bishop of St Asaph – William Cleaver
- Bishop of St Davids – Thomas Burgess

== Events ==
- 9 February - South Stack Lighthouse off Anglesey first illuminated.
- 10 May - Stapleton Cotton plays a prominent role in the Battle of Grijó.
- date unknown
  - David Hughes, Principal of Jesus College, Oxford, donates £105 towards scholarships to give South Wales the same level of support as North Wales.
  - Hawarden Castle is enlarged.
  - Restoration of Brecon Castle as a hotel begins.
  - John Rice Jones begins lead mining across the Mississippi in the future state of Missouri.
  - Jeremiah Homfray opens a level at Richard Griffiths' lease in Trehafod in the Rhondda; the first full scale attempt to mine coal in the area.

== Arts and literature ==
=== New books ===
- Edward Davies - The Mythology and Rites of the British Druids
- Zaccheus Davies - Cân am y Farn
- Thomas Evans (Tomos Glyn Cothi) - An English-Welsh Dictionary neu Eir-Lyfr Saesneg a Chymraeg
- Theophilus Jones - History of the County of Brecknock, vol. 2
- Henry Parry (editor) Grammatica Britannica, 2nd edition (1st edition by John Davies of Mallwyd)

=== Music ===
- George Thomson - A Selected Collection of Original Welsh Airs (1st edition)

== Births ==
- 18 January - John Gwyn Jeffreys, conchologist (died 1885)
- 15 February - Owen Jones, architect (died 1874)
- 17 April - Thomas Brigstocke, painter (died 1881)
- 24 May - William Chambers, politician (died 1882)
- 26 May - G. T. Clark, engineer (died 1885)
- 12 July - David Williams (Alaw Goch), coal owner (died 1863)
- 11 August - Robert Thomas (Ap Vychan), writer (died 1880)
- 20 August - Morris Williams (Nicander), writer (died 1874)
- 27 October - Lewis Edwards, Nonconformist minister and educator (died 1887)
- 22 December - John Hanmer, 1st Baron Hanmer, politician (died 1882)
- 18 January - Evan James, weaver and mill-owner, lyricist of the Welsh national anthem (died 1878)
- unknown date - David Price, Independent minister (died 1887)

== Deaths ==
- 23 January - Hugh Barlow, politician, 79/80
- 10 February - Hugh Bold, lawyer, 77/78
- April - Charles Francis Greville, founder of Milford Haven, 59
- October 28 - Hugh Pugh, Independent minister, 29

== See also ==
- 1809 in Ireland
