= 1811 in Wales =

- Centuries: 17th; 18th; 19th; 20th; 21st
- Decades: 1790s; 1800s; 1810s; 1820s; 1830s
- See also: List of years in Wales; Timeline of Welsh history 1811 in The United Kingdom Scotland Elsewhere

This article is about the particular significance of the year 1811 to Wales and its people.

== Incumbents ==
- Lord Lieutenant of Anglesey – Henry Paget
- Lord Lieutenant of Brecknockshire and Monmouthshire – Henry Somerset, 6th Duke of Beaufort
- Lord Lieutenant of Caernarvonshire – Thomas Bulkeley, 7th Viscount Bulkeley
- Lord Lieutenant of Cardiganshire – Thomas Johnes
- Lord Lieutenant of Carmarthenshire – George Rice, 3rd Baron Dynevor
- Lord Lieutenant of Denbighshire – Sir Watkin Williams-Wynn, 5th Baronet
- Lord Lieutenant of Flintshire – Robert Grosvenor, 1st Marquess of Westminster
- Lord Lieutenant of Glamorgan – John Stuart, 1st Marquess of Bute
- Lord Lieutenant of Merionethshire - Sir Watkin Williams-Wynn, 5th Baronet
- Lord Lieutenant of Montgomeryshire – Edward Clive, 1st Earl of Powis
- Lord Lieutenant of Pembrokeshire – Richard Philipps, 1st Baron Milford
- Lord Lieutenant of Radnorshire – George Rodney, 3rd Baron Rodney
- Bishop of Bangor – Henry Majendie
- Bishop of Llandaff – Richard Watson
- Bishop of St Asaph – William Cleaver
- Bishop of St Davids – Thomas Burgess

== Events ==
- 5 February - The Prince of Wales becomes Prince Regent.
- 25 March - Sir Joseph Bailey takes over Nantyglo Ironworks.
- 25 May - The Hay Railway is authorised by an Act of Parliament.
- 19 June - The first Methodist Association for the ordination of new ministers is held at Llandeilo. Thomas Charles plays a leading role. The Presbyterian Church of Wales thus secedes from the Church of England.
- 20 August - Thomas Sheasby resigns as engineer of the Aberdare Canal, to be replaced by George Overton. As part of the canal works, a free-standing metal rail bridge is built at Robertstown, Aberdare - the first of its kind in the world.
- 17 September - Completion of The Cob embankment across Traeth Mawr by William Madocks is celebrated. His nearby model town of Tremadog is also completed by this year.
- date unknown
  - At Hereford Assizes, Samuel Homfray and his partners in the Penydarren ironworks sue the Dowlais Company for fouling the Morlais brook with cinders and slag.
  - Pont-y-gwaith is built over the River Taff near Merthyr Tydfil.

== Arts and literature ==
=== New books ===
==== English language ====
- Thomas Charles - Biblical Dictionary, vol. 4
- Richard Fenton - A Tour in Quest of Genealogy
- Ann Hatton - Poetic Trifles
- Peter Roberts - Brut Tysilio (English translation)

==== Welsh language ====
- Thomas Evans (Tomos Glyn Cothi) - Cyfansoddiad o Hymnau
- John Williams (ed.) - Gwaith Prydyddawl ... W. Williams

=== Music ===
- John James - Pigion o Hymnau

== Births ==
- 14 January - Rowland Prichard, musician (d. 1887)
- 26 January - Roger Edwards, minister (d. 1886)
- 11 March - Thomas Jones (Glan Alun), poet (d. 1866)
- 12 March - Mary Pendrill Llewelyn, translator and writer (died 1874)
- 7 April - John Williams (Ab Ithel), antiquary (d. 1862)
- 29 May - Charles Meredith, pioneer grazier and politician in Tasmania (died 1880 in Australia)
- 25 June - Jane Hughes, poet (died 1880)
- 11 July - William Robert Grove, inventor (d. 1896)
- date unknown - John Jones (Shoni Sguborfawr), Rebecca rioter (died 1858)

== Deaths ==
- 1 May - Titus Lewis, Baptist minister and writer, 38
- 30 May - Nicholas Owen, priest and antiquarian, 59
- 4 July - Mariamne Johnes, botanist, 27
- 25 September - Joshua Eddowes, printer and bookseller, 87
- 3 October - Sir John Stepney, 8th Baronet, politician, 68

== See also ==
- 1811 in Ireland
