= 1814 in Wales =

- Centuries: 17th; 18th; 19th; 20th; 21st
- Decades: 1790s; 1800s; 1810s; 1820s; 1830s
- See also: List of years in Wales; Timeline of Welsh history 1814 in The United Kingdom Scotland Elsewhere

This article is about the particular significance of the year 1814 to Wales and its people.

== Incumbents ==
- Lord Lieutenant of Anglesey – Henry Paget, 1st Marquess of Anglesey
- Lord Lieutenant of Brecknockshire and Monmouthshire – Henry Somerset, 6th Duke of Beaufort
- Lord Lieutenant of Caernarvonshire – Thomas Bulkeley, 7th Viscount Bulkeley
- Lord Lieutenant of Cardiganshire – Thomas Johnes
- Lord Lieutenant of Carmarthenshire – George Rice, 3rd Baron Dynevor
- Lord Lieutenant of Denbighshire – Sir Watkin Williams-Wynn, 5th Baronet
- Lord Lieutenant of Flintshire – Robert Grosvenor, 1st Marquess of Westminster
- Lord Lieutenant of Glamorgan – John Stuart, 1st Marquess of Bute (until 16 November)
- Lord Lieutenant of Merionethshire - Sir Watkin Williams-Wynn, 5th Baronet
- Lord Lieutenant of Montgomeryshire – Edward Clive, 1st Earl of Powis
- Lord Lieutenant of Pembrokeshire – Richard Philipps, 1st Baron Milford
- Lord Lieutenant of Radnorshire – George Rodney, 3rd Baron Rodney
- Bishop of Bangor – Henry Majendie
- Bishop of Llandaff – Richard Watson
- Bishop of St Asaph – William Cleaver
- Bishop of St Davids – Thomas Burgess

== Events ==
- 1 January - The first weekly newspaper in Welsh is published, when Seren Gomer is founded by Joseph Harris (Gomer), a Baptist minister in Swansea.
- 3 January - Lampeter is granted its town charter.
- February - Anthony Bushby Bacon sells his mineral rights at Cyfarthfa to Richard Crawshay for £95,000.
- May - Caernarvon and Anglesey Hospital is founded.
- Summer solstice - Thomas Williams (Gwilym Morgannwg) declaims his poem "Heddwch" from the Logan Stone in the presence of the Gorsedd of Morgannwg, at the "second Assemblage"
- 10 September - The last recorded fatal duel in Wales is fought at Adpar, Newcastle Emlyn. Thomas Heslop of Jamaica is killed; a local landowner, Beynon, is found guilty and fined one shilling.
- date unknown
  - Sydenham Edwards founds The Botanical Register.
  - The Admiralty re-locates from Milford Haven to Paterchurch, resulting in the founding of Pembroke Dock.
  - Journalist and preacher Elijah Waring settles at Neath.

== Arts and literature ==
=== New books ===
- John Jones - Natur a Chyneddfau Gweddi (2nd edition)

=== Music ===
- Thomas William - Perl Mewn Adfyd

== Births ==
- January - George Grant Francis, philanthropist (d. 1882)
- 29 January - Edward William Thomas, composer (d. 1892)
- 5 March - Joseph Edwards, sculptor (d. 1882)
- 16 June - Robert Davies (Cyndeyrn), composer (d. 1867)
- date unknown - Eliezer Pugh, philanthropist (d. 1903)

== Deaths ==
- 12 March - Evan Thomas (Ieuan Fardd Ddu), printer and translator, 80?
- 23 April - Richard Jones, clergyman and writer, 57
- 3 May - Thomas Coke, Methodist leader, 66
- 21 June - Sir Erasmus Gower, colonial governor, 71
- 26 September - Owen Jones, antiquary and founder of the Gwyneddigion Society, 73
- 5 October - Thomas Charles of Bala, Bible publishing pioneer, 58
- 16 November - John Stuart, 1st Marquess of Bute, 70

== See also ==
- 1814 in Ireland
