= 1816 in Wales =

- Centuries: 17th; 18th; 19th; 20th; 21st
- Decades: 1790s; 1800s; 1810s; 1820s; 1830s
- See also: List of years in Wales; Timeline of Welsh history 1816 in The United Kingdom Scotland Elsewhere

This article is about the particular significance of the year 1816 to Wales and its people.

== Incumbents ==
- Lord Lieutenant of Anglesey – Henry Paget, 1st Marquess of Anglesey
- Lord Lieutenant of Brecknockshire and Monmouthshire – Henry Somerset, 6th Duke of Beaufort
- Lord Lieutenant of Caernarvonshire – Thomas Bulkeley, 7th Viscount Bulkeley
- Lord Lieutenant of Cardiganshire – Thomas Johnes (until 23 April)
- Lord Lieutenant of Carmarthenshire – George Rice, 3rd Baron Dynevor
- Lord Lieutenant of Denbighshire – Sir Watkin Williams-Wynn, 5th Baronet
- Lord Lieutenant of Flintshire – Robert Grosvenor, 1st Marquess of Westminster
- Lord Lieutenant of Glamorgan – John Crichton-Stuart, 2nd Marquess of Bute
- Lord Lieutenant of Merionethshire – Sir Watkin Williams-Wynn, 5th Baronet
- Lord Lieutenant of Montgomeryshire – Edward Clive, 1st Earl of Powis
- Lord Lieutenant of Pembrokeshire – Richard Philipps, 1st Baron Milford
- Lord Lieutenant of Radnorshire – George Rodney, 3rd Baron Rodney
- Bishop of Bangor – Henry Majendie
- Bishop of Llandaff – Richard Watson (until 4 July) Herbert Marsh (from 25 August)
- Bishop of St Asaph – John Luxmoore
- Bishop of St Davids – Thomas Burgess

== Events ==
- 10 February - Pembroke Dock's first Royal Navy ships are launched: HMS Ariadne and HMS Valorous.
- 7 May - Hay Railway opens throughout.
- 24 July - Old Wye Bridge, Chepstow (rebuilt in cast iron), is opened across the River Wye.
- 9 October - Fanny Imlay, half-sister of Mary Wollstonecraft Godwin, takes a room at the Mackworth Arms in Swansea, and instructs the maid not to disturb her. The following day she is found dead, having taken a fatal dose of laudanum.
- Nantyglo Round Towers built.
- Taliesin Williams, son of Iolo Morganwg, opens a school at Merthyr Tydfil.

== Arts and literature ==
=== New books ===
==== English language ====
- Ann Hatton - Chronicles of an Illustrious House
- Samuel Johnson - A Diary of a Journey Into North Wales, in the Year 1774

==== Welsh language ====
- Jane Ellis - Cerddi (first published Welsh language book by a woman)
- Joseph Harris (Gomer) - Traethawd ar Briodol Dduwdod ein Harglwydd Iesu Grist

=== Music ===
- John Ellis - Mawl yr Arglwydd (collection of hymns)

== Births ==
- 11 January - Henry Robertson, Scots engineer responsible for building the North Wales Mineral Railway (d. 1888)
- 7 March - Huw Derfel Hughes, poet and historian (d. 1890)
- 3 June - John Ormsby-Gore, 1st Baron Harlech, politician (d. 1876)
- 11 June - Thomas William Davids, ecclesiastical historian (d. 1884)
- 16 August - Charles John Vaughan, dean of Llandaff and co-founder of University of Wales, Cardiff
- date unknown
  - Edward Edwards (Pencerdd Ceredigion), musician (d. 1897)
  - Edward Meredith Price, composer (d. 1898)

== Deaths ==
- 23 April - Thomas Johnes, landowner and politician, 67
- 18 June - Thomas Henry, apothecary, 81
- 29 June - David Williams, Enlightenment philosopher, 78
- 4 July - Richard Watson, Bishop of Llandaff, 78
- 17 July - John Lewis, missionary, about 24 (fever)
- 10 October - Fanny Imlay, half-sister of Mary Shelley, 22 (committed suicide at the Mackworth Arms in Swansea)
- date unknown
  - Benjamin Davies, first Baptist minister at Haverfordwest (age unknown)
  - David Jones, barrister ("the Welsh Freeholder"), c.51

== See also ==
- 1816 in Ireland
