= 1817 in Wales =

- Centuries: 17th; 18th; 19th; 20th; 21st
- Decades: 1790s; 1800s; 1810s; 1820s; 1830s
- See also: List of years in Wales; Timeline of Welsh history 1817 in The United Kingdom Scotland Elsewhere

This article is about the particular significance of the year 1817 to Wales and its people.

== Incumbents ==
- Lord Lieutenant of Anglesey – Henry Paget, 1st Marquess of Anglesey
- Lord Lieutenant of Brecknockshire and Monmouthshire – Henry Somerset, 6th Duke of Beaufort
- Lord Lieutenant of Caernarvonshire – Thomas Bulkeley, 7th Viscount Bulkeley
- Lord Lieutenant of Cardiganshire – William Edward Powell (from 22 November)
- Lord Lieutenant of Carmarthenshire – George Rice, 3rd Baron Dynevor
- Lord Lieutenant of Denbighshire – Sir Watkin Williams-Wynn, 5th Baronet
- Lord Lieutenant of Flintshire – Robert Grosvenor, 1st Marquess of Westminster
- Lord Lieutenant of Glamorgan – John Crichton-Stuart, 2nd Marquess of Bute
- Lord Lieutenant of Merionethshire – Sir Watkin Williams-Wynn, 5th Baronet
- Lord Lieutenant of Montgomeryshire – Edward Clive, 1st Earl of Powis
- Lord Lieutenant of Pembrokeshire – Richard Philipps, 1st Baron Milford
- Lord Lieutenant of Radnorshire – George Rodney, 3rd Baron Rodney
- Bishop of Bangor – Henry Majendie
- Bishop of Llandaff – Herbert Marsh
- Bishop of St Asaph – John Luxmoore
- Bishop of St Davids – Thomas Burgess

== Events ==
- March - A riot breaks out in Amlwch over food prices, and a ship carrying flour is prevented from leaving the harbour.
- 22 July - Windham Sadler succeeds in crossing the Irish Sea by hot air balloon, landing near Holyhead.
- October John Gibson arrives in Rome to study sculpture with help from Antonio Canova.
- 6 December - Joseph Tregelles Price advertises Neath Abbey ironworks for sale.
- dates unknown
  - Lewis Weston Dillwyn retires from managing the Cambrian Pottery at Swansea.
  - Joseph Harris (Gomer) launches the unsuccessful periodical, Greal y Bedyddwyr.
  - Sir Thomas Frankland Lewis drafts the report on the Poor Law which brings its abuses to the attention of the public.
  - Construction work commences on the first chapel in Tywyn.
  - Approximate date - Britain's longest tramroad tunnel is opened at Pwll du near Blaenavon. The Pwll Du Tunnel is more than a mile (2400 m) in length. Begun as a mineral adit, at this time it carries a horse-drawn double track plateway of approximately 2 ft (600 mm) gauge carrying material for Blaenavon Ironworks; next summer it will be incorporated in Thomas Hill's Tramroad, connecting to the Monmouthshire and Brecon Canal.

== Arts and literature ==
=== New books ===
- Catherine Hutton - The Welsh Mountaineer
- John Thomas (Eos Gwynedd) - Annerch Plant a Rhieni oddi ar farwolaeth William Thomas mab Lewis Thomas, Llanrwst

=== Music ===
- 14 July - Robert Williams composes the famous hymn-tune Llanfair (formerly named Bethel).

== Births ==
- 3 March - Robert Thompson Crawshay, iron-master (died 1879)
- 6 May - John Prichard, architect (d. 1886)
- June - John Corbett, industrialist (died 1901)
- 16 June - Charles Herbert James, politician (died 1890)
- 16 August - Rowland Williams, theologian and academic (died 1870)
- 17 September - Hugh Humphreys, publisher (died 1896)
- 13 November - Henry Brinley Richards, composer (died 1885)
- 17 December - Erasmus Jones, novelist (died 1909)
- Thomas Thomas, chapel architect and minister (died 1888)

== Deaths ==
- 16 January - General Vaughan Lloyd, commander of the Woolwich Arsenal, 80
- 27 March - Josiah Boydell, artist, 65
- 17 July - William Williams (antiquary), author, 79
- 31 July - Benjamin Hall, industrialist, 36
- date unknown - David Hughes, Principal of Jesus College, Oxford

== See also ==
- 1817 in Ireland
