= 1810 in Wales =

- Centuries: 17th; 18th; 19th; 20th; 21st
- Decades: 1790s; 1800s; 1810s; 1820s; 1830s
- See also: List of years in Wales; Timeline of Welsh history 1810 in The United Kingdom Scotland Elsewhere

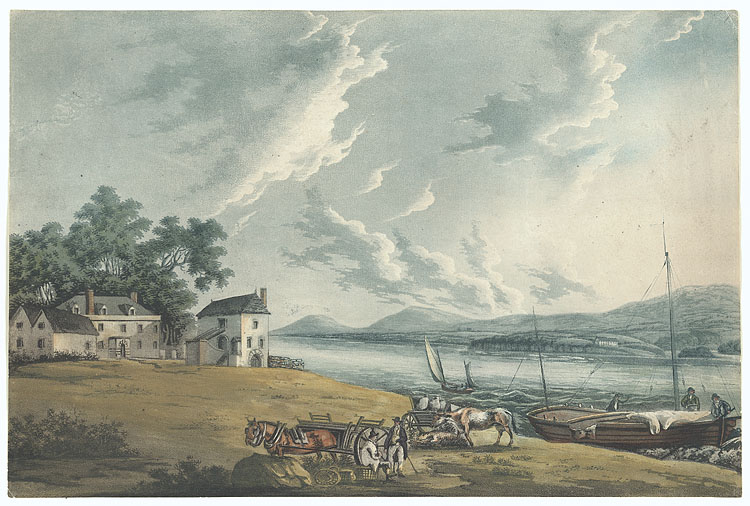
“View at the side of the Severn River showing cattle being unloaded from a boat, horse and cart, and buildings,” a Welsh landscape from 1810, CC0.

This article is about the particular significance of the year 1810 to Wales and its people.

== Incumbents ==
- Lord Lieutenant of Anglesey – Henry Paget
- Lord Lieutenant of Brecknockshire and Monmouthshire – Henry Somerset, 6th Duke of Beaufort
- Lord Lieutenant of Caernarvonshire – Thomas Bulkeley, 7th Viscount Bulkeley
- Lord Lieutenant of Cardiganshire – Thomas Johnes
- Lord Lieutenant of Carmarthenshire – George Rice, 3rd Baron Dynevor
- Lord Lieutenant of Denbighshire – Sir Watkin Williams-Wynn, 5th Baronet
- Lord Lieutenant of Flintshire – Robert Grosvenor, 1st Marquess of Westminster
- Lord Lieutenant of Glamorgan – John Stuart, 1st Marquess of Bute
- Lord Lieutenant of Merionethshire - Sir Watkin Williams-Wynn, 5th Baronet
- Lord Lieutenant of Montgomeryshire – Edward Clive, 1st Earl of Powis
- Lord Lieutenant of Pembrokeshire – Richard Philipps, 1st Baron Milford
- Lord Lieutenant of Radnorshire – George Rodney, 3rd Baron Rodney
- Bishop of Bangor – Henry Majendie
- Bishop of Llandaff – Richard Watson
- Bishop of St Asaph – William Cleaver
- Bishop of St Davids – Thomas Burgess

== Events ==
- January - Novelist Thomas Love Peacock first visits Maentwrog where he will settle for a time.
- 3 March - Launch of the Carmarthen Journal, the oldest surviving newspaper in Wales.
- 14 April - James Cotton, precentor of Bangor Cathedral, marries Mary Anne, daughter of Henry Majendie, Bishop of Bangor.
- 27 September - Thomas Picton serves with distinction under Wellington at the Battle of Bussaco.
- 24 October - The foundation stone of the Moel Famau Jubilee Tower is laid.
- date unknown
  - Walter Coffin takes a mining lease on land at Dinas Rhondda.
  - Hafod Copperworks opens in the Lower Swansea valley.
  - Etcher Charles Norris settles in Tenby.
  - Jonesville, North Carolina, is founded as Martinsborough; the name is later changed in honour of Hardy Jones (1747–1819).

== Arts and literature ==
=== New books ===
==== English language ====
- The Beauties of England and Wales, vol. XI
- Richard Fenton - Historical Tour through Pembrokeshire
- Ann Hatton - Cambrian Pictures
- Sir Samuel Rush Meyrick - History and Antiquities of the County of Cardigan

==== Welsh language ====
- Dafydd Ddu Eryri - Corff y Gainc

== Births ==
- 3 January - John Orlando Parry, actor, musician and songwriter (d. 1879)
- 12 January - John Dillwyn Llewelyn, botanist and pioneer photographer (d. 1882)
- 15 January - John Evan Thomas, sculptor (died 1873)
- 19 January - John Jones (Talhaiarn), poet and architect (died 1869)
- 24 January - Thomas Jones, Methodist missionary (died 1849)
- 4 August - Dan Jones, Mormon missionary (died 1862 in Utah)
- date unknown - Thomas Jones, librarian (died 1875)

== Deaths ==
- 10 March - George Morgan, American merchant of Welsh parentage, 67
- April - Isaac Davis, advisor to the Hawaiian royal family
- 3 April - Thomas Edwards (Twm o'r Nant), poet and dramatist, 71
- 27 June - Richard Crawshay, industrialist, 70
- 12 August - David Jones, Church of England priest who was supportive of Welsh Calvinistic Methodism, 74
- 27 September - John Williams, barrister, 53

== See also ==
- 1810 in Ireland
