= 1819 in Wales =

- Centuries: 17th; 18th; 19th; 20th; 21st
- Decades: 1790s; 1800s; 1810s; 1820s; 1830s
- See also: List of years in Wales; Timeline of Welsh history 1819 in The United Kingdom England Scotland Elsewhere

This article is about the particular significance of the year 1819 to Wales and its people.

== Incumbents ==
- Lord Lieutenant of Anglesey – Henry Paget, 1st Marquess of Anglesey
- Lord Lieutenant of Brecknockshire and Monmouthshire – Henry Somerset, 6th Duke of Beaufort
- Lord Lieutenant of Caernarvonshire – Thomas Bulkeley, 7th Viscount Bulkeley
- Lord Lieutenant of Cardiganshire – William Edward Powell
- Lord Lieutenant of Carmarthenshire – George Rice, 3rd Baron Dynevor
- Lord Lieutenant of Denbighshire – Sir Watkin Williams-Wynn, 5th Baronet
- Lord Lieutenant of Flintshire – Robert Grosvenor, 1st Marquess of Westminster
- Lord Lieutenant of Glamorgan – John Crichton-Stuart, 2nd Marquess of Bute
- Lord Lieutenant of Merionethshire – Sir Watkin Williams-Wynn, 5th Baronet
- Lord Lieutenant of Montgomeryshire – Edward Clive, 1st Earl of Powis
- Lord Lieutenant of Pembrokeshire – Richard Philipps, 1st Baron Milford
- Lord Lieutenant of Radnorshire – George Rodney, 3rd Baron Rodney
- Bishop of Bangor – Henry Majendie
- Bishop of Llandaff – Herbert Marsh (until 28 April); William Van Mildert (from 31 May)
- Bishop of St Asaph – John Luxmoore
- Bishop of St Davids – Thomas Burgess

== Events ==
- August – Thomas Telford begins construction of the Menai Suspension Bridge.
- date unknown
  - The embankment on Telford's Holyhead Road through the Nant Ffrancon Pass is completed.
  - The Welsh colony of Cardigan is established in York County, New Brunswick, Canada.
  - Robert Bamford Hesketh begins construction of Gwrych Castle.
  - Scottish-born London India merchant John Christie purchases a substantial tract of the Great Forest of Brecknock from the Crown.
  - John Scandrett Harford and his brothers acquire the Peterwell estate at Lampeter.

== Arts and literature ==
- Major eisteddfodau are held at Carmarthen and Denbigh. The Gorsedd tradition (begun by Iolo Morganwg) becomes formally linked with the eisteddfod at Carmarthen.

=== New books ===
- William Owen Pughe – Coll Gwynfa (translation of Milton's Paradise Lost)

=== Music ===
- "From Greenland’s Icy Mountains", a hymn by Reginald Heber, is sung for the first time, at St Giles' Church, Wrexham.

== Births ==
- 3 March – William Ormsby-Gore, 2nd Baron Harlech (died 1904)
- 4 November – Arthur Hill-Trevor, 1st Baron Trevor (died 1894)
- 7 November – Enoch Salisbury, barrister, politician and bibliophile (died 1890)
- 7 December – John Cambrian Rowland, painter (died 1890)
- 9 December – John Roose Elias, writer (died 1881)
- unknown date – Arthur Wynn Williams, physician (died 1886)

== Deaths ==
- 9 January - William Parry, minister and teacher, 74
- 31 January - Thomas Bevan, missionary, about 24
- 3 February - Mary Bevan, missionary, wife of Thomas Bevan, age unknown
- 6 February - David Davies, clergyman and author, 76
- 8 February - Sydenham Teak Edwards, botanist, 51
- 25 June
  - John Abel, minister, 49
  - Sir John Morris, 1st Baronet, industrialist, 73
- 11 November - Moses Griffiths, artist, 72

== See also ==
- 1819 in Ireland
