= 1818 in Wales =

- Centuries: 17th; 18th; 19th; 20th; 21st
- Decades: 1790s; 1800s; 1810s; 1820s; 1830s
- See also: List of years in Wales; Timeline of Welsh history 1818 in The United Kingdom Scotland Elsewhere

This article is about the particular significance of the year 1818 to Wales and its people.

== Incumbents ==
- Lord Lieutenant of Anglesey – Henry Paget, 1st Marquess of Anglesey
- Lord Lieutenant of Brecknockshire and Monmouthshire – Henry Somerset, 6th Duke of Beaufort
- Lord Lieutenant of Caernarvonshire – Thomas Bulkeley, 7th Viscount Bulkeley
- Lord Lieutenant of Cardiganshire – William Edward Powell
- Lord Lieutenant of Carmarthenshire – George Rice, 3rd Baron Dynevor
- Lord Lieutenant of Denbighshire – Sir Watkin Williams-Wynn, 5th Baronet
- Lord Lieutenant of Flintshire – Robert Grosvenor, 1st Marquess of Westminster
- Lord Lieutenant of Glamorgan – John Crichton-Stuart, 2nd Marquess of Bute
- Lord Lieutenant of Merionethshire – Sir Watkin Williams-Wynn, 5th Baronet
- Lord Lieutenant of Montgomeryshire – Edward Clive, 1st Earl of Powis
- Lord Lieutenant of Pembrokeshire – Richard Philipps, 1st Baron Milford
- Lord Lieutenant of Radnorshire – George Rodney, 3rd Baron Rodney
- Bishop of Bangor – Henry Majendie
- Bishop of Llandaff – Herbert Marsh
- Bishop of St Asaph – John Luxmoore
- Bishop of St Davids – Thomas Burgess

== Events ==
- 31 March - Joseph Tregelles Price and his partners take out a new lease on Neath Abbey ironworks.
- June - In the United Kingdom general election:
  - Samuel Homfray becomes MP for Stafford.
  - John Jones of Ystrad fails to win Carmarthen.
  - Berkeley Thomas Paget, MP for Anglesey, retires from Parliament.
  - John Edwards becomes MP for Glamorganshire.
- August - John Jenkins (Ifor Ceri), parson of Kerry, and Thomas Burgess, Bishop of St David's, agree "to make an attempt to rekindle the bardic skill and ingenuity of the principality ... by holding eisteddfodau in different places in the four provinces".
- date unknown
  - Richard Fothergill retires from his role in managing the Tredegar ironworks with Samuel Homfray. The Sirhowy Ironworks, previously run by Fothergill, is leased to Messrs. Harford of Ebbw Vale.
  - The first slate quarry on the site of what will become Oakeley quarry in Blaenau Ffestiniog (which will be the world's largest underground slate mine) is begun when Samuel Holland, a Liverpool merchant, leases land near Rhiwbryfdir farm from the landlords, the Oakeley family of Plas Tan y Bwlch.
  - Joseph Harris (Gomer) re-founds the periodical Seren Gomer.
  - John Jones (Jac Glan-y-gors) becomes landlord of the King's Head in Ludgate Street, London. His tavern becomes a meeting place for the London Welsh.

== Arts and literature ==
- Poet Felicia Hemans effectively separates from her husband, who goes to live in Rome for his health.

=== Awards ===
- Evan Evans (Ieuan Glan Geirionydd) wins the chair at an eisteddfod in St Asaph.

=== New books ===
- Nicholas Carlisle - A Concise Description of the Endowed Grammar Schools in England and Wales
- Charles Norris - A Historical Account of Tenby

=== Music ===
- Owen Williams - Egwyddorion Canu

== Births ==
- 11 January - Daniel Silvan Evans, lexicographer (d. 1903)
- 10 February - David Lloyd Isaac, author (d. 1876)
- 27 February - Joseph Jenkins, the "Welsh Swagman", poet and diarist (d. 1898)
- 5 November - Edward James Herbert, 3rd Earl of Powis (d. 1891)
- 16 November - Evan Lewis, Dean of Bangor (d. 1901)
- 29 November - Richard Davies, MP (d. 1896)
- 18 December - David Davies (Llandinam), industrialist and philanthropist (d. 1890)
- date unknown - George Augustus Frederick Paget, politician

== Deaths ==
- 21 March - Charles Morgan, Commander-in-Chief of British forces in India, 76
- 15 July - Robert Williams, hymn-writer, 35
- 12 September - John Thomas (Eos Gwynedd), poet, 76
- 13 September - William Richards, minister
- 17 September - Albemarle Bertie, 9th Earl of Lindsey, father of Lady Charlotte Guest, 74

== See also ==
- 1818 in Ireland
