= 1895 in Wales =

- Centuries: 17th; 18th; 19th; 20th; 21st
- Decades: 1870s; 1880s; 1890s; 1900s; 1910s
- See also: List of years in Wales; Timeline of Welsh history 1895 in The United Kingdom Scotland Elsewhere

This article is about the particular significance of the year 1895 to Wales and its people.

== Incumbents ==
- Archdruid of the National Eisteddfod of Wales – Hwfa Môn
- Lord Lieutenant of Anglesey – Richard Davies
- Lord Lieutenant of Brecknockshire – Joseph Bailey, 1st Baron Glanusk
- Lord Lieutenant of Caernarvonshire – John Ernest Greaves
- Lord Lieutenant of Cardiganshire – Herbert Davies-Evans
- Lord Lieutenant of Carmarthenshire – John Campbell, 2nd Earl Cawdor
- Lord Lieutenant of Denbighshire – William Cornwallis-West
- Lord Lieutenant of Flintshire – Hugh Robert Hughes
- Lord Lieutenant of Glamorgan – Robert Windsor-Clive, 1st Earl of Plymouth
- Lord Lieutenant of Merionethshire – W. R. M. Wynne
- Lord Lieutenant of Monmouthshire – Henry Somerset, 8th Duke of Beaufort
- Lord Lieutenant of Montgomeryshire – Sir Herbert Williams-Wynn, 7th Baronet
- Lord Lieutenant of Pembrokeshire – William Edwardes, 4th Baron Kensington
- Lord Lieutenant of Radnorshire – Arthur Walsh, 2nd Baron Ormathwaite (until 12 September); Powlett Milbank (from 12 September)
- Bishop of Bangor – Daniel Lewis Lloyd
- Bishop of Llandaff – Richard Lewis
- Bishop of St Asaph – A. G. Edwards (later Archbishop of Wales)
- Bishop of St Davids – Basil Jones

== Events ==
- 4 February – Penarth Pier is opened.
- 11 April – Rhos-on-Sea Pier is opened.
- 29 March – The National Trust acquires Dinas Oleu, Barmouth, its first property in the UK.
- 1 November – The last turnpike toll-gates in the UK are removed, from Llanfairpwllgwyngyll on Anglesey.

== Arts and literature ==
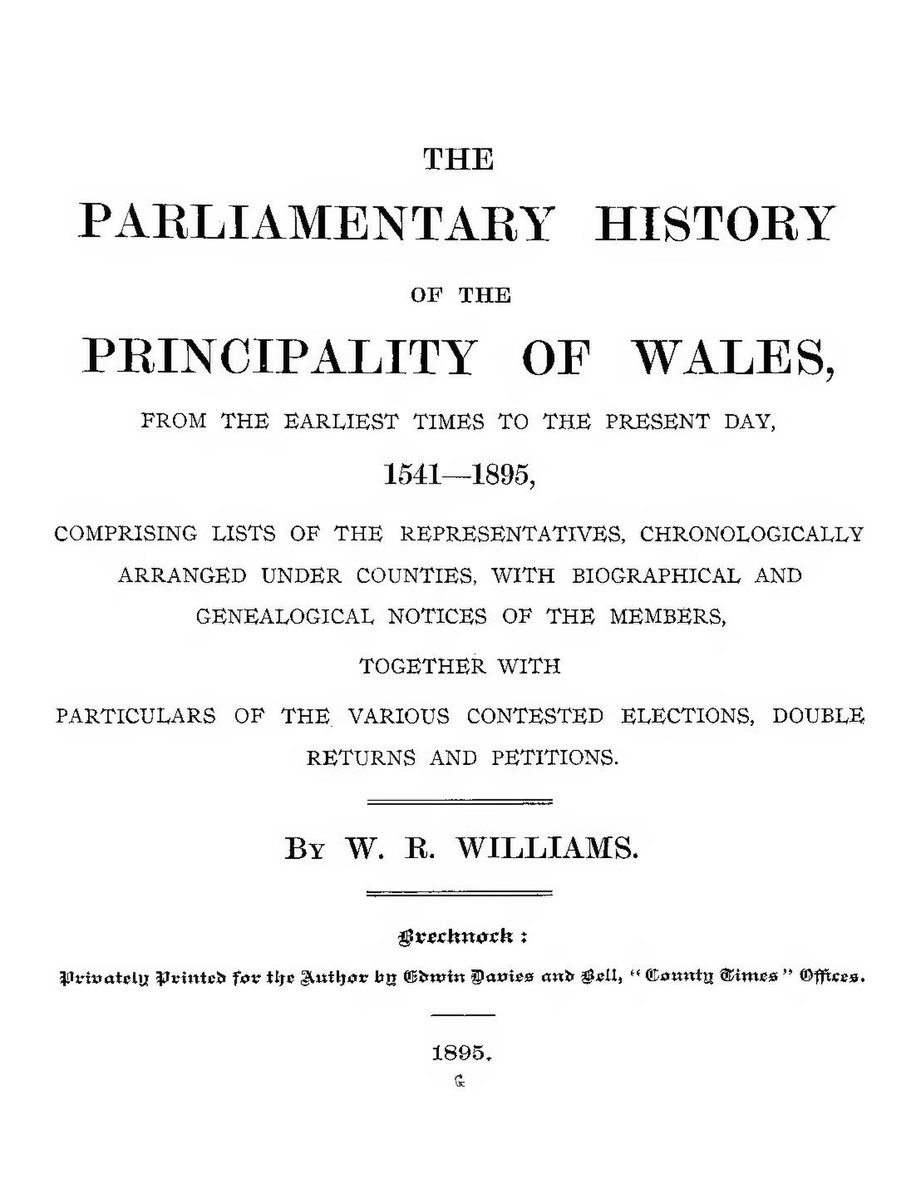
The parliamentary history of the principality of Wales by William Retlaw Williams

=== Awards ===
National Eisteddfod of Wales – held at Llanelli

- Chair – John Owen Williams, "Dedwyddwch"
- Crown – Lewis William Lewis

=== New books ===
==== English language ====
- Henry Jones – A Critical Account of the Philosophy of Lotze
- Arthur Machen – The Three Impostors
- William Retlaw Williams – The parliamentary history of the principality of Wales

==== Welsh language ====
- Daniel Owen – Straeon y Pentan

=== Music ===
- John Thomas Rees – String quartet

== Sport ==
- Golf – The Welsh Golfing Union is founded, and the first Welsh amateur golf championships are held.
- Horse racing – 15 April: The Welsh Grand National steeplechase is run for the first time, at Ely Racecourse, Cardiff. A huge crowd breaks down barriers and almost overwhelms police trying to keep out gatecrashers. Deerstalker is the winner but the horse Barmecide breaks its neck.

== Births ==
- 22 January – Iorwerth Thomas, politician (died 1966)
- 25 January – Mary Glynne, actress (died 1954)
- 8 February – Edward Enoch Jenkins, judge (died 1960)
- 19 February – Mary Dilys Glynne, plant pathologist and mountaineer (died 1991)
- 23 February – Wilfred Mitford Davies, artist (died 1966)
- 1 March – William Richard Williams, civil servant (died 1963)
- 11 March – Albert Jenkins, rugby player (died 1953)
- 3 April – Brinley Williams, Wales dual-code rugby international (died 1987)
- 4 April – Nan Braunton, actress (died 1978)
- 14 April – Albert Evans-Jones ("Cynan"), poet and Archdruid (died 1970)
- 17 April – Thomas Hughes, clergyman, assistant Bishop of Llandaff (died 1981)
- 18 May – Tom Rees, airman, victim of the "Red Baron" (died 1916)
- 8 June – Idwal Jones, humorous writer (died 1937)
- 16 June – David Cuthbert Thomas, soldier who inspired works by both Siegfried Sassoon and Robert Graves (died 1916)
- 24 July – Robert Graves, Royal Welch Fusiliers officer, poet, novelist and classicist often resident in Wales (died 1985)
- 25 July – Sir Ifan ab Owen Edwards (died 1970)
- 14 September – George Harrison, Glamorgan cricketer (date of death unknown)
- 1 November – David Jones, poet and artist (died 1974)
- 24 November – William Evans, cardiologist (died 1988)

== Deaths ==
- 8 January – Daniel Harper, academic, 73
- 15 January – Lady Charlotte Guest, translator of the Mabinogion, 82
- 16 February – Thomas Briscoe, academic, 81
- 18 February – James Goronwy Mathias, minister and writer, 53
- 25 February – Henry Bruce, 1st Baron Aberdare, politician, 79
- 2 April – Ellis Thomas Davies, minister and author, 73
- 3 May – George Herbert, 13th Earl of Pembroke, 44
- 8 May – Thomas Jones (Tudno), poet, 51
- 13 July – John Griffin, Welsh international rugby player, 35
- 18 August – John Arthur Edward Herbert, High Sheriff of Monmouthshire 1849, 76
- 28 August – Henry Pochin, English industrial chemist, mine-owner and politician, founder of Bodnant Garden, 71
- 22 October – Daniel Owen, novelist, 59
- 23 November – William Davies (Pembrokeshire MP), 74
- date unknown – David Lewis, Newmanite priest and academic (born 1814)

== See also ==
- 1895 in Ireland
