= 1812 in Wales =

- Centuries: 17th; 18th; 19th; 20th; 21st
- Decades: 1790s; 1800s; 1810s; 1820s; 1830s
- See also: List of years in Wales; Timeline of Welsh history 1812 in The United Kingdom Scotland Elsewhere

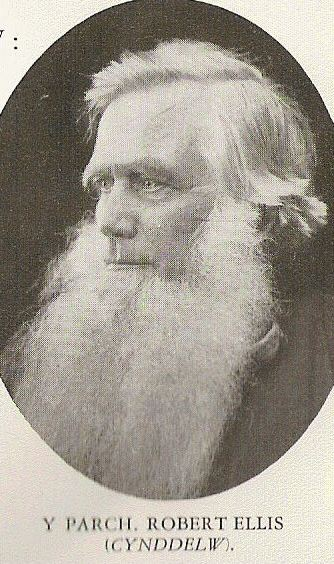
Welsh-language poet, editor and lexicographer Robert Elis ("Cynddelw") (1812-1875).

This article is about the particular significance of the year 1812 to Wales and its people.

== Incumbents ==
- Lord Lieutenant of Anglesey – Henry Paget, Earl of Uxbridge (until 13 March); Henry Paget, 1st Marquess of Anglesey (from 28 April)
- Lord Lieutenant of Brecknockshire and Monmouthshire – Henry Somerset, 6th Duke of Beaufort
- Lord Lieutenant of Caernarvonshire – Thomas Bulkeley, 7th Viscount Bulkeley
- Lord Lieutenant of Cardiganshire – Thomas Johnes
- Lord Lieutenant of Carmarthenshire – George Rice, 3rd Baron Dynevor
- Lord Lieutenant of Denbighshire – Sir Watkin Williams-Wynn, 5th Baronet
- Lord Lieutenant of Flintshire – Robert Grosvenor, 1st Marquess of Westminster
- Lord Lieutenant of Glamorgan – John Stuart, 1st Marquess of Bute
- Lord Lieutenant of Merionethshire - Sir Watkin Williams-Wynn, 5th Baronet
- Lord Lieutenant of Montgomeryshire – Edward Clive, 1st Earl of Powis
- Lord Lieutenant of Pembrokeshire – Richard Philipps, 1st Baron Milford
- Lord Lieutenant of Radnorshire – George Rodney, 3rd Baron Rodney
- Bishop of Bangor – Henry Majendie
- Bishop of Llandaff – Richard Watson
- Bishop of St Asaph – William Cleaver
- Bishop of St Davids – Thomas Burgess

== Events ==
- 20 June - Creation of The Kidwelly and Llanelli Canal and Tramroad Company.
- Summer - Percy Bysshe Shelley stays at Nantgwyllt in the Elan Valley with his wife Harriet.
- September - Rioting occurs at Nefyn over enclosures.
- 17 September - The celebration of the completion of the embankment, later known as the 'Cob' in Porthmadog
- 30 December - A brig, the Fortune, is wrecked on The Smalls, Pembrokeshire, with the loss of 10 or 11 lives.
- 1 October - Balloonist James Sadler flies over the north Wales coastline in an unsuccessful attempt to cross the Irish Sea.
- Opening of:
  - Monmouthshire and Brecon Canal between Newport and Brecon.
  - Aberdare branch of Glamorganshire Canal.

== Arts and literature ==
=== New books ===
==== English language ====
- Felicia Hemans - The Domestic Affections and Other Poems
- Benjamin Millingchamp - A Sermon preached at St. Peter's Church, Carmarthen, on Thursday, July 4, 1811
- The New Flora Britannica (with illustrations by Sydenham Teak Edwards)

==== Welsh language ====
- Lewis Hopkin - Y Fêl Gafod
- Hugh Jones - Arwyrain Amaethyddiaeth

=== Music ===
- Owen Dafydd - Ballad of the Brynmorgan Explosion

== Births ==
- 6 January - Catherine Glynne, future wife of William Ewart Gladstone (d. 1900)
- 3 February - Robert Elis (Cynddelw), poet and lexicographer (d. 1875)
- 3 April - Henry Richard, pacifist politician (d. 1888)
- 19 May - Lady Charlotte Guest, translator and philanthropist (d. 1895)

== Deaths ==
- 15 January - Theophilus Jones, historian, 52
- 13 March - Henry Bayly Paget, 1st Earl of Uxbridge, Lord Lieutenant of Anglesey, 77
- May - Thomas Owen, clergyman and translator, 62
- 27 November (bur.) - Jane Cave, poet, c. 58

== See also ==
- 1812 in Ireland
