= 1807 in Wales =

- Centuries: 17th; 18th; 19th; 20th; 21st
- Decades: 1780s; 1790s; 1800s; 1810s; 1820s
- See also: List of years in Wales; Timeline of Welsh history 1807 in The United Kingdom Scotland Elsewhere

This article is about the particular significance of the year 1807 to Wales and its people.

== Incumbents ==
- Lord Lieutenant of Anglesey – Henry Paget
- Lord Lieutenant of Brecknockshire and Monmouthshire – Henry Somerset, 6th Duke of Beaufort
- Lord Lieutenant of Caernarvonshire – Thomas Bulkeley, 7th Viscount Bulkeley
- Lord Lieutenant of Cardiganshire – Thomas Johnes
- Lord Lieutenant of Carmarthenshire – George Rice, 3rd Baron Dynevor
- Lord Lieutenant of Denbighshire – Sir Watkin Williams-Wynn, 5th Baronet
- Lord Lieutenant of Flintshire – Robert Grosvenor, 1st Marquess of Westminster
- Lord Lieutenant of Glamorgan – John Stuart, 1st Marquess of Bute
- Lord Lieutenant of Merionethshire – Sir Watkin Williams-Wynn, 5th Baronet
- Lord Lieutenant of Montgomeryshire – Edward Clive, 1st Earl of Powis
- Lord Lieutenant of Pembrokeshire – Richard Philipps, 1st Baron Milford
- Lord Lieutenant of Radnorshire – George Rodney, 3rd Baron Rodney
- Bishop of Bangor – John Randolph
- Bishop of Llandaff – Richard Watson
- Bishop of St Asaph – William Cleaver
- Bishop of St Davids – Thomas Burgess

== Events ==
- 9 March – Edward Herbert, 2nd Earl of Powis, assumes the name and arms of Herbert only in lieu of those of Clive by Royal licence, in order to inherit the Powis Castle estates of his uncle.
- 25 March – Opening of the world's first fare-paying passenger railway – the horse-drawn Oystermouth Railway between Oystermouth and Mumbles.
- 7 May – The first Welsh language Bible issued by the British and Foreign Bible Society is published.
- 29 September – The world's oldest international football stadium, the Racecourse Ground, opens in Wrexham for horse racing; it will not host football games until 1872.
- December (approximate) – Welsh Wesleyan preachers make their first visit to Brecon.
- unknown dates
  - North Wales Chronicle begins publication in Bangor.
  - Walter Coffin opens the first coal seam at Dinas Rhondda, after purchasing farmland.
  - William Taitt of the Dowlais Company brings a libel action against Samuel Homfray. Damages of £500 are awarded.
  - The red dragon on a green mount is adopted as the Royal Badge of Wales.

== Arts and literature ==
=== New books ===
- Thomas Charles – Hyfforddwr
- Peter Bailey Williams – Trysorfa Gwybodaeth

=== Music ===
- Anthem y Saint... gan Evan Dafydd (collection of hymns)

== Births ==
- 23 May – Samuel Warren, barrister, novelist and MP (died 1877)
- 22 September – Sir Stephen Glynne, 9th Baronet, landowner and politician (died 1874)
- 7 October – Joshua Hughes, Bishop of St Asaph (died 1889)
- date unknown – Sir William Milbourne James, judge (died 1881)
- probable – Levi Gibbon, balladeer (died 1870)

== Deaths ==
- 5 April – Edward Owen, Anglican priest, headmaster and translator, 78?
- 18 July – Thomas Jones, mathematician, 51
- 12 October – Thomas Wynn, 1st Baron Newborough, former MP and Lord Lieutenant of Caernarvonshire, 70/71
- date unknown
  - David Davies, minister and editor of Y Geirgrawn, age unknown
  - Joseph Turner, architect.
- probable – John Lloyd, clergyman and academic, 53?

== See also ==
- 1807 in Ireland
