= William Ambrose =

William Ambrose may refer to:

- William Ambrose (politician) (1832–1908), English judge and politician
- William Ambrose (Emrys) (1813–1873), Welsh language poet and minister of religion
- William Ambrose (Baptist minister) (1832–1878), Welsh Baptist minister and antiquary
