= 1820s in Wales =

- 1810s | 1830s | Other years in Wales
- Other events of the decade

This article is about the particular significance of the decade 1820–1829 to Wales and its people.

== Arts and literature ==
=== New books ===
- John Elias – Golygiad Ysgrythurol ar Gyfiawnhad Pechadur (1821)
- Felicia Hemans – The Forest Sanctuary (1825)
- Thomas Price (Carnhuanawc) – An Essay on the Physiognomy and Physiology of the Present Inhabitants of Britain (1829)
- David Richards (Dafydd Ionawr) – Cywydd y Dilyw (1821)

=== Music ===
- John Ellis – Eliot (hymn tune) (1823)
- Edward Jones – Hen Ganiadau Cymru (1820)
- Peroriaeth Hyfryd (collection of hymns including Caersalem by Robert Edwards) (1827)
- Seren Gomer (collection of hymns including Grongar by John Edwards) (1824)

== Births ==
- 1820
  - 21 May – Sir Thomas Lloyd, 1st Baronet, politician and landowner (d. 1877)
- 1821
  - 24 June – Guillermo Rawson, Argentinian politician (d. 1890)
  - 16 July – John Jones (Mathetes), preacher and writer (d. 1878)
- 1822
  - 2 March – Michael D. Jones, Patagonian settler (d. 1898)
- 1823
  - 8 January – Alfred Russel Wallace, biologist (d. 1913)
  - March – Rowland Williams (Hwfa Môn), poet and archdruid (d. 1905)
  - 23 November – Sir John Evans, archaeologist (d. 1908)
- 1824
  - date unknown – John Basson Humffray, political reformer in Australia (d. 1891)
- 1825
  - 7 June – R. D. Blackmore, novelist (d. 1900)
- 1826
  - 13 January – Henry Matthews, 1st Viscount Llandaff (d. 1913)
  - 1 March – John Thomas, harpist (d. 1913)
  - 8 May – George Osborne Morgan, lawyer (d. 1897)
  - 11 May – David Charles Davies, Nonconformist leader (d. 1891)
- 1827
  - 27 October – Joseph Tudor Hughes (Blegwryd), harp prodigy (d. 1841)
- 1828
  - 30 January – John David Jenkins, philanthropist (d. 1876)
- 1829
  - 27 January – Isaac Roberts, astronomer (d. 1904)

== Deaths ==
- 1820
  - 29 January – King George III of the United Kingdom, Prince of Wales 1751–1760
  - 16 June – Thomas Jones of Denbigh, Methodist preacher and writer (b. 1756)
  - 27 June – William Lort Mansel, bishop and academic (b. 1753)
  - 23 August – John Randles, harpist (b. 1763)
  - 28 August – Henry Mills, musician (b. 1757)
- 1821
  - 2 May – Hester Thrale, diarist (b. 1741)
  - 7 August – Caroline of Brunswick, former Princess of Wales (1795–1820), 53
- 1822
  - 30 March – David Thomas (Dafydd Ddu Eryri), poet (b. 1759)
  - date unknown – Stephen Kemble, actor, brother of Sarah Siddons (b. 1758)
- 1823
  - 26 February – John Philip Kemble, actor, brother of Sarah Siddons (b. 1757)
- 1825
  - 24 February – Thomas Bowdler, editor (b. 1754)
  - 9 June – Abraham Rees, encyclopaedist (b. 1743)
  - 10 August – Joseph Harris (Gomer), Baptist minister, poet and editor (b. 1773)
- 1827
  - date unknown – Helen Maria Williams, novelist and poet (b. c. 1761)
- 1828
  - September – William Madocks, landowner
- 1829
  - 26 January – Benjamin Millingchamp, collector of manuscripts (b. 1756)
  - June – Elizabeth Randles, harpist (b. 1801)
