= Ellis Davies =

Ellis Davies may refer to:

- Ellis Davies (politician) (1871–1939), Welsh politician and lawyer
- Ellis Davies (priest) (1872–1962), Welsh priest and antiquarian
- Ellis Reginald Davies (1929–2009), Welsh footballer
- Ellis Thomas Davies (1822–1895), Welsh Independent minister
