= John Abel =

John Abel may refer to:

- John Abel (carpenter) (1578/79–1675), English carpenter and mason
- John Abel (minister) (1770–1819), Welsh minister
- John Jacob Abel (1857–1938), American pharmacologist
- John Abel (politician) (1939–2019), Australian politician
- Johnny Abel (1947–1995), Canadian politician

== See also ==
- John Abell (1653–after 1724), Scottish musician
- John Abele (born 1937), American businessman
- Jack Abel (1927–1996), American cartoonist
