= Thomas Davids =

Thomas Davids may refer to:

- Thomas William Davids (1816–1884), Welsh nonconformist minister and ecclesiastical historian
- Thomas William Rhys Davids (1843–1922), English scholar of the Pāli language
