= Richard Llwyd =

Welsh poet

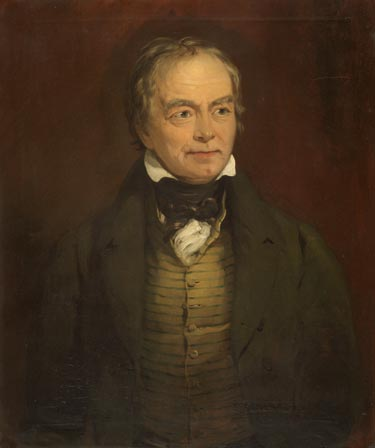
- Richard Llwyd, 'Bard of Snowdon' (1752–1835)
- Born: 1752; Beaumaris, Wales
- Died: 1835 (aged 82–83); Chester, England
- Occupations: writer, genealogists
- Writing career
- Pen name: 'Bard of Snowdon'
- Genre: poetry
- Subject: Welsh culture
- Notable work: Beaumaris Bay

Richard Llwyd, also known as The Bard of Snowdon (1752 – 29 December 1835), was a Welsh author, poet and expert on Welsh heraldry and genealogy. His most notable work is the poem Beaumaris Bay, which was published in 1800.

== Life history ==
Llwyd was born at the King's Head, Beaumaris in 1752 to John and Alice Llwyd. His father was a coast trader who died at Warrington from smallpox while Llwyd was still young. He spent nine months at Beaumaris Free School before entering the service of a local gentleman. As of 1780 Llwyd was a steward and secretary to a Mr. Griffiths of Conwy.

In his later life Llwyd became interested in Welsh books and manuscripts and became an acknowledged expert on Welsh heraldry and genealogy, spending much of his time studying the Hengwrt Manuscripts of Robert Vaughan. His continuing research led him to becoming an acknowledged source to many writers of the time, including Richard Colt Hoare, Peter Roberts and Richard Fenton.

In 1800, Llwyd published his poem "Beaumaris Bay", which was followed by Gayton Wake or Mary Dod (1804) and Poems, Tales, Odes, Sonnets, Translations from the British (1804). On a visit to London in 1808, to study at the British Museum, he was introduced to the likes of Owen Jones and William Owen Pughe, who furthered his reputation as one of the foremost experts in Welsh genealogy.

In 1814, at the age of 62, he married Ann Bingley, daughter of an alderman of Chester, the town where he now lived. In his retirement, Llwyd continued his connection with Welsh culture, being made an honorary member of the Cymmrodorian Society. He also returned to Beaumaris where he was instrumental in raising a monument to David Hughes, the founder of the Free School he studied at as a child. He died in Chester in 1835, having survived his wife by a year. He is buried at St. John's churchyard in Chester.

== Bibliography ==
- Lloyd, John Edward; Jenkins, R.T. (1958). The Dictionary of Welsh Biography, Down to 1940. Cardiff: William Lewis.
