= Anna Laetitia Waring =

Welsh poet and hymn-writer (1823–1910)

- Born: 19 April 1823; Neath, Wales
- Died: 10 May 1910 (aged 87); Bristol, England
- Occupations: Poet and hymn-writer

Anna Letitia Waring (or Anna Laetitia Waring; 19 April 1823 – 10 May 1910) was a Welsh poet and Anglican hymn-writer. Her philanthropic support included the Discharged Prisoners' Aid Society. She brought out her first hymn collection in 1850, but much of her work remained unpublished at the time of her death. A 1911 posthumous edition collected most of this, religious and secular.

== Early life and education ==
Waring was born at Plas-y-Felin, Neath, the third of the seven children of Elijah Waring (1787–1857) and his wife, Deborah. Her family were Quakers, but she was baptised into the Church of England in 1842 at St Martin Church, Winnall, Winchester.

Several members of her family had literary interests. Her uncle, Samuel Miller Waring, published a hymn collection, Sacred melodies (1826). Elijah Waring wrote verse and a literary memoir, Recollections and Anecdotes of Edward Williams, the Bard of Glamorgan (1850). She followed in her family's footsteps as "verse-writing was always a pleasant diversion to her." She learned Hebrew in order to study the Old Testament in the original.

== Career ==
Waring published her first work, Hymns and Meditations, in 1850. It was reprinted and extended many times. Additional Hymns (1858) was integrated into later editions of it and Mary S. Talbot's memoir In Remembrance of Anna Letitia Waring added to its 1911 final edition. The posthumous edition added hitherto unpublished material, secular and religious. Domestic topics appear, including a light-hearted piece on her cat. To Scott it marks a compassionate, reflective personality with a sense of humour. Her well-known hymns include "Father, I know that all my life", "Go not far from me, O my Strength", "In heavenly love abiding" and "My heart is resting, O my God".

Scott sees Waring as typifying a conventional Victorian view of womanhood: pious, reserved, and given to "good works". She became involved in philanthropic work, particularly as a supporter of the Discharged Prisoners' Aid Society. According to a friend, Mary S. Talbot, Waring "visited in the prisons of Bridewell, and at Horfield, Bristol, for many years. To one who spoke to her of the painfulness of such work she answered, 'It is like watching by a filthy gutter to pick out a jewel here and there, as the foul stream flows by.'"

Waring died unmarried at her home in Clifton, Bristol, on 10 May 1910. Her most commonly printed hymn "Father, I know that all my life" was sung at her funeral. Her burial service, at Arnos Vale Cemetery, was led by Canon Talbot, the husband of one of her nieces.

== Selected works ==
- Hymns and Meditations (1850)
- Additional Hymns (1858)
- In Heavenly Love Abiding
- Days of Remembrance: A Memorial Calendar (1886)
