= John James Majendie =

British clergy (1709–1783)

John James Majendie DD (1709–1783) was a Canon of Windsor from 1774 to 1783.

== Life ==
His father, André Majendie, was a Huguenot minister who fled to England after the Edict of Nantes.

He lived at 10 Denmark Street London from 1758 to 1771.

He was appointed:

- Tutor to the Prince of Wales and the Duke of York
- Instructor of Queen Charlotte in the English language
- Vicar of Stoke Prior 1769–1783
- Prebendary of Netheravon in Wiltshire 1752–1783
- Prebendary of the 8th Canonry at Worcester 1769–1774
- to the fifth stall in St George's Chapel, Windsor Castle in 1774 and held the canonry until his death.

He was elected a Fellow of the Royal Society in 1768.

He died at Weston, near Bath in 1783. His son Henry William Majendie became Bishop of Chester and Bishop of Bangor.
