= Odiham Agricultural Society =

The Odiham Agricultural Society was formed in 1783 by a collection of prominent citizens in Odiham, Hampshire, UK, for the purpose of encouraging local industrial and agricultural development. Its aim to advance knowledge in livestock breeding and management led to the establishment in 1791 of Britain's first veterinary college, in London.

== History ==
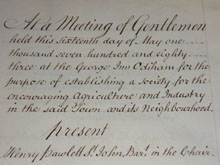
Minutes taken at the establishment of the Odiham Agricultural Society, which went on to play a pivotal role in the establishment of the veterinary profession in England.

On 16 May 1783, the Odiham Agricultural Society was inaugurated as a 'society for the encouraging of Agricultural and Industry in their town and neighbourhood'. The activities and influence of some of its key members was to result in a far more important outcome: the foundation of the veterinary profession in Britain.

The Society had 47 members initially, drawn from 'Gentlemen of Rank, fortune and Ingenuity' plus some 'intelligent farmers'. Amongst those founding members was Thomas Burgess, son of the local grocer, Winchester and Oxford scholar, who became Bishop of St David's, where he founded St David's College, Lampeter before being translated to Salisbury.

Thomas Burgess found an interest in agricultural reform and an affinity with the Odiham Agricultural Society, both for its encouragement to sobriety, Scriptures and Sunday school, and for its focus on new developments. His zeal and his philanthropic nature led him to take up the cause of animal welfare and to campaign for more humane treatment of sick animals. And he started this through the Odiham Agricultural Society.

The minutes of the meeting of 19 August 1785 record Burgess' motion:

"That Farriery is a most useful science and intimately connected with the Interests of Agriculture; that it is in a very imperfect neglected state and highly deserving the attention of all friends of Agricultural economy.

That Farriery, as it is commonly practised, is conducted without principle or science and greatly to the injury to the noblest and most useful of our animals.

That the improvement of Farriery established on a study of the Anatomy, diseases and cure of cattle, particularly Horses, Cows and Sheep, will be an essential benefit to Agriculture and will greatly improve some of the most important branches of national commerce, such as Wool and Leather."

The minutes also record that the meeting resolved:

"That the Society will consult the good of the community in general and of the limits of the Society in particular, by encouraging such means as are likely to promote the study of Farriery upon rational scientific principles."

Unfortunately, neither the Society nor Burgess had the money, medical or scientific knowledge, influence or practical ability to follow through on this resolution, but the quest had begun.

The next step was agreed at the meeting on 17 June 1786 at which it was resolved to set up the Farriery Fund:

"For the breed, management and improvement of horses, cows, sheep and hogs – for the best fully authenticated cures of diseases incident to horses etc, for accurate registers of dairies – for registers of management, profit and loss of a flock of sheep etc"

Another member of the Society now played their part. Arthur Young, an author and traveller, who joined the Society in 1785, spent time in France during 1787 and visited the French veterinary school near Paris. In his 'Travels in France' he wrote that the school had "over one hundred pupils from different parts of France as well as pupils from every country in Europe except England, a strange exception considering how grossly ignorant our farriers are".

The May 1788 meeting of the Odiham Agricultural Society, having heard of this, decided to send 2 or more boys to study at the school in France and advertised for contributions.

In the same year, James Clark, a Scottish farrier wrote a treatise entitled 'Prevention of Disease' in which he put the case for farriery schools "to qualify the farrier for his profession" and praised the work of the French schools, calling for similar in Britain.

At this point another new name is added to the Odiham Agricultural Society, Granville Penn. Penn was a campaigner for enlightened causes and had read James Clark's treatise and heard about the Society's efforts to promote the training of farriery. He became a subscriber to the Farriery Fund and a member of the Society.

In the 5 August 1789 minutes of the Society, under his influence it was resolved that:

"From the information collected on this subject it appears that the improvement of Farriery would be most effectually promoted by the Regular Education in that Art on Medical and Anatomical principles. It is to be lamented that there is not yet in England any Establishment adequate to the desired improvement of Farriery by a regular education in that science."

This was an admission that it was not enough to send a few boys to France, but that a school was required in England.

In October 1789 Penn met a Frenchman named Benoit Vial de St. Bel who was in England finding out about agriculture and thoroughbred horses. He had trained and qualified at the French veterinary school and was also trying, unsuccessfully, to interest the English in establishing a veterinary school in England.

The combined efforts of Penn and St Bel resulted in a plan for an English school and, for the first time, someone who could provide the teaching experience required.

Penn sought out the financial support he needed from wealthy animal owners and also sought moral support from the medical and scientific professions regarding the need to move treatment of animals into the professional sphere. In order to raise money rapidly, he sought large subscriptions from sponsors and patrons, who would become the first governors of a new "College or Body Associating for the purpose of encouraging Veterinary Science" and which would direct the schools.

The plan was sent to the Odiham Agricultural Society who accepted it at their meeting on 5 August 1790. The meeting also appointed a new London Committee of the Odiham Agricultural Society, that included the President, Lord Rivers, and also Burgess and Penn. This committee was to give more detailed supervision to the scheme as Penn believed that the school should be in London.

At the inaugural meeting of the London Committee on 3 November 1790, Burgess had all related resolutions of the parent Odiham Society read out and recorded in detail in the new Minute Book, with the result that these were captured for posterity.

On 18 February 1791, the London Committee resolved to separate itself from the parent Society in Odiham in order to obtain patronage from the Duke of Northumberland, who was unwilling to commit to a subordinate committee. The meeting resolved:

"That from this Day forward they shall be called by the Name of

THE VETERINARY COLLEGE, LONDON.

That Mr Saint Bell be appointed Professor to the College."

This decision was accepted by the Odiham Agricultural Society, who also agreed to give the Farriery Fund to the new London school. Granville Penn went on to progress the plan to completion.

The role of the Odiham Agricultural Society in the foundation of what became the Royal Veterinary Society (in 1844) had ended, and the Odiham Society itself ended a few years later. But its legacy remains today in the Royal College of Veterinary Surgeons.

== Sources ==
The content of this section is sourced from the book 'From Farriery to Veterinary Medicine 1785-1795' by L.P.Pugh, published for RCVS by Heffner, Cambridge in 1962.

- http://www.rvc.ac.uk/AboutUs/Services/Museums/History.cfm
