= John Jenkins (Ifor Ceri) =

John Jenkins (known also as Ifor Ceri) (8 April 1770 – 20 November 1829) was a Welsh priest in the Church of England and an antiquarian. He played a leading role in the establishment of eisteddfodau in Wales in the nineteenth century.

== Life ==
Jenkins, who was born in a farmhouse in Llangoedmor in Ceredigion, Wales, on 8 April 1770, studied at the school in Llangoedmor and Carmarthen Academy before obtaining a Bachelor of Arts degree from the University of Oxford in 1793. He was initially a member of Jesus College, Oxford before transferring to Merton College. He was ordained in 1793 and his first post was at Whippingham, Isle of Wight, where he acted as curate to the rector, who was his uncle. From 1799 onwards, he was chaplain of HMS Agincourt, then of HMS Theseus, in the West Indies. After illness, he returned to Wales to become rector of Manordeifi in Pembrokeshire, before Thomas Burgess (the Bishop of St David's) appointed him as vicar of Ceri in Montgomeryshire in 1807. The name of the village gave him the name by which he was known as an antiquarian, Ifor Ceri. ("Ifor" was after Ifor ap Llywelyn, patron of the medieval Welsh poet Dafydd ap Gwilym – Jenkins was very hospitable towards poets and musicians at his house in Ceri.)

On one visit in 1818, Thomas Burgess and Jenkins decided "to rekindle the bardic skill and ingenuity of the principality ... by holding eisteddfodau in different places in the four provinces". Jenkins carried on directing eisteddfodau until 1829 when he decided that the English influence was too strong. His work paved the way for the National Eisteddfods beginning later in the century. He also collected folk songs, hymn tunes and psalm tunes, and wrote local histories and other articles, some in Welsh. He helped to reform the Honourable Society of Cymmrodorion. Jenkins died in Ceri on 20 November 1829.
