= Erasmus Jones =

Erasmus W. Jones (17 December 1817 – 9 January 1909) was a Welsh-American minister and author.

Jones was born in the parish of Llanddeiniolen, Caerns. Before emigrating to New York in 1833 with his brother, he attended school at Pentir, located near Bangor. Upon his arrival in the United States, he moved between New York City, Trenton, New Jersey, and Remsen, New York. In 1848, he entered the ministry of the Methodist Episcopal Church. Whilst being a part of the Church, he returned to Wales in 1852 to preach. He returned to America to serve as a chaplain in the Army and after went on ministering to numerous churches in Oneida County and several other places until he settled in Utica.

== Works ==
Jones also published several books over a span of 51 years. These included:

- The Higher Law Triumphant: The Captive Youths of Judah (1856)
- The Adopted Son of the Princess (1870, awarded a prize at the Utica 'eisteddfod')
- The Welsh in America (published in The Atlantic Monthly, 1876)
- Llangobaith: A Story of North Wales (1886)
- Gold, Tinsel and Trash (1890)
- The Young Captives: A Story of Judah and Babylon (1907)

== Death ==
Jones died January 9, 1909.
