= Thomas Gruffydd =

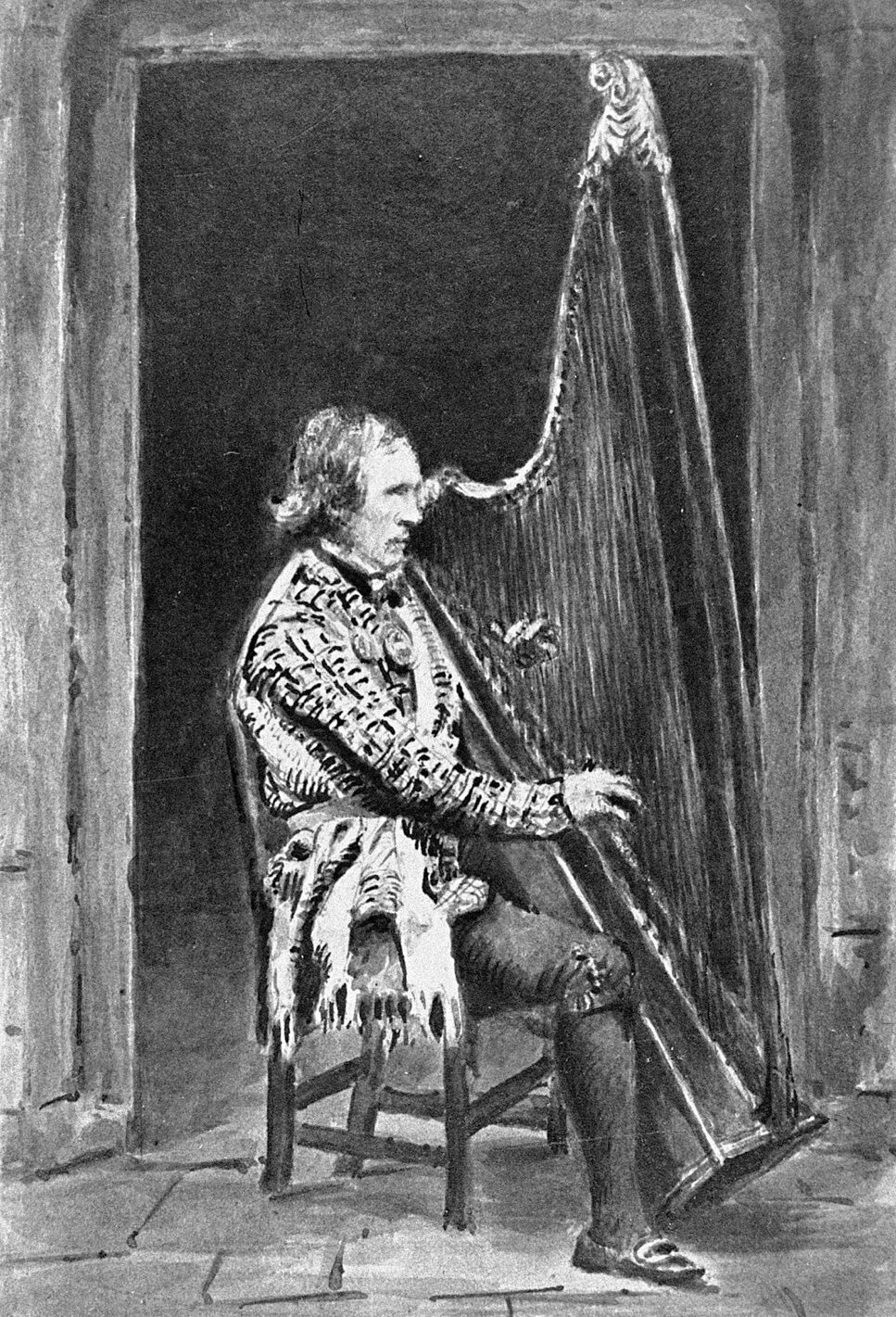

Background information
- Born: 1815; Llangynidr, Wales
- Died: 30 August 1887 (aged 71–72) Llanover, Wales
- Genres: Classical; Harp
- Occupation: Harpist

Thomas Gruffydd (1815 – 30 August 1887) was a Welsh blind harpist. He is widely regarded as one of the most famous harpists of the 19th century.

== Biography ==
Gruffydd was born in Llangynidr of the Powys ward in 1815, and was the grandson of the parish rector. He was one of the most famous harpists of his time.

He was taught by John Wood Jones, and although he lost his sight at a young age, it did not impair his musical talent. He became a harpist for the family of Llanover of Monmouthshire. He was well known for his performances on the harp and his verse singing throughout Monmouthshire and Glamorgan. He won a three-row harp at the Abergavenny Eisteddfod in 1836, and was equal to Richard Mills, Llanidloes, in composing a tone according to the 'traditional oratory' method.

In 1843, he went to play the harp at the Buckingham Palace in London, with his teacher and T. Price ('Carnhuanawc'). Gruffydd also played several times at Marlborough House, London. In 1867, he visited Brittany and stayed with the Comte de la Villemarqué, a man who could speak Welsh fluently. Gruffydd was presented with a ring to celebrate his stay there.

His song "Gwlad y Bard" was published during his life. He died on 30 August 1887 at his home, Tŷ'n-yr-eglwys, and was buried in the churchyard in Llanover.
