= Hugh Bold =

Welsh lawyer (1731–1809)

Hugh Bold (1731–1809) was a Welsh lawyer and was active in the affairs of his borough. His background was humble and he took a post as clerk at the Brecon office of John Philipps, of Tre-gaer near Llanfrynach. Bold later married Philipps' daughter and eventually took over the business. He acted as attorney for several iron-works including the Cyfarthfa works.

He was a well known and respected member of the Methodists, John Wesley wrote of him: ‘I know no attorney to be depended on like him’.

Shortly after the death of his first wife in 1781, he married Dorothy, also a daughter of his previous employer, John Philipps.

Bold died in February 1809.
