= William Ambrose (Baptist minister) =

William Robert Ambrose (9 January 1832 – 21 December 1878) was a Welsh Baptist minister and antiquary. His father was Rev. Robert Ambrose, of Bryncroes, Llŷn Peninsula. William initially trained as a tailor, working in Caernarfon, Liverpool, Bangor, Porthmadog, and Talysarn. Following his baptism in Bangor in 1856 however he began preaching, and in his later years took up a paid position in the ministry in Tal-y-sarn. He was also interested in antiquities, his writings on the subject include the essay 'Hynafiaethau, Cofiannau, a Hanes Presennol Nant Nantlle' ( Pen-y-groes, 1872 ).
