= David Charles Davies =

Welsh minister (1826–1891)

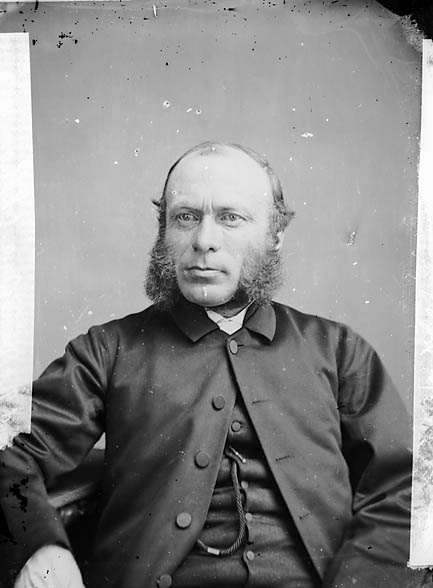
- David Charles Davies in 1864
- Born: 11 May 1826; Aberystwyth
- Died: 26 September 1891 (aged 65)
- Occupation: Nonconformist minister

David Charles Davies (11 May 1826 – 26 September 1891) was a Welsh Nonconformist minister.

== Life ==
He was born at Aberystwyth, his father being a merchant and a pioneer of Welsh Methodism, and his mother a niece of Thomas Charles of Bala. He was educated in his native town by a noted schoolmaster, John Evans, at Bala College, and at University College London, where he graduated B.A. in 1847 and M.A. (in mathematics) in 1849. He had already begun to preach, and after an evangelistic tour in South Wales supplied the pulpit of the English presbyterian church at Newtown for six months, and settled as pastor of the bilingual church at Builth in 1851. He returned to this charge after a pastorate at Liverpool (1853–1856), left it again in 1858 for Newtown, and went in May 1859 to the Welsh church at Jewin Crescent, London. Here he remained until 1876, and from that date till 1882, although living at Bangor for reasons of health, had the chief oversight of the church.

In 1888 he accepted the principalship of the Calvinistic Methodist College at Trefeca in Brecknockshire. His work here was successful, but short; he died at Bangor in 1891, and was buried at Aberystwyth.

Though Davies stood somewhat apart from the main currents of thought both without and within his church, and was largely unknown to English audiences or readers, he exercised a strong influence on Welsh life and thought in the 19th century. He was a serious student, especially of anti-theistic positions, a good speaker, and a frequent contributor to Welsh theological journals. Several of his articles have been collected and published, the most noteworthy being expositions on the First Epistle of John (1889), Ephesians (2 vols., 1896, 1901), Psalms (1897), Romans (1902); and The Atonement and Intercession of Christ (1899, English trans. by D. E. Jenkins, 1901).
