= Mary Pendrill Llewelyn =

Welsh writer and translator

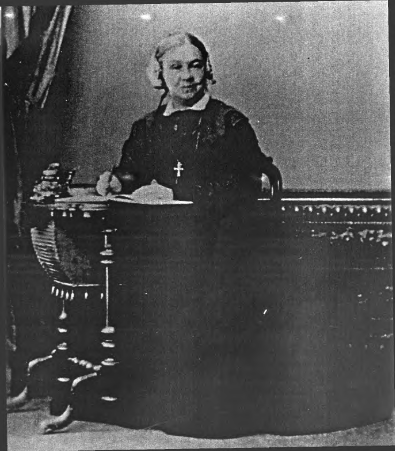
- Born: Mary Catherine Rhys; 12 March 1811; Cowbridge, Wales
- Died: 19 November 1874 (aged 63); Cowbridge, Wales
- Occupations: poet, translator
- Spouse: Rev. R. Pendrill Llewelyn
- Writing career
- Language: English, Welsh

Mary Catherine Pendrill Llewelyn, née Mary Catherine Rhys (12 March 1811 – 19 November 1874) was a Welsh poet and translator.

== Life ==
Mary Catherine Rhys was born on 12 March 1811 in Cowbridge, Glamorgan, to Thomas Rhys, the proprietor of Eagle Academy at Cowbridge, and his wife Joanna. She was educated at home and later attended an academy for young ladies. She married the Reverend Richard Pendrill Llewelyn, who served as vicar of Llangynwyd from 1841 to 1891.

== Works ==
Pendrill Llewelyn was interested in Welsh literature and published her poems in The Cambrian and Merthyr Guardian. She translated a collection of Welsh hymns mainly by William Williams (Pantycelyn) published in 1850. She is also said to have translated a number of Dafydd Nicolas’ ballads.

== Death ==
Pendrill Llewelyn died on 19 November 1874 at the age of 63.

== Works ==
- Richard and Mary Pendrill Llewelyn: a Victorian vicar of Llangynwyd and his wife
