= Edward Pugh (artist) =

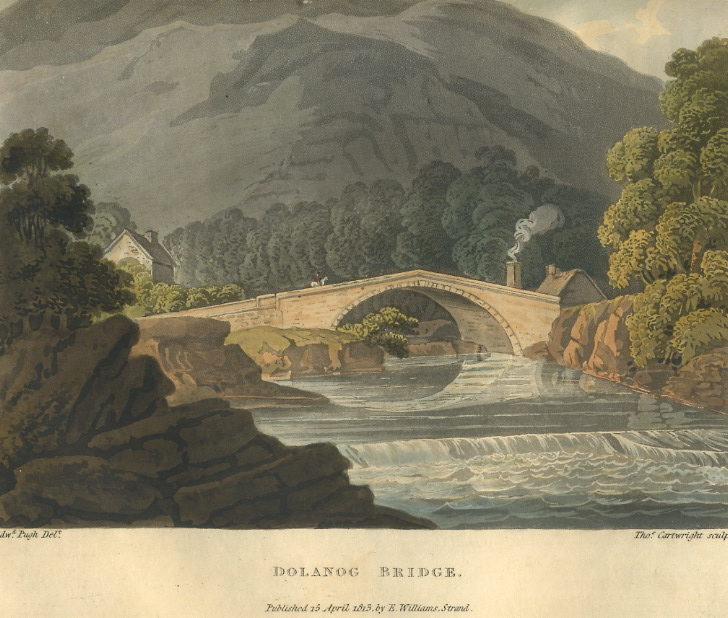
Dolanog Bridge

Edward Pugh (1763–1813) was a Welsh artist known for his landscape paintings of north Wales. He was the subject of a book-length biography by John Barrell in 2013.

His book Cambria Depicta was published posthumously in 1816.
