= George Harrison (Glamorgan cricketer) =

English cricketer

Personal information
- Full name: George Benjamin Harrison
- Born: 14 September 1895; Dalton, Lancashire, England
- Batting: Left-handed

Domestic team information
- Years: Team
- 1924–1925: Glamorgan

Career statistics
Competition	FC
Matches	9
Runs scored	109
Batting average	6.41
100s/50s	–/–
Top score	15
Balls bowled	–
Wickets	–
Bowling average	–
5 wickets in innings	–
10 wickets in match	–
Best bowling	–
Catches/stumpings	3/–
- Source: Cricinfo, 30 June 2010

George Benjamin Harrison (14 September 1895–date of death unknown) was an English cricketer. Harrison was a left-handed batsman. He was born at Dalton, near Skelmersdale, Lancashire.

Harrison made his first-class debut for Glamorgan in 1924 against Gloucestershire. From 1924 to 1925, he represented the county in 9 first-class matches, with his final appearance coming against Northamptonshire. In his 9 first-class matches he scored 109 runs at a batting average of 6.41, with a high score of 34. In the field he took 3 catches.
