= Elijah Waring =

Welsh writer

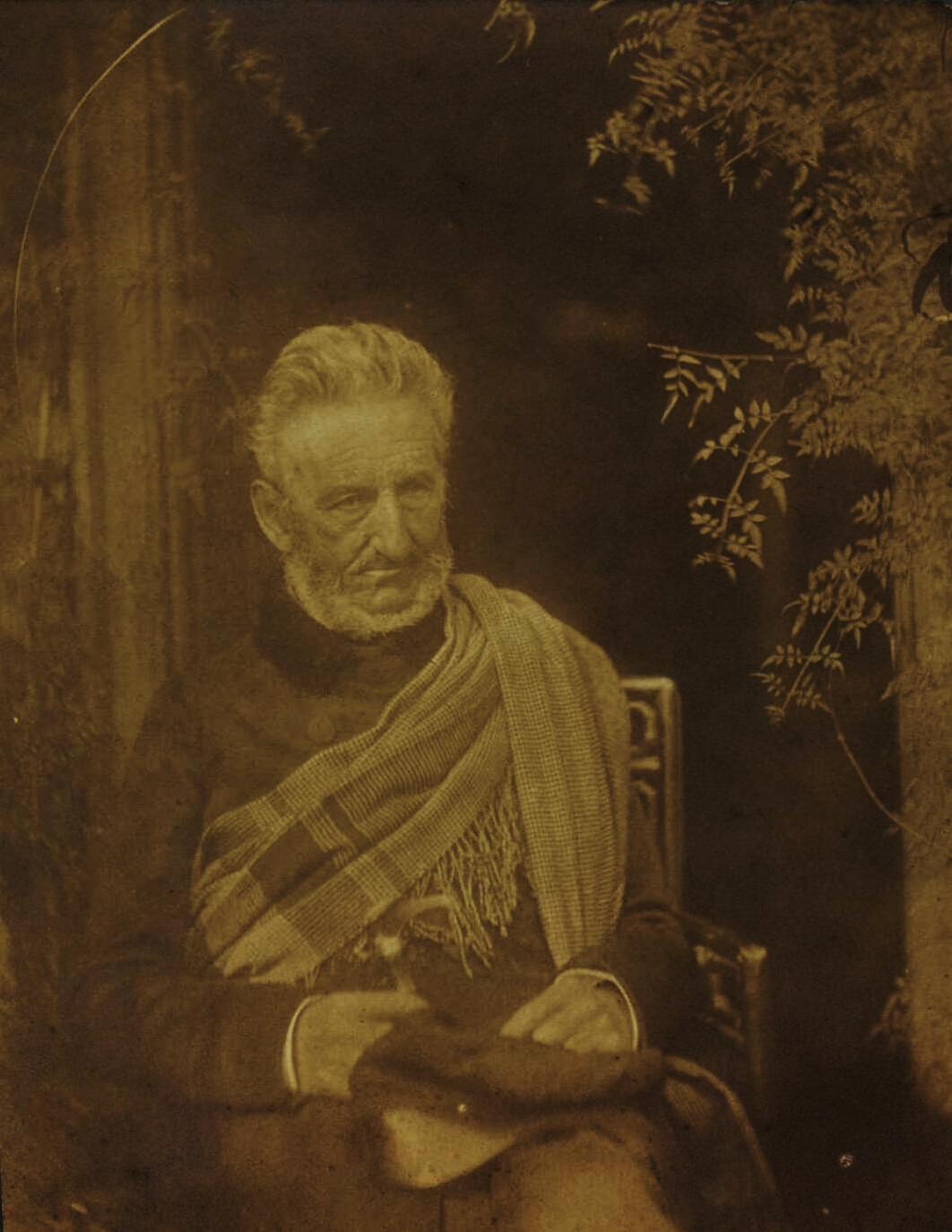
A photograph of Waring taken in 1854

Elijah Waring (14 April 1787 – 29 March 1857) was an Anglo-Welsh writer. He founded an English-language periodical in Swansea.

== Early life ==
Born at Alton, Hampshire, Waring was the son of Quaker parents Jeremiah and Lettice Waring. He settled in South Wales in about 1810.

== Writings and preaching ==
Waring founded an English-language periodical, The Cambrian Visitor: a Monthly Miscellany at Swansea in January 1813, but it had to close in August that year. He moved to Neath in the following year. In 1817, Waring married Deborah Price, sister of the Quaker industrialist Joseph Tregelles Price, in a Quaker ceremony. Waring preached at local chapels and later became a Wesleyan and then a Baptist. He wrote articles for The Cambrian on subjects such as Parliamentary reform, and became friendly with Iolo Morganwg, about whom he later wrote a series of articles. His memoir of Iolo, Recollections and Anecdotes of Edward Williams, the Bard of Glamorgan, was published in 1850.

== Later life ==
In 1835, Waring moved to Cardiff, and afterwards to Clifton near Bristol, but he returned to Neath in 1855 and spent his last years there. His daughter, Anna Laetitia Waring, became well known as a hymn-writer.

== Sources ==
- Welsh Biography Online
