= Edward Edwards (musician) =

Welsh musician and composer

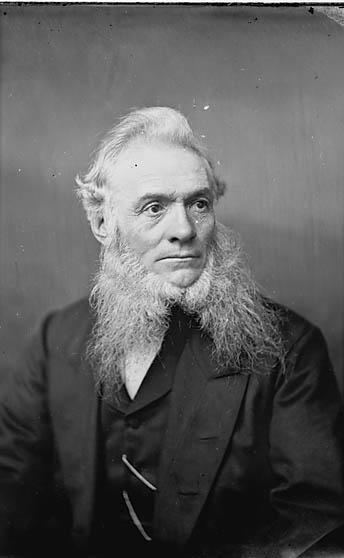
Edward Edwards

Edward Edwards (1816 – 16 September 1897), also known by his bardic name of "Pencerdd Ceredigion", was a Welsh musician and composer.

He was born in Aberystwyth and became a regular churchgoer at Llanbadarn Fawr, joining the choir. When the family moved to Capel Dewi, he was appointed precentor of the local chapel. Later he returned to Aberystwyth, where he worked as a shoemaker. He formed a successful choir at the Tabernacle chapel after returning to Aberystwyth. He died in 1897 and was buried at Aberystwyth.

== Sources ==
- Welsh Biography Online
