= Eliezer Pugh =

British philanthropist (1815–1903)

Eliezer Pugh (28 June 1815 – 8 December 1903) was a Welsh cotton merchant and philanthropist.

Born in Dolgellau, Merionethshire (present day Gwynedd), in north-west Wales, he moved to the seaport of Liverpool, England in 1827 to improve his educational opportunities. He spent the rest of his life by the River Mersey, becoming a very successful cotton merchant and a generous supporter of the Welsh community. Pugh contributed £1,000 annually to religious causes, as well as supporting educational and missionary work.

A committed Christian, he contributed thousands of pounds anonymously to build the Chatham Street Welsh Calvinistic Chapel which today is part of the campus of the University of Liverpool. Together with his wife, Mary (née Mills), they were responsible for the missionary work among the poor at Kent Square.

Eliezer Pugh and his wife bequeathed his home, 16 Falkner Street, to the Presbyterian Church of Wales for the use of the Foreign Mission and the house became the offices of the Director and Staff of the Mission from 1904 to 1969, when the administration was removed to Cardiff.

Pugh was a leader at the Mulberry Street Calvinistic Methodist church and at Chatham Street for 43 years, a total of 46 years dedicated service as an elder of the Presbyterians. He died on 9 December 1903 after a life of service and philanthropy. He was regarded as one of the wealthiest Welsh-speaking Welshmen in the whole of Liverpool.

He died at his home 16 Falkner St. Liverpool and was buried at Toxteth Park Cemetery.
