= Ellis Thomas Davies =

Welsh Independent minister (1822–1895)

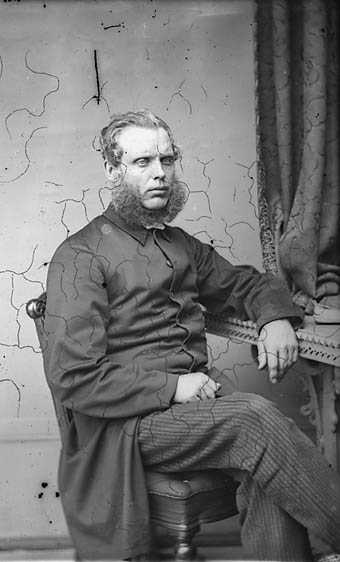
Ellis Thomas Davies

Ellis Thomas Davies (March 1822 – 2 April 1895) was a Welsh Independent minister. He was born at Tymawr, Penant Lliw Bach, and grew up in the Llanuwchllyn area, where his father was an elder in the ‘Old Chapel'. He attended school at Weirglodd Wen, tutored by the local minister, Michael Jones. He then continued his education at Brecon College. He had begun to preach in 1842, and in 1847 began to minister to the churches at Llansantsiôr and Moelfre. After being ordained the following year, he was appointed to the church at Abergele, where he remained for the rest of his ministry, retiring in 1887. He died in 1895.

His written works include a translation of G. B. Johnson's Statement of Principles (1877), and a book of verse.
