= William Ambrose (Emrys) =

Welsh poet and preacher (1813–1873)

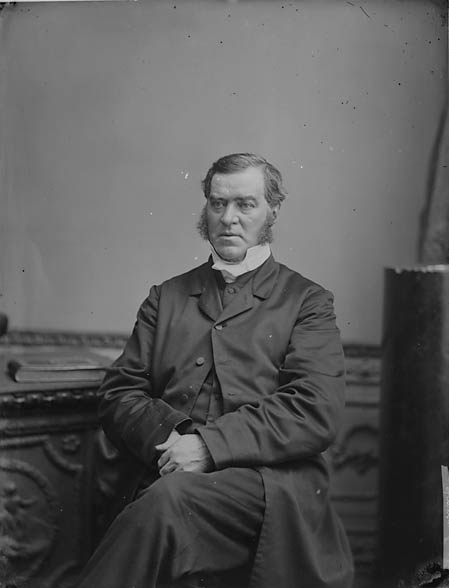
William Ambrose

William Ambrose (1 August 1813 – 31 October 1873), whose bardic name was Emrys, was a 19th-century Welsh-language poet and preacher. Many sermons of his were published and some of his poems used as hymns.

== Ordination ==
Ambrose was born at a Bangor inn, the Penrhyn Arms, in Caernarfonshire (now in Gwynedd), north Wales. His father, John, was a leading member of the local Baptist community, and his mother, Elizabeth, a founder member of Bethel Chapel in Bangor. They remained at the Penrhyn Arms for ten years up to 1823. John Ambrose was also tenant of the local shop. William's cousin was the composer John Ambrose Lloyd. William Ambrose was taught at Holyhead by the Rev. W. Griffiths.

After school, Ambrose was apprenticed to a draper in Liverpool, where he became a member of the Tabernacle Congregational Church, at which his cousin John became precentor. He later moved to London.

However, having gone on a preaching tour led by William Williams (Caledfryn), Ambrose decided against setting up in business in Liverpool and instead become a minister. He was ordained on 7 December 1837. He remained minister of the Independent chapel at Porthmadog until his death, aged 60.

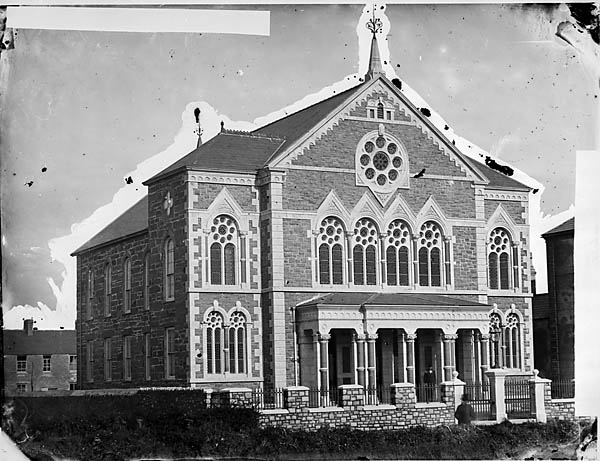
Ambrose memorial chapel, Porthmadog, c.1875

== Writing ==
Emrys edited the periodical Y Dysgedydd from 1853 to 1873 and narrowly missed the bardic chair at the Aberffraw Eisteddfod of 1849, with his "Awdl ar y greadigaeth".

Ambrose is not regarded as an outstanding poet, but many of his sermons were published and he was a popular preacher. Some poems, such as "Ar y Lan Arall" ("On the Other Shore"), became hymns.

== Legacy ==
- In 1875, an elegy to Emrys by John Owen Griffith (Ioan Arfon) won first prize at the National Eisteddfod of Wales in Pwllheli.

== Works ==
- Atgofion fy Ngweinidogaith (1876)
- Gweithiau y Parch (1975)
