= John Abel (minister) =

John Abel (1770–1819) of Carmarthenshire was a Welsh Independent minister and schoolmaster. He was born in Llanybri. Abel attended Carmarthen College and was ordained in 1794 in Capel Sul, Kidwelly, where he remained for a quarter century. Capel Sul was built as a Presbyterian church in 1785, and then became Independent. Abel was the church's second minister. During the week, he was a schoolmaster, after which he preached at the church. His father, co-founder of Capel Newydd in Llanybri, was William Abel.
