= Thomas Briscoe =

Welsh priest and scholar (1813–1895)

Thomas Briscoe (30 June 1813 – 16 February 1895) was a Welsh priest and scholar, who was a Fellow of Jesus College, Oxford for 25 years and Vicar of Holyhead for 37 years. He also translated the New Testament, and some books of the Old Testament, into Welsh.

== Life ==
Briscoe was born in Wrexham, Wales and educated at Ruthin School. He then studied at Jesus College, Oxford, gaining a first class Bachelor of Arts degree in Literae Humaniores in 1833. He gained his Master of Arts degree in 1836, the year that he was ordained deacon. He was ordained priest in 1837 and became curate of Henllan, Denbighshire, holding this post until 1840. In 1843, he was awarded a Bachelor of Divinity degree by the University of Oxford, obtaining his doctorate in 1868.

He was appointed to a fellowship at Jesus College in 1834, holding this until 1859. He served as college tutor from 1835 to 1839 and again from 1843 to 1857; he was also vice-principal from 1849 to 1858. In 1858, he became vicar of Holyhead, remaining vicar until his death on 16 February 1895. He was also chancellor of Bangor Cathedral from 1877, and his library was presented to the cathedral after his death.

Briscoe's scholastic interests encompassed ancient and modern languages, particularly Welsh. He translated a theological work by Ellendorff from German into Welsh in 1851 and four books of the Old Testament (Isaiah, Job, Psalms and Proverbs) from Hebrew into Welsh between 1853 and 1855. In 1894 he translated the New Testament into Welsh following the English Revised Version of 1881.
