= David Richards (Dafydd Ionawr) =

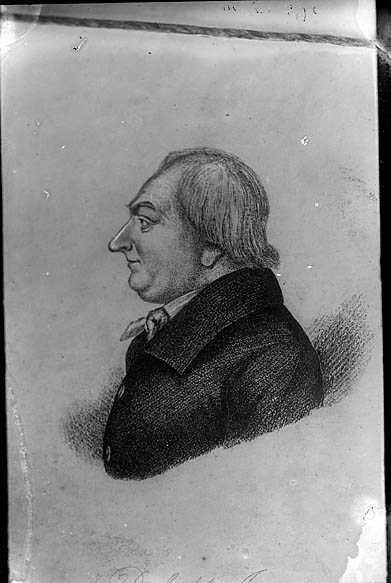
David Richards (Dafydd Ionawr)

David Richards (22 January 1751 – 12 May 1827), better-known by his bardic name Dafydd Ionawr, was a Welsh-language poet, born at Glanyrafon near Bryn-crug in the parish of Tywyn in Merionethshire (now Gwynedd), north-west Wales.

He took an interest in poetry as a result of his acquaintance with Evan Evans (Ieuan Brydydd Hir), who was curate of St Cadfan's Church, Tywyn, and was later sent to a school at Ystradmeurig to obtain a better education than was available locally. After a period as a junior schoolmaster in Wrexham, he spent one term at Jesus College, Oxford, before going to teach at Oswestry grammar school. He then taught at the grammar school in Carmarthen before being appointed head of a free school in his native area. From 1800 to 1807, he taught in Dolgellau, where he remained until his death.

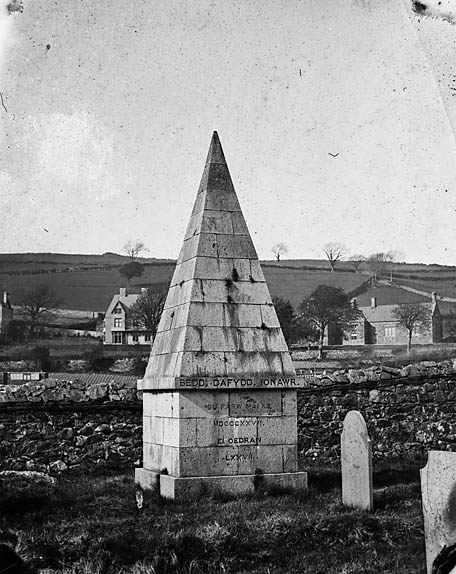
Grave of David Richards, Dolgellau, c.1875

== Works ==
- Cywydd y Drindod (1793)
- Y Mil-Blynyddau (1799)
- Gwaith Prydyddawl (1803)
- Joseph, Llywodraethwr yr Aipht (1809)
- Barddoniaeth Gristianogawl (1815)
- Cywydd y Dilyw (1821)

== Sources ==
- Welsh Biography Online
