= Thomas William Davids =

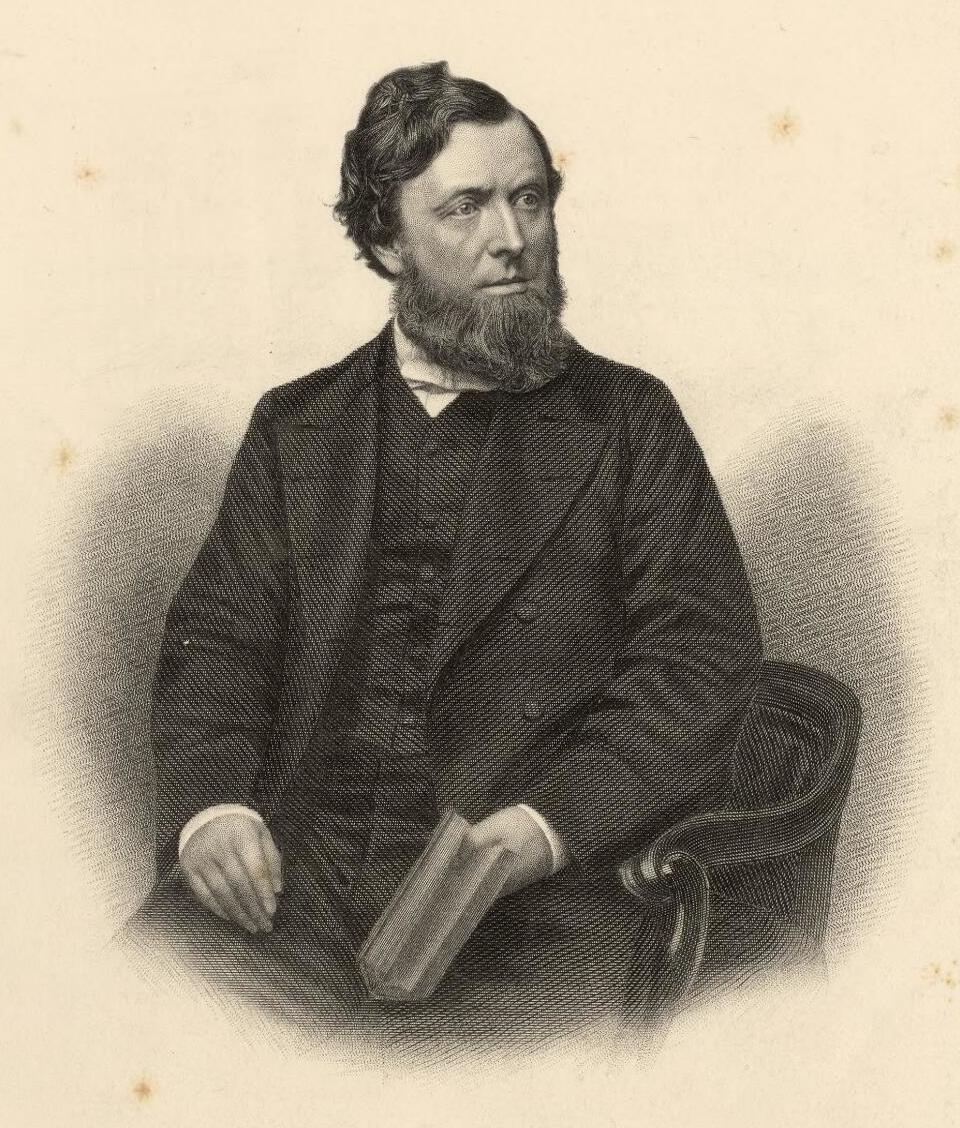
Portrait of Thomas William Davids, Colchester

Thomas William Davids (1816–1884) was a Welsh nonconformist minister and ecclesiastical historian.

== Life ==
Born at Swansea 11 September 1816, he was the only child of William Saunders Davids, pastor of the Congregational church meeting in Providence Chapel, and his wife Bridget, daughter of Thomas Thomas of Vrowen in the parish of Llanboidy, Carmarthenshire. His father died in December 1816, and his mother in 1831; and he was adopted by his uncle Thomas Thomas of Llampeter Velfry, a man of means. For some years he was educated for the medical profession; but in 1835, against his uncle's wishes, he entered Homerton College, then under John Pye Smith, and studied for the ministry.

In 1840 Davids was invited to become minister of the Congregational church meeting in Lion Walk, Colchester in Essex. The congregation outgrew the church, and a new church was built in Lion Walk. Davids became secretary of the Essex Congregational Union, and in 1874 moved to Forest Gate.

Davids was elected an honorary corresponding member of the New England Historic Genealogical Society. He died at Forest Gate of heart disease on 11 April 1884.

== Works ==
For the bicentenary celebration of the Great Ejection in 1662, Davids was asked in 1862 to prepare a memorial of those who were evicted in Essex. He researched manuscript authorities (in Essex parish registers, the Record Office, British Museum, Dr. Williams's Library). Results of his researches appeared as the Annals of Evangelical Nonconformity in the County of Essex from the time of Wycliffe to the Restoration, with Memorials of the Essex Ministers ejected or silenced in 1660–1662 (1863). Six further folio volumes went after his death to the library of the Memorial Hall in Farringdon Street.

Davids then took up the question of "evangelical belief" stretching centuries before the time of John Wycliffe and Jan Huss; but his planned Annals of Reformers before the Reformation was not completed. He published historical articles and reviews, including biographies of heretics in the Dictionary of Christian Biography of William Smith and Wace; and a paper on Evangelical Nonconformity under the first of the Plantagenets (British Quarterly for September 1870).

== Family ==
In 1841 Davids married Louisa (died 1853), daughter of Robert Winter, solicitor, of Clapham Common. The Sunday school attached to his church became well known as a model, and she published in 1847 an essay The Sunday School, which was awarded a prize offered by the Sunday School Union, had four editions, and was for some years regarded as a standard text. They had six children by his first wife. Davids married a second time, on 28 April 1859, Mary, daughter of William Spelman of Norwich; they had no children.

== Notes ==
Attribution

This article incorporates text from a publication now in the public domain: Stephen, Leslie, ed. (1888). "Davids, Thomas William". Dictionary of National Biography. Vol. 14. London: Smith, Elder & Co.
