= Richard Fenton =

Welsh lawyer, topographer and poet

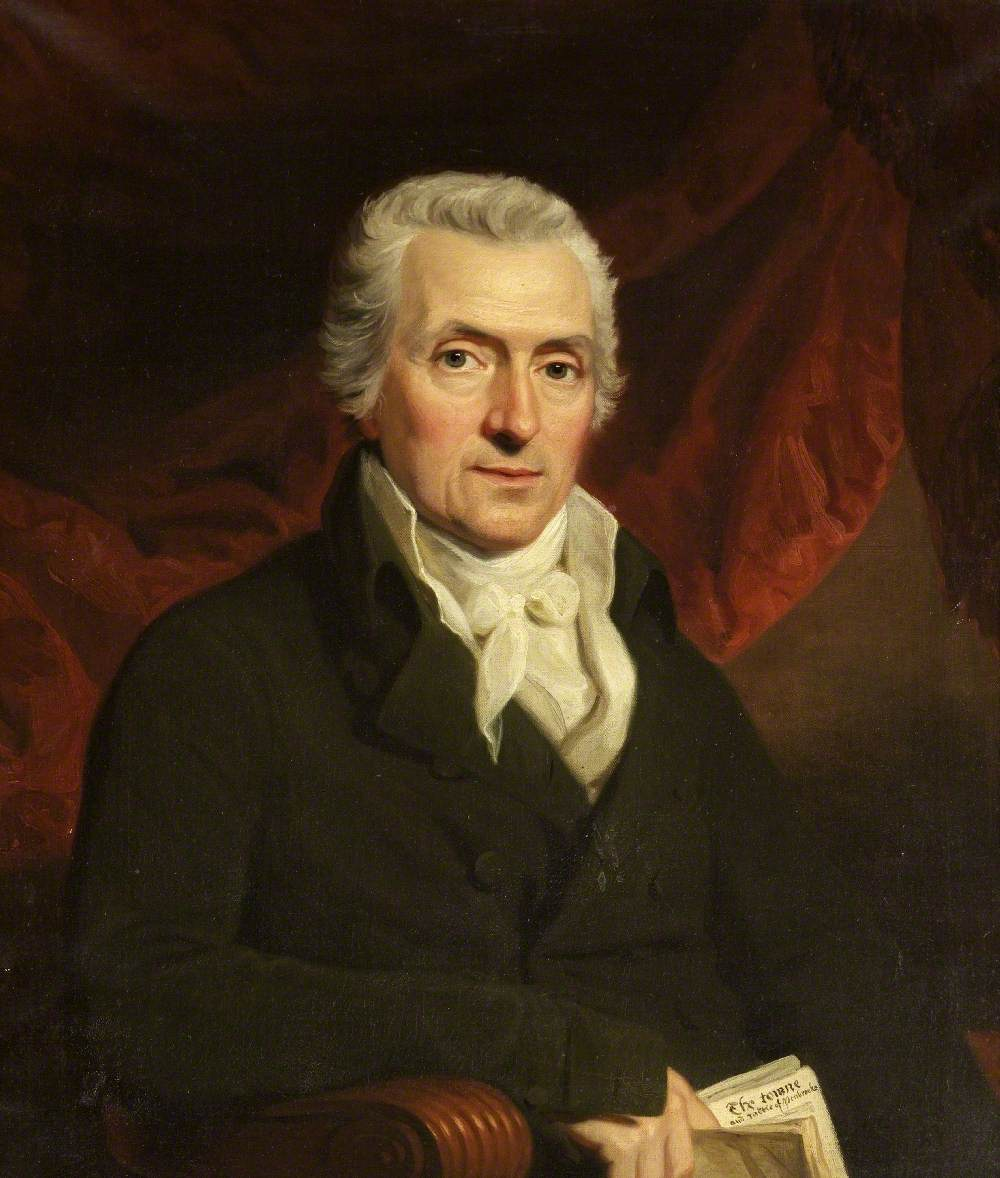
- Born: 1747; St Davids, Pembrokeshire
- Died: 1821 (aged 73–74); Fishguard, Pembrokeshire
- Occupations: lawyer, writer, poet
- Known for: Topography, poetry

Richard Fenton (January 1747 – November 1821) was a Welsh lawyer, topographer and poet.

== Biography ==
Fenton was born in January 1747 in St David's, Pembrokeshire, and was baptised in St David's Cathedral on 20 February 1747, "being then a month old". He was educated at the cathedral school, and at an early age obtained a situation in London in the custom house. Later he entered the Middle Temple, and studied for the legal profession. After being called to the bar he attended the circuits in Wales for several years.

Subsequently he devoted his time to literary pursuits; he was a friend of Oliver Goldsmith and Sir Richard Colt Hoare. He travelled throughout Wales, studying local records and publishing several topographical volumes. After a merchant uncle died, he took over his mercantile fleet. Fenton died at his home at Plas Glynamel, Fishguard, in November 1821, and was buried nearby at Manorowen.

== Works ==
Fenton's works include:

- Poems, London 1773; 2 vols. 1790.
- A Historical Tour through Pembrokeshire, London 1811, with thirty plates and a map. This was the work censured by Thomas Burgess, in his Bishops and benefactors of St. David's vindicated from the misrepresentations of a recent publication, 1812. Fenton's reply to the bishop remained in manuscript. Prefixed is the author's portrait, engraved by Thomas Woolnoth, from a painting by Samuel Woodforde; the original is at Stourhead. The work made use of manuscripts of George Owen Harry.
- A Tour in quest of Genealogy through several parts of Wales, Somersetshire, and Wiltshire in a series of letters … interspersed with a description of Stourhead and Stonehenge … and curious fragments from a manuscript collection, ascribed to Shakespeare. By a Barrister, London 1811.
- Memoirs of an old Wig, London, 1815, (anon.), a humorous work.
- A translation of the Deipnosophistæ of Athenæus; manuscript deposited in the library of Richard Colt Hoare at Stourhead.
- "Cromlech at Llanwnda, Pembrokeshire" in Archaeologia Cambrensis, No 12 (October 1848), at p. 283
- Tours in Wales (1804–1813) (ed. John Fisher), Archaeologia Cambrensis Supplemental Volume, 1917.

Fenton also left comedies in manuscript, and manuscript materials for the history of every county in Wales.

== Family ==
Fenton married Eloise, the daughter of David Pillet, a Swiss military officer.
