= John Luxmoore =

British bishop

John Luxmoore or Luxmore (1766–1830) was an English bishop of three sees.

== Life ==
The son of John Luxmoore of Okehampton, Devon, he was born there. He was educated at Ottery St. Mary school and Eton College, as a scholar in 1775 to King's College, Cambridge. He graduated with a B.A. in 1780 and proceeded to an M.A. in 1783.

On 30 June 1795, he was created D.D. at Lambeth by Archbishop John Moore. He became a fellow of his college, and having been tutor to the Earl of Dalkeith, he obtained preferment. He was rector of St. George the Martyr, Holborn, in 1782, prebendary of Canterbury in 1703, dean of Gloucester in 1799, and Taynton in 1800. In 1806, he exchanged St. George the Martyr, Holborn, for St. Andrew's, Holborn. In 1807, he became bishop of Bristol, in 1808, he was translated as bishop of Hereford, and in 1815, he was translated to the bishop of St Asaph. In 1808, he resigned from the deanery of Gloucester, and in 1816, the benefice of St. Andrew's, Holborn. Luxmoore held, as was usual, the archdeaconry of St Asaph at the same time as the bishopric, and had other preferments. He died at the palace, St Asaph, on 31 January 1830. He published a few charges and sermons.

== Family ==
Luxmoore married a Miss Barnard, niece of Edward Barnard, provost of Eton, and left a large family. The eldest son, Charles Scott Luxmoore, was himself an eminent clergyman
