= William Cleaver =

British bishop

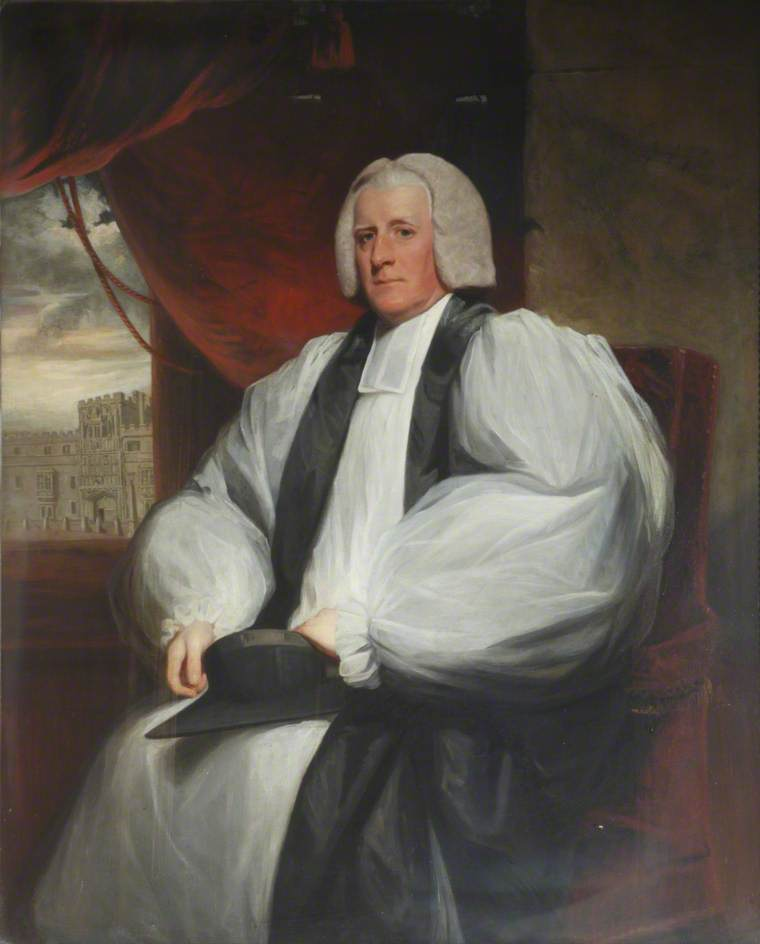
- Bishop Cleaver by John Hoppner
- Born: 1742; Twyford, England
- Died: May 15, 1815 (aged 72–73); Bruton Street, London, England

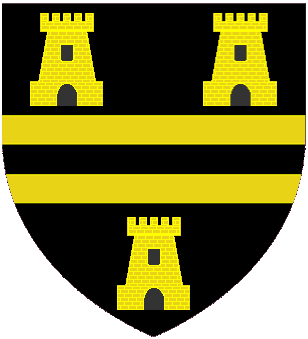
Arms: Sable two bars between three castles masoned Or.

William Cleaver (1742–1815) was an English churchman and academic, Principal of Brasenose College, Oxford, and bishop of three sees.

== Life ==
He was the eldest son of the Rev. William Cleaver, who was the headmaster of a private school at Twyford in Buckinghamshire, and his wife Martha Lettice Lushden. He was the elder brother of Euseby Cleaver, Archbishop of Dublin from 1809 to 1819. He was at Magdalen College, Oxford, and after taking his B.A. degree, in 1761, was a fellow of Brasenose College; he became M.A. on 2 May 1764.

In 1768 he was a candidate for the Bodleian librarianship. The votes between him and his competitor John Price were equal, and the latter was appointed on account of being a few months the senior. Cleaver became tutor to George Nugent-Temple-Grenville. He was successively made vicar of Northop in Flintshire, prebendary of Westminster (1784), Principal of Brasenose College (1785), bishop of Chester (1787), bishop of Bangor (1800), and bishop of St Asaph (1806). He retained the headship of Brasenose until 1809, and almost constantly lived there.

At Bangor in 1802, he cautioned an old servant who let apartments against a stray lodger who the bishop thought might be no better than a swindler. This suspicious personage was Thomas De Quincey, who mentioned the incident in his English Opium-eater. Cleaver died on 15 May 1815 in Bruton Street, London. He was interested in the higher education of women.

== Works ==
Among his writings were De Rhythmo Graecorum, 1775, and Directions to the Clergy of the Diocese of Chester on the Choice of Books, 1789. He also edited the edition of Homer printed at Oxford by the Grenville family.

Academic offices
Preceded by Thomas Barker	Principal of Brasenose College, Oxford; 1785–1809	Succeeded by Frodsham Hodson
Church of England titles
Preceded by Beilby Porteus	Bishop of Chester; 1787–1800	Succeeded by Henry Majendie
Preceded by John Warren	Bishop of Bangor; 1800–1806	Succeeded by John Randolph
Preceded by Samuel Horsley	Bishop of St Asaph; 1806–1815	Succeeded by John Luxmoore
