= Henry Majendie =

British bishop

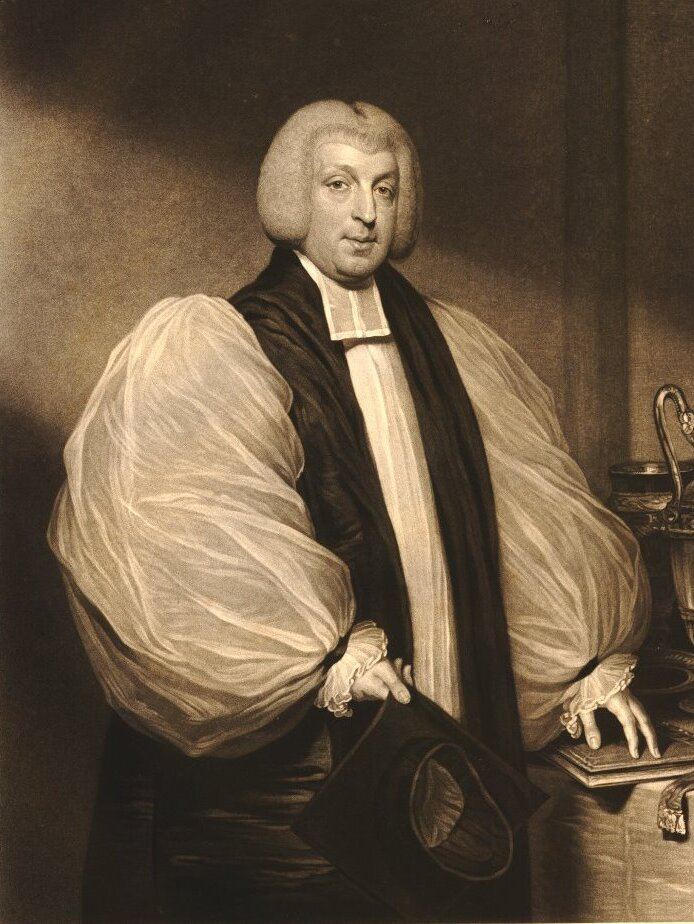
Bishop Majendie

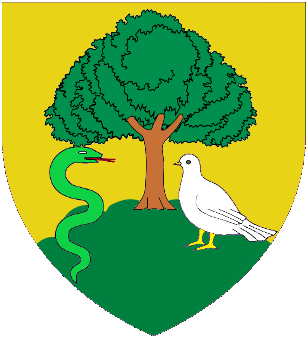
Arms: Or on a mount Vert a tree between a serpent erect and a dove close Proper.

Henry William Majendie (bapt. Henri Guillaume Majendie; 7 October 1754 – 9 July 1830) was an English Bishop of Chester and Bishop of Bangor.

== Life ==
Majendie was born in London to John James Majendie and Elizabeth Prevost. His grandfather André de Majendie was a Huguenot refugee who settled at Exeter. His father was a canon of Windsor and was connected to the court, being an English tutor to Queen Charlotte of England, Charlotte of Mecklenburg-Strelitz.

He was educated at Charterhouse and at Christ's College, Cambridge, where he graduated B.A. in 1776; though he did not have an honours degree, he was made fellow in the same year, in the vacancy caused by the departure of William Paley. One historian, noting his mediocre academic record, thought that his subsequent honours "came rather too easily to him".

In 1779, George III arranged for Majendie to teach and supervise Prince William aboard HMS Prince George; for this position, he formally had the rank of midshipman. In 1781 he was named preceptor of Prince William. William's biographer states that he liked and respected his tutor, but that Majendie's character was not strong enough to have much influence on his pupil.

He was ordained priest in 1783, and became vicar of Bromsgrove, Worcestershire. He was canon of Windsor from 1785 to 1798, becoming vicar of Nether Stowey, Somerset in 1790 and proceeding D.D. in 1791; while in Somerset he befriended Thomas Poole, the supporter of Samuel Taylor Coleridge. He was vicar of Hungerford, Wiltshire from 1793 to 1798, and a canon of St. Paul Cathedral from 1798. He was bishop of Chester from 1800, and then of Bangor, from 1809. He died on 9 July 1830, at the house of his son the Revd Stuart Majendie, at Longdon near Lichfield.

On 11 April 1785, he married Anne Routledge (d. 1836) of Stapleton, Cumberland; they had thirteen children. His son Edward died at Christ Church, Oxford in 1825 from the bursting of a blood vessel from overreading. A daughter Katherine married Henry Fynes Clinton, MP, and another, Louisa married Sir George Henry Hewett, 2nd Baronet. His grandson was Colonel Sir Vivian Dering Majendie KCB, RA, Chief Inspector of Explosives from 1871 to 1898.

Church of England titles
Preceded by William Cleaver	Bishop of Chester; 1800–1809	Succeeded by Bowyer Sparke
Preceded by John Randolph	Bishop of Bangor; 1809–1830	Succeeded by Christopher Bethell
