= George Rodney, 3rd Baron Rodney =

British peer

George Rodney, 3rd Baron Rodney (18 June 1782 – 21 June 1842), was a British peer.

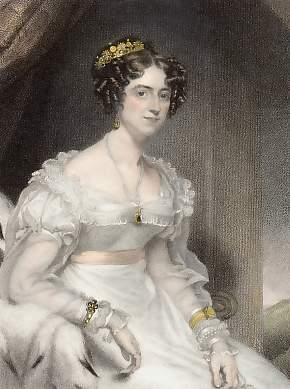
Lady Rodney, 1826 engraving

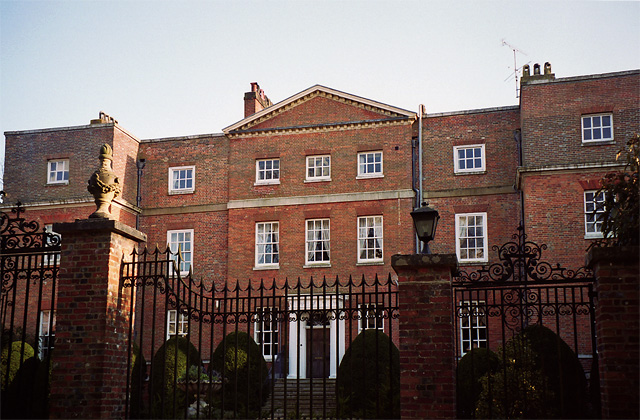
Old Alresford House

Rodney was the eldest son of George Rodney, 2nd Baron Rodney, by Anne Harley, daughter and heiress of Thomas Harley. He succeeded his father in the barony in 1802, aged 19, inheriting Old Alresford House.

In 1804 he was appointed Lord-Lieutenant of Radnorshire (succeeding his grandfather Thomas Harley), a post he held until his death in 1842.

He was commissioned as a Captain in the Herefordshire Militia on 1 July 1804 and then in 1811 he was appointed Colonel of the North Hampshire Militia, a position he held until he resigned in 1841.

Lord Rodney married Charlotte Georgiana Gould-Morgan, daughter of Sir Charles Morgan, 2nd Baronet, in 1819. There were no children from the marriage. He died in June 1842, three days after his 60th birthday, and was buried at Old Alresford, Hampshire. His younger brother Thomas succeeded in the barony. Lady Rodney died in February 1878.

Honorary titles
Preceded by Thomas Harley	Lord-Lieutenant of Radnorshire; 1804–1842	Succeeded by Sir John Walsh, Bt
Peerage of Great Britain
Preceded by George Rodney	Baron Rodney; 1802–1842	Succeeded by Thomas James Harley-Rodney
