= Thomas Burgess (bishop of Salisbury) =

English Anglican bishop (1756–1837)

The Right Reverend Thomas Burgess
- Bishop of St Davids, Bishop of Salisbury
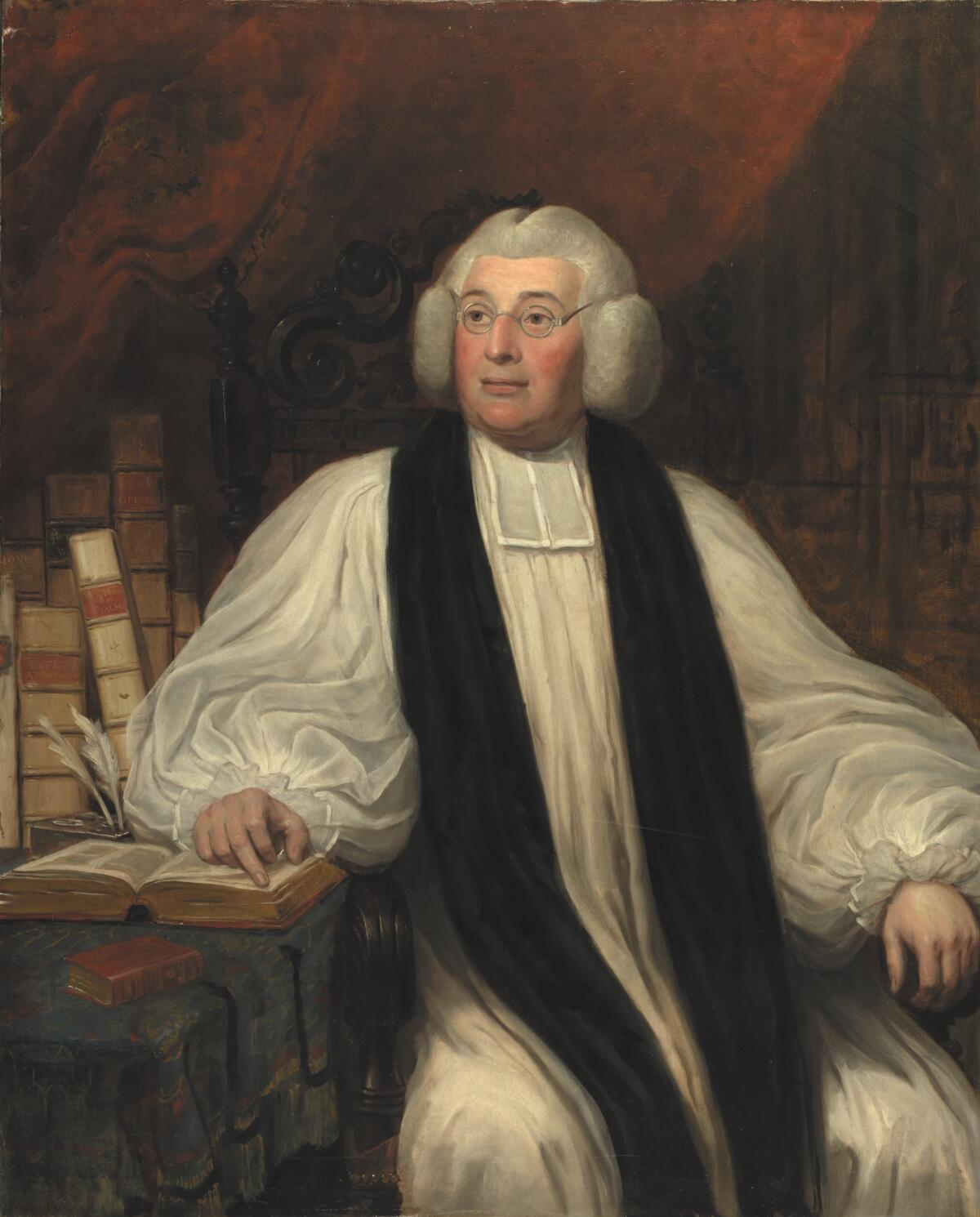
- Church: Church of England
- Diocese: Diocese of St Davids, Diocese of Salisbury
- Installed: 1803 Bishop of St Davids, 1825 Bishop of Salisbury
- Predecessor: John Fisher
- Successor: Edward Denison

Personal details
- Born: 18 November 1756 Odiham, Hampshire, England
- Died: 19 February 1837 (aged 80) Southampton, Hampshire, England
- Denomination: Anglican
- Education: Corpus Christi College, Oxford

Thomas Burgess (18 November 1756 – 19 February 1837) was an English author, philosopher, Bishop of St Davids and Bishop of Salisbury, who was greatly influential in the development of the Church in Wales. He founded St David's College, Lampeter, was a founding member of the Odiham Agricultural Society, helped establish the Royal Veterinary College in London, and was the first president of the Royal Society of Literature.

== Life ==
Thomas Burgess was born at Odiham in Hampshire, youngest son of William Burgess and his wife Elizabeth née Harding, grocers. He was educated at Robert May's School in Odiham, at Winchester College, and at Corpus Christi College, Oxford (Scholar 1775, B.A. 1778, M.A. 1782). He was a precocious scholar. Before graduating, he edited a reprint of John Burton's Pentalogia, and in 1781 he brought out an annotated edition of Richard Dawes's Miscellanea Critica (reprinted, Leipzig, 1800). In 1783 he became a fellow of his college, and in 1784 he was ordained deacon and priest. In 1785 Burgess was appointed examining and domestic chaplain to Shute Barrington, bishop of Salisbury. In that capacity Burgess wrote The Salisbury Spelling Book, an introductory manual for teaching reading and writing, which became highly popular in Sunday school classes throughout the country. The first edition (1785) was followed rapidly by further editions. From 1787 to 1803 he held the prebend of Wilsford and Woodford in Salisbury cathedral, resigning on his appointment as bishop of St Davids. In 1788 Burgess published his Considerations on the Abolition of Slavery, in which he advocated the principle of gradual emancipation.

When Barrington was appointed bishop of Durham in 1791, Burgess moved to Durham with Barrington. From 1791 until 1825 he held a prebendal stall at Durham, holding in turn the 9th (1791–1792), 6th (1792–1820) and 2nd (1820–1825) stalls. At Durham he carried out evangelistic work among the poorer classes. A pen portrait of the Durham prebendaries in 1831 describes Burgess as "silent in company, learned and intelligible in the pulpit; addressing the understanding in sound and classical language, informing the ignorant as the sun dispels the darkness of night".

In June 1803, his old friend Henry Addington, then prime minister, appointed Burgess bishop of St Davids, by far the largest of the Welsh sees. He held the see for over twenty years, retaining his prebendal stall in Durham. Burgess was "the first Welsh bishop for generations to devote himself to his duties... [He] was enthusiastically in favour of clergy who could preach in Welsh ... [and] equally enthusiastically in favour of giving church patronage to Welsh cultural activities." In 1804 a Welsh translation of a catechism written by Burgess was published at Carmarthen. He refused to induct clergy ignorant of Welsh into Welsh-speaking parishes. To educate Welsh clergy for the diocese, Burgess founded and endowed St David's College, Lampeter (now the Lampeter campus of the University of Wales Trinity Saint David). After nearly twenty years of preparation, the foundation stone for the college was laid in 1822; students were first admitted on St David's Day 1827. Burgess also established the Society for Promoting Christian Knowledge in the diocese and was a prime mover in the creation of the Cambrian Societies, organisers of the provincial eisteddfodau. "He devoted himself with such zeal to the reformation of his diocese as to make a deep mark on the history of the Welsh church".

In 1825 Burgess was translated Bishop of Salisbury, resigning his stall in Durham. He was the last Bishop of Salisbury to be ex officio Chancellor of the Order of the Garter. Both at Salisbury and at St Davids, Burgess founded a Church Union Society for the assistance of infirm and distressed clergymen. Burgess opposed both Unitarianism and Catholic Emancipation. The latter policy led to several clashes with the Government; the Duke of Wellington told him sharply that he would do far more to strengthen the Protestant faith by staying in his diocese and minding his flock than he could by bombarding the Government with political pamphlets.

Thomas Burgess was a founding member of the Odiham Agricultural Society in 1783 and played a leading role in establishing the Royal Veterinary College in order to contribute to improved education in the treatment of sick animals. He was elected a Fellow of the Royal Society in 1807. In 1820 he was appointed first president of the recently founded Royal Society of Literature.

On 1 October 1799, Burgess married Margery, daughter of John Bright of Pontefract in Yorkshire; the marriage was without children. He died on 19 February 1837 at Southampton, and was buried in Salisbury Cathedral on 27 February. His monument is sculpted by William Osmond. His widow died in 1842.

Burgess saw the creation of St David's College Lampeter as his great work: he left the college at his death his personal library of some 9,000 volumes, a working collection gathered during a lifetime devoted to the study of classics, literature, history, antiquities, and theology. His library remains at Lampeter, now as a special collection of the University of Wales Trinity St Davids; his many annotations offer an insight into Burgess's scholarly and theological preoccupations.

== Works ==
A list of his works, which are very numerous, will be found in his biography by John Scandrett Harford (2nd ed, 1841). In addition to those already referred to may be mentioned his Essay on the Study of Antiquities; First Principles of Christian Knowledge; Reflections on the Controversial Writings of Dr. Priestley; Emendationes in Suidam et Hesychium, et alios Lexicographos Graecos; The Bible, and nothing but the Bible, the Religion of the Church of England.

== Notes ==
Church of England titles
| Preceded by Lord George Murray | Bishop of St Davids; 1803–1825 | Succeeded by John Jenkinson |
| Preceded by John Fisher | Bishop of Salisbury; 1825–1837 | Succeeded by Edward Denison |
