= 1803 in Wales =

- Centuries: 17th; 18th; 19th; 20th; 21st
- Decades: 1780s; 1790s; 1800s; 1810s; 1820s
- See also: List of years in Wales; Timeline of Welsh history 1803 in The United Kingdom Scotland Elsewhere

This article is about the particular significance of the year 1803 to Wales and its people.

== Incumbents ==
- Lord Lieutenant of Anglesey – Henry Paget
- Lord Lieutenant of Brecknockshire and Monmouthshire – Henry Somerset, 5th Duke of Beaufort (until 11 October); Henry Somerset, 6th Duke of Beaufort (from 4 November)
- Lord Lieutenant of Caernarvonshire – Thomas Bulkeley, 7th Viscount Bulkeley
- Lord Lieutenant of Cardiganshire – Thomas Johnes
- Lord Lieutenant of Carmarthenshire – John Vaughan
- Lord Lieutenant of Denbighshire – Sir Watkin Williams-Wynn, 5th Baronet
- Lord Lieutenant of Flintshire – Robert Grosvenor, 1st Marquess of Westminster
- Lord Lieutenant of Glamorgan – John Stuart, 1st Marquess of Bute
- Lord Lieutenant of Merionethshire - Sir Watkin Williams-Wynn, 5th Baronet
- Lord Lieutenant of Montgomeryshire – vacant until 1804
- Lord Lieutenant of Pembrokeshire – Richard Philipps, 1st Baron Milford
- Lord Lieutenant of Radnorshire – Thomas Harley
- Bishop of Bangor – William Cleaver
- Bishop of Llandaff – Richard Watson
- Bishop of St Asaph – Lewis Bagot (until 4 June); Samuel Horsley
- Bishop of St Davids – Lord George Murray (until 3 June); Thomas Burgess (from 24 July)

== Events ==
- 26 June - First public assembly of the South Wales Unitarian Association.
- Robert Saunderson of Liverpool settles at Bala and becomes official printer to the Calvinistic Methodist Society, working for Thomas Charles.
- 17 July - Thomas Burgess is consecrated Bishop of St David's.
- September - A new company, the Union Iron World Company, is formed to run Rhymney ironworks, after Benjamin Hall takes it over.
- date unknown
  - Rhys Davies (Y Glun Bren) preaches from the mounting-block in front of the Black Lion Inn at Talybont in Cardiganshire, beginning Independent Methodist activity there.
  - Pascoe Grenfell contracts to trade in copper in the Swansea area.
  - Thomas Johnes sets up a private printing press to publish translations of French medieval chronicles.
  - Dunraven Castle is built, near Southerndown.
  - Benjamin Heath Malkin begins his travels in South Wales.
  - Paeonia mascula is discovered growing on the island of Steep Holm - the only species of peony native to the British Isles.

== Arts and literature ==
=== New books ===
- J. T. Barber - A Tour Throughout South Wales and Monmouthshire
- Robert Davies (Bardd Nantglyn) - Barddoniaeth
- William Owen Pughe - Geiriadur Cymraeg-Saesneg

== Births ==
- 10 May - Christopher Rice Mansel Talbot, landowner, industrialist and politician, owner of Margam Castle (died 1890)
- 29 June - Peter Maurice, priest and writer (died 1878)
- 15 September - Charles Octavius Swinnerton Morgan, politician, historian and antiquary (died 1888)
- 17 October - Samuel Holland, industrialist (died 1892)
- 18 October - Sir Richard Green-Price, 1st baronet, Liberal politician (died 1887)
- 23 November - Edward Edwards, zoologist (died 1879)
- 25 December - Sir Hugh Owen Owen, 2nd Baronet (died 1891).
- date unknown
  - Dafydd Jones (Dewi Dywyll), balladeer (died 1868)
  - Owain Meirion, balladeer (died 1868)

== Deaths ==
- 2 January - Sir Richard Perryn, judge, 79
- 29 April - Thomas Jones, landscape painter, 60
- 3 June - Lord George Murray, Bishop of St David's and developer of the UK's first optical telegraph, 42
- 28 September - Ralph Griffiths, editor and publisher, 83?
- 11 October - Henry Somerset, 5th Duke of Beaufort, Lord Lieutenant of Brecknockshire and Monmouthshire, 58
- date unknown - Thomas Evans, London bookseller, 64

== See also ==
- 1803 in Ireland
