= 1799 in Wales =

- Centuries: 16th; 17th; 18th; 19th; 20th
- Decades: 1770s; 1780s; 1790s; 1800s; 1810s
- See also: List of years in Wales; Timeline of Welsh history 1799 in Great Britain Scotland Elsewhere

This article is about the particular significance of the year 1799 to Wales and its people.

== Incumbents ==
- Lord Lieutenant of Anglesey – Henry Paget
- Lord Lieutenant of Brecknockshire and Monmouthshire – Henry Somerset, 5th Duke of Beaufort
- Lord Lieutenant of Caernarvonshire – Thomas Bulkeley, 7th Viscount Bulkeley
- Lord Lieutenant of Cardiganshire – Wilmot Vaughan, 1st Earl of Lisburne
- Lord Lieutenant of Carmarthenshire – John Vaughan
- Lord Lieutenant of Denbighshire – Sir Watkin Williams-Wynn, 5th Baronet
- Lord Lieutenant of Flintshire – Robert Grosvenor, 1st Marquess of Westminster
- Lord Lieutenant of Glamorgan – John Stuart, 1st Marquess of Bute
- Lord Lieutenant of Merionethshire - Sir Watkin Williams-Wynn, 5th Baronet
- Lord Lieutenant of Montgomeryshire – George Herbert, 2nd Earl of Powis
- Lord Lieutenant of Pembrokeshire – Richard Philipps, 1st Baron Milford
- Lord Lieutenant of Radnorshire – Thomas Harley
- Bishop of Bangor – John Warren
- Bishop of Llandaff – Richard Watson
- Bishop of St Asaph – Lewis Bagot
- Bishop of St Davids – William Stuart

== Events ==
- April
  - The Crumlin Arm of the Monmouthshire canal, with Fourteen Locks, is completed. It leaves the main line at Crindau, rising 358 feet (109m) through 32 locks to Crumlin (including the Cefn flight of Fourteen Locks).
  - The quarterly periodical Trysorfa Ysprydol is launched by Thomas Charles.
- July/August – Iolo Morganwg travels to North Wales to collect material for the Myvyrian Archaiology.
- October – Anthony Bushby Bacon and his brother Thomas take over the Hirwaun ironworks. Thomas sells his interest in the Plymouth ironworks to the Hill family.
- 16 October – Evan Pritchard (Ieuan Lleyn), David Thomas (Dafydd Ddu Eryri) and Griffith Williams (Gutyn Peris) are "ordained" bards of the province of Gwynedd by Iolo Morganwg.
- 25 December – HMS Ethalion is wrecked off the Penmarks.
- unknown dates
  - Following the failure of the Pembrokeshire fish harvest, Richard Fenton imports grain from the Mediterranean to relieve the plight of local people.
  - Peter Price becomes manager of Neath ironworks, and brings his family, including his wife Anna and his son Joseph Tregelles Price.
  - Japanner John Pyrke relocates to Usk from London.
  - Ann Hatton and her husband take a lease on Swansea Bathing House.
  - John Sevier, governor of Tennessee, writes of the alleged discovery of six skeletons in brass armour bearing the Welsh coat-of-arms.
  - Baptist leader and colonist Morgan John Rhys moves to Somerset County, Pennsylvania.
  - The Llandovery Bank is established, as W & D Jones & Co. Commonly known as the "Black Ox Bank" or "Banc yr Eidon", it is one of the earliest banks established in Carmarthenshire.
  - Robert Nicholl Carne begins construction of Dimlands, near Llantwit Major.

== Arts and literature ==
=== New books ===
- Philip Yorke – The Royal Tribes of Wales

== Births ==
- 26 May
  - Reginald Blewitt, MP for Monmouth Boroughs, landowner and newspaper publisher (d. 1878)
  - John Davies of Nercwys, Calvinistic Methodist minister, preacher and writer (d. 1879)
- 30 June – David Williams, politician (d. 1869)
- 10 October – Samuel Bowen, Independent minister (d. 1887)
- 21 December – John Vaughan, ironmaster (d. 1868)
- date unknown
  - Moses Davies, musician and hymn-writer (d. 1866)
  - Frederick Richard West, MP for Denbigh Boroughs (d. 1862)

== Deaths ==
- 1 March – Thomas Olivers, Methodist preacher and hymn-writer, 73
- May – John Evans, explorer, 29
- 15 July – John Breynton, clergyman, 80
- 3 September – William Thomas, academic and Chancellor of Llandaff Cathedral, 65
- 4 November – Josiah Tucker, economist, 87
- 14 December – Benjamin Francis, hymn-writer, 55
