= 1806 in Wales =

- Centuries: 17th; 18th; 19th; 20th; 21st
- Decades: 1780s; 1790s; 1800s; 1810s; 1820s
- See also: List of years in Wales; Timeline of Welsh history 1806 in The United Kingdom Scotland Elsewhere

This article is about the particular significance of the year 1806 to Wales and its people.

== Incumbents ==
- Lord Lieutenant of Anglesey – Henry Paget
- Lord Lieutenant of Brecknockshire and Monmouthshire – Henry Somerset, 6th Duke of Beaufort
- Lord Lieutenant of Caernarvonshire – Thomas Bulkeley, 7th Viscount Bulkeley
- Lord Lieutenant of Cardiganshire – Thomas Johnes
- Lord Lieutenant of Carmarthenshire – George Rice, 3rd Baron Dynevor
- Lord Lieutenant of Denbighshire – Sir Watkin Williams-Wynn, 5th Baronet
- Lord Lieutenant of Flintshire – Robert Grosvenor, 1st Marquess of Westminster
- Lord Lieutenant of Glamorgan – John Stuart, 1st Marquess of Bute
- Lord Lieutenant of Merionethshire – Sir Watkin Williams-Wynn, 5th Baronet
- Lord Lieutenant of Montgomeryshire – Edward Clive, 1st Earl of Powis
- Lord Lieutenant of Pembrokeshire – Richard Philipps, 1st Baron Milford
- Lord Lieutenant of Radnorshire – George Rodney, 3rd Baron Rodney
- Bishop of Bangor – William Cleaver (until 25 November)
- Bishop of Llandaff – Richard Watson
- Bishop of St Asaph – Samuel Horsley (until 4 October); William Cleaver (from 25 November)
- Bishop of St Davids – Thomas Burgess

== Events ==
- 21 October - Battle of Trafalgar: A British Royal Navy fleet led by Admiral Horatio Nelson defeats a combined French and Spanish fleet off the coast of Spain. About 465 of the 18,000 men on the British ships were born in Wales.
- 26 November - The Ellesmere Canal's Pontcysyllte Aqueduct is opened, the tallest and longest in Britain, completing the canal's Llangollen branch.
- unknown dates
  - John Kenrick III develops his great-uncle's chandlery at Wrexham into a bank.
  - Alban Thomas Jones-Gwynne builds the town of Aberaeron.

== Arts and literature ==
=== New books ===
- Thomas Charles - Geiriadur Ysgrythyrol
- Richard Colt Hoare - Life of Giraldus
- Theophilus Jones - History of the County of Brecknock, vol. 1
- Titus Lewis - A Welsh — English Dictionary, Geiriadur Cymraeg a Saesneg
- Robert Southey - Madoc

=== Music ===
- Edward Jones (Bardd y Brenin) takes up residence in St James's Palace.

=== Visual arts ===
- English watercolour landscape painter David Cox makes his first tour in Wales.

== Births ==
- 13 December - Robert Griffiths, inventor (died 1883)
- 19 December - John David Edwards, hymn-writer (died 1885)
- date unknown
  - Evan Davies, missionary (died 1864)
  - Hugh Hughes (Tegai), writer (died 1864)
  - John William Thomas, mathematician (died 1840)

== Deaths ==
- 15 April - Mary Morgan, servant, 16 (executed by hanging, for killing her newborn child)
- August - Ann Griffiths, poet and hymn-writer, 29
- 25 November - Jonathan Hughes, poet, 84

== Events ==
- 6 January - The William and Mary founders in the Irish Sea off Milford Haven, Pembrokeshire, with the loss of all hands.
- 9 January - The ship Cecelia, on a voyage from Dublin to Barbados, founders in the Irish Sea off Holyhead, Anglesey, with the loss of all hands.
- 10 March - The ship Prosperous founders off Anglesey with the loss of all hands.
- 6 May - The first Welsh language version of the New Testament issued by the British and Foreign Bible Society is published.
- 1 October - The brig Mary runs aground on the Arklow Bank, in the Irish Sea and is wrecked with the loss of seven of the ten people on board. Two of the survivors are rescued by Mary, a ship homeported in Liverpool, Lancashire, whilst the third is rescued by Mary, a ship homeported in Amlwch, Anglesey.
- 25 October - The sloop Margaret, on a voyage from Bristol, Gloucestershire to Greenock, Renfrewshire, is wrecked near Holyhead, Anglesey, with the loss of all on board.
- 3 December - Ships affected by a storm in the Irish Sea include:
  - Eliza, driven ashore at Cardigan, Pembrokeshire, on a voyage from Virginia, United States to Dublin. Her crew are rescued.
  - John, on a voyage from Youghal, County Cork to Dublin, driven ashore at Caernarfon.
  - Milford, driven ashore at Cardigan while on a voyage from Liverpool to Wilmington, Delaware, United States. Her crew are rescued.
- The first Nonconformist school in Wales is opened at Swansea.
- William Madocks obtains an Act of Parliament to allow him to construct a harbour at Portinllaen.
- William Owen Pughe inherits the estate of the Rev. Rees Pughe in Denbighshire and takes the surname "Pughe".
- Anthony Bushby Bacon sells his share of the Hirwaun ironworks to his brother Thomas and buys the Mathews' estate at Aberaman.
- Julia Ann Hatton moves to Kidwelly after her husband's death.
- A stone-built Caerleon Bridge is opened.
- A new bridge is built across the River Dyfi at Machynlleth.
- Thomas Jones of Denbigh marries for a third time, to Mary Lloyd.
- The Prince of Wales makes an impromptu visit to Wales in the company of Sir Richard Puleston. To commemorate the event, he plants a young oak tree.

== Arts and literature ==
=== New books ===
- Titus Lewis & Joseph Harris (Gomer) - Y Drysorfa Efangylaidd
- William Richards - Address on the Duration or Perpetuity of Christian Baptism, with some Introductory Hints upon the Subjects and Mode of that Ordinance
- Thomas Roberts of Llwynrhudol - Amddiffyniad i'r Methodistiaid
- Charles Symmons - Life of Milton

=== Music ===
- Casgliad o Hymnau gan mwyaf heb erioed eu hargraffu o'r blaen (collection of hymns)

== Births ==
- 17 January - William Saunders, poet (died 1851)
- 1 February - Jane Williams (Ysgafell), writer (died 1885)
- 9 April - Theophilus Redwood, pharmacist (died 1892)
- 21 April - Sir George Cornewall Lewis, statesman (died 1863)
- date unknown
  - Joseph Murray Ince, painter (died 1859)
  - Harry Longueville Jones, archæologist, artist and Inspector of Schools for Wales (died 1870)
  - David Pugh, politician (died 1890)
- probable - Thomas Rees (Twm Carnabwth), Rebecca rioter (died 1876)

== Deaths ==
- 2 March - Robert Watkin Wynne, politician, 52?
- 12 April - Evan Davies, Independent minister, 56
- 19 September - John Roberts, hymn-writer, 75
- October - Gabriel Jones, Welsh American lawyer and politician, 82
- 4 October - Samuel Horsley, Bishop of St Asaph
- date unknown
  - Fulke Greville, former MP for Monmouth Boroughs

== See also ==
- 1806 in Ireland
