= 1805 in Wales =

- Centuries: 17th; 18th; 19th; 20th; 21st
- Decades: 1780s; 1790s; 1800s; 1810s; 1820s
- See also: List of years in Wales; Timeline of Welsh history 1805 in The United Kingdom Scotland Elsewhere

This article is about the particular significance of the year 1805 to Wales and its people.

== Incumbents ==
- Lord Lieutenant of Anglesey – Henry Paget
- Lord Lieutenant of Brecknockshire and Monmouthshire – Henry Somerset, 6th Duke of Beaufort
- Lord Lieutenant of Caernarvonshire – Thomas Bulkeley, 7th Viscount Bulkeley
- Lord Lieutenant of Cardiganshire – Thomas Johnes
- Lord Lieutenant of Carmarthenshire – John Vaughan (until 19 January); George Rice, 3rd Baron Dynevor (from 21 April)
- Lord Lieutenant of Denbighshire – Sir Watkin Williams-Wynn, 5th Baronet
- Lord Lieutenant of Flintshire – Robert Grosvenor, 1st Marquess of Westminster
- Lord Lieutenant of Glamorgan – John Stuart, 1st Marquess of Bute
- Lord Lieutenant of Merionethshire - Sir Watkin Williams-Wynn, 5th Baronet
- Lord Lieutenant of Montgomeryshire – Edward Clive, 1st Earl of Powis
- Lord Lieutenant of Pembrokeshire – Richard Philipps, 1st Baron Milford
- Lord Lieutenant of Radnorshire – George Rodney, 3rd Baron Rodney
- Bishop of Bangor – William Cleaver
- Bishop of Llandaff – Richard Watson
- Bishop of St Asaph – Samuel Horsley
- Bishop of St Davids – Thomas Burgess

== Events ==
- 21 October - Battle of Trafalgar: A British Royal Navy fleet led by Admiral Horatio Nelson defeats a combined French and Spanish fleet off the coast of Spain. About 465 of the 18,000 men on the British ships were born in Wales.
- 26 November - The Ellesmere Canal's Pontcysyllte Aqueduct is opened, the tallest and longest in Britain, completing the canal's Llangollen branch.
- unknown dates
  - John Kenrick III develops his great-uncle's chandlery at Wrexham into a bank.
  - Alban Thomas Jones-Gwynne builds the town of Aberaeron.

== Arts and literature ==
=== New books ===
- Thomas Charles - Geiriadur Ysgrythyrol
- Theophilus Jones - History of the County of Brecknock, vol. 1
- Titus Lewis - A Welsh — English Dictionary, Geiriadur Cymraeg a Saesneg
- Robert Southey - Madoc

=== Music ===
- Edward Jones (Bardd y Brenin) takes up residence in St James's Palace.

=== Visual arts ===
- English watercolour landscape painter David Cox makes his first tour in Wales.

== Births ==
- 13 December - Robert Griffiths, inventor (died 1883)
- 19 December - John David Edwards, hymn-writer (died 1885)
- date unknown
  - Evan Davies, missionary (died 1864)
  - Hugh Hughes (Tegai), writer (died 1864)
  - John William Thomas, mathematician (died 1840)

== Deaths ==
- 15 April - Mary Morgan, servant, 16 (executed by hanging, for killing her newborn child)
- August - Ann Griffiths, poet and hymn-writer, 29
- 25 November - Jonathan Hughes, poet, 84

== See also ==
- 1805 in Ireland
