= 1800 in Wales =

- Centuries: 16th; 17th; 18th; 19th; 20th
- Decades: 1780s; 1790s; 1800s; 1810s; 1820s
- See also: List of years in Wales; Timeline of Welsh history 1800 in Great Britain Scotland Elsewhere

This article is about the particular significance of the year 1800 to Wales and its people.

== Incumbents ==
- Lord Lieutenant of Anglesey – Henry Paget
- Lord Lieutenant of Brecknockshire and Monmouthshire – Henry Somerset, 5th Duke of Beaufort
- Lord Lieutenant of Caernarvonshire – Thomas Bulkeley, 7th Viscount Bulkeley
- Lord Lieutenant of Cardiganshire – Wilmot Vaughan, 1st Earl of Lisburne (until 6 January); Thomas Johnes (from 4 July)
- Lord Lieutenant of Carmarthenshire – John Vaughan
- Lord Lieutenant of Denbighshire – Sir Watkin Williams-Wynn, 5th Baronet
- Lord Lieutenant of Flintshire – Robert Grosvenor, 1st Marquess of Westminster
- Lord Lieutenant of Glamorgan – John Stuart, 1st Marquess of Bute
- Lord Lieutenant of Merionethshire - Sir Watkin Williams-Wynn, 5th Baronet
- Lord Lieutenant of Montgomeryshire – George Herbert, 2nd Earl of Powis
- Lord Lieutenant of Pembrokeshire – Richard Philipps, 1st Baron Milford
- Lord Lieutenant of Radnorshire – Thomas Harley
- Bishop of Bangor – John Warren (until 27 January); William Cleaver (from 24 May)
- Bishop of Llandaff – Richard Watson
- Bishop of St Asaph – Lewis Bagot
- Bishop of St Davids – William Stuart (until October); Lord George Murray (nominated)

== Events ==
- February - John Bryan begins preaching.
- 5 May - Missionary John Davies sets out for Tahiti.
- 1 August - The Naval Temple on The Kymin at Monmouth is dedicated.
- August - Owen Davies and John Hughes arrive in Ruthin to superintend the Wesleyan Methodist mission to Wales.
- December - The Brecon Canal opens between Brecon and Talybont.
- unknown dates
  - Richard Fothergill goes into partnership with Samuel Homfray at Tredegar. Jeremiah Homfray begins leasing mineral lands at Abernant, Cwmbach, and Rhigos.
  - Edward Charles becomes official "bard" of the Gwyneddigion Society.
  - Thomas Charles introduces the practice of allowing Calvinistic Methodist congregations to elect their own elders.
  - Richard Ellis succeeds his father, Lewis Ellis, as organist of Beaumaris Church.
  - William Jones establishes a grammar school at Wrexham.
  - William Nott joins the Bengal European Regiment in India.

== Arts and literature ==
=== New books ===
==== English language ====
- William Bingley - Tour round North Wales
- John Evans - A Tour through part of North Wales in ... 1798 and at other times
- John Jones - A Development of ... Events calculated to restore the Christian Religion to its ... Purity
- Thomas Jones - A Cardiganshire Landlord's Advice to his Tenants
- Richard Llwyd - Beaumaris Bay
- William Ouseley - Epitome of the Ancient History of Persia
- Henry Wigstead - Remarks on a Tour to North and South Wales: In the Year 1797

==== Welsh language ====
- Timothy Thomas - Traethiad am y Wisg-Wen Ddisglair (2nd edition)

=== Music ===
- "Suo Gân" (approximate first printing)

== Births ==
- 4 March - Dr William Price, physician (d. 1893)
- 6 March - Samuel Roberts (S.R.), Radical leader (d. 1885)
- 22 March - Thomas Bevan, Archdeacon of St David's (d. 1863)
- 20 June - Edward Douglas-Pennant, 1st Baron Penrhyn (d. 1886)
- 1 August - Elizabeth Randles, musical prodigy (d. 1829)
- 1 October - Williams Evans, hymnist (d. 1880)
- 30 October - Ernest Vaughan, 4th Earl of Lisburne, landowner and politician (d. 1873)
- 29 November - David Griffith (Clwydfardd), poet and archdruid (d. 1894)
- date unknown
  - James James (Iago Emlyn), minister and poet (d. 1879)
  - David Morris, politician (d. 1864)

== Deaths ==
- 6 January
  - William Jones of Neyland, clergyman and author, 73
  - Wilmot Vaughan, 1st Earl of Lisburne, politician, 71
- 27 January - John Warren, Bishop of St David's and later of Bangor
- 14 March - Daines Barrington, antiquary and naturalist, 72
- May - Evan Hughes (Hughes Fawr), clergyman and author, age unknown
- 14 July - Basil Feilding, 6th Earl of Denbigh, 81
