= 1801 in Wales =

- Centuries: 17th; 18th; 19th; 20th; 21st
- Decades: 1780s; 1790s; 1800s; 1810s; 1820s
- See also: List of years in Wales; Timeline of Welsh history 1801 in The United Kingdom Scotland Elsewhere

This article is about the particular significance of the year 1801 to Wales and its people.

== Incumbents ==
- Lord Lieutenant of Anglesey – Henry Paget
- Lord Lieutenant of Brecknockshire and Monmouthshire – Henry Somerset, 5th Duke of Beaufort
- Lord Lieutenant of Caernarvonshire – Thomas Bulkeley, 7th Viscount Bulkeley
- Lord Lieutenant of Cardiganshire – Thomas Johnes
- Lord Lieutenant of Carmarthenshire – John Vaughan
- Lord Lieutenant of Denbighshire – Sir Watkin Williams-Wynn, 5th Baronet
- Lord Lieutenant of Flintshire – Robert Grosvenor, 1st Marquess of Westminster
- Lord Lieutenant of Glamorgan – John Stuart, 1st Marquess of Bute
- Lord Lieutenant of Merionethshire - Sir Watkin Williams-Wynn, 5th Baronet
- Lord Lieutenant of Montgomeryshire – George Herbert, 2nd Earl of Powis (until 16 January); vacant until 1804
- Lord Lieutenant of Pembrokeshire – Richard Philipps, 1st Baron Milford
- Lord Lieutenant of Radnorshire – Thomas Harley
- Bishop of Bangor – William Cleaver
- Bishop of Llandaff – Richard Watson
- Bishop of St Asaph – Lewis Bagot
- Bishop of St Davids – Lord George Murray

== Events ==
- Chirk aqueduct is completed and opened.
- First railway in north Wales is built by Lord Penrhyn to link his quarries with Bethesda and Port Penrhyn.
- John Rice Jones becomes first attorney-general of Indiana.
- The "Great Debate" is held at Ramoth Chapel in Llanfrothen, Merionethshire, as a result of which John Richard Jones forms the "Scottish Baptist" connexion.

== Arts and literature ==
=== New books ===
- Cyhoeddiadau Cymdeithas y Gwyneddigion
- The Myvyrian Archaiology of Wales, vol. 1
- Azariah Shadrach - Allwedd Myfyrdod
- Hester Thrale - Retrospection: or a review of the most striking events, characters, situations, and their consequences, which the last eighteen hundred years have presented to the view of mankind

== Births ==
- 6 January – Evan Davies (Myfyr Morganwg), bard, druid and antiquarian (d. 1888)
- 6 February – William Williams (Caledfryn), poet and critic (d. 1869)
- 1 November – John Lloyd Davies, politician (d. 1860)
- 18 November – David Rees (Y Cynhyrfwr), minister and writer (d. 1869)
- 23 December – William Watkin Edward Wynne, politician (d. 1880)
- date unknown – Thomas Phillips, lawyer, politician and businessman, mayor of Newport (d. 1867)

== Deaths ==
- 16 January – George Herbert, 2nd Earl of Powis, 45
- 14 February – Rhys Jones, antiquary, 87
- 23 September – Thomas Nowell, historian, 71?
- 13 December – William Edwardes, 1st Baron Kensington, about 90
- probable – Frances Williams, convicted thief, one of the first women to settle Australia, 40/41

== See also ==
- 1801 in Ireland
