= 1808 in Wales =

- Centuries: 17th; 18th; 19th; 20th; 21st
- Decades: 1780s; 1790s; 1800s; 1810s; 1820s
- See also: List of years in Wales; Timeline of Welsh history 1808 in The United Kingdom Scotland Elsewhere

This article is about the particular significance of the year 1808 to Wales and its people.

== Incumbents ==
- Lord Lieutenant of Anglesey – Henry Paget
- Lord Lieutenant of Brecknockshire and Monmouthshire – Henry Somerset, 6th Duke of Beaufort
- Lord Lieutenant of Caernarvonshire – Thomas Bulkeley, 7th Viscount Bulkeley
- Lord Lieutenant of Cardiganshire – Thomas Johnes
- Lord Lieutenant of Carmarthenshire – George Rice, 3rd Baron Dynevor
- Lord Lieutenant of Denbighshire – Sir Watkin Williams-Wynn, 5th Baronet
- Lord Lieutenant of Flintshire – Robert Grosvenor, 1st Marquess of Westminster
- Lord Lieutenant of Glamorgan – John Stuart, 1st Marquess of Bute
- Lord Lieutenant of Merionethshire - Sir Watkin Williams-Wynn, 5th Baronet
- Lord Lieutenant of Montgomeryshire – Edward Clive, 1st Earl of Powis
- Lord Lieutenant of Pembrokeshire – Richard Philipps, 1st Baron Milford
- Lord Lieutenant of Radnorshire – George Rodney, 3rd Baron Rodney
- Bishop of Bangor – John Randolph
- Bishop of Llandaff – Richard Watson
- Bishop of St Asaph – William Cleaver
- Bishop of St Davids – Thomas Burgess

== Events ==
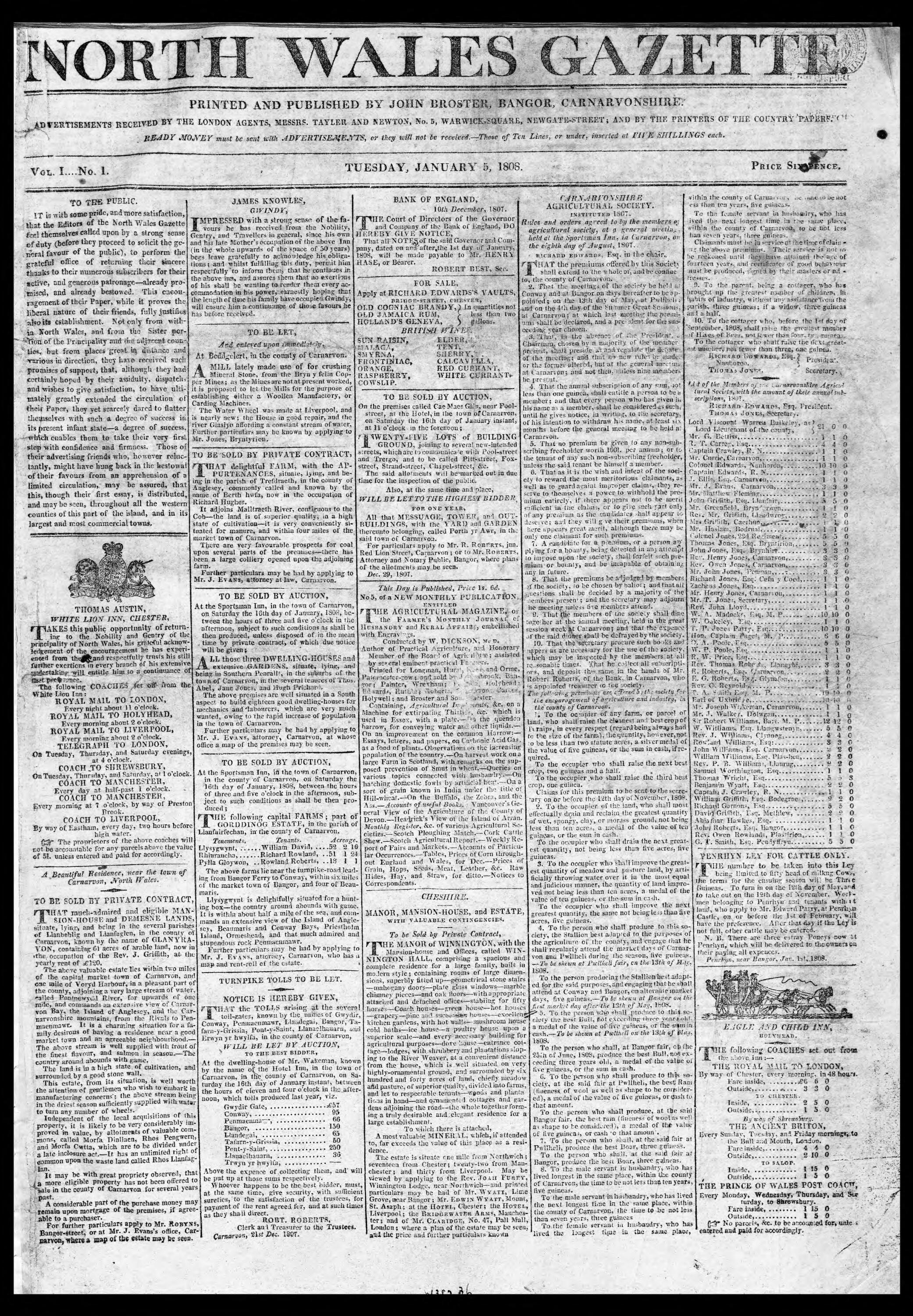
5 January: First edition of the North Wales Gazette

- 5 January - The first issue of The North Wales Gazette is printed at Bangor.
- 20 September - The White Book of Hergest is destroyed in a fire at Covent Garden.
- 30 October - William Lort Mansel is consecrated Bishop of Bristol.
- 19 November - The naval frigate HMS Owen Glendower is launched.
- date unknown
  - Construction of the Horseshoe Falls on the River Dee by Thomas Telford.
  - The publishing house Gwasg Gee is founded.
  - St Katherine's Church, Milford Haven, built by Charles Francis Greville, is consecrated.
  - Benjamin Hall is given the Abercarn estate by his father-in-law, Richard Crawshay.
  - The Ruabon Brook Tramway is extended from Acrefair to the Plas Madoc Colliery in Plasbennion.
  - Twelve-year-old Charles Nice Davies goes to serve in India as an ensign.

== Arts and literature ==
=== New books ===
==== English language ====
- Felicia Hemans - Juvenile Poems

==== Welsh language ====
- Robert Davies (Bardd Nantglyn) - Ieithiadur neu Ramadeg Cymraeg
- Thomas Edwards (Twm o'r Nant) - Bannau y Byd
- Titus Lewis - Llyfr Rhyfeddodau

=== Music ===
- Hymnau o Fawl i Dduw a'r Oen (hymns by Ann Griffiths, posthumously published)

== Births ==
- 30 January - Sir John Henry Scourfield, author (died 1876)
- 6 March - William Williams (Carw Coch), man of letters and eisteddfodwr (died 1872)
- 13 May - Thomas Aubrey, Wesleyan leader (died 1867)
- date unknown
  - Dic Penderyn, labourer executed for his part in the Merthyr Rising (died 1831)
  - William Roos, artist and engraver (died 1878)

== Deaths ==
- 21 January – Richard Pennant, 1st Baron Penrhyn, about 70
- 12 February – Anna Maria Bennett, novelist, about 70
- 12 September – Charles Herbert, Royal Navy officer, son of the Earl of Carnarvon, 34 (drowned)
- 30 November – Watkin Williams, politician, 66?
- 28 December – Griffith Roberts, physician and collector of manuscripts, 73

== See also ==
- 1808 in Ireland
