= 1804 in Wales =

- Centuries: 17th; 18th; 19th; 20th; 21st
- Decades: 1780s; 1790s; 1800s; 1810s; 1820s
- See also: List of years in Wales; Timeline of Welsh history 1804 in The United Kingdom Scotland Elsewhere

This article is about the particular significance of the year 1804 to Wales and its people.

== Incumbents ==
- Lord Lieutenant of Anglesey – Henry Paget
- Lord Lieutenant of Brecknockshire and Monmouthshire – Henry Somerset, 6th Duke of Beaufort
- Lord Lieutenant of Caernarvonshire – Thomas Bulkeley, 7th Viscount Bulkeley
- Lord Lieutenant of Cardiganshire – Thomas Johnes
- Lord Lieutenant of Carmarthenshire – John Vaughan (until 19 January); George Rice, 3rd Baron Dynevor (from 21 April)
- Lord Lieutenant of Denbighshire – Sir Watkin Williams-Wynn, 5th Baronet
- Lord Lieutenant of Flintshire – Robert Grosvenor, 1st Marquess of Westminster
- Lord Lieutenant of Glamorgan – John Stuart, 1st Marquess of Bute
- Lord Lieutenant of Merionethshire - Sir Watkin Williams-Wynn, 5th Baronet
- Lord Lieutenant of Montgomeryshire – vacant until 1804
- Lord Lieutenant of Pembrokeshire – Richard Philipps, 1st Baron Milford
- Lord Lieutenant of Radnorshire – Thomas Harley (until 1 December); George Rodney, 3rd Baron Rodney
- Bishop of Bangor – William Cleaver
- Bishop of Llandaff – Richard Watson
- Bishop of St Asaph – Samuel Horsley
- Bishop of St Davids – Thomas Burgess

== Events ==
- February 21 - The Cornishman Richard Trevithick's newly built "Penydarren" steam locomotive operates on the Merthyr Tramroad between the Penydarren Ironworks in Merthyr Tydfil and Abercynon, following several trials since February 13, the world's first locomotive to work on rails. As a result of this achievement, Samuel Homfray wins a 1000 guineas wager with Richard Crawshay as to which of them could first build a steam locomotive for use in their works.
- March 7 - Inauguration of the British and Foreign Bible Society, largely at the instigation of Thomas Charles.
- The Cambrian is the first newspaper published in Wales.

== Arts and literature ==
=== New books ===
- Edward Davies - Celtic Researches on the Origin, Traditions and Languages of the Ancient Britons
- Richard Llwyd
  - Gayton Wake, or Mary Dod
  - Poems, Tales, Odes, Sonnets, Translations from the British
- Benjamin Heath Malkin - The Scenery, Antiquities, and Biography of South Wales
- Azariah Shadrach - Drws i'r Meddwl Segur
- Hester Thrale - British Synonymy: or an attempt at regulating the choice of words in familiar conversation

=== Music ===
- Edward Jones - The Lyric Airs

== Births ==
- 14 January - Sir Hugh Owen, educationist (died 1881)
- 20 January - John Jones (Idrisyn), clergyman and author (died 1887)
- 2 March - Henry Davies, journalist (died 1890)
- 5 March - John Davies (Siôn Gymro), minister and linguist (died 1884)
- 31 March - Rice Rees, clergyman and historian (died 1839)
- 12 April (in Indiana) - George Wallace Jones, US senator and son of Welsh lawyer John Rice Jones (died 1896)
- date unknown - Benjamin Price, first bishop of the "Free Church of England" (died 1896)

== Deaths ==
- 19 January - John Vaughan, politician, about 51
- 19 March - Philip Yorke, politician and antiquary, 60
- 17 May - Mary Penry, Moravian settler in Pennsylvania, 68
- 20 September - Josiah Rees, Unitarian minister, 59
- 1 December - Thomas Harley, Lord Lieutenant of Radnorshire, 74
- 7 December - Morgan John Rhys, Baptist minister, 43

== See also ==
- 1804 in Ireland
