= 1865 in Wales =

- Centuries: 17th; 18th; 19th; 20th; 21st
- Decades: 1840s; 1850s; 1860s; 1870s; 1880s
- See also: List of years in Wales; Timeline of Welsh history 1865 in The United Kingdom Scotland Elsewhere

This article is about the particular significance of the year 1865 to Wales and its people.

== Incumbents ==
- Lord Lieutenant of Anglesey – Henry Paget, 2nd Marquess of Anglesey
- Lord Lieutenant of Brecknockshire – John Lloyd Vaughan Watkins (until 28 September) George Pratt, 2nd Marquess Camden (from 4 November)
- Lord Lieutenant of Caernarvonshire – Sir Richard Williams-Bulkeley, 10th Baronet
- Lord Lieutenant of Cardiganshire – Edward Pryse
- Lord Lieutenant of Carmarthenshire – John Campbell, 2nd Earl Cawdor
- Lord Lieutenant of Denbighshire – Robert Myddelton Biddulph
- Lord Lieutenant of Flintshire – Sir Stephen Glynne, 9th Baronet
- Lord Lieutenant of Glamorgan – Christopher Rice Mansel Talbot
- Lord Lieutenant of Merionethshire – Edward Lloyd-Mostyn, 2nd Baron Mostyn
- Lord Lieutenant of Monmouthshire – Benjamin Hall, 1st Baron Llanover
- Lord Lieutenant of Montgomeryshire – Sudeley Hanbury-Tracy, 3rd Baron Sudeley
- Lord Lieutenant of Pembrokeshire – William Edwardes, 3rd Baron Kensington
- Lord Lieutenant of Radnorshire – John Walsh, 1st Baron Ormathwaite
- Bishop of Bangor – James Colquhoun Campbell
- Bishop of Llandaff – Alfred Ollivant
- Bishop of St Asaph – Thomas Vowler Short
- Bishop of St Davids – Connop Thirlwall

== Events ==
- 5 January — The Festiniog Railway officially opens to passengers, the first narrow gauge railway in the British Isles to do so.
- 14 January — American Confederate paddle steamer Lelia sinks off the north Wales coast with the loss of eighteen lives.
- 1 February — The Vale of Neath Railway is amalgamated with the Great Western Railway.
- 14 April
  - Opening of the Royal Pier, Aberystwyth, built by Eugenius Birch at a cost of £13,600.
  - Paddle steamer Great Empress collides with Beaumaris Pier.
- May
  - Opening of Talyllyn Railway.
  - A branch of The Philanthropic Order of True Ivorites Friendly Society is established and registered at Colwinston.
- 28 May — The Mimosa sets sail with emigrants for Patagonia.
- 10 June — Opening of Penarth Dock.
- 3 July — Opening of Barmouth Junction on the Aberystwith and Welsh Coast Railway.
- 28 July — The town of Puerto Madryn and the Patagonian colony is founded by Michael D. Jones.
- 2 August — The Wales memorial to the late Prince Albert at Tenby, sculpted by John Evan Thomas, is unveiled by Albert and Victoria's 3rd son, 15-year-old Prince Arthur on his first public engagement.
- 9 September — First of fifteen deaths in the only outbreak of yellow fever ever to occur in Britain, at Swansea.
- 21 October — Opening of Howells (department store) in Cardiff as a drapery.
- 29 November — Two men die when a coal train falls into the North Dock at Swansea.
- 1 December — Llandrindod Wells is linked to the rail network for the first time.
- 20 December — Gethin Pit disaster, Abercanaid: the second of two firedamp explosions at this colliery near Merthyr Tydfil kills 34 miners.
- Francis Kilvert becomes curate of Clyro in Radnorshire.
- Sale of the Pwyllycrochan estate, leading to the development of Colwyn Bay.
- John Crichton-Stuart, Marquess of Bute, meets architect and designer William Burges.
- Robert Jones Derfel retires from the ministry and sets up a Welsh bookshop and press in Manchester.

== Arts and literature ==
=== Awards ===
- National Eisteddfod of Wales is held at Aberystwyth. The chair is won by Lewis William Lewis (Llew Llwyfo).

=== New books ===
- Morris Davies — Cofiant Ann Griffiths
- John Evans (I. D. Ffraid) — Coll Gwynfa (translation of Milton's Paradise Lost)
- John Ceiriog Hughes — Y Bardd a'r Cerddor
- John Jones (Mathetes) — Pregeth i Fyfyrwyr Coleg Hwlffordd ...
- John Thomas (Ifor Cwmgwys) — Diferion Meddyliol

=== Music ===
- Thomas Gruffydd Jones (Tafalaw Bencerdd) — Gwarchae Harlech (cantata)

== Sport ==
- Cricket
  - 17 July — South Wales Cricket Club travels to Gravesend to play the Gentlemen of Kent.
  - August — Morriston Cricket Club is founded.

== Births ==
- 2 February — Henry Davies, cricketer (died 1934)
- 28 February — Arthur Symons, poet and critic (died 1945)
- 7 March — Martyn Jordan, Wales international rugby player (died 1902)
- 30 April — Max Nettlau, German historian and Welsh learner (died 1944)
- 3 June — Prince George, second son of the Prince and Princess of Wales and himself Prince of Wales 1901–1910 (later King George V of the United Kingdom; died 1936)
- 6 August — Lewis Cobden Thomas, Wales international rugby player (died 1928)
- 22 August — Stephen Thomas Wales international rugby player (died 1937)
- 8 September — David Williams, Swansea politician (died 1941)
- 23 September — William Brace, politician (died 1947)
- 20 October — Sir Rhys Rhys-Williams, 1st Baronet, judge (died 1955)
- 26 October — Hugh Ingledew, Wales international rugby player (died 1937)
- October — Jack Doughty, footballer (died 1937)
- 16 December — George Rowles, footballer (died 1922)
- December — Richard Bagnall-Oakeley, Olympic archer (died 1947)
- date unknown
  - Dickie Garrett, rugby player (died 1908)
  - Albert Hybart, rugby player (died 1945)
  - George Owen, footballer (died 1922)
  - Robert Roberts, footballer (died 1945)

== Deaths ==
- 21 February — Stapleton Cotton, military leader, 91
- 26 April — William Williams, MP, 77
- 29 April — Thomas Evans (Telynog), poet, 24
- 18 June — William Parker Foulke, Welsh-descended American geologist, 49
- 10 August — Hugh Pugh, mariner, 71
- 28 September — John Lloyd Vaughan Watkins, politician, Lord Lieutenant of Brecknockshire, 63
- 20 November — Rees Howell Gronow, soldier, politician and memoirist, 70

== See also ==
- 1865 in Ireland
