= 1889 in Wales =

- Centuries: 17th; 18th; 19th; 20th; 21st
- Decades: 1860s; 1870s; 1880s; 1890s; 1900s
- See also: List of years in Wales; Timeline of Welsh history 1889 in The United Kingdom Scotland Elsewhere

This article is about the particular significance of the year 1889 to Wales and its people.

== Incumbents ==
- Archdruid of the National Eisteddfod of Wales – Clwydfardd
- Lord Lieutenant of Anglesey – Richard Davies
- Lord Lieutenant of Brecknockshire – Joseph Bailey, 1st Baron Glanusk
- Lord Lieutenant of Caernarvonshire – John Ernest Greaves
- Lord Lieutenant of Cardiganshire – Herbert Davies-Evans
- Lord Lieutenant of Carmarthenshire – John Campbell, 2nd Earl Cawdor
- Lord Lieutenant of Denbighshire – William Cornwallis-West
- Lord Lieutenant of Flintshire – Hugh Robert Hughes
- Lord Lieutenant of Glamorgan – Christopher Rice Mansel Talbot
- Lord Lieutenant of Merionethshire – Robert Davies Pryce
- Lord Lieutenant of Monmouthshire – Henry Somerset, 8th Duke of Beaufort
- Lord Lieutenant of Montgomeryshire – Edward Herbert, 3rd Earl of Powis
- Lord Lieutenant of Pembrokeshire – William Edwardes, 4th Baron Kensington
- Lord Lieutenant of Radnorshire – Arthur Walsh, 2nd Baron Ormathwaite
- Bishop of Bangor – James Colquhoun Campbell
- Bishop of Llandaff – Richard Lewis
- Bishop of St Asaph – Joshua Hughes (until 21 January) Alfred George Edwards (from 25 March)
- Bishop of St Davids – Basil Jones

== Events ==
- January – First Glamorgan County Council elections are held.
- 8 February – Nine people drown in a ferry accident at Pembroke Dock.
- 14 February – The first edition of the North Wales Weekly News is published (under the title Weekly News and Visitors’ Chronicle for Colwyn Bay, Colwyn, Llandrillo, Conway, Deganway and Neighbourhood).
- 13 March – Twenty miners are killed in an accident at the Brynmally Colliery, Wrexham.
- 1 April – New elected county councils in England and Wales created by the Local Government Act 1888, take up their powers. That for Radnorshire meets in Presteigne.
- June – A lion escapes from a travelling menagerie at Llandrindod Wells.
- 18 July – Opening of the first dock basin at Barry.
- 3 August – Opening of Hawarden Bridge.
- 12 August – The passing of the Welsh Intermediate Education Act marks the beginning of secondary education in Wales.
- 15 August – Three men are killed in a mining accident at Wenvoe Quarry, Glamorgan.
- 26 August – Act of incorporation of the Barry Railway Company#Vale of Glamorgan Railway.
- Approximate date – The Showmen's Guild of Great Britain is co-founded in Salford as the United Kingdom Van Dwellers Protection Association by Jacob Studt and other active Welsh cinema pioneers.

== Arts and literature ==
=== Awards ===
National Eisteddfod of Wales – held at Brecon

- Chair – Evan Rees, "Y Beibl Cymraeg"
- Crown – Howell Elvet Lewis

=== New books ===
- Owen Morgan Edwards – O'r Bala i Geneva

=== Music ===
- Sir Henry Walford Davies – The Future, for chorus and orchestra

== Sport ==
- Cricket – Glamorgan County Cricket Club plays its first match, against Warwickshire at Cardiff Arms Park.
- Rugby union – Bedwas RFC, Blackwood RFC and Llantwit Major RFC are formed.

== Births ==
- 12 January – John Bryn Edwards, ironmaster and philanthropist (died 1922)
- 22 January – John Emlyn-Jones, politician (died 1952)
- 28 January – Phil Waller, Wales and British Lions rugby player (died 1917)
- 31 January – Jack Evans, footballer (died 1971)
- 1 February – John Lewis, philosopher (died 1976)
- 10 February – Howard Spring, novelist (died 1965)
- 28 February – George Jeffreys, Pentecostal (died 1962)
- 5 May – Stanley Winmill, Wales international rugby union player (died 1940)
- 24 June – Harry Symonds, cricketer (died 1945)
- 17 July – Aled Owen Roberts, politician (died 1949)
- 5 August – William Davies Thomas, academic (died 1954)
- 10 August – Irene Steer, swimmer (died 1977)
- 21 August – Henry Lewis, Professor at Swansea University (died 1968)
- 23 October – William Havard, Bishop of St Davids and international rugby player (died 1956)
- 11 December – Cedric Morris, artist (died 1982)

== Deaths ==
- 21 January – Joshua Hughes, Bishop of St Asaph, 81
- 27 March – John Bright, Radical politician associated with Llandudno, 77
- 10 April – Kilsby Jones, nonconformist minister, writer and lecturer, 76
- 27 May – George Owen Rees, Welsh-Italian doctor, 75
- 8 June – Gerard Manley Hopkins, Anglo-Welsh poet, 44 (in Ireland)
- 17 June – John Hughes, industrialist, 73 (in St Petersburg)
- 26 June – Walter Rice Howell Powell, landowner and politician, 69
- 28 September – Samuel Goldsworthy, Wales international rugby player, 34
- 15 October – Sir Daniel Gooch, railway engineer and politician, 73
- 29 October – Godfrey Darbishire, Wales rugby international player, 36
- 14 November – James Stephens, stonemason, Chartist, and later Australian trade unionist, 68
- 18 November – Charles Easton Spooner, railway pioneer, 71
- date unknown – G. Phillips Bevan, statistician, geographer and author, 59/60
- probable – Richard Williams Morgan, clergyman and poet

== See also ==
- 1889 in Ireland
