= 1802 in Wales =

- Centuries: 17th; 18th; 19th; 20th; 21st
- Decades: 1780s; 1790s; 1800s; 1810s; 1820s
- See also: List of years in Wales; Timeline of Welsh history 1802 in The United Kingdom Scotland Elsewhere

This article is about the particular significance of the year 1802 to Wales and its people.

== Incumbents ==
- Lord Lieutenant of Anglesey – Henry Paget
- Lord Lieutenant of Brecknockshire and Monmouthshire – Henry Somerset, 5th Duke of Beaufort
- Lord Lieutenant of Caernarvonshire – Thomas Bulkeley, 7th Viscount Bulkeley
- Lord Lieutenant of Cardiganshire – Thomas Johnes
- Lord Lieutenant of Carmarthenshire – John Vaughan
- Lord Lieutenant of Denbighshire – Sir Watkin Williams-Wynn, 5th Baronet
- Lord Lieutenant of Flintshire – Robert Grosvenor, 1st Marquess of Westminster
- Lord Lieutenant of Glamorgan – John Stuart, 1st Marquess of Bute
- Lord Lieutenant of Merionethshire - Sir Watkin Williams-Wynn, 5th Baronet
- Lord Lieutenant of Montgomeryshire – vacant until 1804
- Lord Lieutenant of Pembrokeshire – Richard Philipps, 1st Baron Milford
- Lord Lieutenant of Radnorshire – Thomas Harley
- Bishop of Bangor – William Cleaver
- Bishop of Llandaff – Richard Watson
- Bishop of St Asaph – Lewis Bagot (until 4 June); Samuel Horsley
- Bishop of St Davids – Lord George Murray

== Events ==
- August - Sir William and Lady Hamilton visit Milford Haven, along with Admiral Horatio Nelson. Nelson subsequently visits Monmouth and the Naval Temple on The Kymin. Also on his Welsh expedition he visits Cyfarthfa Ironworks, in recognition of its contribution to the war effort.
- 8 October - A Unitarian Association is formed in South Wales, with Josiah Rees and Iolo Morganwg among its leaders.
- unknown dates
  - North Wales Baptist Association is launched by Christmas Evans.
  - Sir John Nicholl is elected to Parliament for the first time.
  - Sir Robert Williames Vaughan marries Anna Maria Mostyn, daughter of Sir Roger Mostyn, 5th Baronet.

== Arts and literature ==
=== New books ===
- Thomas Charles - The Welsh Methodists Vindicated
- Abraham Rees - The New Cyclopaedia, vol. 1

=== Music ===
- Edward Jones (Bardd y Brenin) - The Musical and Poetical Relicks of the Welsh Bards, vol. 2

== Sport ==
- Royal Anglesey Yacht Club founded at Beaumaris.

== Births ==
- 15 July - James Allen, Bishop of St David's (d. 1897)
- August - Ebenezer Thomas, poet (d. 1863)
- 24 August - William Rowlands (Gwilym Lleyn) (d. 1865)
- 26 August - George Wightwick, architect working in south west England and pioneer architectural journalist (d. 1872)
- 8 November
  - Benjamin Hall, 1st Baron Llanover (d. 1867)
  - William Rees (Gwilym Hiraethog), poet and author (d. 1883)
- 4 December - Calvert Jones, pioneer photographer (d. 1877)
- 12 December
  - John Ryland Harris, printer (d. 1823)
  - Isaac Williams, poet (d. 1865)
- date unknown - Thomas Robert Jones, founder of The Philanthropic Order of True Ivorites (d. 1856)

== Deaths ==
- 3 April - John Williams, evangelical clergyman, about 40
- 4 April - Lloyd Kenyon, 1st Baron Kenyon, politician and barrister, 69
- 26 May - Joseph Hoare, academic (b. 1709)
- 4 June - Lewis Bagot, Bishop of St Asaph, 62
- 6 July - Daniel Morgan, American pioneer, soldier, and politician of Welsh parentage, 66
- 28 November - Robert Roberts, preacher, 40
- 30 November - Thomas Williams of Llanidan, industrialist, 65
- 6 December - Roger Kemble, travelling theatre manager, father of Sarah Siddons, 81
- 31 December - Francis Lewis, signatory of the Declaration of American Independence, 80
- date unknown - Abraham Elliot Griffiths, co-founder of Sierra Leone, age unknown

== See also ==
- 1802 in Ireland
