= 1866 in Wales =

- Centuries: 17th; 18th; 19th; 20th; 21st
- Decades: 1840s; 1850s; 1860s; 1870s; 1880s
- See also: List of years in Wales; Timeline of Welsh history 1866 in The United Kingdom Scotland Elsewhere

This article is about the particular significance of the year 1866 to Wales and its people.

== Incumbents ==
- Lord Lieutenant of Anglesey – Henry Paget, 2nd Marquess of Anglesey
- Lord Lieutenant of Brecknockshire – George Pratt, 2nd Marquess Camden (until 8 August) Charles Morgan, 1st Baron Tredegar (from 27 September)
- Lord Lieutenant of Caernarvonshire – Sir Richard Williams-Bulkeley, 10th Baronet (until 14 September); Edward Douglas-Pennant, 1st Baron Penrhyn (from 14 September)
- Lord Lieutenant of Cardiganshire – Edward Pryse
- Lord Lieutenant of Carmarthenshire – John Campbell, 2nd Earl Cawdor
- Lord Lieutenant of Denbighshire – Robert Myddelton Biddulph
- Lord Lieutenant of Flintshire – Sir Stephen Glynne, 9th Baronet
- Lord Lieutenant of Glamorgan – Christopher Rice Mansel Talbot
- Lord Lieutenant of Merionethshire – Edward Lloyd-Mostyn, 2nd Baron Mostyn
- Lord Lieutenant of Monmouthshire – Benjamin Hall, 1st Baron Llanover
- Lord Lieutenant of Montgomeryshire – Sudeley Hanbury-Tracy, 3rd Baron Sudeley
- Lord Lieutenant of Pembrokeshire – William Edwardes, 3rd Baron Kensington
- Lord Lieutenant of Radnorshire – John Walsh, 1st Baron Ormathwaite
- Bishop of Bangor – James Colquhoun Campbell
- Bishop of Llandaff – Alfred Ollivant
- Bishop of St Asaph – Thomas Vowler Short
- Bishop of St Davids – Connop Thirlwall

== Events ==
- 5 February — Railway contractor Thomas Savin goes bankrupt, resulting in a temporary halt in the construction of the Aberystwith and Welsh Coast Railway.
- 31 March — The last public execution in Wales takes place as Robert Coe is hanged in Swansea.
- 1 May — Wrexham, Mold and Connah's Quay Railway opens to passengers.
- July — Launch of Yr Australydd, a Welsh language Calvinistic Methodist newspaper, in Victoria (Australia), edited by William Meirion Evans and Theophilus Williams.
- 5 September — The Pembroke and Tenby Railway is extended for passengers to Whitland.
- 6 September — Six people are killed in a railway derailment near Criccieth.
- September — The song Hen Wlad Fy Nhadau — later to become the official national anthem of Wales — is sung for the first time at the National Eisteddfod held at Chester.
- 17 October — First confirmed death from a cholera epidemic in Carnarvon.
- December — The Talyllyn Railway officially opens.
- Sir George Gilbert Scott begins work on the renovation of Bangor Cathedral.
- The Baptist Union of Wales is established.
- Whiteford Lighthouse on Gower, the only remaining large wave-swept cast-iron lighthouse built in the UK, is first lit.
- Edward Gordon Douglas is created Baron Penrhyn.
- Morris Brothers department store established at Tenby; it will still be trading 150 years later.

== Arts and literature ==
=== Awards ===
- The National Eisteddfod of Wales is held at Chester in England.
  - The harpist William Frost is awarded a pedal harp by Pencerdd Gwalia

=== New books ===
==== English language ====
- Rees Howell Gronow — Last Recollections

==== Welsh language ====
- Richard Davies (Mynyddog) — Caneuon Mynyddog
- Roger Edwards — Y Tri Brawd
- William Rees (Gwilym Hiraethog) — Nodiadau ar yr Epistol at yr Hebreaid

=== Music ===
- John Owen (Owain Alaw) — Gŵyl Gwalia
- John Thomas (Pencerdd Gwalia) — The Bride of Neath Valley (cantata)
- The Eryri Music Festival (Gwyl Gerddorol Eryri) is founded.

== Sport ==
- Cricket — Hawarden Park Cricket Club is founded, reputedly by William Ewart Gladstone.
- Rugby football — First competitive game played in Wales, between college teams at Lampeter.

== Births ==
- 13 January — Frank Hill, Wales international rugby captain (died 1927)
- 21 January — Sir Owen Cox, politician and businessman in Australia (died 1932)
- 22 March — Willie Thomas, Wales international rugby captain (died 1921)
- 1 April — Sir William Henry Hoare Vincent, diplomat (died 1941)
- 18 April — Frederick Llewellyn-Jones, lawyer and politician (died 1941)
- 20 April — Sir John Milsom Rees, laryngologist (died 1952)
- 30 May — John Gruffydd Moelwyn Hughes, minister and poet (died 1944)
- 5 August — Sir Edward Anwyl, Celtic scholar (died 1914)
- 7 August — Charles Granville Bruce, mountaineer (died 1939)
- 13 August - William Finney, cricketer (died 1927)
- 24 August — Caesar Jenkyns, footballer (died 1941)
- 4 October — Robert Jones (Trebor Aled), poet (died 1917)
- 12 October — James Ramsay MacDonald, politician (died 1937)
- 4 November — Sir David William Evans, lawyer, public servant and Wales international rugby player, (died 1926)
- 5 November — Daniel Protheroe, conductor and choirmaster (died 1934)
- 14 November — Tom Morgan Wales international rugby player (died 1899)
- 24 November — Alexander Bland, Wales international rugby player (died 1947)
- 4 December — Dai Lewis (died 1943), rugby union forward who played international rugby for Wales
- 10 December — Stanley L. Wood, illustrator (died 1928
- 15 December — William Williams, Wales national rugby union player (died 1945)
- date unknown — David Delta Evans (Dewi Hiraddug), journalist, author, and Unitarian minister (died 1948)

== Deaths ==
- 16 January — David Owen (Brutus), literary editor, 70
- 27 January — John Gibson, sculptor, 75
- 31 January — Owen Owen Roberts, physician, 73
- 29 March - Thomas Jones (Glan Alun), poet, 55
- 19 May — David Davis, Blaengwawr, industrialist, 69
- 31 August (approx) — Robert Jermain Thomas, missionary (murdered in Korea), 26
- October — Evan Bevan, humorous writer, 42/43
- 16 October — Angharad Llwyd, antiquary, 86
- 27 October — William Rowlands, minister and author active in the USA
- 30 October — George Lort Phillips, MP for Pembrokeshire, 55 (injuries from a fall)
- 1 December (in London) — George Everest, surveyor and geographer, 76

== See also ==
- 1866 in Ireland
