= 1869 in Wales =

- Centuries: 17th; 18th; 19th; 20th; 21st
- Decades: 1840s; 1850s; 1860s; 1870s; 1880s
- See also: List of years in Wales; Timeline of Welsh history 1869 in The United Kingdom Scotland Elsewhere

This article is about the particular significance of the year 1869 to Wales and its people.

== Incumbents ==
- Lord Lieutenant of Anglesey – Henry Paget, 2nd Marquess of Anglesey (until 7 February); William Owen Stanley (from 2 March)
- Lord Lieutenant of Brecknockshire – Charles Morgan, 1st Baron Tredegar
- Lord Lieutenant of Caernarvonshire – Edward Douglas-Pennant, 1st Baron Penrhyn
- Lord Lieutenant of Cardiganshire – Edward Pryse
- Lord Lieutenant of Carmarthenshire – John Campbell, 2nd Earl Cawdor
- Lord Lieutenant of Denbighshire – Robert Myddelton Biddulph
- Lord Lieutenant of Flintshire – Sir Stephen Glynne, 9th Baronet
- Lord Lieutenant of Glamorgan – Christopher Rice Mansel Talbot
- Lord Lieutenant of Merionethshire – Edward Lloyd-Mostyn, 2nd Baron Mostyn
- Lord Lieutenant of Monmouthshire – Henry Somerset, 8th Duke of Beaufort
- Lord Lieutenant of Montgomeryshire – Sudeley Hanbury-Tracy, 3rd Baron Sudeley
- Lord Lieutenant of Pembrokeshire – William Edwardes, 3rd Baron Kensington
- Lord Lieutenant of Radnorshire – John Walsh, 1st Baron Ormathwaite
- Bishop of Bangor – James Colquhoun Campbell
- Bishop of Llandaff – Alfred Ollivant
- Bishop of St Asaph – Thomas Vowler Short
- Bishop of St Davids – Connop Thirlwall

== Events ==
- January
  - Henry Austin Bruce becomes MP for Renfrewshire.
  - Timothy Richards Lewis goes to India to study cholera.
- 1 May – The Western Mail is published for the first time.
- 19 May – Two days after John Young, the English manager of the Leeswood Green colliery, announces a pay cut, he is attacked by some of his workers.
- 2 June – Seven men are tried at Mold for attacking John Young. A riot breaks out as those convicted are being transported to the railway station; soldiers fire on the crowd, killing four people.
- 10 June
  - 53 men and boys are killed in the second underground explosion within two years at Ferndale Colliery in the Rhondda.
  - Three people are killed in a train derailment at Maesycwmmer in Glamorgan.
- August – Anti-Irish riots at Pontlottyn in the Rhymney Valley result in one death.
- 1 September – The Dyserth branch line is opened for goods traffic.
- 30 October – The first edition of the Welsh-language periodical Y Goleuad is published.
- unknown date
  - Landore steelworks at Swansea established by Carl Wilhelm Siemens.
  - John Hughes of Merthyr Tydfil buys land near the Sea of Azov, where he develops an ironworks and founds the city of Yuzovka (later Donetsk).
  - Joseph Leycester Lyne (Father Ignatius of Jesus) acquires land at Capel-y-ffin and begins construction of an Anglican Benedictine community, Llanthony Abbey.
  - Construction of the fort at St Catherine's Island, off Tenby.
  - Prehistoric burial remains are discovered at Parc le Breos on the Gower Peninsula.
  - John Owen of Tyn-llwyn is evicted from his farm for voting Tory.

== Arts and literature ==
=== Awards ===
- The first official National Eisteddfod of Wales takes place at Holywell.

=== New books ===
- J. H. Clark – History of Monmouthshire
- John Hugh Evans – Pryddest Goffa i Thomas Aubrey
- Jane Hughes – Galargan am y diweddar Barch. Henry Rees, Liverpool
- David Watkin Jones (Dafydd Morgannwg) – Yr Ysgol Farddol
- Nathaniel Jones (Cynhafal) – Elias y Thesbiad
- John Petherick – Travels in Central Africa and Explorations of the Western Nile Tributaries
- William Rowlands – Llyfryddiaeth y Cymry (Bibliography of the Welsh) (posthumous; ed. Daniel Silvan Evans)
- Jane Williams (Ysgafell) – A History of Wales derived from Authentic Sources
- Robert Williams (Trebor Mai) – Y Geninen

=== Music ===
- Owen Jones – Hymnau Hen a Diweddar (collection of hymns)

== Sport ==
- Football – Ruabon footballers set up a club at Plas Madoc.
- Mountaineering – Emmeline Lewis Lloyd attempts an ascent of the Matterhorn.

== Births ==
- 11 January – Ralph Sweet-Escott, English born, Wales rugby international (died 1907)
- 9 April – John Hugh Edwards, politician (died 1945)
- 19 May – John Henry Williams, Welsh politician (died 1936)
- 20 May – Robert Griffith Berry, minister and writer (died 1945)
- 30 May – Thomas Rees, theologian (died 1926)
- 12 August – Fred Parfitt, Wales international rugby player (died 1953)
- 6 September – Walford Davies, composer (died 1944)
- 24 September – Maud Cunnington, archaeologist (died 1951)
- 29 October – Bill Morris, Wales international rugby player (died 1946)
- 9 November – Osbert Fynes-Clinton, dialectologist (died 1941)
- 15 November – Percy Bennett, Wales international rugby player (died 1936)
- 20 November – Herbert Tudor Buckland, architect working in Birmingham (died 1951)

== Deaths ==
- 23 March – William Williams (Caledfryn), poet, 68
- 31 March – David Rees (Y Cynhyrfwr), Nonconformist leader and author, 67
- 16 April – James Davies (Iago ap Dewi), poet, 68
- 1 July – David Jones, banker and politician, 58
- 14 July – Lloyd Kenyon, 3rd Baron Kenyon, 64
- 26 August – William Williams (Creuddynfab), 55
- October – John Jones (Talhaiarn), poet, 59 (suicide)
- 7 October – George Rice-Trevor, 4th Baron Dynevor, politician, 74
- 9 November – Harriet Windsor-Clive, 13th Baroness Windsor, philanthropist,
- 15 December – David Williams, politician, 70
- 17 December – Sarah Jacob, "the fasting girl", 12

== See also ==
- 1869 in Ireland
