= 1886 in Wales =

- Centuries: 17th; 18th; 19th; 20th; 21st
- Decades: 1860s; 1870s; 1880s; 1890s; 1900s
- See also: List of years in Wales; Timeline of Welsh history 1886 in The United Kingdom Scotland Elsewhere

This article is about the particular significance of the year 1886 to Wales and its people.

== Incumbents ==
- Lord Lieutenant of Anglesey – Richard Davies
- Lord Lieutenant of Brecknockshire – Joseph Bailey, 1st Baron Glanusk
- Lord Lieutenant of Caernarvonshire – Edward Douglas-Pennant, 1st Baron Penrhyn (until 31 March); John Ernest Greaves (from 17 May)
- Lord Lieutenant of Cardiganshire – Edward Pryse
- Lord Lieutenant of Carmarthenshire – John Campbell, 2nd Earl Cawdor
- Lord Lieutenant of Denbighshire – William Cornwallis-West
- Lord Lieutenant of Flintshire – Hugh Robert Hughes
- Lord Lieutenant of Glamorgan – Christopher Rice Mansel Talbot
- Lord Lieutenant of Merionethshire – Robert Davies Pryce
- Lord Lieutenant of Monmouthshire – Henry Somerset, 8th Duke of Beaufort
- Lord Lieutenant of Montgomeryshire – Edward Herbert, 3rd Earl of Powis
- Lord Lieutenant of Pembrokeshire – William Edwardes, 4th Baron Kensington
- Lord Lieutenant of Radnorshire – Arthur Walsh, 2nd Baron Ormathwaite
- Bishop of Bangor – James Colquhoun Campbell
- Bishop of Llandaff – Richard Lewis
- Bishop of St Asaph – Joshua Hughes
- Bishop of St Davids – Basil Jones
- Archdruid of the National Eisteddfod of Wales – Clwydfardd

== Events ==
- 9 June – Soprano Adelina Patti marries tenor Ernesto Nicolini in south Wales.
- 1 September – The Great Western Railway opens the Severn Tunnel to regular goods and mineral traffic (and to passengers on 1 December).
- September – Opening of the Llandudno Pier Pavilion Theatre.
- 15 October
  - 20 people are drowned when the sailing ship Malleny is wrecked on Tusker Rocks, Porthcawl.
  - 18 people are drowned when the sailing ship Teviotdale is wrecked on Cefn Sidan Sands in Carmarthenshire.
- 16 October
  - Statue of the Liberal politician John Batchelor unveiled in Cardiff
- November
  - Serious flooding in Aberystwyth.
  - The keeper of the Mumbles lighthouse is swept out to sea and drowned.
  - The rivers Mawddach, Dee and Taff all flood.
- unknown dates
  - Cantref Reservoir on the Taff Fawr is completed.
  - Opening of the Cardiff Stock Exchange.
  - Cymru Fydd is founded by the Liberal Party to further the cause of home rule.
  - The Welsh Land League is founded.
  - Beginning of the tithe revolt in Denbighshire.
  - The corporation of the Borough of Holt is dissolved.
  - Japanese knotweed is recorded at Maesteg - the first record of it growing wild in the UK.

== Arts and literature ==
=== Awards ===
National Eisteddfod of Wales – held at Caernarfon

- Chair – Richard Davies, "Gobaith"
- Crown – John Cadfan Davies

=== New books ===
- Rhoda Broughton – Doctor Cupid

=== Music ===
- William Owen "of Prysgol" – Y Perl Cerddorol yn cynnwys tonau ac anthemau, cysegredig a moesol (sol-fa edition)

== Sport ==
- Football – Druids win the Welsh Cup for the fifth time in its nine-year history.
- Rugby union – Abercynon RFC and Treorchy RFC are founded.

== Births ==
- 3 March – Jack Jones, Wales international rugby player (died 1951)
- 4 March – Rowland Griffiths, Wales international rugby player (died 1914)
- 5 March
  - Paul Radmilovic, competitive swimmer, four-time Olympic gold medal winner (died 1968)
  - Freddie Welsh, né Thomas, World lightweight boxing champion (died 1927 in the United States)
- 14 March – David Watts, Wales international rugby union player (died 1916)
- 16 March – James Llewellyn Davies, VC winner (died 1917)
- 3 May – Morgan Jones, politician (died 1939)
- 4 May – Olive Wheeler, educationalist (died 1963)
- 6 June – John Morgan, Archbishop of Wales (died 1957)
- 17 June – David Brunt, meteorologist (died 1965)
- 11 July – Ernest Willows, aviation pioneer (died 1926)
- 13 July – Huw Menai (Huw Owen Williams), poet (died 1961)
- 22 September – Bill Perry, Welsh international rugby player (died 1970)
- 29 September – Jack Williams, VC recipient (died 1953)
- 9 November (probably) – S. O. Davies, politician (died 1972)
- 10 November – Fred Birt, Wales international rugby union player (died 1956)
- 22 December – David James Jones, philosopher and academic (died 1947)

== Deaths ==
- 28 February – John Jones, politician, 73
- 12 March – Edward Arthur Somerset, politician, 69
- 31 March – Edward Douglas-Pennant, 1st Baron Penrhyn, 85
- 7 May – Timothy Richards Lewis, surgeon and pathologist, 44
- 9 June – Edward Williams, iron-master, 60)
- 9 July – Roger Edwards, minister and writer, 75
- 13 October – John Prichard, architect, 69
- 29 October – Evan Evans, ("Evans Bach Nantyglo"), minister, 82

== See also ==
- 1886 in Ireland
