= 1868 in Wales =

- Centuries: 17th; 18th; 19th; 20th; 21st
- Decades: 1840s; 1850s; 1860s; 1870s; 1880s
- See also: List of years in Wales; Timeline of Welsh history 1868 in The United Kingdom Scotland Elsewhere

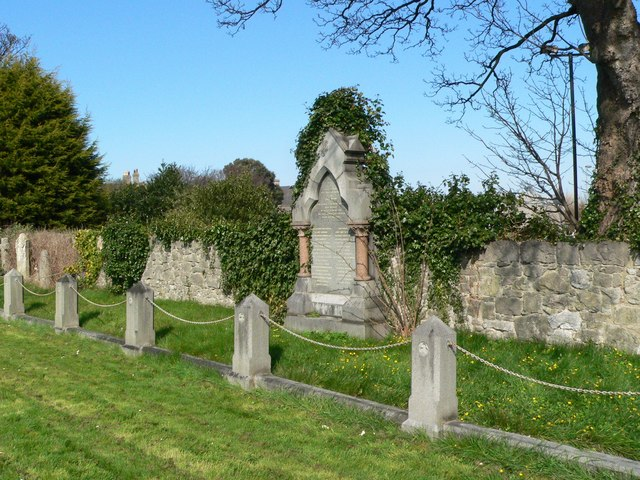
The 1868 Rail Disaster Memorial, near Abergele, Conwy County, Wales.

This article is about the particular significance of the year 1868 to Wales and its people.

== Incumbents ==
- Lord Lieutenant of Anglesey – Henry Paget, 2nd Marquess of Anglesey
- Lord Lieutenant of Brecknockshire – Charles Morgan, 1st Baron Tredegar
- Lord Lieutenant of Caernarvonshire – Edward Douglas-Pennant, 1st Baron Penrhyn (from 14 September)
- Lord Lieutenant of Cardiganshire – Edward Pryse
- Lord Lieutenant of Carmarthenshire – John Campbell, 2nd Earl Cawdor
- Lord Lieutenant of Denbighshire – Robert Myddelton Biddulph
- Lord Lieutenant of Flintshire – Sir Stephen Glynne, 9th Baronet
- Lord Lieutenant of Glamorgan – Christopher Rice Mansel Talbot
- Lord Lieutenant of Merionethshire – Edward Lloyd-Mostyn, 2nd Baron Mostyn
- Lord Lieutenant of Monmouthshire – Henry Somerset, 8th Duke of Beaufort
- Lord Lieutenant of Montgomeryshire – Sudeley Hanbury-Tracy, 3rd Baron Sudeley
- Lord Lieutenant of Pembrokeshire – William Edwardes, 3rd Baron Kensington
- Lord Lieutenant of Radnorshire – John Walsh, 1st Baron Ormathwaite
- Bishop of Bangor – James Colquhoun Campbell
- Bishop of Llandaff – Alfred Ollivant
- Bishop of St Asaph – Thomas Vowler Short
- Bishop of St Davids – Connop Thirlwall

== Events ==
- 13 January – The brig Albion runs aground off Whitford Point and is abandoned by her seven crew members, all of whom drown.
- 22 January – Sixteen vessels are lost in a gale off the Burry estuary, with a total of thirty lives lost.
- 1 February – At the bridge over the Severn at Caersws an approach embankment, damaged by flood water, collapses under a train. The driver and fireman are killed.
- July – Pastor Karl Herman Lunde begins fund-raising for the new Norwegian Seamen's Church in Cardiff.
- 4 August – Opening of the Bala and Dolgelly Railway, completing the Ruabon to Barmouth Line via Corwen and alongside Bala Lake.
- 20 August – Abergele rail disaster: 33 people die in a fire resulting from a collision between a mail train and a set of trucks at Llandulas station near Abergele, the greatest loss of life in a railway accident in Wales.
- October – Work begins on Nant-y-Ffrith reservoir.
- 2 December – The United Kingdom general election leaves Gladstone's Liberals the dominant party in Wales, with 21 seats.
  - Among the Conservative members who lose their seats are Crawshay Bailey and Henry Austin Bruce, the latter replaced by two MPs for the expanded constituency of Merthyr Tydfil: Richard Fothergill and Henry Richard.
  - Richard Davies becomes MP for Anglesey.
  - Love Jones-Parry wins Caernarvonshire from Douglas Pennant.
  - George Osborne Morgan is elected for the first time in Denbighshire, winning the seat from the lord lieutenant, Robert Myddelton Biddulph.
  - Farmers in Cardiganshire are evicted for returning a Liberal MP, Thomas Lloyd.
- John Crichton-Stuart, 3rd Marquess of Bute, sponsors restoration work at Caerphilly Castle.
- English manufacturer Frederick Walton, the inventor of linoleum, takes up residence on his father's Cwmllecoediog Estate near Aberangell, whose development he begins.
- First publication of the Welsh-language periodical, Baner America, in the USA.
- Y Dydd is founded, with Samuel Roberts (S. R.) as editor.
- Iron Age crannog is discovered on an island in Llangorse Lake, near Brecon.

== Arts and literature ==
=== Awards ===
- National Eisteddfod of Wales is held at Ruthin.

=== New books ===
==== English language ====
- William Forbes Skene – The Four Ancient Books of Wales

==== Welsh language ====
- Robert Elis (Cynddelw) – Geiriadur Cymreig Cymraeg
- John Ceiriog Hughes – Oriau eraill
- Jabez Edmund Jenkins – Rhiangerdd – Gwenfron o'r Dyffryn
- Griffith Jones (Glan Menai) – Enwogion Sir Aberteifi
- Rhys Gwesyn Jones – Caru, Priodi, a Byw
- John Phillips (Tegidon) – Y Ddeilen ar y Traeth

=== Music ===
- William Lewis Barrett is appointed flautist at the Italian Opera of Lutz.
- Gŵyl Ardudwy music festival is founded by John Roberts (Ieuan Gwyllt).
- Publication of Llyfr Tonau ac Emynau, edited by Edward Stephen (Tanymarian) and Joseph David Jones.

== Sport ==
- Cricket
  - May – A team from Cadoxton play the United South of England (including W. G. Grace) at The Gnoll, Neath.

== Births ==
- 13 April (in Birkenhead) – Caradoc Rees, politician (d. 1924)
- 29 May – Sydney Nicholls, Wales rugby international player (d. 1946)
- 10 June
  - John Jones (Ioan Brothen), poet (d. 1940)
  - David Prosser, bishop (d. 1950)
- 2 August – Sir Alfred Edward Lewis, banker (d. 1940)
- 28 August – Thomas Charles Williams, minister (d. 1927)
- 28 November – Arthur Linton, cyclist (d. 1896)
- 30 November – Ernest Newman, English-born music critic of Welsh parentage (d. 1959)
- 29 December – William Owen Jones (Eos y Gogledd), musician (d. 1928)
- date unknown
  - Roger Doughty, English-born footballer of Welsh maternity (d. 1914)
  - David Matthews, politician (d. 1960)

== Deaths ==
- 13 January – John Parry, Mormon convert, 79
- 25 April – Sarah Williams, English novelist of Welsh parentage, 30
- 22 June – Owain Meirion, poet, 65
- 3 August – Edward Welch, architect, 61/62
- 17 August – William Nevill, 4th Earl of Abergavenny, 76
- 11 September – Maria James, poet, 74
- 16 September – John Vaughan, English ironmaster, 68
- 24 November – Sir John Dorney Harding, lawyer, 59
- date unknown – Dafydd Jones (Dewi Dywyll), balladeer (born 1803)

== See also ==
- 1868 in Ireland
