= 1888 in Wales =

- Centuries: 17th; 18th; 19th; 20th; 21st
- Decades: 1860s; 1870s; 1880s; 1890s; 1900s
- See also: List of years in Wales; Timeline of Welsh history 1888 in The United Kingdom Scotland Elsewhere

This article is about the particular significance of the year 1888 to Wales and its people.

== Incumbents ==
- Lord Lieutenant of Anglesey – Richard Davies
- Lord Lieutenant of Brecknockshire – Joseph Bailey, 1st Baron Glanusk
- Lord Lieutenant of Caernarvonshire – John Ernest Greaves
- Lord Lieutenant of Cardiganshire – Edward Pryse (until 29 May); Herbert Davies-Evans (from 16 July)
- Lord Lieutenant of Carmarthenshire – John Campbell, 2nd Earl Cawdor
- Lord Lieutenant of Denbighshire – William Cornwallis-West
- Lord Lieutenant of Flintshire – Hugh Robert Hughes
- Lord Lieutenant of Glamorgan – Christopher Rice Mansel Talbot
- Lord Lieutenant of Merionethshire – Robert Davies Pryce
- Lord Lieutenant of Monmouthshire – Henry Somerset, 8th Duke of Beaufort
- Lord Lieutenant of Montgomeryshire – Edward Herbert, 3rd Earl of Powis
- Lord Lieutenant of Pembrokeshire – William Edwardes, 4th Baron Kensington
- Lord Lieutenant of Radnorshire – Arthur Walsh, 2nd Baron Ormathwaite
- Bishop of Bangor – James Colquhoun Campbell
- Bishop of Llandaff – Richard Lewis
- Bishop of St Asaph – Joshua Hughes
- Bishop of St Davids – Basil Jones
- Archdruid of the National Eisteddfod of Wales – Clwydfardd

== Events ==
- January – Plans are presented for a Welsh Presbyterian Chapel in Charing Cross Road, London.
- March – Construction work begins on the Dowlais steelworks at East Moors, Cardiff.
- 11 April - Earthquake centred on Corwen.
- May – Owen Glynne Jones climbs Cadair Idris by the east ridge of the Cyfrwy.
- 13 May – The young Beatrix Potter records a trip to Machynlleth in her diary.
- 14 May – Five miners are killed in an accident at the Aber Colliery, Porth, Rhondda.
- August – Joshua Hughes, Bishop of St Asaph, has a seizure while staying in Scotland, and is paralysed until his death a few months later.
- 27 September – A new dock at Milford Haven is opened.
- 5 October – Five sailors are drowned at Colwyn Bay while returning to their ship by boat.
- date unknown
  - University of Wales, Bangor, opens its agriculture department – the first in a British university.
  - The Welsh Parliamentary Liberal Party is formed.
  - Henry Morton Stanley "discovers" Lake Edward and names it after the Prince of Wales.
  - R. J. Lloyd Price opens a whisky distillery at Frongoch.
  - The remains of Llantwit Major Roman Villa are discovered.

== Arts and literature ==
=== Awards ===
National Eisteddfod of Wales – held at Wrexham

- Chair – Thomas Tudno Jones, "Peroriaeth"
- Crown – Howell Elvet Lewis, "Y Sabath yng Nghymru"

=== New books ===
- Daniel Owen – Y Siswrn
- J. Rhys – Lectures of the Origin and Growth of Religion as Illustrated by Celtic

=== Music ===
- William Griffith – "I Will Extol Thee"

== Sport ==
- Cricket – Glamorgan County Cricket Club founded.
- Golf – Tenby Links becomes the first golf course in Wales. The first competition held by the club is held on 25 October over 9 holes and is won by Mr T A Rees.
- Rugby union
  - Briton Ferry RFC, Builth Wells RFC, Llantrisant RFC, Newbridge RFC and Tonna RFC are founded.
  - Willie Thomas is the only Welsh international to take part in the first overseas tour by a British rugby union team.
  - Wales win their first international game against Scotland, during the 1888 Home Nations Championship.
  - Wales face their first international opposition, the New Zealand Native football team. Wales win by a goal to nil.

== Births ==
- February – Grace Wynne Griffith, novelist (died 1963)
- 23 March – Fred Hando, writer and artist (died 1970)
- 29 April – Fred Dyer, boxer and baritone singer (died after 1934)
- 14 May – Nansi Richards, harpist (died 1979)
- 21 May – William Cove, politician (died 1963)
- 24 May – Howell Lewis, Wales international rugby player (died 1971)
- 18 June – Margaret Lindsay Williams, artist (died 1960)
- 16 August – T. E. Lawrence, writer and war hero (died 1935)
- 24 August – Valentine Baker, pilot and war hero (died 1942)
- 5 September – Rhys Hopkin Morris, politician (died 1956)
- 7 October – Frances Stevenson, secretary and later wife of David Lloyd George (died 1972)
- 19 October – Peter Freeman, politician (died 1956)
- 27 November – Ezer Griffiths, physicist (died 1962)
- 29 December – Reg Plummer, Wales and British Lion rugby union player (died 1953)

== Deaths ==
- 23 February – Evan Davies (Myfyr Morganwg), poet and archdruid, 87
- 29 February – Thomas Price, Baptist minister and author, 67
- 7 March – Hugh Hughes (Cadfan), Patagonian colonist, 63
- 16 March – Thomas Thomas, chapel architect and minister, c. 81
- 22 March – Henry Robertson, Scottish engineer and founder of Brymbo Steel Works, 72
- 24 March – Benjamin Piercy, civil engineer, 61
- 29 May – Edward Pryse, politician, 70
- 7 June – Charles William Nevill, industrialist and politician, 72
- 2 August – David Davies (Dewi Emlyn), poet, 70
- 5 August – Charles Octavius Swinnerton Morgan, politician, historian and antiquary, 84
- 20 August – Henry Richard, politician and peace campaigner, 76
- 3 September – Robert H. Roberts, Welsh-born US senator, 51 (boatyard accident)
- 20 September – Elias Owen, footballer, 35 (suicide)
- 23 November – Edward John Sartoris, politician, 74/75
- date unknown
  - John Evans (Y Bardd Cocos), poet
  - Morgan Morgans, mining engineer, 73/4

== See also ==
- 1888 in Ireland
