= 1887 in Wales =

- Centuries: 17th; 18th; 19th; 20th; 21st
- Decades: 1860s; 1870s; 1880s; 1890s; 1900s
- See also: List of years in Wales; Timeline of Welsh history 1887 in The United Kingdom Scotland Elsewhere

This article is about the particular significance of the year 1887 to Wales and its people.

== Incumbents ==
- Lord Lieutenant of Anglesey – Richard Davies
- Lord Lieutenant of Brecknockshire – Joseph Bailey, 1st Baron Glanusk
- Lord Lieutenant of Caernarvonshire – John Ernest Greaves
- Lord Lieutenant of Cardiganshire – Herbert Davies-Evans
- Lord Lieutenant of Carmarthenshire – John Campbell, 2nd Earl Cawdor
- Lord Lieutenant of Denbighshire – William Cornwallis-West
- Lord Lieutenant of Flintshire – Hugh Robert Hughes
- Lord Lieutenant of Glamorgan – Christopher Rice Mansel Talbot
- Lord Lieutenant of Merionethshire – Robert Davies Pryce
- Lord Lieutenant of Monmouthshire – Henry Somerset, 8th Duke of Beaufort
- Lord Lieutenant of Montgomeryshire – Edward Herbert, 3rd Earl of Powis
- Lord Lieutenant of Pembrokeshire – William Edwardes, 4th Baron Kensington
- Lord Lieutenant of Radnorshire – Arthur Walsh, 2nd Baron Ormathwaite
- Bishop of Bangor – James Colquhoun Campbell
- Bishop of Llandaff – Richard Lewis
- Bishop of St Asaph – Joshua Hughes
- Bishop of St Davids – Basil Jones
- Archdruid of the National Eisteddfod of Wales – Clwydfardd

== Events ==
- 18 February – 39 miners are killed in an accident at Standard Colliery, Ynyshir.
- June – The Riot Act is read at Mochdre in the Vale of Clwyd at the height of a "Tithe War".
- 24 May – The new Cardiff Metropolitan Cathedral, designed by Pugin, is opened.
- 24 August – Roath Dock opened in Cardiff Docks; the first sod of Roath Park is dug.
- 1 November – The Helvetia wrecked off Worms Head, Rhossili (remains can still be seen at low tide).
- The Turner House Gallery, Penarth, is built to house the art collection of Major James Pyke Thompson.
- Opening of Wrexham School of Science and Art, predecessor of Wrexham Glyndŵr University.
- Lewis Llewelyn Dillwyn and Stuart Rendel affirm the Welsh Liberal Party's support of Irish Home Rule.
- Richard John Lloyd Price establishes a Welsh whisky distillery on his Rhiwlas estate at Frongoch.

== Arts and literature ==
=== Awards ===
National Eisteddfod of Wales – held at London

- Chair – Robert Arthur Williams, "Y Frenhines Victoria"
- Crown – John Cadfan Davies, "John Penry"

=== New books ===
==== English language ====
- Amy Dillwyn – Jill and Jack
- Daniel Silvan Evans – Dictionary of the Welsh Language (Geiriadur Cymraeg)

==== Welsh language ====
- Owen Evans – Geiriau Olaf Iesu Grist
- Thomas Levi – Crist a Gwroniaid y Byd Paganaidd
- The Text of the Mabinogion and Other Welsh Tales from the Red Book of Hergest (edited by John Gwenogvryn Evans)

=== Music ===
- John Thomas (Pencerdd Gwalia) – Cambria’s Homage to our Empress Queen

== Sport ==
- Football
  - Chirk win the Welsh Cup for the first time.
  - Knighton Town F.C. is founded.
- Rugby union
  - Ammanford RFC, Caerphilly RFC, Mumbles RFC, Newport RFC, Pontyclun RFC and Taffs Well RFC are established.
  - Wales play their first international in Llanelli; though the original venue of Stradey Park is moved to a local cricket pitch due to a frozen pitch.

== Births ==
- 13 January – Hedd Wyn, poet (died 1917)
- 27 February – James Dickson Innes, landscape painter (died 1914)
- 23 March – Percy Jones, Wales international rugby player (died 1969)
- 19 April – Bertrand Turnbull, Olympic hockey player (died 1943)
- 23 April – Len Trump, Wales international rugby player (died 1948)
- 13 July – Elizabeth Watkin-Jones, children's author (died 1966)
- 21 September – T. H. Parry-Williams, poet, author and academic (died 1975)
- 11 October – William Davies, national librarian (died 1952)
- 29 December – Jack Wetter, Wales international rugby union captain (died 1967)
- date unknown
  - Bessie Jones, singer (died 1974)
  - Artie Moore, wireless operator (died 1949)

== Deaths ==
- 25 January – Rowland Prichard, musician, 76
- 16 February – Richard Owen, preacher, 47
- 24 March – William Lucas Collins, priest and writer, 71
- 11 April – Samuel Bowen, Independent minister, 87
- 23 April – John Ceiriog Hughes, poet, 54
- 3 May – Robert Vivian, infantry officer, illegitimate member of the Vivian family, 84/5
- 21 May – Horace Jones, English architect who designed Cardiff Town Hall
- 28 May – Dan Isaac Davies, educationist, 48
- 19 July – Lewis Edwards, educationist, 77
- 1 August – Hugh Cholmondeley, 2nd Baron Delamere, politician, 75
- 11 August – Sir Richard Green-Price, 1st Baronet, politician, 83
- 7 November – Joshua T. Owen, Welsh-born educator, politician, and soldier in the Union army during the American Civil War, 66

== See also ==
- 1887 in Ireland
