= 1867 in Wales =

- Centuries: 17th; 18th; 19th; 20th; 21st
- Decades: 1840s; 1850s; 1860s; 1870s; 1880s
- See also: List of years in Wales; Timeline of Welsh history 1867 in The United Kingdom Scotland Elsewhere

This article is about the particular significance of the year 1867 to Wales and its people.

== Incumbents ==
- Lord Lieutenant of Anglesey – Henry Paget, 2nd Marquess of Anglesey
- Lord Lieutenant of Brecknockshire – Charles Morgan, 1st Baron Tredegar
- Lord Lieutenant of Caernarvonshire – Edward Douglas-Pennant, 1st Baron Penrhyn
- Lord Lieutenant of Cardiganshire – Edward Pryse
- Lord Lieutenant of Carmarthenshire – John Campbell, 2nd Earl Cawdor
- Lord Lieutenant of Denbighshire – Robert Myddelton Biddulph
- Lord Lieutenant of Flintshire – Sir Stephen Glynne, 9th Baronet
- Lord Lieutenant of Glamorgan – Christopher Rice Mansel Talbot
- Lord Lieutenant of Merionethshire – Edward Lloyd-Mostyn, 2nd Baron Mostyn
- Lord Lieutenant of Monmouthshire – Benjamin Hall, 1st Baron Llanover (until 27 April); Henry Somerset, 8th Duke of Beaufort (from 21 May)
- Lord Lieutenant of Montgomeryshire – Sudeley Hanbury-Tracy, 3rd Baron Sudeley
- Lord Lieutenant of Pembrokeshire – William Edwardes, 3rd Baron Kensington
- Lord Lieutenant of Radnorshire – John Walsh, 1st Baron Ormathwaite
- Bishop of Bangor – James Colquhoun Campbell
- Bishop of Llandaff – Alfred Ollivant
- Bishop of St Asaph – Thomas Vowler Short
- Bishop of St Davids – Connop Thirlwall

== Events ==
- 3 June – The opening of the Anglesey Central Railway to passenger traffic links Amlwch to the rail network for the first time.
- 19 August – The Victoria pier at Rhyl, built at a cost of £23,000, opens to the public.
- 2 September – The Carnarvonshire Railway opens throughout, connecting Carnarvon and Portmadoc.
- 30 September – Mawddwy Railway opens.
- 10 October – Barmouth Bridge across the Mawddach estuary opens to rail traffic, linking Barmouth to the rail network for the first time.
- 26–27 October – Barque Earl of Chester is wrecked off Rhosneigr, Anglesey, with the loss of at least 17 lives.
- 8 November – 178 miners are killed in an accident at Ferndale Colliery, Rhondda.
- date unknown
  - Celtic Congress held at Saint-Brieuc in Brittany.
  - The Bronze Age cairns at Llanmadoc Hill are excavated and finds recorded.

== Arts and literature ==
=== Awards ===
- At the National Eisteddfod of Wales held at Carmarthen, a crown is presented for the first time.

=== New books ===
- Rhoda Broughton – Cometh Up as a Flower
- Edward Hamer – The Chartist Outbreak at Llanidloes
- Jabez Edmund Jenkins – Egin Awen, yn cynnwys awdlau, cywyddau
- Charles Octavius Swinnerton Morgan - Penhow Castle
- William Thomas (Islwyn) – Caniadau
- Alfred Russel Wallace – The Malay Archipelago
- Charles Wilkins – The History of Merthyr Tydfil

=== Music ===
- David Roberts (Alawydd) – Llyfr y Psalmau

== Sport ==
- Boxing – The "Marquess of Queensberry rules", formulated by John Graham Chambers, are published.

== Births ==
- 10 March
  - Sir William James Thomas, 1st baronet, philanthropist, one of the Thomas baronets of Yapton (d. 1945)
  - William Llewelyn Williams, politician (d. 1922)
- 10 April – Courtenay Morgan, 1st Viscount Tredegar, peer (d. 1934)
- 2 May – Eliseus Williams (Eifion Wyn), poet (d. 1926)
- 13 May – Frank Brangwyn, artist (d. 1956)
- 15 May – Sir Henry Stuart Jones, academic (d. 1939)
- 21 May – John Thomas Job, poet (d. 1938)
- 26 May – Mary of Teck, member of the British royal family, Princess of Wales 1901–1910 (d. 1953)
- 29 September – John Richard Williams (J.R. Tryfanwy), poet (d. 1924)
- 6 October – Rosser Evans, Wales international rugby player
- 12 October – Lyn Harding, actor (d. 1952)
- 2 November – Owen Glynne Jones, mountaineer (d. 1899)
- 28 November – James Richard Atkin, judge (born in Australia) (d. 1944)
- 18 December – David Watts Morgan, Member of Parliament for Rhondda East (d. 1933)
- date unknown
  - Mia Arnesby Brown, born Mia Sarah H. Edwards, painter of children's portraits (d. 1931)
  - Fred Hutchinson, rugby player (d. 1941)

== Deaths ==
- 15 February – Walter Coffin, industrialist, 82
- 18 February – Edward Roberts (Iorwerth Glan Aled), poet, 48
- 27 April – Benjamin Hall, 1st Baron Llanover, industrialist, 64
- 26 May – Thomas Phillips, politician and businessman, 65/66
- 4 August – William Crawshay II, industrialist, 79
- 9 September – John Propert, physician, 74
- 12 September – Robert Fulke Greville, landowner and politician, 67
- 16 November – Thomas Aubrey, Methodist minister, 59
- 1 December – William Thomas, Guardian of Aborigines in Australia, 74

== See also ==
- 1867 in Ireland
