= 1885 in Wales =

- Centuries: 17th; 18th; 19th; 20th; 21st
- Decades: 1860s; 1870s; 1880s; 1890s; 1900s
- See also: List of years in Wales; Timeline of Welsh history 1885 in The United Kingdom Scotland Elsewhere

This article is about the particular significance of the year 1885 to Wales and its people.

== Incumbents ==
- Lord Lieutenant of Anglesey – Richard Davies
- Lord Lieutenant of Brecknockshire – Joseph Bailey, 1st Baron Glanusk
- Lord Lieutenant of Caernarvonshire – Edward Douglas-Pennant, 1st Baron Penrhyn
- Lord Lieutenant of Cardiganshire – Edward Pryse
- Lord Lieutenant of Carmarthenshire – John Campbell, 2nd Earl Cawdor
- Lord Lieutenant of Denbighshire – William Cornwallis-West
- Lord Lieutenant of Flintshire – Hugh Robert Hughes
- Lord Lieutenant of Glamorgan – Christopher Rice Mansel Talbot
- Lord Lieutenant of Merionethshire – Robert Davies Pryce
- Lord Lieutenant of Monmouthshire – Henry Somerset, 8th Duke of Beaufort
- Lord Lieutenant of Montgomeryshire – Edward Herbert, 3rd Earl of Powis
- Lord Lieutenant of Pembrokeshire – William Edwardes, 4th Baron Kensington
- Lord Lieutenant of Radnorshire – Arthur Walsh, 2nd Baron Ormathwaite
- Bishop of Bangor – James Colquhoun Campbell
- Bishop of Llandaff – Richard Lewis
- Bishop of St Asaph – Joshua Hughes
- Bishop of St Davids – Basil Jones
- Archdruid of the National Eisteddfod of Wales – Clwydfardd

== Events ==
- October – Keswick House, predecessor of Aberdare Hall, in Cardiff opens, allowing women to study for degrees through the University College of South Wales and Monmouthshire.
- 24 November – The United Kingdom general election is the first in which the Liberal Party has a candidate in every Welsh constituency. The Liberals win 30 of the 34 available seats.
- 23 December – 81 miners are killed in an accident at the Maerdy Colliery, Rhondda.
- The world's first passenger-carrying ropeway comes into use over the River Aeron at Aberaeron.
- Opening of steelworks at Brymbo.
- By order of the Admiralty, only Welsh coal is to be used on ships of the Royal Navy.
- Three people are killed when fire breaks out at the University of Wales, Aberystwyth.
- Frances Hoggan is the first woman doctor registered in Wales.
- Opening of the first local authority secondary school in Cardiff.
- Under the Redistribution of Seats Act 1885, the constituencies of Denbighshire, Glamorganshire, North and South Monmouthshire are among those disestablished.

== Arts and literature ==
=== Awards ===
National Eisteddfod of Wales – held at Aberdare

- Chair – Watkin Hezekiah Williams, "Y Gwir yn Erbyn y Byd"
- Crown – Griffith Tecwyn Parry

=== New books ===
- Daniel James (Gwyrosydd) – Caneuon Gwyrosydd
- Daniel Owen – Hunangofiant Rhys Lewis, Gweinidog Bethel, the first long novel written in Welsh

=== Music ===
- 5 August – Queen Victoria's harpist John Thomas (Pencerdd Gwalia) marries a former student, Joan Francis Denny.

== Sport ==
- Football – Druids win the Welsh Cup for the fourth time in its eight-year history.
- Golf – Course at Borth opens.
- Rugby union
  - Cross Keys RFC, London Welsh RFC, Neyland RFC and Risca RFC are founded.
  - Arthur Gould plays his first international match for Wales.

== Births ==
- 21 May – William Dowell, Welsh dual-code rugby player (died 1949)
- 26 June – David John Williams, writer and politician (died 1970)
- 2 August – Clarence Bruce, 3rd Baron Aberdare (died 1957)
- 5 September – Jenkin Alban Davies, Welsh international rugby captain (died 1976)
- 21 November – Robert Evans, footballer (died 1965)
- date unknown
  - Ernest Evans, politician (died 1965)
  - James Grey West, architect (died 1951, in Beer, Devon)

== Deaths ==
- 21 January – John Gwyn Jeffreys, conchologist, 76
- 15 March – Jane Williams (Ysgafell), writer, 79
- 1 May – Henry Brinley Richards, composer, 67
- 10 May – Edward Stephen, composer, 62
- 27 July – Penry Williams, artist, 82
- 1 August – Sidney Gilchrist Thomas, metallurgist and inventor, 34
- 24 September – Samuel Roberts, political and economic writer, 85

== See also ==
- 1885 in Ireland
