= 1890 in Wales =

- Centuries: 17th; 18th; 19th; 20th; 21st
- Decades: 1870s; 1880s; 1890s; 1900s; 1910s
- See also: List of years in Wales; Timeline of Welsh history 1890 in The United Kingdom Scotland Elsewhere

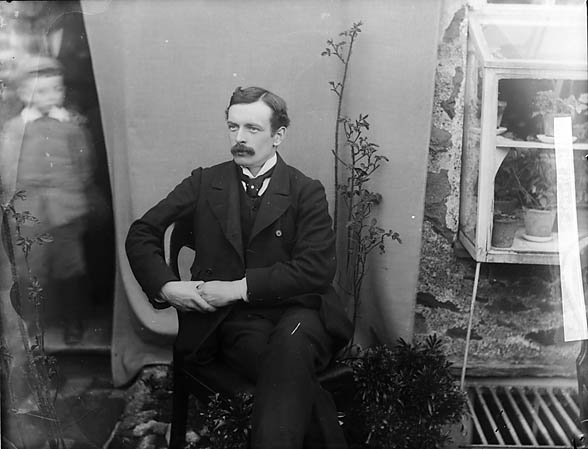
David Lloyd George, around the time he won the election of the seat for Caernarfon Borough in 1890; he would be re-elected for the next 55 years.

This article is about the particular significance of the year 1890 to Wales and its people.

== Incumbents ==
- Archdruid of the National Eisteddfod of Wales – Clwydfardd
- Lord Lieutenant of Anglesey – Richard Davies
- Lord Lieutenant of Brecknockshire – Joseph Bailey, 1st Baron Glanusk
- Lord Lieutenant of Caernarvonshire – John Ernest Greaves
- Lord Lieutenant of Cardiganshire – Herbert Davies-Evans
- Lord Lieutenant of Carmarthenshire – John Campbell, 2nd Earl Cawdor
- Lord Lieutenant of Denbighshire – William Cornwallis-West
- Lord Lieutenant of Flintshire – Hugh Robert Hughes
- Lord Lieutenant of Glamorgan – Christopher Rice Mansel Talbot (until 17 January); Robert Windsor-Clive, 1st Earl of Plymouth (from 26 June)
- Lord Lieutenant of Merionethshire – Robert Davies Pryce
- Lord Lieutenant of Monmouthshire – Henry Somerset, 8th Duke of Beaufort
- Lord Lieutenant of Montgomeryshire – Edward Herbert, 3rd Earl of Powis
- Lord Lieutenant of Pembrokeshire – William Edwardes, 4th Baron Kensington
- Lord Lieutenant of Radnorshire – Arthur Walsh, 2nd Baron Ormathwaite
- Bishop of Bangor – James Colquhoun Campbell (retired in April) Daniel Lewis Lloyd (from 24 June)
- Bishop of Llandaff – Richard Lewis
- Bishop of St Asaph – Alfred George Edwards (from 25 March)
- Bishop of St Davids – Basil Jones

== Events ==
- 6 February - In a gas explosion at Llanerch Colliery, Pontypool, 176 miners are killed.
- 10 March - In a gas explosion at Morfa Colliery, Port Talbot, 86 miners are killed.
- 7 April - An Easter Monday conference at Llangefni leads to agreement with employers on a shorter working day for male agricultural labourers.
- 13 April - At a by-election in Caernarfon, David Lloyd George wins the seat for the Liberals from the Conservatives, defeating H. J. E. Nanney, the local squire; Lloyd George remains the constituency MP until his death in 1945.
- 22 May - Y Cymro is launched by Isaac Foulkes (Llyfrbryf) in Liverpool as a liberal weekly Welsh language "national newspaper for Welshmen at home and abroad"; it is published until 1909.
- Summer - Queen Elisabeth of Romania visits Llandudno, staying for five weeks and later remembering it as "a beautiful haven of peace"; the phrase is later translated into Welsh and used as the town's motto.
- 21 December - Beginning of a 3-week period of severe winter weather causing deaths and disruption to daily life in many parts of Wales.
- Opening of the Rock Mill watermill for woollen milling at Capel Dewi, Llandysul.

== Arts and literature ==
=== Awards ===
National Eisteddfod of Wales - held at Bangor

- Chair - Thomas Tudno Jones, "Y Llafurwr"
- Crown - John John Roberts, "Ardderchog Lu'r Merthyri"

=== New books ===
- Rhoda Broughton - Alas!
- Arthur Machen - The Great God Pan (in the magazine The Whirlwind)

=== Music ===
==== Events ====
- The National Musical Association of Wales is formed, with Joseph Parry as a sponsor.

==== Works ====
- John Thomas Rees - "Duw sydd noddfa"

== Sport ==
- Cricket - The England ladies' team plays an exhibition match at Newport.
- Football - The Welsh Cup is won by Chirk for the third time.
- Hockey - The Welsh Hockey Association is founded.
- Rugby union - Wales win their very first international against England. The only try was scored by Cardiff's 'Buller' Stadden.

== Births ==
- 2 January - Madoline Thomas, actress (died 1989)
- 21 January - Jack Anthony, jockey (died 1954)
- 14 February - Nina Hamnett, artist and Bohemian (died 1956)
- 1 March - Jack Beames, rugby player (died 1970)
- 16 February - Thomas Ifor Rees, diplomat (died 1977)
- 20 April - Ernest Roberts, politician (died 1969)
- 5 May - George Littlewood Hirst, Wales international rugby player (died 1967)
- 14 June - Dai Hiddlestone, Wales international rugby player (died 1973)
- 21 June - W. J. A. Davies, rugby player (died 1967)
- 28 July - Horace Thomas, Wales international rugby player (died 1916)
- 30 August - Llewelyn Wyn Griffith, novelist (died 1977)
- 13 September - Johnny Basham, boxer (died 1947)
- 19 September - Jim Griffiths, politician, first Secretary of State for Wales (died 1975)
- 22 November (in Lancashire) - Harry Pollitt, Communist trade union leader and parliamentary candidate for Rhondda East (died 1960)
- 6 December - Dion Fortune, born Violet Firth, English occultist and novelist (died 1946)
- 16 December - P. J. Grigg, politician (died 1964)

== Deaths ==
- 17 January - Christopher Rice Mansel Talbot, landowner, industrialist and politician, 86
- 20 January - Guillermo Rawson, Argentinian politician and patron of Patagonian Welsh colony, 68
- 4 March - Henry Davies, journalist, publisher and librarian, 86
- 19 March - Edmund Swetenham, MP for Caernarfon, 67
- 8 April - William Jones, Army officer, 81/2
- 21 March - Benjamin Thomas Williams, politician, 57
- 29 June - Henry Herbert, 4th Earl of Carnarvon, 59
- 12 July - David Pugh, politician, 84
- 20 July - David Davies "Llandinam", industrialist, 71
- 6 August - Thomas Babington Jones, cricketer, 39
- 10 October - Charles Herbert James, politician, 73
- 27 October - Enoch Salisbury, barrister, politician and bibliophile, 70
- unknown date - John Cambrian Rowland, painter, 70

== See also ==
- 1890 in Ireland
