= 1864 in Wales =

- Centuries: 17th; 18th; 19th; 20th; 21st
- Decades: 1840s; 1850s; 1860s; 1870s; 1880s
- See also: List of years in Wales; Timeline of Welsh history 1864 in The United Kingdom Scotland Elsewhere

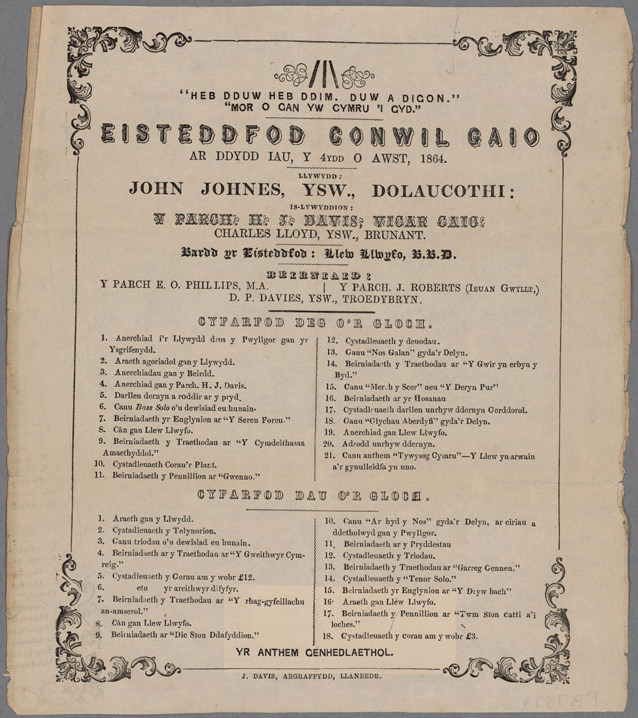
Eisteddfod Programme of events, 1864.

This article is about the particular significance of the year 1864 to Wales and its people.

== Incumbents ==
- Lord Lieutenant of Anglesey – Henry Paget, 2nd Marquess of Anglesey
- Lord Lieutenant of Brecknockshire – John Lloyd Vaughan Watkins
- Lord Lieutenant of Caernarvonshire – Sir Richard Williams-Bulkeley, 10th Baronet
- Lord Lieutenant of Cardiganshire – Edward Pryse
- Lord Lieutenant of Carmarthenshire – John Campbell, 2nd Earl Cawdor
- Lord Lieutenant of Denbighshire – Robert Myddelton Biddulph
- Lord Lieutenant of Flintshire – Sir Stephen Glynne, 9th Baronet
- Lord Lieutenant of Glamorgan – Christopher Rice Mansel Talbot
- Lord Lieutenant of Merionethshire – Edward Lloyd-Mostyn, 2nd Baron Mostyn
- Lord Lieutenant of Monmouthshire – Benjamin Hall, 1st Baron Llanover
- Lord Lieutenant of Montgomeryshire – Sudeley Hanbury-Tracy, 3rd Baron Sudeley
- Lord Lieutenant of Pembrokeshire – William Edwardes, 3rd Baron Kensington
- Lord Lieutenant of Radnorshire – John Walsh, 1st Baron Ormathwaite
- Bishop of Bangor – James Colquhoun Campbell
- Bishop of Llandaff – Alfred Ollivant
- Bishop of St Asaph – Thomas Vowler Short
- Bishop of St Davids – Connop Thirlwall

== Events ==
- June - David Lloyd George's father dies and his family move from Pembrokeshire to Llanystumdwy to be cared for by his maternal uncle, Richard Lloyd, when he is aged 18 months.
- June 23 - Aberystwyth is linked to the rail network for the first time.
- October 6 - The Denbigh, Ruthin and Corwen Railway is completed throughout to Corwen.
- David Davies Llandinam takes a lease of coal in the Upper Rhondda Valley and sinks the Parc and Maindy pits.
- Opening of Rhosydd Quarry narrow gauge railway incline on the upper Croesor Tramway at the head of the Croesor valley.
- The Llandudno Improvement Commissioners attempt to ban Punch and Judy shows. In this year, the town first receives the title "Queen of Welsh Resorts".

== Arts and literature ==
=== Awards ===
- National Eisteddfod of Wales is held at Llandudno. The chair is won by Richard Foulkes Edwards (Rhisiart Ddu o Wynedd).

=== New books ===
==== English language ====
- R. D. Blackmore - Clara Vaughan
- Sir John Henry Philipps - Lyrics
- Alfred Russel Wallace - The Origin of Human Races and the Antiquity of Man Deduced from the Theory of Natural Selection
- Frances Williams-Wynn - Diaries of a Lady of Quality (posthumously published)

==== Welsh language ====
- Huw Derfel - Llawlyfr Carnedd Llywelyn
- Robert Jones Derfel - Traethodau ac Areithiau
- Daniel Silvan Evans (ed.) - Y Marchog Crwydrad: Hen Ffuglith Gymreig

=== Music ===
- William Griffiths (Ifander) - Gwarchae Harlech (cantata)

== Sport ==
- Cricket
  - South Wales Cricket Club play Gentlemen of Sussex. The South Wales team includes W. G. Grace, who scores 170.
- Football
  - October 22 - The predecessor of Wrexham A.F.C. plays its first match, making it the oldest association football club in Wales and the world's sixth oldest football club.

== Births ==
- January 8
  - Prince Albert Victor, first child of the Prince and Princess of Wales (died 1892)
  - Thomas Allen Glenn, soldier and historian (died 1948)
- February 7 - Alfred Augustus Mathews, vicar and Wales international rugby player (died 1946)
- March 11 - John Silas Evans, astronomer (died 1953)
- May 4 - Harry Bowen, Wales international rugby player (died 1913)
- June 5 - Edward Pegge, Wales international rugby player (died 1915)
- July 5 - Lloyd Kenyon, 4th Baron Kenyon (died 1927)
- August 19 - Charles Green, first Bishop of Monmouth (died 1944)
- September 15
  - Fred Andrews, Wales international rugby player (died 1929)
  - Giotto Griffiths, Wales international rugby player (died 1938)
- September 21 - Ernest Rowland, priest and Wales international rugby player (died 1940)
- October 10
  - Edward Bishop - Wales international rugby union player (died 1919)
  - Arthur Gould - Wales international rugby union captain (died 1919)
- October 17 - Sir John Morris-Jones, grammarian (died 1929)
- November 4 - Margaret Owen, later wife of David Lloyd George (died 1941)

== Deaths ==
- 11 March - Richard Roberts, engineer, 74
- 28 March - Ellis Evans, Baptist minister and author, 77
- 18 June
  - Evan Davies, missionary, 59
  - William Smith O'Brien, Irish nationalist, 60 (in Bangor)
- 20 June - John Davies (Brychan), poet, 79
- 24 July - Lloyd Kenyon, 3rd Baron Kenyon, 59
- 1 August - Thomas Rees, Unitarian minister (born 1777)
- 29 December - Mary Jones, early owner of a Welsh Bible, 80

== See also ==
- 1864 in Ireland
