= James Davies (Iago ap Dewi) =

Welsh poet

James Davies (Iago ap Dewi) (1800 – 16 April 1869) was a Welsh poet, and printer. He was born and grew up at Pencader in Carmarthenshire, where he worked from a young age as a farm labourer. When about 20 years of age, he began an apprenticeship with John Evans, a local printer, at the Seren Gomer office. His poetry was encouraged by two colleagues: W. E. Jones ("Gwilym Cawrdaf") and William Thomas ("Gwilym Mai").

Around 1840, when Davies left Carmarthen, he went to work at Josiah Thomas Jones's printing office at Cowbridge, where Jones had come from Merthyr Tydfil. He continued with the firm for the rest of his life, moving with Jones in 1842 to Carmarthen, and in 1854 to Aberdare.

His works include a number of poems he published under the title Myfyrdodau Barddonol (1858).

He died in April 1869.
