= Samuel Bowen (Independent minister) =

Samuel Bowen (1799–1887) was a Welsh Independent minister, and teacher. He was son of David Bowen, one of the founders of the Independent church in Blaen-y-Coed. Samuel was educated at Carmarthen Grammar School, and was subsequently admitted to the academy at Llanfyllin (which moved to Newtown in 1821). After completing his studies at the college, he was appointed a member of the college staff. He was also appointed minister of Kerry chapel near Newtown in the same year.

He accepted the appointment in 1830 of Minister of Macclesfield, an appointment which lasted for 30 years. He eventually transferred to an appointment in Burnley where he remained until 1875.

He died in Burnley in 1887.
