= Titus Lewis =

Welsh Baptist minister (1773–1811)

Titus Lewis (21 February 1773 – 1 May 1811) was a Welsh Baptist minister and author. Lewis is notable for several important works, including the publication of A Welsh-English Dictionary (1805) and several volumes of hymns and biblical commentaries.

== Bibliography ==
Lewis was born in Cilgerran to Lewis Thomas, a minister at Cilfowyr. He was baptised at Blaen-y-waun and was preaching by 1794, and was ordained there in 1798. He married in 1800, but his wife's dislike of the area saw them move to Carmarthen, where he became minister of Dark Gate Baptist Church. In 1805 he published A Welsh-English Dictionary, and in 1806 with the aid of Joseph Harris, he published the journal Y Drysorfa Efangylaidd, Lewis using the pseudonyms 'Obadiah' and 'Gaius' while Harris wrote under the name 'Adelphos o Abertawe'. In 1810 Lewis published Hanes … Prydain Fawr, a 624-page volume and his most significant work. He then, along with Christmas Evans, and Harris, decided to translate Gill's commentary on the New Testament into Welsh. It is believed that the published work of this project was primarily Lewis', based on the evidence that after his death in 1811, no further translations appeared.
