= Christopher Rice Mansel Talbot =

Welsh landowner, industrialist and politician

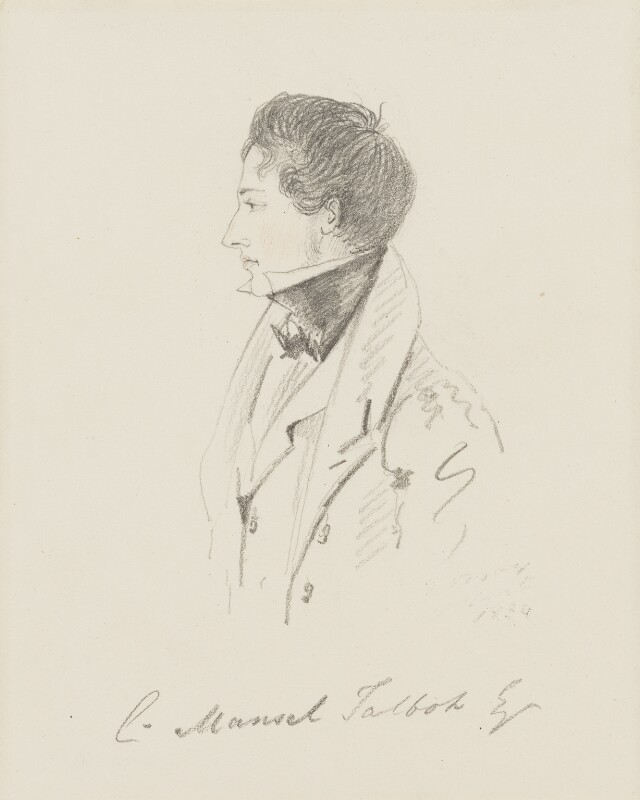
Christopher Rice Mansel Talbot by Alfred, Count D'Orsay in 1834

Christopher Rice Mansel Talbot FRS (10 May 1803 – 17 January 1890) was a Welsh landowner, industrialist and Liberal politician. He developed his estate at Margam near Swansea as an extensive ironworks, served by railways and a port, which was renamed Port Talbot. He served as a member of parliament for Glamorgan constituencies from 1830 until his death in 1890, a sixty-year tenure which made him the second longest serving MP in the nineteenth century. He was Lord Lieutenant of Glamorgan, from 1848 to 1890.

== Background ==
Talbot was descended from the Earls of Shrewsbury, through Hensol Castle, Talbot's Castle and Lacock Abbey. The family had bought Margam Abbey and its extensive 18,725 acres (7,578 ha) parish of Margam during the dissolution of the monasteries. Having then married with the Mansels of Oxwich and Penrice, the Talbots had become Glamorgan's largest resident landowners, with estates totalling 34,000 acres (14,000 ha) in that county alone. Their home estate at Margam included ancient metal workings, and extensive mineral rights across Margam, Kenfig and Aberavon. Talbot's father acquired the estate at Penrice, where having rebuilt Penrice Castle by 1820 the annual rent revenues reached £15,000.

== Early life ==
Christopher Rice Mansel Talbot was born at Penrice, Swansea, the son of Thomas Mansel Talbot, and Lady Mary Lucy, the daughter of Henry Fox-Strangways, 2nd Earl of Ilchester. When his father died in 1813, Christopher was only ten years old, so his estates at Penrice and Margam were held in trust until he came of age in 1824. His governess for some time was Agnes Porter. He was educated at a private school in Dorset, and then at Harrow School and Oriel College, Oxford, from where he graduated in 1824 with a 1st class honours degree in mathematics. He then undertook a Grand Tour of Europe. His favourite activities were yachting, racing and hunting. In 1823 he was elected a member of the Royal Yacht Club (later the Royal Yacht Squadron), and he was its Vice Commodore from 1851 to 1861.

== Early parliamentary and public career, 1830-1868 ==
Nine members of the Mansel family had sat in Parliament from the early sixteenth century and the family were seen in aristocratic circles as Glamorganshire's natural representatives at Westminster. Talbot's father, however, had shown no interest in becoming an MP but after his death in 1813, the family reasserted its political influences when his mother's second husband, Sir Christopher Cole was elected as county member in 1817. This was commonly regarded as a family arrangement until C.R.M. Talbot was ready to enter political life.

Even in 1817, however, there was some opposition to Cole's election. At the meeting in Bridgend where the new member was returned unopposed, George Tennant, a Swansea industrialist, struck a note of discontent.

Will you not, at some convenient time, avail yourself of those well-known means which are always at hand to enable you to retire from your post, when the infant legislator of the House of Margam shall be ripe for action, and thus surrender back the situation which you hold as a trust for that family by, whose interests you have been principally supported throughout the present election.

As widely expected therefore, Talbot virtually inherited the role of Member of Parliament for Glamorganshire in 1830 upon the retirement of his stepfather. Although nominally considered a Liberal, Talbot exercised considerable independence for most of his long political career, and his freedom to operate outside of party structures only became limited by the parliamentary reforms which occurred in the latter part of his time in the Commons, where he remained for the rest of his life.

Although firmly of the Whig wing of the Liberal Party, Talbot had shown signs of support for more radical policies long before the Gladstonian takeover of the party in the 1860s. In 1853 he voted in favour of the ballot. Two years later he supported the abolition of church rates, and in 1856, voted along with the Swansea member Lewis Llewelyn Dillwyn in support of Irish disestablishment.

== Industry and transport ==
Talbot recognised that improved transport could stimulate industrial growth, and as Member of Parliament he introduced a Bill in 1834 to improve the old harbour at Aberavon; two years later, a further Bill provided for the harbour's expansion and a change of name to Port Talbot in his honour. He also encouraged the development of Swansea docks, and pioneered the introduction of railways to south Wales, being chairman and a shareholder in the South Wales Railway Company, which was acquired by the Great Western Railway in 1863, with Talbot joining the board of the GWR.

Talbot also invested in the area's extractive and metal production industries. The Port Talbot ironworks opened in early 1831, part of the industrialisation then taking place across south Wales; copper had been smelted at nearby Neath since 1584, and there were tinworks and ironworks at Pontardawe.

In 1869 aboard his private yacht Lynx he attended the opening of the Suez Canal, accompanied by members of his family and several guests. When he was in Egypt, Gladstone offered him a peerage, but he declined on this and two other occasions. He was adjudged the wealthiest commoner of his time.

== Margam Castle ==
Over a five-year period from 1830, Talbot set about redeveloping the family estate at Margam Castle. The mansion was designed in the Tudor Gothic style by architect Thomas Hopper (1776–1856), while Edward Haycock (1790–1870) was supervisory architect and designed parts of the interior and exterior of the house, the stables, terraces and lodges. Talbot also took a keen interest in the project, encouraging his architects to borrow elements from Lacock Abbey in Wiltshire (ancestral home of the Talbots and home to his cousin William Henry Fox Talbot) and Melbury House in Dorset (home of his mother's family, the Fox-Strangways, Earls of Ilchester). Margam Castle is a Grade I listed building owned by Neath and Port Talbot County Borough council.

Talbot encouraged his relations William Fox Talbot and John Talbot Dillwyn Llewelyn in the development of photography and was himself a Fellow of the Royal Society.

== Later parliamentary career, 1868-1890 ==
Talbot, like his fellow county member, Sir Hussey Vivian, were not opposed to parliamentary reform. The Reform Acts of 1867 and 1884, together with the redistribution of boundaries for the 1885 General Election, led to the enfranchisement of increasing numbers of industrial workers. In time this was to revolutionise the politics of Glamorgan, but the immediate impact was to increase the Liberal Party's hold on the county and make the election of a Conservative, in most seats, almost inconceivable.

On redistribution of parliamentary seats in 1885, he was elected for Mid Glamorganshire, a predominantly mining constituency, which included the Llynfi, Garw and Ogmore valleys Despite his venerable status the Liberal Association initially considered other candidates including Gwilym Williams and J. Carvell Williams.

Talbot, at this time, was asked by William Abraham for his views on the election of labour representatives to the House of Commons, and specifically the desirability of a labour member representing the new Rhondda constituency. Talbot replied as follows:

I am of opinion that there has always hitherto been a great dearth of such members in the House of Commons, and that if a few really able men were elected, the proceedings in Parliament would be all the more likely to give satisfaction to the bulk of the labouring classes. We have plenty of employers of labour in the House, and many amongst them who profess to have the interest of their men at heart, and we have also a large number who from sentimental or philosophical motives advocate the promotion of the welfare of the people. But none of these men possess that intimate acquaintance with the peculiarities and specialties of mining operations which men who have themselves had experience as workmen in the mine have acquired, and they are often led in consequence to legislate on what they believe to be the interest of their constituents, but in what really is to their injury. Hence it is that I believe the presence of real working men in the House would be of vast advantage to the community at large, and I should be very glad to hear that the electors in the new Rhondda division entertained the same feeling, and were likely to send one of their own body to represent them.

Even though Talbot had reconciled himself with Gladstonian Liberalism to a significant extent, he had very little time for subjects relating specifically to Wales. He refused to take any part in the campaigns for Welsh disestablishment and Welsh intermediate education, in contrast to his fellow Glamorgan member, Hussey Vivian. Above all, he was firmly opposed to the Cymru Fydd movement. which demanded Welsh Home Rule.

Having initially opposed Irish Home Rule, there was criticism of his standpoint, particularly in the Maesteg area. He complained to his fellow county member, Hussey Vivian, that he had a meeting with Maesteg Liberals and although they were friendly to his face, 'I am told that [they] became quarrelsome after I left, and suggested various substitutes'. A few weeks later, however, a meeting of the Association at Briton Ferry which, significantly, was not attended by delegates from some industrial districts, unanimously re-adopted Talbot, stating that he had 'made great progress towards the views they, as an association, held'.

Although at heart a Liberal Unionist, Talbot also supported a range of Gladstonian policies and this was undoubtedly a factor in preventing opposition at the 1886 General Election.

He retained his seat until his death, becoming Father of the House of Commons. He was described as "a tall, elderly gentleman ... wearing a long woollen comforter" in Sir Henry Lucy's Diary of the Salisbury Parliament for 10 June 1888 which was published in book form in 1892.

Talbot was the last Whig aristocratic landowner to represent Glamorgan in the House of Commons and, upon his death in 1890, he was succeeded by Samuel Thomas Evans, the nonconformist son of a Skewen tradesman, and a prominent radical.

== Legacy and family ==
On 31 October 1880, Talbot laid the foundation stone of Maesteg Town Hall, Maesteg. He gave £500 (£52,000 today) towards the building fund, and the miners of the valley agreed to levy themselves a day's wages towards the cost.

In Llanfair, his name still survives in "Talbot Terrace". In 1865 there was a public house in the village called the "Talbot Arms."

Talbot married Lady Charlotte Butler, daughter of The 1st Earl of Glengall, at Cahir House, County Tipperary, on 28 December 1835. She died at Malta on 23 March 1846, where the Talbots were on their yacht Galatea.

Talbot's only son Theodore died in 1876 following a hunting accident. Hence the dedication to St. Theodore of an Anglo-Catholic parish in the east of Port Talbot. It was therefore his daughter Emily Charlotte Talbot (1840–1918) who inherited her father's fortune and became just as notable in the development of ports and railways. Another daughter, Olive Talbot, founded an Anglican theological college in Aberdare which subsequently moved to Cardiff Road, Llandaff; it was called St. Michael's College. Lt.-Col. Sir John Mansel Miller was his great-grandson.

== Bibliography ==
- Campbell, Thomas Methuen (2000). "C.R.M. Talbot 1803–1890". Morgannwg. 44: 66–104.
- Morgan, Kenneth O. (1960). "Democratic Politics in Glamorgan, 1884–1914". Morgannwg. 4: 5–27.
- Ball, Enid (1966). "Glamorgan Members during the Reform Bill period". Morgannwg. 10: 5–30.

Parliament of the United Kingdom
Preceded by Sir Christopher Cole	Member of Parliament for Glamorganshire; 1830–1885; With: Lewis Weston Dillwyn 1832–1837; Viscount Adare 1837–1851; Sir George Tyler 1851–1857; Sir Henry Vivian, Bt 1857–1885	Constituency abolished
New constituency	Member of Parliament for Mid Glamorganshire; 1885–1890	Succeeded by Sir Samuel Evans
Honorary titles
Preceded by The Marquess of Bute	Lord Lieutenant of Glamorgan; 1848–1890	Succeeded by The Lord Windsor
Preceded by George Weld-Forester	Father of the House; 1874–1890	Succeeded by Charles Pelham Villiers
