= Lord Lieutenant of Radnorshire =

Welsh county ceremonial officer

This is a list of people who have served as Lord-Lieutenant of Radnorshire. After 1715, all Lord Lieutenants were also Custos Rotulorum of Radnorshire. The office was abolished on 31 March 1974, being replaced by the Lord Lieutenant of Powys, with Deputy Lieutenants for Radnorshire.

== Lord Lieutenants of Radnorshire to 1974 ==
- see Lord Lieutenant of Wales before 1694
- Thomas Herbert, 8th Earl of Pembroke 11 May 1694 – 14 October 1715
- Thomas Coningsby, 1st Earl Coningsby 14 October 1715 – 11 September 1721
- James Brydges, 1st Duke of Chandos 11 September 1721 – 9 August 1744
- vacant
- William Perry 9 December 1746 – 13 January 1756
- Howell Gwynne 13 January 1756 – 12 July 1766
- Edward Harley, 4th Earl of Oxford and Earl Mortimer 12 July 1766 – 11 October 1790
- Thomas Harley 8 April 1791 – 12 January 1804
- George Rodney, 3rd Baron Rodney 13 September 1804 – 1842
- John Walsh, 1st Baron Ormathwaite 22 July 1842 – 21 April 1875
- Arthur Walsh, 2nd Baron Ormathwaite 21 April 1875 – 12 September 1895
- Sir Powlett Milbank, 2nd Baronet 12 September 1895 – 30 January 1918
- Arthur Walsh, 3rd Baron Ormathwaite 5 April 1918 – 20 January 1922
- Charles Coltman-Rogers 20 January 1922 – 19 May 1929
- Sir Charles Dillwyn-Venables-Llewelyn, 2nd Baronet 20 June 1929 – 10 August 1949
- Sir Michael Dillwyn-Venables-Llewelyn, 3rd Baronet 10 August 1949 – 31 March 1974
