= Lord Lieutenant of Pembrokeshire =

Welsh county ceremonial officer

This is a list of people who have served as Lord Lieutenant of Pembrokeshire. After 1715, all Lord Lieutenants were also Custos Rotulorum of Pembrokeshire. The county corporate of Haverfordwest was included in this lieutenancy, except for the period from 1761 to 1931, when there was a separate Lord Lieutenant of Haverfordwest. On 31 March 1974, the post was replaced by that of Lord Lieutenant of Dyfed.

== Lord Lieutenants of Pembrokeshire to 1974 ==
- see Lord Lieutenant of Wales before 1694
- Thomas Herbert, 8th Earl of Pembroke 11 May 1694 – 7 October 1715
- Sir Arthur Owen, 3rd Baronet 7 October 1715 – 6 June 1753
- Sir William Owen, 4th Baronet 2 August 1753 – 24 June 1775
- Sir Hugh Owen, 5th Baronet 24 June 1775 – 16 January 1786
- Richard Philipps, 1st Baron Milford 11 June 1786 – 28 November 1823
- Sir John Owen, 1st Baronet 1 January 1824 – 6 February 1861
- William Edwardes, 3rd Baron Kensington 26 April 1861 – 1 January 1872
- William Edwardes, 4th Baron Kensington 6 February 1872 – 7 October 1896
- Frederick Campbell, 3rd Earl Cawdor 23 November 1896 – 8 February 1911
- John Philipps, 1st Viscount St Davids 21 March 1911 – 21 December 1932
- Sir Evan Davies Jones, 1st Baronet 21 December 1932 – 21 August 1944
- Col. Laurence Hugh Higgon 21 August 1944 – 4 May 1954
- Air Cdre. James Bevan Bowen 4 May 1954 – 18 April 1958?
- Maj. Hon. Richard Hanning Philipps 18 April 1958 – 31 March 1974 †

†Became Lord Lieutenant of Dyfed, 1 April 1974.

== Deputy lieutenants ==
A deputy lieutenant of Pembrokeshire is commissioned by the Lord Lieutenant of Pembrokeshire. Deputy lieutenants support the work of the lord-lieutenant. There can be several deputy lieutenants at any time, depending on the population of the county. Their appointment does not terminate with the changing of the lord-lieutenant, but they usually retire at age 75.

=== 19th Century ===
- Owen Owen

== Sources ==
- J.C. Sainty (1970). "Lieutenancies of Counties, 1585–1642". Bulletin of the Institute of Historical Research (Special Supplement No. 8).
- J.C. Sainty (1979). List of Lieutenants of Counties of England and Wales 1660-1974. London: Swift Printers (Sales) Ltd.
