= List of lord lieutenants of Anglesey =

Welsh county ceremonial officer

This is a list of people who served as Lord Lieutenant of Anglesey. Since 1761, all lord lieutenants have also been Custos Rotulorum of Anglesey. The office was abolished on 31 March 1974.

== Lord lieutenants of Anglesey to 1974 ==
- see Lord Lieutenant of Wales before 1694
- Charles Talbot, 1st Duke of Shrewsbury 31 May 1694 – 10 March 1696
- Charles Gerard, 2nd Earl of Macclesfield 10 March 1696 – 5 November 1701
- William Stanley, 9th Earl of Derby 18 June 1702 – 5 November 1702
- Hugh Cholmondeley, 1st Earl of Cholmondeley 2 December 1702 – 4 September 1713
- Other Windsor, 2nd Earl of Plymouth 4 September 1713 – 21 October 1714
- Hugh Cholmondeley, 1st Earl of Cholmondeley 21 October 1714 – 18 January 1725
- George Cholmondeley, 2nd Earl of Cholmondeley 7 April 1725 – 7 May 1733
- George Cholmondeley, 3rd Earl of Cholmondeley 14 June 1733 – 25 October 1760
- Sir Nicholas Bayly, 2nd Baronet 25 November 1761 – 1 August 1782
- Henry Bayly Paget, 1st Earl of Uxbridge 1 August 1782 – 13 March 1812
- Henry Paget, 1st Marquess of Anglesey 28 April 1812 – 29 April 1854
- Henry Paget, 2nd Marquess of Anglesey 18 May 1854 – 7 February 1869
- William Owen Stanley 2 March 1869 – 24 February 1884
- Richard Davies 1 April 1884 – 27 October 1896
- Sir Richard Henry Williams-Bulkeley, 12th Baronet 30 November 1896 – 7 July 1942
- Charles Paget, 6th Marquess of Anglesey 24 August 1942 – 21 February 1947
- Sir Richard Harry David Williams-Bulkeley, 13th Baronet 5 August 1947 – 31 March 1974†

† Became the first lord lieutenant of Gwynedd on 1 April 1974

== Deputy lieutenants ==
- Richard Bennett, 19 February 1901
