= Lord Lieutenant of Merionethshire =

Welsh county ceremonial officer

This is a list of people who served as Lord Lieutenant of Merionethshire. After 1762, all Lord Lieutenants were also Custos Rotulorum of Merionethshire. The office was abolished on 31 March 1974, and the area is now covered by the Lord Lieutenant of Gwynedd and Lord Lieutenant of Clwyd.

== Lord Lieutenants of Merionethshire to 1974 ==
- see Lord Lieutenant of Wales before 1694
- Charles Talbot, 1st Duke of Shrewsbury 31 May 1694 – 10 March 1696
- Charles Gerard, 2nd Earl of Macclesfield 10 March 1696 – 5 November 1701
- William Stanley, 9th Earl of Derby 18 June 1702 – 5 November 1702
- Hugh Cholmondeley, 1st Earl of Cholmondeley 2 December 1702 – 4 September 1713
- Other Windsor, 2nd Earl of Plymouth 4 September 1713 – 21 October 1714
- Hugh Cholmondeley, 1st Earl of Cholmondeley 21 October 1714 – 18 January 1725
- George Cholmondeley, 2nd Earl of Cholmondeley 7 April 1725 – 7 May 1733
- George Cholmondeley, 3rd Earl of Cholmondeley 14 June 1733 – 25 October 1760
- vacant
- William Vaughan 26 April 1762 – 12 April 1775
- Sir Watkin Williams-Wynn, 4th Baronet 10 June 1775 – 1789
- Watkin Williams 27 August 1789 – 4 December 1793
- Sir Watkin Williams-Wynn, 5th Baronet 4 December 1793 – 6 January 1840
- Edward Lloyd-Mostyn, 2nd Baron Mostyn 25 January 1840 – 17 March 1884
- Robert Davies Pryce 17 May 1884 – 30 September 1891
- W. R. M. Wynne 30 September 1891 – 25 February 1909
- Sir Arthur Osmond Williams, 1st Baronet 22 March 1909 – 28 January 1927
- George Ormsby-Gore, 3rd Baron Harlech 22 February 1927 – 8 May 1938
- William Ormsby-Gore, 4th Baron Harlech 22 June 1938 – 25 June 1957
- Col. John Francis Williams-Wynne, 25 June 1957 – 31 March 1974

== Deputy Lieutenants ==
Deputy Lieutenants traditionally supported the Lord-Lieutenant. There could be several deputy lieutenants at any time, depending on the population of the county. Their appointment did not terminate with the changing of the Lord-Lieutenant, but they usually retired at age 75.

- Hugh Beaver Roberts (1820–1903) April 7, 1863
- Romer Williams, 19 April 1901
- Lieutenant-Colonel George Frederick Scott, 15 May 1901
