= Lord Lieutenant of Monmouthshire =

Welsh county ceremonial officer

This is a list of people who served as Lord Lieutenant of Monmouthshire. Before the English Civil War, the lieutenancy of Monmouthshire was held by the Lord Lieutenant of Wales, except for the period from 1602 to 1629, when it formed a separate lieutenancy in conjunction with Glamorgan. After the English Restoration in 1660, it was again held by the Lord Lieutenant of Wales from 1672 until 1694, when the twelve central Welsh lieutenancies were divided. After 1715 each office holder was also Custos Rotulorum of Monmouthshire. The combined position was finally abolished on 31 March 1974 and replaced with that of the Lord Lieutenant of Gwent.

== Lord Lieutenants ==
- Henry Herbert, 2nd Earl of Pembroke 24 February 1587 – 19 January 1601
- Edward Somerset, 4th Earl of Worcester 17 July 1602 – 3 March 1628 jointly with
- Henry Somerset, 5th Earl of Worcester 3 December 1626 – 9 May 1629
- William Compton, 1st Earl of Northampton 9 May 1629 – 24 June 1630
- John Egerton, 1st Earl of Bridgewater 11 July 1631 – 1642
- Interregnum
- Henry Somerset, 1st Duke of Beaufort 30 July 1660 – 22 March 1689
- Charles Gerard, 1st Earl of Macclesfield 22 March 1689 – 7 January 1694
- Thomas Herbert, 8th Earl of Pembroke 11 May 1694 – 7 October 1715
- John Morgan 7 October 1715 – 7 March 1720
- Sir William Morgan 21 June 1720 – 24 April 1731
- Thomas Morgan 18 June 1731 – 12 April 1769
- Thomas Morgan 27 January 1770 – 15 May 1771
- Henry Somerset, 5th Duke of Beaufort 23 December 1771 – 11 October 1803
- Henry Somerset, 6th Duke of Beaufort 4 November 1803 – 2 December 1835
- Capel Hanbury Leigh 24 December 1835 – 28 September 1861
- Benjamin Hall, 1st Baron Llanover 9 November 1861 – 27 April 1867
- Henry Somerset, 8th Duke of Beaufort 21 May 1867 – 30 April 1899
- Godfrey Morgan, 1st Viscount Tredegar 23 June 1899 – 11 March 1913
- Ivor Herbert, 1st Baron Treowen 4 April 1913 – 18 October 1933
- Courtenay Morgan, 1st Viscount Tredegar 4 December 1933 – 3 May 1934
- Sir Henry Mather-Jackson, 3rd Baronet 1 June 1934 – 23 March 1942
- FitzRoy Somerset, 4th Baron Raglan 27 April 1942 – 14 September 1964
- Edward Roderick Hill 15 February 1965 – 31 March 1974

== Deputy lieutenants ==
A deputy lieutenant of Monmouthshire is commissioned by the Lord Lieutenant of Monmouthshire. Deputy lieutenants support the work of the lord-lieutenant. There can be several deputy lieutenants at any time, depending on the population of the county. Their appointment does not terminate with the changing of the lord-lieutenant, but they usually retire at age 75.

=== 18th Century ===
- 1793: William Harrison
- 12 May 1798: Sir Robert Salusbury, 1st Baronet
- 12 May 1798: William Piiillips
- 12 May 1798: George Griffin
- 12 May 1798: Henry Parry
- 29 May 1798: Sir Samuel Brudenell Fludyer, 2nd Baronet
- 29 May 1798: Capel Leigh
- 29 May 1798: William Phillips
- 29 May 1798: Fowler Walker

=== 19th Century ===
- 1 August 1834: William Jones

== Sources ==
- J.C. Sainty (1970). "Lieutenancies of Counties, 1585–1642". Bulletin of the Institute of Historical Research (Special Supplement No. 8): 20–21, 37–38.
- J.C. Sainty (1979). List of Lieutenants of Counties of England and Wales 1660-1974. London: Swift Printers (Sales) Ltd.
