= Lord Lieutenant of Cardiganshire =

Welsh county ceremonial officer

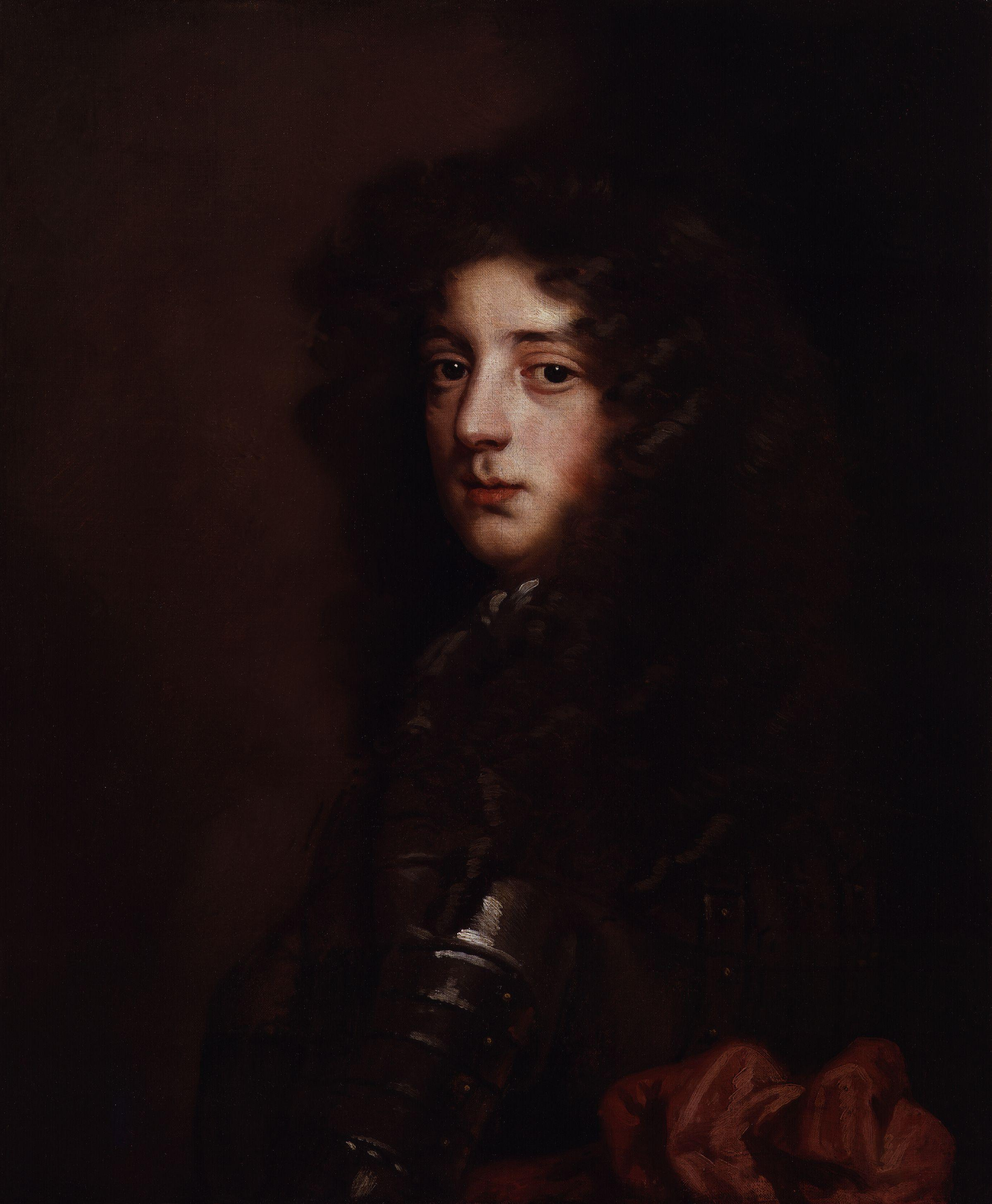
Thomas Herbert

This is a list of people who served as Lord Lieutenant of Cardiganshire. After 1780, all Lord Lieutenants were also Custos Rotulorum of Cardiganshire. The office was abolished on 31 March 1974, and replaced by the Lord Lieutenant of Dyfed.

== Lord Lieutenants of Cardiganshire to 1974 ==
- see Lord Lieutenant of Wales before 1694
- Thomas Herbert, 8th Earl of Pembroke 11 May 1694 – 2 October 1715
- John Vaughan, 1st Viscount Lisburne 2 October 1715 – 1721
- John Vaughan, 2nd Viscount Lisburne 26 July 1721 – 1741
- vacant
- Wilmot Vaughan, 3rd Viscount Lisburne 10 May 1744 – 27 July 1762
- Wilmot Vaughan, 1st Earl of Lisburne 27 July 1762 – 1800
- Thomas Johnes 4 July 1800 – 25 April 1816
- William Edward Powell 22 November 1817 – 10 April 1854
- Thomas Lloyd 16 September 1854 – 12 July 1857
- Edward Pryse 14 September 1857 – 29 May 1888
- Herbert Davies-Evans 16 July 1888 – 28 December 1923
- Ernest Vaughan, 7th Earl of Lisburne 28 December 1923 – 9 May 1956
- John Hext Lewes, 9 May 1956 – 31 March 1974
