= 1879 in Wales =

- Centuries: 17th; 18th; 19th; 20th; 21st
- Decades: 1850s; 1860s; 1870s; 1880s; 1890s
- See also: List of years in Wales; Timeline of Welsh history 1879 in The United Kingdom Scotland Elsewhere

This article is about the particular significance of the year 1879 to Wales and its people.

== Incumbents ==
- Archdruid of the National Eisteddfod of Wales – Clwydfardd
- Lord Lieutenant of Anglesey – William Owen Stanley
- Lord Lieutenant of Brecknockshire – Joseph Bailey, 1st Baron Glanusk
- Lord Lieutenant of Caernarvonshire – Edward Douglas-Pennant, 1st Baron Penrhyn
- Lord Lieutenant of Cardiganshire – Edward Pryse
- Lord Lieutenant of Carmarthenshire – John Campbell, 2nd Earl Cawdor
- Lord Lieutenant of Denbighshire – William Cornwallis-West
- Lord Lieutenant of Flintshire – Hugh Robert Hughes
- Lord Lieutenant of Glamorgan – Christopher Rice Mansel Talbot
- Lord Lieutenant of Merionethshire – Edward Lloyd-Mostyn, 2nd Baron Mostyn
- Lord Lieutenant of Monmouthshire – Henry Somerset, 8th Duke of Beaufort
- Lord Lieutenant of Montgomeryshire – Edward Herbert, 3rd Earl of Powis
- Lord Lieutenant of Pembrokeshire – William Edwardes, 4th Baron Kensington
- Lord Lieutenant of Radnorshire – Arthur Walsh, 2nd Baron Ormathwaite
- Bishop of Bangor – James Colquhoun Campbell
- Bishop of Llandaff – Alfred Ollivant
- Bishop of St Asaph – Joshua Hughes
- Bishop of St Davids – Basil Jones

== Events ==
- 13 January – In a mining accident at Dinas Colliery, Llantrisant in the Rhondda, 63 men are killed.
- 22–23 January – Rorke's Drift is successfully defended by 139 British soldiers from the South Wales Borderers against an assault by 3,000 to 4,000 Zulu warriors.
- 2 May – Eleven Victoria Crosses are awarded to soldiers active in the defence of Rorke's Drift, the recipients including Privates John Williams and Robert Jones.
- 1 September – The ballroom of the Lord Nelson Hotel in Milford Haven becomes the first in the UK to be lit by electricity.
- 22 September – In a mining accident at Waunllwyd, Ebbw Vale, 84 men are killed.
- 3 October – Pryce Pryce-Jones opens his Royal Welsh Warehouse at Newtown, Montgomeryshire.
- 17 October – Official opening of the Severn Railway Bridge in Gloucestershire (destroyed in 1960).
- 29 November – Stradey Park opens as the home of Llanelli RFC. It remains the home for Llanelli RFC for nearly 130 years, and later for the regional side Scarlets, but closes in November 2008 when the teams' new home, Parc y Scarlets, opens in nearby Pemberton.
- date unknown
  - Railway engine drivers and firemen from Griffithstown form a craft union which becomes the Associated Society of Locomotive Engineers and Firemen.
  - The Croesor Tramway becomes the Portmadoc, Croesor and Beddgelert Tram Railway.
  - Butter (General) Market in Wrexham opens.
  - Welsh draper D H Evans opens his shop in London's Oxford Street.

== Arts and literature ==
=== New books ===
==== English language ====
- D. Walter Thomas & Edward Hughes – The Cymric language
- Brinley Richards – The Songs of Wales (Royal Edition)

==== Welsh language ====
- Beriah Gwynfe Evans – Owain Glyndwr (play)
- Daniel Owen – Offrymau Neilltuaeth

=== Music ===
- Joseph Parry
  - "Aberystwyth" (first published)
  - "Man of Sorrows"
- Edward Stephen – Ail Lyfr Tonau ac Emynau ("The Second Book of Tunes and Hymns")

== Sport ==
- Football
  - 18 January – Wales play England for the first time, at Kennington Oval. Wales lose 2–1, but see their first international goal, scored by William Davies.
  - Newtown win the Welsh Cup in the second year of its existence.
- Rugby union
  - 18 January – Treherbert RFC play Cardiff for the first time.
  - Brecon RFC and Ebbw Vale RFC are founded.
- Tennis – The first tennis club in Wales is formed by the Newport Athletic Club.

== Births ==
- 1 January
  - Ernest Jones, psychiatrist (died 1958)
  - Willie Llewellyn, Wales international rugby union (died 1973)
- 15 March – David John Thomas, Wales international rugby union (died 1925)
- 7 April – Philip Turnbull, hockey player (died 1930)
- 23 June – Percy Bush, Wales international rugby union player (died 1955)
- 8 August – Arthur Harding, Wales international rugby union captain (died 1947)
- 28 August – E. E. Clive, actor and director (died 1940 in Hollywood)
- 29 August – Donough O'Brien, cricketer (died 1953)
- 3 September – Illtyd Buller Pole-Evans, botanist (died 1968)
- 4 September – Eliot Crawshay-Williams, politician and writer (died 1962)
- 12 September – Rupert Davies, Welsh-Canadian politician (died 1967)
- 2 October – Idris Bell, papyrologist (died 1967)
- 6 November – George Daggar MP, politician (died 1950)
- 9 November – S. O. Davies, politician (died 1972)

== Deaths ==
- 22 January – John Vivian, MP, English-born member of the Vivian family, 60
- 20 February – John Orlando Parry, actor, pianist, artist, comedian and singer, 69
- 5 March – John Davies of Nercwys, minister and writer, 79
- 28 March – Robert Jones, Anglican priest and writer, 69
- 10 May – Robert Thompson Crawshay, ironmaster, 62
- 14 May – Thomas Nicholas, antiquary, 63
- 13 August – Edward Edwards, zoologist, 75
- 25 August – John Evans, Welsh-born Canadian politician, 63
- 23 September – Francis Kilvert, diarist, 39
- 11 December – William Thomas (Gwilym Marles), minister and writer, uncle of Dylan Thomas, 45

== See also ==
- 1879 in Ireland
