= 1875 in Wales =

- Centuries: 17th; 18th; 19th; 20th; 21st
- Decades: 1850s; 1860s; 1870s; 1880s; 1890s
- See also: List of years in Wales; Timeline of Welsh history 1875 in The United Kingdom Scotland Elsewhere

This article is about the particular significance of the year 1875 to Wales and its people.

== Incumbents ==
- Lord Lieutenant of Anglesey – William Owen Stanley
- Lord Lieutenant of Brecknockshire – Charles Morgan, 1st Baron Tredegar (until 16 April); Joseph Bailey, 1st Baron Glanusk (from 11 June)
- Lord Lieutenant of Caernarvonshire – Edward Douglas-Pennant, 1st Baron Penrhyn
- Lord Lieutenant of Cardiganshire – Edward Pryse
- Lord Lieutenant of Carmarthenshire – John Campbell, 2nd Earl Cawdor
- Lord Lieutenant of Denbighshire – William Cornwallis-West
- Lord Lieutenant of Flintshire – Hugh Robert Hughes
- Lord Lieutenant of Glamorgan – Christopher Rice Mansel Talbot
- Lord Lieutenant of Merionethshire – Edward Lloyd-Mostyn, 2nd Baron Mostyn
- Lord Lieutenant of Monmouthshire – Henry Somerset, 8th Duke of Beaufort
- Lord Lieutenant of Montgomeryshire – Sudeley Hanbury-Tracy, 3rd Baron Sudeley
- Lord Lieutenant of Pembrokeshire – William Edwardes, 4th Baron Kensington
- Lord Lieutenant of Radnorshire – John Walsh, 1st Baron Ormathwaite (until 21 April); Arthur Walsh, 2nd Baron Ormathwaite (from 21 April)
- Bishop of Bangor – James Colquhoun Campbell
- Bishop of Llandaff – Alfred Ollivant
- Bishop of St Asaph – Joshua Hughes
- Bishop of St Davids – Basil Jones

== Events ==
- August - First publication of The Usk Gleaner and Monmouthshire Record.
- December - South Wales miners, led by William Abraham, come to agreement on a sliding scale of wages in relation to prices and profits.
- 4 December - In a mining accident at Old Pit, New Tredegar, 22 men are killed.
- 5 December - In a mining accident at Llan Colliery, Pentyrch, twelve men are killed.
- unknown dates
  - The first imports of North American wheat come through Cardiff.
  - The United States Immigration and Naturalization Service recognises Welsh as a distinct nationality - the first official body ever to do so.
  - Ordnance Survey publishes the first complete maps of Wales.
  - David Davies Llandinam is elected treasurer of the University of Wales.
  - Major eisteddfod held at Pwllheli. Future archdruid Rowland Williams (Hwfa Môn) is a leading adjudicator.
  - Francis Wallace Grenfell takes part in the expedition which claims Griqualand West (site of the Kimberley diamond fields) for the UK.
  - Bodnant Garden is begun by Baron Aberconway.

== Arts and literature ==
- Christopher Rice Mansel Talbot buys James Milo Griffith's Summer Flowers for Margam Castle.

=== New books ===
==== English language ====
- Hugh Owen Thomas - Diseases of the Hip, Knee, and Ankle Joints

==== Welsh language ====
- William Ambrose - Gweithiau y Parch. W. Ambrose (posthumously published)
- David Stephen Davies - Adroddiad
- Isaac Foulkes - Y Ddau Efell, neu Llanllonydd
- Owen Jones (Meudwy Môn) (ed.) - Cymru, yn Hanesyddol, Parthedegol, a Bywgraphyddol
- John Goronwy Mathias - Y Dywysen Aeddfed
- Evan Rees (Dyfed) - Caniadau Dyfedfab

=== Music ===
- Robert Griffiths becomes the first secretary of the tonic solfa college.
- Joseph Parry composes the music to Myfanwy.
- Sarah Edith Wynne marries and retires from her singing career.

== Sport ==
- Rugby union - Llanelli RFC and Risca RFC are formed.
- Yachting - Bristol Channel Yacht Club is formed in Swansea.

== Births ==
- 3 January - Cliff Bowen, Wales international rugby player and county cricketer (died 1929)
- 4 January – William Williams (Crwys), poet and Archdruid (died 1968)
- 19 January – Thomas Owen Jones, dramatist, actor and producer (died 1941)
- 23 February – David Brazell, singer (died 1959)
- 4 March – John Kelt Edwards, cartoonist (died 1934)
- 23 May – Nathaniel Walters, Wales international rugby player (died 1956)
- 26 May – Jack Evans, Wales international rugby player (died 1947)
- 31 May – Daniel Jones, Wales international rugby player (died 1959)
- 11 June – Will Osborne, Wales international rugby player (died 1942)
- 16 June – Henry Paget, Lord Paget, eccentric, born in Paris (died 1905)
- 10 September
  - John Evans, politician (died 1961)
  - Harry Vaughan Watkins, Wales international rugby player (died 1945)
- 26 October – Sir Lewis Casson, English-born artist (died 1969)
- 20 December (in Shirley, Derbyshire) – T. F. Powys, Anglo-Welsh writer (died 1953)
- 25 December – George Davies, international rugby player (died 1959)

== Deaths ==
- 4 January – Thomas Stephens, historian, literary critic and social reformer (born 1821)
- 4 March – John Evans (I. D. Ffraid), minister and author, 60
- April – Frances Bunsen, painter, 85
- 16 April – Charles Morgan, 1st Baron Tredegar, Lord Lieutenant of Brecknockshire, 83
- 19 July – Benjamin Davies, Hebraist, 60/61
- 27 July – Connop Thirlwall, former Bishop of St Davids, 78
- 19 August – Robert Elis (Cynddelw), writer, 63
- 28 August – Sir Richard Williams-Bulkeley, 10th Baronet, politician, 73
- 7 September – John Prichard, minister, author and teacher, 79
- 16 September (in Shropshire) – Lucy Herbert, Countess of Powis, Scottish-born aristocrat, 81
- 29 November – Thomas Jones, librarian, 65
- date unknown
  - David Davies, composer, about 65
  - (in London) – Fanny Parkes, travel writer, 81

== See also ==
- 1875 in Ireland
