= 1882 in Wales =

- Centuries: 17th; 18th; 19th; 20th; 21st
- Decades: 1860s; 1870s; 1880s; 1890s; 1900s
- See also: List of years in Wales; Timeline of Welsh history 1882 in The United Kingdom Scotland Elsewhere

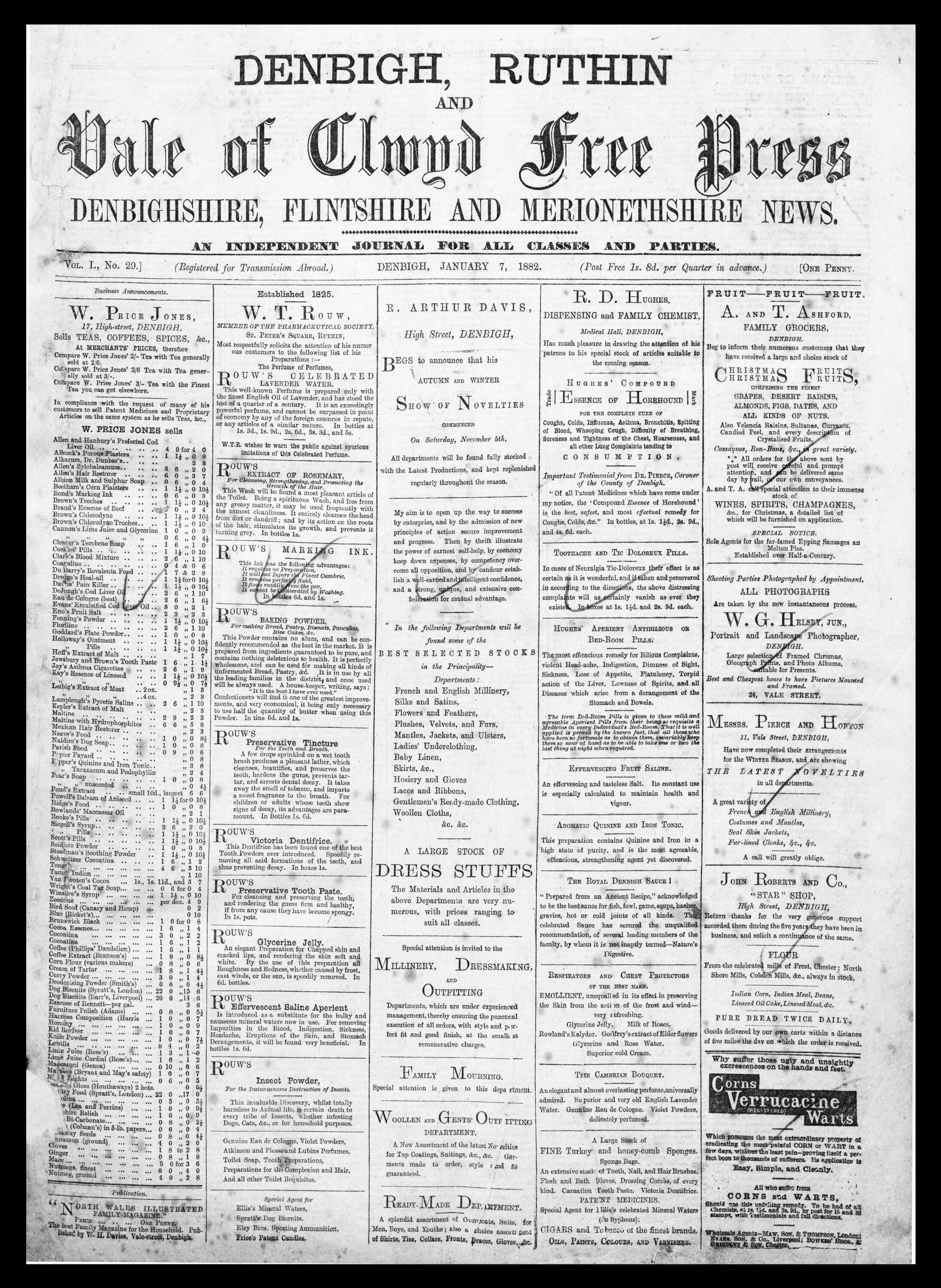
First article of the Denbigh, Ruthin and Vale of Clwyd Free Press, released in 1882.

This article is about the particular significance of the year 1882 to Wales and its people.

== Incumbents ==
- Archdruid of the National Eisteddfod of Wales – Clwydfardd
- Lord Lieutenant of Anglesey – William Owen Stanley
- Lord Lieutenant of Brecknockshire – Joseph Bailey, 1st Baron Glanusk
- Lord Lieutenant of Caernarvonshire – Edward Douglas-Pennant, 1st Baron Penrhyn
- Lord Lieutenant of Cardiganshire – Edward Pryse
- Lord Lieutenant of Carmarthenshire – John Campbell, 2nd Earl Cawdor
- Lord Lieutenant of Denbighshire – William Cornwallis-West
- Lord Lieutenant of Flintshire – Hugh Robert Hughes
- Lord Lieutenant of Glamorgan – Christopher Rice Mansel Talbot
- Lord Lieutenant of Merionethshire – Edward Lloyd-Mostyn, 2nd Baron Mostyn
- Lord Lieutenant of Monmouthshire – Henry Somerset, 8th Duke of Beaufort
- Lord Lieutenant of Montgomeryshire – Edward Herbert, 3rd Earl of Powis
- Lord Lieutenant of Pembrokeshire – William Edwardes, 4th Baron Kensington
- Lord Lieutenant of Radnorshire – Arthur Walsh, 2nd Baron Ormathwaite
- Bishop of Bangor – James Colquhoun Campbell
- Bishop of Llandaff – Alfred Ollivant (until 16 December);
- Bishop of St Asaph – Joshua Hughes
- Bishop of St Davids – Basil Jones

== Events ==
- 10 January – The vessels Constancia and Primus attempt to pass through a lock at Newport Docks at the same time and a collision results. The lock is blocked and the vessels already in the dock are trapped for nearly two weeks. The resulting losses eventually culminate in the demise of the Newport Dock Company a year later.
- February – Charles Wilkins launches the English-language periodical The Red Dragon in Cardiff.
- 11 February – Six miners are killed in an accident at the Lewis Merthyr Colliery.
- 3 March – Five miners are killed in an accident at the Henwaen Colliery, Blaina.
- 20 October
  - The steamer Clan MacDuff sinks off Holyhead, resulting in 32 deaths.
  - The Victory, a Bideford schooner carrying coal from Cardiff to Waterford, sinks near Ballyteique with the loss of all crew.
- 1 November – An Austrian barque, the Petroslava, is wrecked on Skokholm with the loss of 10 of its 11 crew members.
- 16 November – The new Fishguard Lifeboat Station boat Sir Edward Perrott is launched 5 times and rescues 46 lives from 15 different vessels.
- Anti-Irish riots break out at Tredegar.
- Lager is brewed at Wrexham, for the first time in the UK.
- Brains Brewery opens in Cardiff.
- St Catharine's Church, Baglan, is consecrated.
- The Welsh Charity School in Ashford, Surrey, becomes girls-only and changes its name to the Welsh Girls' School.
- Plymouth Ironworks at Merthyr Tydfil is closed.
- Slate workings in Cwm Llan on Snowdon are closed because of the expense of transporting the slate to a port.

== Arts and literature ==
The Cambrian Academy of Art becomes the 'Royal Cambrian Academy of Art' after gaining patronage from Queen Victoria.

== Awards ==
National Eisteddfod of Wales – held at Denbigh

- Chair – No Winner
- Crown – Dafydd Rees Williams

=== New books ===
- Richard Davies (Mynyddog) – Pedwerydd Llyfr Mynyddog
- Frances Hoggan – Education for Girls in Wales

== Sport ==
- Football
  - 25 February - John Price becomes the first Welsh footballer to score a hat-trick in an international match, when he produces four of the goals in a 7–1 win against Ireland.
  - Druids win the Welsh Cup for the third time in its five-year history.
- Rugby Union
  - Bargoed RFC, Loughor RFC, Pentyrch RFC and Pontardawe RFC are formed.
  - First Wales national game against Ireland. Result sees first Welsh victory and first points scored, by Newport's Thomas Baker Jones.

== Births ==
- 3 January – Johnnie Williams, Wales international rugby player (died 1916)
- 3 February – Arthur Jenkins, politician (died 1946)
- 3 February – Harry Wetter, Wales international rugby union player (died 1934)
- 11 February – Gwendoline Davies, patron of the arts (died 1951)
- 5 April – Howell Jones, Wales international rugby player (died 1908)
- 7 May – Reggie Gibbs, Wales international rugby player (died 1938)
- 24 July – Reginald Clarry, politician (died 1945)
- 6 September – Tommy Vile, Wales international rugby player (died 1958)
- 14 September – Jack Powell, Wales international rugby player (died 1941)
- 30 September – Charlie Pritchard, Wales international rugby player (died 1916)
- 13 October – Trevor Preece, cricketer (died 1965)
- 6 November – David Rees Griffiths, poet (died 1953)
- 8 November – Jack Williams, Wales international rugby player (died 1911)
- 21 November – Harold Lowe, officer on board RMS Titanic (died 1944)
- 16 December – Cyril Fox, archaeologist (died 1967)
- 31 December – Tom Evans, Wales international rugby player (died 1955)
- date unknown – Ivor Lewis, artist (died 1958)

== Deaths ==
- 9 January – Joseph Edwards, sculptor, 69
- 8 March – William Bulkeley Hughes, politician, 84
- 30 March – William Menelaus, ironworks manager, 64
- 21 April – George Grant Francis, antiquary, 68
- 20 June – David Thomas, industrialist, 87
- 24 June – Thomas Jones, poet-preacher, 62
- 15 July – John Petherick, engineer and traveller, 69
- 24 August – John Dillwyn Llewelyn, botanist and photographer, 72
- 8 October – Mary Davies (Mair Eifion), poet, 35
- 21 November – Banastyre Pryce Lloyd, linguist and civil servant, 58
- 16 December – Alfred Ollivant, Bishop of Llandaff, 84

== See also ==
- 1882 in Ireland
