= 1877 in Wales =

- Centuries: 17th; 18th; 19th; 20th; 21st
- Decades: 1850s; 1860s; 1870s; 1880s; 1890s
- See also: List of years in Wales; Timeline of Welsh history 1877 in The United Kingdom Scotland Elsewhere

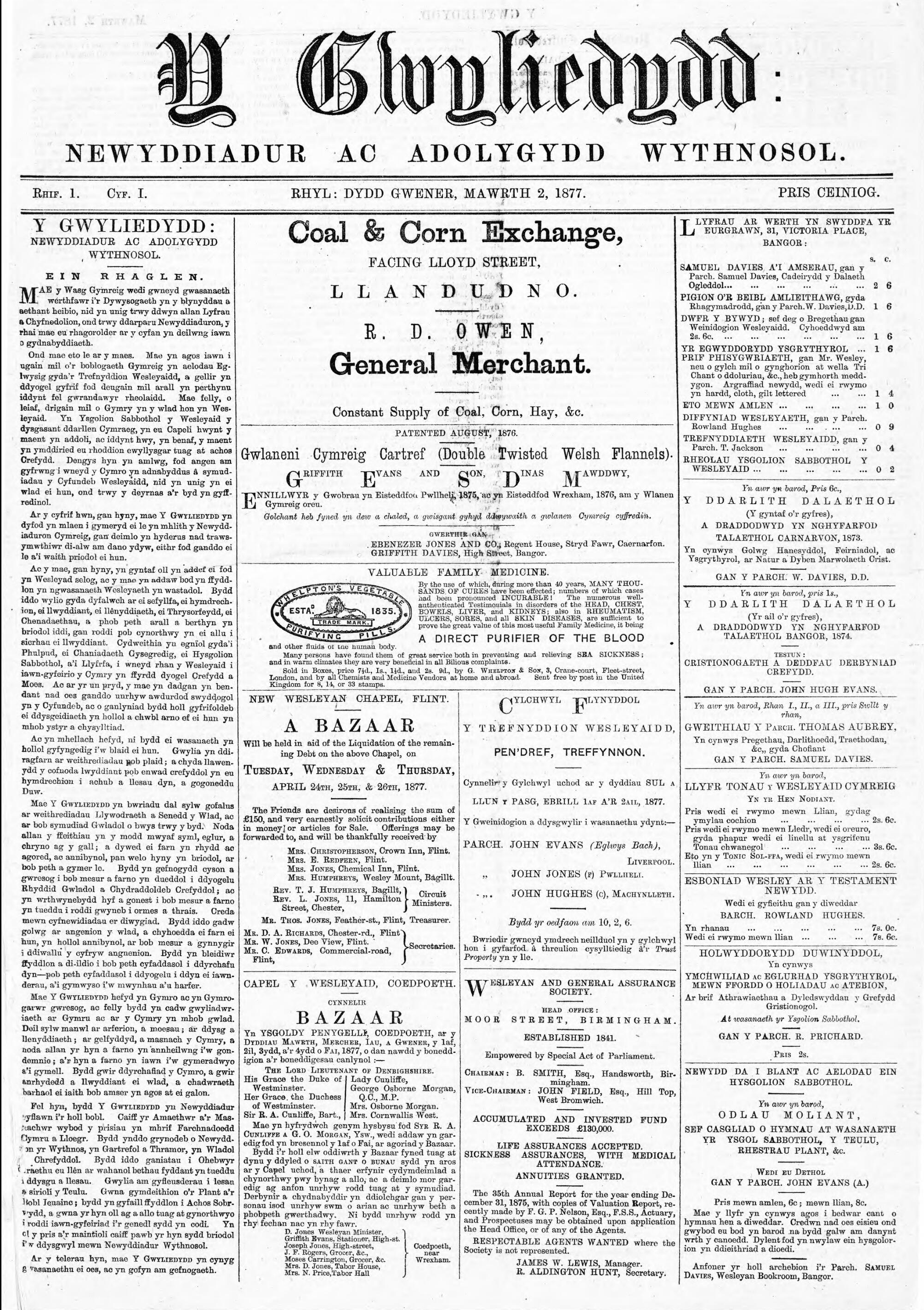

This article is about the particular significance of the year 1877 to Wales and its people.

== Incumbents ==
- Lord Lieutenant of Anglesey – William Owen Stanley
- Lord Lieutenant of Brecknockshire – Joseph Bailey, 1st Baron Glanusk
- Lord Lieutenant of Caernarvonshire – Edward Douglas-Pennant, 1st Baron Penrhyn
- Lord Lieutenant of Cardiganshire – Edward Pryse
- Lord Lieutenant of Carmarthenshire – John Campbell, 2nd Earl Cawdor
- Lord Lieutenant of Denbighshire – William Cornwallis-West
- Lord Lieutenant of Flintshire – Hugh Robert Hughes
- Lord Lieutenant of Glamorgan – Christopher Rice Mansel Talbot
- Lord Lieutenant of Merionethshire – Edward Lloyd-Mostyn, 2nd Baron Mostyn
- Lord Lieutenant of Monmouthshire – Henry Somerset, 8th Duke of Beaufort
- Lord Lieutenant of Montgomeryshire – Sudeley Hanbury-Tracy, 3rd Baron Sudeley
- Lord Lieutenant of Pembrokeshire – William Edwardes, 4th Baron Kensington
- Lord Lieutenant of Radnorshire – Arthur Walsh, 2nd Baron Ormathwaite
- Bishop of Bangor – James Colquhoun Campbell
- Bishop of Llandaff – Alfred Ollivant
- Bishop of St Asaph – Joshua Hughes
- Bishop of St Davids – Basil Jones
- Archdruid of the National Eisteddfod of Wales – Clwydfardd

== Events ==
- 8 March – In an explosion at Worcester Colliery, Swansea, seventeen men are killed.
- 11 April – In the Tynewydd Colliery disaster in the Rhondda, five men are killed by flooding. Twenty-five of the rescue team are awarded the Albert Medal for Lifesaving, the first time this is awarded for service on land, and the first BMA medal is awarded to Dr Henry Naunton Davies.
- 10 July – Consecration of new Merthyr Synagogue, the oldest surviving synagogue building in Wales.
- 1 August – Opening of new Llandudno Pier.
- 15 August – Opening to passengers of the North Wales Narrow Gauge Railways from Dinas to Tryfan Junction and Bryngwyn.
- 30 November – Opening of the new market hall at Builth Wells by Sir Joseph Bailey M.P.
- unknown dates
  - Opening of Stepaside, Pembrokeshire village school (part of modern-day Stepaside Heritage Park).
  - Closure of lead mine at Loggerheads, Denbighshire.

== Arts and literature ==
- Islwyn wins a bardic chair at Treherbert.

=== New books ===
- Richard Davies (Mynyddog) – Y Trydydd Cynnig
- William Rees (Gwilym Hiraethog) – Helyntion Bywyd Hen Deiliwr

=== Music ===
- Joseph Parry resigns from his position as Professor of Music at University of Wales, Aberystwyth.

== Sport ==
- Football
  - The Racecourse Ground at Wrexham hosts Wales' first ever home international match, making it the world's oldest international football stadium still to host international matches.
  - The Welsh Cup is inaugurated.
- Rugby union
  - 8 November – Blaenavon RFC play their first game, against Abergavenny.

== Births ==
- 2 May – Sid Bevan, Welsh international rugby union player (died 1933)
- 6 June (in Guernsey) – Herbert John Fleure, zoologist and geographer (died 1969)
- 9 June – George Travers, Wales international rugby union player (died 1945)
- 21 June – Elizabeth Mary Jones (Moelona), Welsh-language children's novelist (died 1953)
- 1 July – Llewellyn Lloyd, Wales international rugby union player (died 1957)
- 19 August – John Evans, supercentenarian (died 1990)
- 17 September – Henry Seymour Berry, 1st Baron Buckland, industrialist (died 1928)
- 26 September (in Wandsworth) – Edmund Gwenn, actor (died 1959) (long believed to have been born in Wales)
- 5 October – Lily Gower, croquet player (died 1959)
- 27 October – David Harris Davies, Wales international rugby union player (died 1944)
- 7 November – Maurice Parry, footballer (died 1935)
- 27 November – Leigh Richmond Roose, football goalkeeper (killed in battle 1916)
- 2 December – John Strand-Jones, Wales international rugby union player (died 1958)

== Deaths ==
- 9 January – Thomas Thomas, clergyman, 72
- 24 June – Robert Dale Owen, Welsh-American politician, 75
- 14 July – Richard Davies (Mynyddog), poet, 44
- 18 July – Thomas Richards, "father of Tasmanian journalism", 77
- 27 July – John Frost, Chartist leader, 93
- 5 August – Robert Williams (Trebor Mai), poet, 47
- 17 October – Charles Williams, academic, 73?
- 7 November – Calvert Jones, painter and pioneer photographer, 72
- 13 December – John Griffith (journalist), journalist who wrote under the pseudonym Y Gohebydd, 56

== See also ==
- 1877 in Ireland
