= 1883 in Wales =

- Centuries: 17th; 18th; 19th; 20th; 21st
- Decades: 1860s; 1870s; 1880s; 1890s; 1900s
- See also: List of years in Wales; Timeline of Welsh history 1883 in The United Kingdom Scotland Elsewhere

This article is about the particular significance of the year 1883 to Wales and its people.

== Incumbents ==
- Archdruid of the National Eisteddfod of Wales – Clwydfardd
- Lord Lieutenant of Anglesey – William Owen Stanley
- Lord Lieutenant of Brecknockshire – Joseph Bailey, 1st Baron Glanusk
- Lord Lieutenant of Caernarvonshire – Edward Douglas-Pennant, 1st Baron Penrhyn
- Lord Lieutenant of Cardiganshire – Edward Pryse
- Lord Lieutenant of Carmarthenshire – John Campbell, 2nd Earl Cawdor
- Lord Lieutenant of Denbighshire – William Cornwallis-West
- Lord Lieutenant of Flintshire – Hugh Robert Hughes
- Lord Lieutenant of Glamorgan – Christopher Rice Mansel Talbot
- Lord Lieutenant of Merionethshire – Edward Lloyd-Mostyn, 2nd Baron Mostyn
- Lord Lieutenant of Monmouthshire – Henry Somerset, 8th Duke of Beaufort
- Lord Lieutenant of Montgomeryshire – Edward Herbert, 3rd Earl of Powis
- Lord Lieutenant of Pembrokeshire – William Edwardes, 4th Baron Kensington
- Lord Lieutenant of Radnorshire – Arthur Walsh, 2nd Baron Ormathwaite
- Bishop of Bangor – James Colquhoun Campbell
- Bishop of Llandaff – Richard Lewis (from 25 April)
- Bishop of St Asaph – Joshua Hughes
- Bishop of St Davids – Basil Jones

== Events ==
- 27 January – In the same storm, the James Gray is wrecked on Tusker Rocks, Porthcawl, and the Agnes Jack off Port Eynon. The Mumbles lifeboat puts out, and 5 of its crew are drowned in the rescue attempt, in which Jessie Ace and Margaret Wright assist.
- 16 February – Six million tons of rock collapse at the Welsh Slate Company's underground quarry at Blaenau Ffestiniog.
- 1 February – Five miners are killed in an accident at the Lewis Merthyr Colliery.
- 25 June – Six miners are killed in an accident at the New Duffryn Colliery, Rhymney.
- July – The steamship Rishanglys leaves three seamen, who are believed to be suffering from cholera, on the island of Flat Holm; one of them subsequently dies.
- 21 August – Five miners are killed in an accident at the Gelli Colliery, Gelli, Glamorgan.
- 24 October – Cardiff University opens (under the name of University College of South Wales and Monmouthshire).
- 31 October – 18 people are drowned when the German barque Alhambra sinks off Holyhead.
- 13 November – Merthyr Tydfil-born Samuel Griffith becomes Premier of Queensland for the first time.
- c. November? – Closure of Point of Ayr lighthouse.
- Peak year for zinc production in Wales.
- Penydarren Ironworks closes completely.
- Welsh-Canadian artist Robert Harris is commissioned to paint the Meeting of the Delegates of British North America.

== Arts and literature ==
=== Awards ===
National Eisteddfod of Wales – held at Cardiff

- Chair – No winner
- Crown – Anna Walter Thomas

=== New books ===
- Rhoda Broughton – Belinda
- Amy Dillwyn – A Burglary; or Unconscious Influence
- John Jones (Myrddin Fardd) – Adgof Uwch Anghof
- Robert Owen – Pilgrimage to Rome
- Robert Williams (Trebor Mai) – Gwaith Barddonol Trebor Mai (posthumously published)

=== Music ===
- Treorchy Male Voice Choir formed.

== Sport ==
- Football – Wrexham win the Welsh Cup for the second time in its six-year history.
- Rugby union
  - Wales take part in the inaugural Home Nations Championship
  - First home international game played, hosted at St. Helen's Rugby and Cricket Ground in Swansea.
  - First Wales match against Scotland. Wales lose by three goals to one.

== Births ==
- 6 January (in Shirehampton) – Harry Uzzell, Wales international rugby union captain (died 1960)
- 23 March – William Evans, Wales dual-code international rugby player (died 1946)
- 30 April – David John de Lloyd, composer (died 1948)
- 7 May – Gomer Berry, 1st Viscount Kemsley, newspaper magnate (died 1968)
- 12 May (in Glasgow) – James Walker, MP for Newport 1929–31 (died 1945)
- 28 May (in Gayton) – Clough Williams-Ellis, architect (died 1978)
- 12 June (in London) – Margaret Mackworth, 2nd Viscountess Rhondda, suffragette (died 1958)
- 8 August – Iesu Grist Price, son of William Price (died 1884)
- 13 September (in South Shields) – Percy Thomas, architect (died 1969)
- 14 October – Dick Thomas, Wales international rugby player (died 1916)
- 23 November – James 'Tuan' Jones, Wales and British Lion rugby player (died 1964)
- 13 December – Sir Frederick Rees, historian and academic (died 1967)
- date unknown – John Jones (Tydu), poet (died 1968)

== Deaths ==
- 25 January – John Elias Davies, harpist, 35
- 29 January
  - John Owen (Owain Alaw), composer, 61
  - Owen Gethin Jones, industrialist and poet, 66
- May – John Batchelor, businessman and politician, 63
- 28 May – Hugh Jones, Principal of Llangollen Baptist College, 51
- 18 August – Roger Vaughan, Benedictine monk and priest, Archbishop of Sydney, 49
- 5 November – James Walton, Yorkshire-born textile inventor and industrialist, 80
- 8 November – William Rees (Gwilym Hiraethog), poet, 81
- 25 December – Townshend Mainwaring, politician, 76

== See also ==
- 1883 in Ireland
