= 1876 in Wales =

- Centuries: 17th; 18th; 19th; 20th; 21st
- Decades: 1850s; 1860s; 1870s; 1880s; 1890s
- See also: List of years in Wales; Timeline of Welsh history 1876 in The United Kingdom Scotland Elsewhere

This article is about the particular significance of the year 1876 to Wales and its people.

== Incumbents ==
- Lord Lieutenant of Anglesey – William Owen Stanley
- Lord Lieutenant of Brecknockshire – Joseph Bailey, 1st Baron Glanusk
- Lord Lieutenant of Caernarvonshire – Edward Douglas-Pennant, 1st Baron Penrhyn
- Lord Lieutenant of Cardiganshire – Edward Pryse
- Lord Lieutenant of Carmarthenshire – John Campbell, 2nd Earl Cawdor
- Lord Lieutenant of Denbighshire – William Cornwallis-West
- Lord Lieutenant of Flintshire – Hugh Robert Hughes
- Lord Lieutenant of Glamorgan – Christopher Rice Mansel Talbot
- Lord Lieutenant of Merionethshire – Edward Lloyd-Mostyn, 2nd Baron Mostyn
- Lord Lieutenant of Monmouthshire – Henry Somerset, 8th Duke of Beaufort
- Lord Lieutenant of Montgomeryshire – Sudeley Hanbury-Tracy, 3rd Baron Sudeley
- Lord Lieutenant of Pembrokeshire – William Edwardes, 4th Baron Kensington
- Lord Lieutenant of Radnorshire – Arthur Walsh, 2nd Baron Ormathwaite
- Bishop of Bangor – James Colquhoun Campbell
- Bishop of Llandaff – Alfred Ollivant
- Bishop of St Asaph – Joshua Hughes
- Bishop of St Davids – Basil Jones
- Archdruid of the National Eisteddfod of Wales – Clwydfardd (first official holder of the position

== Events ==
- January – The Argentine government appoints Antonio Oneto as civil authority over the Welsh colony in Patagonia, the population of which numbers 690.
- 9 January – The death of John Russell, Viscount Amberley, leaves Bertrand Russell an orphan.
- 19 May – Sir Edmund Buckley, 1st Baronet, files for bankruptcy in Manchester with debts exceeding £500,000, causing his Dinas Mawddwy estate to be put up for sale.
- June – Francis Kilvert becomes vicar of Saint Harmon, Radnorshire.
- 13 July – Act of Parliament allows the North Wales Narrow Gauge Railways Company to abandon plans for a line between Croesor Junction and Betws-y-Coed.
- 22 July – Art Treasures & Industrial Exhibition of North Wales & the Border Counties in Wrexham is opened.
- 19 August – Judge John Johnes is murdered at his home on Dolaucothi Estate by his butler.
- 2 December – Cardiff RFC plays its first match, against Newport.
- 18 December – In a mining accident at South Wales Pit, Abertillery, twenty men are killed.

== Arts and literature ==
=== New books ===
- George Thomas Orlando Bridgeman – History of the Princes of South Wales

=== Music ===
- Eos Bradwen – Bugeiles yr Wyddfa
- Joseph Parry composes the hymn tune Aberystwyth (published 1879) which becomes the basis of the pan-African anthem Nkosi Sikelel' iAfrika

== Sport ==
- Football
  - 2 February – Llewelyn Kenrick sets up the Football Association of Wales in a meeting at the Wynnstay Arms hotel in Wrexham, in response to a challenge issued by The Field magazine, to organize an international match between Wales and Scotland or Ireland.
  - 25 March – Wales play first international football match, against Scotland in Glasgow, losing 4–0.
  - Formation of Caernarfon athletics club, later Caernarfon Town.
- Rugby union – Aberavon RFC, Cardiff RFC, Cardigan RFC, Llandaff RFC, Merthyr RFC and Pontypridd RFC are established.

== Births ==
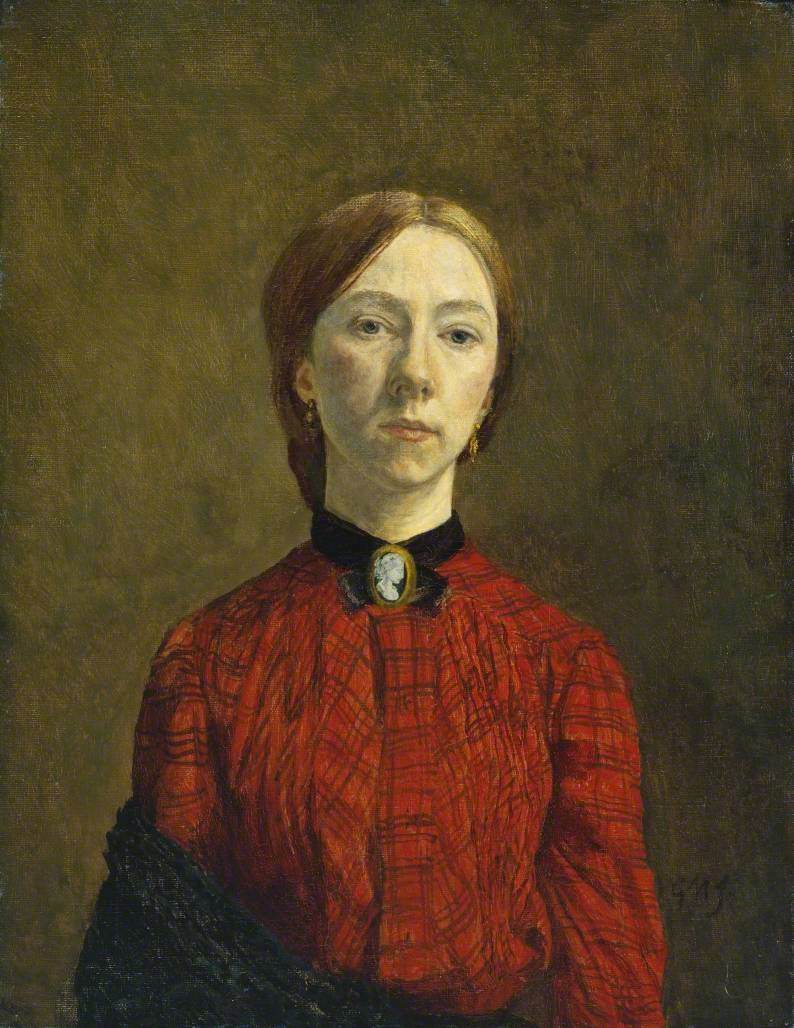
Gwen John

- 7 March – Edgar Evans, naval petty officer and Antarctic explorer (died 1912)
- 19 June – Joe Pullman, Wales international rugby union player (died 1955)
- 22 June – Gwen John, artist (died 1939)
- 15 July
  - Jehoida Hodges, Welsh international rugby union player (died 1930)
  - Jack Rhapps, Dual-code rugby international (died 1950)
- 24 July – Viv Huzzey, Welsh international rugby union player (died 1929)
- 18 September – Charles Kemeys-Tynte, 8th Baron Wharton (died 1934)
- 17 November – Dicky Owen, Welsh international rugby union player (died 1932)

== Deaths ==
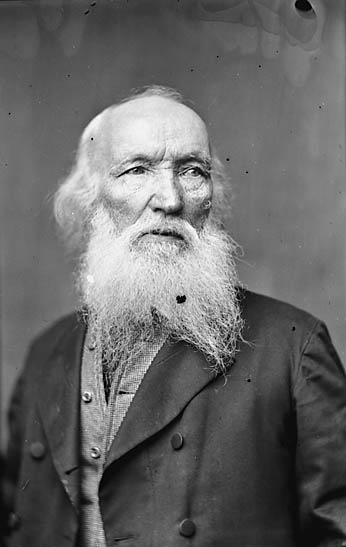
Robert Herbert Williams (Corfanydd, 1805-76) NLW3364191

- 3 January – Rosser Beynon, musician, 64
- 19 February – Daniel Davies, Baptist preacher, 78
- 24 February – Joseph Jenkins Roberts, President of Liberia, son of a Welsh planter, 66
- 23 April (at Karlsruhe) – Frances Bunsen, painter, 85
- 2 May – Daniel Thomas Williams (Tydfylyn), poet and musician (born 1820)
- 15 June – John Ormsby-Gore, 1st Baron Harlech, politician, 60
- 19 July (in the United States) – George E. Pugh, Welsh-American politician, 53
- 8 August – Lady Sarah Elizabeth Hay-Williams, English-born artist and illustrator, 75
- 21 August – C. W. Evan, Congregationalist minister in colonial South Australia, age unknown
- 9 November – John David Jenkins, philanthropist, 58
- 17 November – Thomas Rees (Twm Carnabwth), leader of Rebecca Riots
- 20 November – Robert Herbert Williams (Corfanydd), musician (born 1805)
- 25 December – Adrian Stephens, inventor of the steam whistle, 81
