= 1878 in Wales =

- Centuries: 17th; 18th; 19th; 20th; 21st
- Decades: 1850s; 1860s; 1870s; 1880s; 1890s
- See also: List of years in Wales; Timeline of Welsh history 1878 in The United Kingdom Scotland Elsewhere

This article is about the particular significance of the year 1878 to Wales and its people.

== Incumbents ==
- Archdruid of the National Eisteddfod of Wales – Clwydfardd
- Lord Lieutenant of Anglesey – William Owen Stanley
- Lord Lieutenant of Brecknockshire – Joseph Bailey, 1st Baron Glanusk
- Lord Lieutenant of Caernarvonshire – Edward Douglas-Pennant, 1st Baron Penrhyn
- Lord Lieutenant of Cardiganshire – Edward Pryse
- Lord Lieutenant of Carmarthenshire – John Campbell, 2nd Earl Cawdor
- Lord Lieutenant of Denbighshire – William Cornwallis-West
- Lord Lieutenant of Flintshire – Hugh Robert Hughes
- Lord Lieutenant of Glamorgan – Christopher Rice Mansel Talbot
- Lord Lieutenant of Merionethshire – Edward Lloyd-Mostyn, 2nd Baron Mostyn
- Lord Lieutenant of Monmouthshire – Henry Somerset, 8th Duke of Beaufort
- Lord Lieutenant of Montgomeryshire – Edward Herbert, 3rd Earl of Powis
- Lord Lieutenant of Pembrokeshire – William Edwardes, 4th Baron Kensington
- Lord Lieutenant of Radnorshire – Arthur Walsh, 2nd Baron Ormathwaite
- Bishop of Bangor – James Colquhoun Campbell
- Bishop of Llandaff – Alfred Ollivant
- Bishop of St Asaph – Joshua Hughes
- Bishop of St Davids – Basil Jones

== Events ==
- March
  - The 'basic' process, enabling the use of phosphoric iron ore in steelmaking, developed at the failing Blaenavon Ironworks by Percy Gilchrist and Sidney Gilchrist Thomas, is first made public.
  - The Swansea Improvements and Tramway Company SITC) opens a street tramway from Gower Street, Swansea, to join up with the Oystermouth Railway.
- 16–17 July – Spanish seaman Joseph Garcia, just released from Usk Prison, murders all 5 members of the Watkins family at Llangybi, Monmouthshire.
- 17 July – Swansea tramways are forced by legal action to return to horse-drawn operation after experimenting with steam locomotives.
- 11 September – In a mining accident at the Prince of Wales Colliery, Abercarn, 268 men are killed.
- Founding of Dr Williams School for Girls at Dolgellau with Eliza Ann Fewings as first head.
- Opening of Marine Drive around the Great Orme at Llandudno.
- A passenger ferry service is established between Bangor and Porthaethwy on the Menai Strait.
- Industrialist John Corbett buys Ynysymaengwyn.
- Slate industry in Wales: The Oakeley quarry at Blaenau Ffestiniog absorbs the previously independently-worked Upper and Middle quarries.
- The prison system in Wales is nationalised and brought under centralised government control.
- Nanteos Cup first exhibited.

== Arts and literature ==
=== New books ===
- Daniel Silvan Evans (editor) – Celtic Remains
- William Rees (Gwilym Hiraethog) – Llythyrau 'Rhen Ffarmwr

=== Music ===
- John Owen (Owain Alaw) – Jeremiah (oratorio)

== Sport ==
- Football – The Welsh Cup competition takes place for the first time, and is won by Wrexham.

== Births ==
- 4 January – Augustus John, painter (died 1961)
- 30 January – Reg Skrimshire, Wales and British Lions rugby union player (died 1963)
- 24 February – Lou Phillips, Wales international rugby player (killed in action 1916)
- 3 March – Edward Thomas, poet (killed in action 1917)
- 12 March – Mary Sophia Allen, women's rights activist (died 1964)
- 15 March – Thomas Richards, historian and librarian (died 1962)
- 21 March – Edwin Thomas Maynard, Wales international rugby player (died 1961)
- 16 April – Owen Thomas Jones, geologist (died 1967)
- 26 May – Abel J. Jones, writer (died 1949)
- 5 June – Billy O'Neill, Wales national rugby player (died 1955)
- 8 June – Evan Roberts, religious revivalist (died 1951)
- 20 June – Seymour Farmer, politician in Canada (died 1951)
- 1 July – Billy Trew, rugby player and Welsh Triple Crown winning captain (died 1926)
- 27 August – Edgar Rees Jones, lawyer and politician (died 1962)
- 28 October – Charles Benjamin Redrup, aeronautical engineer (died 1961)
- 30 October – Caradog Roberts, musician (died 1935)
- 8 November – Dorothea Bate, palaeontologist (died 1951)
- 27 November – Dick Jones, Welsh international rugby player (died 1958)
- 31 December – Caradoc Evans, writer (died 1945)
- date unknown – Richard Hughes Williams (Dic Tryfan), Welsh language short story writer (died 1919)

== Deaths ==
- 3 January – Morris Williams (Nicander), writer (born 1809)
- 16 February – Alexander Jones, footballer, 23 (accidentally shot)
- 25 February – Townsend Harris, Welsh-descended American diplomat, 73
- 30 March – Peter Maurice, priest and writer, 74
- 4 July – William Roos, Welsh artist and engraver, 70
- 13 August – Francis Rice, 5th Baron Dynevor, 74
- 30 September – Evan James, poet, lyricist of the Welsh national anthem, 69
- 18 November – John Jones (Mathetes), clergyman and writer, 57
- 20 November – William Thomas (Islwyn), poet, 46
- 25 November – Llewelyn Lewellin, clergyman and academic, 80
- 5 December – David Price, minister, 67
- 13 December – David Charles, secretary of the University for Wales movement, 56

== See also ==
- 1878 in Ireland
