= 1881 in Wales =

- Centuries: 17th; 18th; 19th; 20th; 21st
- Decades: 1860s; 1870s; 1880s; 1890s; 1900s
- See also: List of years in Wales; Timeline of Welsh history 1881 in The United Kingdom Scotland Elsewhere

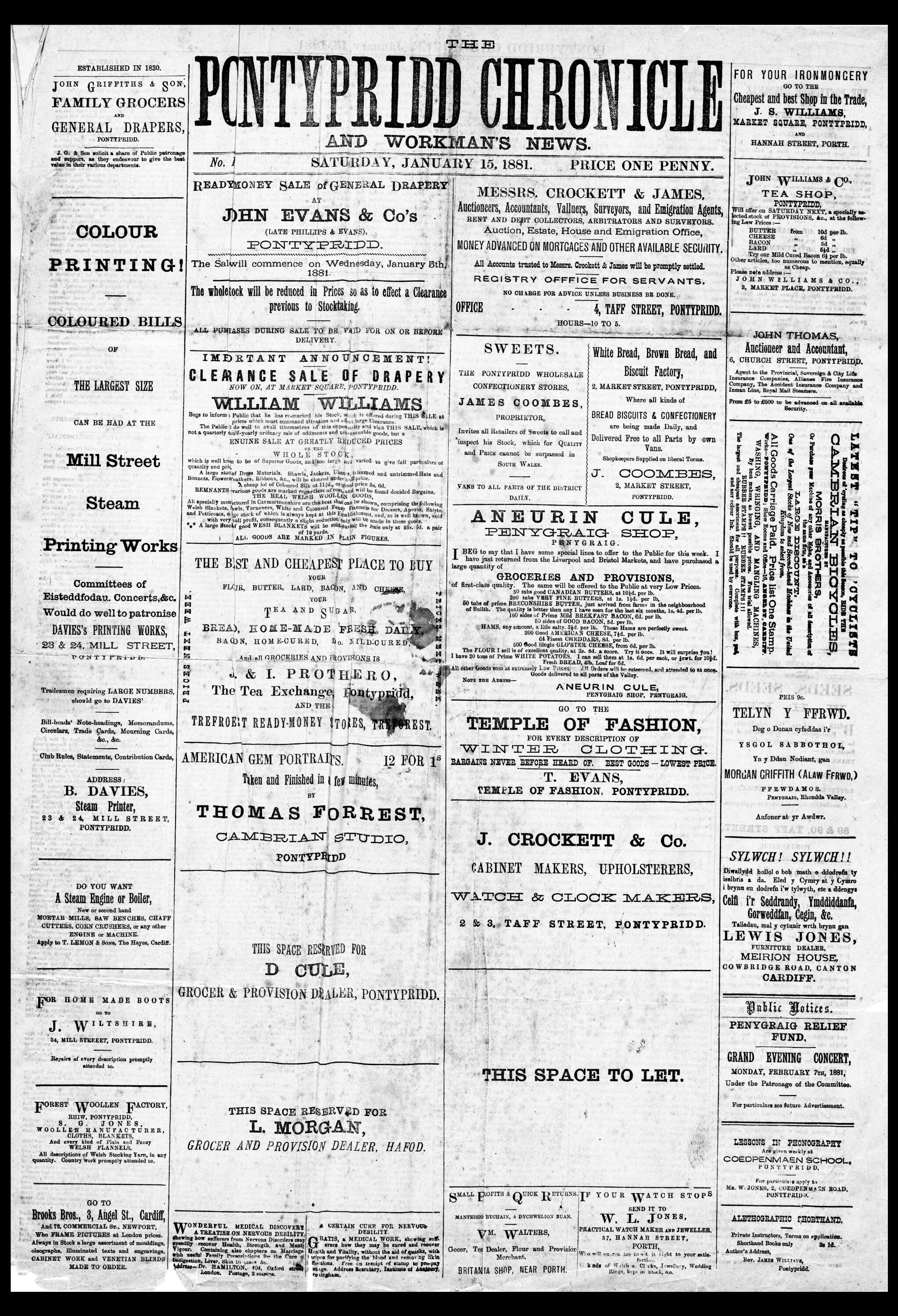
Front page of the earliest surviving copy of the Welsh newspaper The Pontypridd Chronicle, January 1881

This article is about the particular significance of the year 1881 to Wales and its people.

== Incumbents ==
- Archdruid of the National Eisteddfod of Wales – Clwydfardd
- Lord Lieutenant of Anglesey – William Owen Stanley
- Lord Lieutenant of Brecknockshire – Joseph Bailey, 1st Baron Glanusk
- Lord Lieutenant of Caernarvonshire – Edward Douglas-Pennant, 1st Baron Penrhyn
- Lord Lieutenant of Cardiganshire – Edward Pryse
- Lord Lieutenant of Carmarthenshire – John Campbell, 2nd Earl Cawdor
- Lord Lieutenant of Denbighshire – William Cornwallis-West
- Lord Lieutenant of Flintshire – Hugh Robert Hughes
- Lord Lieutenant of Glamorgan – Christopher Rice Mansel Talbot
- Lord Lieutenant of Merionethshire – Edward Lloyd-Mostyn, 2nd Baron Mostyn
- Lord Lieutenant of Monmouthshire – Henry Somerset, 8th Duke of Beaufort
- Lord Lieutenant of Montgomeryshire – Edward Herbert, 3rd Earl of Powis
- Lord Lieutenant of Pembrokeshire – William Edwardes, 4th Baron Kensington
- Lord Lieutenant of Radnorshire – Arthur Walsh, 2nd Baron Ormathwaite
- Bishop of Bangor – James Colquhoun Campbell
- Bishop of Llandaff – Alfred Ollivant
- Bishop of St Asaph – Joshua Hughes
- Bishop of St Davids – Basil Jones

== Events ==
- January – At least five people freeze to death during blizzards and extreme low temperatures throughout Wales.
- 4 March – Physician William Price marries 22-year-old Gwenllian Llywelyn in a Druidic ceremony at Pontypridd on his 81st birthday.
- 27 August – The Sunday Closing (Wales) Act prohibits the sale of alcohol on a Sunday. This is the first Act of Parliament in the United Kingdom since the 1542 Act of Union whose application is restricted to Wales.
- 13 October – 19 people drown when the Cyprian is wrecked off the Lleyn peninsula.
- date unknown
  - Welsh Regiment formed as part of the Childers Reforms of the British Army, incorporating the 41st (Welsh) Regiment of Foot.
  - River Vyrnwy is dammed to create Lake Vyrnwy.

== Arts and literature ==
The Cambrian Academy of Art is formed by English and Welsh artists in North Wales.

== Awards ==
National Eisteddfod of Wales – held at Merthyr Tydfil

- Chair – Evan Rees ("Dyfed"), "Cariad"
- Crown – Watkin Hezekiah Williams

=== New books ===
- Amy Dillwyn – Chloe Arguelle
- Daniel Owen – Y Dreflan

== Sport ==
- Rugby union
  - 19 February – First Wales national game, played at Blackheath against England. Wales lose heavily.
  - 12 March – The Welsh Rugby Union is formed as the Welsh Football Union in a meeting in Neath.

== Births ==
- 1 January – George Latham, footballer (died 1939)
- 3 January – Lewis Pugh Evans, VC recipient (died 1962)
- 14 February – William John Gruffydd, academic and politician (died 1954)
- 9 April – John Hart Evans, Wales international rugby player (died 1959)
- 15 April – David Thomas ("Afan"), composer (died 1928)
- 16 April – Ifor Williams, academic (died 1965)
- 5 May – Rupert Price Hallowes, VC recipient (died 1915)
- 16 June – David Grenfell, politician (died 1968)
- 20 June – John Crichton-Stuart, 4th Marquess of Bute, landowner (died 1947)
- August – John Lewis, footballer (died 1954)
- 30 September – Philip Lewis Griffiths, lawyer (died 1945)
- 1 October – Cliff Pritchard, Wales international rugby player (died 1954)
- 28 October – Edward Evans, 1st Baron Mountevans, explorer (died 1957)
- 10 December – David Phillips Jones, Wales international rugby player (died 1936)
- December – George Hall, politician (died 1965)
- date unknown
  - Robert Williams, trade union leader (died 1936)

== Deaths ==
- 3 January – William H. C. Lloyd, clergyman, 78
- 19 January – John Roose Elias, poet, 60
- 11 March – Thomas Brigstocke, portrait painter, 71
- 20 April – William Burges, architect, 53
- 7 June – William Milbourne James, judge, 74
- 26 July – George Borrow, author of Wild Wales, 78
- 13 October – Edwin Barber Morgan, Welsh-descended president of Wells Fargo, 67
- 20 November – Hugh Owen, educationist, 77
- 22 November – John Owen Griffith (Ioan Arfon), poet and critic, 53
- 10 December – Walter Powell, industrialist and politician, 39

== See also ==
- 1881 in Ireland
