= 1880 in Wales =

- Centuries: 17th; 18th; 19th; 20th; 21st
- Decades: 1860s; 1870s; 1880s; 1890s; 1900s
- See also: List of years in Wales; Timeline of Welsh history 1880 in The United Kingdom Scotland Elsewhere

This article is about the particular significance of the year 1880 to Wales and its people.

== Incumbents ==
- Archdruid of the National Eisteddfod of Wales – Clwydfardd
- Lord Lieutenant of Anglesey – William Owen Stanley
- Lord Lieutenant of Brecknockshire – Joseph Bailey, 1st Baron Glanusk
- Lord Lieutenant of Caernarvonshire – Edward Douglas-Pennant, 1st Baron Penrhyn
- Lord Lieutenant of Cardiganshire – Edward Pryse
- Lord Lieutenant of Carmarthenshire – John Campbell, 2nd Earl Cawdor
- Lord Lieutenant of Denbighshire – William Cornwallis-West
- Lord Lieutenant of Flintshire – Hugh Robert Hughes
- Lord Lieutenant of Glamorgan – Christopher Rice Mansel Talbot
- Lord Lieutenant of Merionethshire – Edward Lloyd-Mostyn, 2nd Baron Mostyn
- Lord Lieutenant of Monmouthshire – Henry Somerset, 8th Duke of Beaufort
- Lord Lieutenant of Montgomeryshire – Edward Herbert, 3rd Earl of Powis
- Lord Lieutenant of Pembrokeshire – William Edwardes, 4th Baron Kensington
- Lord Lieutenant of Radnorshire – Arthur Walsh, 2nd Baron Ormathwaite
- Bishop of Bangor – James Colquhoun Campbell
- Bishop of Llandaff – Alfred Ollivant
- Bishop of St Asaph – Joshua Hughes
- Bishop of St Davids – Basil Jones

== Events ==
- 25 February – The Resurgam, an early mechanically-powered submarine, sinks off Rhyl.
- 10 March – Six miners are killed in an accident at the Bedwellty Colliery, Tredegar.
- 29 April – At the United Kingdom general election, Wales elects 28 Liberal MPs. David Davies, Llandinam, is returned unopposed as member for Cardigan.
- 17 June – The rebuilt Holyhead railway station and inner harbour are officially opened by the Prince of Wales.
- 15 July – 120 miners are killed in an accident at the Risca Colliery.
- 3 August – Nine miners are killed in an accident at the Bersham Colliery in Wrexham.
- 10 December – 101 miners are killed in an accident at the Penygraig Colliery, Rhondda.

== Arts and literature ==
- Beriah Gwynfe Evans – Owain Glyndwr, one of the first full-length plays in the Welsh language, is first performed at Llanberis.

== Awards ==
National Eisteddfod of Wales held at Caernarfon (first "official" National Eisteddfod)

- Chair – W. B. Joseph, "Athrilyth"
- Crown – Ellis Roberts (Elis Wyn o Wyrfai)

=== New books ===
- Sir William Boyd Dawkins – Early Man in Britain and his place in the Tertiary Period
- Amy Dillwyn – The Rebecca Rioter

=== Music ===
- Joseph Parry – Emmanuel (cantata)

== Sport ==
- Football – The Druids of Rhiwabon win the Welsh Cup for the first time.
- Rugby union – Cwmbran RFC and Crumlin RFC are founded.
- Yachting – Penarth Yacht Club is founded as Penarth Boat Club.

== Births ==
- 31 January – Phil Hopkins, Wales international rugby player (died 1966)
- 12 February – William Joseph Rhys, writer (died 1967)
- 17 March – Harry Grindell Matthews, inventor (died 1941)
- 8 April – Thomas Thomas, boxing champion (died 1911)
- 19 April – Jack Jenkins, Wales international rugby player (died 1971)
- 30 April – George Maitland Lloyd Davies, pacifist (died 1949)
- 9 May – Thomas Scott-Ellis, 8th Baron Howard de Walden, patron of the arts (died 1946)
- 11 May – David Davies, 1st Baron Davies, politician (died 1944)
- 22 May
  - Dr Teddy Morgan, Wales international rugby player (died 1947)
  - Robert John Rowlands ('Meuryn'), journalist and poet (died 1967)
- 31 May – Edward Tegla Davies, author (died 1967)
- 22 June – Rhys Gabe, rugby player (died 1967)
- 27 July – Percy Baker, gymnast (died 1957)
- 2 September – Isaac Daniel Hooson, poet (died 1948)
- 15 September – William Charles Williams, VC recipient (died 1915)
- 20 September – Ernie Jenkins, Wales international rugby player (died 1958)

== Deaths ==
- 6 January – John Thomas ('Minimus'), minister and author, 71
- 12 February – John Whitehead Greaves, slate mine proprietor, 72
- 2 March – Charles Meredith, Tasmanian politician, 68
- 12 April – Thomas Joseph Brown, Roman Catholic bishop, 81
- 23 April – Robert Thomas ('Ap Vychan'), minister and writer, 70
- 10 May – David Charles II, hymn-writer, 76?
- 21 August – Evan Mathew Richards, politician, 68
- 30 August – Mordecai Jones, industrialist, 67
- 9 September – William Watkin Edward Wynne, politician and antiquarian, 78

== See also ==
- 1880 in Ireland
