= 1874 in Wales =

- Centuries: 17th; 18th; 19th; 20th; 21st
- Decades: 1850s; 1860s; 1870s; 1880s; 1890s
- See also: List of years in Wales; Timeline of Welsh history 1874 in The United Kingdom Scotland Elsewhere

This article is about the particular significance of the year 1874 to Wales and its people.

== Incumbents ==
- Lord Lieutenant of Anglesey – William Owen Stanley
- Lord Lieutenant of Brecknockshire – Charles Morgan, 1st Baron Tredegar
- Lord Lieutenant of Caernarvonshire – Edward Douglas-Pennant, 1st Baron Penrhyn
- Lord Lieutenant of Cardiganshire – Edward Pryse
- Lord Lieutenant of Carmarthenshire – John Campbell, 2nd Earl Cawdor
- Lord Lieutenant of Denbighshire – William Cornwallis-West
- Lord Lieutenant of Flintshire – Sir Stephen Glynne, 9th Baronet (until 17 June) Hugh Robert Hughes (from 4 August)
- Lord Lieutenant of Glamorgan – Christopher Rice Mansel Talbot
- Lord Lieutenant of Merionethshire – Edward Lloyd-Mostyn, 2nd Baron Mostyn
- Lord Lieutenant of Monmouthshire – Henry Somerset, 8th Duke of Beaufort
- Lord Lieutenant of Montgomeryshire – Sudeley Hanbury-Tracy, 3rd Baron Sudeley
- Lord Lieutenant of Pembrokeshire – William Edwardes, 4th Baron Kensington
- Lord Lieutenant of Radnorshire – John Walsh, 1st Baron Ormathwaite
- Bishop of Bangor – James Colquhoun Campbell
- Bishop of Llandaff – Alfred Ollivant
- Bishop of St Asaph – Joshua Hughes
- Bishop of St Davids – Connop Thirlwall (until May); Basil Jones (from 24 August)

== Events ==
- 24 January – Four pilots and two apprentices are drowned in an accident off Llanddwyn on Anglesey.
- 17 February – In the 1874 United Kingdom general election, newly elected MPs include David Davies (Llandinam) at Cardigan (returned unopposed).
- 1 April – Frances Morgan marries Dr George Hoggan. They later open the first husband-and-wife general medical practice in the UK.
- 1 May – Coal-owner Sir George Elliot is raised to the baronetcy by the new prime minister, Disraeli.
- 15 July – Laying of the foundation stone of the clock tower at Machynlleth, built to mark the coming of age in 1873 of Viscount Castlereagh, the eldest son of the 5th Marquess of Londonderry of Plas Machynlleth.
- 20 July – In a mining accident at Charles Colliery, Llansamlet, nineteen men are killed.
- October – The Western Mail reports a deathbed confession made to a minister in the US by a man who claimed he carried out the assault for which Dic Penderyn was executed in 1831.
- 24 August – William Basil Jones is consecrated Bishop of St David's.
- 5 October – The Powysland Club holds its annual meeting at the new Powysland Museum in Welshpool.
- 16 October – The first issue of Yr Ymwelydd is published in Australia under the editorship of William Meirion Evans.
- unknown dates
  - Strike at Dinorwig slate quarry.
  - The Welsh Flannel Company is established at Holywell.
  - Henry Davis Pochin begins laying out Bodnant Garden.
  - John Mathias Berry and his wife Mary move to Merthyr Tydfil. The three sons born to them here go on to achieve success in business and be raised to the peerage: Henry Seymour Berry, 1st Baron Buckland, William Ewart Berry, 1st Viscount Camrose and Gomer Berry, 1st Viscount Kemsley.
  - Rev. Richard Williams Morgan is consecrated First Patriarch of a restored Ancient British Church by Jules Ferrette, the founder of the British Orthodox Church, taking the religious name of 'Mar Pelagius I' and undertaking to revive Celtic Christianity as practised prior to the Synod of Whitby while continuing duties as an Anglican clergyman.

== Arts and literature ==
- William Goscombe John begins assisting his father, a wood-carver, in his work at Cardiff Castle.

=== Awards ===
- Evan Jones (Gurnos) wins the bardic chair at the Bangor eisteddfod.
- William Thomas (Islwyn) wins a bardic chair at Rhyl.

=== New books ===
- Sir William Boyd Dawkins – Cave Hunting
- Gwaith Thomas Edwards (ed. Isaac Foulkes)
- Isaac Foulkes – Rheinallt ab Gruffydd

=== Music ===
- Joseph Parry becomes head of the new music department at University of Wales, Aberystwyth.
- The London Welsh Choral Union presents Sarah Edith Wynne with a bust of herself by Joseph Edwards.

== Sport ==
- Rugby union
  - The first match is played at Cardiff Arms Park, between the Wanderers Club and Glamorgan 2nd XV.
  - Newport RFC and Swansea RFC are founded.

== Births ==
- 4 February – Thomas Fagan Wallace, agricultural scientist (died 1951)
- 6 February – David Evans, composer (died 1948)
- 6 May – Miriam Kate Williams ("Vulcana"), strongwoman (died 1946)
- 20 May (in India) – Sir George Lewis Barstow, civil servant (died 1966)
- 2 July – George Boots, international rugby player (died 1928)
- 15 July – Gwyn Nicholls, Wales rugby captain (died 1939)
- 16 July – William Alexander, Wales international rugby player (died 1937)
- 20 July – David Bowen (Myfyr Hefin), minister and author (died 1955)
- 30 July – Billy Meredith, footballer (died 1958)
- 31 October – James Henry Thomas, politician (died 1949)
- 12 November – Rachel Barrett, editor and suffragette (died 1953)
- 1 December – Dick Hellings, Wales international rugby player (died 1938)
- 30 December – Nantlais Williams, poet and religious leader (died 1959)
- date unknown
  - William Eames, journalist (died 1958)
  - (in USA) Thomas David Edwards, composer (died 1930), musician

== Deaths ==
- 3 January – Morris Williams (Nicander), author, 64
- 19 January – John Parry, editor, 61
- 19 April – Owen Jones, architect, 65
- 8 May (in Launceston, Tasmania) – Zephaniah Williams, Chartist leader, 78
- 17 June – Sir Stephen Glynne, 9th Baronet, 66
- 10 August – David Davies (Dai'r Cantwr), Rebecca rioter (born about 1812)
- 19 August – Joseph Kenny Meadows, illustrator, 83
- 3 October – Owen Williams (Owen Gwyrfai), poet, 84
- 14 November – John Ambrose Lloyd, musician, 59
- 19 November – Mary Pendrill Llewelyn, writer and translator, 63

== See also ==
- 1874 in Ireland
