= 1872 in Wales =

- Centuries: 17th; 18th; 19th; 20th; 21st
- Decades: 1850s; 1860s; 1870s; 1880s; 1890s
- See also: List of years in Wales; Timeline of Welsh history 1872 in The United Kingdom Scotland Elsewhere

View of a street in Barmouth in 1872

This article is about the particular significance of the year 1872 to Wales and its people.

== Incumbents ==
- Lord Lieutenant of Anglesey – William Owen Stanley
- Lord Lieutenant of Brecknockshire – Charles Morgan, 1st Baron Tredegar
- Lord Lieutenant of Caernarvonshire – Edward Douglas-Pennant, 1st Baron Penrhyn
- Lord Lieutenant of Cardiganshire – Edward Pryse
- Lord Lieutenant of Carmarthenshire – John Campbell, 2nd Earl Cawdor
- Lord Lieutenant of Denbighshire – Robert Myddelton Biddulph (until 21 March); William Cornwallis-West (from 5 June)
- Lord Lieutenant of Flintshire – Sir Stephen Glynne, 9th Baronet
- Lord Lieutenant of Glamorgan – Christopher Rice Mansel Talbot
- Lord Lieutenant of Merionethshire – Edward Lloyd-Mostyn, 2nd Baron Mostyn
- Lord Lieutenant of Monmouthshire – Henry Somerset, 8th Duke of Beaufort
- Lord Lieutenant of Montgomeryshire – Sudeley Hanbury-Tracy, 3rd Baron Sudeley
- Lord Lieutenant of Pembrokeshire – William Edwardes, 3rd Baron Kensington (until 1 January); William Edwardes, 4th Baron Kensington (from 6 February)
- Lord Lieutenant of Radnorshire – John Walsh, 1st Baron Ormathwaite
- Bishop of Bangor – James Colquhoun Campbell
- Bishop of Llandaff – Alfred Ollivant
- Bishop of St Asaph – Joshua Hughes
- Bishop of St Davids – Connop Thirlwall

== Events ==
- 5 January — In a mining accident at Blackwood Colliery, five men are killed.
- 2 March — In a mining accident at Victoria Colliery, Ebbw Vale, nineteen men are killed.
- 18 June — A derailment occurs in the Pencader Tunnel on the Carmarthen & Cardigan Railway.
- 12 July — Cardiff Tramways Company begins operation of horse trams.
- 15 July — The Colwyn Bay Hotel is opened.
- 1 August — Minffordd railway station is opened.
- 9 October — University College Wales, Aberystwyth, opens with 26 students; Thomas Charles Edwards is its first principal.
- unknown dates
  - Stocks are used on the last recorded occasion in the UK, at Adpar in Cardiganshire, when a man is imprisoned in them for drunkenness.
  - Nitrocellulose manufacture at Penrhyndeudraeth begins.

== Arts and literature ==
=== New books ===
- R. D. Blackmore — The Maid of Sker
- Thomas Thomas — Hynodion Hen Bregethwyr Cymru

=== Music ===
- The South Wales "Cor Mawr", conducted by Griffith R. Jones (Caradog) wins a national choral competition at Crystal Palace.

== Sport ==
- Cricket — First game played at Elwy Grove Park, St Asaph.
- Football — 28 September: Wrexham Football Club is founded. They play at the Racecourse Ground.

== Births ==
- 21 February — Evan Lorimer Thomas, clergyman and academic (died 1953)
- 16 March — Vernon Hartshorn, politician (died 1931)
- 6 May — William Llewellyn Thomas, Wales international rugby player (died 1943)
- 10 May — Tom Pearson, Wales international rugby player (died 1957)
- 18 May — Bertrand Russell, philosopher (died 1970)
- 14 July — David Morgan, Wales international rugby player (died 1933)
- 14 September — Albert Jenkin, Wales international rugby player (died 1961)
- 8 October — John Cowper Powys, Anglo-Welsh writer (died 1963)
- date unknown — Thomas Jeremiah Williams, lawyer and politician (died 1919)

== Deaths ==
- 1 January — William Edwardes, 3rd Baron Kensington, Lord Lieutenant of Pembrokeshire, 70
- 9 January — Crawshay Bailey, industrialist
- 21 March — Robert Myddelton Biddulph, landowner and politician, 66
- 24 March — James Williams, clergyman and philanthropist, 81
- 13 April — Thomas Vowler Short, Bishop of St Asaph
- 3 August — William Davies Evans, chess player, 82
- 18 August — Evan Jones, missionary, 84
- 22 August — Evan Davies, educator, 84
- 26 September — William Williams (Carw Coch), poet
- 28 September — Lleyson Hopkin Davy, government representative, brewer and industrialist, 89/90
- 16 October — David Lewis, MP for Carmarthen, 75
- 11 November — Mary Anne Disraeli, wife of British prime minister Benjamin Disraeli, 80

== See also ==
- 1872 in Ireland
