= 1877 in Ireland =

- Centuries: 17th; 18th; 19th; 20th; 21st
- Decades: 1850s; 1860s; 1870s; 1880s; 1890s
- See also: 1877 in the United Kingdom; Other events of 1877; List of years in Ireland

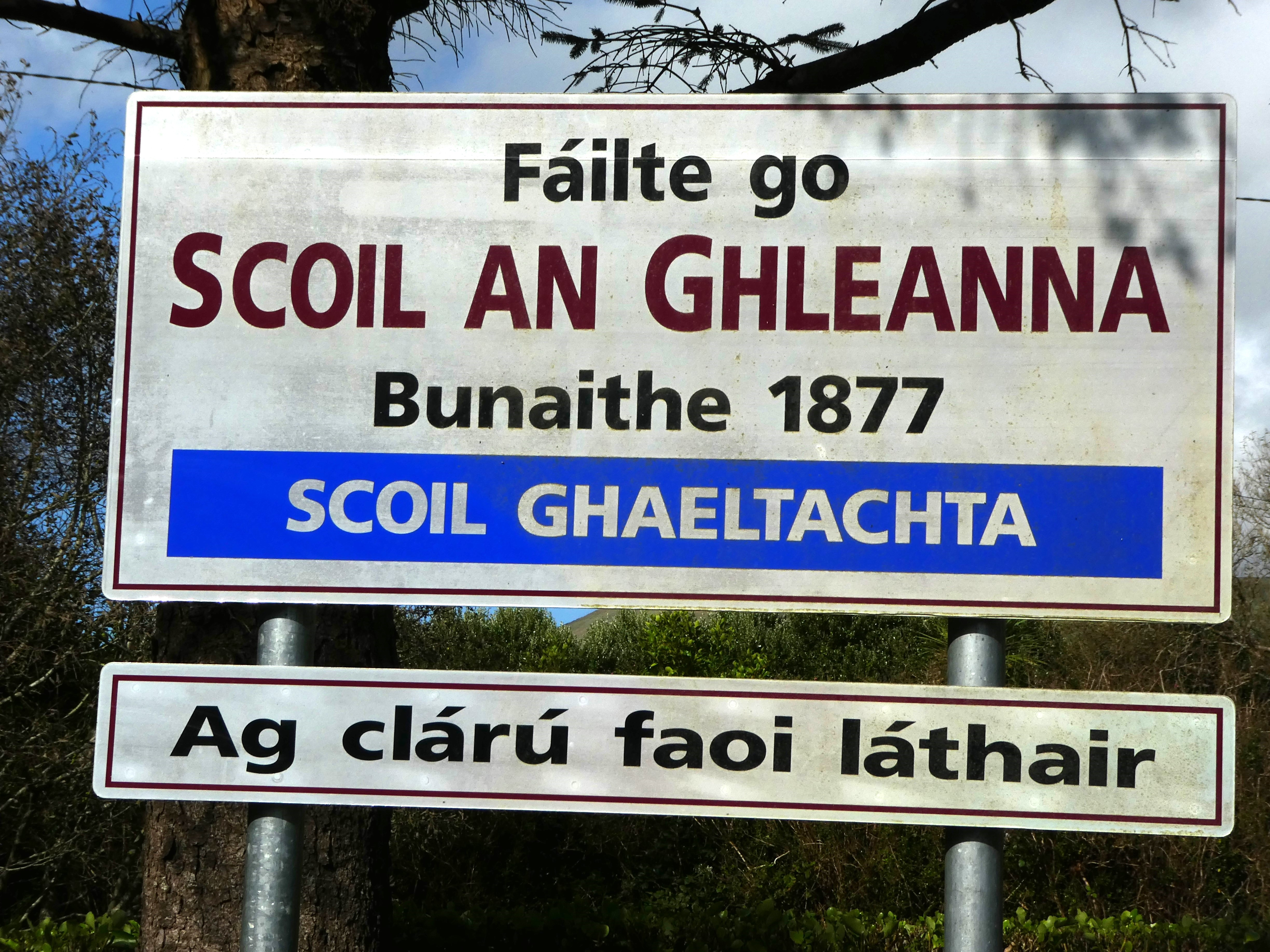
Unilingual Irish-language school name sign, est. 1877

Events from the year 1877 in Ireland.

== Events ==
- May – Sophia Jex-Blake qualifies as a Licentiate of the King’s and Queen’s College of Physicians of Ireland (LKQCPI).
- 7/9 July – Pedro II, Emperor of Brazil, arrives in Belfast on the SS Antrim as part of a largely unpublicised visit to Ireland. As part of the trip, he visits the Giant's Causeway, Dublin, the lakes of Killarney, and Cork. The emperor and his entourage depart Ireland on 11 July.
- 1 September – the narrow gauge Ballymena and Larne Railway starts operations in County Antrim, from Larne to Ballyclare for goods traffic.
- 14 August – National Museum of Ireland established in Dublin.

== Arts and literature ==
- Percy French, at this time a student at Trinity College Dublin, composes the song "Abdul Abulbul Amir".

== Births ==
- 20 February – T. C. Hammond, Anglican clergyman, Principal of Moore Theological College, Sydney (died 1961).
- 12 March – Sam Maguire, Irish Republican and Gaelic footballer (died 1927).
- 17 March – George Gardiner, boxer (died 1954).
- 2 April – Gus Kelly, cricketer (died 1951).
- 2 April – Richard Rowley, poet and writer (died 1947).
- 26 April – Robert Gwynn, cricketer (died 1962).
- 26 May – Hanna Sheehy-Skeffington, feminist, suffragette and writer (died 1946).
- 12 June – Hugh Godley, 2nd Baron Kilbracken, barrister (died 1950).
- 20 July – Tom Crean, Antarctic explorer and publican (died 1938).
- 2 December – Cahir Healy, Nationalist Party MP (died 1970).
- 15 December – John T. McNicholas, Archbishop of Roman Catholic Archdiocese of Cincinnati and founder of the Catholic Legion of Decency (died 1950).
  Full date unknown
  - George C. Bennett, Cumann na nGaedheal TD, later Fine Gael and Seanad Éireann member (died 1963).
  - Con Lehane, socialist active in the Irish Socialist Republican Party, the Social Democratic Federation and Socialist Party of Great Britain (died 1919).

== Deaths ==
- 7 February – John O'Mahony, a founder of the Irish Republican Brotherhood (born 1816).
- 11 June - Samuel Kelly, coal merchant (born 1818)
- 1 October – David Moriarty, Roman Catholic Bishop of Kerry (born 1814).

== See also ==
- 1877 in Scotland
- 1877 in Wales
