= Benjamin Davies (Hebraist) =

Welsh hebraist (1814-1875)

Benjamin Davies (1814 – 19 July 1875) was a 19th-century Welsh Hebraist. He was son of Silvanus Davies, a Carmarthenshire farmer. Having begun preaching at the age of 15, in 1830 he entered Bristol Baptist College. He subsequently studied in Dublin, Glasgow, and in Leipzig where he obtained a Ph.D. degree, and developed friendships with a number of eminent German Hebraists. On his return in 1838, he was ordained in London, before taking up the post of Principle of Montreal Training College for North American Missionaries (1838–44). In 1844 he was appointed President and Theological Tutor of Stepney Baptist College, London, where he stayed until becoming Professor of Semitics at McGill College, Montreal in 1847. He returned to London in 1857, where he worked at the then Regent's Park Baptist College.

His writings include, 'Student's Hebrew Grammar' and 'Student's Lexicon of the Hebrew Language', based on the German works of Roediger and Gesenius respectively, and an annotated edition of E. Robinson's 'Harmony of the Gospels'.

He died at his son's house in Frome in July 1875.

== Co-works ==
- Harmony of the Four Gospels in the words of the Authorized Version, Following the Harmony of the Gospels in Greek
