= David Brazell =

Welsh singer

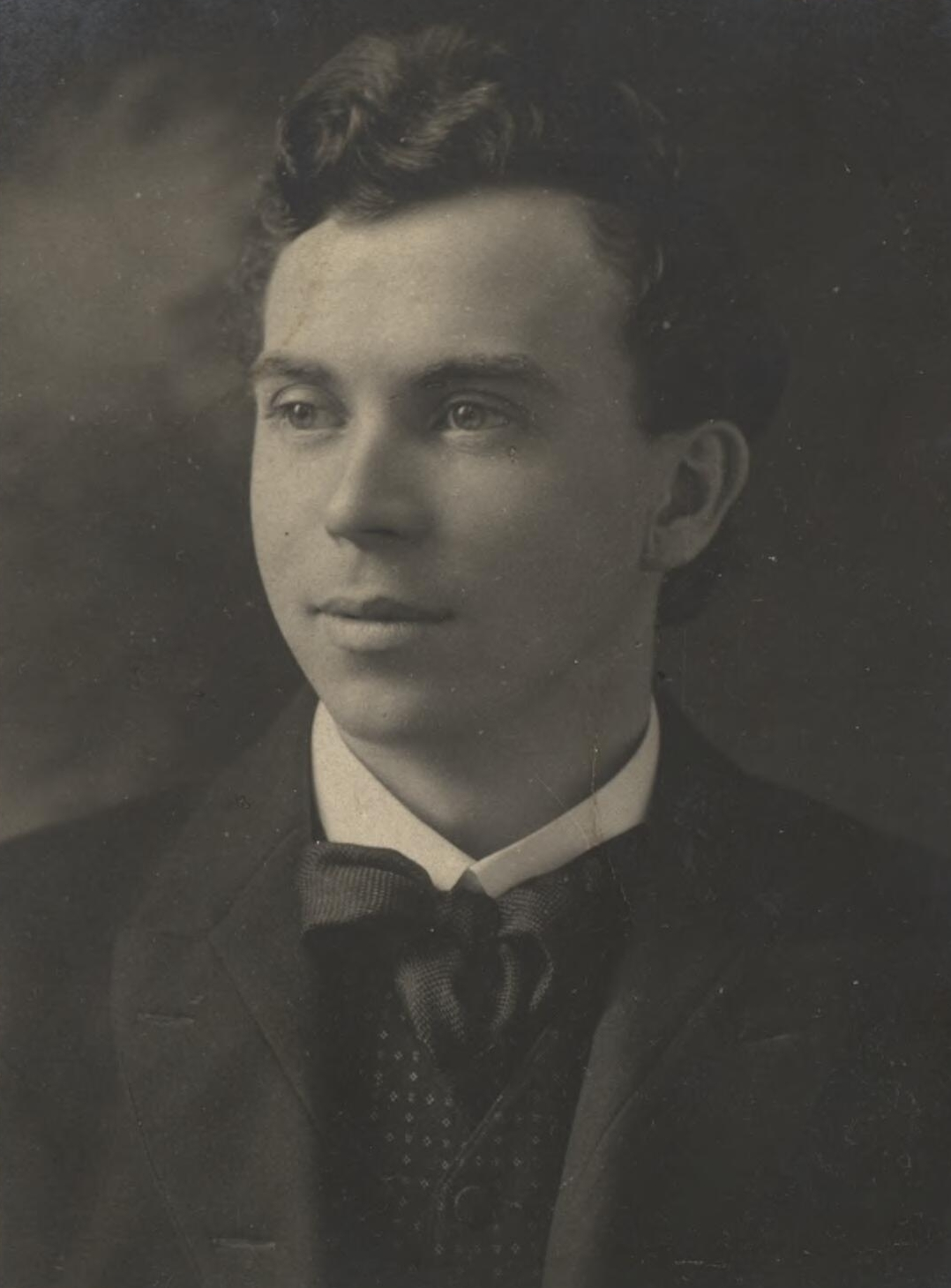
David Brazell circa 1905

David Brazell (1875 – 1959) was a Welsh singer. His parents were collier John Brazell, and Mary, of Pwll, Llanelli, Carmarthenshire. Following his education at local schools, Brazell entered employment in the tinplate industry, but studied music in Llanelli during his spare time. In 1901, encouraged by his teacher, R.C. Jenkins, he joined the Royal Academy of Music in London, where he spent five years. In 1906 he was offered contracts with several professional opera companies, first joining the Carl Rosa Opera Company before choosing to continue his career on a freelance basis.

He had a rich baritone voice, which was favoured by a number of accomplished composers of his time. Edward Elgar invited him to sing at an early performance of his oratorio, The Dream of Gerontius, and Edward German invited him to sing the part of the Earl of Essex in his opera, Merrie England.

He made numerous recordings, of selections from operas and oratorios, popular songs, and Welsh songs, and his name appeared in the catalogues of a number of gramophone companies. He died in hospital in Llanelli in 1959.
