= John Davies of Nercwys =

Welsh Calvinistic Methodist minister

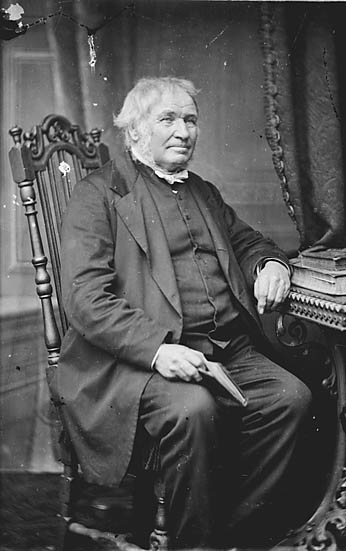
John Davies of Nercwys

John Davies (John Davies of Nercwys; 26 May 1799 – 5 March 1879) was a Welsh Calvinistic Methodist minister, preacher and writer.

He was born at Llanerch, in the parish of Llanarmon-yn-Iâl. His parents were Joseph and Eleanor Davies; a photograph of Eleanor (née Parry) is held by the National Library of Wales. He was baptised in the parish church on 31 May 1799, but the family moved to Rhos Ithel, Nercwys, in about 1800, and later to Mold; he grew up in the Mold area. At the age of 16, in 1815, he is known to have become a member of Mold Methodist Society. A few years later he began preaching, and in 1834 he was ordained. Though he was an itinerant preacher, his home remained in the Nercwys area of Flintshire; hence the place name was used as an additional epithet to differentiate him from others named John Davies.

His writings include a commentary on the Book of Proverbs (1869). In 1875, he received a testimonial from the chapel where he officiated, "in acknowledgement of his personal worth and abilities". At the age of 76, he had been preaching for 53 years and was the oldest-but-one minister still officiating in North Wales. It was calculated that he had preached 18,779 times in the course of his career. The total sum collected was £100.

Davies died in March 1879. His portrait hangs in Flintshire Record Office together with that of the novelist Daniel Owen, who was christened by him.
