= Edward Edwards (zoologist) =

Welsh marine zoologist (1803–1879)

Edward Edwards (23 November 1803 – 13 August 1879) was a Welsh marine zoologist.

Edwards was born on 23 November 1803, at Corwen, Merionethshire, where he received his education. He started in life as a draper at Bangor, Carnarvonshire, which business he carried on until 1839, when he retired from it. In the following year he established a foundry and ironworks at Menai Bridge, which he appears to have carried on for several years with much success.

In 1864, being interested in observing the forms of marine life in the waters of the Menai Strait he began to study the habits and characters of the fish in their native element. He was induced to attempt an artificial arrangement for preserving the fish in health in confinement, so as to be enabled to study their habits more closely. By an imitation of the natural conditions under which the fishes flourished, he succeeded in introducing such improvements in the construction of aquaria as enabled him to preserve the fish for an almost unlimited period without change of water.

His most notable improvement was his 'dark-water chamber slope-back tank,' the result of a close study of the rock pools, with their fissures and chasms, in the rocks on the shores of the Menai Strait. This improvement retarded for a long time the falling off in the taste for domestic aquaria, and the principle of Edwards's tank was most successfully adopted in all the large establishments of this country, and in many of the continental and American zoological schools.

To the pursuit of this interesting branch of natural history Edwards devoted the last years of his life, dying, at the age of seventy-five, on 13 August 1879, after an attack of paralysis.
