= Trevor Preece =

Welsh cricketer

Personal information
- Full name: Trevor Preece
- Born: 13 October 1882; Cowbridge, Glamorgan, Wales
- Died: 21 September 1965 (aged 82); Cardiff, Glamorgan, Wales
- Batting: Right-handed
- Bowling: Right-arm off break

Domestic team information
- Years: Team
- 1902–1923: Glamorgan

Career statistics
Competition	First-class
Matches	1
Runs scored	8
Batting average	4.00
100s/50s	–/–
Top score	4
Balls bowled	–
Wickets	–
Bowling average	–
5 wickets in innings	–
10 wickets in match	–
Best bowling	–
Catches/stumpings	1/–
- Source: Cricinfo, 12 June 2012

Trevor Preece (13 October 1882 – 21 September 1965) was a Welsh cricketer. He was a right-handed batsman and right-arm off-break bowler who played for Glamorgan. He was born in Cowbridge and died in Whitchurch, Cardiff.

Preece, who played cricket and hockey for Cardiff, Barry, and St. Fagan's, made his Minor Counties Cricket debut for Glamorgan during the 1902 season, though it would be a further 21 years before he made his only first-class appearance, during the 1923 season, against Lancashire. He scored 4 runs in each innings in which he batted.

Preece's son, Hugh, played Minor Counties Cricket for Glamorgan Second XI.
