= George Barstow (civil servant) =

British civil servant and businessman (1874-1966)

Sir George Barstow KCB
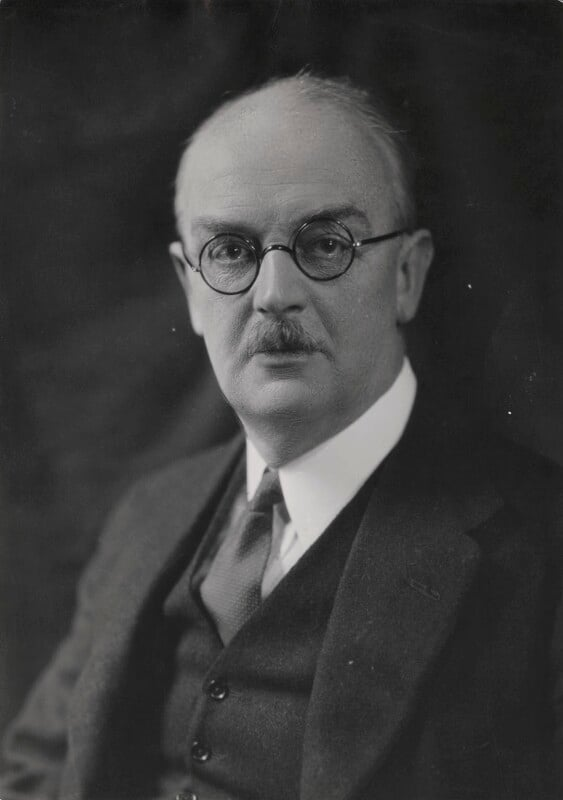
- Barstow in 1942

Chairman, Prudential Assurance Company
- In office 1941–1953

Government Director, Anglo-Iranian Oil Company
- In office 1935–1946

Government Director, Anglo-Persian Oil Company
- In office 1927–1935

Controller of Supply Services, HM Treasury
- In office 1919–1927

Personal details
- Born: George Lewis Barstow; 20 May 1874 York, England
- Died: 29 January 1966 (aged 91)
- Education: Clifton College
- Occupation: Civil servant and businessman

Sir George Lewis Barstow KCB (20 May 1874 – 29 January 1966) was a British civil servant and businessman.

Barstow was born in York and was educated at Clifton College and Emmanuel College, Cambridge. He then entered the Civil Service. In 1909, he was appointed a principal clerk in HM Treasury and shortly afterwards became an assistant secretary. He was appointed Companion of the Order of the Bath (CB) in the 1913 New Year Honours.

In 1918, he remarked that the planned provision of starting capital by the Ministry of Munitions for the development of electricity generating plants in the Midlands amounted to a form of state capitalism whereby businessmen who had gained a footing in the Ministry of Munitions intended to modernise the British economy at the risk of the taxpayer.

In 1919, he was appointed Controller of Supply Services at the Treasury, serving in the post until 1927. He was appointed Knight Commander of the Order of the Bath (KCB) in the 1920 New Year Honours.

In 1927, he became government director of the Anglo-Persian Oil Company (later the Anglo-Iranian Oil Company), holding the post until 1946. He also joined the board of the Prudential Assurance Company, becoming deputy chairman and then being elected chairman in 1941. He was chairman until 1953.
