= Charles Williams (academic) =

British academic

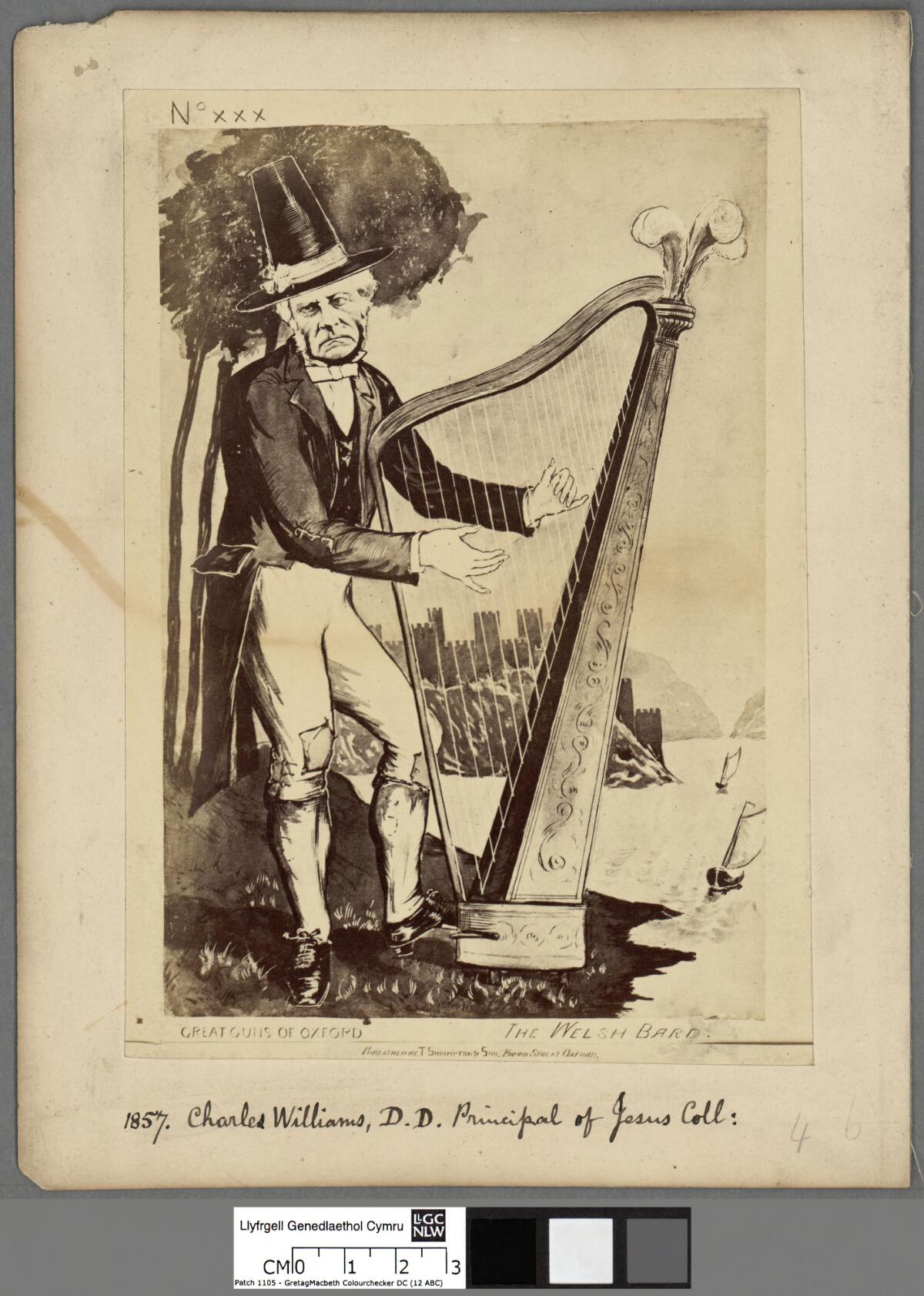
Charles Williams as "The Welsh Bard" (portrait from the Welsh Portrait Collection at the National Library of Wales)

Charles Williams (1807 – 17 October 1877) was Principal of Jesus College, Oxford, from 1857 to 1877.

== Life ==
Williams studied at Jesus College from 1823 to 1827, holding a scholarship and gaining a First in Literae Humaniores. He was then ordained, and was a missionary Fellow of the college from 1829 to 1845. He was headmaster of Ruthin School for a time, before becoming the incumbent of the church at Holyhead in 1845. He was made an honorary canon of Bangor Cathedral in 1856 before being appointed as Principal of Jesus College, Oxford in 1857. He died in the Principal's Lodgings in the college in 1877, aged 70.
