= John Elias Davies =

John Elias Davies (20 March 1847 – 25 January 1883) was a Welsh harpist. He learnt the harp from a young age, tutored for a time by James Hughes (Iago Bencerdd) of Trefriw. He was later tutored by T. D. Morris of Bangor, and William Streatham of Liverpool. In 1858, at the age of 12 he won a prize for his performance at Llangollen Eisteddfod. He later won principal prizes at the Denbigh Eisteddfod (1860) Conwy Eisteddfod (1861), Caernarfon Eisteddfod (1862), Rhyl Eisteddfod (1863), Llandudno Eisteddfod (1864), and Flint Eisteddfod (1867). He is thought to have been one of the most accomplished accompanists of his day.
