= David Stephen Davies =

Welsh writer and preacher

David Stephen Davies (14 February 1841 – 29 October 1898) was a Welsh writer, preacher, and emigrant. He was born in the Plas-Marl area of Swansea. His father was minister John Davies (1803 - 1854), of Mynydd-bach, Llangyfelach. Following the death of his father in 1854, he ended his schooling, and moved to Aberdare to work as an engine-driver. During a strike in 1857 he decided to emigrate to the United States, where he began preaching in Hollidaysburg, Pennsylvania. He attended theological training courses at Wyoming Seminary, Kingston, and the Western Theological Seminary, Allegheny. In 1862 he was ordained minister of Emmet and Ixonia.

By 1872 he was living in New York, where he formed a company promoting emigration, which purchased the ship 'Rush' on which twenty-nine emigrants were sent off to Patagonia. They made it no further than Montevideo, where they dispersed. A number of further failed voyages followed, although a few are known to have managed to reach Patagonia, despite shipwreck, though penniless including D. S. Davies himself. He returned from the colony to Wales just four months later, being invited in 1875 to become minister of Ebenezer, Bangor.

In 1886, he transferred to Union Street church, Carmarthen, remaining there until his death, in 1898.

His writings include Ystyr Bedydd (The Meaning of Baptism) (1891), and Adroddiad (1875), which provided information about Patagonia. He also edited Y Celt.
