= Denbigh, Ruthin and Vale of Clwyd Free Press =

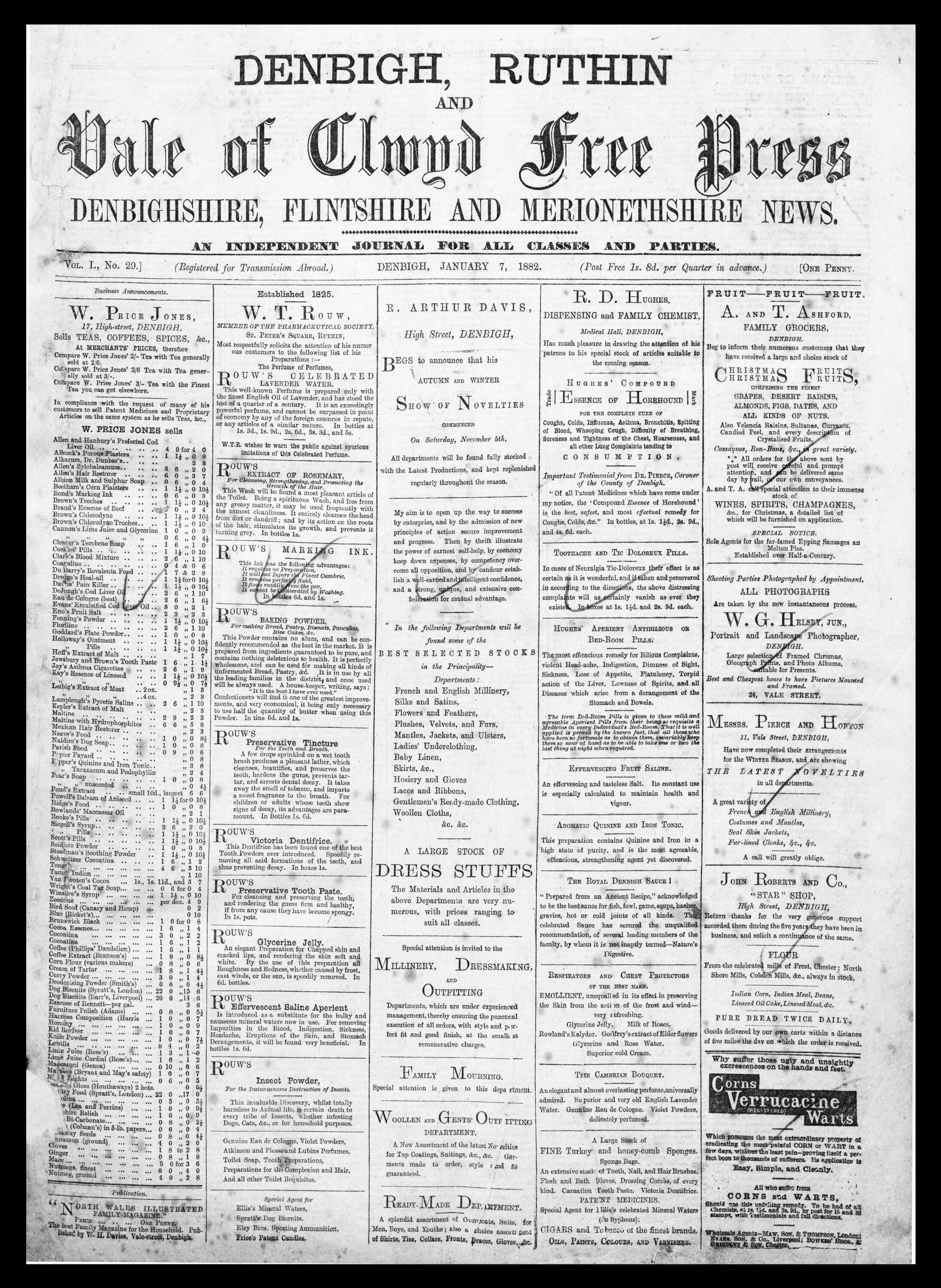
- Denbighshire Free Press, Denbigh, Ruthin, Vale of Clwyd free press
- Type: weekly newspaper
- Publisher: Charles Cottom & Co.
- Launched: May 1881
- City: Denbigh
- Country: Wales
- OCLC number: 751645768

The Denbigh, Ruthin and Vale of Clwyd Free Press was a weekly English language newspaper distributed in the Denbigh, Ruthin, Vale of Clwyd, and Flint areas of Wales.

It mainly contained local and national news and information. An associated title was the Denbighshire Free Press and North Wales Times.

Welsh Newspapers Online has digitised 1,574 issues of the Denbigh, Ruthin and Vale of Clwyd Free Press (1882–1919) from the newspaper holdings of the National Library of Wales.
