= David Davies (composer) =

Welsh composer (1810–1875)

David Davies (1810 – 1875) was a Welsh (Montgomeryshire) composer. He was tenant of a small farm where he is said to have composed the well-known hymn-tune "Glan'rafon" (first published in Llyfr Emynau a Thonau 1868), in a cowshed in a small meadow beside the River Rhiw.
