= Robert Williams (Trebor Mai) =

Welsh poet (1830–1877)

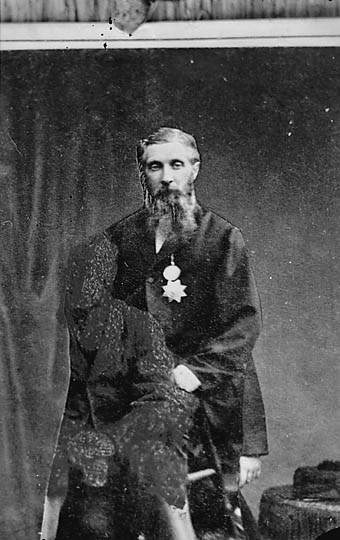
Trebor Mai

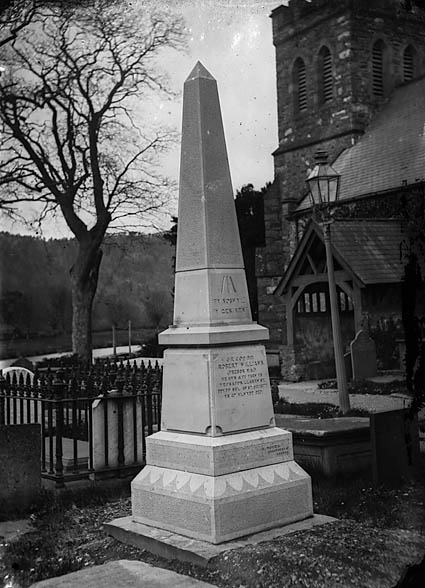
Memorial to Robert Williams (aka Trebor Mai), Llanrwst, c. 1875

Robert Williams (25 May 1830 - 5 August 1877), usually referred to by his bardic name Trebor Mai, was a Welsh language poet, born at Ty'n-yr-ardd near Llanrhychwyn, near Llanrwst, in the old county of Caernarfonshire, the son of a tailor. He was educated at a local Llanrhychwyn school and for a period attended the free school at Llanrwst. Around 1843, he moved with his family to Llanrwst and he applied himself to his father's craft. After he married on 13 October 1854 he commenced business as a tailor himself in Llanrwst, and remained there for the rest of his life. He died in 1877, aged 47.

Trebor Mai is chiefly remembered today for his englynion. He published two small volumes in his lifetime, Fy Noswyl (1861) and Y Geninen (1869). The contents of these with large additions were published posthumously as Gwaith Barddonol Trebor Mai (Isaac Ffoulkes, Liverpool, 1883).

== Works ==
- Williams, Robert, called Trebor Mai, 1830-1877: Fy nosuryl, sef Caneuon. (Llanrwst, argraffwyd gan J. Jones, 1861) (page images at HathiTrust)
- Williams, Robert, called Trebor Mai, 1830-1877: Y Geninen: gan Trebor Mai. (Llanrwst, Argraphwyd gan W.J. Roberts, 1869) (page images at HathiTrust)
