= Aberystwyth (hymn tune) =

Hymn tune composed by Joseph Parry

"Aberystwyth" is a hymn tune composed by Joseph Parry, written in 1876 and first published in 1879 in Edward Stephen's Ail Lyfr Tonau ac Emynau (Welsh for Second Book of Tunes and Hymns). Parry was at the time the first professor and head of the new department of music at the recently founded University College Wales, Aberystwyth, now called Aberystwyth University.

== History ==
The tune "Aberystwyth" has been the most popular setting for Charles Wesley's hymn "Jesus, Lover of My Soul".

== Legacy ==
Some claim that the melody of the African hymn Nkosi Sikelel' iAfrika, which today forms part of the national anthem of South Africa, is derived from this hymn, while others have called the connection far fetched.

== Gallery ==
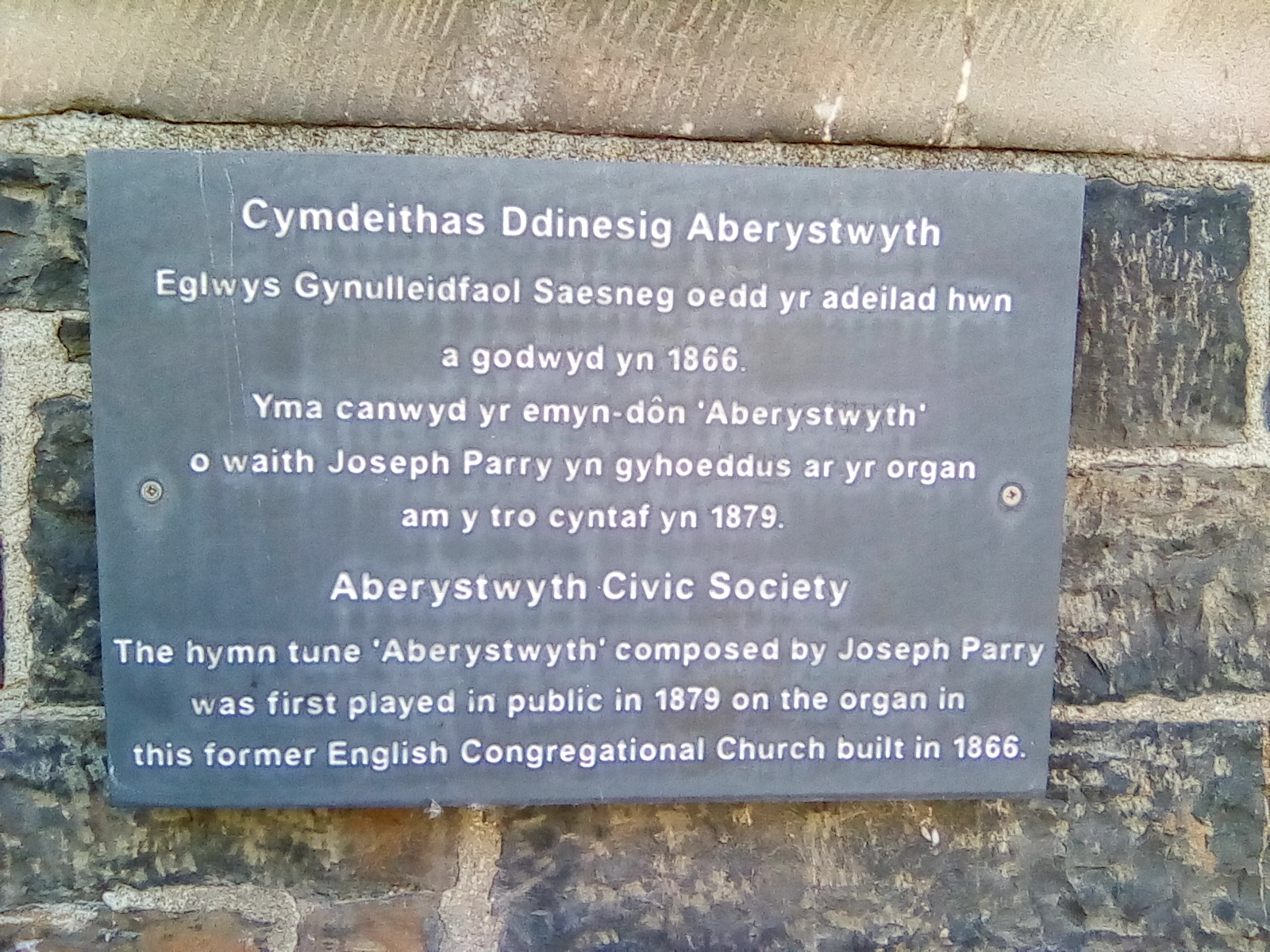
Plaque to commemorate the 1st performance of the hymn tune "Aberystwyth" on Aberystwyth town's former English Congregational church, now a medical surgery

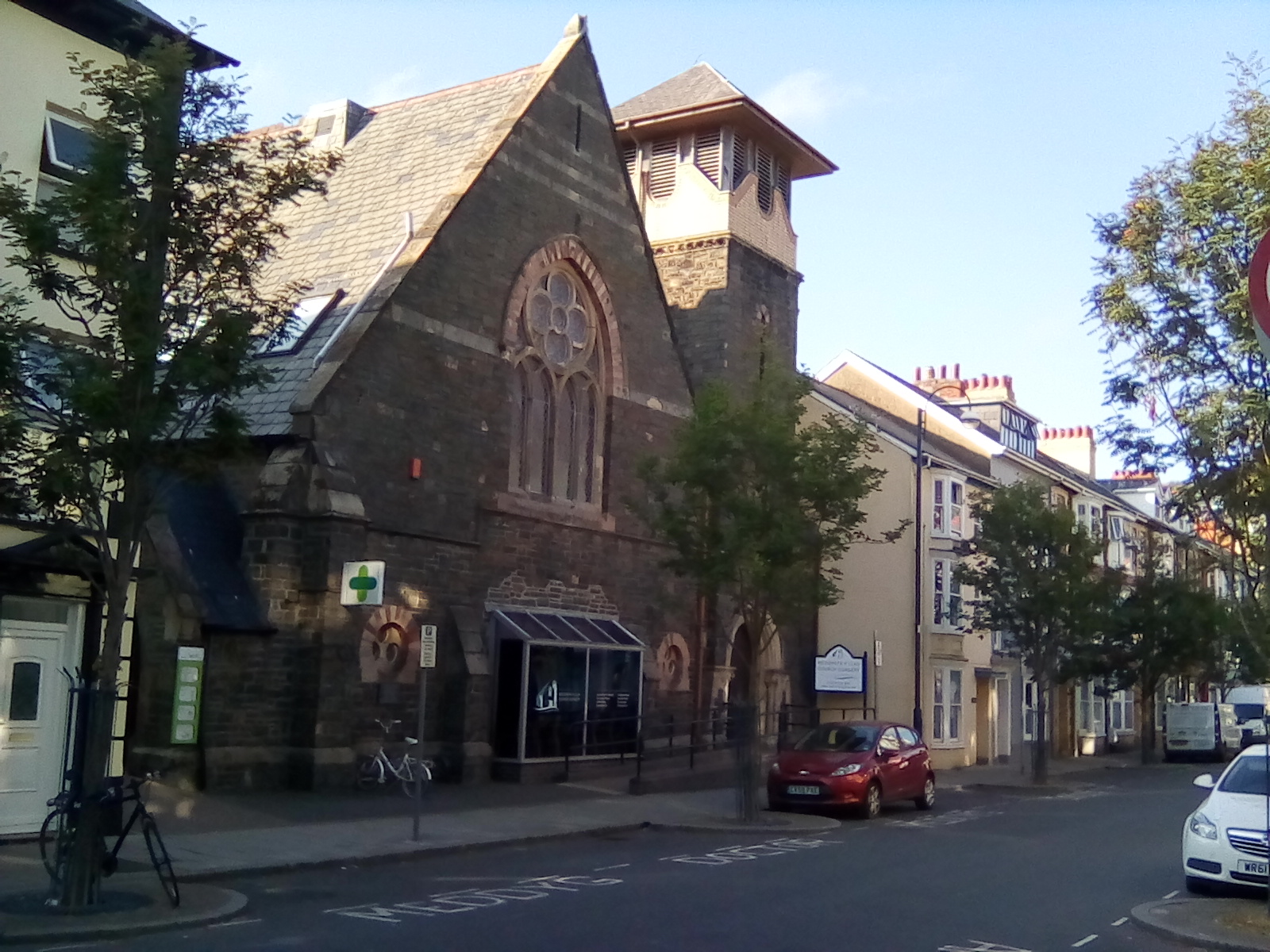
Church Surgery, Aberystwyth, formerly the English Congregationalist Church
