= David Griffith (Clwydfardd) =

Welsh poet

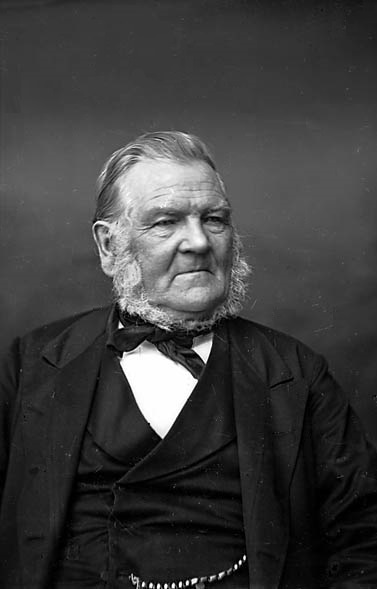
David Griffith (Clwydfardd)

David Griffith (29 November 1800 – 30 October 1894), known by the bardic name of Clwydfardd (Welsh for 'Bard of Clwyd'), was a Welsh poet and Archdruid of the National Eisteddfod of Wales.

== Early life ==
David Griffith was born on 29 November 1800 in Denbigh, Denbighshire, the son of Richard Griffith a watchmaker in that town. Clwydfardd was brought up to work in the same trade. In 1826 he became a local preacher with the Wesleyan Methodists.

== Literary legacy ==
Clwydfardd first came into prominence as a bard in 1824, when he won a silver medal at the Denbigh Eisteddfod for an ode on the Vale of Clwyd. In 1827 he won the prize at the Ruthin Eisteddfod for the best translation of Oliver Goldsmith's The Deserted Village. In August of the same year he won a prize for a poem on Difyrwch Helwriaeth (the Pleasures of Hunting).

Clwydfardd's book "Cyfaill yr Ysgolar" (The Scholar's Friend) was published in 1839. It was a guide to the correct use of the Welsh language, and how to use an effective writing style. In 1889 he published an edition of Edmund Prys's Salmau Cân (1621), a metrical translation of the Psalms into Welsh.

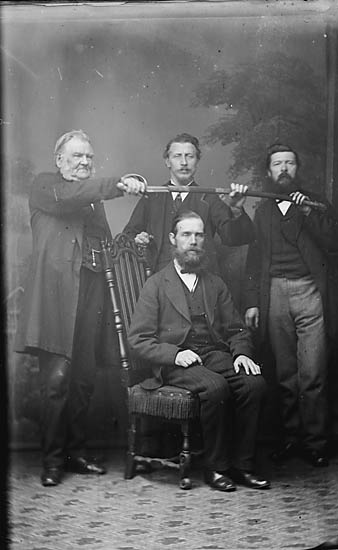
Chairing of the Bard at a National Eisteddfod, c. 1875. Clwydfardd is on the left, holding the sword handle. (studio re-enactment)

== Gorsedd career ==
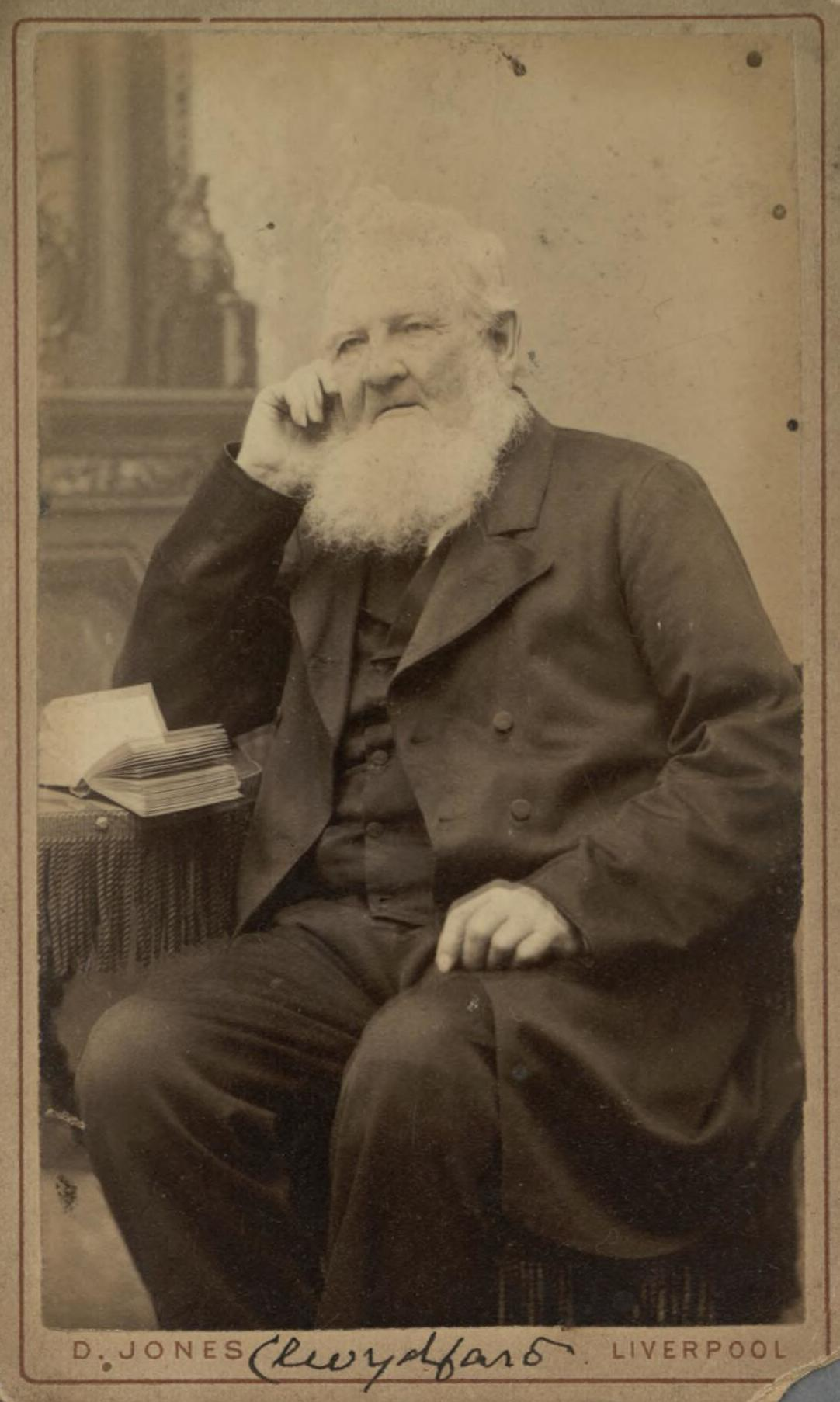
Portrait of an elderly "Clwydfardd", c.1880

When the Gorsedd was first invented by Iolo Morganwg in 1792 it was split into four regions or taleithiau: Cadair Gwynedd (north Wales), Cadair Powys (mid-Wales) Cadair Dyfed (west Wales) and Cadair Morgannwg Gwent (south east Wales). Clwydfardd was the first person to be acknowledged as an Archdruid with seniority over all of the Gorseddau, not just of Wales but of the Isle of Britain and, indeed, the world. There is some difficulty in working out when, exactly, he gained this supremacy. Clwydfardd himself stated: I was appointed Archdruid … in the year 1860; but it was in the Wrexham Eisteddfod in the year 1876 that I was licensed as the Archdruid of the Gorsedd … of the Bards of the Isle of Britain. The Gorsedd's website only acknowledges him as Archdruid from 1888. There is, however, little doubt that when he died he was accepted as the one and only Archdruid of Gorsedd Beirdd Ynys Prydain (The Throne of Bards of the Isle of Britain) and all of his successors have enjoyed the same title.

There is no extant record of when Clwydfardd was inducted into the Gorsedd; it was probably shortly after his success in the 1824 Eisteddfod. He was first recognised on a national level as a representative of the Gwynedd talaith of the Gorsedd in the National Eisteddfod of 1834 at Cardiff Castle by Taliesin ab Iolo. According to the Merthyr Guardian newspaper dated 31 August of that year, he had walked all the way from Denbigh to Cardiff (about 160 miles) in order to receive his honour.

The following year (1835) an Eisteddfod was held in the Gwynedd talaith in Llanerchymedd, Anglesey, where Clwydfardd was acclaimed as that Eisteddfod's Chief Bard.

== Publications ==
- Griffith, David Griffith (Clwydfardd) (c. 1839). Cyfaill yr ysgolor: yn cynwys sylwadau ar ddarllenyddiaeth, ac eglurhad ar droellegau yr Ysgrythyrau [The Scholar's Friend: containing remarks on the art of reading, and an explanation of the turns of speech of the Scriptures] (in Welsh). Caernarfon: Hugh Humphreys. OCLC 502534131.
- Griffith, David Griffith (Clwydfardd) (1889). Y salmau cân, gan yr Hybarch Archddiacon Prys: wedi en diwygio a'n hadgyweirio gan Clwydfardd (in Welsh). Liverpool: Isaac Foulkes. OCLC 557662961. An edition of Edmund Prys's Salmau Cân (1621), a metrical translation of the Psalms into Welsh.

== Biography ==
A biography of Clwydfardd was published by his great-grandson, also named David Griffith, in 2000.

- Griffith, David (2000). Right man, right time: David Griffith, 'Clwydfardd', the first archdruid of Wales. Bradford on Avon, Wiltshire: David Griffith. ISBN 9780953810505.

First None recognised before	Archdruid of the National Eisteddfod of Wales; 1876 or 1888 – 1894	Succeeded by Rowland Williams (Hwfa Môn)
