= Arthur Walsh, 2nd Baron Ormathwaite =

British politician

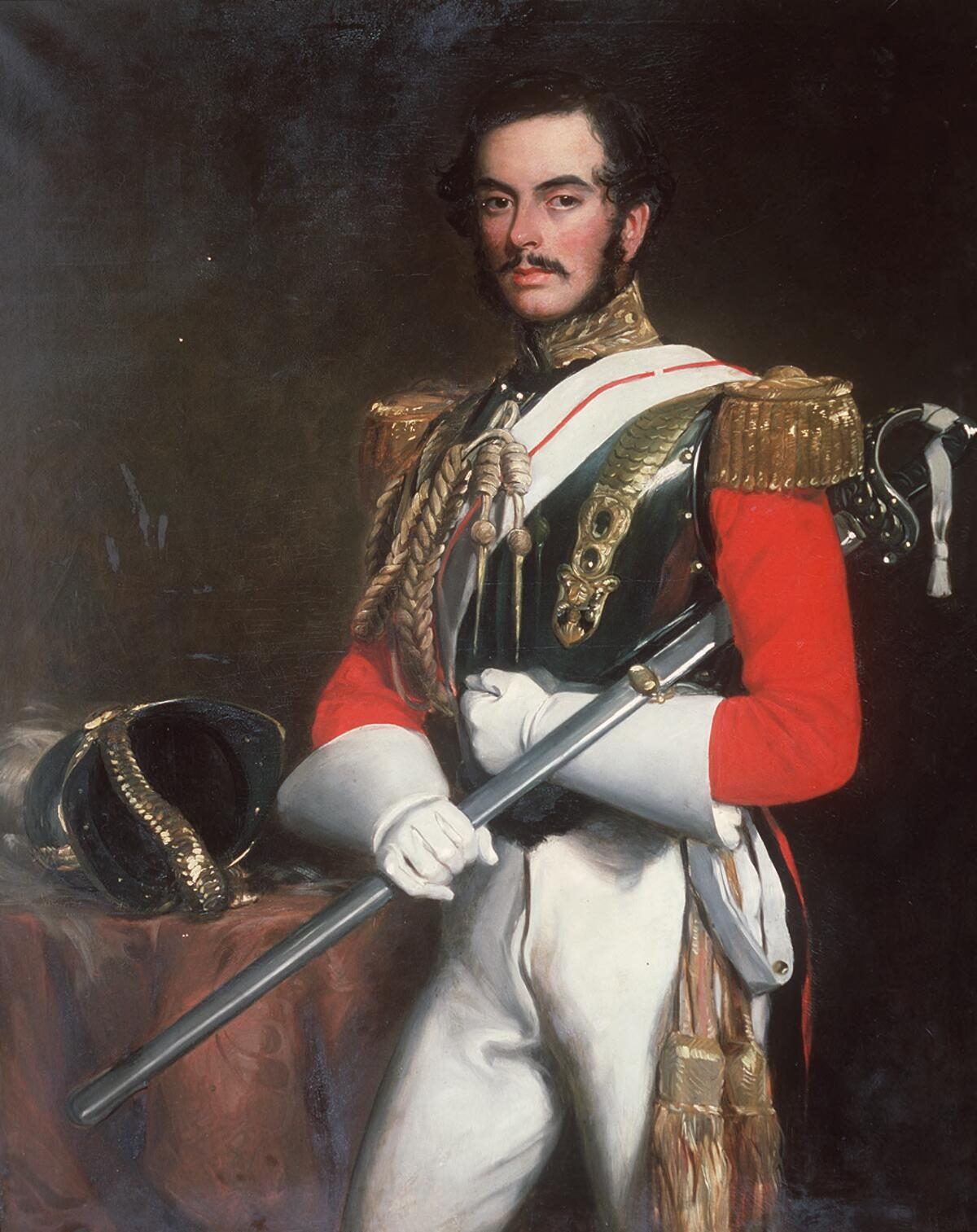
Arthur Walsh, 2nd Baron Ormathwaite, in the uniform of the 1st Life Guards.

Arthur Walsh, 2nd Baron Ormathwaite (14 April 1827 – 27 March 1920) was a British Conservative Party politician, the son of John Walsh, 1st Baron Ormathwaite.

== Career ==
He was commissioned as a cornet in the 1st Life Guards on 23 April 1847 and served in the regiment for a few years, becoming a captain.

He was elected as a member of parliament (MP) for Leominster in 1865, resigning in 1868 by becoming Steward of the Manor of Northstead. This allowed him to stand for Radnorshire and replace his father in the by-election that ensued after the latter was elevated to the peerage.

Walsh was appointed Lord Lieutenant of Radnorshire in 1875, a post he held until 1895. He was appointed Honorary Colonel of the Royal South Wales Borderers Militia on 30 December 1876, and retained the position after the regiment became the 3rd (Reserve) Battalion, South Wales Borderers in 1908.

He succeeded his father in the barony in 1881, and died in 1920.

== Family ==
He married, on 20 July 1858, Lady Katherine Emily Mary Somerset (born 1834, died 20 May 1914), daughter of Henry Somerset, 7th Duke of Beaufort. They had the following children:

- Hon Arthur Henry John Walsh, born 10 April 1859, succeeded as 3rd Baron Ormathwaite, died 13 March 1937
- Hon Charles Edward Walsh, born 3 July 1862, died 17 June 1909
- Hon George Harry William Walsh, born 3 December 1863, succeeded as 4th Baron Ormathwaite, died 27 October 1943
- Hon Gerald Walsh, born 16 December 1864, died 18 May 1925
- Hon Guy Robert Walsh, born 24 December 1865, died 11 May 1883
- Hon Nigel Christopher Walsh, born 2 April 1867, died 10 September 1931, leaving two daughters
- Hon Reginald Walsh, born 17 July 1868, succeeded as 5th Baron Ormathwaite, died 13 February 1944
- Hon Margaret Blanche Walsh, died 1 February 1925
- Hon Edith Katherine Walsh, died 7 May 1952
- Hon Emily Gertrude Walsh, died 10 December 1928

Parliament of the United Kingdom
Preceded by Charles Kincaid-Lennox; Gathorne Gathorne-Hardy	Member of Parliament for Leominster; 1865–1868; With: Gathorne Gathorne-Hardy 1865–1866; Richard Arkwright 1866–1868	Succeeded by Arthur Stanhope; Richard Arkwright
Preceded by Sir John Walsh, Bt	Member of Parliament for Radnorshire; 1868–1880	Succeeded by Sir Richard Green-Price, Bt
Honorary titles
Preceded by The Lord Ormathwaite	Lord Lieutenant of Radnorshire; 1875–1895	Succeeded by Sir Powlett Milbank, Bt
Peerage of the United Kingdom
Preceded by John Walsh	Baron Ormathwaite; 1881–1920	Succeeded by Arthur Walsh
