= Basil Jones =

British bishop (1822–1897)

The Right Reverend Basil Jones
- Bishop of St David's
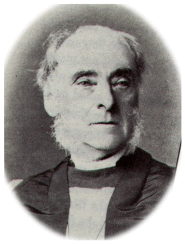
- Church: Church of England
- Province: Canterbury
- Diocese: St David's
- Installed: 1874
- Predecessor: Connop Thirlwall
- Successor: John Owen

Personal details
- Born: William Basil Jones; 2 January 1822 Cheltenham, Wales
- Died: 14 January 1897 (aged 75) Abergwili, Wales
- Denomination: Anglicanism
- Spouse: Frances Charlotte (m. 1856; died 1881); Anne Loxdale (m. 1886)

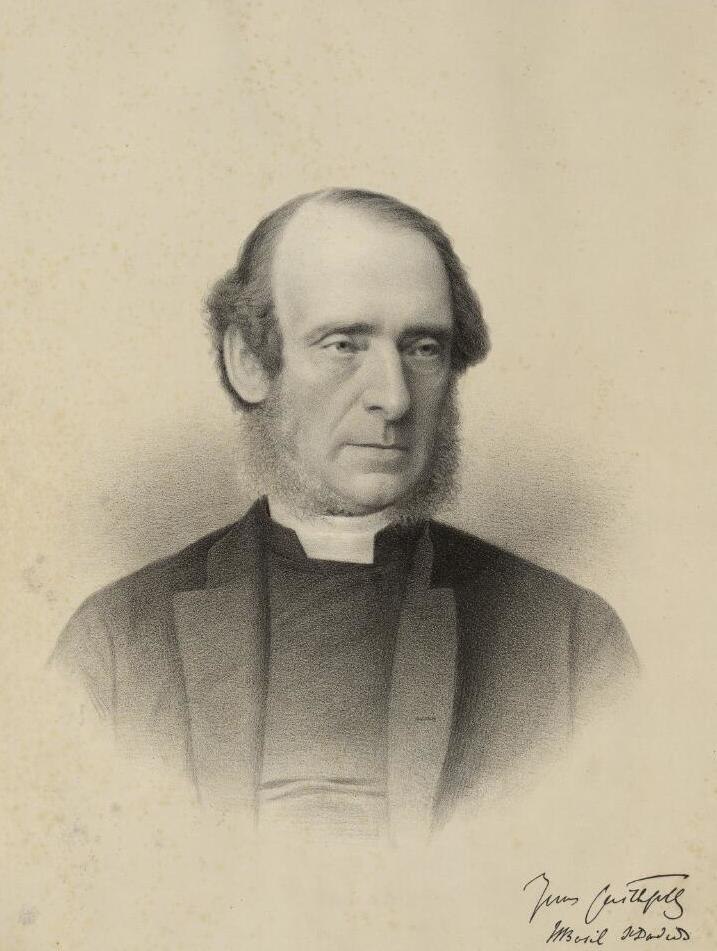
Portrait of Rev. William Basil Jones, c1875, signed by the sitter

William Basil Jones (1822–1897) was a Welsh bishop and scholar who became the Bishop of St David's in 1874, holding the post until his death in 1897.

== Personal history ==
Jones was born on 1 January 1822 in Cheltenham to William Tilsey Jones of Gwynfryn and his wife Jane. He was educated at Shrewsbury School, under the tutelage of Samuel Hall and Benjamin Hall Kennedy from 1834 to 1841, becoming head boy in his final year. In 1842 he matriculated to Trinity College, Oxford. He was placed in the second class in his final school of literae humaniores and in 1845 he graduated BA, receiving his MA in 1847. In 1848 Jones was elected to a Michel fellowship at Queen's College, but in 1851 he exchanged it for a fellowship at University College, Oxford, which he held until 1857. During his time as a fellow at University College he became assistant tutor and bursar, and from 1858 through to 1865 was a lecturer in modern history and the classics. He left Oxford in 1865.

During his time as a lecturer Jones married his first wife, Frances Charlotte Holworthy, second daughter of Samuel Holworthy, vicar of Croxall. They were married on 10 September 1856 and remained together until Frances' death on 21 September 1881; the couple remaining childless. Jones remarried on 2 December 1886, to Anne Loxdale. Anne bore him a son and two daughters and survived her husband.

While at Oxford, Jones showed himself to have a keen interest in archaeological and architectural affairs. He is credited for the design of his parish church at Llangynfelyn. From 1848 through to 1851 he was one of the general secretaries of the Cambrian Archaeological Association, and then joint editor of its journal, Archaeologia Cambrensis, in 1854. Jones was also secretary of the Oxford Architectural Society, and was part of a literary and philosophical society at Trinity known as Hermes. The society included other notable Trinity students, George Bowen, William Gifford Palgrave and Edward Augustus Freeman, all of whom were friends of Jones. Of his friendships made at Oxford, the one that endured was that with William Thomson who was also a past student at Shrewsbury School at the same time as Jones. Jones had been ordained deacon in 1848, and a priest in 1853, but after Thomson was made Bishop of Gloucester in 1861 he made Jones his examining chaplain. When Thomson was elevated to the office of Archbishop of York the next year he ensured that Jones was always close as an advisor, ensuring he held important posts in the York diocese, and in 1865 was presented with the vicarage of Bishopthorpe, where the episcopal palace is situated. Jones was soon recognised as Thomson's 'right-hand man', and a series of favourable appointments followed, with Jones becoming the Archdeacon of York in 1867, the rural dean of Bishopthorpe in 1869 and the chancellor of York in 1871.

== Bishop of St David's ==
In 1874 Connop Thirlwall, the Bishop of St David's, resigned the see and Jones was appointed as his successor by Prime Minister Benjamin Disraeli. His selection is believed to have been influenced by his scholarly work, his proven history as a clerical administrator, his past association with the Diocese of St David's and his ability, although limited, to speak Welsh. Jones in his earlier life had shown an interest in St David's Cathedral, raising a fund while at Oxford University for the restoration of the rood screen. He had also, along with his friend Edward Augustus Freeman, undertaken in writing an in-depth history of the cathedral.

Jones was consecrated bishop by the Archbishop of Canterbury, Archibald Tait, at Westminster Abbey on 14 August 1874, and was enthroned at St David's on 15 September of the same year. Jones, in his role as Bishop of St David's, continued the restoration work on existing churches but paid far more focus on the establishment of new mission churches; the number of churches consecrated by him annually was treble the figure of his predecessor. He also brought a far stricter regimen to the selection of candidates for ordination, requiring good testimonials, and preferring well educated men to those who were good orators. He also oversaw changes which saw the removal of non-resident posts, resulting in improvements in pastoral work. These improvements led to a progressive raising of the educational and spiritual standard of the ministry. After Jones' death, his successor, John Owen, wrote: 'The progress of the diocese during Bishop Jones' episcopate was far greater than the progress during any period of equal length since the Reformation', though it is recognised that much of his work built on reforms initiated by Thirlwall and before him Thomas Burgess.

During his time as the Bishop of St David's, a proposed division of the diocese, then the largest in Wales, was initiated. Jones was unhappy with the suggestion, but he accepted a reduced income to the diocese on condition that the endowment left would be larger than that of the other Welsh diocese.

In his role of Bishop of St David's, Jones had wide-ranging powers in the constitutional development of St David's College, Lampeter. Jones took this opportunity to enact the college with a complete code of statutes (1879) instead of the few provisional rules which it previously held. He also took an active part in the government of Christ's College, Brecon, becoming chairman of its board of governors in 1880.

He died at Abergwili Palace on 14 January 1897, and was buried six days later in the family vault at Llangynfelyn.

== Published works ==
- Vestiges of the Gael in Gwynedd, London (Tenby printed), 1851, 8vo.
- The History and Antiquities of St. David's written jointly with E. A. Freeman; issued in four parts, 1852–7 (Tenby)
- Notes on the Oedipus Tyrannus of Sophocles, adapted to the text of Dindorf, Oxford, 1862; 2nd ed. 1869.
- The New Testament illustrated by a Plain Commentary for Private Reading, 2 vols, London 1865; the second volume only was by Basil Jones, the first being by Archdeacon Churton.
- The Oedipus Rex of Sophocles with Notes, Oxford 1866, 8vo.
- The Peace of God: Sermons on the Reconciliation of God and Man, (chiefly preached before the University of Oxford), London 1869, 8vo.

Church of England titles
Preceded by Connop Thirlwall	Bishop of St David's; 1874–1897	Succeeded by John Owen
