= John Campbell, 2nd Earl Cawdor =

British politician

The Right Honourable The Earl Cawdor DL

Pembrokeshire County Councillor for Castlemartin
- In office 1889–1889

Lord Lieutenant of Carmarthenshire
- In office 1861–1898
- Monarch: Victoria
- Preceded by: The 1st Lord Cawdor
- Succeeded by: Sir James Williams-Drummond, 4th Baronet

Member of the House of Lords Lord Temporal
- In office 1860–1898
- Monarch: Victoria
- Preceded by: The 1st Lord Cawdor
- Succeeded by: The 3rd Lord Cawdor

Member of Parliament for Pembrokeshire
- In office 1841–1860
- Monarch: Victoria
- Preceded by: Sir John Owen, 1st Baronet
- Succeeded by: George Lort Phillips

Personal details
- Born: 11 June 1817
- Died: 29 March 1898 (aged 80)
- Spouse: Sarah Mary Compton Cavendish
- Children: 7 (including Frederick Campbell, 3rd Earl Cawdor
- Parents: John Campbell, 1st Earl Cawdor (father); Lady Elizabeth Thynne (mother)

John Frederick Vaughan Campbell, 2nd Earl Cawdor (11 June 1817 – 29 March 1898), was a British politician.

Campbell was the son of John Campbell, 1st Earl Cawdor, and Lady Elizabeth Thynne, daughter of 2nd Marquess of Bath. He was known as Viscount Emlyn until the death of his father in 1860.

As Viscount Emlyn, he served as Lord-in-waiting to Princess Mary, Duchess of Gloucester, at the 1838 coronation of Queen Victoria.

He married Sarah Mary Compton Cavendish, daughter of General Hon. Henry Frederick Compton-Cavendish and Sarah Fawkener, on 28 June 1842. They had seven children:

- Lady Victoria Alexandrina Elizabeth Campbell (24 Mar 1843 – 30 Mar 1909), who married Lt.-Col. Francis William Lambton, grandson of George Bussy Villiers, 4th Earl of Jersey and of Cuthbert Ellison, MP for Newcastle. They had one son, Cuthbert.
- Lady Muriel Sarah Campbell (27 May 1845 – 30 Sep 1934), Sir Courtenay Boyle, grandson of Edmund Boyle, 7th Earl of Cork. They had no known issue.
- Frederick Archibald Vaughan Campbell, 3rd Earl Cawdor (13 Feb 1847 – 08 Feb 1911)
- Capt. Hon. Ronald George Elidor Campbell (30 Dec 1848 – 28 Mar 1879); he married Katharine Susanna Claughton, daughter of Rev. Thomas Legh Claughton, Bishop of St Albans. They had four children, including Brig.-Gen. John Vaughan Campbell, and Rev. Guy Ronald, later husband of the Hon. Vere Annesley, daughter of Arthur Annesley, 11th Viscount Valentia.
- Lady Evelyn Caroline Louise Campbell (24 Jul 1851 – Oct 1909); unmarried.
- Lady Rachel Anne Georgina Campbell (04 Jul 1853 – 06 Oct 1906); she married, as his first wife, Sir Edward Stafford Howard MP. They had three children.
- Hon. Alexander Francis Henry Campbell (3 Sep 1855 – 5 Mar 1929), married Constance Pleydell-Bouverie, great-granddaughter of Jacob Pleydell-Bouverie, 2nd Earl of Radnor and Sir William à Court, 1st Baronet.

== Political career ==
Cawdor, as Lord Emlyn, served as MP for Pembrokeshire from 1841 until 1860.

In later life he participated in local politics and was elected unopposed for Castlemartin at the first elections to Pembrokeshire County Council in 1889.

Parliament of the United Kingdom
Preceded by Sir John Owen, Bt	Member of Parliament for Pembrokeshire; 1841–1860	Succeeded by George Lort Phillips
Honorary titles
Preceded by The Earl Cawdor	Lord Lieutenant of Carmarthenshire; 1861–1898	Succeeded by Sir James Williams-Drummond, Bt
Peerage of the United Kingdom
Preceded by John Frederick Campbell	Earl Cawdor; 1860–1898	Succeeded by Frederick Archibald Campbell
