= James Colquhoun Campbell =

British bishop (1813–1895)

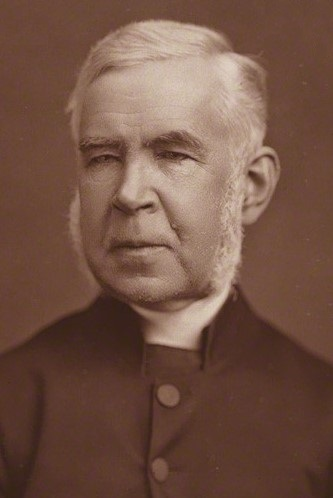
Bishop Campbell

James Colquhoun Campbell (27 December 1813 – 9 November 1895) was a Welsh Anglican bishop.

Born at Stonefield, Argyllshire, he was the son of John Campbell and his wife Wilhelmina, the daughter of Sir James Colquhoun, 2nd Baronet. Campbell was educated in Chester and then at Trinity College, Cambridge, where he graduated B.A. in 1836, M.A. in 1839, D.D. in 1859.

Campbell was Rector of St Nicholas, Cardiff in 1839, then became vicar in Roath in 1840 and was subsequently appointed rector in Merthyr Tydfil in 1844. He was nominated Archdeacon of Llandaff in 1857 and was consecrated 70th Bishop of Bangor in 1859. After more than thirty years in this post, Campbell retired in 1890 and died at Hastings five years later.

In 1840, he married Blanche, the daughter of John Bruce Pryce and sister of Henry Bruce, 1st Baron Aberdare.

Church in Wales titles
Preceded by Thomas Williams	Archdeacon of Llandaff; 1857–1859	Succeeded by Henry Lynch Blosse
Preceded by Christopher Bethell	Bishop of Bangor; 1859–1890	Succeeded by Daniel Lewis Lloyd
