= 1880s in Wales =

- 1870s | 1890s | Other years in Wales
- Other events of the decade

This article is about the particular significance of the decade 1880–1889 to Wales and its people.

== Incumbents ==
- Archdruid of the National Eisteddfod of Wales – Clwydfardd

== Events ==
- 1880
- 1881
- 1882
- 1883
- 1884
- 1885
- 1886
- 1887
- 1888
- 1889

== Arts and literature ==
=== Awards ===
National Eisteddfod of Wales

- 1880 – Caernarfon
- 1881 – Merthyr Tydfil
  - Chair – Evan Rees ("Dyfed")
  - Crown – Watkin Hezekiah Williams
- 1882 – Denbigh
  - Chair – withheld
  - Crown – Dafydd Rees Williams
- 1883 – Cardiff
  - Chair – withheld
  - Crown – Anna Walter Thomas
- 1884 – Liverpool
  - Chair – Evan Rees ("Dyfed")
  - Crown – Edward Foulkes
- 1885 – Aberdare
  - Chair – Watkin Hezekiah Williams
  - Crown – Griffith Tecwyn Parry
- 1886 – Caernarfon
  - Chair – Richard Davies
  - Crown – John Cadfan Davies
- 1887 – London
  - Chair – Robert Arthur Williams
  - Crown – John Cadfan Davies
- 1888 – Wrexham
  - Chair – Thomas Tudno Jones
  - Crown – Howell Elvet Lewis
- 1889 – Brecon
  - Chair – Evan Rees
  - Crown – Howell Elvet Lewis

=== New books ===
- Rhoda Broughton – Doctor Cupid (1886)
- Richard Davies (Mynyddog) – Pedwerydd Llyfr Mynyddog (1882)
- Amy Dillwyn
  - The Rebecca Rioter (1880)
  - Jill and Jack(1887)
- Daniel Silvan Evans – Dictionary of the Welsh Language (Geiriadur Cymraeg) (1887)
- Frances Hoggan – Education for Girls in Wales (1882)
- Daniel Owen
  - Y Dreflan (1881)
  - Rhys Lewis (1885)
- Robert Williams (Trebor Mai) – Gwaith Barddonol Trebor Mai (1883)

== Sport ==
- 1881 – Welsh Rugby Union is formed.
- 1884 – The Cardiff Arms Park hosts its first rugby international (between Wales and Ireland).
- 1889 – In a football match between Wales and Scotland at Wrexham, the referee allows the injured Welsh goalkeeper to be replaced – the first ever substitution in a soccer match.

== Births ==
- 1880
  - 30 April – George Maitland Lloyd Davies, pacifist (died 1949)
  - 9 May – Thomas Scott-Ellis, 8th Baron Howard de Walden, patron of the arts (died 1946)
  - 11 May – David Davies, 1st Baron Davies, politician (died 1944)
  - 22 June – Rhys Gabe, rugby player (died 1967)
  - 2 September – Isaac Daniel Hooson, poet (died 1948)
  - 15 September – William Charles Williams, VC recipient (died 1915)
  - date unknown
    - Edward Tegla Davies, author (died 1967)
    - Harry Grindell Matthews, inventor (died 1941)
- 1881
  - 3 January – Lewis Pugh Evans, VC recipient (died 1962)
  - 14 February – William John Gruffydd, academic and politician (died 1954)
  - 16 April – Ifor Williams, academic (died 1965)
  - 5 May – Rupert Price Hallowes, VC recipient (died 1915)
  - 16 June – David Grenfell, politician (died 1968)
  - 20 June – John Crichton-Stuart, 4th Marquess of Bute, landowner (died 1947)
  - August – John Lewis, footballer (died 1954)
  - 30 September – Philip Lewis Griffiths, lawyer (died 1945)
  - 28 October – Edward Evans, 1st Baron Mountevans, explorer (died 1957)
  - December – George Hall, politician (died 1965)
  - date unknown
    - David Thomas ("Afan"), composer (died 1928)
    - Robert Williams, trade union leader
- 1882
  - 24 July – Reginald Clarry, politician (died 1945)
  - 6 November – David Rees Griffiths, poet (died 1953)
  - 16 December – Cyril Fox, archaeologist (died 1967)
  - date unknown – Ivor Lewis, artist (died 1958)
- 1883
  - 30 April – David John de Lloyd, composer (died 1948)
  - 28 May – Clough Williams-Ellis, architect (died 1978)
  - 13 September – Percy Thomas, architect (died 1969)
  - date unknown
    - John Jones (Tydu), poet (died 1968)
    - James Walker, politician
- 1884
  - 19 February – Clement Davies, politician (died 1962)
  - 24 November – Jack Jones, novelist (died 1970)
  - date unknown
    - Arthur Jenkins, politician (died 1946)
    - Thomas Jones, footballer (died 1958)
- 1885
  - 2 August – Clarence Bruce, 3rd Baron Aberdare (died 1957)
  - 21 November – Robert Evans, footballer (died 1965)
  - date unknown
    - Ernest Evans, politician (died 1965)
    - David John Williams, writer and politician (died 1970)
- 1886
  - 3 May – Morgan Jones, Welsh politician (died 1939)
  - 29 September – Jack Williams, VC recipient (died 1953)
- 1887
  - 13 January – Hedd Wyn, poet (died 1917)
  - 27 February – James Dickson Innes, painter (died 1914)
  - date unknown
    - Huw Menai, poet (died 1961)
- 1888
  - 21 May – William Cove, politician (died 1963)
  - 16 August – T. E. Lawrence, writer and war hero (died 1935)
  - 19 October – Peter Freeman, politician (died 1956)
  - 5 September – Rhys Hopkin Morris, politician (died 1956)
- 1889
  - 1 February – John Lewis, philosopher (died 1976)
  - 11 December – Cedric Morris, artist (died 1982)
