= 1890s in Wales =

- 1880s | 1900 | Other years in Wales
- Other events of the decade

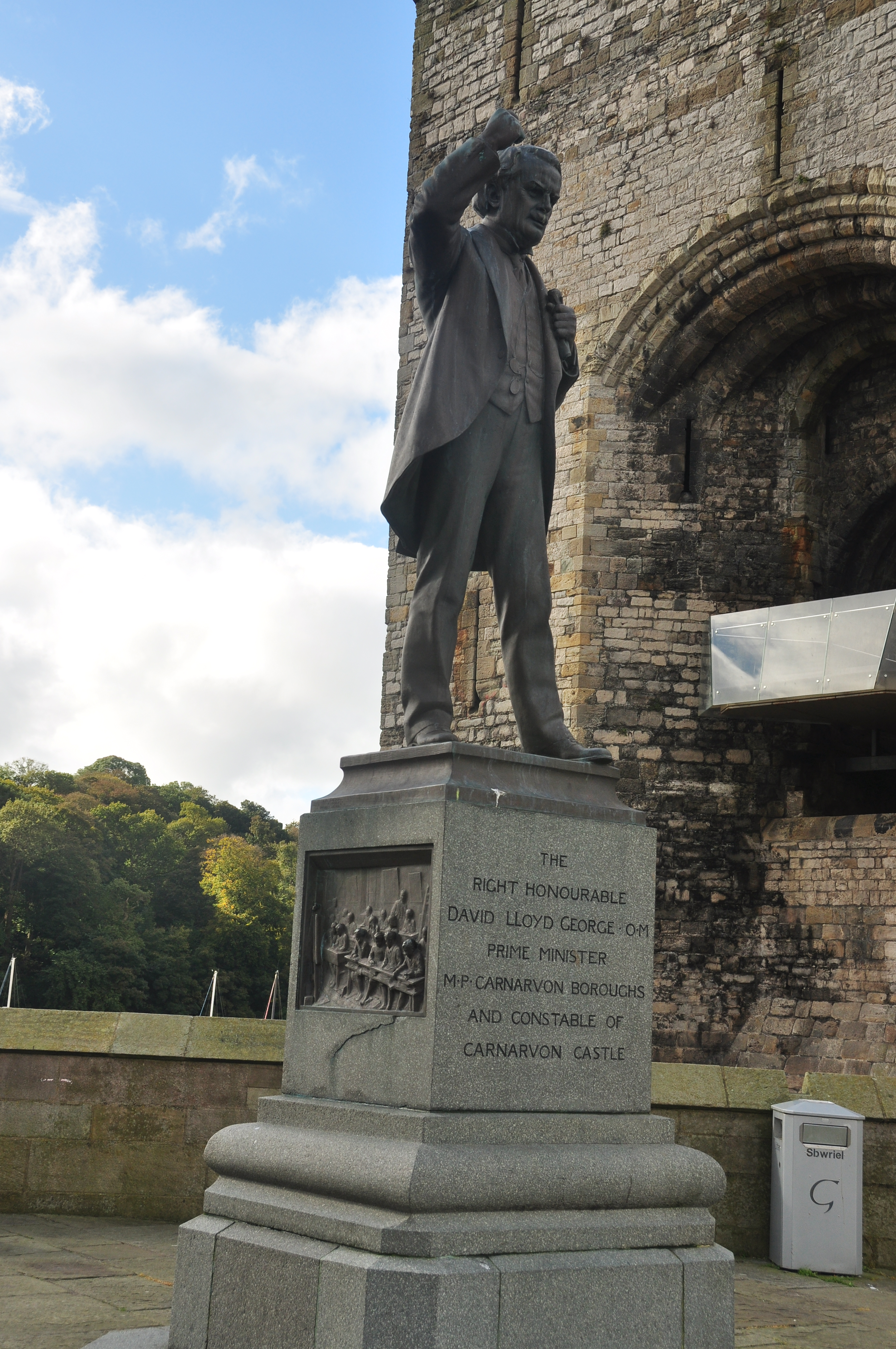
Lloyd George statue in Caernarfon

This article is about the particular significance of the decade 1890–1899 to Wales and its people.

== Incumbents ==
- Archdruid of the National Eisteddfod of Wales
  - Clwydfardd (to 1894)
  - Hwfa Môn (from 1895)

== Events ==
- Events of 1890
- Events of 1891
- Events of 1892
- Events of 1893
- Events of 1894
- Events of 1895
- Events of 1896
- Events of 1897
- Events of 1898
- Events of 1899

== Arts and literature ==
=== Awards ===
National Eisteddfod of Wales

- 1890 – Bangor
  - Chair – Thomas Tudno Jones
  - Crown – John John Roberts
- 1891 – Swansea
  - Chair – John Owen Williams
  - Crown – David Adams
- 1892 – Rhyl
  - Chair – Evan Jones
  - Crown – John John Roberts
- 1893 – Pontypridd
  - Chair – John Ceulanydd Williams
  - Crown – Ben Davies
- 1894 – Caernarfon
  - Chair – Howell Elvet Lewis
  - Crown – Ben Davies
- 1895 – Llanelli
  - Chair – John Owen Williams
  - Crown – Lewis William Lewis
- 1896 – Llandudno
  - Chair – Ben Davies
  - Crown – withheld
- 1897 – Newport
  - Chair – John Thomas Job
  - Crown – Thomas Mafonwy Davies
- 1898 – Blaenau Ffestiniog
  - Chair – Robert Owen Hughes
  - Crown – Richard Roberts
- 1899 – Cardiff
  - Chair – withheld
  - Crown – Richard Roberts

=== New books ===
- Anne Beale – Old Gwen (1890)
- Rhoda Broughton
  - Alas! (1890)
  - Mrs Bligh (1892)
  - Foes in Law (1899)
- Caniadau Cymru (anthology) (1897)
- Amy Dillwyn – Maggie Steele's Diary (1892)
- Owen Morgan Edwards – Cymru (1892)
- Beriah Gwynfe Evans – Dafydd Dafis (1898)
- John Gruffydd Moelwyn Hughes – Caniadau Moelwyn (1893)
- Arthur Machen – The Three Impostors (1895)
- Daniel Owen – Enoc Huws (1891)

=== Film ===
- 1896 – The first news film ever shot in Britain shows the Prince and Princess of Wales visiting an exhibition in Cardiff. This was also the first ever motion picture of the prince.

=== Music ===
- Sir Henry Walford Davies – Symphony in D (1894)
- Joseph Parry – Saul of Tarsus (oratorio) (1892)

== Sport ==
- Horse racing – The Welsh Grand National is run for the first time, at Ely, Cardiff.

== Births ==
- 1890
  - 21 June – W. J. A. Davies, rugby player (died 1967)
  - 16 December – P. J. Grigg, politician (died 1964)
- 1891
  - 13 February – Kate Roberts, author (died 1985)
- 1893
  - 15 January – Ivor Novello, composer and actor (died 1951)
  - date unknown – Lewis Valentine, political activist
- 1894
  - 23 June – Prince Edward (later Prince of Wales, Edward VIII and finally Duke of Windsor; died 1972)
  - date unknown – Ambrose Bebb, author and politician (died 1955)
- 1895
  - 22 January – Iorwerth Thomas, politician (died 1966)
  - 1 March – William Richard Williams, civil servant (died 1963)
  - date unknown – Albert Evans-Jones ("Cynan"), poet and Archdruid (died 1970)
- 1896
  - 1 May – Hubert William Lewis, VC recipient (died 1977)
- 1897
  - 15 November – Aneurin Bevan, politician (died 1960)
- 1898
  - 10 February – Thomas Jones, Baron Maelor, politician (died 1984)
  - 29 July – Dorothy Rees, politician (died 1987)
  - 24 September – Henry Arthur Evans, politician (died 1958)
  - date unknown – William John Edwards, cerdd dant singer (died 1978)
- 1899
  - 17 May – H. H. Price, philosopher (died 1984)
  - 20 December – Martyn Lloyd-Jones, preacher (died 1981)
  - date unknown – Len Davies, footballer (died 1945)

== Deaths ==
- 1890
  - 17 January – Christopher Rice Mansel Talbot, landowner (born 1803)
  - 20 January – Guillermo Rawson, Argentinian politician and patron of Patagonian Welsh colony (born 1821)
  - 19 March – Edmund Swetenham, MP for Caernarfon
  - 29 June – Henry Herbert, 4th Earl of Carnarvon (born 1831)
  - 20 July – David Davies "Llandinam", industrialist (born 1818)
- 1891
  - 26 September – David Charles Davies, Nonconformist leader (born 1826)
  - date unknown
  - Sir Love Jones-Parry, politician (born 1832)
  - Hugh Owen Thomas, pioneering orthopaedic surgeon (born 1834)
- 1893
  - 23 January – Dr William Price, eccentric (born 1800)
- 1894
  - 24 February – John Roberts, politician (born 1835)
- 1895
  - 15 January – Lady Charlotte Guest, translator of the Mabinogion (born 1812)
  - 22 October – Daniel Owen, novelist (born 1836)
- 1896
  - 17 January – Augusta Hall, Baroness Llanover, patron of the arts (born 1802)
  - 30 December – Evan Herber Evans, Nonconformist leader (born 1836)
- 1897
  - 15 October – Charles John Vaughan, former Dean of Llandaff (born 1816)
- 1898
  - 17 June – Sir Edward Burne-Jones, artist (born 1833)
  - 28 September – Thomas Gee, publisher (born 1815)
  - 2 December – Michael D. Jones, Patagonian settler (born 1822)
- 1899
  - 5 April – T. E. Ellis, politician (born 1859)
  - August – Owen Glynne Jones, mountaineer (born 1867)
