= Gold working in the Bronze Age British Isles =

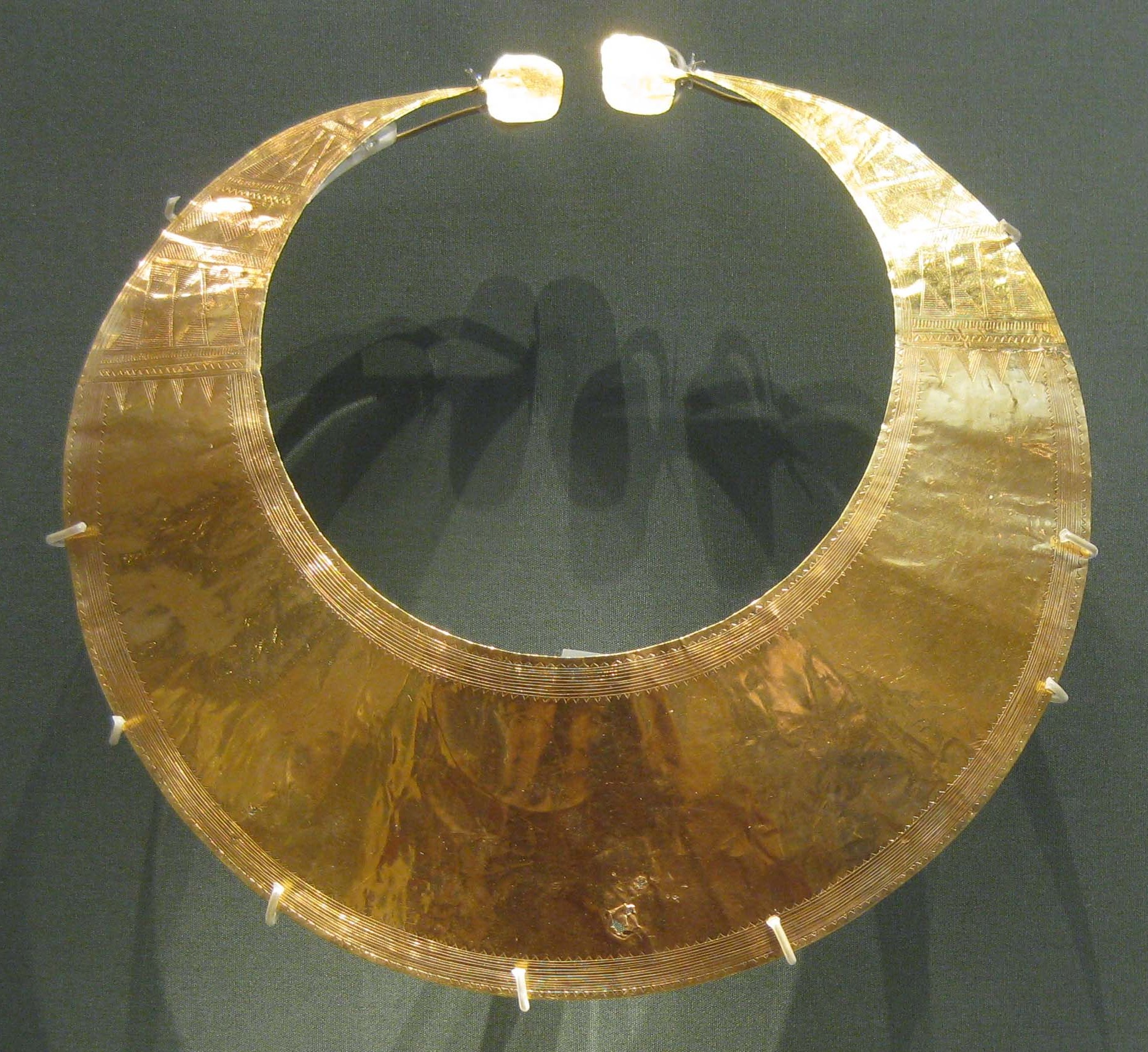
A gold lunula, a type of ornament produced in the early Bronze Age British Isles, especially Ireland. This example was found in Blessington, eastern Ireland. British Museum

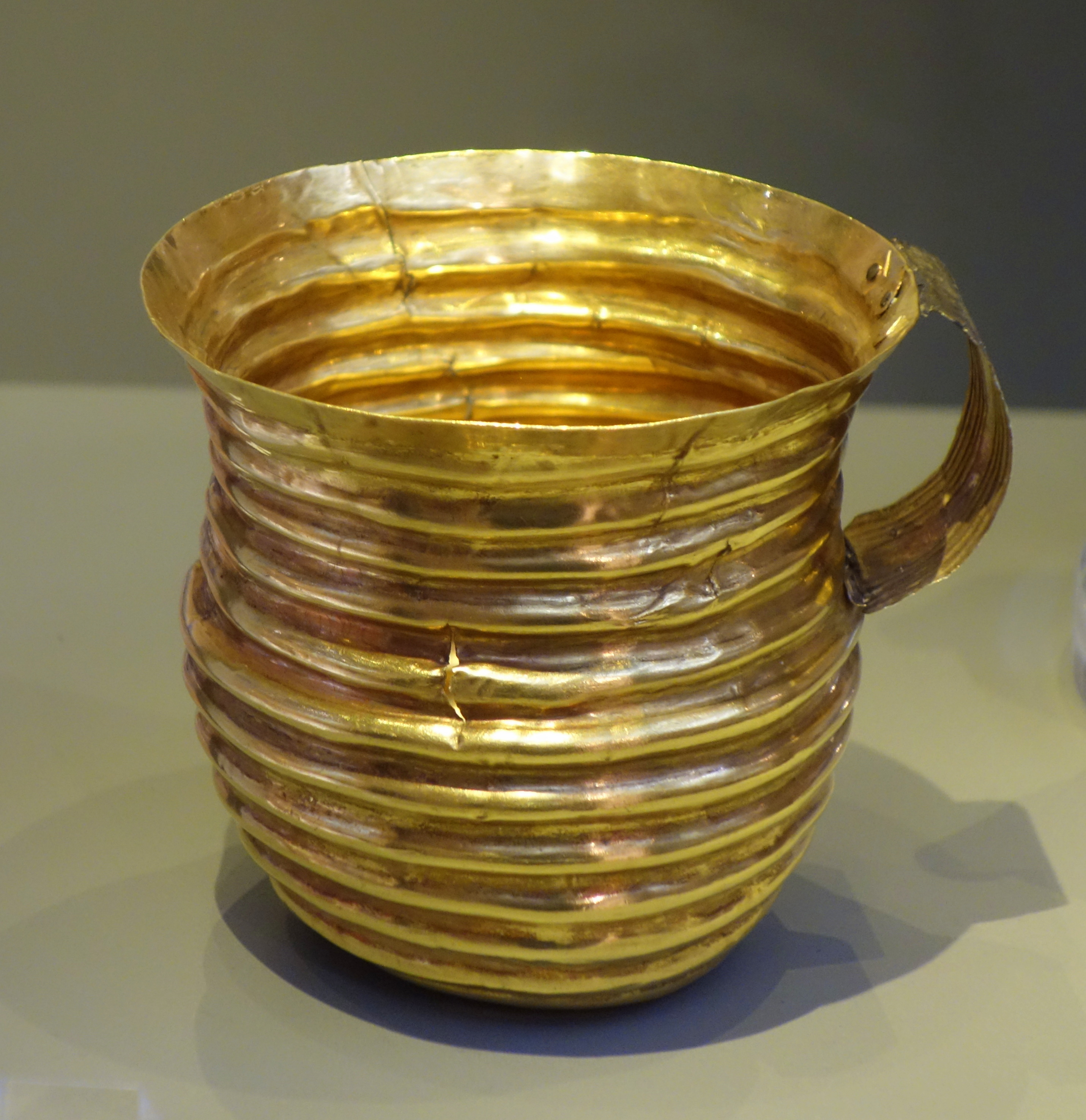
Rillaton Cup, one of two similar cups found in Britain. British Museum

Gold working in the Bronze Age British Isles refers to the use of gold to produce ornaments and other prestige items in the British Isles during the Bronze Age, between c. 2500 and c. 800 BCE in Britain, and up to about 550 BCE in Ireland. In this period, communities in Britain and Ireland first began to work metal, leading to the widespread creation of not only gold but also copper and bronze items as well. Gold artefacts in particular were prestige items used to designate the high status of those individuals who wore, or were buried with them.

Around 1,500 gold objects dating to the Bronze Age survive in collections, around 1000 of them from Ireland and the other 500 from Britain; this is a much smaller number than would have been originally crafted, leading archaeologists to believe that "many thousands of gold objects were made and used" in the Bronze Age British Isles.

Records indicate that Bronze Age gold artefacts had begun to be discovered by the 18th century at the least, although at the time many were melted down or lost. Only with the rise of the antiquarian and then archaeological movements were the antiquity of these items recognised, after which they were more usually preserved in collections. The archaeologist George Eogan noted that investigation of Bronze Age gold artefacts revealed not only "the work of craftsmen and technicians" from that period but also aided our understanding of "broader aspects of society such as social stratification, trade, commerce and ritual."

== Background ==
=== Gold and gold-working in prehistoric Europe ===
In prehistory gold could be found in several areas of Europe; the Carpathian region, Iberia, south-western France, Brittany, Britain and Ireland. The latter in particular had rich gold reserves, and as such has been labelled an "ancient El Dorado". Across the world, and in many cultures, gold has been highly valued as a precious metal, in part because of its rarity and also because of its properties; for instance, unlike bronze it is malleable, flexible and homogenous, and can be worked by hammering, rather than having to be worked through casting, annealing or soldering. Any products made from gold do not corrode, but instead have what has been described as an "intrinsic beauty", with many prehistoric peoples probably ascribing gold items a "symbolic as well as a decorative function".

=== Bronze Age Britain and Ireland ===
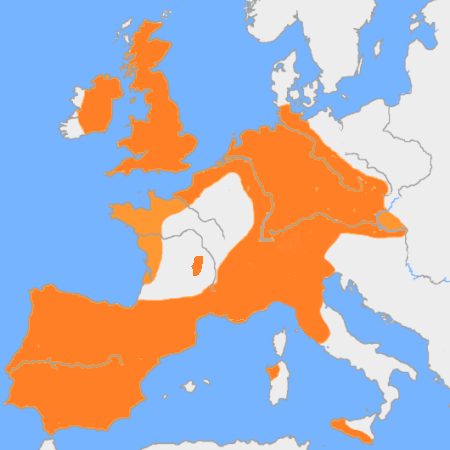
The extent of the "Beaker Package" across Europe, which was accompanied by the use of Beaker pottery, metal and specialised burials.

First developed in 1836 by Danish archaeologist Christian Jürgensen Thomsen as a part of his "Three-age system", the term "Bronze Age" is used by archaeologists to refer to those societies which have developed bronze technology but not yet learned how to work the more complicated process involved in making iron objects. The European Bronze Age lasted from c. 3200 BCE, when the Aegean civilizations of Greece first developed bronze technology, right through to c. 600 BCE, when the Nordic Bronze Age came to an end with the development of iron among Scandinavian communities.

The period known by archaeologists as Bronze Age Britain lasted from c. 2500 BCE through to c. 800 BCE, and was defined by the adoption of copper and bronze technologies on the island. Bronze Age Ireland followed a similar, yet distinct course.

The Early Bronze Age in the British Isles was marked by the adoption of what archaeologists call the "Beaker culture", which had arrived from continental Europe. Eogan noted that the "evidence from archaeology is that Beaker-using communities were the earliest metallurgists in Britain and Ireland", with their produce including "copper artefacts such as tanged daggers but also gold objects as well as the use of gold for embellishment."

== Styles and development ==
Bronze Age goldwork is marked by an elegant simplicity of design and fine execution, with decoration usually restricted to relatively simple geometric patterns such as parallel lines, chevron, zig-zag and circular patterns, often extremely small and perfectly executed, especially in Ireland, as can be seen by enlarging the lunula and Irish bracelet illustrated. The objects are nearly all pieces of jewellery, and include clothes-fasteners (somewhat like large one-piece cuff-links), torcs, bracelets, gold lunulae. A number of gold finger rings have been recorded, including the elaborately decorated Knaresborough Ring. Other finds are smaller ornaments that were perhaps worn in the ear, nose or hair, or on clothing as brooches, and a range of thin disc or plaques probably sewn to clothing or worn in the hair. The ends of objects that are essentially bars bent into a round shape often thicken before ending in a flat or concave face, as for example in the Milton Keynes Hoard. The thickening is typically slight in torcs and bracelets, but extreme in clothes fasteners and ear decorations. Tightly wound spirals in pairs are popular, as they were on the continent.

=== Early Bronze Age ===
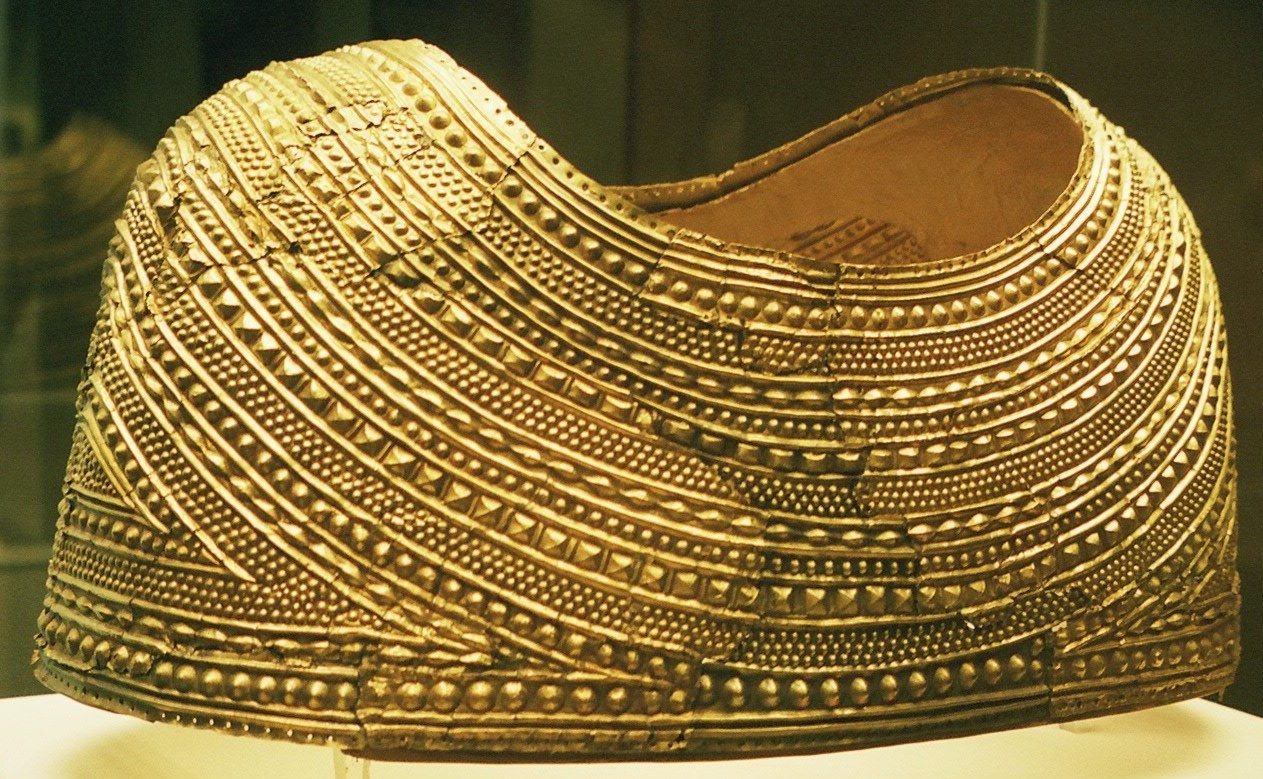
The Mold Cape is a unique survival from North Wales. British Museum

Eogan (1994) noted that around 250 surviving gold objects are known to date to the Early Bronze Age, 165 of those from Ireland, and the other 83 from Britain. From analysing the designs of the earliest gold artefacts in Britain, Eogan noted that they "form a homogeneous group" which, when "taken in conjunction with other metal types demonstrate that a new technology was introduced." Early Bronze Age pieces are generally much smaller, with very thin decorated discs or plaques common. Two small gold cups have been found in England, the Rillaton Cup and the similar but now crushed Ringlemere Cup.

Due to its natural resources, Ireland had a "rich Early Bronze Age [metal-working] industry", producing large quantities of metal axes, halberds and daggers, and as a part of this also had a "major gold industry", seeing the production of lunulae and gold disks on a far larger scale than Britain.

=== Late Bronze Age ===
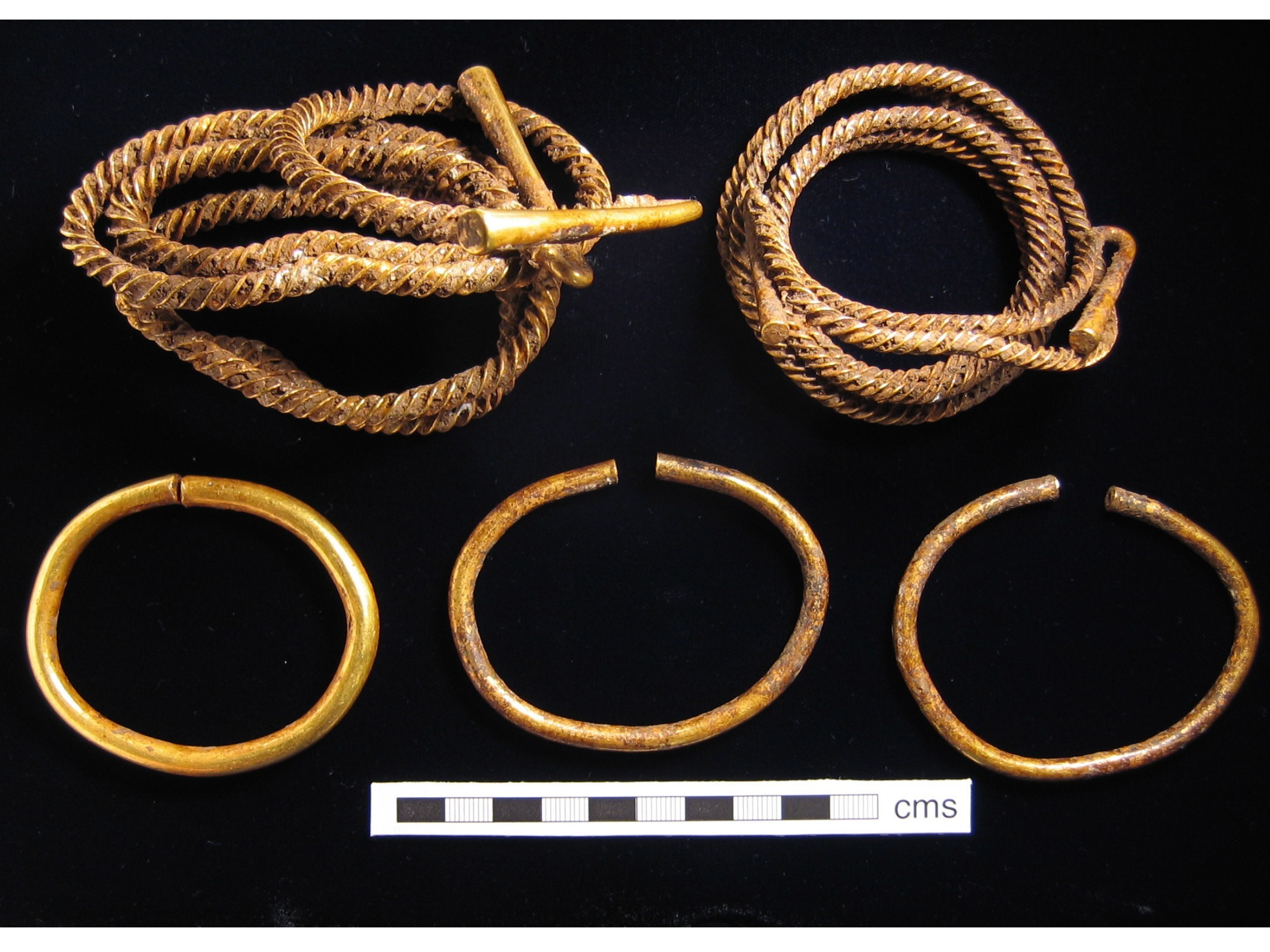
The Lambourn Hoard, from Lambourn, Berkshire, with three bracelets and two folded twisted torcs (West Berkshire Museum).

The transition to the Late Bronze Age brought societal change to the British Isles, and also apparently increased availability of gold, which led to a trend of much larger and more massive pieces. The largest were jewellery worn round the neck in a range of styles, the most ostentatious wide flat collars or gorgets with ribbed decoration following the shape of the piece, and round discs at the side. The Mold Cape is unique among survivals, but fits in with the trend to massive pieces emphasizing the neck and chest. It was clearly not for prolonged wear, as the wearer could not raise their arms. In Ireland, lunulae were probably replaced as neck ornaments firstly by gold torcs, found from the Irish Middle Bronze Age, and then in the Late Bronze Age by the spectacular "gorgets" of thin ribbed gold, some with round discs at the side, of which 9 examples survive, 7 in the National Museum of Ireland.

Designs based on twisted bars or ribbons giving a spiral became popular, probably influenced by the Continent. "Although over 110 identifiable British [includes Ireland] ribbon torcs are known, the dating of these simple, flexible ornaments is elusive", perhaps indicating "a long-lived preference for ribbon torcs, which continued for over 1,000 years", into the Iron Age.

== Gold in Bronze Age society ==
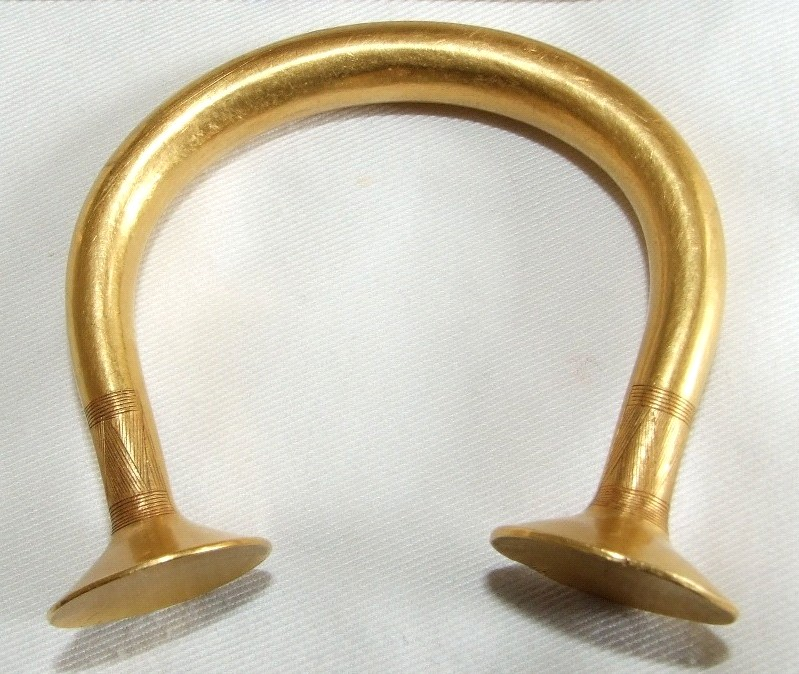
Irish bracelet, c. 950 – c. 800 BC, using a shape that is varied across a range of sizes and functions.

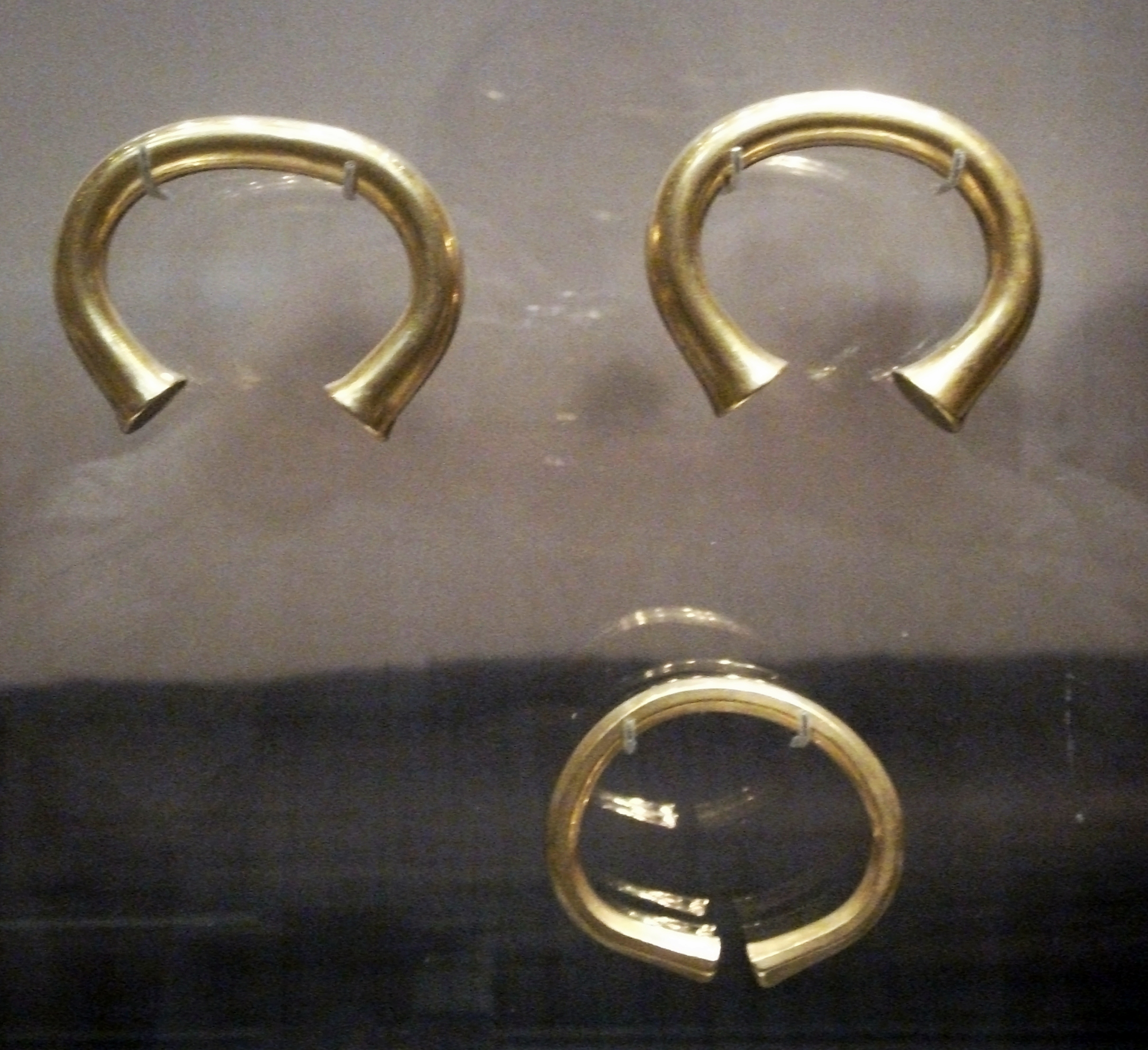
Bracelets from the Milton Keynes Hoard (British Museum).

=== Social stratification ===
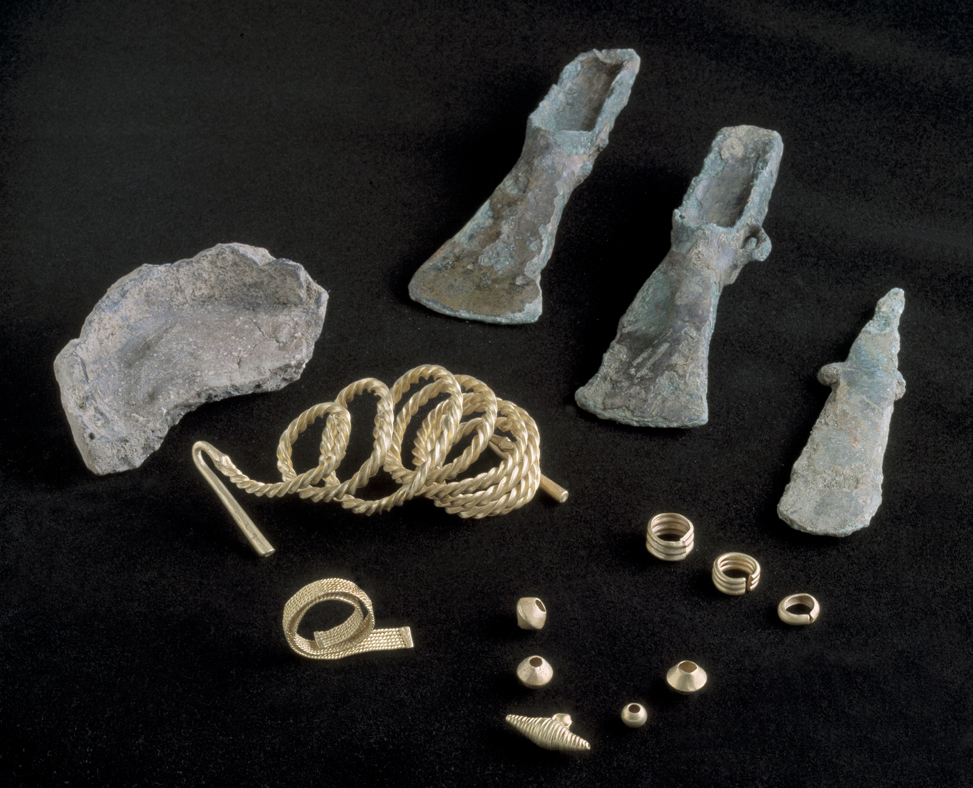
The Burton Hoard, from Burton, Wrexham. The gold items are a folded torc, a twisted-wire bracelet, a necklace pendant, 4 beads and 3 rings (National Museum Wales).

In Bronze Age Britain, gold objects were prestigious items, and archaeologists believe that those who owned them, or were buried with them, had a high status in society. Archaeologist George Eogan noted that gold reflected "ostentation in society, a society that has divisions along rank."

== Antiquarian and archaeological investigation ==
Archaeologist George Eogan, in his study of Bronze Age gold-working, noted that very few Bronze Age gold artefacts had been discovered through "controlled archaeological investigation", with the majority instead having been unearthed "by chance", as a result of "agricultural activities or peat-cutting". In the 21st century, metal detectorists have become important, for example with the important Shropshire bulla, found in 2018.

=== 17th, 18th and 19th centuries ===
Antiquarian interest in the gold artefacts of prehistory emerged in the British Isles during the Early Modern period. In 1696, the Ashmolean Museum in Oxford, southern England obtained the Ballyshannon Disk, the first such artefact of its type in their collection, although in ensuing centuries they would gain a number of other items to accompany it. The British Museum in London would follow suit almost a century later, gaining its first Bronze Age gold artefact, a disk from Kirk Andrews on the Isle of Man, in 1782.

=== 20th and 21st centuries ===
In 1980, Joan J. Taylor published the first comprehensive study of the available evidence, entitled Bronze Age Goldwork of the British Isles. In 1994, the archaeologist George Eogan published an academic monograph on the subject, entitled The Accomplished Art: Gold and Gold-Working in Britain and Ireland during the Bronze Age, which was brought out through the U.K.-based Oxbow Books. In it, Eogan noted that his study was "not a corpus or catalogue" of artefacts, instead being "an evaluation and interpretation of the material in social terms".

== Gallery ==
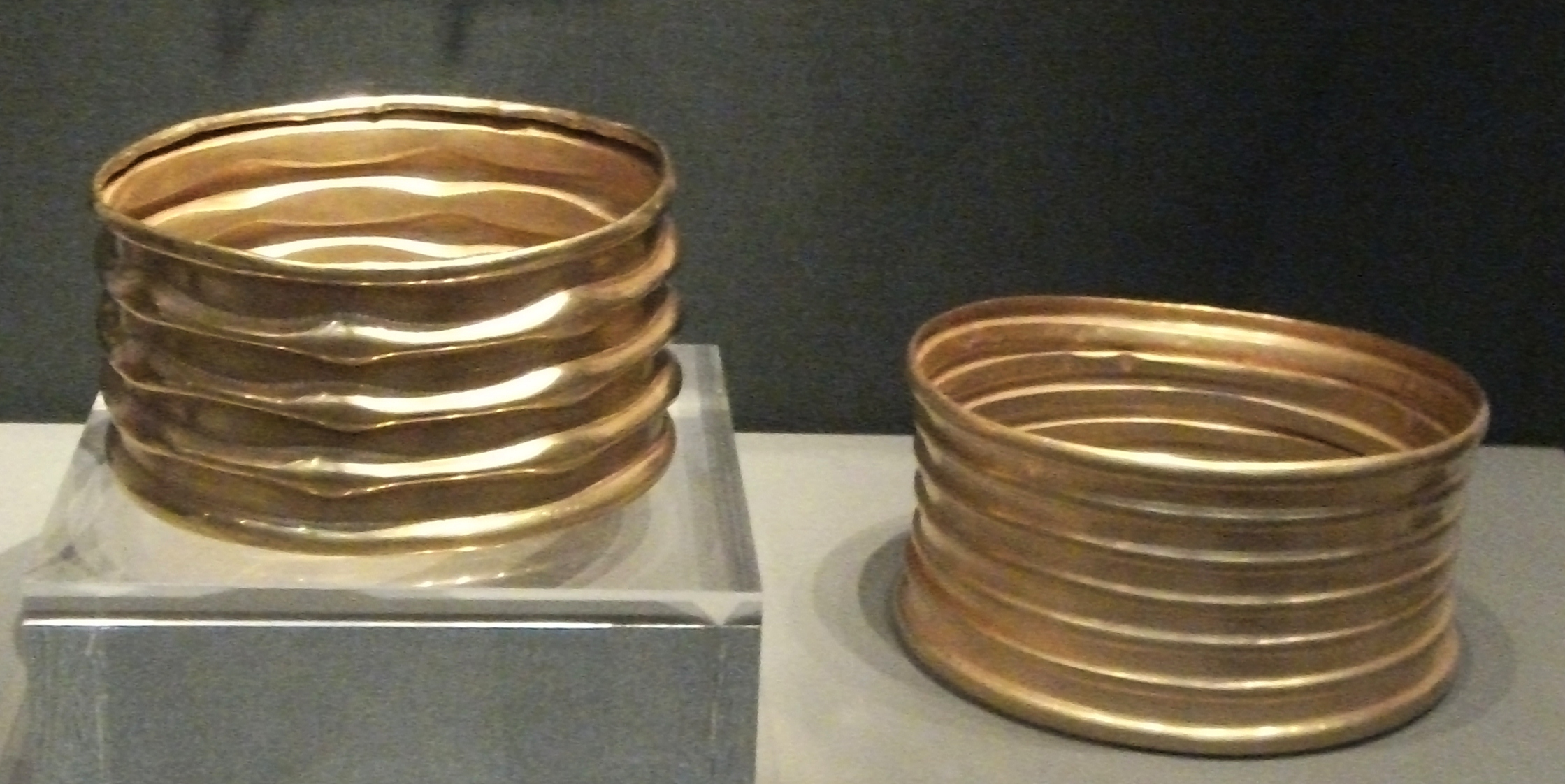
Bangles from Lockington, Leicestershire, (British Museum).

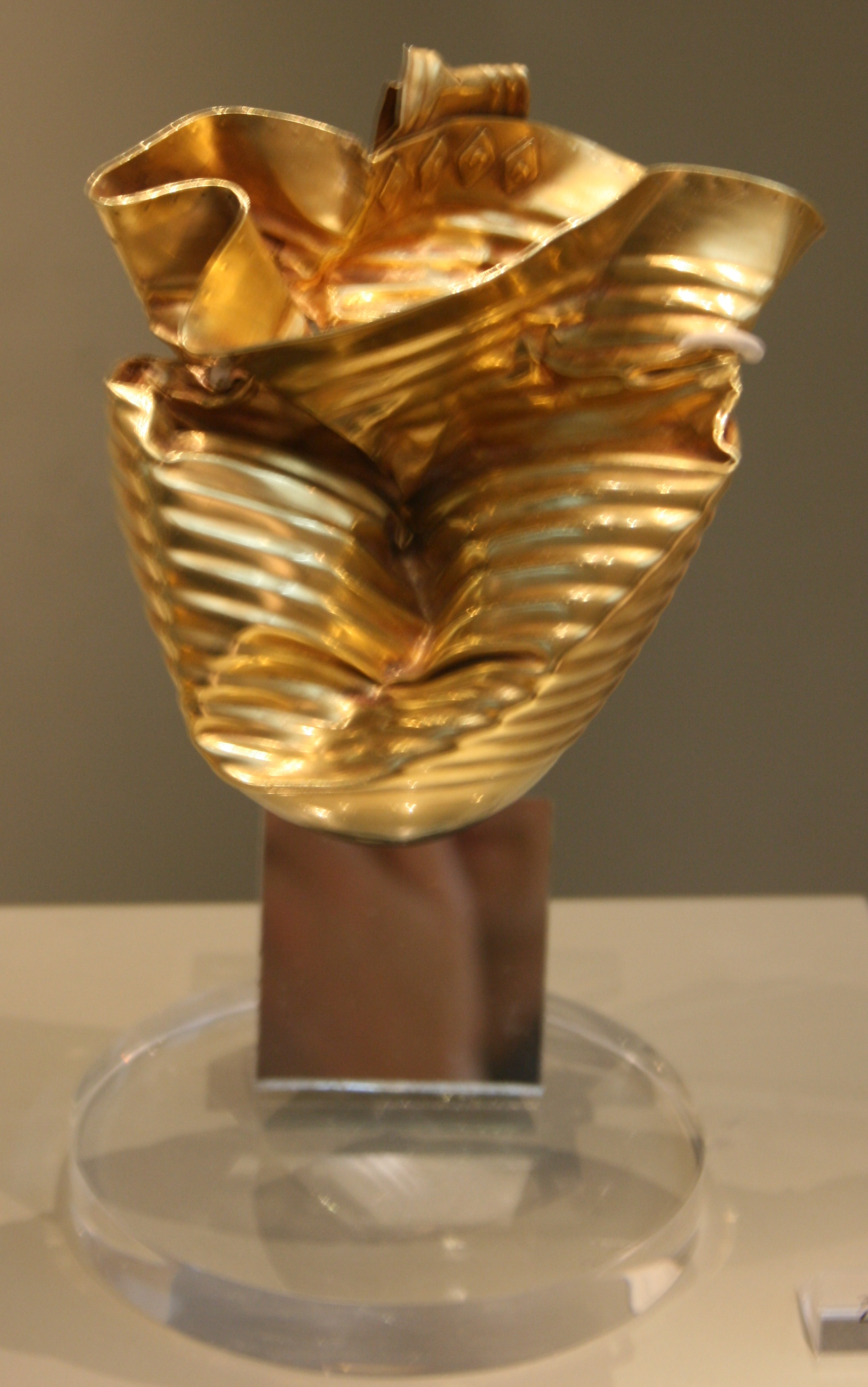
Ringlemere Cup in the British Museum.

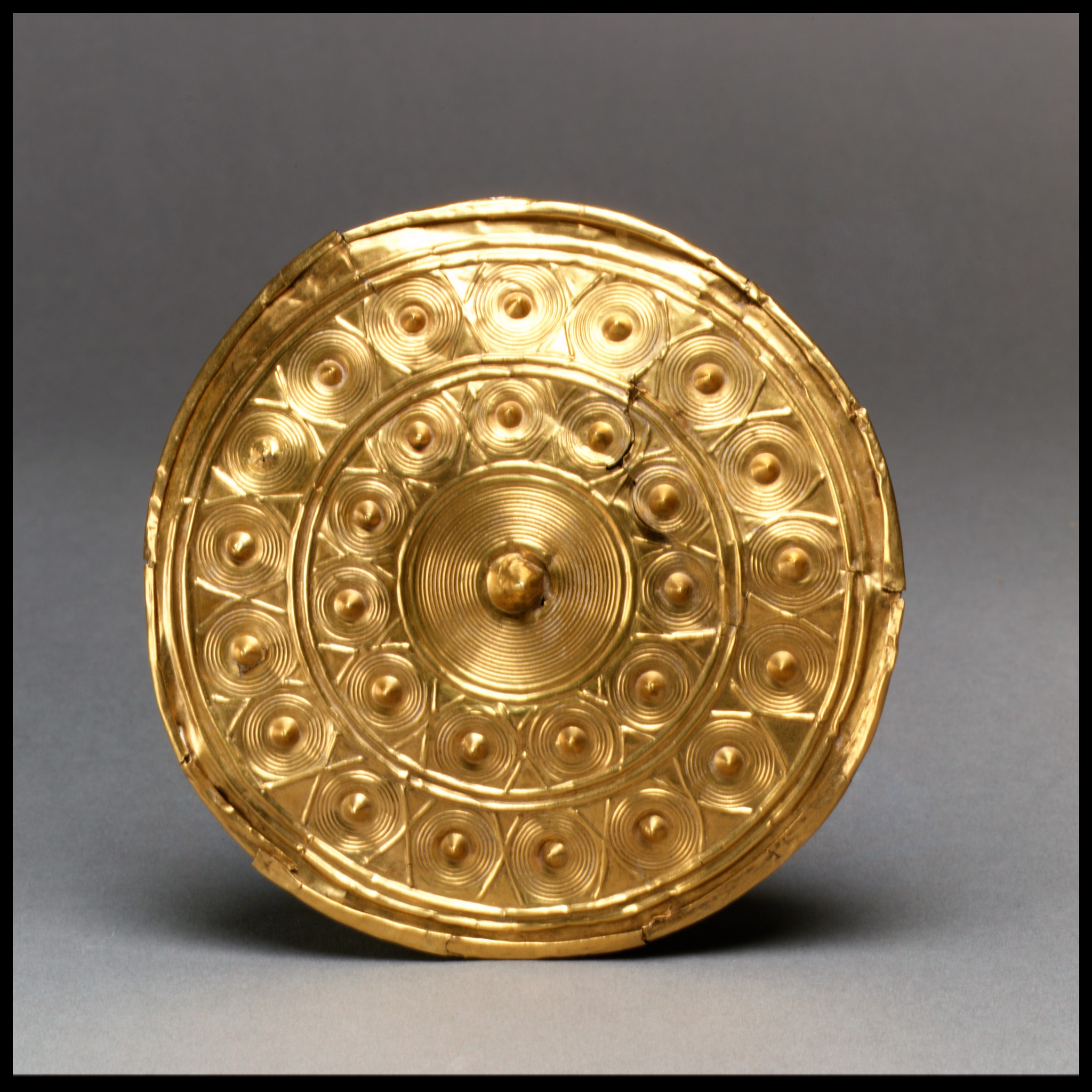
Gold disc, Ireland, c. 800 BC

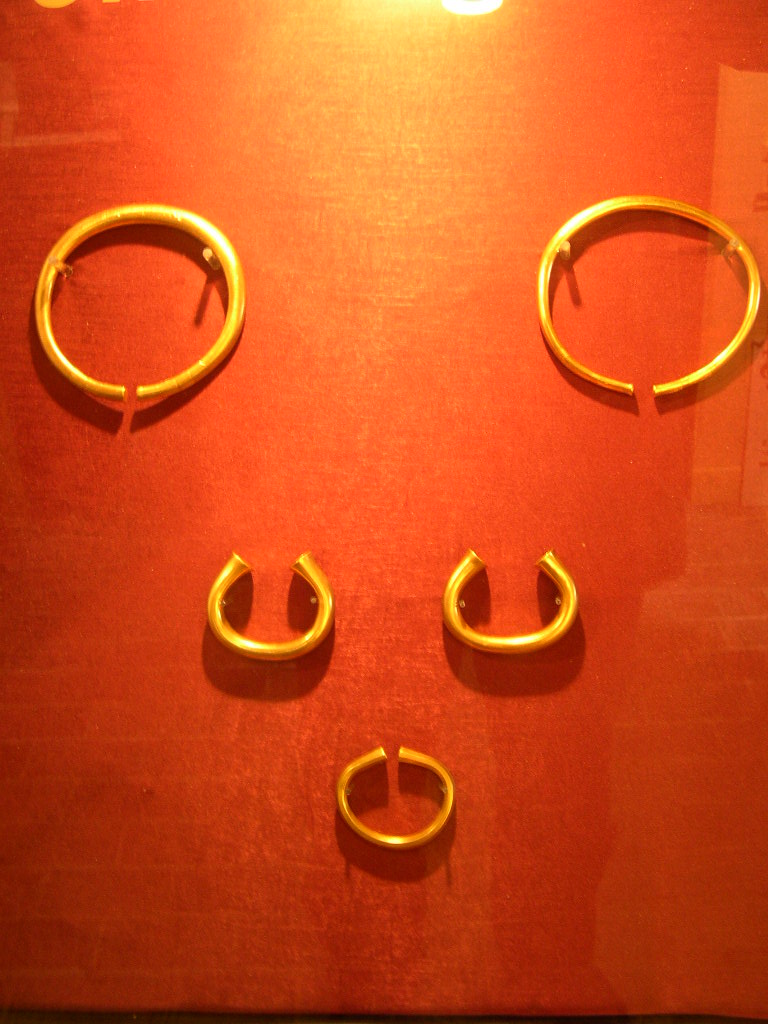
Reproductions of the Milton Keynes Hoard (originals in the BM).

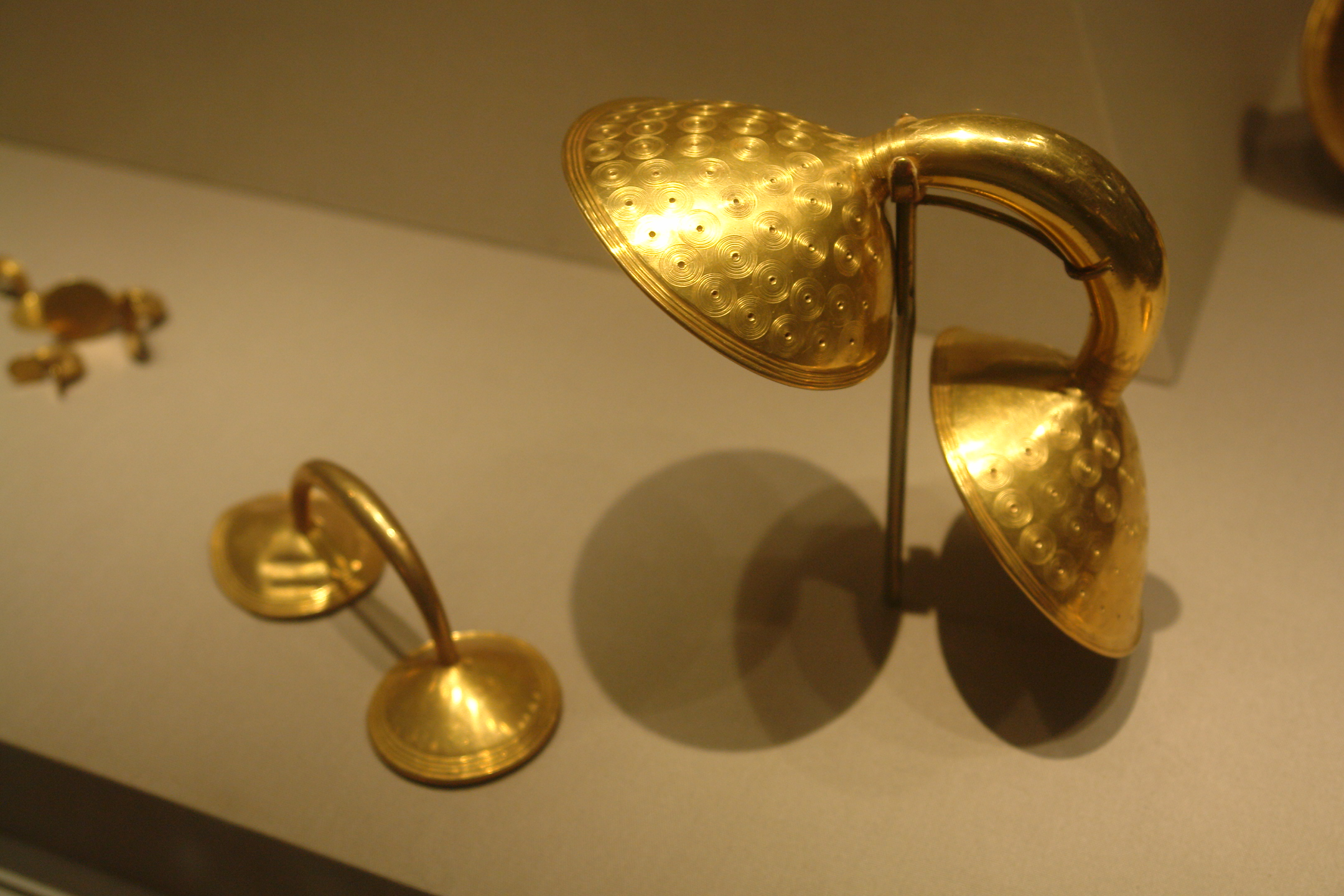
Dress Fastener, Clones, County Monaghan, 800-700 BC, NMI, Dublin

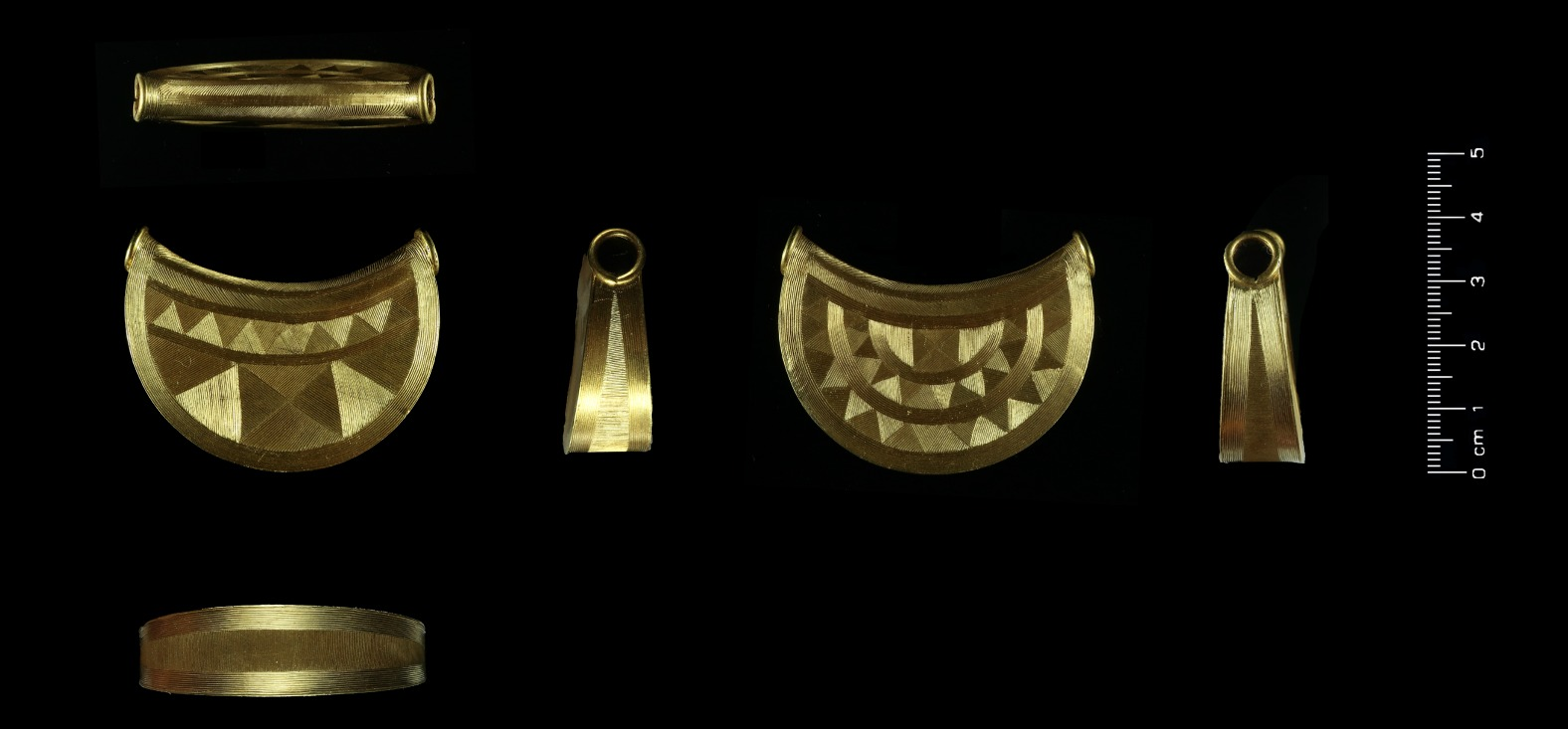
The Shropshire bulla, England, c. 1000 BC. Found in 2018

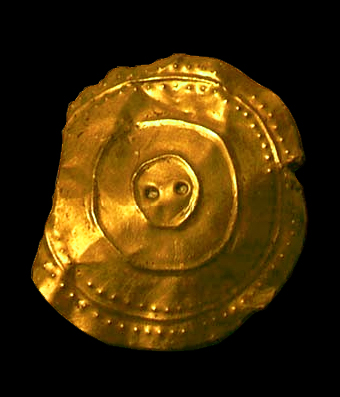
Banc Ty'nddôl sun-disc, Wales, c. 2450-2150 BC.

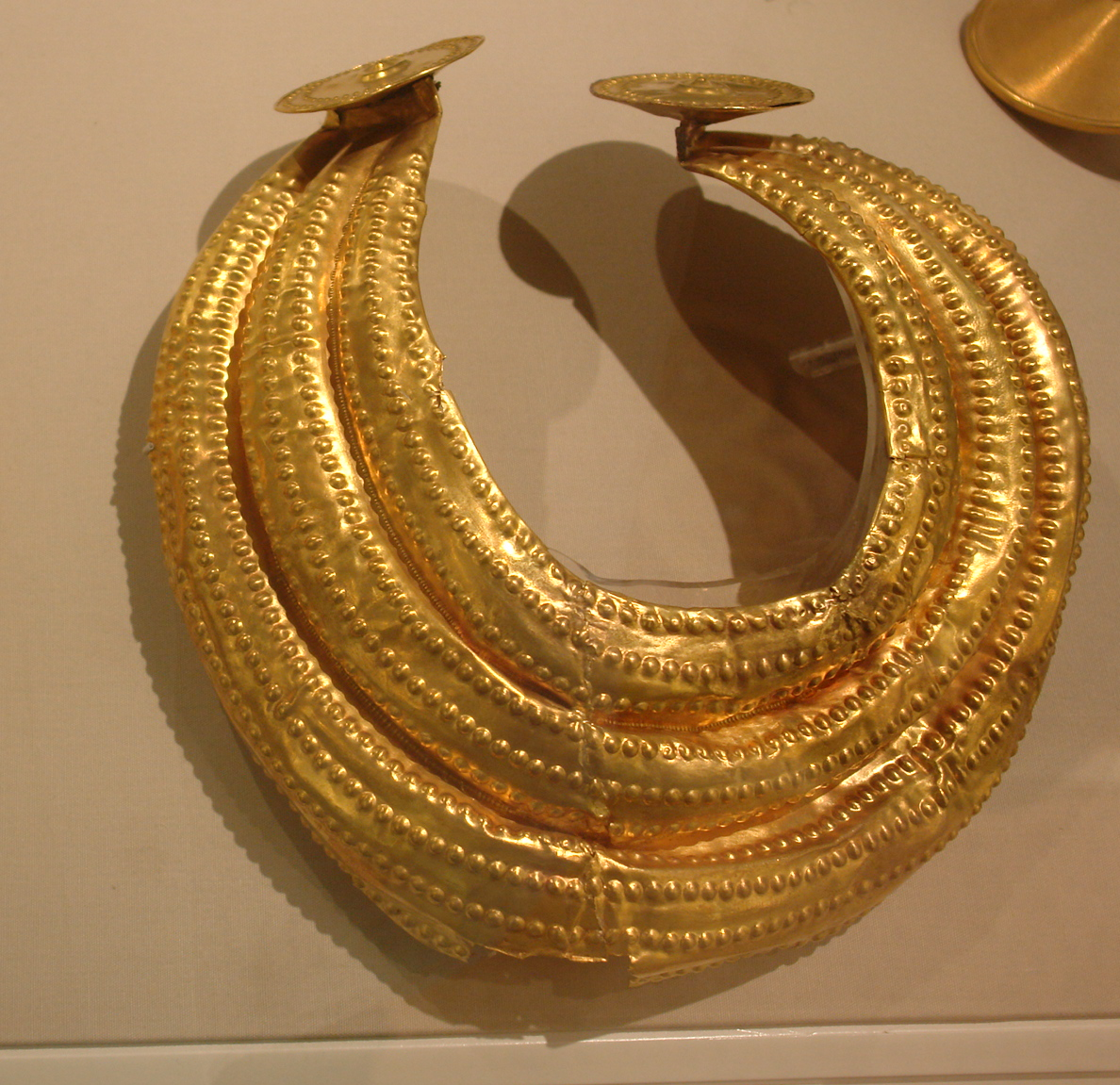
Irish gold "gorget", 800-700 BC, found Tonyhill, Co Clare. NMI, Dublin
