= Mary Evans (disambiguation) =

Mary Evans was the first love of Samuel Taylor Coleridge.

Mary Evans may also refer to:

- Mary Beth Evans (born 1961), American actress
- Mary Ann Evans (1819–1880), better known as George Eliot, writer
- Mary Ann Evans (actress) (1908–1996), known by her stage name Fearless Nadia, Australian–Indian actress
- Mary Anne Disraeli (born Mary Anne Evans; (1792–1872), wife of Disraeli
- Mary Evans (artist) (born 1963), British-Nigerian artist
- Mary Evans (basketball) American basketball coach
- Mary Evans (sect leader) (1735–1789), leader of a short-lived religious cult in Wales
- Mary Forbes Evans (1936–2010), British writer and collector
- Mary G. Evans (1891–1966), American Christian minister
- Mary Jane Evans (1888–1922), Welsh teacher, preacher and actress
- Mary Evans Thorne (c. 1740/1741 – after 1813), née Evans, one of the first women to have a leadership role in the Methodist movement in the United States
- Mary Evans Wilson (1866–1928), née Evans, civil rights activist in Boston, Massachusetts

== See also ==
- Evans (disambiguation)
