= Joan Taylor (disambiguation) =

Joan Taylor (1929–2012) was an American film and television actress.

Joan Taylor may also refer to (chronologically):

- Joan du Plat Taylor (1906–1983), British archaeologist
- Joan Kennedy Taylor (1926–2005), American journalist
- Joan J. Taylor (1940–2019), American archaeologist
- Joan E. Taylor (born 1958), British historian, Professor of Christian Origins and Second Temple Judaism
- Joan Taylor, recording engineer and producer, co-founder of Grosvenor Road Studios
