= Roger Edwards (Calvinist) =

Welsh newspaper editor (1811–1886)

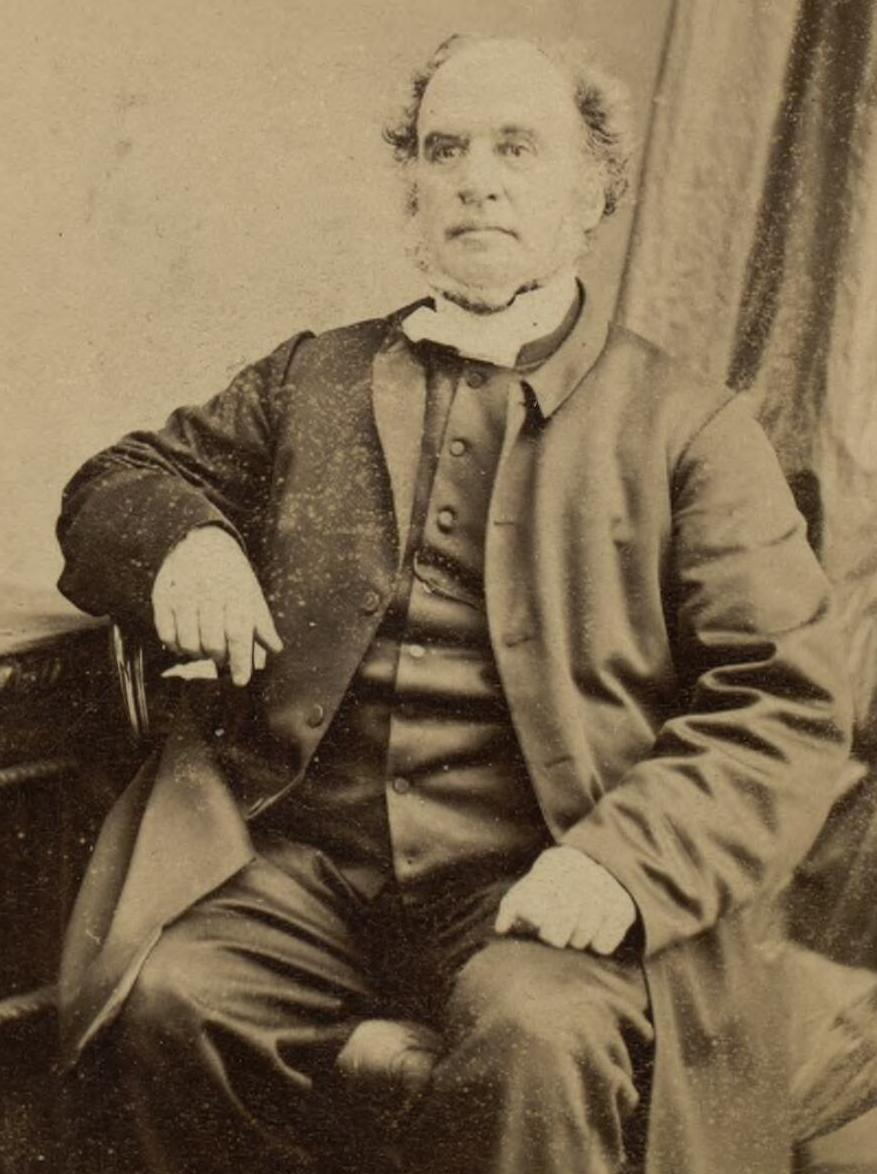
Roger Edwards

Roger Edwards D.D. (1811 – 9 July 1886) was a Welsh Calvinistic Methodist, who later became prominent in Wales as a press editor and publisher.

== Early life ==
Edwards was born in 1811, the year in which the Calvinistic Methodists first assumed the power to ordain their own ministers; and he grew up in Dolgellau amid the controversy over Calvin's five great points. Ebenezer Morris, John Elias, etc., were then leading lights in the denomination. In 1835 he became editor of Cronicl yr Oes, perhaps the first Welsh political paper. This he conducted for four years, writing most of it himself.

The leaders in the Chronicle for 1836 on the "House of Lords", "The Ballot" and "Church Rates" were strongly radical, and they brought on young Edwards the charge of socialism and sympathy with Tom Paine.

== Editing and publishing ==
From 1839 to 1874 Edwards was secretary of the Calvinistic Methodist Association. In January 1845 there appeared the first number of the Traethodydd, of which he was co-editor with his namesake Lewis Edwards until 1855, and after that with another until his death in 1886. He was editor of the Drysorfa (a magazine founded in 1779 by Thomas Charles of Bala from 1846 to 1886. Besides this he published two volumes of the Preacher, a hymn book called the Welsh Psalmist, Methodist Diary, James Hughes's Expositor, with additional notes, and three volumes of sermons by Henru Rees of Liverpool.

Edwards was the first to publish a serial story in Welsh; of these he wrote three.

== Influence ==
Although his own literary efforts are largely forgotten today, he was a key early influence on the novelist Daniel Owen, serving as a kind of mentor to the fatherless Owen and encouraging him to take up writing when illness had forced Owen to give up preaching. Owen's first two novels, Y Dreflan and Rhys Lewis, appeared in Y Drysorfa during Edwards' editorship.

== Works ==
- Y Tri Brawd a'u Teuluoedd (1866)
