= Y Tri Brawd a'u Teuluoedd =

1866 novel by Roger Edwards

Y Tri Brawd a'u Teuluoedd is a Welsh novel written in 1866 by the Calvinist Roger Edwards.

== Background ==
Y Tri Brawd a'u Teuluoedd was published as the first in a serial form of novels by Roger Edwards. Edwards was an ordained minister with the Calvinist Methodists; he was also a devoted editor and writer. As editor of Y Drysorfa Edwards’s aim was to allay Methodist suspicion of fictional literature and he became a large influence on Daniel Owen.
