= 1884 in Wales =

- Centuries: 17th; 18th; 19th; 20th; 21st
- Decades: 1860s; 1870s; 1880s; 1890s; 1900s
- See also: List of years in Wales; Timeline of Welsh history 1884 in The United Kingdom Scotland Elsewhere

This article is about the particular significance of the year 1884 to Wales and its people.

== Incumbents ==
- Archdruid of the National Eisteddfod of Wales – Clwydfardd
- Lord Lieutenant of Anglesey – William Owen Stanley
- Lord Lieutenant of Brecknockshire – Joseph Bailey, 1st Baron Glanusk
- Lord Lieutenant of Caernarvonshire – Edward Douglas-Pennant, 1st Baron Penrhyn
- Lord Lieutenant of Cardiganshire – Edward Pryse
- Lord Lieutenant of Carmarthenshire – John Campbell, 2nd Earl Cawdor
- Lord Lieutenant of Denbighshire – William Cornwallis-West
- Lord Lieutenant of Flintshire – Hugh Robert Hughes
- Lord Lieutenant of Glamorgan – Christopher Rice Mansel Talbot
- Lord Lieutenant of Merionethshire – Edward Lloyd-Mostyn, 2nd Baron Mostyn (until 17 March) Robert Davies Pryce (from 17 May)
- Lord Lieutenant of Monmouthshire – Henry Somerset, 8th Duke of Beaufort
- Lord Lieutenant of Montgomeryshire – Edward Herbert, 3rd Earl of Powis
- Lord Lieutenant of Pembrokeshire – William Edwardes, 4th Baron Kensington
- Lord Lieutenant of Radnorshire – Arthur Walsh, 2nd Baron Ormathwaite
- Bishop of Bangor – James Colquhoun Campbell
- Bishop of Llandaff – Richard Lewis (from 25 April)
- Bishop of St Asaph – Joshua Hughes
- Bishop of St Davids – Basil Jones

== Events ==
- 18 January – Physician William Price attempts to cremate his son, Iesu Grist (died 10 January aged 5 months), at Llantrisant. Later tried at Cardiff Assizes and acquitted on the grounds that cremation is not contrary to law, he is thus able to carry out the ceremony (the first in the U.K. in modern times) on 14 March.
- 27 January – 14 miners are killed in an accident at the Naval Colliery, Penygraig.
- 4 March – A Royal Commission on the Housing of the Working Classes is established. The Prince of Wales accepts nomination to the Commission and offends protocol by trying to have Octavia Hill included as a member.
- 18 October – Opening of the University College of North Wales, Bangor in the former Penrhyn Arms Hotel.
- 22 October – The Argentine Congress authorises the construction of the Central Chubut Railway by Lewis Jones y Cia.
- 8 November – 15 miners are killed in an accident at the Pochin Colliery, Tredegar.
- unknown dates
  - Isolation hospital for cholera patients opens on Flat Holm.
  - A Chair of Celtic Studies is founded at the University College of South Wales, Cardiff.
  - Closure of Talargoch lead mine, near Dyserth.
  - Slate industry in Wales: A flood at Dorothea quarry in the Nantlle Valley kills 7 and there is a major rockfall in the underground Cwmorthin quarry in the Blaenau Ffestiniog district.

== Arts and literature ==
=== Awards ===
National Eisteddfod of Wales – held at Liverpool

- Chair – Evan Rees ("Dyfed"), "Gwilym Hiraethog"
- Crown – Edward Foulkes

=== New books ===
- Amy Dillwyn – Jill
- Robert Owen – Institutes of Canon Law

=== Music ===
- Joseph Parry – Nebuchadnezzar (cantata)

== Sport ==
- Football – Oswestry win the Welsh Cup for the first time.
- Rugby union – The first international match is played at Cardiff Arms Park (between Wales and Ireland).

== Births ==
- 9 January – William Llewellyn Morgan, Wales international rugby union player (died 1960)
- 19 February – Clement Davies, politician, leader of the Liberal Party (UK) (died 1962)
- 6 April – J. G. Parry-Thomas, engineer and racing driver (died 1927)
- 7 April – C. H. Dodd, theologian (died 1973)
- 12 April – Tenby Davies, half-mile world champion runner (died 1932)
- 20 June – John Dyke, Wales international rugby union player (died 1960)
- 31 July – Lionel Rees, aviator, recipient of the Victoria Cross (died 1955)
- 15 August – Ivor Morgan, Wales international rugby union player (died 1943)
- 21 August – John Chandless, cricketer (died 1968)
- 24 November – Jack Jones, novelist (died 1970)
- 3 December – Bailey Davies, Wales international rugby union player (died 1968)
- 14 December – Margaret Davies, patron of the arts (died 1963)
- 15 December – Florrie Evans, revivalist and missionary (died 1967)
- date unknown – Thomas Jones, footballer (died 1958)

== Deaths ==
- 12 February – Henry Morgan-Clifford, politician, 77
- 17 March – Edward Lloyd-Mostyn, 2nd Baron Mostyn, 89
- 11 April – Thomas William Davids, nonconformist minister and ecclesiastical historian, 67
- 24 May – Henry Thomas Edwards, preacher, 46 (suicide)
- 17 July – Charles James Watkin Williams, judge, doctor and politician, 55
- 27 August – Dewi Havhesp, poet, 53
- 6 November – George Vane-Tempest, 5th Marquess of Londonderry, industrialist and owner of Plas Machynlleth, 63
- 16 December – John Davies, Congregational minister, writer, linguist and poet, 80
- 20 December – Philip Jacob, Archdeacon of Winchester, 80

== See also ==
- 1884 in Ireland
