= Mold gold cape =

Solid sheet-gold object from the British Bronze Age

Coordinates: 53.1671°N 3.1331°W

- Clogyn Aur yr Wyddrug (Welsh)
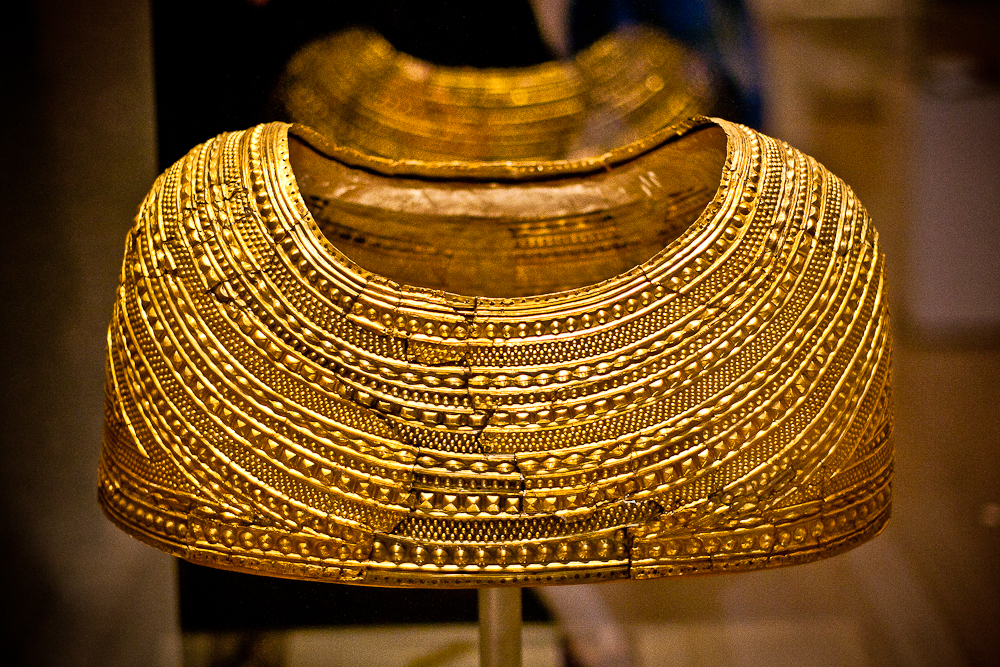
- The Mold gold cape in the British Museum
- Material: Gold
- Width: 45.8 cm
- Created: c. 1750 BC
- Discovered: 1833; Mold, Wales, United Kingdom
- Present location: British Museum, England, United Kingdom

The Mold gold cape (Welsh: Clogyn Aur yr Wyddgrug) is a ceremonial "cape" of solid sheet-gold from Wales dating from about 1900–1600 BC in the British Bronze Age. It was found at Bryn yr Ellyllon burial mound near Mold, Flintshire in 1833.

Discovered on a skeleton, the cape would have been impractical for everyday dress, and very restricting, and is thought to have formed part of a ceremonial or religious garment. The cape is usually on display in the British Museum in London, but has previously toured in exhibitions at Museum of Liverpool, National Museum Cardiff, and National Museum of Scotland.

== Discovery ==
The gold cape was found in 1833 by workmen. Accounts of the exact circumstances vary: either during the filling of a gravel pit or while they were quarrying for stone.

The cape was within a Bronze Age burial mound known as Bryn yr Ellyllon, which translates to "Goblins' Hill". The gold cape had been placed on the body of a person who was interred in a rough cist (stone-lined grave) within the mound. The preserved remains of the skeleton were fragmentary, and the cape was badly crushed. An estimated 200–300 amber beads, in rows, had originally been on the cape, but only a single bead survives today. Also associated with the cape were remains of coarse cloth and 16 fragments of sheet bronze which are likely to have been the backing for the gold: in places the gold was attached to the bronze sheeting with bronze rivets. Among the artefacts found there also were two gold 'straps'. An urn, with large quantities of burnt bone and ash, was found 60–90 cm (24–35 in) from the grave.

== The cape ==
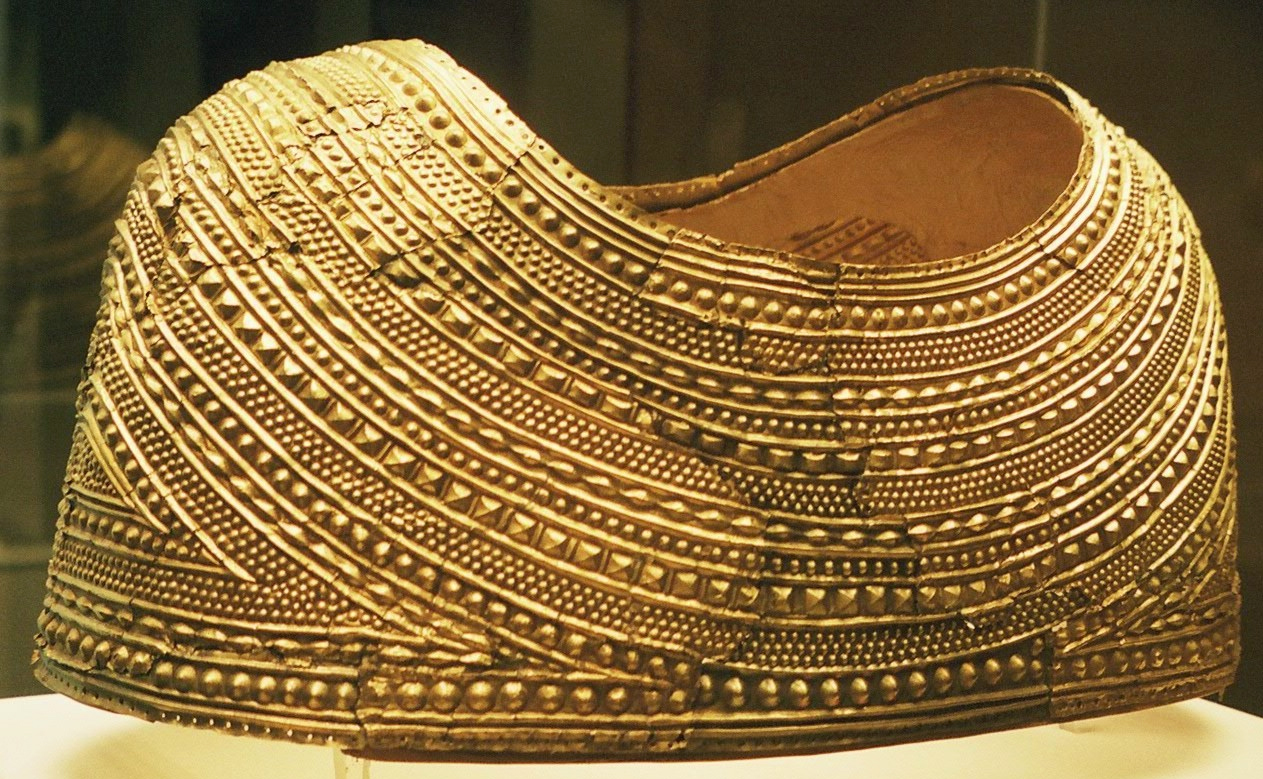
Mold gold cape, British Museum

The cape is 45.8 cm (18.0 in) wide. It was designed to fit someone of a very slight build, perhaps a teenager, and although the sex of the person buried in this grave remains unclear, the associated finds are likely, by comparison with similar contemporary graves discovered, to be those accompanying the burial of a woman. The cape shows signs of having been worn, and appears to have had a leather lining.

The cape is considered to be one of the most spectacular examples of prehistoric sheet-gold working yet discovered. It is of particular interest as both its form and its design are unparalleled. The cape is oval in shape and would cover the shoulders, upper arms, and upper chest of the person wearing it, being higher at the back and lower in the front. As the cape extends so far down the upper body, it would have severely restricted arm movement by pinning them to the wearer's side, so that only the lower arms were usable. For this reason, the cape would not have been suitable for everyday wear. It seems most probable that the cape was used for ceremonial purposes, and may have signified the wearer as a person of spiritual or temporal power: the Bronze Age equivalent of a chasuble, perhaps.

The craftsmanship with which the cape was constructed is exceptional. The object was beaten out of a single ingot of gold, a task which would have taken considerable time and skill, and was then intensely decorated with repoussé concentric rings of ribs and bosses. The decoration almost totally fills the object's outer surface, so that very little "plain" gold remains. It has been suggested that this decorative motif may mimic multiple strings of beads and/or the folds of cloth.

The value of the metal and the quality of the craftmanship suggests that the cape was produced by a wealthy culture. Scholars speculate that the makers and owners of the cape were associated with the mine on the Great Orme, north Wales, the largest copper mine in north-west Europe at that time.

=== The decorative motifs ===
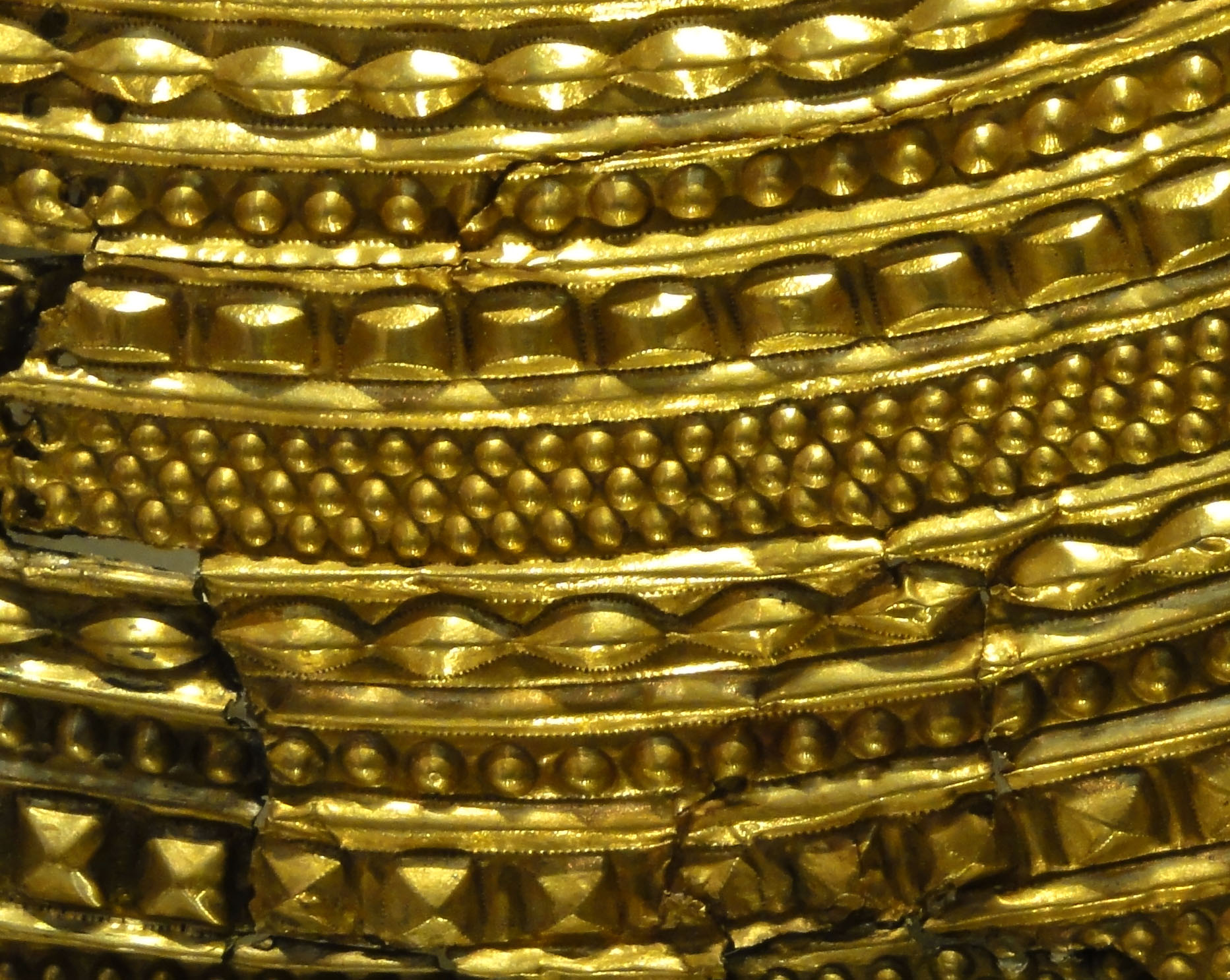
Detailed image showing decoration bands and tool marks

Around the neck and base is a line of perforations. There are three zones of decoration on the cape: a band running around the base, a curving panel that dips at the neck and rises over the shoulders, and two matching panels to fill in the upper arm area. Above the perforations at the base are two high ridges and a deep groove. Above the groove is a line of conical bosses that run around the whole cape, but bifurcate at the front to rise up over the triangular panels at the upper arm. The bosses at the front are enlarged.

At the front the sequence of decoration above the bosses is, from bottom to top: ridge, three rows of small domed bosses, ridge, row of square-based pyramids, ridge, row of small domed bosses, ridge, row of lentoid bosses, ridge, three rows of small domed bosses, ridge, row of conical bosses and finally, three ridges.

The back has the same sequence with the addition, from bottom to top, of ridge, row of lentoid bosses, ridge, three rows of small domed bosses, ridge and, a row of lentoid bosses.

The two triangular areas on the upper arm are bounded at the front by a ridge, row of lentoid bosses and a ridge. At the front and back it is then bounded by three rows of small domed bosses. Inside this is a ridge, a row of conical bosses, and two ridges with a groove. The central area is filled with small domed bosses. At the base of each ridge and the large bosses are fine punched indentations (pointillé). In places the perforations at the base are double. In areas where parts of the cape are missing there are perforations (possibly from a previous repair).

Perforations along the upper and lower edges may indicate that it was once attached to a lining, perhaps of leather, which has decayed. The bronze strips may have served to strengthen the adornment further.

== Parallels ==
The Mold cape is the only other piece of Bronze Age goldwork that challenges bronze age Wessex gold material in its richness; however, the decorative motifs employed in the cape are dissimilar to those found in Wessex artefacts.

The Mold cape shows both indigenous and Continental influences. Similar treatment of decorative motifs may be found in other pieces of Bronze Age metalwork, such as a bowl found at Rongères in eastern France (which itself draws from Central European sources), and also with the lenticular bosses found on the Migdale (Sutherland, Scotland) bronze "spacer-plate" (a device to hold apart the separate strands of a necklace) and the bronze armlets found at Melfort in Argyll, Scotland. This distinctive boss motif, surrounded by fine dots outlining the lenticular shape, has a long duration in Scotland and obviously survived in the indigenous repertoire to reappear on this unusual cape.

With its fine repoussé work, the mold cape represents the last major piece of second millennium BC sheetwork so far discovered. Thereafter, the dominant preference for sheetwork in the British Isles is eclipsed and the evidence is more of massive goldwork in the form of solid bracelets, twisted bar-flanged torcs, and solid rings.

== Excavation and display ==
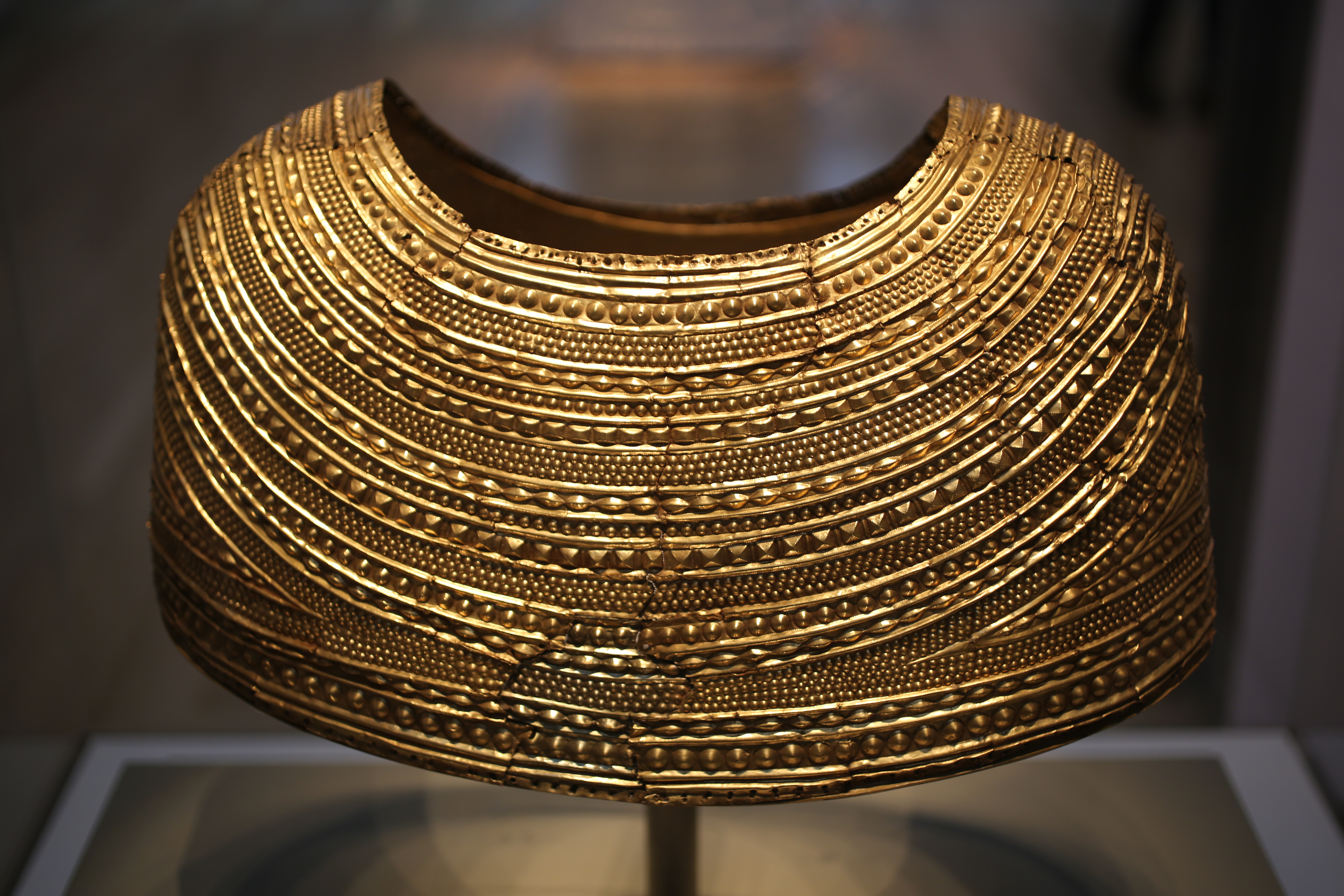
The Mold Cape, back view

Since its backing had decayed, the fragile cape broke up during recovery. The pieces were dispersed among various people. Although the British Museum acquired the greater proportion in 1836, small fragments have come to light intermittently over the years and have been reunited with the larger portion. Small fragments of the actual cape are on permanent display in the Daniel Owen Centre's museum in Mold.

Later, detailed study and restoration revealed the full form of the cape, which at one time had been misidentified as a peytrel (chest ornament) for a horse. It also became apparent that a second, smaller object, in matching embossed style, was present in the grave. The cape is now mounted on cloth.

The cape was number 6 in the list of British archaeological finds selected by experts at the British Museum for the 2003 BBC Television documentary Our Top Ten Treasures presented by Adam Hart-Davis. It also featured in the BBC Radio 4 series A History of the World in 100 Objects, as object number 19, in February 2010.

The cape was on display at the National Museum of Wales, Cardiff until 4 August 2013, but was transferred to Wrexham for the period 7 August to 14 September 2013.

== Proposed repatriation to Wales ==
There have been calls from various local politicians to repatriate the artefact to a museum in Wales, although in 2011, it was stated repatriation of artefacts was not part of the current Welsh Government strategy.

In 2002, Alison Halford, Welsh Assembly Member for Delyn, called for the British Museum to return the artefact to a north Wales museum. The artefact is said to be held in London over security concerns at north Wales museums, with Halford stating if there were "such a museum [in north Wales] we would be able to make a legitimate claim for [its] return". In 2011, the Celtic League and Plaid Cymru's Westminster leader Elfyn Llwyd backed similar calls. With Llwyd stating it should be returned as it is part of the Welsh "collective memory".

In 2013, the cape was temporarily returned to Wales on loan, with a local tourism chair expressing his disappointment at being unable to have it permanently return and hope that a new local museum could house it in the future. In 2018, Delyn AM Hannah Blythyn repeated calls for its return, raising the matter in the Welsh Assembly and with the First Minister. In the same year, Denbighshire councillor Mabon Gwynfor, tweeted for the cape to be returned to Wales. In 2022, the academic and former librarian of the National Library of Wales Andrew Green called for the British Museum to return artefacts, including the cape to Wales.

== In popular culture ==
The cape is referenced in the bluegrass song, "King of Boys", by Steve Martin and Edie Brickell.

== See also ==
- Archaeology of Wales

== British Museum registration numbers ==
- 1836,0902.1
- 1856,1014.1
- 1857,1216.1
- 1877,0507.1
- 1881,0514.1
- 1881,0516.1
- 1881,0516.2
- 1883,1207.1
- 1927,0406.1
- 1972,0601.1
- 1972,0601.2
- 1972,0601.3
- 1972,0601.4

== See also ==
- Golden hat
- Nebra skydisk
- Shropshire bulla
- Berliner Goldhut

== Bibliography ==
- Clarke, D. V.; Cowie, Trevor G.; Foxon, Andrew; Barrett, John C. (1985), Symbols of Power at the Time of Stonehenge, National Museum of Antiquities of Scotland, ISBN 978-0-11-492455-3
- Gage, J., 1836 "A letter from John Gage, esq, FRS, Director, to Sir Henry Ellis, KH, FRS, Secretary, accompanying a gold British corselet exhibited to the Society, and since purchased by the Trustees of the British Museum" Archaeologia 26, 422–31
- Powell, T. G. E., 1953 "The gold ornament from Mold, Flintshire, North Wales" Proceedings of the Prehistoric Society 19, 161–79
- Taylor, Joan J. (1980), Bronze Age Goldwork of the British Isles, Gulbenkian archaeological series, Cambridge, ISBN 978-0-521-20802-4

Preceded by 18: Minoan Bull-leaper	A History of the World in 100 Objects; Object 19	Succeeded by 20: Statue of Ramesses II
