= Shropshire bulla =

Late Bronze Age gold pendant discovered in 2018

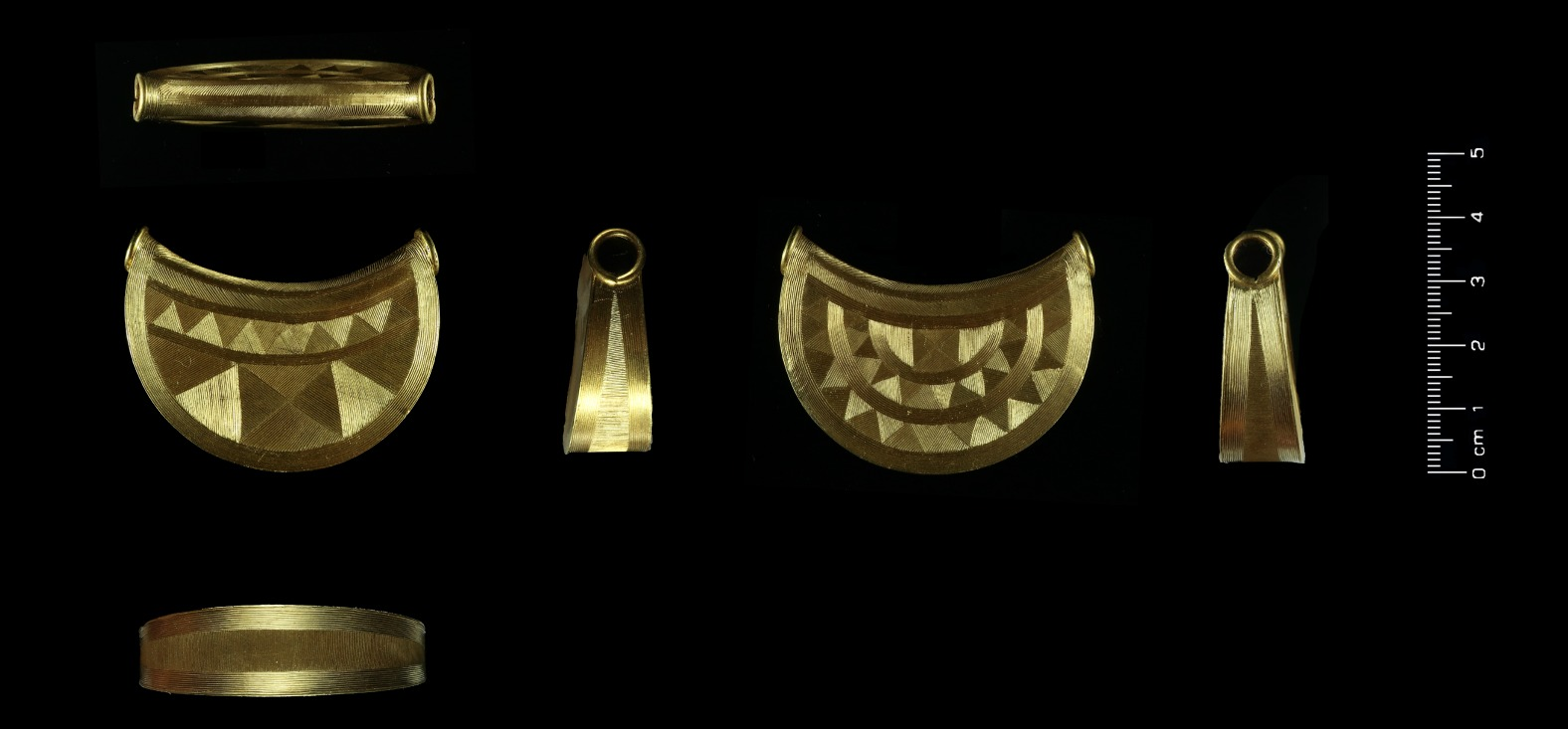
- Shropshire bulla, different views
- Type: Bulla
- Material: Gold, silver, copper
- Size: Height: 36 mm, width: 47.4mm
- Created: 1000 BC – 800 BC
- Period/culture: Late Bronze Age
- Discovered: 12 May 2018; Shropshire, England
- Present location: British Museum

The Shropshire bulla ("bulla" is Medieval Latin for "a round seal", Classical Latin for "bubble, blob", plural bullae), also known as the Shropshire sun pendant, is a Late Bronze Age gold pendant found by a metal detectorist in 2018 in Shropshire, England. Made primarily of gold, it is the eighth bulla discovered to date in Great Britain and Ireland, and only the second in Britain. The pendant, decorated with intricately carved geometric designs, is now in the British Museum in London.

According to the Portable Antiquities Scheme, "The workmanship of the construction and decoration of the 'Shropshire Marches' bulla represents the highest skill and expertise seen within decorated metalwork of the period being almost un-paralleled within a British context."

The findspot has been kept secret, called only the "Shropshire Marches", that is to say the west side of Shropshire, forming part of the Welsh Marches along the border with Wales.

== Description ==
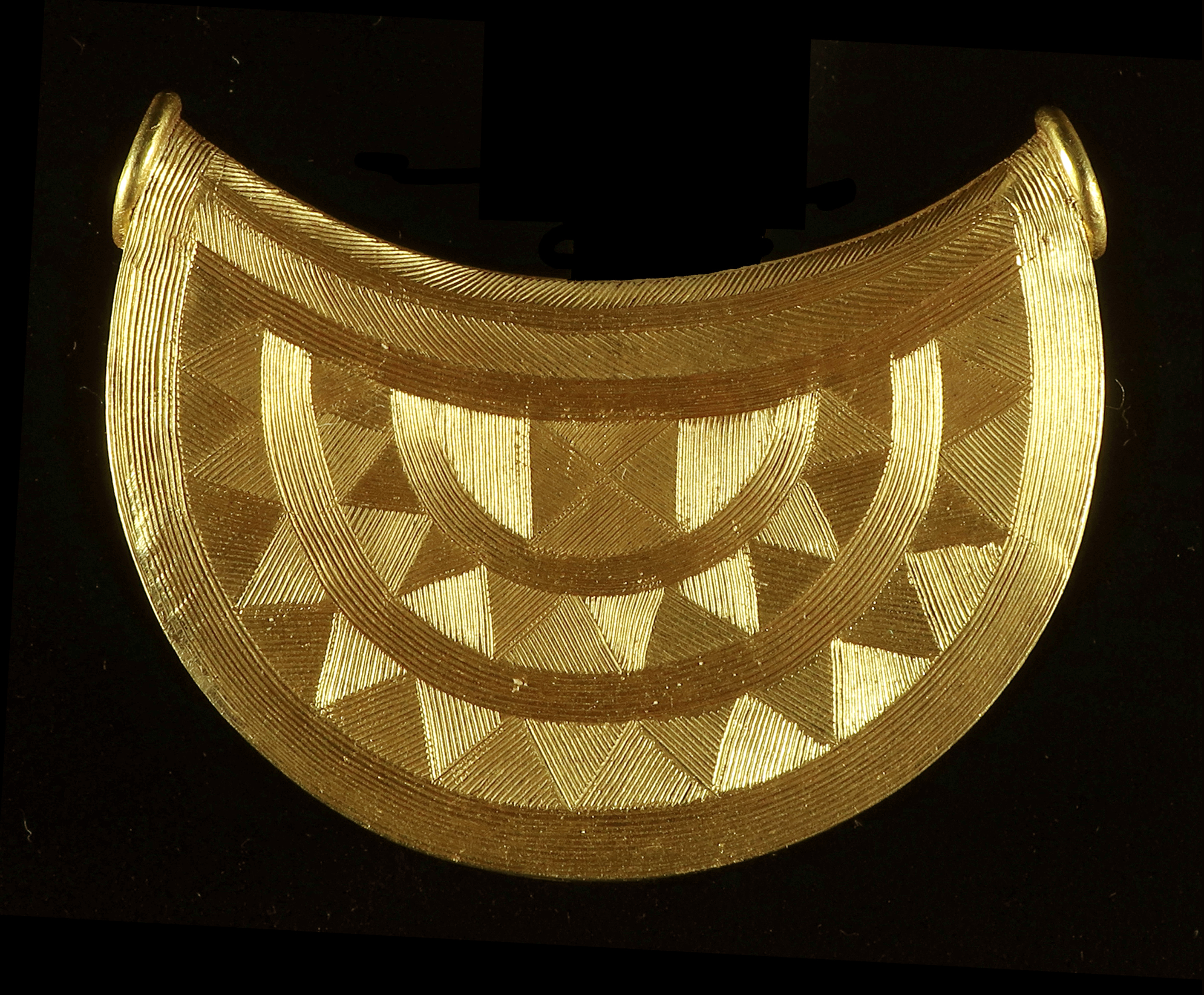
The Shropshire bulla

The Shropshire bulla is a D-shaped hollow object created from pieces of gold sheet metal by a highly skilled craftsman. Named after amulets worn in Roman Europe, bullae were most likely worn as pendants. The Shropshire bulla is an example of "reversible fashion"; the front and back are alike in design, either side can be selected to be the presenting face. Bullae were probably highly prized adornments, worn as clothing accessories to display the wearer's high status and wealth.

The Shropshire pendant is decorated with an intricately carved geometric design, embellished with tiny triangles consisting of evenly spaced diagonal lines. Analysis of the bulla reveals that the surface is composed of 79—81% gold, 14—16% silver with the remaining being copper. The dimensions of the object are: width, 47.4 mm (1.87 in); height, 36.7 mm (1.44 in); and weight, 26.6 g (0.94 oz);

== History ==
In May 2018, the Shropshire Finds Liaison Officer, Peter Reavill, received a phone call from a metal detectorist who had made a spectacular find. The names of the landowner and metal detectorist, and the location, were not revealed, in order to protect the findspot and potential archaeological artefacts. In viewing photographs of the intricately carved gold pendant, Reavill's first thought was that the pendant was the missing Irwell bulla, which had been found in the Manchester Ship Canal in 1772. That bulla was eventually sold at auction in 1806 and has since disappeared. After further evaluation, Reavell concluded that the new find was not the missing bulla.

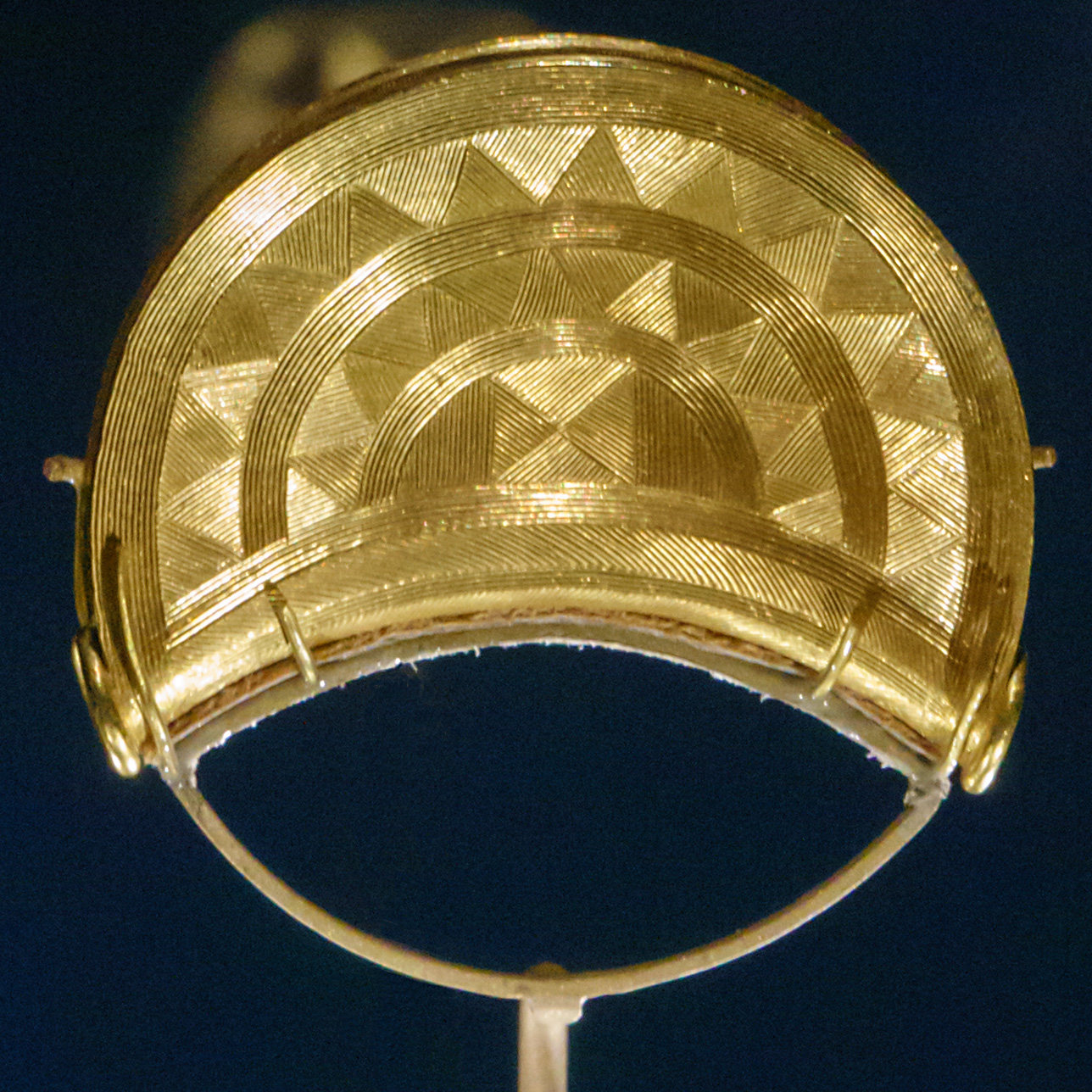
The Shropshire Bulla on display at 'The World of Stonehenge' exhibition, British Museum, 2022

The Shropshire bulla is only the second bulla to be discovered in England and the eighth bulla found to date in Britain and Ireland. This artefact is the most south-westerly example of high-quality Late British Bronze Age gold metalwork production and deposition. The find indicates the existence of rich mineral deposits in this region of Britain. The pendant has been described by the British Museum as "one of the most significant pieces of Bronze Age gold metalwork" ever discovered in Britain.

The British Museum acquired the bulla in 2020 for £250,000 with help from Art Fund and the American Friends of the British Museum. In 2021 it was on display at the Shrewsbury Museum & Art Gallery, loaned as part of the British Museum's National Programmes. In December it moved to the British Museum to be displayed with other Bronze Age objects such as the Mold Gold Cape.

In 2021, a short animated film inspired by the detectorist's discovery and artefact's history called Treasure was commissioned by Shrewsbury Museum and Art Gallery and produced and created by Samantha Moore.

== See also ==
- Torc
- Gold lunula
- Gold working in the Bronze Age British Isles
