= Enoc Huws =

1891 novel by Daniel Owen

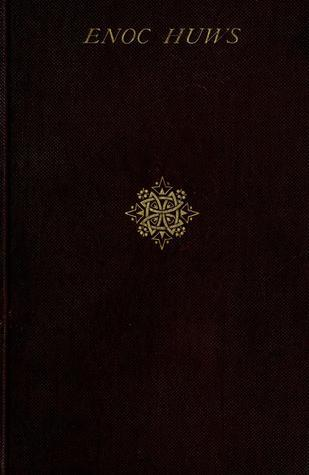
- Author: Daniel Owen
- Language: Welsh language
- Publication date: 1891
- Publication place: Wales

Enoc Huws is a classic novel by Daniel Owen, written in the Welsh language and first published in 1891. It was serialised in Y Cymro prior to publication in book form. It has been adapted for stage and television (in an early 1974 TV adaptation, and later as Y Dreflan on S4C).

== Plot summary ==
The story is a social comedy and concerns the activities of the villainous Captain Trefor, a con artist who convinces investors to speculate on lead mining schemes and pays himself a generous salary from the proceeds. After being abandoned by most of his previous investors, Trefor sets his sights on the naïve but successful shopkeeper Enoc Huws, who is in love with Trefor's daughter, Susan, and sees investing in Trefor's scheme as an opportunity to get close to her.

Sub-plots follow Enoc as he fights off the unwanted affection of his housekeeper, and a group of chapel elders wishing to appoint a new minister. The novel is set in the same nameless town as Owen's earlier novel Rhys Lewis, and features a few of the same characters, though it is not in any real sense a sequel.
