= William John Edwards =

William John Edwards (6 October 1898 – 11 January 1978) was a leading exponent and teacher of the Welsh singing medium of Cerdd Dant (Free verse singing). Cerdd Dant is sung to a particular tune selected for the verse and the singer is accompanied by a harpist playing a different but complementary melody. It is a major feature of all Eisteddfod festivals.

Edwards was born the eldest son and second child of William Charles and Jane Edwards on a farm named Pentre Draw in Pentrellyncymer, Denbighshire. His early life was shaped by the death of his father in 1911 from appendicitis and he was forced to leave school to run the farm. Despite this setback he continued his father's interest in folk song and Welsh literature. His greatest contribution was as a teacher and mentor to local singers who were looking to improve their ability. Several of these achieved success at Eisteddfodau.
