= Mary Jane Evans =

Mary Jane Evans (3 February 1888 – 25 February 1922) was a Welsh teacher, preacher and actress, best known for her solo recitations and dramatic monologues.

== Biography ==
She was born Mary Jane Francis at Godre'r Graig. Her mother was Mary Ann Francis (née Hutchings) and her father, Charles Francis, was the conductor of Ystalyfera's town band. As a girl, she won many competitions for recitation at local eisteddfodau, sometimes using the pseudonym "Llaethferch" ("milkmaid") because she delivered milk in her home district. She was sent to a private college in Carmarthen, run by Joseph Harry. After school she did some teaching, and was sent for a time to the Royal Academy of Music in order to improve her command of the English language, which was little used in her day-to-day life in Wales.

She married a musician, William David Evans, in 1919, and they made their home at Maerdy in the Rhondda valley. Later in life she became an adjudicator at the National Eisteddfod. Her hectic schedule of personal appearances placed a strain on her fragile health, and she died at the age of 34. Her body was returned to Godre'r Graig for burial. A memoir of Mary Jane Evans, titled Llaethferch. Er Cof (in Welsh) was edited by Ben Davies, who had been the minister at her chapel, and was published at Ystalyfera in 1923.
