= Ben Davies (poet) =

Welsh poet

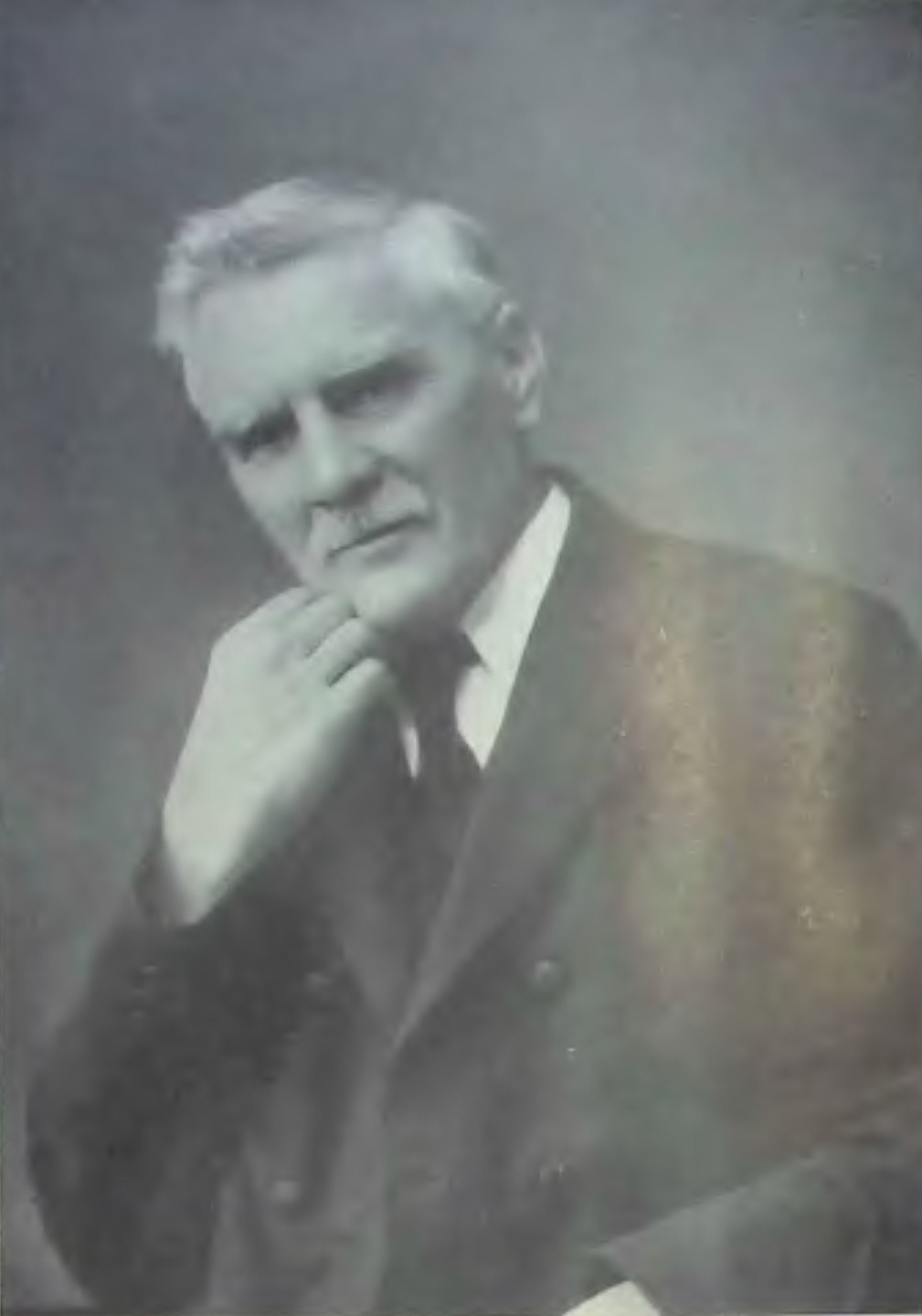
Ben Davies

Ben Davies (1864–1937) was a Welsh poet and an Independent minister.

== Biography ==
He grew up in Dolgam, a farm where he received some early education at the local school. At the age of 13 however he entered employment as a miner in a local coal mine.

He began writing poetry at quite a young age, and was awarded prizes at various local literary competitions and Eisteddfodau. At 21 he won the bardic chair at the Tredegar Eisteddfod for his awdl on "Virtue" (Rhinwedd). He was also competent at the art of composing cynghanedd.

From 1886 to 1888 he studied at Bala Independent College, before becoming minister of Bwlchgwyn and Llandegla (1888–1891), and then Pant Teg, Ystalyfera (1891–1926). One of his congregation at Ystalyfera was Mary Jane Evans, of whom he later edited a memoir.

He continued his Eisteddfod successes, often winning the chief prizes. In 1896 he published a volume of lyrics, Caneuon Bywyd. He also frequently gave lectures on Welsh literary personalities.

He spent his later years living in London with his children, and died there on 2 January 1937.
