= Mary Evans Thorne =

American Methodist laywoman

Personal life
- Born: 1740/1741
- Died: after 1813
- Spouse: Samuel Parker

Religious life
- Religion: Christianity
- Denomination: Methodist

Mary Evans Thorne (c. 1740/1741 – after 1813) was one of the first women to have a leadership role in the Methodist movement in the United States. She was appointed class leader, a layperson who performed pastoral duties, by Joseph Pilmore in Philadelphia in about 1770.

== Biography ==
Mary Evans was born around 1740–1741 (Note: Evans stated she was 23 when she joined the Baptists and joined the Methodists 7 years later. In her 1813 letter, she stated she had been a Methodist for 43 years. Thus derived birth would be in 1740. Footnote 7 (pg 66) says Thorne was about 72 when she wrote the 1813 letter Leading to a derived birth of 1741.) in Bristol, Bucks County, Pennsylvania to Thomas and Diana Evans. Her parents, who were of Welsh heritage, moved to New Bern, North Carolina, where Thomas died. Her mother remarried James Mills in 1767. Evans joined the Baptists in North Carolina when she was 23 and married James Thorne, but he died in 1762. After his death, she relocated with her mother to Philadelphia. New to the city, she sought a place of worship found a Methodist service conducted by Joseph Pilmoor, which was more to her liking than the Baptist faith. Around the age of 30, she joined the Methodist church, against the wishes of her mother. The mother and her husband returned to North Carolina cutting off all contact with Thorne. Within 2 years of her conversion, according to a letter from Thorne, she had three classes and two Methodist bands meeting weekly under her tutelage. She was the first woman class-leader of Philadelphia, having been appointed to lead a class of women by Pilmore and she may have been the first woman in the American Colonies to hold the position. Another letter, dated 7 February 1770 from Richard Boardman, confirmed that she had two classes in her charge. Class leaders in this era were spiritual laity, who were accountable for the pastoral needs of their class members. Thorne supported herself by teaching and taking in sewing and visited hospitals tending to and praying for the sick and dying. Her devotion continued even after the British took over the Methodist Chapel, as she then held services in her home at the early part of the Revolutionary War.

Around this same time, she met Captain Samuel Parker, a ship captain from England, who was entrusted with taking some of the injured soldiers back to Britain. They were married on 12 February 1778 at St. Paul's Church and she returned with him to England, leaving from the Delaware Bay on 17 March 1778 and arriving in Cork on 15 April 1778. Her husband served as a steward in London and she served as a class leader and later when they were living in Scarborough, North Yorkshire, they held the same positions. After they moved to Newby, near Scarborough, her husband's ship was lost and the couple became impoverished. According to letters from Thomas Rankin, their distress occurred by 1798. Parker died in England after 1813 and later, she and Parker's son moved to Philadelphia.

== Bibliography ==
- Lednum, John (1859). A History of the Rise of Methodism in America. pp. 42–43. ISBN 9781429019811.
- Lybrand, George (November 1, 1884). "Mary Thorn: First Female Class Leader in American Methodism" (PDF). Philadelphia Methodist: 61.
- Matthews, Rex D. (2007). Timetables of History for Students of Methodism. Nashville, Tennessee: Abingdon Press. ISBN 978-1-4267-6459-2.
- Richey, Russell E.; Rowe, Kenneth E.; Schmidt, Jeanne Miller (2010). The Methodist Experience in America. Nashville: Abingdon Press. ISBN 978-1-4267-1937-0.
