= Huw Menai =

Huw Owen Williams (13 July 1886 – 28 June 1961), who wrote as Huw Menai, was a Welsh poet, a Welsh-language speaker who nevertheless wrote only in the English language. His poems were among the first classic works to be republished as a result of a 2004 incentive on the part of the Welsh Assembly Government.

== Biography ==
Huw Menai was born in Caernarfon; although his birth certificate says his parents were William and Elizabeth Williams, it has been suggested that his natural father may have been another man named Hugh Owen. He was educated at the Ragged School in Caernarfon, and left school aged twelve, later becoming a miner at Gilfach Goch. He married Anne Jones in 1910; they had three sons and five daughters.

Having moved to Merthyr Vale, where his father was working, he became politically active and wrote for socialist publications, until promotion forced him to take the employer's side. During the First World War, he began writing poetry and contributing to mainstream newspapers such as the Western Mail. His friends and correspondents included Wil Ifan, John Cowper Powys, and Raymond Garlick. He was not a Modernist, but had been taught Wordsworth at school and was heavily influenced by Romanticism, an influence shown in poems such as "The Passing of Guto", which was praised by T. S. Eliot. He admitted to having been brought up on Palgrave's Golden Treasury, and his character "Alf" represents an Everyman. His work has been compared with that of Idris Davies, but Meic Stephens says that Huw Menai "lacks the power and passion" of Davies.

He eventually moved to Penygraig, and often faced hardship, receiving a civil list pension from 1949, thanks to the intervention of the Port Talbot Forum.

One of his sons, Alun Menai Williams, was an army medic and a prominent anti-Fascist campaigner who joined the International Brigade and fought in the Spanish Civil War.

== Works ==
- Through the Upcast Shaft (1920)
- The Passing of Guto (1927)
- Back in the Return (1933)
- The Simple Vision (1945)
