= John Chandless =

Welsh cricketer

Personal information
- Full name: John Chandless
- Born: 21 August 1884; Cardiff, Glamorgan, Wales
- Died: 1 June 1968 (aged 83); Whitchurch, Glamorgan, Wales
- Batting: Right-handed
- Bowling: Right-arm medium

Domestic team information
- Years: Team
- 1927: Glamorgan
- 1926: Wales

Career statistics
| Competition | FC |
|---|---|
| Matches | 2 |
| Runs scored | 2 |
| Batting average | 2.00 |
| 100s/50s | –/– |
| Top score | 2 |
| Balls bowled | 306 |
| Wickets | 6 |
| Bowling average | 15.83 |
| 5 wickets in innings | – |
| 10 wickets in match | – |
| Best bowling | 3/13 |
| Catches/stumpings | –/– |
- Source: Cricinfo, 28 June 2010

John Chandless (21 August 1884 – 1 June 1968) was a Welsh cricketer. Chandless was a right-handed batsman who bowled right-arm medium pace. He was born at Cardiff, Glamorgan.

Chandless made his debut for Glamorgan in the 1911 Minor Counties Championship against Wiltshire. Chandless played a further 6 Minor Counties Championship matches in 1911, the last of which came against Monmouthshire. Following the First World War he played 3 further Minor Counties matches for the county, the last of which came against the Surrey Second XI, a year before Glamorgan was granted first-class status.

Chandless made his first-class status debut for the Wales national cricket team in 1926 against Ireland. Chandless second and final first-class match came in his only first-class appearance for Glamorgan which came against Somerset in 1927 at Cardiff Arms Park. In his brief first-class career, he took 6 wickets at a bowling average of 15.83, with best figures of 3/13.

Chandless died at Whitchurch, Glamorgan on 1 June 1968.
