= Joan J. Taylor =

American archaeologist (1940–2019)

Joan J. Taylor FSA (1940 – 24 October 2019) was an American archaeologist specialising in the prehistory of the British Isles. She was known for her work on Bronze Age gold working, especially her 1980 monograph Bronze Age Goldwork of the British Isles.

Born in the United States, Taylor completed her doctoral research at the University of Cambridge in 1973. She was appointed the Rankin Lecturer in Prehistoric Archaeology at the University of Liverpool in 1976. A festschrift in her honour, Of Things Gone but not Forgotten: essays in archaeology for Joan Taylor, was published in 2012.
