= Thomas Jones (footballer, born 1884) =

Welsh footballer and manager

Personal information
- Full name: Thomas Daniel Jones
- Date of birth: 1884
- Place of birth: Aberaman, Wales
- Date of death: 8 February 1958
- Place of death: Porthcawl, Wales
- Position: Inside left

Senior career*
Years	Team	Apps	(Gls)
–1903	Aberaman		
1903–1904	Aberdare Athletic		
1904–1905	Nottingham Forest	2	(0)
1905–?	Aberdare Athletic		

International career
1908	Wales	1	(0)

Managerial career
- 1923–1924: Merthyr Town
- * Club domestic league appearances and goals

Thomas Daniel Jones (1884 – 8 February 1958) was a Welsh footballer and football club manager. He represented Wales at international level on one occasion.

Jones was born in Aberaman where his father was a grocer and also the Constable of Higher Miskin, an ancient office and ceremonial post. He played for his local side before joining Aberdare Athletic in 1903.

In 1904, Jones joined Nottingham Forest, remaining an amateur as he did throughout his career. He made two league appearances for Forest.

In 1908 he made his only appearance for the Wales national team, a 1–0 defeat against Ireland, played at Aberdare.

In the summer of 1923, Jones took over as secretary-manager of Merthyr Town, guiding them to a respectable 13th place in Division Three (South). He left his post in 1924 and later worked as a scout for Cardiff City. He was also a vice-president of the FA of Wales.

Preceded by Harry Hadley	Merthyr Town Manager	Succeeded by Albert Lindon
