= Rhys Lewis (novel) =

Rhys Lewis is a novel by Daniel Owen, written in the Welsh language and published in 1885. Its full title is Hunangofiant Rhys Lewis, Gweinidog Bethel ("The autobiography of Rhys Lewis, minister of Bethel"). It is agreed to be the first significant novel written in the Welsh language and is to date one of the longest. It deals with the issues of evangelical Christian faith in a rapidly changing society affected by increasing exposure to outside influences, industrialisation with the inevitable strife that follows, and (perhaps most dangerous of all) the adoption by mainstream popular culture of certain aspects of Christianity whilst completely misunderstanding the essence of it.

The novel was originally serialised in a Welsh-language periodical, Y Drysorfa ("The Treasury") between 1882 and 1885, before publication in a single volume. Although not Owen's first prose work, it was the book that made his name.

The novel has been adapted for Welsh-language television (S4C).

The first English translation was made by James Harris in 1888, but is somewhat stilted and has not achieved a wide circulation. A new contemporary English translation by Stephen Morris was published in October 2015, ISBN 978-0-9567031-3-2. In 2017 a rare copy of the 1885 private subscription edition published by J. LL. Morris in Mold, was translated into English for the first time by Robert Lomas ISBN 978-1546721574.

== Synopsis ==
Most of the action in the novel takes place in Mold, the small town in Flintshire from which the author came.

Rhys Lewis is the younger son in a poor family where the father is absent and the only source of income is what his older brother, Bob, earns as a coal miner. Much of this income is creamed off by Uncle James, a poacher and a very violent man who visits the family regularly though he is never welcome.

His mother, Mari Lewis, is a devout member of the Calvinistic Methodists and seeks to bring her two boys up in the same faith. Bob, the older brother, despite working as a miner, is keen on self-improvement. He teaches himself English and the books he reads lead him to doubt the simplicity of his mother's faith; he is excommunicated from the Calvinistic Methodists after attacking Rhys's schoolteacher when he caught the latter beating Rhys, but continues searching for the truth whilst becoming active as a leader among the miners in their fight against an incompetent English supervisor who is badly mismanaging the mine to the detriment of the owners and workers alike. After a workers' riot which he has tried hard to prevent, Bob is imprisoned on false charges; during his absence, the family declines into deep poverty. Meanwhile, the English steward is fired and replaced by his Welsh predecessor, who is also a deacon with the Congregationalists, and who sees that the family is provided for and that Bob is reinstated on good terms when he comes out of prison. Bob eventually comes to faith in a deathbed conversion following a mining accident, saying, after having been blinded in an explosion, "the light has come at last. Doctor, it is broad daylight!".

Rhys and his mother are left without any income but are offered a home (and protected against Uncle James) by a simple-minded but generous cobbler called Thomas Bartley, a recent convert. Rhys is apprenticed to Abel Hughes, an elder in the chapel who owns a drapers shop, and moves into Abel's house when his mother dies a short time afterwards. As he grows into adolescence, he falls away from the devout faith that his mother taught him whilst nurturing a secret desire to be a preacher, being dazzled by the status that preachers had in Welsh society at the time. His best friend, Wil Bryan, leads him further and further astray until an incident where they very nearly kill a man brings Rhys to a crisis of conscience. He realises that, despite his upbringing, he was never really a Christian in the proper sense at all. He eventually confesses his predicament to Abel Hughes who, instead of casting him out as he'd expected, treats him kindly and gives him good advice about how to find a true faith in Christ. The light dawns and Rhys becomes a zealous member of the chapel and is set on the path towards being a preacher after all. However, just as he is about to go to college, Abel dies and Uncle James cheats him out of all the savings he had up to that point, leaving him penniless once again.

By taking responsibility for the disposal of Abel's business and doing so completely honestly, despite overwhelming temptations to the contrary, Rhys is enabled to go to college with the support of Abel's elderly spinster sister and Thomas Bartley. He does creditably there, despite the disadvantages of his poor upbringing, and is surprised to find himself called to be the minister of the Calvinistic Methodist chapel in which he was brought up. However, he feels he cannot accept the call because of the shame that his family bears due to the antics of his Uncle James and (he suspects) his father. On the same day as he receives the call from his chapel, he learns that Uncle James has died in prison in Birmingham. Desperate to find whether Uncle James might have said anything to anyone about his father before he died, he travels to Birmingham and, following a complex sequence of events, comes face to face with his father. The experience is deeply traumatic, but clears the way for him to accept the call to the ministry and he pursues a short but successful career as a Calvinistic Methodist minister before dying relatively young from a wasting disease (very likely tuberculosis). The whole novel is presented as if it were the autobiography he wrote between being forced to retire from the ministry and his eventual death.

== Quotation ==
"Comparing the child and the man, how different and yet how similar they are! I wouldn’t for all the world want to deny my selfhood, or exchange my consciousness for that of another. I have many times felt pity for the river Alyn at the point where it loses itself in the Dee. From Llanarmon-yn-Iâl down to Cilcain, through the Belan and all along the vale of Mold, how independent, bright and cheerful it looks! But as it approaches Holt, its face changes, and its obvious dismay at the prospect of losing itself in the Dee can be seen in the way it flows. I don’t know how other men feel; but I’m glad to think that I am always the same, and I would not for anything want to lose my Self. Isn’t this what madness is? ‘He forgot himself’ is the expression used, isn’t it, about one who goes mad? Well, I’m glad to be able to cast my mind back, and follow the course of my life through various periods, circumstances and prospects through to now, and remember that I have always been the same person. And I’m more glad still to think that when, who knows how soon, I leap into the great world of eternity, I’ll still be the same, and will not lose myself in anyone else in the same way as the poor Alyn. How wonderful! After thousands of ages, I will have the same consciousness as I had when I went hand-in-hand with my mother to chapel for the first time"
