= Daniel Owen =

Welsh novelist (1836–1895)

Daniel Owen (20 October 1836 – 22 October 1895) was a Welsh novelist. He is generally regarded as the foremost Welsh-language novelist of the 19th century and the first significant novelist to write in Welsh.

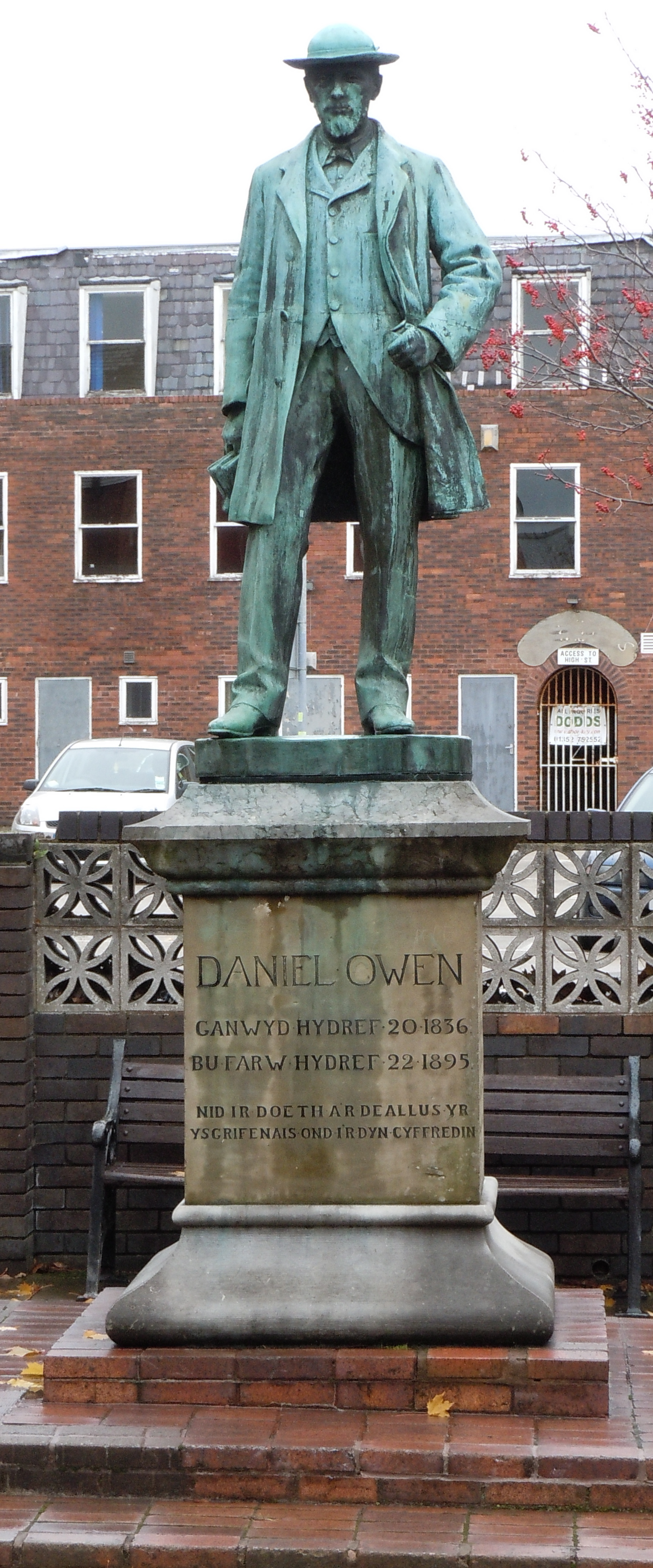
Statue of Daniel Owen outside the Library in his home town of Mold

== Early life ==
Daniel Owen was born in Mold (Yr Wyddgrug), Flintshire, the youngest of six children in a working-class family. His father, Robert Owen, was a coal miner, while his mother belonged to the family of Thomas Edwards, poet and writer. His father and his two brothers, James and Robert, were killed on 10 May 1837 when the Argoed mine became flooded. The loss impacted heavily on the family, who remained in poverty. Owen received little formal education, but he acknowledged his debt to his Sunday School.

Owen, aged 12, was apprenticed to a tailor, Angel Jones, an elder in the Calvinistic Methodist Church. Owen described his apprenticeship as a "kind of college", and began writing poetry under the influence of a colleague there. Owen found chances to discuss and argue topics with colleagues and customers there.

== Early writings ==
Owen began writing poetry under the pseudonym Glaslwyn, entering his work into local eisteddfodau and managed to publish some pieces. His first significant work in Welsh was a translation of Timothy Shay Arthur's novelette Ten Nights in a Bar-Room and What I Saw There. This came out fortnightly in the Methodist journal Charles o'r Bala. Owen then trained unsuccessfully for the ministry of his church, preaching from 1860. He enrolled in Bala Theological College in 1865, but failed to complete the course. From 1867 until the end of his life, he worked as a tailor in Mold, preaching on Sundays until prevented by illness.

Later his mentor, Roger Edwards, suggested he try his hand at writing instead. Owen's first attempt at fiction was a short story, Cymeriadau Methodistaidd (Methodist Characters) about the election of chapel elders. Its modest success led Edwards to encourage Owen to embark on a first novel, Y Dreflan, which described a fictionalized version of Mold.

== Mature work ==
Although Y Dreflan was popular in its time, Owen's reputation rests mainly on three later novels, particularly Rhys Lewis and its sequel Enoc Huws. There he again explored a fictionalized version of Mold and its Methodist chapel culture, blending comedy with satire and psychological introspection. His work has been compared with that of Charles Dickens, who was a likely influence, although Owen's work is uniquely informed by his own Welsh-language culture and chapel background.

== List of works ==
- Deng Noswaith Yn y `Black Lion` (1859)
- Offrymau Neilltuaeth (1879)
- Y Dreflan (1881)
- Rhys Lewis (1885)
- Y Siswrn (1886)
- Enoc Huws (1891)
- Gwen Tomos (1894)
- Straeon y Pentan (short stories) (1895)

== Legacy ==
Although not the first to write novels in Welsh, Owen is the earliest Welsh-language novelist still widely read. He is credited with starting a tradition of novel-writing in Welsh that influenced later fiction writers such as Kate Roberts and T. Rowland Hughes.

Owen is commemorated in Mold by a statue and the name of a shopping precinct and cultural centre. He is also remembered in the Daniel Owen Memorial Prize (Gwobr Goffa Daniel Owen), awarded at the National Eisteddfod since 1978, whenever there are entries of high enough quality, for the best unpublished novel of no less than 50,000 words with a strong story. Mold also centres an annual cultural festival on Owen's life and works.
