= History of Middlesbrough =

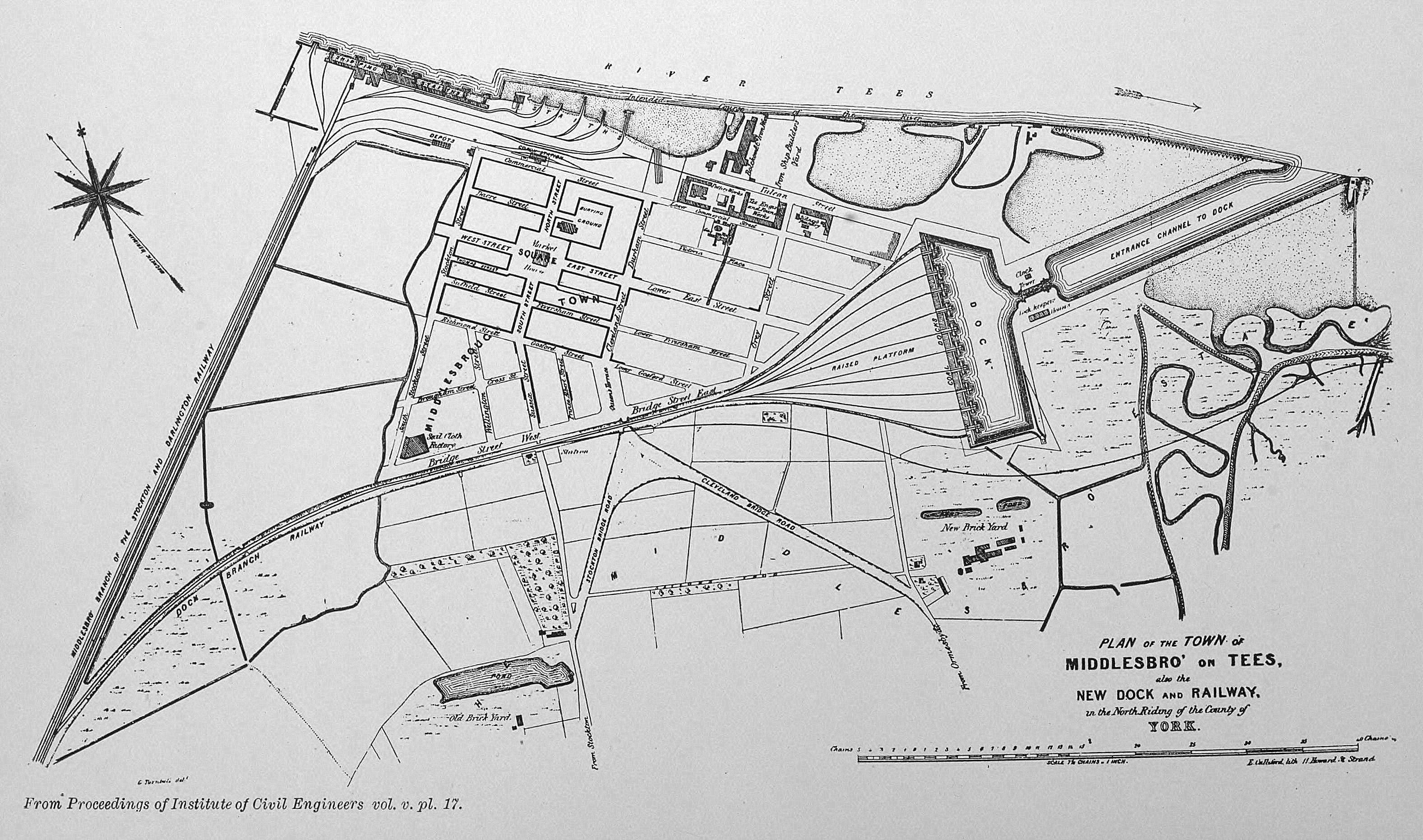
Plan of old Middlesbrough

Middlesbrough started as a Benedictine priory on the south bank of the River Tees, its name possibly derived from it being midway between the holy sites of Durham and Whitby. The earliest recorded form of Middlesbrough's name is "Mydilsburgh", containing the term burgh.

== Northumbria ==
In 686, a monastic cell was consecrated by St. Cuthbert at the request of St. Hilda, Abbess of Whitby. The manor of Middlesburgh belonged to Whitby Abbey and Guisborough Priory. Robert Bruce, Lord of Cleveland and Annandale, granted and confirmed, in 1119, the church of St. Hilda of Middleburg to Whitby. Up until its closure on the Dissolution of the Monasteries by Henry VIII in 1537, the church was maintained by 12 Benedictine monks, many of whom became vicars, or rectors, of various places in Cleveland.

== Dane and Norse law ==
After the Angles, the area became home to Viking settlers. Names of Viking origin (with the suffix by meaning village) are abundant in the area; for example, Ormesby, Stainsby and Tollesby were once separate villages that belonged to Vikings called Orm, Steinn and Toll that are now areas of Middlesbrough were recorded in the Domesday Book of 1086. Other names around Middlesbrough include the village of Maltby (of Malti) along with the towns of Ingleby Barwick (Anglo-place and barley-wick) and Thornaby (of Thormod).

Links persist in the area, often through school or road names, to now-outgrown or abandoned local settlements, such as the medieval settlement of Stainsby, deserted by 1757, which amounts to little more today than a series of grassy mounds near the A19 road.

== Coal, port and docks ==
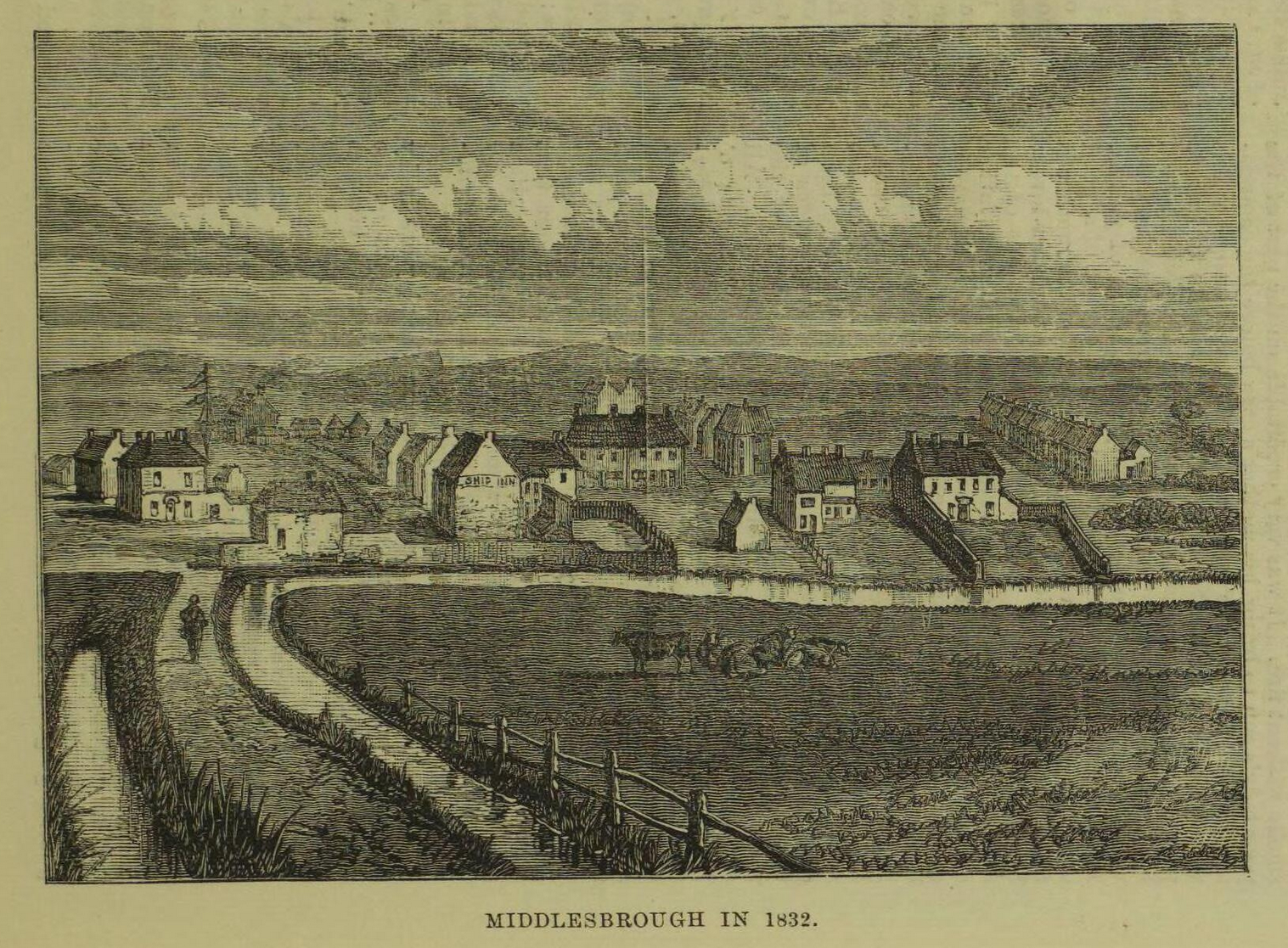
Middlesbrough in 1832, from an engraving from Illustrated London News, 8th October 1881

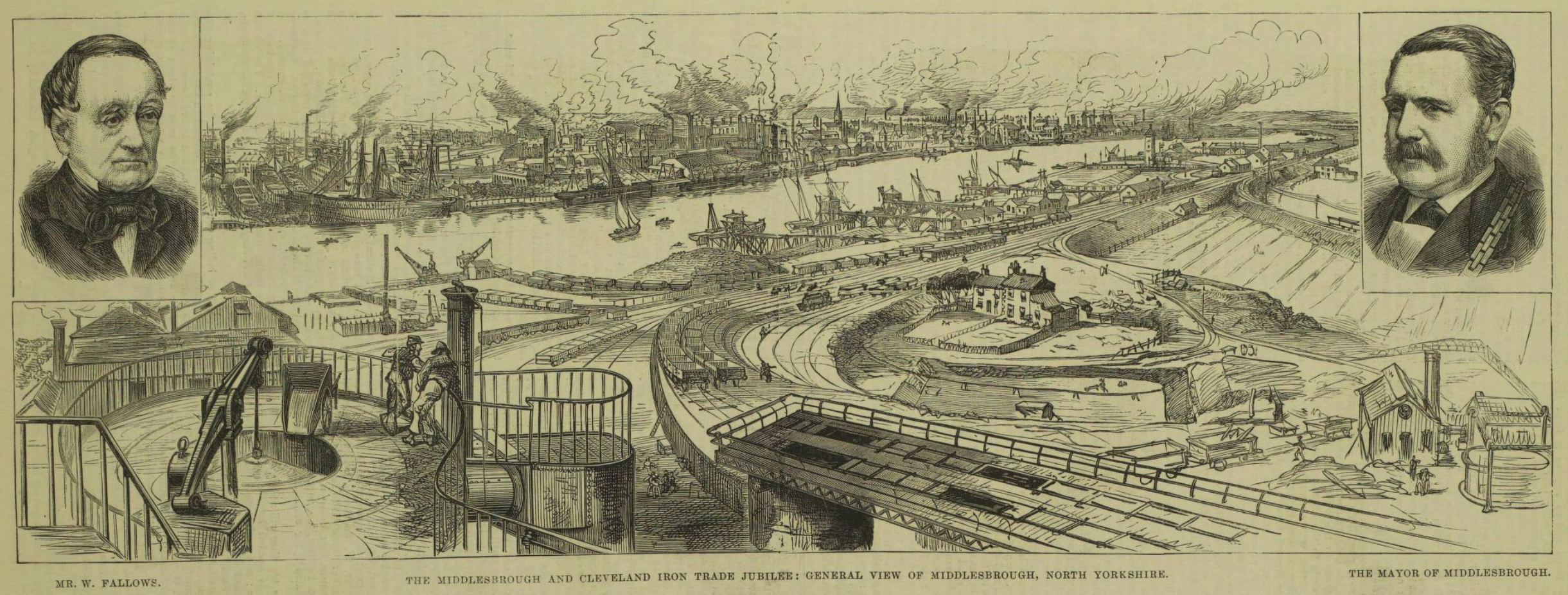
Middlesbrough 50 years later, in 1881

In 1801, Middlesbrough was a small farm with a population of just 25; however, during the latter half of the 19th century, it experienced rapid growth. In 1828 the influential Quaker banker, coal mine owner and Stockton and Darlington Railway (S&DR) shareholder Joseph Pease sailed up the River Tees to find a suitable new site downriver of Stockton on which to place new coal staithes. As a result, in 1829 he and a group of Quaker businessmen bought the Middlesbrough farmstead and associated estate, some 527 acres (213 ha) of land, and established the Middlesbrough Estate Company.

Through the company, the investors set about a new coal port development (designed by John Harris) on the southern banks of the Tees. The first coal shipping staithes at the port (known as "Port Darlington") were constructed with a settlement to the east established on the site of Middlesbrough farm as labour for the port, taking on the farm's name as it developed into a village. The small farmstead became a village of streets such as North Street, South Street, West Street, East Street, Commercial Street, Stockton Street and Cleveland Street, laid out in a grid-iron pattern around a market square, with the first house being built on West Street in April 1830. New businesses bought premises and plots of land in the new town including: shippers, merchants, butchers, innkeepers, joiners, blacksmiths, tailors, builders and painters.

The first coal shipping staithes at the port (known as "Port Darlington") were constructed just to the west of the site earmarked for the location of Middlesbrough. The port was linked to the S&DR on 27 December 1830 via a branch that extended to an area just north of the current Middlesbrough railway station, helping secure the town's future.

The success of the port meant it soon became overwhelmed by the volume of imports and exports, and in 1839 work started on Middlesbrough Dock. Laid out by Sir William Cubitt, the whole infrastructure was built by resident civil engineer George Turnbull. After three years and an expenditure of £122,000 (equivalent to £9.65 million at 2011 prices), first water was let in on 19 March 1842, and the formal opening took place on 12 May 1842. On completion, the docks were bought by the S&DR.

== Ironopolis ==
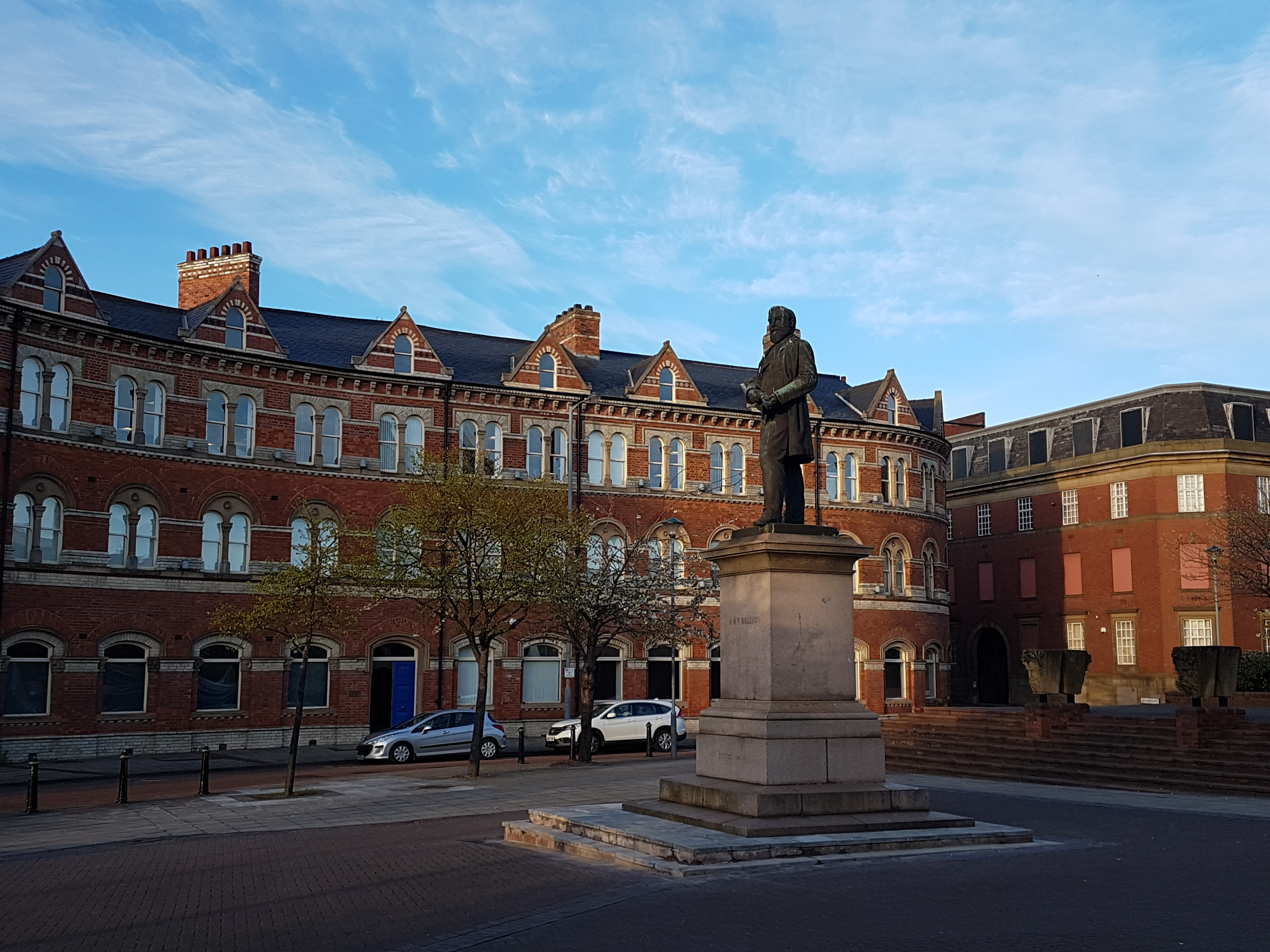
Henry Bolckow statue in exchange square

Iron and steel have dominated the Tees area since 1841 when Henry Bolckow in partnership with John Vaughan, founded the Vulcan iron foundry and rolling mill. Vaughan, who had worked his way up through the Iron industry in South Wales, used his technical expertise to find a more abundant supply of Ironstone in the Eston Hills in 1850, and introduced the new "Bell Hopper" system of closed blast furnaces developed at the Ebbw Vale works. These factors made the works an unprecedented success with Teesside becoming known as the "Iron-smelting centre of the world" and Bolckow, Vaughan & Co., Ltd became the largest company in existence.

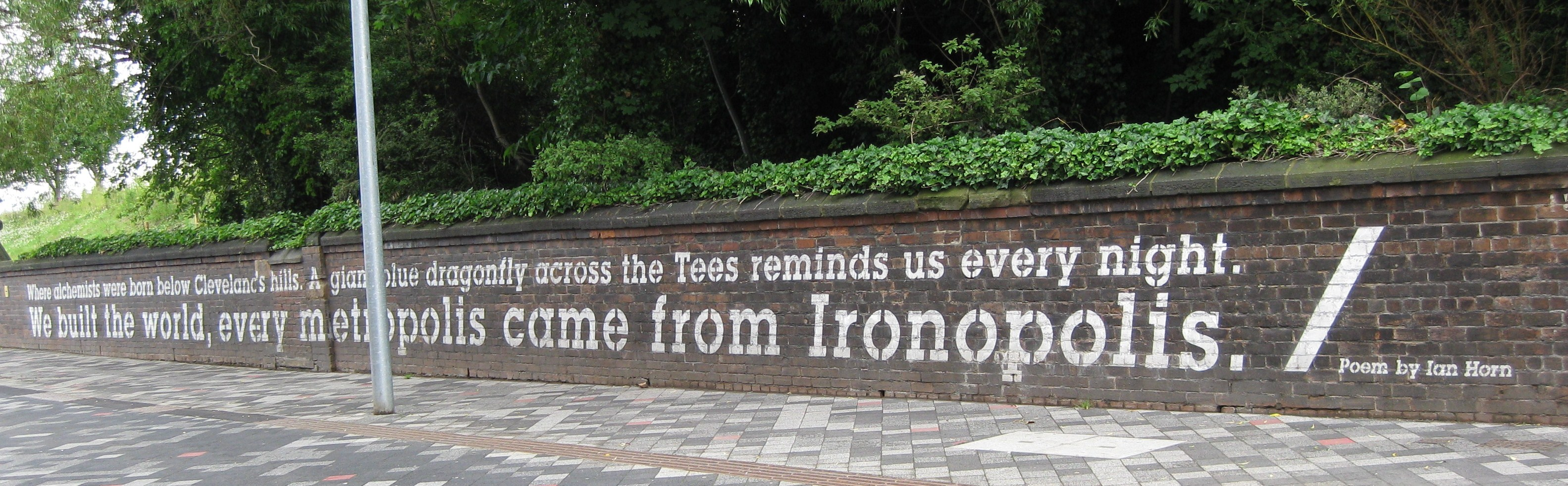
A wall celebrating the name Ironopolis

By 1851 Middlesbrough's population had grown from 40 people in 1829 to 7,600. Pig iron production rose tenfold between 1851 and 1856 and by the mid-1870s Middlesbrough was producing one third of the entire nations Pig Iron output. It was during this time Middlesbrough earned the nickname "Ironopolis".

Outer Middlesbrough on the 1848-1857 Ordnance Survey map

On 21 January 1853, Middlesbrough received its Royal Charter of Incorporation, giving the town the right to have a mayor, aldermen and councillors. Henry Bolckow became mayor, in 1853.

== Welsh migration ==
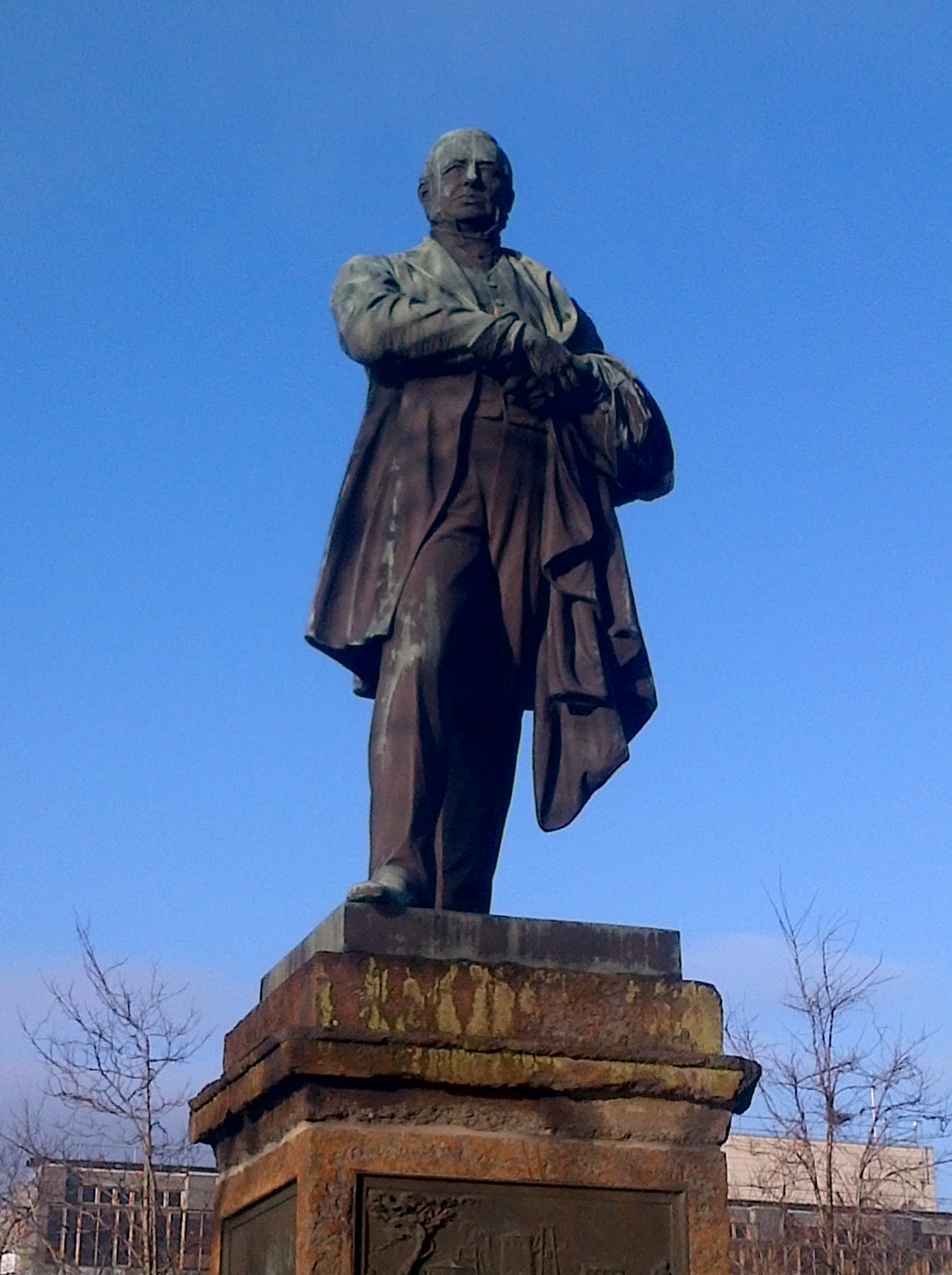
The monument to John Vaughan. The inscription names him as 'founder of the iron trade in Middlesbrough'.

A Welsh community was established in Middlesbrough sometime before the 1840s, with mining being the main form of employment. These migrants included figures who would become important leaders in the commercial, political and cultural life of the town:

- John Vaughan established Teesside's first ironworks in 1841, The Vulcan Works at Middlesbrough. Vaughan had worked his way up through the industry at the Dowlais Ironworks in south Wales and encouraged hundreds of the skilled Welsh workers to follow him to Teesside.
- Edward Williams (iron-master), although he was the grandson of the famous Welsh Bard Iolo Morganwg, Edward had started as a mere clerk at Dowlais. His move to the Tees saw him rise to ironmaster, alderman, magistrate and Mayor of Middlesbrough. Edward was also the father of Aneurin and Penry, who both became Liberal MPs for the area.
- E.T. John arrived from Pontypridd as a junior clerk in Williams' office. John became the director of several industrial enterprises and a radical politician.
- Windsor Richards, an Engineer and manager, oversaw the town's transition from iron to steel production.

Much like the contemporary Welsh migration to America, the Welsh of Middlesbrough came almost exclusively from the iron-smelting and coal districts of South Wales. By 1861 42% of the town's ironworkers identified as Welsh and one in twenty of the total population. Place names such as "Welch Cottages" and "Welch Place" appeared around the Vulcan works, and Middlesbrough became a centre for the Welsh communities at Witton Park, Spennymoor, Consett and Stockton on Tees (especially Portrack). David Williams also recorded that a number of the Welsh workers at the Hughesovka Ironworks in 1869 had migrated from Middlesbrough.

=== Cultural impact ===
A Welsh Baptist chapel was active in the town as early as 1858, and St Hilda's Anglican church began providing services in the Welsh language. Churches and chapels were the centres of Welsh culture, supporting choirs, Sunday Schools, social societies, adult education, lectures and literary meetings. By the 1870s, many more Welsh chapels were built (one reputed to seat 500 people), and the first Eisteddfodau were held.

"It was delightful to him, to come again to that portion of Wales, called North East England, and meet once again so many of his old friends."

— 'Address to The Cleveland and Durham Eisteddfod', North Eastern Daily Gazette. 2 January 1900.

By the 1880s, a "Welsh cultural revival" was underway, with the Eisteddfodau attracting competitors and spectators from outside the Welsh communities. In 1890 the Middlesbrough Town Hall hosted the first Cleveland and Durham Eisteddfod, an event notable for its non-denominational inclusivity, with Irish Catholic choirs and the bishop of the newly created Roman Catholic Diocese of Middlesbrough as honoured guests.

In the early twentieth century this Eisteddfod had become the biggest annual event in the town and the largest annual Eisteddfod outside Wales. The Eisteddfod had a clear impact on the culture of the town, especially through its literary and music events, by 1911 the Eisteddfod had twenty-two classes of musical competition only two of which were for Welsh language content. By 1914, thirty choirs from across the area were competing in 284 entries. A choral tradition remained part of the town's culture long after the eisteddfod and chapels had gone. In 2012 an exhibition at the Dorman Museum marked the Apollo Male Voice Choir's 125 years as an active choir in the town.

=== Political impact ===
Industrial Wales was noted for its "radical Liberal-Labour" politics, and the rhetoric of these politicians clearly won favour with the urban population of the North East. Penry Williams and Jonathan Samuel won the seats of Middlesbrough and Stockton-on-Tees for the Liberal Party and Penry's brother, Aneurin would also win the newly created Consett seat in 1918.

Sir Horace Davey stressed his Welsh lineage and stated that "it was scarcely an exaggeration to say that Welshmen had founded Middlesbrough", courting the Welsh vote that saw him elected MP for Stockton. However, others complained that local Conservative candidates were losing to "Fenians and Welshers" (Irish and Welsh people).

These sentiments had grown by 1900 when Samuel lost his seat after a Unionist complained publicly that the town had been "forced to submit to the indignity of being trailed ignominiously through the mire by Welsh constituents". Samuel lost the seat but regained it in 1910 with a campaign that made few, if any, references to his Welsh background.

== Irish migration ==
From 1861 to 1871, the census of England & Wales showed that Middlesbrough consistently had the second highest percentage of Irish born people in England after Liverpool. The Irish population in 1861 accounted for 15.6% of the total population of Middlesbrough. In 1871 the amount had dropped to 9.2% yet this still placed Middlesbrough's Irish population second in England behind Liverpool. Due to the rapid development of the town and its industrialisation there was much need for people to work in the many blast furnaces and steel works along the banks of the Tees. This attracted many people from Ireland, who were in much need of work. As well as people from Ireland, the Scottish, Welsh and overseas inhabitants made up 16% of Middlesbrough's population in 1871. A second influx of Irish migration was observed in the early 1900s as Middlesbrough's steel industry boomed producing 1/3 of Britain's total steel output. This second influx lasted through to the 1950s after which Irish migration to Middlesbrough saw a drastic decline. Middlesbrough no longer has a strong Irish presence, with Irish born residents making up around 2% of the current population, however there is still a strong cultural and historical connection with Ireland mainly through the heritage and ancestry of many families within Middlesbrough.

== Production boom ==
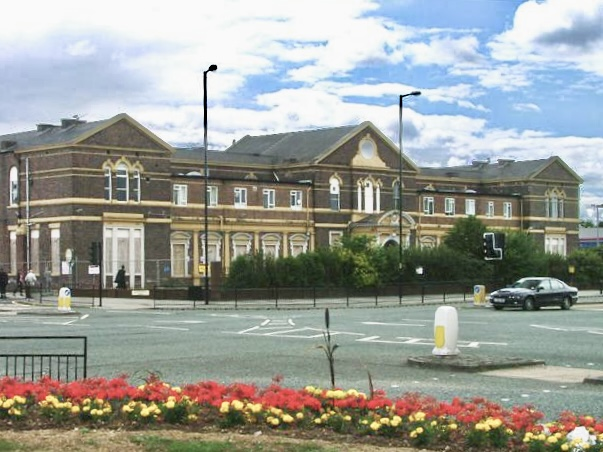
Former North Riding Infirmary in 2005, knocked down in 2006

The town's rapid expansion continued throughout the second half of the 19th century, fuelled by the iron and steel industry. In 1864 the North Riding Infirmary (an ear, nose and mouth hospital) opened in Newport Road; this was demolished in 2006.

On 15 August 1867, a Reform Bill was passed, making Middlesbrough a new parliamentary borough, Bolckow was elected member for Middlesbrough the following year. In 1875, Bolckow, Vaughan & Co opened the Cleveland Steelworks in Middlesbrough beginning the transition from Iron production to Steel and by the turn of the century. Henry Bolckow died in 1878 and left an endowment of £5,000 for the infirmary.

In the latter third of the 19th century, Old Middlesbrough was starting to decline and was overshadowed by developments built around the new town hall, south of the original town hall, the town's population reaching 90,000 by the dawn of the 20th century. In 1900, Bolckow, Vaughan & Co had become the largest producer of steel in Great Britain and possibly came to be one of the major steel centres in the world.

In 1914, Dorman Long, another major steel producer from Middlesbrough, became the largest company in Britain. It employed a workforce of over 20,000 and by 1929 and gained enough to take over from Bolckow, Vaughan & Co's dominance and to acquire their assets. The steel components of the Sydney Harbour Bridge (1932) were engineered and fabricated by Dorman Long of Middlesbrough. The company was also responsible for the New Tyne Bridge in Newcastle.

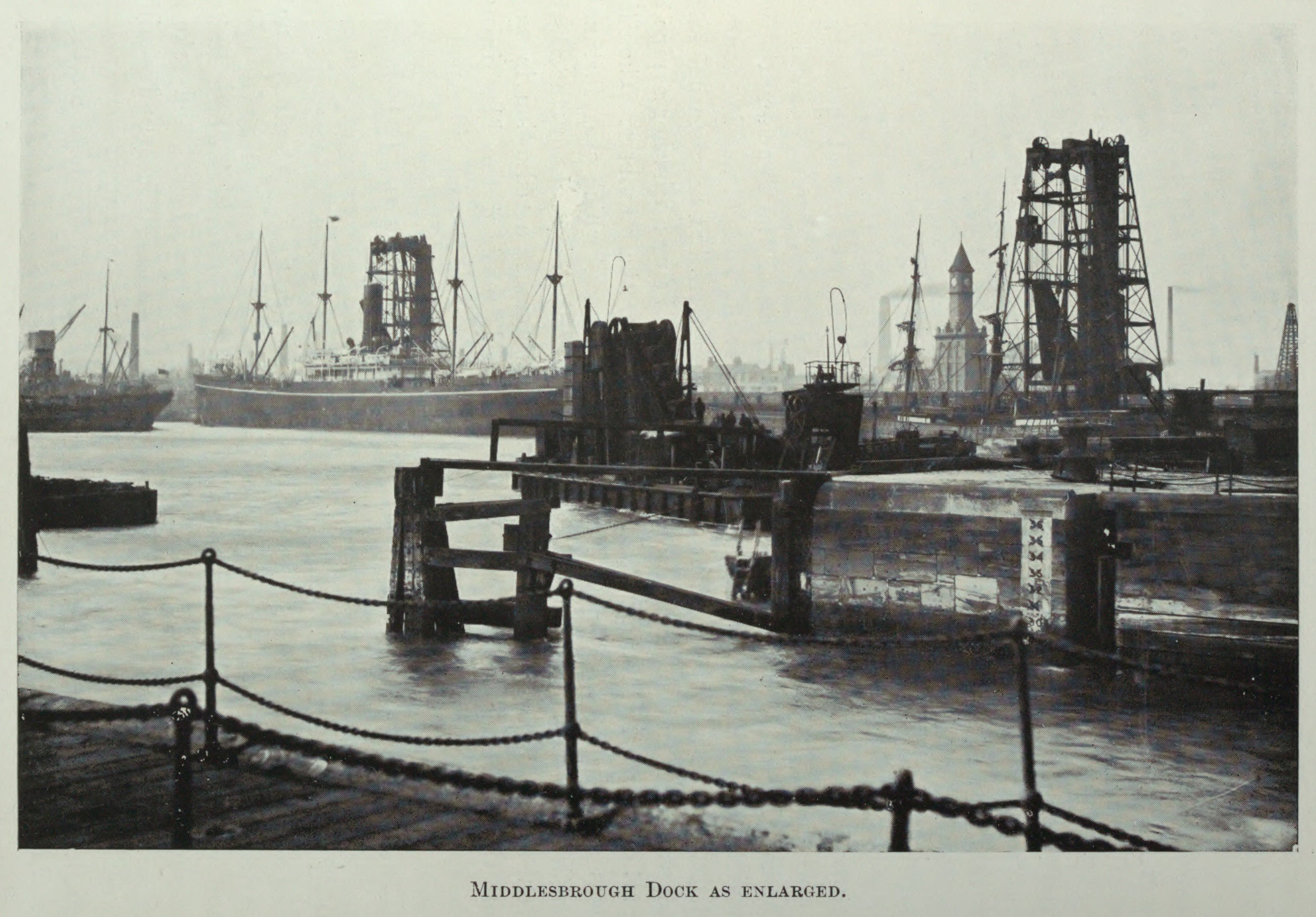
The Middlesbrough Docks in 1915, the clock tower to the centre right still exists

Several large shipyards also lined the Tees, including the Sir Raylton Dixon & Company, Smith's Dock Company of South Bank and Furness Shipbuilding Company of Haverton Hill.

Middlesbrough was the first major British town and industrial target to be bombed during the Second World War. The Luftwaffe first attacked the town on 25 May 1940 when a lone bomber dropped 13 bombs between South Bank Road and the South Steel Plant. One of the bombs fell on the South Bank football ground making a large crater in the pitch. The bomber was forced to leave after RAF night fighters were scrambled to intercept. Two months after the first bombing Prime Minister Winston Churchill visited the town to meet the public and inspect coastal defences.

German bombers often flew over the Eston Hills while heading for targets further inland, such as Manchester. On 30 March 1941 a Junkers Ju 88 was shot down by two Spitfires of No. 41 Squadron, piloted by Tony Lovell and Archie Winskill, over Middlesbrough. The aircraft dived into the ground at Barnaby Moor, Eston; the engines and most of the airframe were entirely buried upon impact.

On 5 December 1941 a Spitfire of No. 122 Squadron, piloted by Sgt Hutton, crashed into rising ground near Mill Farm, Upsall, on the lower slopes of Eston Hills. Poor visibility due to bad weather and low cloud is believed to have been the cause of the crash.

On 15 January 1942, minutes after being hit by gunfire from a merchant ship anchored off Hartlepool, a Dornier Do 217 collided with the cable of a barrage balloon over the River Tees. The blazing bomber plummeted onto the railway sidings in South Bank leaving a crater twelve feet deep. In 1997 the remains of the Dornier were unearthed by a group of workers clearing land for redevelopment; the remains were put on display for a short while at Kirkleatham museum.

=== Railway station bombing ===
On 4 August 1942 a lone Dornier Do 217 picked its way through the barrage balloons and dropped a stick of bombs onto the railway station. One bomb caused serious damage to the Victorian glass and steel roof. A train in the station was also badly damaged although there were no passengers aboard. Eight people were killed, and the station was put out of action for two weeks.

== Green Howards ==
The Green Howards was a British Army infantry regiment very strongly associated with Middlesbrough and the area south of the River Tees. Originally formed at Dunster Castle, Somerset in 1688 to serve King William of Orange, later King William III, this regiment became affiliated to the North Riding of Yorkshire in 1782. As Middlesbrough grew, its population of men came to be a group most targeted by the recruiters. The Green Howards were part of the King's Division. On 6 June 2006, this famous regiment was merged into the new Yorkshire Regiment and are now known as 2 Yorks, The 2nd Battalion The Yorkshire Regiment (Green Howards). There is also a Territorial Army (TA) company at Stockton Road in Middlesbrough, part of 4 Yorks which is wholly reserve.

== Post Second World War to contemporary era ==
By the end of the war over 200 buildings had been destroyed within the Middlesbrough area. The borough lost 99 civilians as a result of enemy action.

Areas of early and mid-Victorian housing were demolished and much of central Middlesbrough was redeveloped. Heavy industry was relocated to areas of land better suited to the needs of modern technology. Middlesbrough itself began to take on a completely different look.

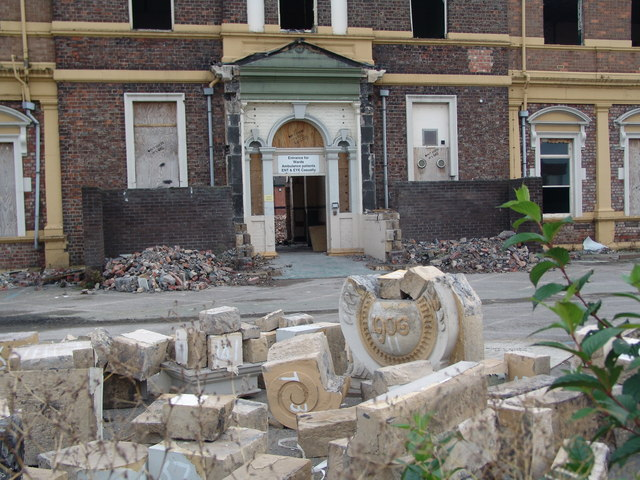
The North Riding Infirmary during demolition in 2006

Middlesbrough's 1903 Gaumont cinema, originally an opera house until the 1930s, was demolished in 1971. The Cleveland Centre opened in the same year. In 1974, Middlesbrough and other areas around the Tees, became part of the county of Cleveland. This was to create a county within a single NUTS region of England, with the UK joining the European Union predecessor (European Communities) a year earlier.

The A66 was built through the town in the 1980s, Middlesbrough's Royal Exchange building was demolished, to make way for the road. A multi-storey the Star and Garter Hotel built in the 1890s near to the exchange on the site of a former Welsh Congregational Church, was also demolished. The Victorian era North Riding Infirmary was demolished in 2006 and replaced by a hotel and supermarket.

The Cleveland Centre opened in 1971, Hill Street shopping centre opened in 1981 and Captain Cook Square opened in 1999.

Middlesbrough F.C.'s modern Riverside Stadium opened on 26 August 1995 next to Middlesbrough Dock. The club moved from Ayresome Park their previous home in the town for 92 years.

With the abolition of Cleveland County in 1996, Middlesbrough again became part of North Yorkshire.

The original St.Hilda's area of Middlesbrough, after decades of decline and clearance, was given a new name of Middlehaven in 1986 on investment proposals to build on the land. Middlehaven has since had new buildings built there including Middlesbrough College and Middlesbrough FC's Riverside Stadium amongst others. Also situated at Middlehaven is the "Boho" zone, offering office space to the area's business and to attract new companies, and also "Bohouse", housing. Some of the street names from the original grid-iron street plan of the town still exist in the area today.

The expansion of Middlesbrough southwards, eastwards and westwards continued throughout the 20th century absorbing villages such as Linthorpe, Acklam, Ormesby, Marton and Nunthorpe and continues to the present day.

== Gallery ==
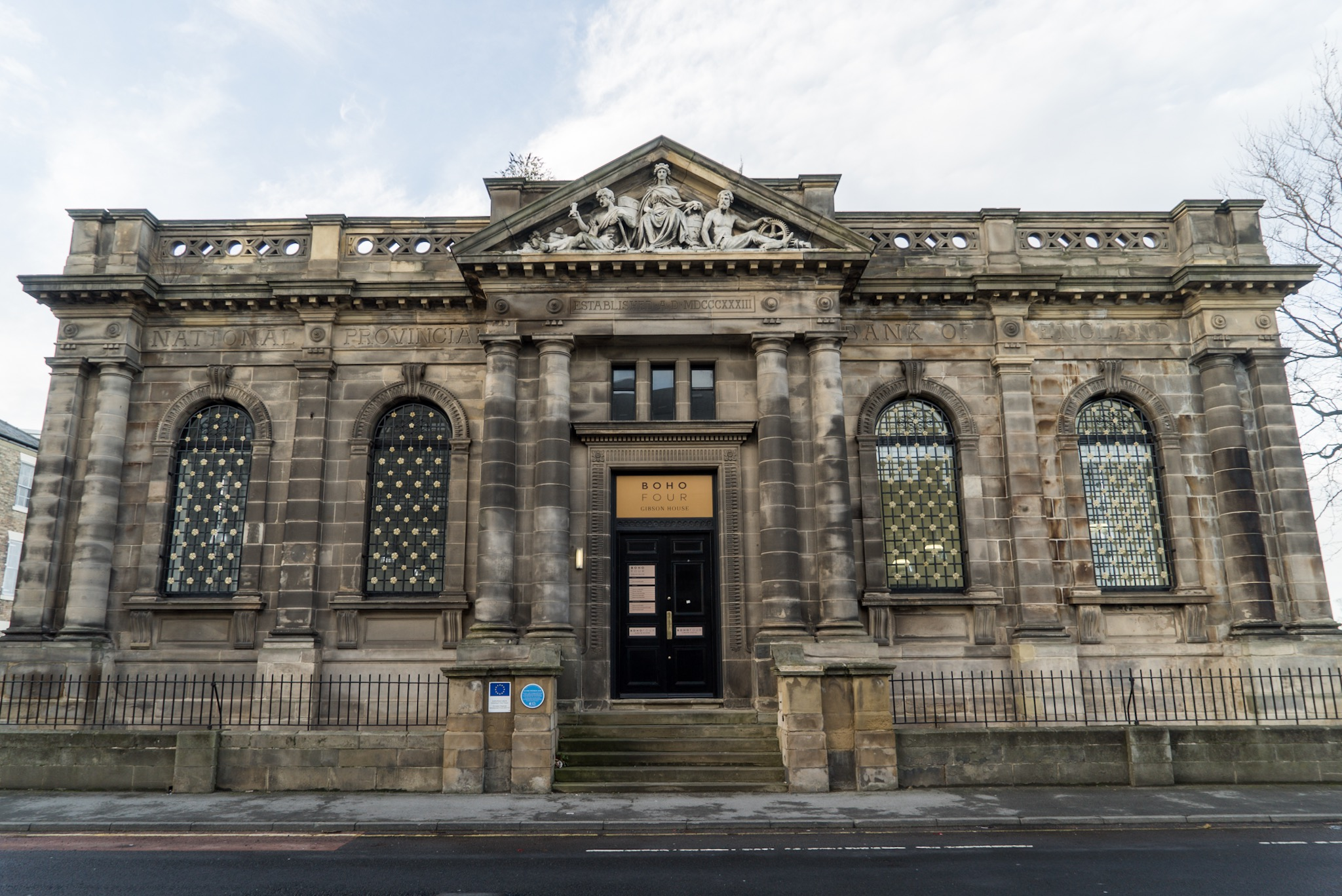
Boho Four (Gibson House), a former National Provincial Bank

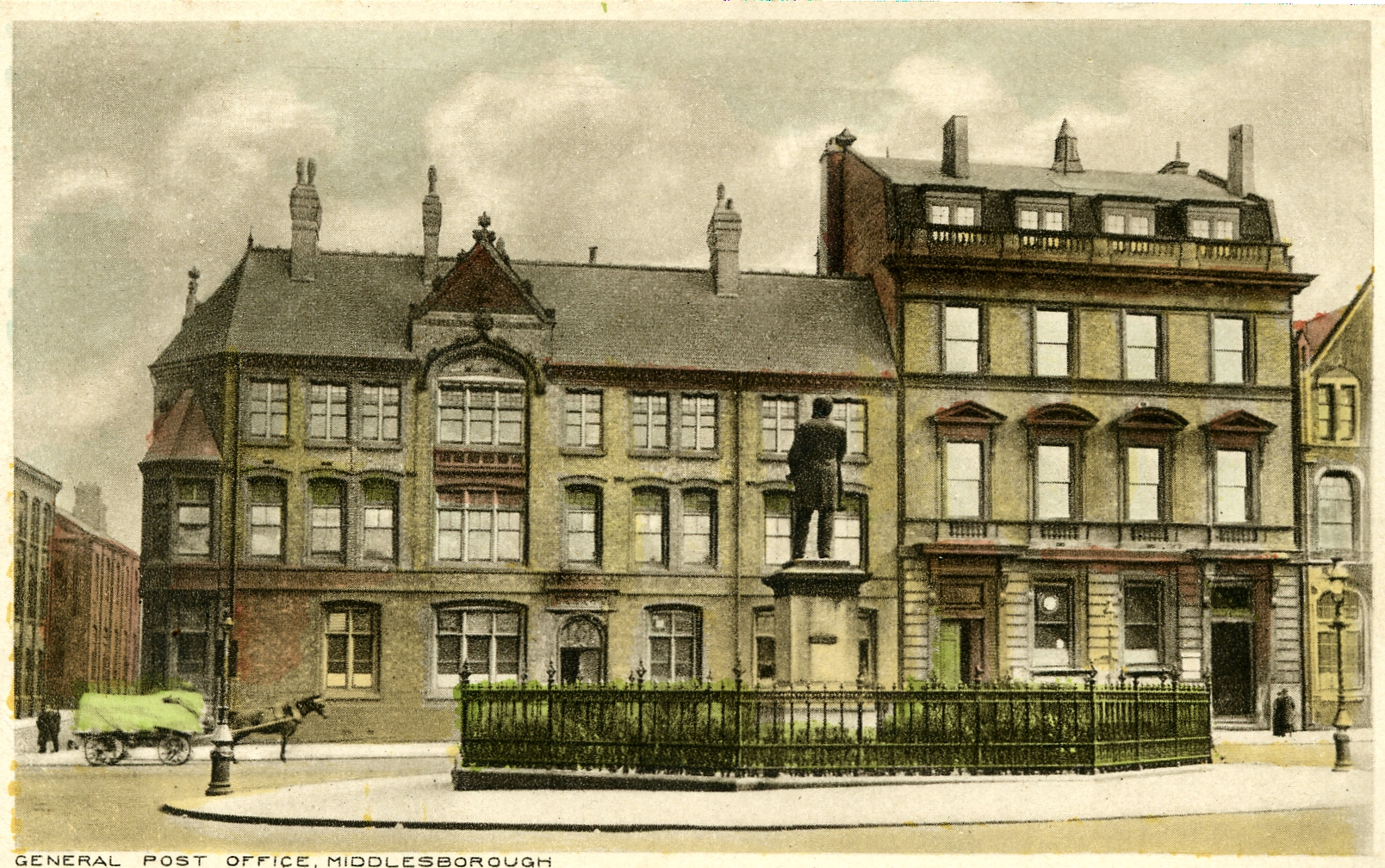
The old general post office

== See also ==
- History of Middlesbrough F.C.
- Ironstone mining in Cleveland and North Yorkshire
- History of Yorkshire
