= Aneurin =

Aneurin may refer to:

- Aneurin, an alternative name for thiamine (vitamin B_{1})
- Aneurin Barnard (born 1987), Welsh actor
- Aneurin Bevan (1897–1960), Welsh politician
- Aneurin Donald, Welsh cricketer
- Aneurin Hughes (1937–2020), British diplomat
- Aneurin Jones (1930–2017), Welsh artist
- Aneurin Livermore, Welsh footballer
- Aneurin Norman, Welsh cricketer
- Aneurin Owen (disambiguation)
- Aneurin Rees, Welsh rugby union player
- Aneurin Richards, Welsh footballer
- Aneurin Williams, British Liberal Party politician
- Iolo Aneurin Williams, British writer, journalist and Liberal Party politician
- John Aneurin Grey Griffith, Welsh legal scholar

== See also ==
- Aneirin, a 6th- or 7th-century Brythonic bard
