= Abertysswg =

Coordinates: 51.74234°N 3.26001°W

Abertysswg: Welsh: Abertyswg
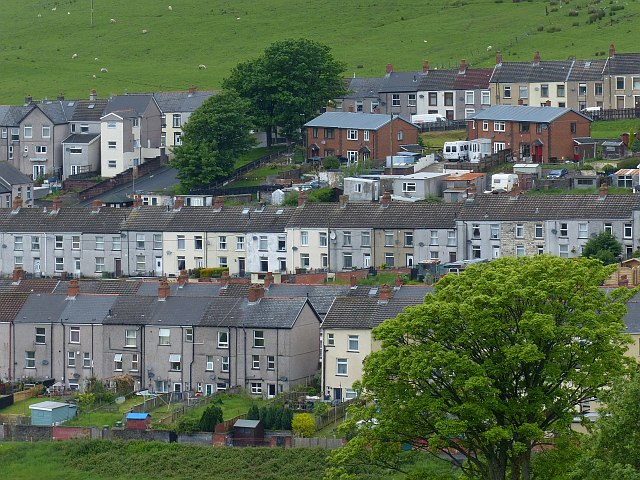

- Location within Caerphilly
- OS grid reference: SO131056
- Principal area: Caerphilly
- Preserved county: Gwent
- Country: Wales
- Sovereign state: United Kingdom
- Post town: Tredegar
- Postcode district: NP22
- Dialling code: 01685
- Police: Gwent
- Fire: South Wales
- Ambulance: Welsh
- UK Parliament: Blaenau Gwent and Rhymney
- Senedd Cymru – Welsh Parliament: Merthyr Tydfil and Rhymney

Abertysswg (Welsh: Abertyswg) is a village in the county borough of Caerphilly, Wales, within the historic boundaries of Monmouthshire.

== Location ==
Situated in the South Wales Valleys, Abertysswg is a small village located to the east of Pontlottyn and south-east of Rhymney. The nearest major town is Merthyr Tydfil. The Rhymney River lies just west of the village. Abertysswg is overlooked to the south by Twyn Cornicyll above Coed Cefn Rhychdir. The village came into being in 1895-1900 through industrialisation brought by the development of Abertysswg Colliery, the first shaft of which was sunk in 1897.

== Village commerce and industry ==
The village is within the South Wales Coalfield and used to have a pit at the end of Westville, although the mine closed in 1969. Most of the village's industry is now small scale retail. Abertysswg has a village shop, Post Office, takeaway and has two clubs.

== Year 2000 renovation ==
The village has had some renovation work completed on it in the new millennium. A new park/recreation area has been built, and a brand new community centre stands at the top of the village.

== Notable residents ==
- Jack Howells, film director, winner of the 1963 Academy Award for his short documentary film Dylan Thomas.
- Colin Lewis, an ex professional road cyclist, who was the first Welsh rider to compete in the Tour De France.
- Jamie Mathias, bassist of Bullet For My Valentine.

== In popular culture ==
The Doctor Who Big Finish Productions audio drama Black Thursday is set in the village.

== Bibliography ==
- Evans, Marion, (1994), A Portrait of Rhymney with cameos of Pontlottyn, Tafarnaubach, Princetown, Abertysswg and Fochriw, volume 1. Old Bakehouse Publications. ISBN 1-874538-40-9.
- Evans, Marion, (1995), A Portrait of Rhymney with cameos of Pontlottyn, Tafarnaubach, Princetown, Abertysswg and Fochriw, volume 2. Old Bakehouse Publications. ISBN 1-874538-70-0.
- Evans, Marion, (1996), A Portrait of Rhymney with cameos of Pontlottyn, Tafarnaubach, Princetown, Abertysswg and Fochriw, volume 3. Old Bakehouse Publications. ISBN 1-874538-41-7.
- Evans, Marion, (1998), A Portrait of Rhymney with cameos of Pontlottyn, Tafarnaubach, Princetown, Abertysswg and Fochriw, volume 4. Old Bakehouse Publications. ISBN 1-874538-02-6.
- Evans, Marion, (2009), A Portrait of Rhymney with cameos of Pontlottyn, Tafarnaubach, Princetown, Abertysswg and Fochriw, volume 5. Old Bakehouse Publications. ISBN 978-1-905967-20-9.
