= Middleboro =

Middleboro is the name of some places:

== Places ==
In the United States

- Middleboro, Indiana
- Middleboro, Ohio
- Middleborough, Massachusetts (sometimes spelled Middleboro)

Elsewhere

- Middleboro, Nova Scotia, Canada

== See also ==
- Middlesbrough (disambiguation)
