= George Gordon Hoskins =

English architect

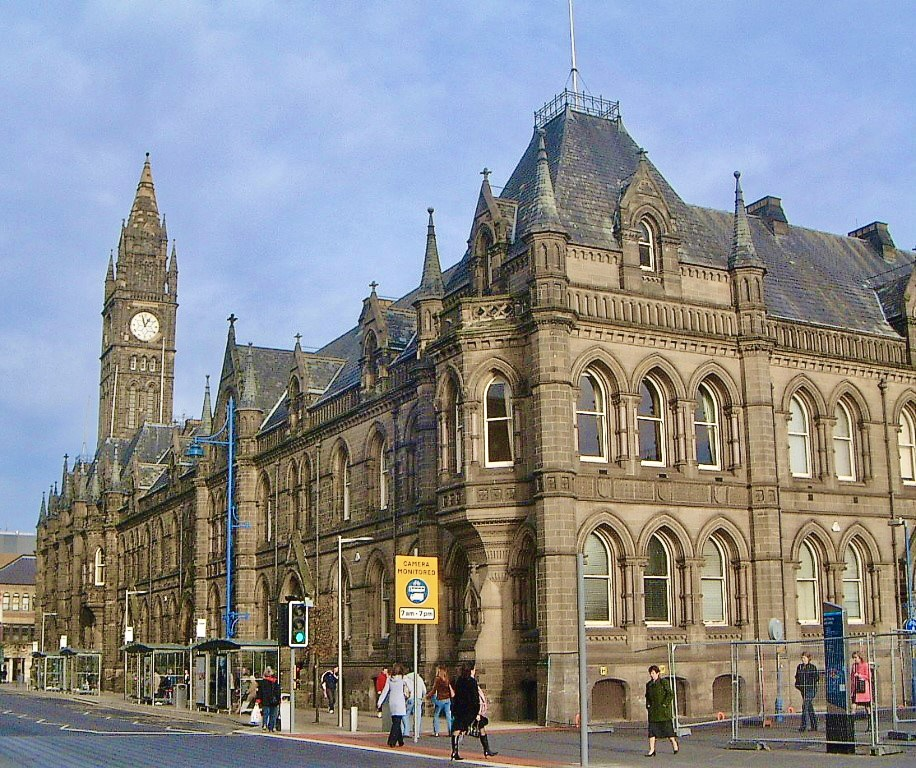
Middlesbrough Town Hall

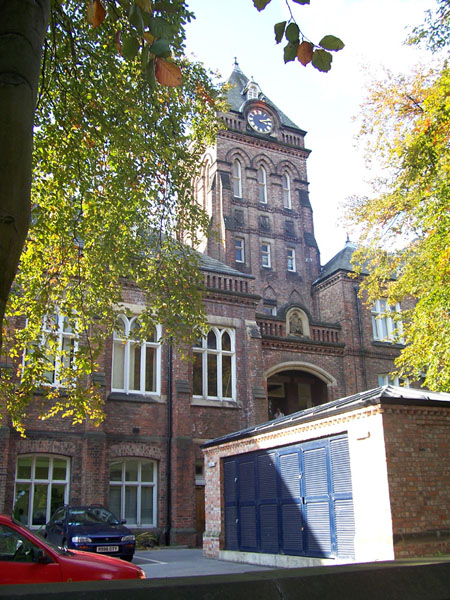
Queen Elizabeth Grammar School

George Gordon Hoskins FRIBA (28 October 1837 – 11 December 1911), was an English architect responsible for the design of several public buildings in the North East of England. His works include many large and important buildings – mansions, banks, hotels, hospitals, libraries, and schools.

"Gee-Gee" Hoskins was the eldest son of Francis Hoskins, an army officer, and his wife Julia Hill and was born in Birmingham at the end of 1837. He was the grandson of Abraham Hoskins who built the folly of Bladon Castle at Newton Solney and was brother-in law to the brewer Michael Bass. Hoskins' godmother was the Duchess of Gordon.

Hoskins studied Architecture in London and Paris and was a pupil of W D Haskoll of Westminster. In 1864 he moved to Darlington, and his first domestic commission that year was probably 15 and 16 Westbrook Villas. He became ARIBA on 3 June 1867 (proposed by P C Hardwick, A Waterhouse and J P Pritchett), and was based at Russell Street Buildings from 1867 to 1870. On 2 May 1870, Hoskins became an FRIBA proposed by T Oliver, J P Pritchett and J Ross. He made useful contacts with Quaker families which led to many commissions including Quaker houses at Woodburn and Elm Ridge, for John Pease in 1867. Extended Quaker connections outside the town led to commissions at the Temperance Hall at Hurworth, (1864), and the Victoria Hall in Sunderland, (1870), which was largely funded by the Backhouse family. He gained the role of architect to the banking house of Backhouse after designing a manager's house added to the Backhouse Bank in 1867. Following this he designed branches in Sunderland (1868), Bishop Auckland (1870), Middlesbrough (1875), Thirsk (1877) and Barnard Castle (1878). His major work was the Middlesbrough Town Hall and Municipal Buildings won in open competition in 1877, with construction starting in 1882. Alfred Waterhouse, R.A. acted as assessor, and the Prince and Princess of Wales opened the building in January 1889.

In Darlington, major works include the Queen Elizabeth Grammar School (1875-6), Bank Top board school (1882), the Pease Public Library (1884), rebuilding of the King's Head Hotel (1890-3), Greenbank Hospital (1885), Poor Law Offices (1896), the Technical College (1896-7), North of England School Furnishing Company, Blackwellgate (1897), and Rise Carr Board School (1902). He was for two years successively president of the Darlington School of Art and president of the Northern Architectural Association from 1886 to 1887. He was for some years a Conservative member of the Darlington Town Council and was also a JP. He was injured when the gunmaker's shop of Joseph Smythe exploded on 9 October 1894, destroying a substantial part of the town centre. Hoskins retired in 1907, passing the practice to his brother Walter Hoskins. GG Hoskins was almost entirely responsible for Victorian Darlington and his funeral was a solemn public occasion in the town. He was buried in the town's West Cemetery.

Hoskins lived at Darlington at Thornbeck House and later at Harewood Grove. He married twice, first to Isabel Matilda Robinson (1837-1862) the daughter of Joseph Robinson of Southend and they had two children. After Isabel's death he married Ann Hudson only child of William Hudson of Brough, Yorkshire. They had a son and four daughters. Both his sons became architects.

== Publications ==
- "Designs for Chimney Pieces" Darlington 1871
- "The Clerk of Works; a vade mecum for all engaged in the Superintendence of Building Operations" London 1876
- "An Hour with a Sewer Rat: or a few plain hints on House Drainage and Sewer Gases" London 1879

== Sources ==
- Obituary Builder v101, 15 Dec 1911, pp727–8
- Obituary RIBA Journal v 19, 1912, p 191.
