= New Welcome Lodge =

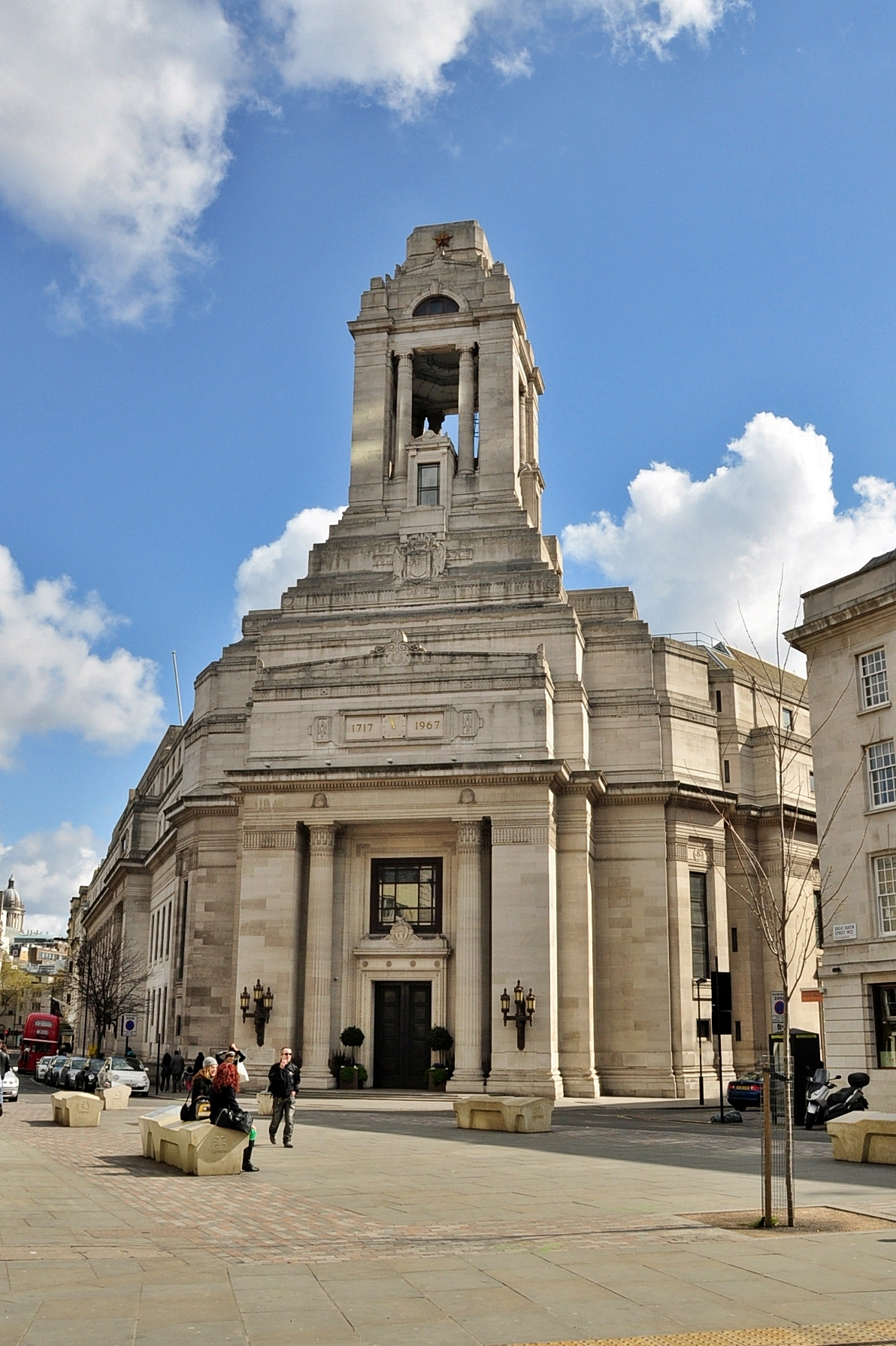
Freemasons' Hall, Great Queen Street

The New Welcome Lodge, No. 5139, is a British Masonic Lodge open to all men working in the Palace of Westminster. At its founding, membership was limited to Labour Party Members of Parliament, but its scope was broadened soon after. The lodge is alleged to have influenced the outcome of the 1935 labour leadership election.

== Founding and history ==
The lodge was consecrated in 1929, shortly before the formation in 1929 of the second Labour Government. Its founding was reported in a number of national newspapers including The Daily Telegraph, and Sporting Life. It was created at the suggestion of the then Prince of Wales, afterwards King Edward VIII, who was concerned by the antagonism between Freemasonry and the British left, and the fact that a number of Labour MPs were blackballed when applying to join Masonic lodges. The New Welcome Lodge was intended to form a link between Freemasonry and the new governing party, and was open to Labour MPs and for employees of trade unions and the Labour party; its members included Labour's deputy leader Arthur Greenwood. Hugh Dalton alleged that he had been approached to join the lodge, being told that the association was useful and that Greenwood (then deputy leader) was a member.

When the Parliamentary Labour Party was reduced in strength after its split at the 1931 general election over Ramsay MacDonald's formation of the National Government, numbers were reduced, and in 1934 membership was opened to all men working in the Palace of Westminster. Sir Walter Liddall was the first Conservative MP to be initiated in the lodge in 1937. By 1940, MPs from the three main parties were in the lodge and, since the Second World War, the membership of the lodge has been chiefly drawn from the staff of the Palace of Westminster.

Herbert Dunnico was Master of the New Welcome Lodge in 1931.

In 1989, the lodge was the subject of a House of Commons motion put down by the Labour member Max Madden, who stated that it was then meeting five times a year at Freemasons' Hall in London. In 1992 it was mentioned in parliament by Chris Mullin, who claimed that the members included Tony Baldry and Sir Gerard Vaughan.

== Alleged influence on 1935 Labour Party leadership elections ==
Herbert Morrison claimed that he was denied the leadership of the Labour Party in the 1935 election by the votes of Labour MPs who were members of New Welcome Lodge. Morrison's backer Hugh Dalton made similar claims, and went further than Morrison by claiming to have been shown the summons for the meeting at which the voting was decided. Dalton believed that the members of New Welcome Lodge backed Arthur Greenwood, who was a member of the lodge, and then backed Clement Attlee in order to block Morrison.
