= The Union Chapel Concert =

Live album by Guy Evans and Peter Hammill
- Released: March 1997
- Recorded: 3 November 1996
- Genre: Art rock
- Producer: Peter Hammill, Guy Evans

Professional ratings
Review scores
Source	Rating
Allmusic	4.5/5 stars

The Union Chapel Concert is a live album by Guy Evans and Peter Hammill, recorded in the Union Chapel in London, 3 November 1996, and released as a double CD in March 1997. The album is noteworthy because it is the first time the four ex-members of Van der Graaf Generator, Hammill, Evans, Hugh Banton and David Jackson, played together in front of a paying audience since the band had broken up in 1978. The subtitle on the front of the album reads: "featuring a one song, one-off reformation of Van der Graaf Generator." David Jackson and Hugh Banton were unannounced guests and played a Soundbeam-medley and a Samuel Barber Adagio for strings on the church organ respectively. All songs that evening were played in varying line-ups. Only "Lemmings" was played by Hammill, Evans, Banton and Jackson.

== Track listing ==
1. "Fireworks"
2. "A Forest of Pronouns"
3. "Anatol's Proposal"
4. "After the Show"
5. "Roger and Out"
6. "Accidents"
7. "Soundbeam Medley" (listed as "Four Kinds of Rice / Hello / Resolution" in the CD booklet but as "Soundbeam medley" on the back)
8. "Women of Ireland"
9. "Ship of Fools"
10. "Hamburg Station"
11. "Seven Wonders"
12. "Barber's Adagio for Strings"
13. "Red Shift"
14. "Lemmings"
15. "Traintime"

== Personnel ==
- Guy Evans – drums, percussion, MIDI pads & samples, blue drums
- Peter Hammill – guitar, keyboards
- Hugh Banton – organs
- Manny Elias – drums
- Stuart Gordon – violin
- David Jackson – saxophones, flutes, soundbeam
- Giles Perring (incorrectly spelled as 'Perrin' in the booklet of the CD) – guitar, blue drums
- Mat Fraser – blue drums
- Patou Soult – percussion, blue drums

Blue drums are the invention of Echo City, the group of which both Evans and Perring are members.
