= Edward Williams (composer) =

British composer (1921-2013)

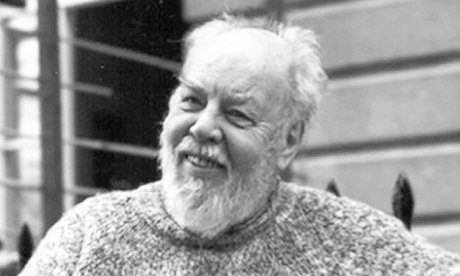
- Williams in 1999
- Born: Edward Aneurin Williams; 20 August 1921; Hindhead, Surrey, England
- Died: 8 December 2013 (aged 92); Bristol, England
- Spouse: Judith Swingler
- Children: 4

Edward Aneurin Williams (20 August 1921 – 8 December 2013) was a British composer and electronic music pioneer, best known for his work on the BBC Television series Life on Earth, and as the creator of Soundbeam. Two of the documentaries he composed scores for were Academy Award winners, including Dylan Thomas (1961), which won an Oscar in 1963, and Wild Wings (1965), which won an Oscar in 1967.

== Early life and education ==
Although of Welsh descent, Edward Williams was born in Hindhead, Surrey. His father Iolo Aneurin Williams was a poet, journalist, folk song collector and politician, and his American mother Francion Elinor Dixon was the musical daughter of a Colorado cattle rancher. He was the grandson of Liberal politician Aneurin Williams, the nephew of politician Ursula Williams, and a descendant of the Welsh poet Iolo Morganwg. Williams was initially educated at Rugby School, and later went on to read Languages at Trinity College, Cambridge. He then served in the Royal Navy during World War II, working on minesweeping vessels.

In 1946 Williams studied under (and worked as an assistant for) conductor and director of film music Muir Mathieson, and later with Ralph Vaughan Williams. He was also a friend and protégé of Alan Rawsthorne.

== Career ==
His career as British documentary composer began in 1948, and his many scores included 24 shorts for British Transport Films alone, including Open House (1951 – promoting the use of London Transport bus services to country houses), and one of the most famous of them, 1957's Journey into Spring, directed by Ralph Keene and portraying the arrival of spring in Selborne. Another was Wild Wings (1965), a look at the conservation work carried out by The Wildfowl & Wetlands Trust at its headquarters in Slimbridge, Gloucestershire. It won an Oscar for Best Short Subject at the 39th Academy Awards.

From the 1960s, Williams composed the scores for various dramas and documentaries, often with Welsh subject matter. They included the Oscar-winning documentary short Dylan Thomas (1961) directed by Jack Howells (a frequent collaborator) and narrated by Richard Burton, and the science fiction film Unearthly Stranger (1964) for Independent Artists, directed by John Krish.

Williams also lectured on music at the University of Bristol, where he developed his interest in electronic music. He became a pioneer user of analogue synthesisers, notably using the EMS VCS 3, three of which were used by his 1970s touring band, Uncle Jambo's Pendular Vibrations.

=== Life on Earth ===
The BBC's Life On Earth documentary, first broadcast in 1979, heralded a new genre of nature programming, and the avant-garde and pioneering music was pivotal to the programme's impact. It featured VCS 3 synthesisers alongside flute, harp, clarinet, strings, percussion, providing an evocative counterpoint to the visuals and David Attenborough's commentary. Williams and his orchestra intricately crafted the music scene-by-scene to reflect the imagery on-screen. In one sequence examining the flight of birds, the instrumentation mirrors each new creature's appearance. A private recording of just 100 copies was produced on vinyl in 1979, but a commercial release had to await the interest of Jonny Trunk of Trunk Records, who issued the first commercially available recording in 2009.

During the composition for Life on Earth, Williams mentored the film composer Martin Kiszko who then assisted him. (William Goodchild was a subsequent assistant). Following its success, Williams worked on the soundtrack for the three-part ecological series “Earth” for Thames Television and a series of Channel 4 television biographies of Goya, Gillray, Mary Wollstonecraft and Pushkin.

=== Soundbeam ===
In 1984 he commissioned the design of Soundbeam, an ultrasonic movement-to-MIDI converter which enables electronic instruments to be played from a distance by body movements in an ultrasonic beam. This has proven particularly useful in schools for children with special needs. Soundbeam has continued to be successful and remains in use worldwide.

== Later activities ==
In 1992, Williams composed and published Landscapes, a three movement trio for horn, violin and piano. It was first performed in October 1997 by the Bristol Ensemble with Donald Clist (horn), Roger Huckle (violin) and Susan Bird (piano).

In 1995, Williams won the BAFTA Cymru award for best original score for the BBC/S4C series Excalibur: The Search for Arthur. In 1996 he collaborated with horn player Pip Eastop with an Arts Council research development grant to explore "the possibilities of controlling computer-driven transformation of sound during live, partially improvised performance".

His music from the 1957 documentary Journey Into Spring was re-fashioned into A Selborne Suite for chamber ensemble and narrator (with words by Laurie Lee), and was first performed in 2003.

== Personal life ==
Williams was married to Judith Swingler, daughter of the poet Randall Swingler and the pianist Geraldine Peppin. Williams died in Bristol on 8 December 2013 age 92, after a short illness. His wife Judith died in 2022. There were four children - Simon, Bella, Nye and Caroline - and eight grandchildren. He was a keen sailor, owning a Wayfarer sailing dinghy, and had built Optimist dinghies.

== Family tree ==
Iolo Morganwg (Edward Williams); 1747–1826
Taliesin ab Iolo (Taliesin Williams); 1787–1847
Edward Williams; 1826–1886
Aneurin Williams; 1859–1924	Penry Williams; 1866–1945
Iolo Aneurin Williams; 1890–1962
Edward Williams; 1921–2013
