= Middlesbrough Town Hall =

Building in North Yorkshire, England

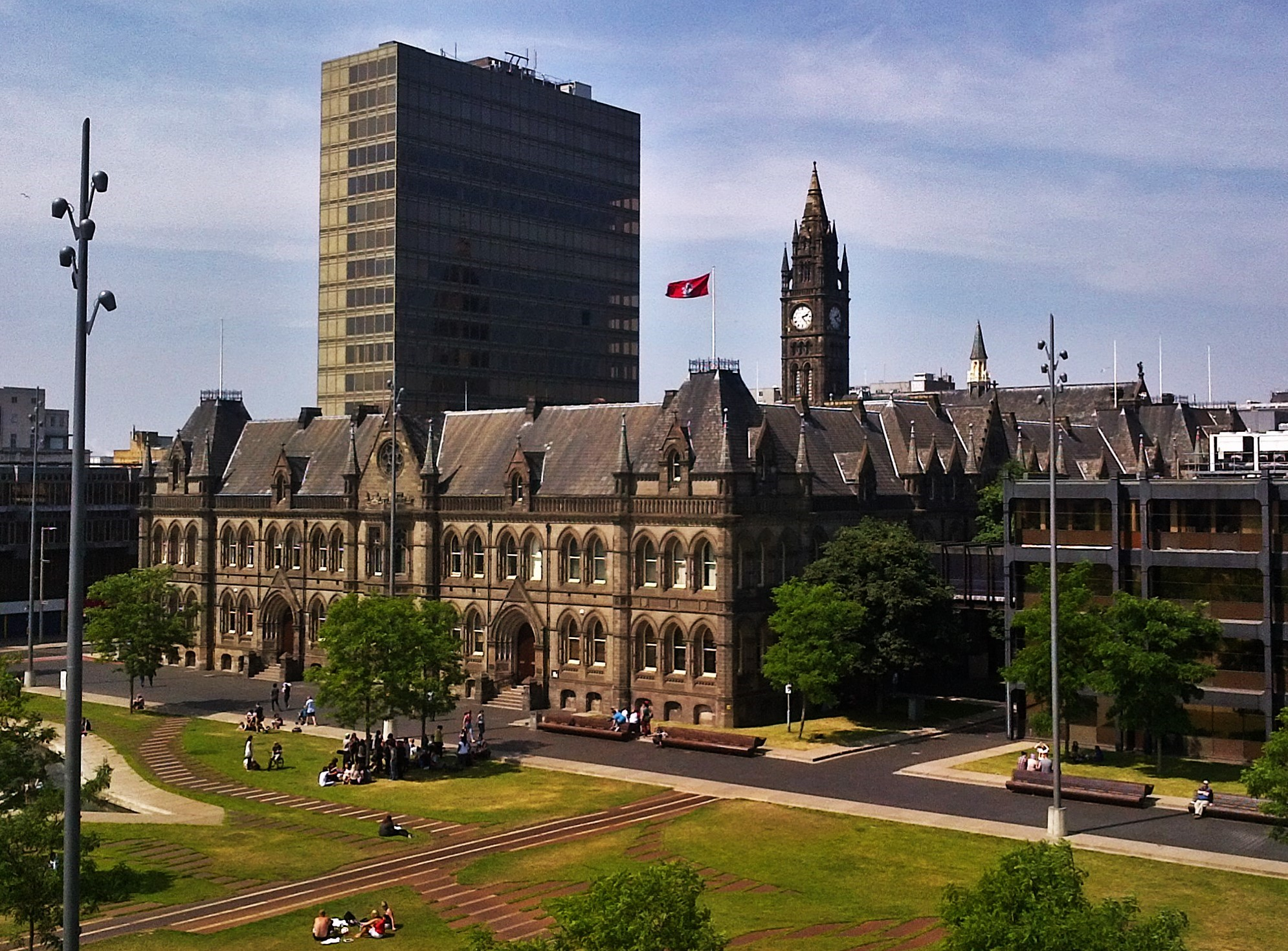

- Location within North Yorkshire
- 54°34′33.8″N 1°14′02.5″W
- Location: Middlesbrough

History
- Built: 1889

Site notes
- Architect: George Gordon Hoskins
- Architectural style: French Gothic

Listed Building – Grade II*
- Designated: 17 July 1968
- Reference no.: 1136659

Middlesbrough Town Hall is in Albert Road in Middlesbrough, North Yorkshire, England. It is a Grade II* listed building.

== History ==
The current building was commissioned to replace the Old Town Hall in the Market Place in the St Hilda's part of the town. After population growth, largely associated with the steel industry, Middlesbrough became a municipal borough in 1853 and civic leaders decided to procure a new town hall on open land in a developing area to the south of the Middlesbrough branch of the Stockton and Darlington Railway.

The foundation stone for the new building was laid in 1883. It was designed by George Gordon Hoskins of Darlington and built at a cost of £130,000. The official opening was performed by the Prince and Princess of Wales (later King Edward VII and Queen Alexandra) on 23 January 1889. The clock in the tower was manufactured by R. Richardson (of Sussex Street, Middlesbrough); it was set going by the Princess of Wales on the day of the official opening. The bells (one to strike the hours and four to chime the quarters) were by Taylor of Loughborough.

Queen Elizabeth II, accompanied by the Duke of Edinburgh, visited the town hall on 4 June 1956. Other visitors included the singer, David Bowie, who performed in the hall on 8 June 1972, and the heavy metal band, Iron Maiden, who performed at the town hall in 1980 and again in 1981.

The town hall also accommodated the local courtroom: the lack of dedicated judicial facilities in the town was temporarily resolved when a new law courts building (now referred to as Middlesbrough Magistrates' Court) was opened in Victoria Square in 1973. From 1 April 1974 to 1 April 1996 the Town Hall also served as the meeting place of Cleveland County Council.

A multimillion-pound plan to transform the town hall into a top class cultural and heritage venue was announced by Middlesbrough Council in 2015. Plans include an upmarket bar, coffee shop or restaurant with a glass atrium, a new multi-functional community room, new seating and toilets, lighting to illuminate the building at night and refurbishing of the theatre and crypt. Plans also include opening up parts of the building currently inaccessible to the public, including the Victorian courtroom, cells and fire station which would be made into heritage attractions in their own right. Work began in April 2016 with an expected 21 month timeframe required to complete the work. The refurbishment was completed in March 2018 ahead of re-opening in May 2018.

== Architecture ==
The building is of sandstone ashlar with slate roofs, built around four sides of a courtyard with the main town hall on the north side. As well as offices and conference rooms, it contains a still intact, fully restored courtroom and a sizeable theatre. The basement crypt also serves as a concert hall. It is built in a revived "French Gothic" style, with courtyard elevations in a "Domestic Revival" style. It was one of the last large Gothic style town halls to be built in England, towards the end of the 19th century. The town hall element has one storey centre with two-storey end pavilions. The building features statuary by W. Margeston of Chelsea. To the east are a complex of modern civic buildings linked by a bridge passage.

Middlesbrough Town Hall has a 1,190-seat theatre with a proscenium stage and balcony seating. It presents a well-preserved example of a Victorian concert hall: it features an organ with four manuals which was designed and built by William Hill & Sons in 1898. There is a second concert hall, known as the Crypt, which is beneath the main theatre hall. It contains a large bar, catering outlet and capacity for up to 600.
