= Taliesin Williams =

Welsh poet (1787–1847)

Taliesin Williams (bardic name Taliesin ab Iolo or Ab Iolo; 9 July 1787 – 16 February 1847) was a Welsh poet and author, and son of the notable Iolo Morganwg.

He was born in Cardiff, went to school in Cowbridge, and became an assistant teacher at a boarding school run by Reverend David Davies in Neath. He gradually took over leading the proceedings of regional Gorseddau from 1814, when he was awarded the title of Druid. He worked as a stonemason with his father in 1815. In 1816 he opened a school in Merthyr Tydfil, where he worked as a schoolmaster until the end of his life. He assisted with the publication of his father's work Cyfrinach Beirdd Ynys Prydain ("Mystery of the bards of the island of Britain") in 1829.

In 1834 he won the bardic chair at the Cardiff Eisteddfod with an awdl entitled Y Derwyddon (The Druids). In 1838 he won the bardic crown at the Abergavenny Eisteddfod for an essay on the Coelbren y Beirdd (the alleged bardic alphabet) which was published in 1840, defending the authenticity of his father's work.

On his father's death he was left his father's archive of manuscripts, which he believed were all genuine. After much work compiling and editing 26 volumes, a selection was published in 1848 under the title of the Iolo Manuscripts by the Welsh Manuscripts Society. Much of Taliesin's work was based on that of his father.

After his death in 1847 he was succeeded as Archdruid by Evan Davies (Myfyr Morganwg).

== Family tree ==
Iolo Morganwg (Edward Williams); 1747–1826
Taliesin ab Iolo (Taliesin Williams); 1787–1847
Edward Williams; 1826–1886
Aneurin Williams; 1859–1924	Penry Williams; 1866–1945
Iolo Aneurin Williams; 1890–1962
Edward Williams; 1921–2013
