= Bladon Castle =

Folly in Newton Solney, Derbyshire, England

Coordinates: 52.8226°N 1.6009°W

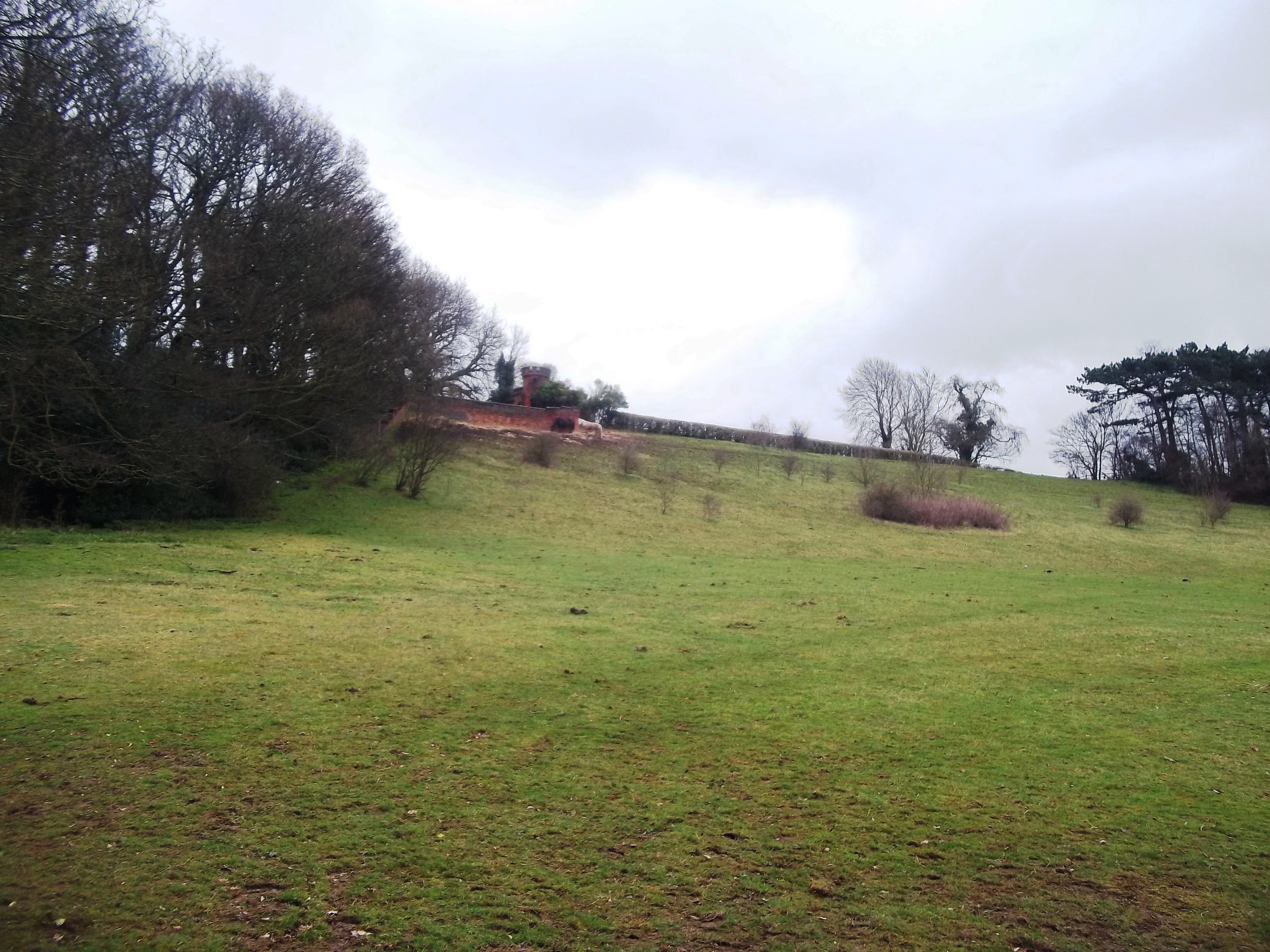
A glimpse of Bladon Castle taken from a field gate on Newtown Road and shows the crest of Bladon Hill where an end turret and connecting parapet wall can be seen

Bladon Castle is a folly, partly converted into a country house, located some 600 yards (550 m) southwest of the village of Newton Solney in South Derbyshire, 1 mile (1.6 km) northeast of Burton-on-Trent and close to the point at which the River Trent forms the boundary with Staffordshire.

The castle was originally built as a folly in a Neo-Gothic style by the architect Jeffrey Wyattville for Abraham Hoskins of Burton-on-Trent, grandfather of George Gordon Hoskins. Designed to give the appearance of a large castle with battlements, the structure was in reality little more than a single long wall.

It was subsequently partly converted into a house. The building lies within the grounds of Bladon House School, and is now in a semi-ruinous state.
