= Middlesbrough (disambiguation) =

Middlesbrough is a large town, in the north east of England.

Middlesbrough and its variants Middlesborough, Middlesboro and Middlesbro may also refer to:

== Places ==
- Middlesboro, Kentucky, US, former spelling was Middlesborough
- Borough of Middlesbrough, a district of North Yorkshire
- Middlesbrough Rural District, in the North Riding of Yorkshire, England, from 1894 to 1932
- Middlesbrough railway station, serving the town of Middlesbrough, England

== Meteorites ==
- Middlesboro crater, a Permian period meteorite crater in Kentucky, United States
- Middlesbrough meteorite, a meteorite which fell in Middlesbrough, England, in 1881

== Sport ==
- Middlesbrough F.C., an English association football club
- Middlesbrough Futsal Club, an English futsal club
- Middlesbrough Cricket Club, an English cricket club
- Middlesbrough W.F.C., an English association football club
- Middlesbrough RUFC, an English rugby union football club
- Middlesbrough Bears, an English speedway team from 1939 until 1996
- Middlesbrough Ironopolis F.C., an English association football club from 1889 to 1894

== United Kingdom Parliament ==
- Middlesbrough (UK Parliament constituency), a borough constituency in the House of Commons
- Middlesbrough South and East Cleveland (UK Parliament constituency), a constituency in the House of Commons
- Middlesbrough East (UK Parliament constituency), a former parliamentary constituency
- Middlesbrough West (UK Parliament constituency), a former parliamentary constituency

== See also ==
- Middlesbrough during World War II
- Middleborough, Massachusetts
