= The Elstree Story =

1952 British documentary film by Gilbert Gunn

Elstree Story
- Directed by: Gilbert Gunn
- Screenplay by: Gilbert Gunn; Jack Howells
- Produced by: Gilbert Gunn
- Edited by: Richard Best
- Music by: Philip Green
- Production company: Associated British Picture Corporation
- Release date: 5 December 1952 (UK)
- Running time: 61 minutes
- Country: United Kingdom
- Language: English

The Elstree Story is a 1952 documentary film directed by Gilbert Gunn, covering the output of Elstree Studios from 1928 to 1952. It was written by Gunn and Jack Howells.

== Synopsis ==
Narrated by Richard Todd, Elstree Story documents the films produced at Elstree Studios, Borehamwood, UK, from the first in 1928 (The White Sheik, a.k.a. King's Mate), through to 1952.

It includes excerpts from over forty productions, including Alfred Hitchcock’s Blackmail (1929), the first full-length British talking picture. There is also behind-the-scenes footage and rare clips of studio stars such as Will Hay, Charles Laughton, Margaret Lockwood, James Mason, John Mills, Laurence Olivier and Googie Withers.

== Cast ==
- Richard Todd – host / narrator
- Monty Banks – self
- Jack Buchanan – self
- Kenneth Connor – voice

== Releases ==
The film was released on DVD by Network in 2013.
