= Jack Howells =

Welsh film director (1913–1990)

Thomas John Howells (July 1913 – 6 September 1990) was a Welsh film-maker, who is best remembered for his 1962 documentary Dylan Thomas (also known as A Tribute to Dylan Thomas), the only Welsh film to have won an Academy Award, for Documentary Short Subject in 1963.

== Career ==
Howells was born in Abertysswg near Rhymney and was a school teacher before switching to film-making, working within the Pathe Documentary Unit before going freelance. He wrote around 30 documentaries during the course of his career, and from the 1960s produced work for HTV, including Return To Rhymney (1972) and Penclawdd Wedding (1974). A frequent musical collaborator was Edward Williams.

Although best known for his impressionistic and lyrical documentaries, he also wrote screenplays for around 30 non-TV feature films, including Front Page Story (1953) and Skid Kids (1953).

== Selected filmography ==
- Cricket (1950) – scriptwriter
- Elstree Story (1952) – writer
- We live by the river (1955) - director
