= Front Page Story =

1954 film

- British theatrical poster
- Directed by: Gordon Parry
- Screenplay by: Jack Howells; Jay Lewis
- Based on: Final Night by Robert Gaines
- Produced by: Jay Lewis
- Starring: Jack Hawkins; Elizabeth Allan; Eva Bartok; Derek Farr
- Cinematography: Gilbert Taylor
- Edited by: Bill Lewthwaite
- Music by: Jackie Brown
- Production company: Jay Lewis Productions
- Distributed by: British Lion Films
- Release date: 20 January 1954
- Running time: 99 minutes
- Country: United Kingdom
- Language: English
- Box office: £132,269 (UK)

Front Page Story (also known as Behind the Headlines) is a 1954 British drama film directed by Gordon Parry and starring Jack Hawkins, Elizabeth Allan and Eva Bartok. It was written by Jack Howells and Jay Lewis.

== Plot ==
Grant is a hard working Fleet Street newspaper editor who refuses to take a long planned holiday with his wife, Susan. Instead, to her annoyance, he stays in his office to deal with a number of urgent stories. These include a family of children evicted from their home when their mother dies, a woman charged with euthanasia, and a drunken ex-reporter tracking down an atomic scientist. They all culminate in the story of a plane crash, after which Grant is shocked to find his wife listed as one of the passengers. He discovers Susan was leaving him and going away with one of his colleagues. But did she take the plane?

== Cast ==
- Jack Hawkins as Grant
- Elizabeth Allan as Susan Grant
- Eva Bartok as Mrs. Thorpe
- Derek Farr as Teale
- Michael Goodliffe as Kennedy
- Martin Miller as Dr. Brukmann
- Walter Fitzgerald as Black
- Patricia Marmont as Julie
- Joseph Tomelty as Dan
- Jenny Jones as Jenny
- Stephen Vercoe as Craig
- Helen Haye as Susan's mother
- Michael Howard as Barrow
- John Stuart as Counsel for the Prosecution
- Bruce Beeby as Counsel for the Defence
- Guy Middleton as Gentle
- Ronald Adam as editor
- Henry Mollison as Lester

== Production ==
It was shot in black-and-white at Shepperton Studios with some location shooting in London. The film's sets were designed by the art director Arthur Lawson.

== Critical reception ==
The Monthly Film Bulletin wrote: "This film, obviously intended to be something more than "just another newspaper story ", attempts to combine some pleasantly caustic comments on the ethics of journalism with several narrative threads concocted by its team of writers, which regrettably fall back on well-worn conventions. The characterisation of Grant would have been more successful, perhaps, if he had been given fewer unnatural responsibilities to bear, although Jack Hawkins carries the part with his customary doggedness. ...The London locations are well used, but Gordon Parry's direction, although conventionally efficient, lacks real drive and style."

The New York Times critic wrote, "there's nothing wrong with the point of this picture. It just doesn't make it well."

TV Guide found it "a lucid look behind the headlines at the people who get out the news."

Radio Times magazine call the film it "cosily dated, but an interesting sign of its times."
