= Soundbeam =

Interactive MIDI hardware and software

- Original author(s): Edward Williams
- Developer(s): The Soundbeam Project / EMS
- Initial release: 1989
- Stable release: Soundbeam 6 / 2017
- Operating system: Linux
- Type: Special needs education, art installations
- License: Proprietary
- Website: http://www.soundbeam.co.uk/

Soundbeam is an interactive MIDI hardware and software system developed by The Soundbeam Project / EMS in which movement within a series of ultrasonic beams is used to control multimedia hardware and software.

== System ==
Soundbeam uses a combination of ultrasound (sonar) and tangible (foot controller) inputs to generate MIDI messages. The sonar uses 50 kHz signals.

The latest version SOUNDBEAM 6 incorporates many of the features of both soundbeam 2 - 5. It has a full touchscreen interface, inbuilt sampling, inbuilt high quality sounds, inbuilt mini keyboard - it comes with a wide and varied sample / sound library and with 37 preset soundsets for immediate musical composition and performance. It now also includes film that is embedded with each Soundset and you can also add your own film. The film is triggered by the switches.

=== Version history ===
Release	Dates	Status
Soundbeam 1	1989-1998	Discontinued
Soundbeam 2	1998-2010	Discontinued
Desktop Soundbeam	2003-2012	Discontinued
Soundbeam 5	2010-2016	Discontinued
Soundbeam 6	2017–present	In production

== Implementation ==
Originally designed by Edward Williams for the production of avant-garde dance music, Soundbeam has been used primarily in the field of special needs education due to the minimal physical movement required for its operation. David Jackson's Tonewall project has utilized Soundbeam since 1992. Jackson and others performed a "Soundbeam Medley" (listed as "Four Kinds of Rice / Hello / Resolution" in the CD booklet) on the Guy Evans and Peter Hammill The Union Chapel Concert 1997 live album.

Due to the system's ability for expansion with four sensors and eight switches, installations have included DAW synchronization (such as with Reason or Ableton), as well as live video manipulation.
