= Wild Wings =

1966 British film by Patrick Carey and John Taylor

- Directed by: Patrick Carey; John Taylor
- Written by: Ralph Keene; Peter Scott
- Produced by: Edgar Anstey; John Legard
- Starring: Peter Scott
- Cinematography: Patrick Carey
- Edited by: John Legard
- Music by: Edward Williams
- Distributed by: British Transport Films
- Release date: 1966
- Running time: 34 minutes
- Country: United Kingdom
- Language: English

Wild Wings is a 1966 British short documentary film directed by Patrick Carey and John Taylor and produced by British Transport Films. In 1966, it won an Oscar for Best Short Subject at the 39th Academy Awards.

== Summary ==
The film looks at the conservation work carried out by The Wildfowl & Wetlands Trust at its headquarters in Slimbridge, Gloucestershire, England.

== Cast ==
- Peter Scott as narrator
