= Ursula Williams =

British politician

Williams, c. 1923

Helen Ursula Williams BEM (1896 – November 1979), was a British Liberal Party politician who legally stood for Parliament even though she was too young to vote.

== Background ==
She was the daughter of Liberal MP, Aneurin Williams and Helen Elizabeth Pattinson. Her brother was Iolo Aneurin Williams. She was awarded the British Empire Medal. Her nephew was the composer Edward Williams.

== Politics ==
Her introduction to politics came from having campaigned for her father at Consett in 1918 and 1922. In 1923 at the age of 27 she was selected as Liberal candidate, in succession to her father, for the Consett Division of Durham at the 1923 General Election. This put her in an anomalous position. Since 1918, under the Parliament (Qualification of Women) Act 1918, women over 21 were allowed to stand for parliament. However, in 1923 only women over the age of 30 were allowed to vote. So Williams could ask people to vote for her even though she was not allowed to vote for herself. Up to this point, she was the youngest woman to have ever stood for parliament. Having such a young woman as a parliamentary candidate attracted a lot of media attention, not least after an exchange at one of her public meetings. She was interrupted by a man who demanded "Oh, what do you know?" "Many things" replied Williams. "Well, how many ribs has a pig got?" asked her heckler. "I don't know offhand" retorted Williams, "but if the gentleman will step up on the platform I will be glad to count them." Despite achieving a swing of 5.4% she was unable to unseat the Labour candidate who had defeated her father in 1922.

General Election 1923: Consett Electorate 38,989
Party	Candidate	Votes	%	±%
Labour	Herbert Dunnico	15,862	52.0	+5.5
Liberal	Helen Ursula Williams	14,619	48.0	+16.2
Majority		1,243	4.0	10.7
Turnout			78.2	
Labour hold		Swing	-5.4	

She did not stand for Parliament again though she continued her political involvement inside the Liberal Party. In 1924, she was elected to the Executive Committee of the Women's Liberal Federation. In 1925 she served as Honorary Treasurer of the London Young Liberal Federation. In 1926 she became a leading Liberal party advocate of birth control in welfare centres. She took a particular interest in Proportional Representation and was a member of the Proportional Representation Society.

Her brother Iolo Aneurin Williams was also involved in politics as Liberal candidate for Chelsea in 1924 and 1929.

She died in 1979 at the age of 83.
