= Peace Negotiation Committee =

The Peace Negotiation Committee was formed in 1916 to call for a truce with Germany by the future Labour MP Herbert Dunnico.
