= Herbert Dunnico =

British minister, Freemason and politician

Reverend Sir Herbert Dunnico

Deputy Chairman of Ways and Means
- In office 3 July 1929 – 27 October 1931
- Speaker: Edward Fitzroy
- Preceded by: Dennis Herbert
- Succeeded by: Robert Bourne

Member of Parliament for Consett
- In office 15 November 1922 – 27 October 1931
- Preceded by: Aneurin Williams
- Succeeded by: John Dickie

Personal details
- Born: 2 December 1875 Wales, UK
- Died: 2 October 1953 (aged 77)
- Party: Labour (–1935); National Labour (1935–1945)
- Education: University College Nottingham

Reverend Sir Herbert Dunnico (2 December 1875 – 2 October 1953) was a British Baptist minister, leading Freemason and Labour Party politician.

== Early life ==
Born in Wales, he started work in a factory aged ten, but studied in his spare time and won a scholarship to University College Nottingham. He was ordained as a Baptist minister in Warrington and Liverpool, and became president of the Liverpool Free Church Council.

== Political career ==
He formed the Peace Negotiation Committee in 1916 to call for a truce with Germany.

A committed socialist, he was elected at the 1922 general election as member of parliament (MP) for Consett. From 1929 to 1931 he was Deputy Speaker of the House of Commons, and Chairman of Ways and Means.

Dunnico also holds the distinction of being the Labour Party's first backbench rebel, when on 21 February 1924 he became the first Labour MP ever to vote against a Labour government. The vote was on the First Labour Government's programme of building light cruisers, to which Dunnico (a former secretary of the Peace Society) objected because he feared the start of an arms race, and because believed that the Parliamentary Labour Party had not been properly consulted.

At the 1931 general election, he was defeated in Consett by the Liberal National candidate John Dickie. In January 1935 Dunnico announced that he felt it his duty to support the National Government because he felt political partisanship was damaging to the national interest. He was National Labour candidate at Wednesbury at the 1935 general election but narrowly failed to win election.

== Freemasonry ==
Dunnico was involved in founding the New Welcome Lodge No. 5139, which was consecrated in 1929, shortly before the formation in 1929 of the second Labour Government. It was created at the suggestion of the then Prince of Wales, afterwards King Edward VIII, who was concerned by the antagonism between Freemasonry and the British left towards Freemasonry.

The New Welcome Lodge was intended to form a link between Freemasonry and the new governing party, and was open to Labour MPs and for employees of trade unions and the Labour party; its members included Labour's deputy leader Arthur Greenwood. However, when the Parliamentary Labour Party was reduced in strength after its split at the 1929 general election over Ramsay MacDonald's formation of the National Government, numbers were reduced.

In 1934, membership was opened to all men working in the Palace of Westminster. Dunnico was Master of the New Welcome Lodge in 1931.

== Post politics ==
He was knighted in the New Year Honours 1938, "for political and public services".

From 1947 to 1953, Rev Dunnico was president of the Essex County Football Association.

Parliament of the United Kingdom
Preceded by Aneurin Williams	Member of Parliament for Consett; 1922–1931	Succeeded by John Dickie
