= Dylan Thomas (film) =

1962 British film by Jack Howells

- Directed by: Jack Howells
- Produced by: Jack Howells
- Starring: Richard Burton
- Cinematography: Harry Orchard; Hone Glendining
- Music by: Edward Williams
- Production company: Television Wales and the West
- Release date: 1962
- Running time: 30 minutes
- Country: United Kingdom
- Language: English

Dylan Thomas (also known as A Tribute to Dylan Thomas) is a 1962 British short black-and-white documentary film directed by Jack Howells about the Welsh poet and writer Dylan Thomas, narrated by Richard Burton.

== Cast ==
- Richard Burton as narrator

== Reception ==
The Monthly Film Bulletin wrote: "This amiable but rather old-fashioned film ... is an impressionistic account of the poet's world. Pastora [sic] memories, seascapes, villages, Swansea town, London pubs. Bits of Thomas' writings, and the commentary, are spoken by Richard Burton, who also appears in the film, sitting self-consciously in a pub or on a hillock with the wind blowing through his hair. The whole film approaches Dylan Thomas with a breathless hush which suggests that he was the patron saint of Wales rather than an interesting (and irreverent) minor poet."

Kine Weekly wrote: "Serious and successful tribute to the famous Welsh poet. The film won a documentary Oscar this year and well deserved it. The producer-director has avoided the temptation to be either effusive or arty, and his subject benefits by the restrained and intuitive description of Dylan Thoms, interwoven with quotations from his writings, beautifully spoken by Richard Burton, and matched with some really lovely use of shade and movement in the photography of seas, mountains, Swansea and Laugharne, the small Carmarthen village that the poet finally made his home. Dylan Thomas cannot fail in Wales and deserves to be appreciated everywhere."

== Accolades ==
The film won an Oscar at the 35th Academy Awards in 1963 for Documentary Short Subject. The Academy Film Archive preserved Dylan Thomas in 2000.
