= Iolo Aneurin Williams =

Captain Iolo Aneurin Williams (18 June 1890 – 18 January 1962), was a British journalist, author, poet, art historian, folk-song collector, amateur naturalist and Liberal Party politician. His son was the composer Edward Williams.

== Background ==
Williams was born in Middlesbrough, the son of Aneurin Williams, who was a Liberal member of parliament. He was the brother of Ursula Williams who was also a Liberal politician. He was educated at Rugby School and King's College, Cambridge.

== Folk song collecting ==
Williams began collecting folk songs in the area around his home in Hindhead in 1912. He would cycle around the countryside and make contact with potential sources, sometimes with the assistance of the local Vicar. Being unable to write down the tunes he collected only the words. When he had sufficient sets of words he would return with either Clive Carey or Frederick Keel who would note the tunes. His collecting ceased with the outbreak of the First World War. After the war he succeeded Frederick Keel as Honorary Secretary of the Folk Song Society.

== Military service ==
Williams began as a volunteer driver for the B.R.C.S (British Red Cross). He was given a temporary commission of Lieutenant in the West Yorkshire Regiment and was later promoted to Captain. The only record available is his Medal Index Card which does not give any dates.

== Professional career ==
Williams was Bibliographical Correspondent of the London Mercury from 1920–1939. In 1936 he joined the staff at the Times as art and museums correspondent. In 1926 he edited Sheridan’s plays, in 1927 he wrote ‘Elements of Book-Collecting’, in 1935 ‘English Folk Song and Dance’, in 1946 ‘Flowers of marsh and stream’ and his book ‘Early English water-colours’ was published in 1952. His first book of poetry was published in 1915 with his second in 1919. He made contributions to the Dictionary of National Biography and the Cambridge Bibliography of English Literature. He was a member of the Botanical Society of the British Isles for over 38 years and contributed articles to their journal. Elected a member of the Linnean Society of London in 1926. In 1944 he was vice-president of the Bibliographical Society, also honorary secretary of the Folk Song Society, and vice-president of the Zoological Society of London. He was proud of his Welsh ancestry; he served on the Council of the National Museum of Wales and on the Welsh Committee of the Arts Council. In 1960 was made an honorary member of the Gorsedd of Bards.

=== Publications ===
- Poems, 1915
- New Poems, 1919
- Byways Round Helicon, 1922
- Shorter Poems of the 18th Century, 1923
- Seven 18th Century Bibliographies, 1924
- Editor: plays of Sheridan, 1926
- Elements of Book-Collecting, 1927
- Poetry To-day, 1927
- Where the Bee Sucks, 1929 (illustrated by Katharine Cameron)
- The Firm of Cadbury, 1931
- Points in 18th Century Verse, 1934
- English Folk Song and Dance, 1935
- Flowers of Marsh and Stream (King Penguin), 1946
- Early English Water-Colours, 1952

== Political career ==
Williams was Liberal candidate for the Chelsea division of London at the 1924 General Election. Chelsea was a safe Unionist seat, so he was not expected to win. 1924 was not a good election for the Liberals and he came in third place in the race. Despite this, he contested Chelsea again at the 1929 General Election, a better election for the Liberals. He increased the Liberal share of the vote, but still finished third. He did not stand for parliament again.

=== Electoral record ===
General Election 1924: Chelsea
Party	Candidate	Votes	%	±%
Unionist	Rt Hon. Sir Samuel Hoare	13,816	65.68	+8.68
Labour	Dora Russell	5,661	26.01	−1.49
Liberal	Iolo Aneurin Williams	1,557	7.40	−8.11
Majority		8,155	38.77	+9.27
Turnout		29,582	71.10	+7.27
Unionist hold		Swing	+5.09	

General Election 1929: Chelsea
Party	Candidate	Votes	%	±%
Unionist	Rt Hon. Sir Samuel John Gurney Hoare	15,480	58.4	−7.2
Labour	Alfred George Prichard	6,645	25.1	−0.9
Liberal	Iolo Aneurin Williams	4,360	16.5	+9.1
Majority		8,835	33.4	−5.4
Turnout		41,945	63.1	−8.0
Unionist hold		Swing	-4.1	

== Personal life ==
In 1920 he married Francion Elinor Dixon (1894 – 1995) from Colorado. They had one son and two daughters.. He died at his home West Hall, a 17th century grade II listed building in Kew where they had lived since at least 1937; his widow lived there until 1973.

== Family tree ==
Iolo Morganwg (Edward Williams); 1747–1826
Taliesin ab Iolo (Taliesin Williams); 1787–1847
Edward Williams; 1826–1886
Aneurin Williams; 1859–1924	Penry Williams; 1866–1945
Iolo Aneurin Williams; 1890–1962
Edward Williams; 1921–2013

== See also ==
- Katharine Cameron
- Arthur St John Adcock
