= Middlehaven =

Area of Middlesbrough, North Yorkshire, England

Coordinates: 54.5825°N 1.2338°W

Middlehaven: St Hilda's, Over the Border, Old Middlesbrough
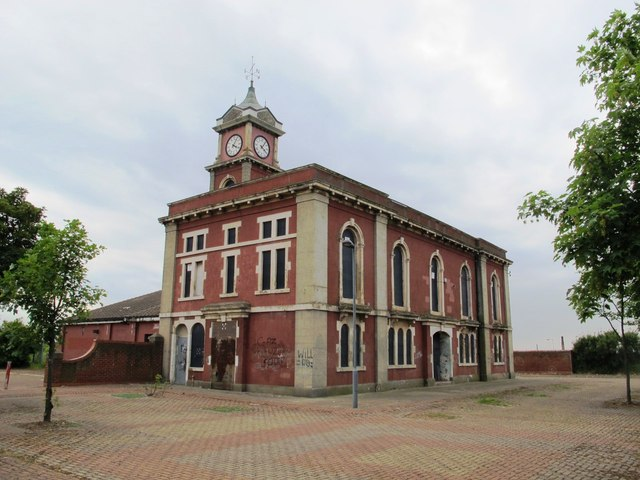
- The Old Town Hall

- Location within North Yorkshire
- OS grid reference: NZ496210
- Unitary authority: Middlesbrough
- Ceremonial county: North Yorkshire
- Region: North East
- Country: England
- Sovereign state: United Kingdom
- Post town: MIDDLESBROUGH
- Postcode district: TS2
- Dialling code: 01642
- Police: Cleveland
- Fire: Cleveland
- Ambulance: North East
- UK Parliament: Middlesbrough and Thornaby East

Middlehaven is the oldest part of Middlesbrough, North Yorkshire, England. It is directly south of the River Tees, and north of the current town centre, separated from it by the railway and A66.

The area has had waves of regeneration since post-war devastation. It currently includes, from west to east: a manufacturing and industrial sector, Boho Zone developments (residential and commercial), the Old Town Hall, the Transporter Bridge, Middlesbrough College, docks, and the Riverside Stadium.

The term St Hilda's for the area relates to the former priory, founded by Hilda of Whitby (the first mention of the town) and later also former church as named after the saint. The railway, and the much later-built A66, separating the area from the rest of the town created the term Over the Border for the area. The name Middlehaven is a back formation from Middlesbrough, combining "Middle" with "haven": the haven relates to Middlesbrough Dock.

== History ==
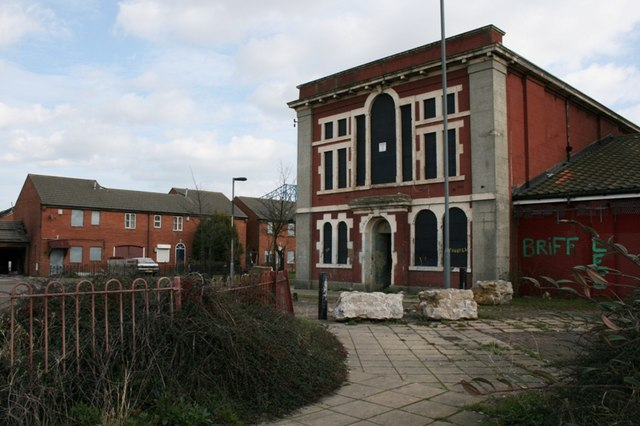
The 1970s estate of St. Hilda's in 2007

The area formed what was the original town centre of Middlesbrough after its foundation around 1830, and was originally known as St. Hilda's after the parish church of the same name. The district was eventually separated from the southward expansion of the town by the railway in 1846. The Old Town Hall was completed at that time.

By the 1930s, the area had become slums, with overcrowding and high crime, and demolitions begun despite protests from residents. Later, in the 1950s, the clearance continued with sweeping demolitions, and the replacement of the remaining homes by low-rise flat blocks.

Once again, beginning in 1969, there was another wave of demolition, this time replacing the 1950s flats with a suburban housing estate. In the regeneration, St. Hilda's church was demolished.

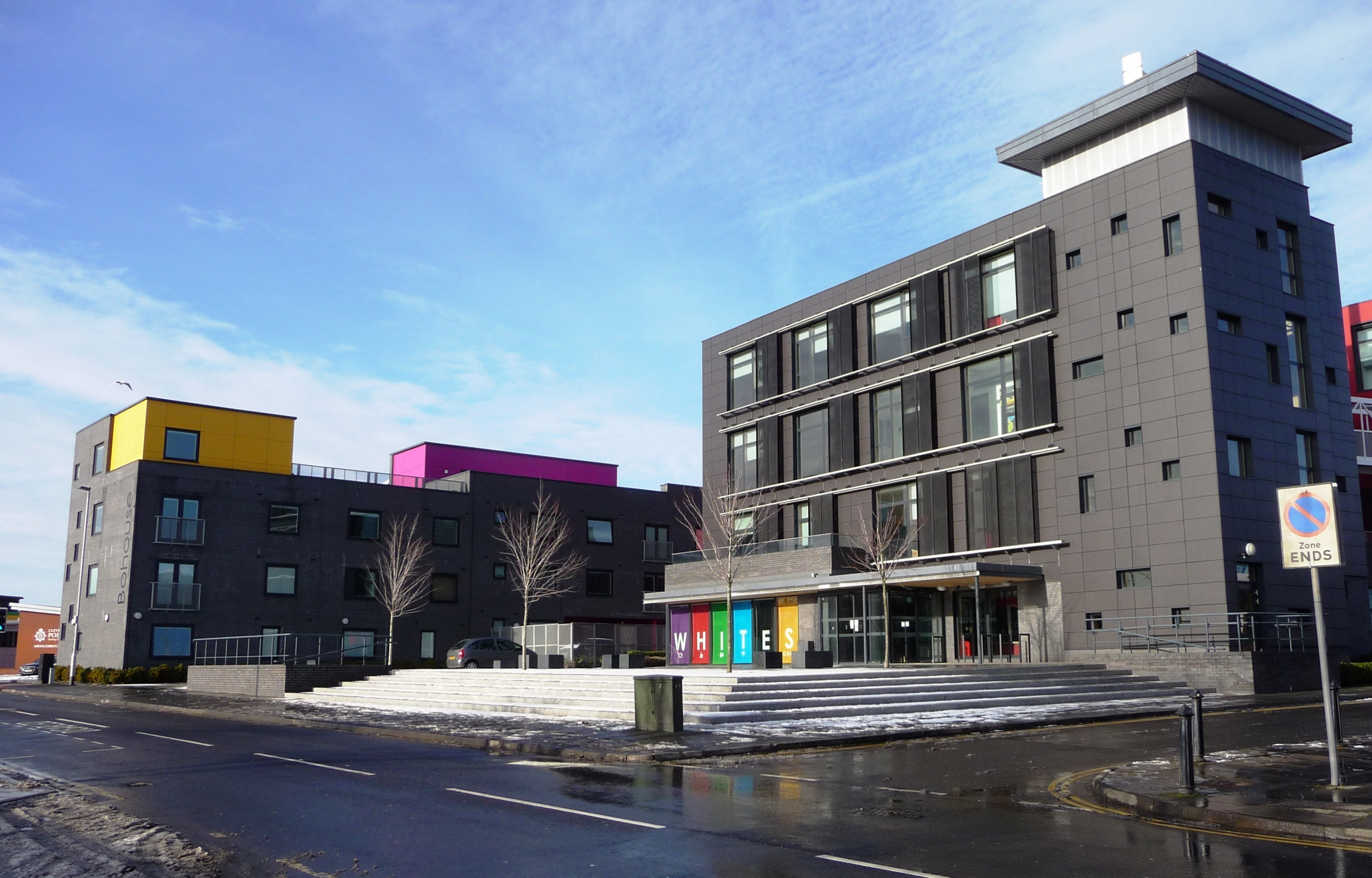
Bohouse (left) and Boho One (right)

In 2004, the homes were mostly vacant and plans were announced to demolish the estate, relocating the remaining 300 residents. In the following years, the site was levelled as new developments began in the area, and the area became known as Middlehaven.

== Middlesbrough Dock ==
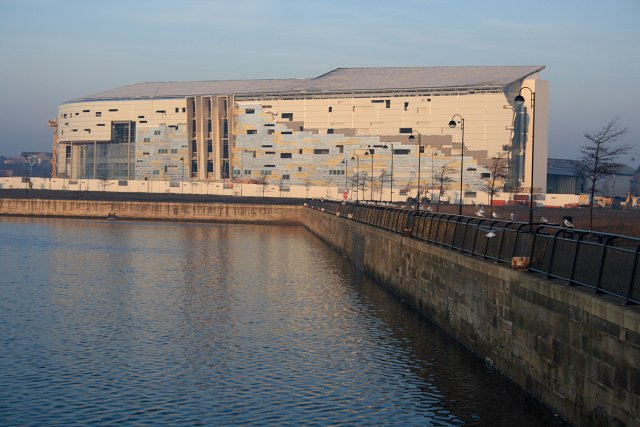
The dock and Middlesbrough College

The original dock for the 1830 Port Darlington development became too small within a decade of opening, and needed expanding. From 1839–42 under William Cubitt and George Turnbull's plans, the dock was expanded, and formally opened on the 12 May 1842. The dock was designed to have an 80 feet (24 m) entrance channel from the River Tees to the 1:4.4 rectangular dock. The dock was expanded multiple times, growing from 9 acres (0.036 km^{2}) in 1869 to 25 acres (0.10 km^{2}) in 1902.

769,000 long tons (781,000 t) of goods went through the dock in 1978, while the wider ports in the area (under the jurisdiction of Tees and Hartlepool Harbour Police) handled 33,000,000 long tons (34,000,000 t). The dock was unable to compete, and closed in 1980.

In 1994, the training ship Tovarisch was impounded at the dock for being unseaworthy. While moored, the ship was crewed by cadets from the Kherson State Maritime Academy (with crews replaced twice yearly). The Ukrainian sailors played in the local five-a-side football league during this time. The ship left on 29 August 1999 for restoration in Wilhelmshaven, Germany, under funding from the Tall Ships Friends charity and the Ukrainian government.

== Tees Valley Metro ==
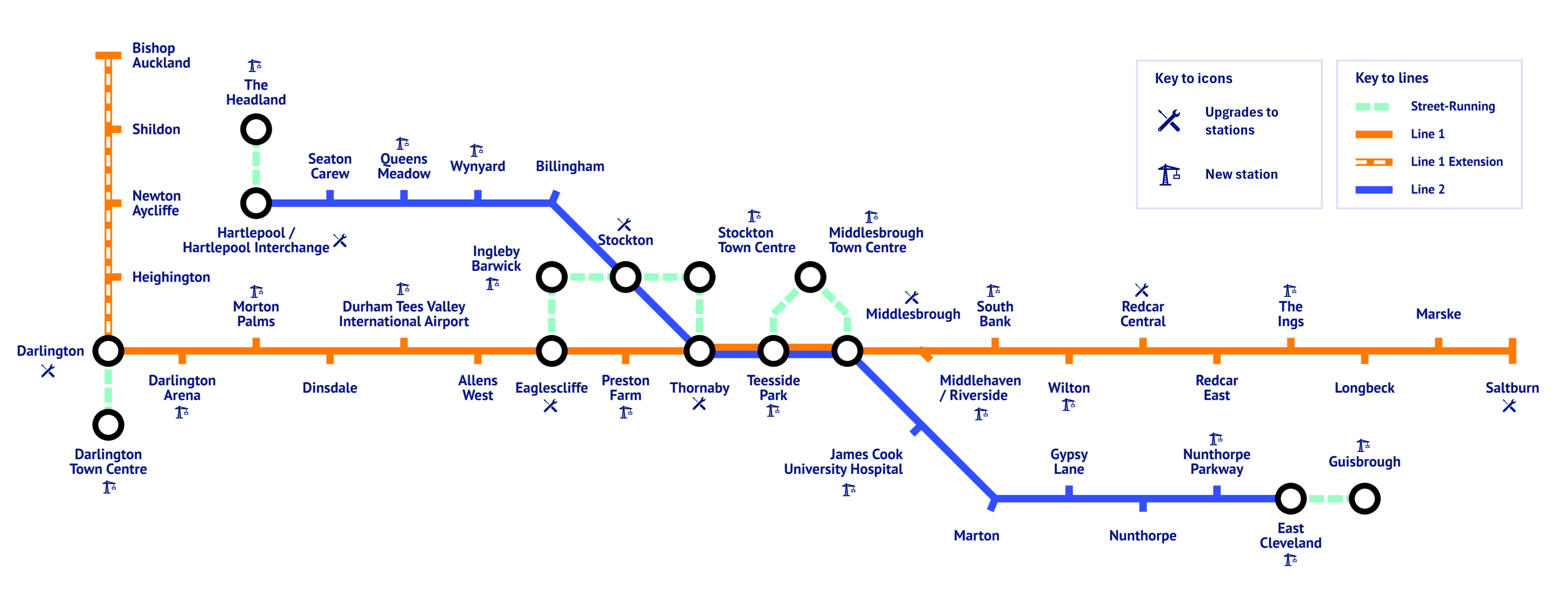
Transit diagram showcasing all discussed or mentioned ideas for the Tees Valley Metro.

Starting in 2006, Middlehaven was mentioned within the Tees Valley Metro scheme as a possible new station to better serve the Riverside Stadium. This was a plan to upgrade the Tees Valley Line and sections of the Esk Valley Line and Durham Coast Line to provide a faster and more frequent service across the North East of England. In the initial phases the services would have been heavy rail mostly along existing alignments with new additional infrastructure and rollingstock. The later phase would have introduced tram-trains to allow street running and further heavy rail extensions.

As part of the scheme, Markse station would have received improved service to Darlington and Saltburn (1–2 to 4 trains per hour) and new rollingstock. While never concrete or included in detailed plans, there was also mention of street-running trams being run within Middlesbrough town centre which may have run throughout Middlehaven.

However, due to a change in government in 2010 and the 2008 financial crisis, the project was ultimately shelved. Several stations eventually got their improvements and there is a possibility of improved rollingstock and services in the future which may affect Marske.

== Gallery ==
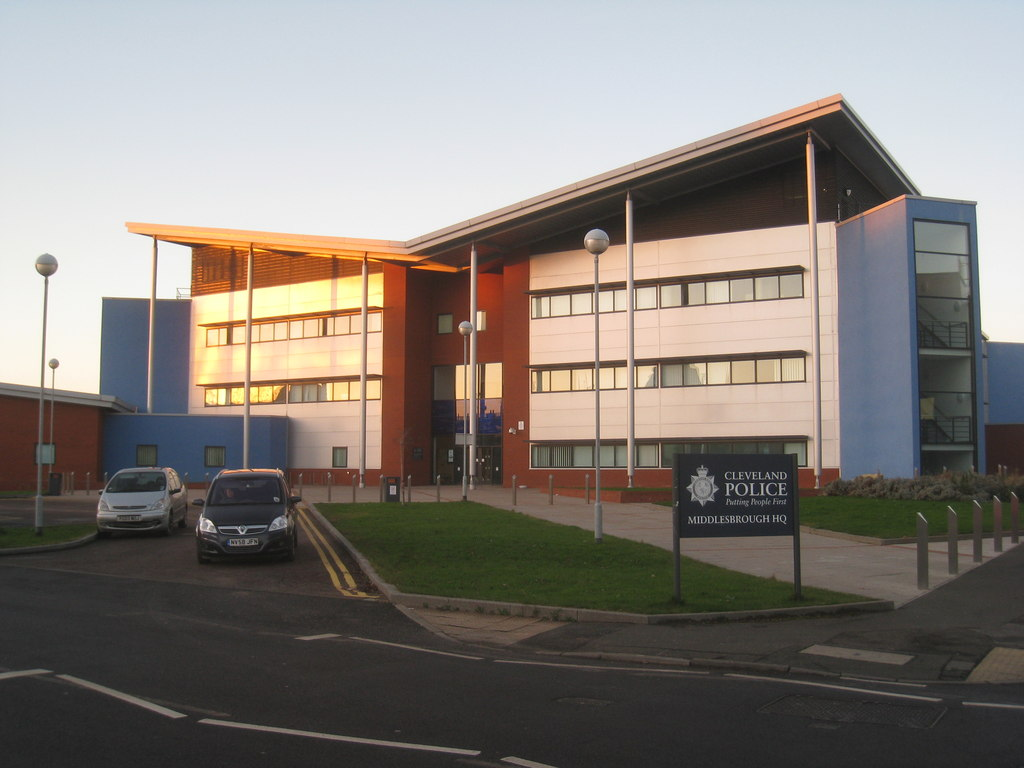
Cleveland Police headquarters

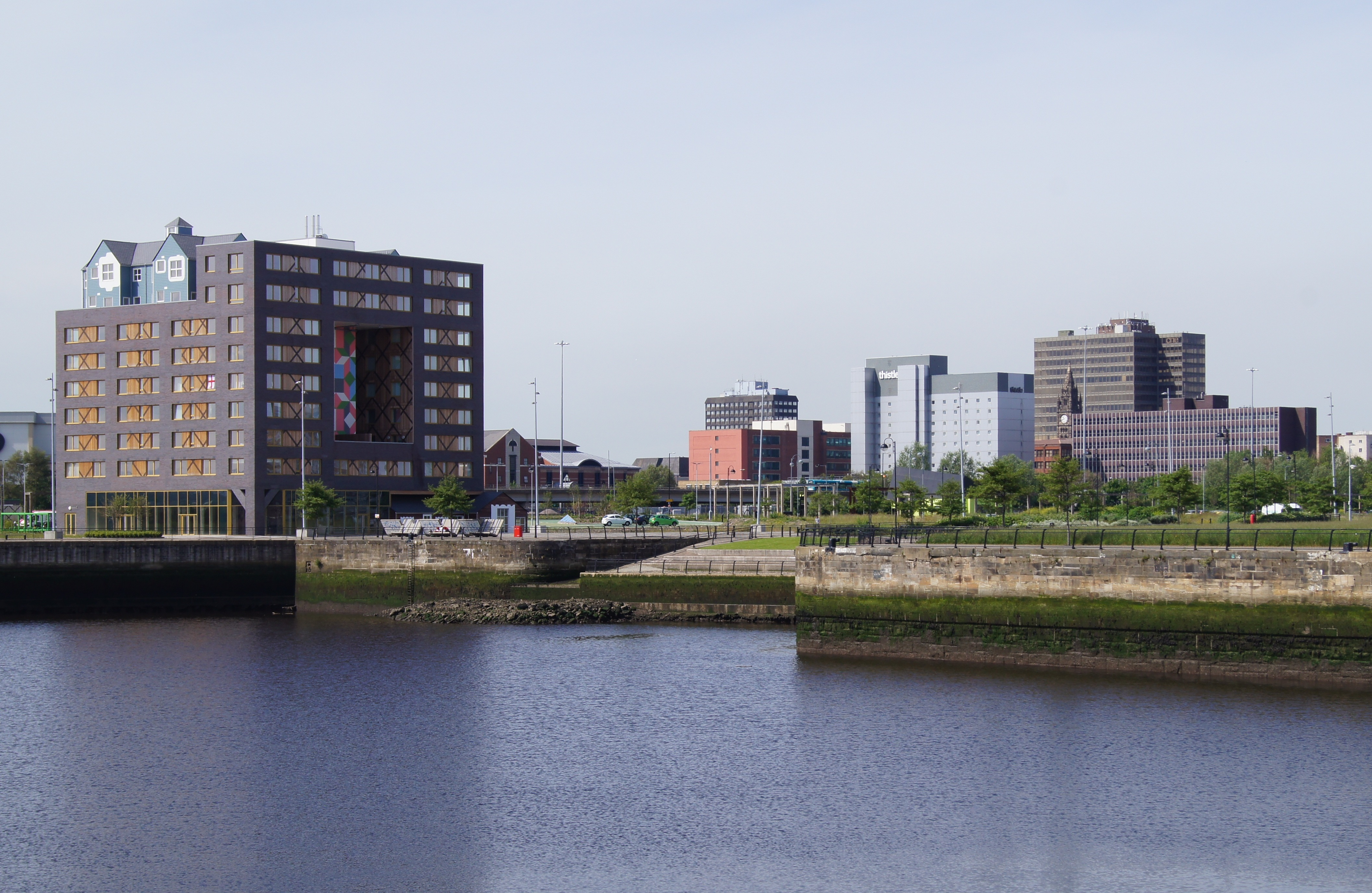
Community in a Cube apartment building on the left and the docks in the foreground

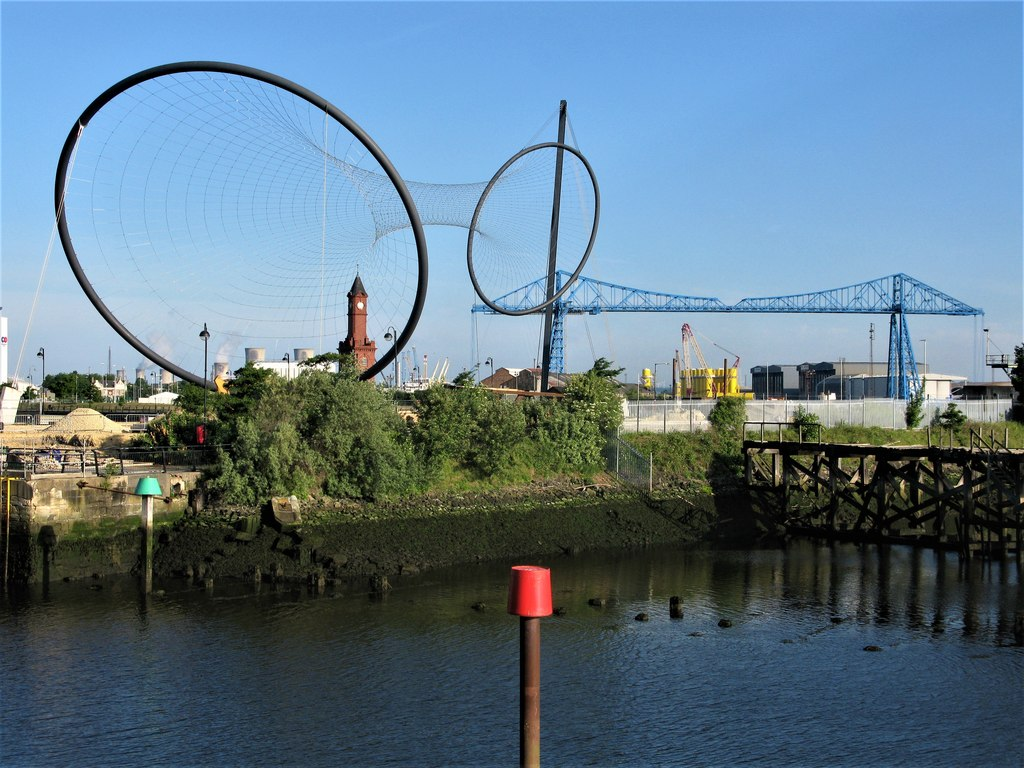
Temenos Sculpture, dock clock tower and Middlesbrough Transporter Bridge

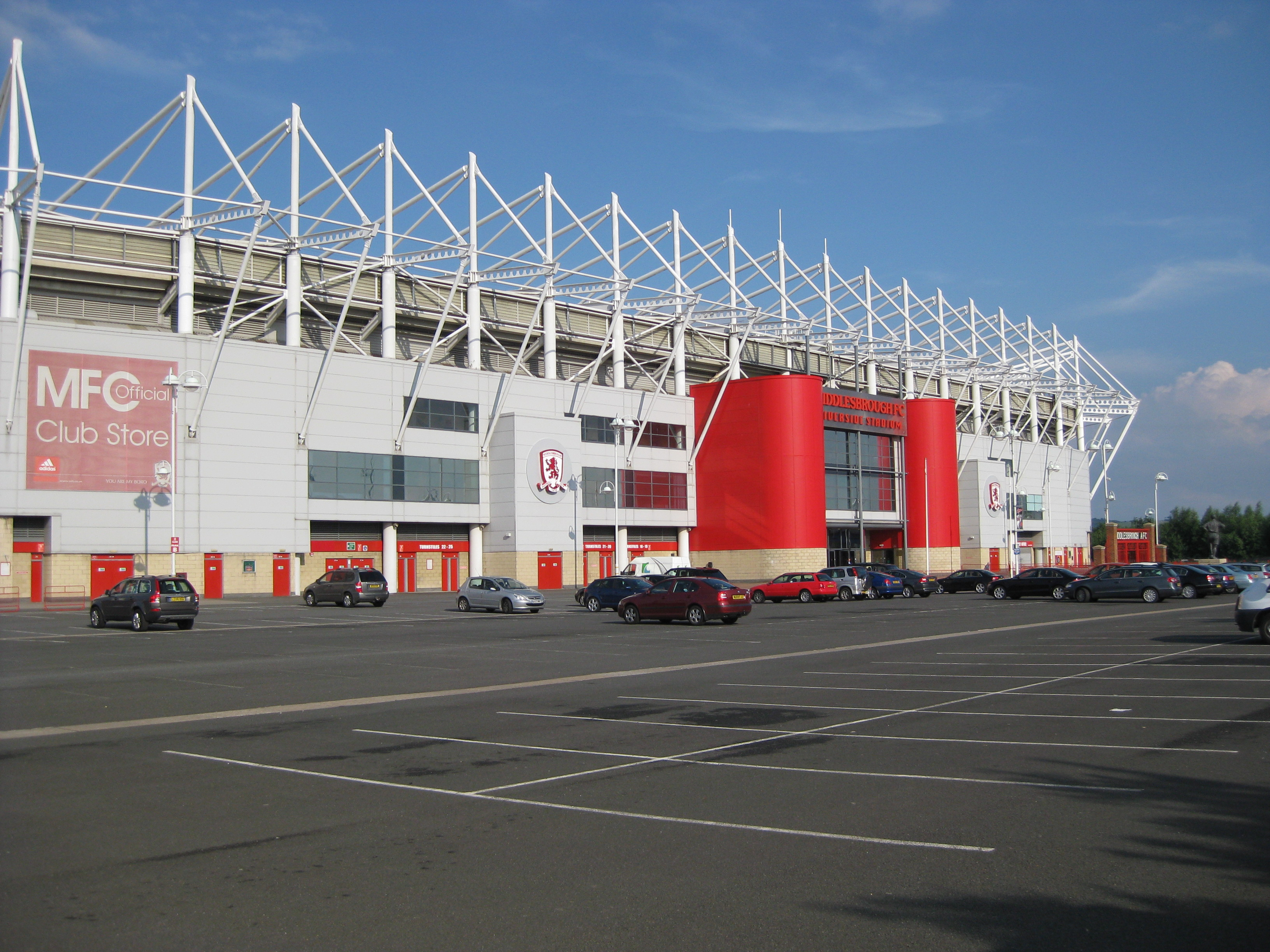
Riverside Stadium, home of Middlesbrough FC

== See also ==
- Boho, County Fermanagh
- Bolckow, Vaughan
- Middlesbrough Priory
- Sheffield Old Town Hall
