= Penry Williams (politician) =

British politician

Penry Williams

Penry Williams (5 September 1866 – 26 June 1945) was a Liberal Party politician in England, born in Middlesbrough, a son of Edward Williams, a Cleveland ironmaster, and brother of Member of Parliament (MP) Aneurin Williams.

Williams was elected at the January 1910 general election as MP for the usually Liberal Middlesbrough constituency in the North Riding of Yorkshire. When the constituency was divided at the 1918 general election, he was elected for the new Middlesbrough East constituency, but was defeated at the 1922 general election by the Conservative Party candidate John Wesley Brown.

With rifts in the Liberal Party healed, the party's fortunes recovered at the 1923 general election, and Williams regained his seat. His return was short-lived, because at the 1924 general election he was unseated in a close three-way contest by the Labour Party candidate Ellen Wilkinson. At the 1929 general election, he stood as the Liberal Party candidate for Berwick-on-Tweed where he came close to gaining the seat from the Conservatives.

== Family tree ==
Iolo Morganwg (Edward Williams); 1747–1826
Taliesin ab Iolo (Taliesin Williams); 1787–1847
Edward Williams; 1826–1886
Aneurin Williams; 1859–1924 | Penry Williams; 1866–1945
Iolo Aneurin Williams; 1890–1962
Edward Williams; 1921–2013

Parliament of the United Kingdom
| Preceded by Joseph Havelock Wilson | Member of Parliament for Middlesbrough; January 1910 – 1918 | Constituency abolished |
| New constituency | Member of Parliament for Middlesbrough East; 1918 – 1922 | Succeeded by John Wesley Brown |
| Preceded by John Wesley Brown | Member of Parliament for Middlesbrough East; 1923 – 1924 | Succeeded by Ellen Wilkinson |
