= Aneurin Owen =

Aneurin Owen may refer to:

- Aneurin Owen (antiquarian)
- Aneurin Owen (rugby union)
