= Aneurin Richards =

Welsh footballer

Aneurin Glyndŵr Richards
Personal information
- Date of birth: 24 August 1902
- Place of birth: Mardy, Rhondda, Wales
- Date of death: 4 January 1976
- Place of death: Barnsley, England
- Height: 5 ft 8 in (1.73 m)
- Position: Defender

Senior career*
Years	Team	Apps	(Gls)
1927-1934	Barnsley	122	
1935	Southport	1	

International career
1931	Wales	1	(0)
- * Club domestic league appearances and goals

Aneurin Richards (24 August 1902 – ) was a Welsh international footballer. He was part of the Wales national football team, playing 1 match on 31 October 1931 against Scotland.

== See also ==
- List of Wales international footballers (alphabetical)
