= Middlesbrough Priory =

Priory in Middlesbrough, North Yorkshire, England

Coordinates: 54°34′55.9″N 1°13′56.7″W

Middlesbrough Priory was a priory in Middlesbrough, North Yorkshire, England. It was founded in 1119 by Robert de Brus as a Benedictine house.

On 1 January 1539, the priory was leased free-of-charge to four men. It has been suggested that this was to shield it from confiscation during the Dissolution of the Monasteries.

No trace remains of the priory.
