= Old Town Hall, Middlesbrough =

Building in Middlesbrough, England

Old Town Hall
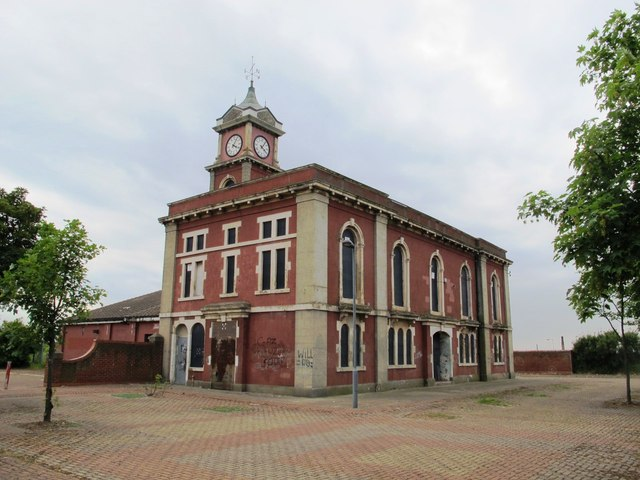
- Old Town Hall

- Shown in North Yorkshire
- 54.5824°N 1.2349°W
- Location: East Street, Middlesbrough

History
- Built: 1846

Site notes
- Architect: William Lambie Moffatt
- Architectural style: Italianate style

Listed Building – Grade II
- Official name: Old Town Hall, Market Place
- Designated: 28 July 1988
- Reference no.: 1139853

Listed Building – Grade II
- Official name: Clock Tower c. 5 metres south-west of Old Town Hall, Market Place
- Designated: 28 July 1988
- Reference no.: 1312502

The Old Town Hall is a municipal building in the Middlehaven area of Middlesbrough, North Yorkshire, England. The building is on East Street and has been vacant since 1996. It is a Grade II listed building with the adjacent clock tower also separately Grade II listed.

== History ==
Following significant population growth, largely associated with the iron-smelting industry, civic leaders decided to commission a town hall. The site chosen was a prominent area in the newly-established market place in what was at that time the centre of the town. The new building, together with an attached market hall, was designed by William Lambie Moffatt in the Italianate style; built in red brick with stone dressings, it was completed in 1846.

The design involved a symmetrical main frontage with five bays on the north side, facing towards the River Tees. The central bay featured a doorway with a segmental surround and an entablature on the ground floor, and a round headed window with an architrave and a keystone on the first floor. The outer bays were fenestrated by mullioned windows on the ground floor and by round headed windows with architraves and keystones on the first floor. The end bays, which were slightly projected forward, were flanked by pilasters supporting a cornice and a parapet. Internally the principal room was the council chamber on the first floor (accessed by way of its own entrance on the east side of the building); it had a public gallery at the east end, and a venetian window at the opposite end. There were shops and offices on the ground floor.

The north entrance gave access through the main building to an attached market hall at the rear, with separate spaces for a fish market and a meat market. The market hall was a single-storey structure, with pedimented entrances on the south, west and east sides (in addition to the main entrance to the north). In 1858 a four-stage clock tower was built within the walls of the already-existing market hall. It featured blind round headed windows in the second and third stages and clock faces in the fourth stage with a trumpet-shaped roof above. The tower contained a bell 'cast from the same model as the bell in the clock tower of her Majesty’s castle of Balmoral'.

Middlesbrough went on to become a municipal borough with the town hall as its headquarters in 1853. However, in the early 1880s, civic leaders decided to procure a more substantial town hall on open land in a developing area to the south of the Middlesbrough branch of the Stockton and Darlington Railway.

In the 1930s the market hall was rebuilt in a more modern style and with up-to-date facilities; at the same time, however, the surrounding area was falling into decline. The housing that had grown up around the market place in the 19th century was demolished in the slum clearances of the 1950s and a large suburban housing estate known as St Hilda's was established there in the 1970s. In 1954 the old town hall was made into a public library, while the ground floor became a police station. The market hall was demolished in the early 1960s (apart from the clock tower) and in the early 1970s a health clinic was built on the site.

The old town hall continued to be used as a public library and as a community events venue for the St Hilda's estate until it was closed by Middlesbrough Council in 1996. Despite a local campaign to retain the estate, most of the 1970s housing was demolished as part of a regeneration project in the early years of the 21st century leaving the town hall derelict and isolated. After works began on the development of a new local digital media, digital technologies, and creative quarter in 2008, local councillors indicated their intention to secure the survival of the old town hall as part of the development of the zone.

In 2025 Middlesbrough Council was awarded £4.5 million from the National Lottery Heritage Fund, enabling it to restore and rebuild the old town hall to serve as 'office space for businesses in the digital sector'. Restoration work began in February 2026 and was scheduled to be completed by 2028. Soon after work began, a time capsule was discovered, encased within the foundation stone of the clock tower (which had been laid by the Mayor, Henry Thompson, in 1858).
