= Aneurin Williams =

British politician

Aneurin Williams

Aneurin Williams (11 October 1859 – 20 January 1924) was a British Liberal Party politician.

== Background ==
He was born in Dowlais, Glamorganshire, the second son of Edward Williams, CE, JP, ironmaster, of Cleveland Lodge, Middlesbrough. He was the great-grandson of Iolo Morganwg, founder of the Gorsedd. He was educated privately before attending St John's College, Cambridge where he received a Bachelor of Arts in Classical Tripos in 1880 and a Master of Arts in 1883. He married, in 1888, Helen Elizabeth Pattinson, of Shipcote House, Gateshead. They had one son Iolo Aneurin Williams and one daughter, Helen Ursula Williams. His wife Helen died in 1922.

== Professional career ==
He was Called to Bar, Inner Temple in 1884. He was one of the acting partners at Linthorpe Ironworks, in Middlesbrough from 1886 to 1890.

== Political career ==
He joined the Liberal Party. He was firstly the unsuccessful Liberal candidate for the safe Conservative Medway Division of Kent at the 1906 General Election. He was one of the successful Liberal candidates for the dual member Plymouth Division of Devon at the January 1910 General Election. He was defeated at the Plymouth in the December 1910 General Election. He was the successful Liberal candidate for the North West Durham Division at the 1914 North West Durham by-election.

Williams victory as portrayed in the local press

1914 North West Durham by-election Electorate 20,233
| Party | Candidate | Votes | % | ±% |
|---|---|---|---|---|
| Liberal | Aneurin Williams | 7,241 | 40.6 | −24.5 |
| Unionist | James Ogden Hardicker | 5,564 | 31.2 | −3.7 |
| Labour | G. H. Stuart-Bunning | 5,026 | 28.2 | +28.2 |
| Majority | | 1,677 | 9.4 | −20.8 |
| Turnout | | | 88.1 | +12.8 |
| Liberal hold | | Swing | -10.4 | |

In September 1915, Williams, along with Lord Bryce, attempted to publicize the Armenian genocide. In a public letter published in The New York Times, Bryce wrote that he agreed with Williams that "the civilized world ... ought to know" about the Ottoman Turks' "plan of extirpating Christianity by killing off the Christians of the Armenian race". This letter estimated that 250,000 Armenians had escaped from the Ottoman Empire, while "perhaps 500,000 have been slaughtered or deported". A series of speeches in Parliament by Williams, Lord Robert Cecil, and T. P. O'Connor about the Armenian genocide were later published as a pamphlet entitled The Armenian Question.

He served as a Justice of the peace in Surrey. He was Director of the First Garden City Ltd. He was Chairman of the executive committee of the Land Nationalisation Society. He was Chairman of the Executive of the International Co-operative Alliance. He was a Director of the Welsh National House Trust Ltd.

He was the successful Liberal candidate for the Consett Division of Durham at the 1918 General Election.

General election 1918: Consett Electorate 34,393
| Party | Candidate | Votes | % | ±% |
|---|---|---|---|---|
| Liberal | Aneurin Williams | 7,576 | 34.3 | n/a |
| National Democratic | Robert Gee | 7,283 | 32.9 | n/a |
| Labour | G. H. Stuart-Bunning | 7,268 | 32.8 | n/a |
| Majority | | 293 | 1.4 | n/a |
| Turnout | | | 64.3 | n/a |
| Liberal win | | | | |

- denotes candidate who was endorsed by the Coalition Government.

He was Joint Honorary Secretary of the Labour Co-partnership Association. He was Chairman of the British Armenia Committee. He was Treasurer of the Proportional Representation Society. He was Chairman of the House of Commons Committee on Public Accounts, from 1921 to 1922. He was a Member of the Executive of the League of Nations Union. At the next General Election he was finally defeated;

General election 1922: Consett Electorate 37,886
| Party | Candidate | Votes | % | ±% |
|---|---|---|---|---|
| Labour | Herbert Dunnico | 14,469 | 46.5 | +13.7 |
| Liberal | Aneurin Williams | 9,870 | 31.8 | |
| Unionist | Sydney Wilson | 6,745 | 21.7 | |
| Majority | | 4,599 | 14.7 | |
| Turnout | | | 82.0 | +17.7 |
| Labour gain from Liberal | | Swing | | |

Both his children also stood as Liberal Party candidates. His son Iolo contested Chelsea in 1924 and 1929. His daughter Ursula came close to re-gaining her father's seat of Consett at the 1923 General Election.

== Publications ==
- Twenty-eight Years of Co-partnership at Guise (1908) Labour Co-Partnership Association
- Co-partnership and Profit-sharing (1927) Williams and Norgate
- article on Co-operative Societies in the Encyclopædia Britannica

== Family tree ==
Iolo Morganwg (Edward Williams); 1747–1826
Taliesin ab Iolo (Taliesin Williams); 1787–1847
Edward Williams; 1826–1886
Aneurin Williams; 1859–1924 | Penry Williams; 1866–1945
Iolo Aneurin Williams; 1890–1962
Edward Williams; 1921–2013

Parliament of the United Kingdom
| Preceded by Thomas Dobson and Charles Mallet | Member of Parliament for Plymouth; Jan. 1910–Dec. 1910; With: Charles Mallet | Succeeded by Waldorf Astor and Arthur Benn |
| Preceded by Llewellyn Atherley-Jones | Member of Parliament for North West Durham; 1914–1918 | Constituency abolished |
| New constituency | Member of Parliament for Consett; 1918–1922 | Succeeded by Herbert Dunnico |
