= Welsh dance =

Traditional dance in Wales

Welsh dance Dawns Gymreig
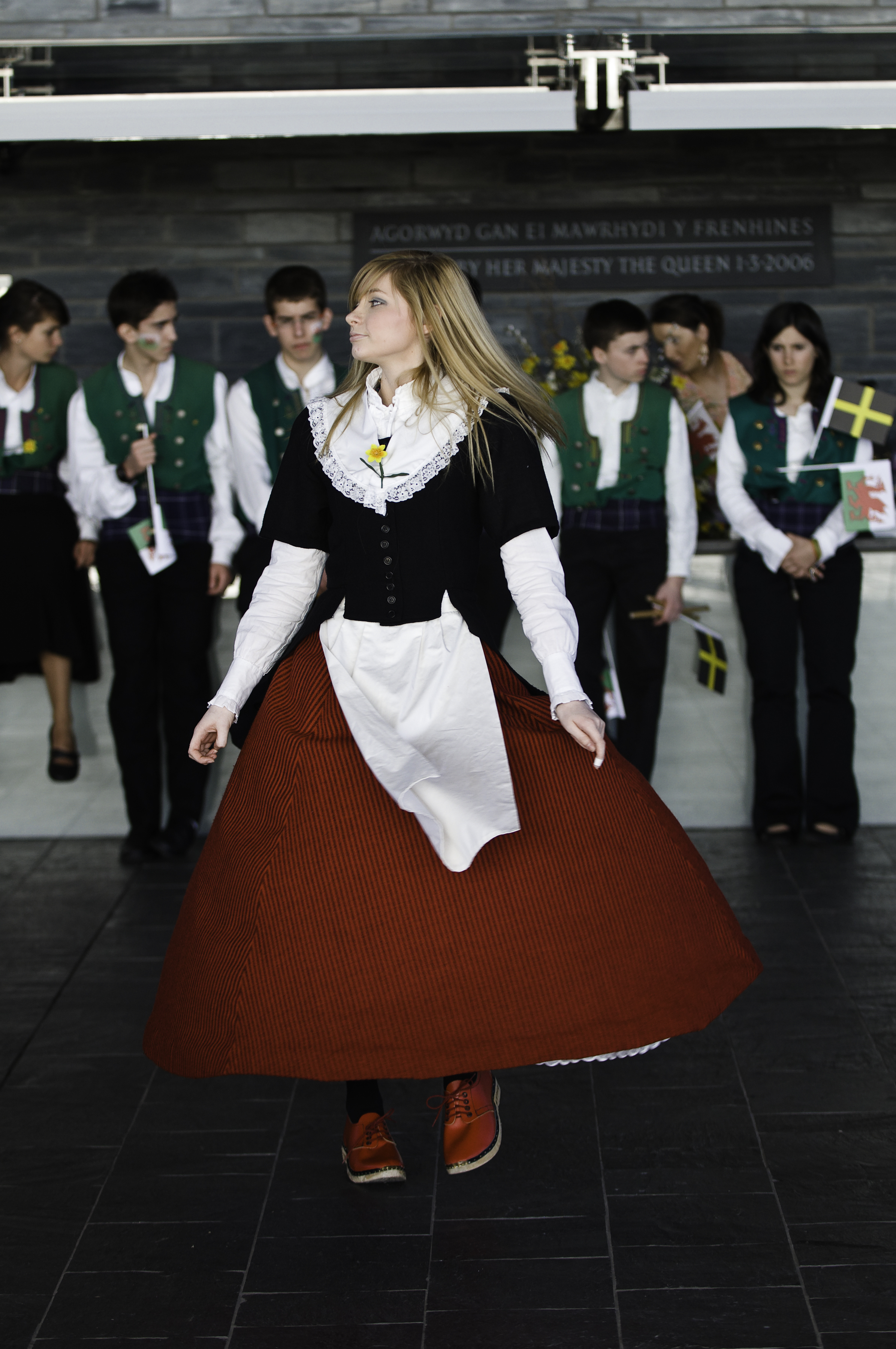
- Medium: Dance
- Originating culture: Welsh
- Originating era: Before the 17th century

Welsh dance (Welsh: Dawns Gymreig), also known as Welsh folk dancing (Welsh: Dawnsio gwerin), is the collection of traditional dances originating in Wales. While Welsh dance shares similarities to traditional Cornish, English and Irish dances, Welsh dance has a reputation as more difficult and more athletic than its counterparts.

Often performed in traditional Welsh costume to Welsh folk music, Welsh dancing traditions were almost entirely lost in the nineteenth century as religious fervour took over the nation and such activities came to be viewed as immoral. However, traditions such as the Llangadfan Dances, the Llanover Dances and the Nantgarw Dances were recorded and revived by a small group of academics and enthusiasts. As such, Welsh dance once again regained its position as an integral part of Welsh cultural life in the twentieth century.

== History ==
There is a lack of written records of Welsh dance before the eighteenth century with Gerald of Wales's description of a Welsh dance near Brecon on St. Almedah’s day, 1188 being a rare exception.

This lack of early documentation could exemplify how integral dance was to everyday life in Wales, while the lack of written sources can be viewed as a feature of the cultural changes enforced by the Penal laws against the Welsh and Laws in Wales Acts 1535 and 1542. These acts saw certain aspects of Welsh culture legally prohibited, as the Kingdom of England forbid any public assembly by Welsh people, banned them from holding property in English boroughs and prohibited Welsh men (and English men who married Welsh women) from holding public office. The affect of these changes was to replace Welsh culture within the affluent class with an anglicised gentry, who used the English language and English customs almost exclusively.

=== 17th and 18th centuries ===
These prohibitions on Welsh culture had diminished by the seventeenth century, although the early century is notable for traditional Welsh dances being included as part of solely English collections under English translations of original Welsh names (Hoffedd ap Hywel becoming the English country dance Powell's Fancy). The English composer John Playford began collecting and publishing Welsh dances in the mid-17th century, including Lord of Caernarfon's Jig and Abergenny. In the early 18th century John Walsh also published a number of Welsh dances in English collections, such as Evan's Delight (1718) and Meillionen (1726).

Written evidence of the popularity of Welsh dance is also more readily found by this time. The discoveries of William Robert’s poem Taplas Gwainfo (The Taplas of Wenvoe) and William Thomas’ diaries, provided historians with the earliest proof of the popularity of social dancing at outdoor festivals in Glamorganshire.

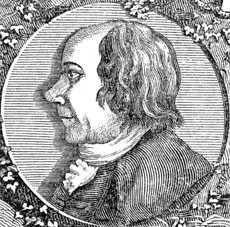
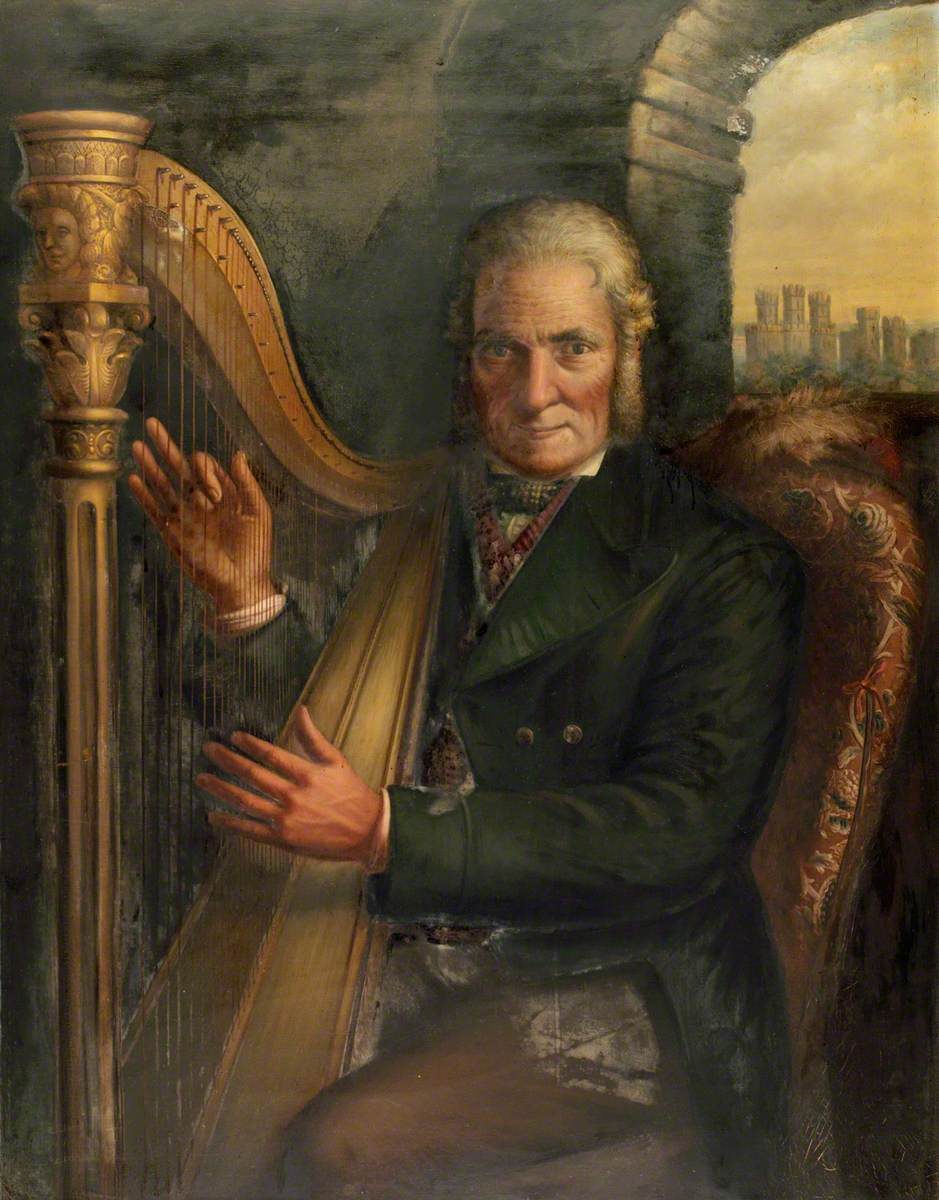
William Jones and Edward Jones were critical figures in recording and reviving traditional Welsh dance in the 18th century.

The later eighteenth century saw a revival of interest in Welsh culture, with William Jones playing an active role in arresting the loss of Welsh dances and music. Wishing to revive the dance and music traditions from his own area, Jones interviewed the elderly members of his community and worked closely with his own father, William Sion Dafydd to revive the dances he had learned in his youth in the late seventeenth century. Through his work, Jones rediscovered numerous dances together with the ancient airs, melodies and stanzas that accompanied them. The corpus of work is today known as the Llangadfan Dances.

In the course of this work, Williams Jones became a notable authority on manuscripts and printed collections. Jones actively corresponded with the London-based Gwyneddigion Society and other contemporary men of letters such as Edward Jones (Bardd y Brenin), bard to King George IV, which in turn provided Edward Jones with material for his own printed volumes, and the earliest work on Welsh dances: Musical and Poetical Relicks of the Welsh Bards in 1784.

=== 19th century decline ===
As early as 1703 Ellis Wynne was attacking "the evils of dance" and warning about what effects the closeness of the sexes may have on the population. The extrovert and carefree nature of the Welsh psyche was becoming one of zealous piety, with all forms of dance being viewed as enjoyment and closeness with the opposite sex were deemed as sinful by many. Another victim of these religious hostilities was the fiddle music which accompanied many dances. While the Welsh Harp was viewed with poious respectability and became a symbol of Wales, the tradition of itinerant fiddle players would never be seen as acceptabile and saw a gradual decline in Welsh dance culture throughout the century. In 1802 Edward Jones lamented what he saw as a decline in Welsh culture and those who had inhibited the music and dancing of the common folk:

"The sudden decline of the national Minstrelsy, and Customs of Wales, is in a great degree to be attributed to the fanatick imposters, or illiterate plebeian preachers, who have too often been suffered to over-run the country, misleading the greater part of the common people from their lawful Church; and dissuading them from their innocent amusements, such as Singing, Dancing, and other rural Sports, and Games, which heretofore they had been accustomed to delight in, from the earliest time."

— Edward Jones, The Bardic Museum 1802

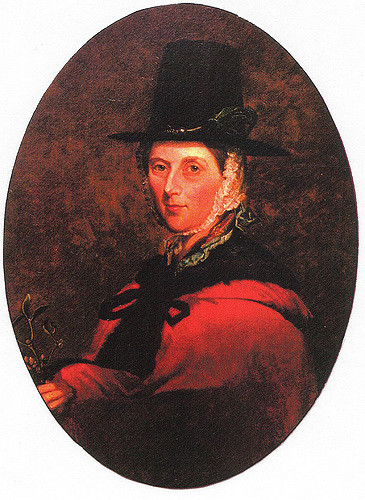
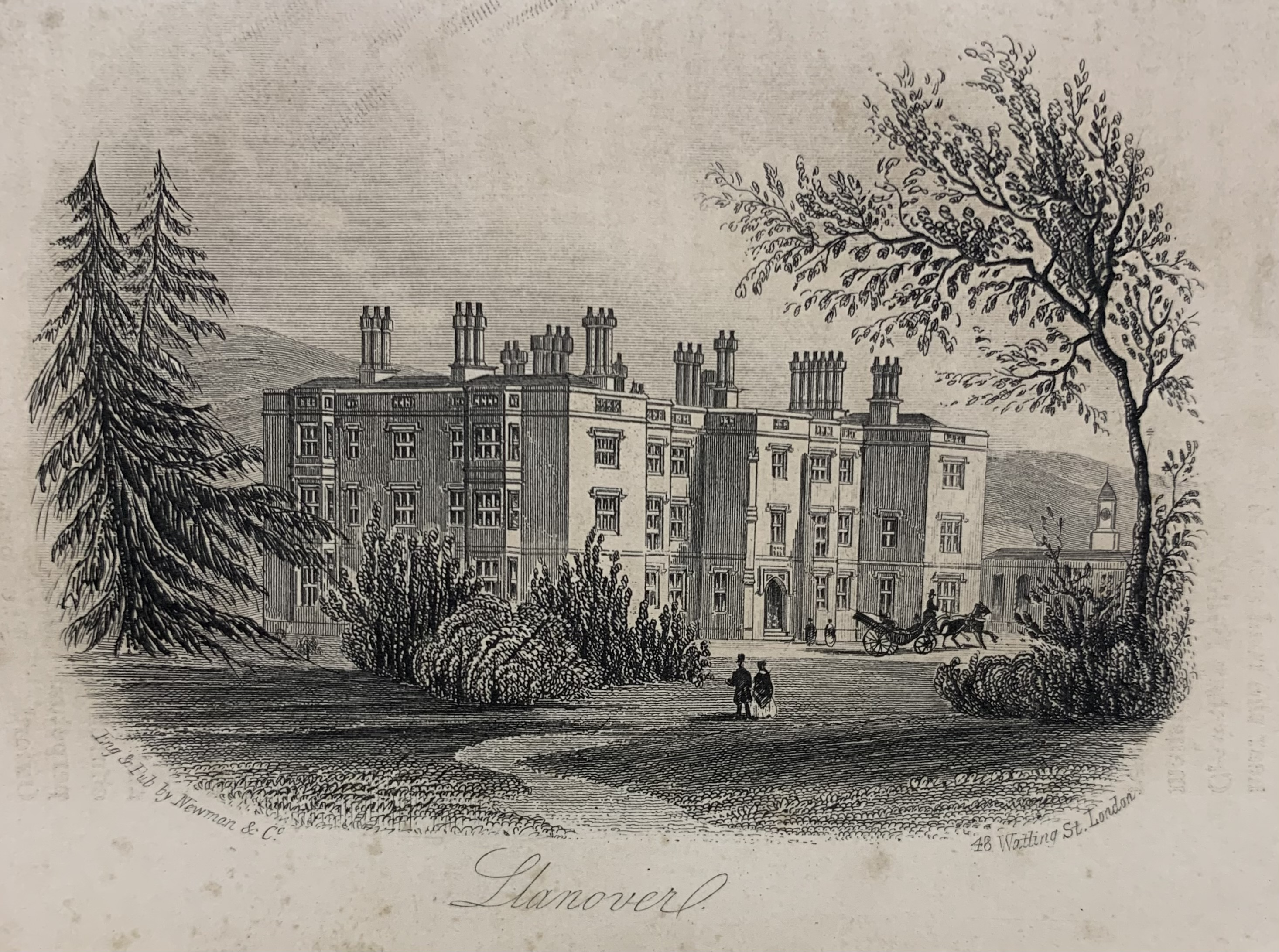
Lady Llanover (left) was responsible for cultural revival at Llanover House (right). These events became the basis for what is today known as the Llanover Dances

While the national, social and moral consciousness of Welsh people would be forever changed by the religious movements of the eighteenth century. The nineteenth century saw a new renaissance of Welsh cultural institutions, which attempted to record and revive Welsh traditions that were being lost to these rapid social changes. One important revival become a feature of events at Llanover House in the first half of the nineteenth century, with dances held there by Lady Llanover to entertain distinguished guests and became a centre for harpists, bards and Plygain. The position of Court Harpist was given to John Wood Jones before his student, Thomas Gruffydd of Llangynidr took the position until his death in 1887. Gruffydd was a sixth generation harpist and his daighter, Susannah Berrington Gruffydd Richards would become the third and final Court Harpist at Llanover. In her later life, Gruffydd Richards would continue to teach the dances through her work with villagers and local schools, becoming the central figure in continuing the living tradition of the Llanover Dances, as well as becoming the principal source for academics and revivalists.

Despite this, Welsh dance continued to decline as national pastime throughout the century. If the dominance of Nonconformity in Wales did not wholly eradicate traditional Welsh music and dance, it was dealt a debilitating blow. Societal changes such as the decelining popularity of fairs and festivals, rapid urbanisation and the advent of the railways also exacerbated the decline of Welsh traditions. By the end of the century the total demise of Welsh folk dancing seemed inevitable, with only clog dancing and some morris dances surviving in their entirety.

Catherine Margretta Thomas was born in 1880 in the village of Nantgarw. Her parents were Daniel and Hannah Davies. As a child she enjoyed watching the local dances as they were performed in an open space below Twyn Chapel in Caerphilly and at Nantgarw and Y Groes Wen. Due to the hostility of the local churches to folk dancing, Catherine Margretta Thomas' own mother was not keen on her daughter going to see these dances, but Catherine was able to convince her father to take her along to witness the displays. However, by the time Catherine Margretta Thomas was in her teens folk dancing had practically been eradicated in Nantgarw.

=== 20th century revival ===
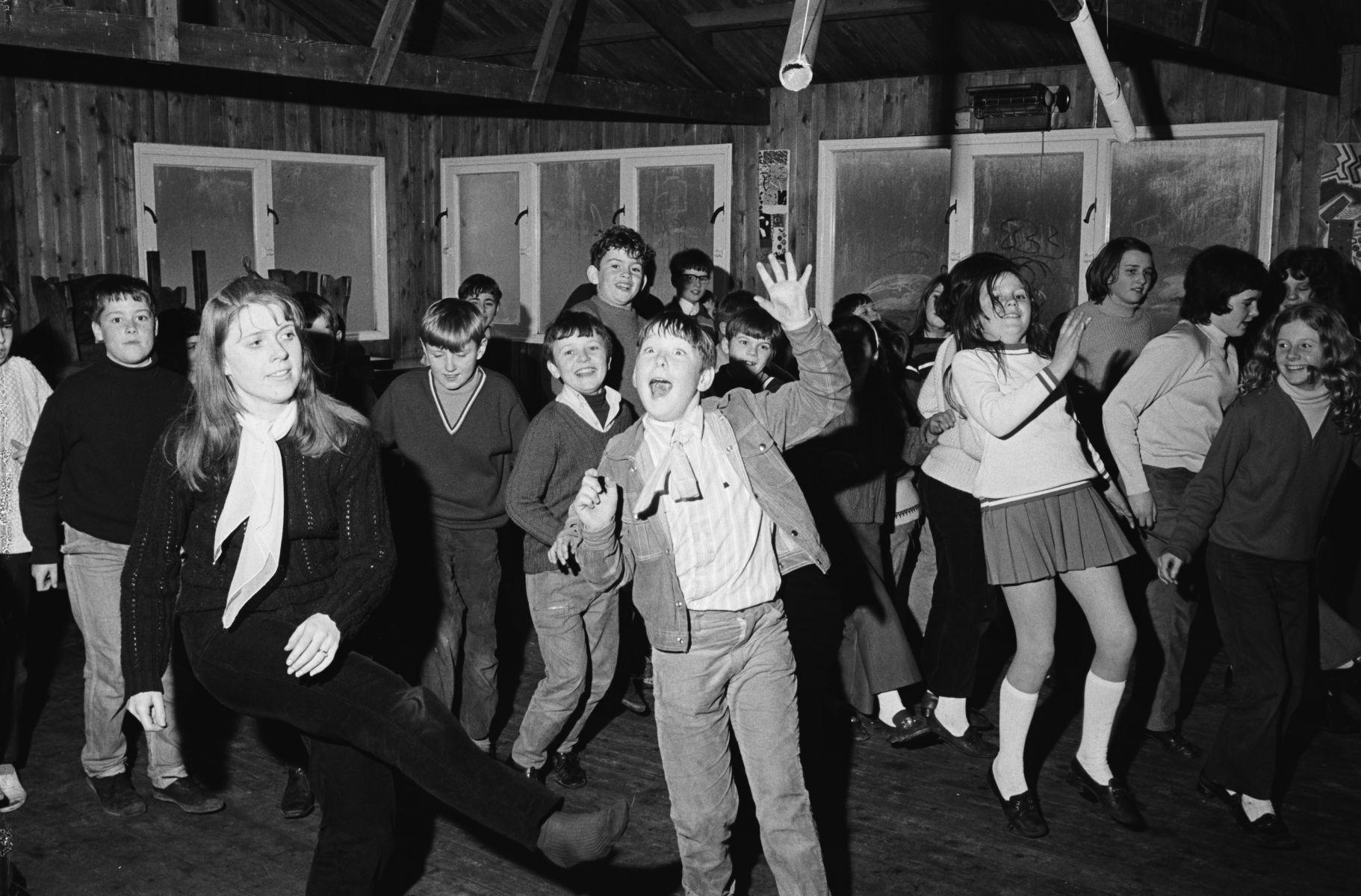
One of the Welsh Folk Dance Society's annual courses teaching the newly revived Welsh traditions in Bangor, 1966 (left). Children learning Welsh dance at an Urdd Gobaith Cymru camp in 1971. Organisations such as these helped revive Welsh dance throughout the 20th century (right).

According to Ceinwen Thomas, Welsh Dance had "died hard" by 1911 when she was born in Nantgarw to Catherine Margretta Thomas. With other twentieth century writers stating that "The fervent zeal of the religious revival of the latter part of the last century and the early years of the present century, persecuted and exiled old traditionally Welsh dances."

However, as the influence of Nonconformism waned and by the time Ceinwen Thomas was attending school she was discussing the tradition of dancing in Nantgarw with her mother. After Ceinwen Thomas had left college she met Walter Dowding of the Welsh National Folk Dance Society. She told him about her mother's recollections of folk dancing in Nantgarw. He put her in touch with Doris Freeman. Together Catherine Margretta Thomas, Ceinwen Thomas and Doris Freeman worked to notate the dance steps from the traditional dances that Catherine Margretta Thomas could remember. These notes were then passed on to the Welsh National Folk Dance Society by Ceinwen Thomas.

It was amongst this revival that the first modern work on Welsh dance was published. Welsh National Music and Dance by W.S. Gwynn Williams in 1932, and was soon followed by Hugh Mellor's Welsh Folk Dances: An Inquiry three years later. Mellor's work was primarily based on information he had obtained from Susannah Berrington Gruffydd Richards. Gruffydd Richards would prove to be invaluable to the renaissance of Welsh dance and Welsh culture, becoming recognised as the "chief harpist of Gwent". Through her work teaching the Llanover dances that her father had composed for the revival at Llanover House, Gruffydd Richards was largely responsible for their continuation as a living tradition into the twentieth century.

Another important woman in the revival movement was Lois Blake. Blake to moved to Llangwm, Denbighshire in 1930 and having worked in the English Folk Dance and Song Society was astonished at the relatively small number of dances performed. Blake collaborated with W.S. Gwynn Williams to publish a series of dance manuals she had collected of the Welsh tradition. Blake published Welsh Folk Dance in 1948, before becoming a founding member and first president of the Welsh Folk Dance Society the following year.

==== Nantgarw dance tradition ====
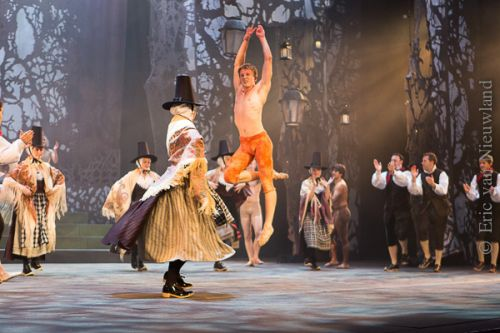
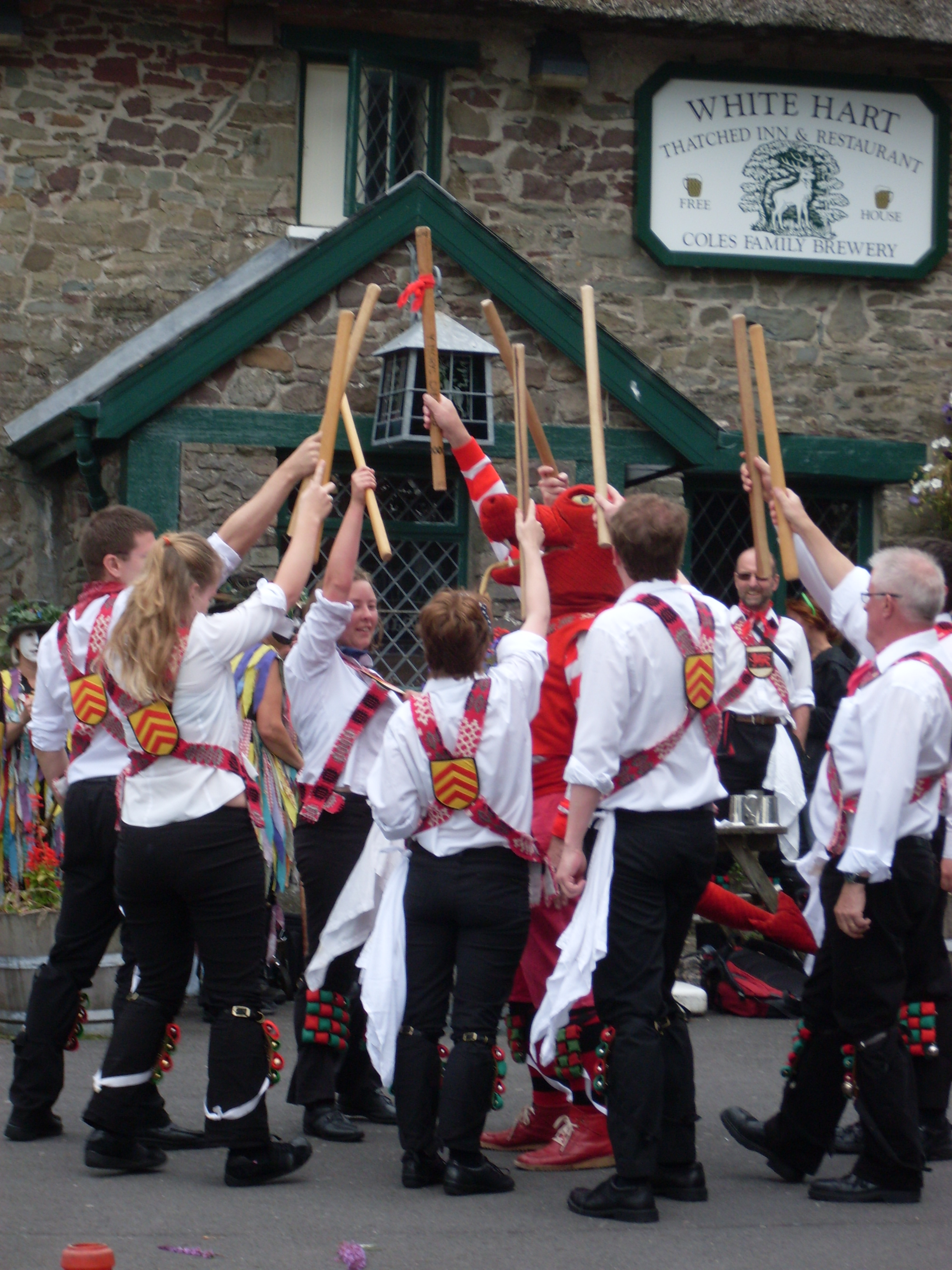
Ballet Cymru performing with Dawnswyr Nantgarw (Nantgarw Dancers) at the Wales Millennium Centre (left) and Morris Dancers performing a Nantgarw Morris (right).

The Nantgarw dance tradition is a style of Welsh folk dancing from the South and Valleys regions of Wales, specifically associated with the small village of Nantgarw. The style encompasses both handkerchief and stick dances. The dances call for eight dancers in four pairs. The style was first put into dance notation by Dr. Ceinwen Thomas (1911-2008) who wrote down what her mother, Catherine Margretta Thomas, could remember of the dances that had been danced locally when she was young. The Nantgarw dances take their name from the village of Nantgarw in the county borough of Rhondda Cynon Taf where they are said to have first been performed.

=== 21st century ===
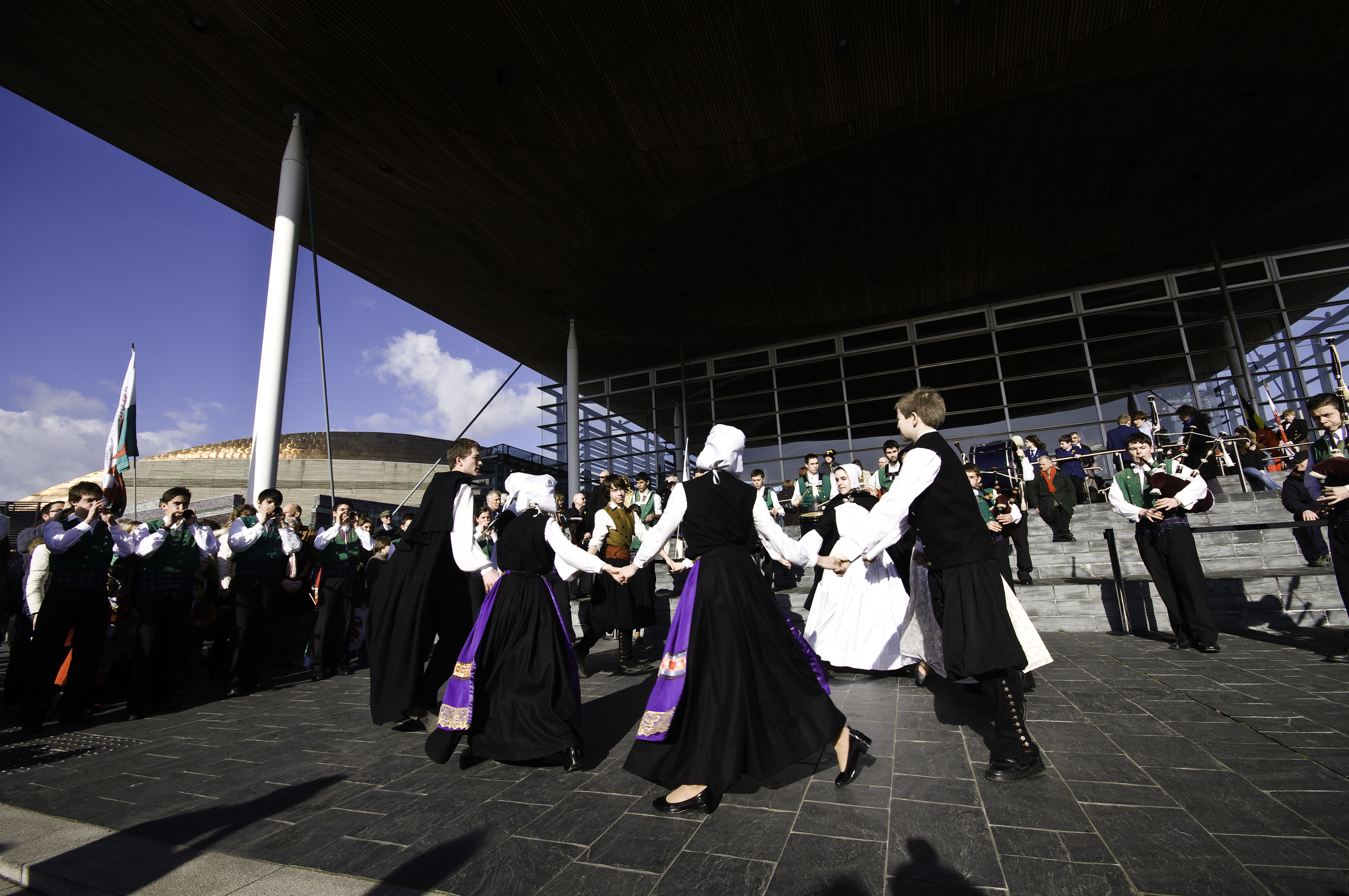
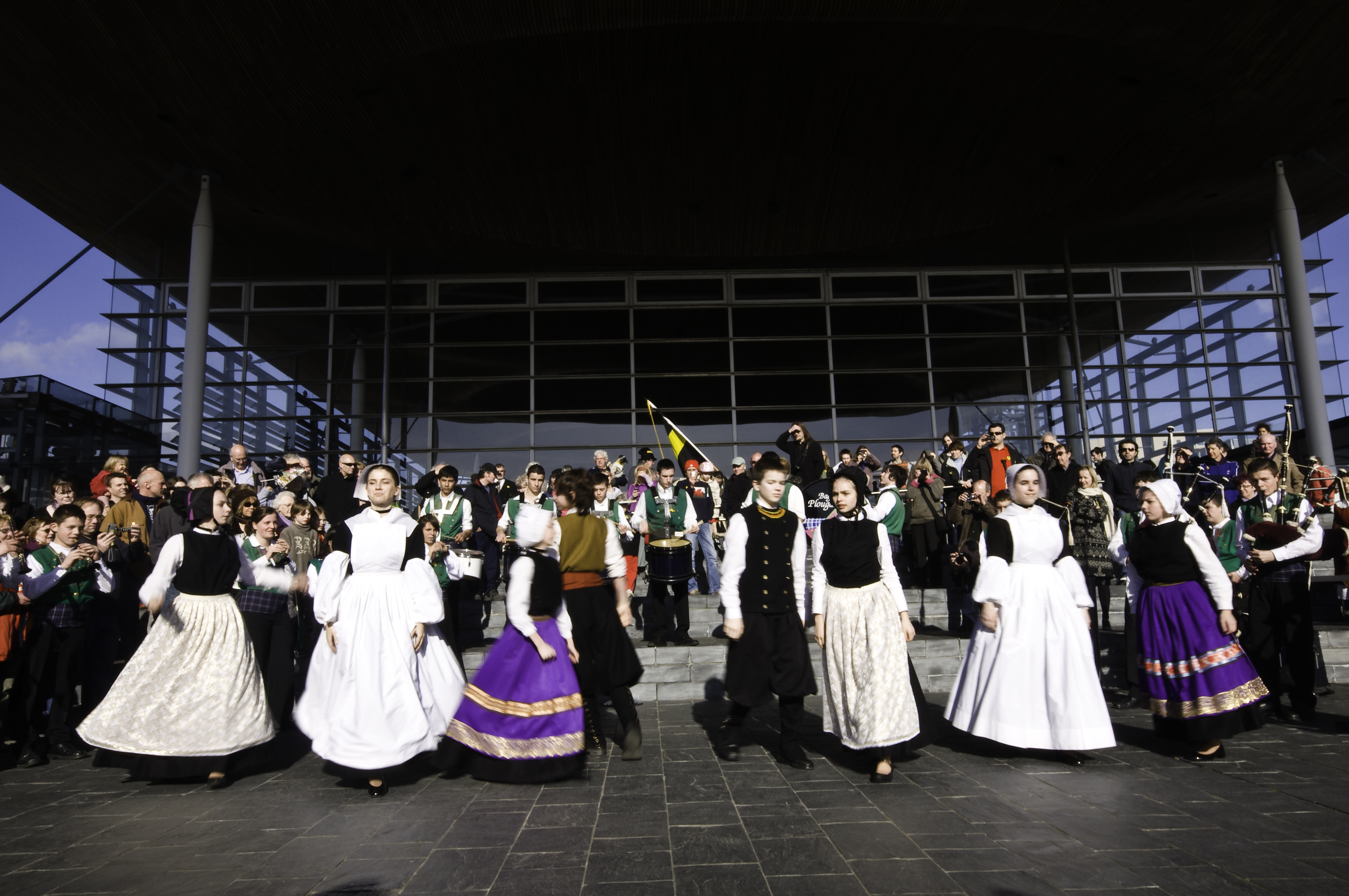
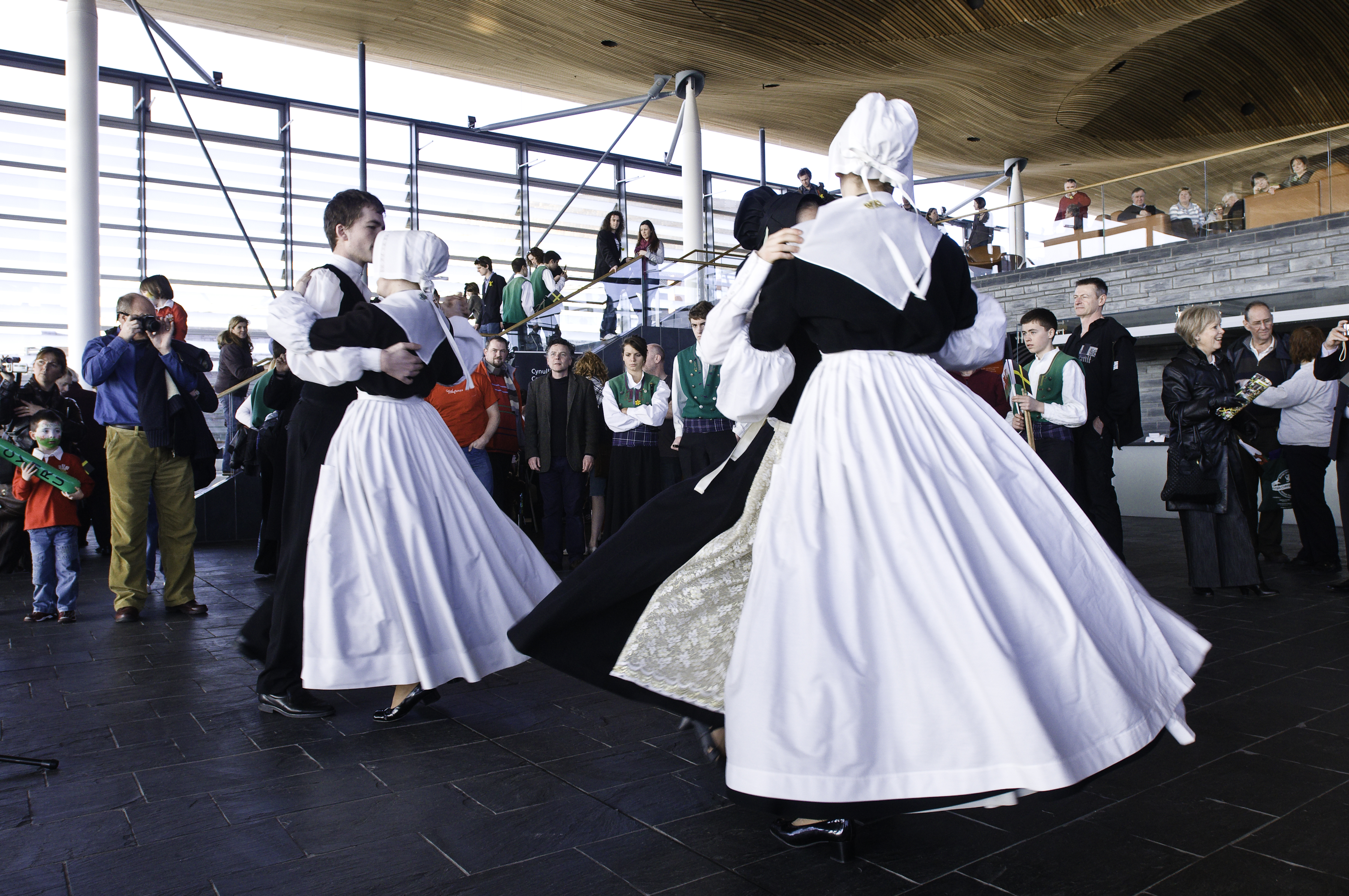
Welsh dance is seen as an integral part of Welsh cultural events, such as the St David's Day celebrations at the Senedd building

Today, Welsh dance is seen as an essential expression of the culture of Wales with the Arts Council of Wales and the Senedd government funding and promoting dance programmes and competitions. For much of the early century the community dance sector was seen as strong, with Community Dance Wales developing "world-leading activities" (including disability initiatives), courses in higher and further education and new venues such as the Wales Millennium Centre. However structural and economic issues has seen support for Welsh dance decline sharply in recent years, with the Arts Council experiencing a 40% budget cut in real terms Since 2010.

== Competitions ==
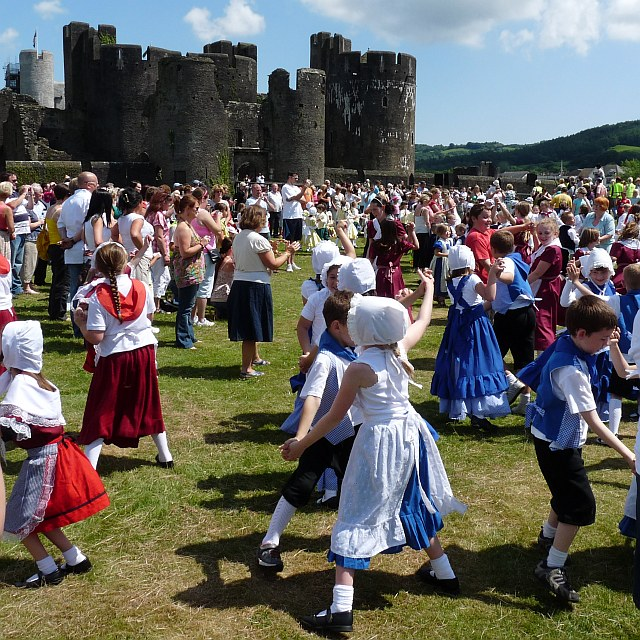
Day of dance, Caerphilly Castle.

Some of the most integral competitions in Welsh dance are those of the local, Urdd (youth) and National eisteddfodau, and Welsh dance competitions is an intrinsic part of any eisteddfod. Notable dancing groups include Nantgarw Dancers hailing from the Pontypridd area and Talog dancers from Carmarthen. Both groups have enjoyed significant success in National Eisteddfod competitions. Nantgarw dancers have also had significant success in international competitions such as the Llangollen International Eisteddfod in Wales, Lorient Folk Festival in France and Mallorca World Folk Festival in Spain.

== Reputation for difficulty ==
"Men and women individually selected us to dance. As the females were very handsome, it is most probable we would have accepted their offers, had there not been a powerful reason to prevent us - our complete inability to unravel the mazes of a Welsh dance."

— A Walk through Wales - Richard Warner, 1799

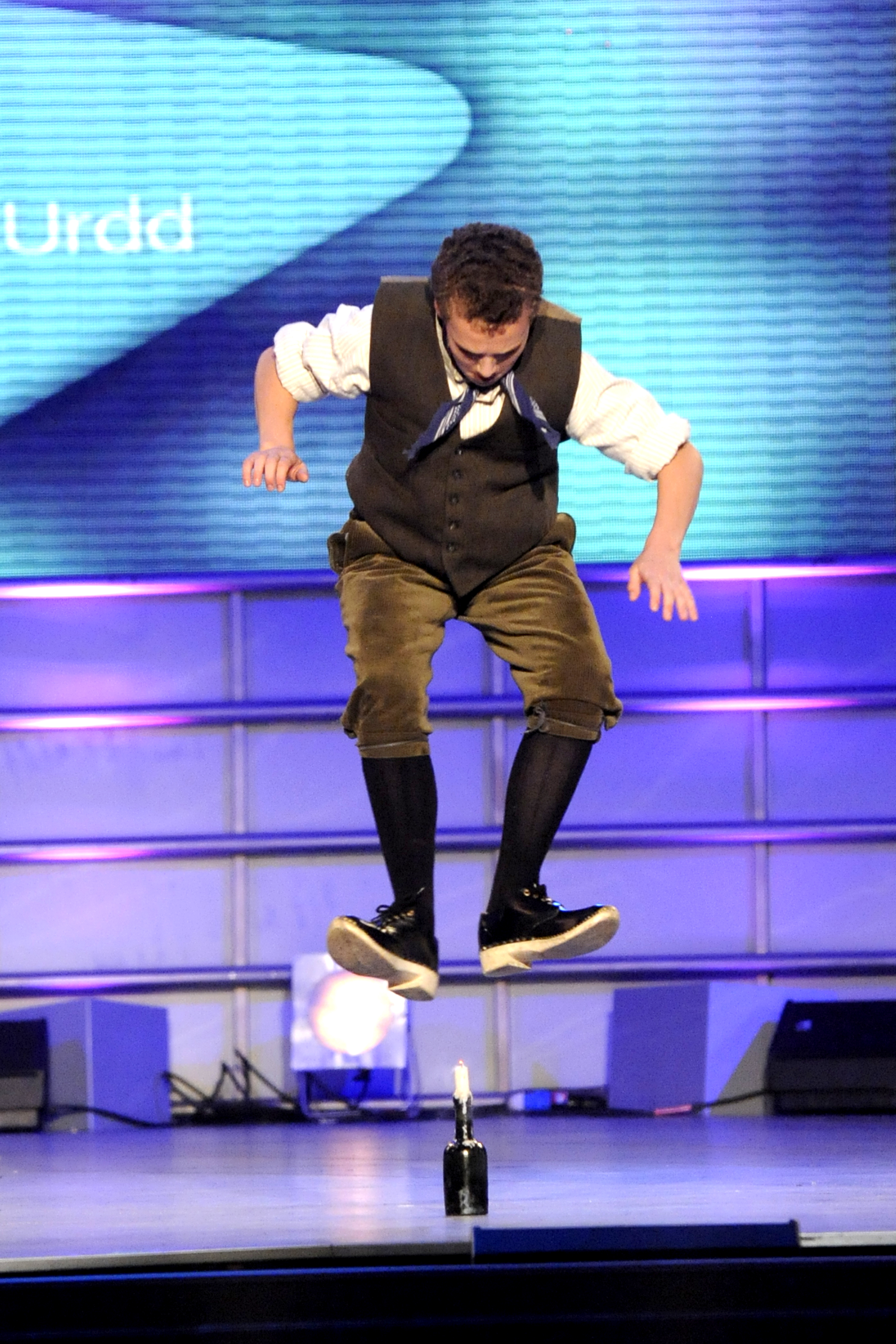
A young Welsh dancer extinguishes a candle with the sole edges of his clogs at the 2012 Urdd National Eisteddfod in Snowdonia (Eryri)

Welsh dance has a long reputation as more physical or difficult than other folk dances. In his recording of the Llangadfan dances, Williams Jones noted the relative difficulty of Welsh dance. He describes many of the dances as having "sharp twists and turns rendering them fiendishly difficult to perform well", and stated that they were probably "too fatiguing for the bodies and minds of the present generation, and requiring much skill and activity in the performance".

In 1798, Richard Warner noted the athleticism of the dances he witnessed at a Welsh ball which he described as "a contest of agility between two brothers, who danced two distinct hornpipes with so much power and muscle, variety of step and inflexible perseverance, as exceeded everything we had seen". Warner also noted that he and other English attendees were unable to participate at a Welsh dance due to the complex nature of the dances themselves.

Welsh stepdance is also seen as a competition of stamina and athleticism, which includes unique "tricks" such as high leaps into the air, snuffing out a candle with the shoes and toby stepping (kicking legs out in a squat position similarly to Cossack dancing).
