= Welsh Morris dance =

Dance tradition in Wales

Welsh Morris dance Dawns forys Cymru
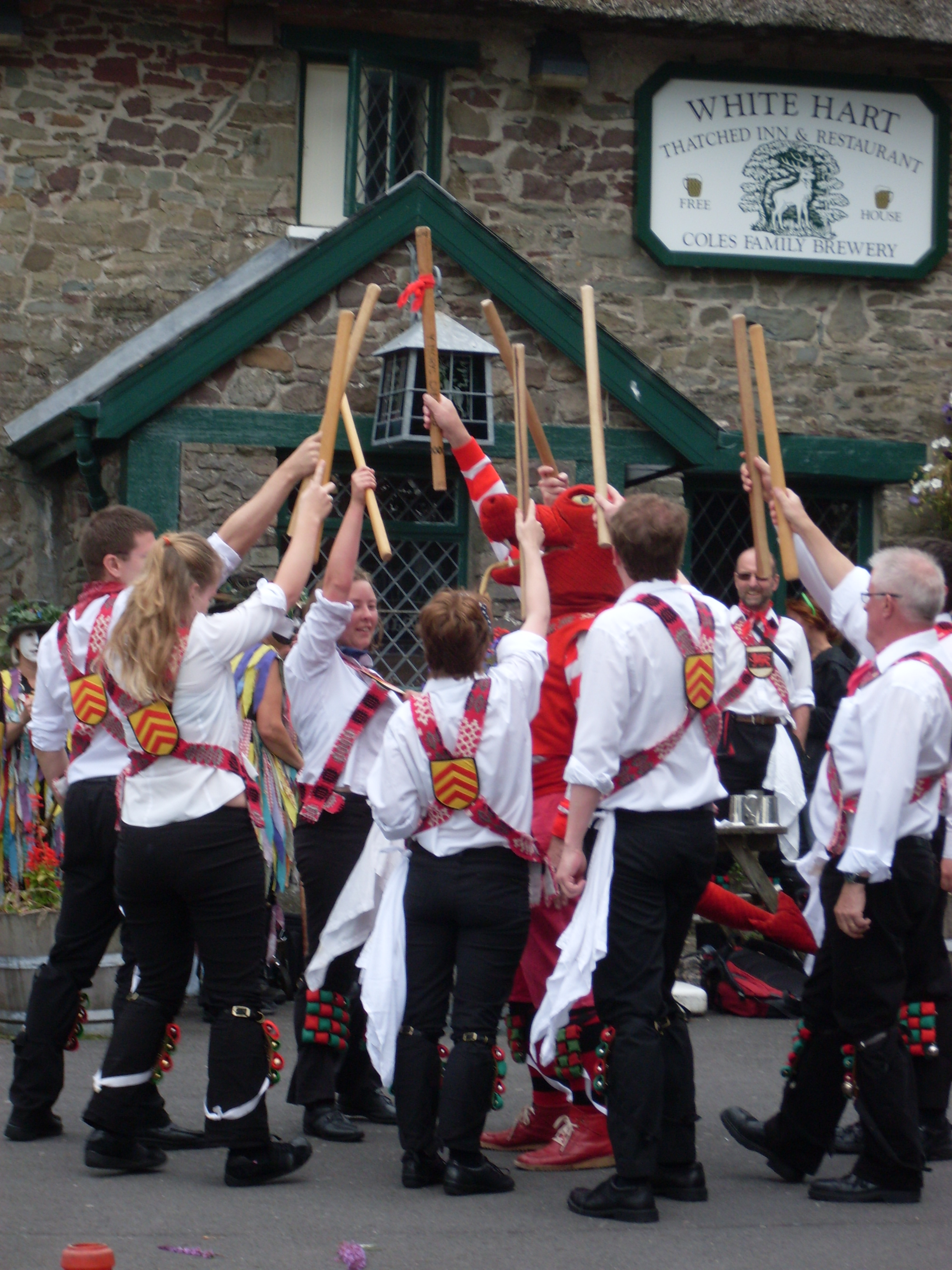
- Medium: Dance
- Originating culture: Welsh

Welsh Morris Dance (Welsh: Dawns forys Cymru) is the form of Morris dances associated with or originating in Wales.

== History ==
Some processional Welsh dances can be seen as having elements familiar in Morris dancing. The Cadi Ha is a processional dance in Flintshire and Denbighshire performed to celebrate May Day. While the dance itself is a living tradition which developed over more than two centuries, the dance is performed to a traditional song with the words:

[Hwp ha wen!]
Cadi Ha, Morys Stowt,
am yr uchla neidio,
Hwp dene fo!

Translation:

[Push the white summer!]
Cadi Ha, Stout Morris,
for the highest jumping,
push, there he is!

Lois Blake also noted that while they were commonly performed as progressive longways display dances, the Llanover Dances from Monmouthshire displayed "the influence of the Morris, both in form and movements".

Another traditional Welsh dance, the Mari Lwyd (Hunting the Wren) is performed to celebrate the connected with the Christmas and New Year period and features costumes, singing, ritual and customs comparable to Morris dances.

=== Twentieth century revivals ===
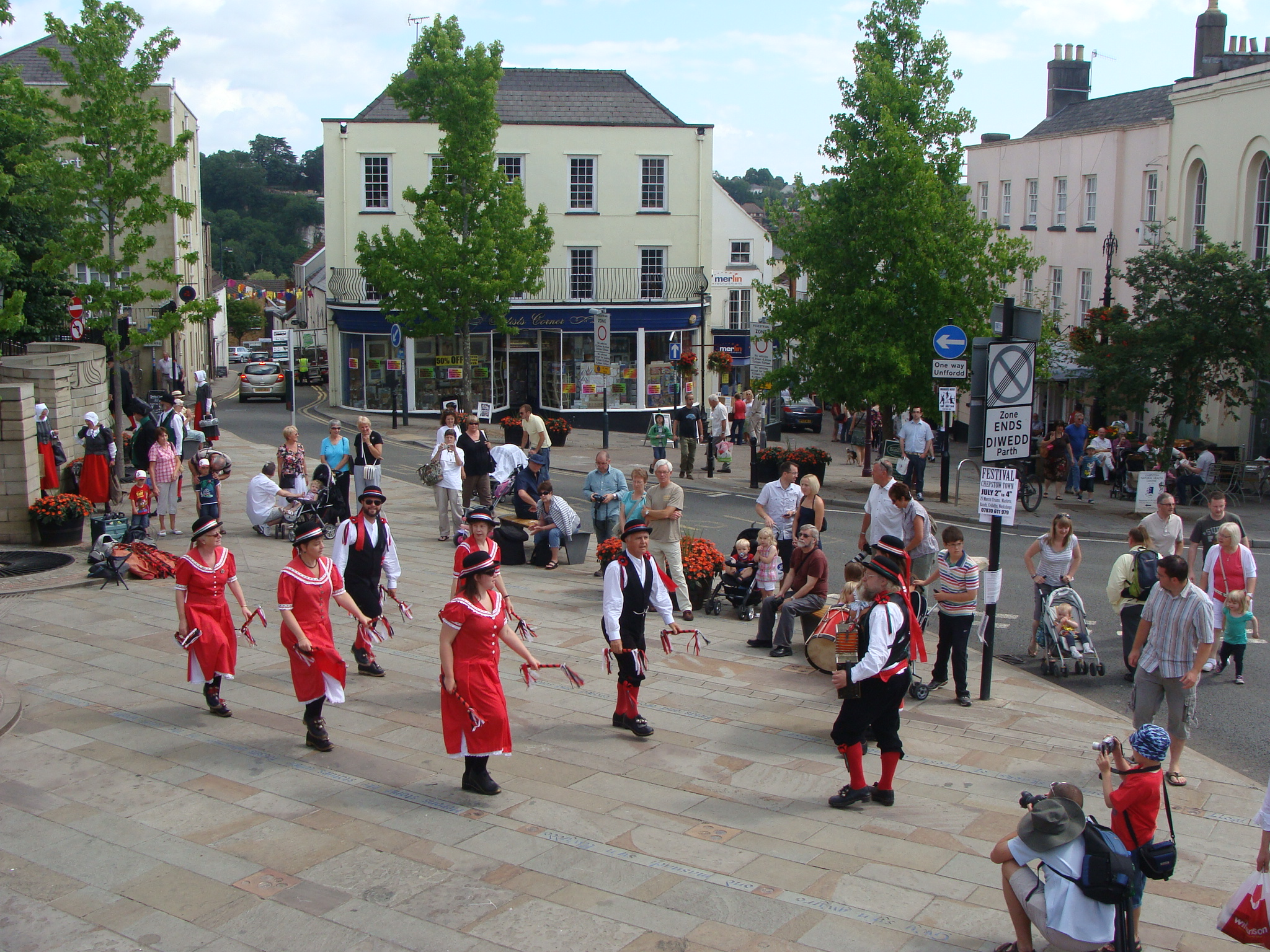
Morris Dancing at the Chepstow Festival

While traditional Welsh dance experienced a revival in the early twentieth century, a Morris dancing revival in the English border counties of Herefordshire, Worcestershire and Shropshire began in the 1960s.

Morris dancing in Wales was heavily influenced by this renewed academic interest and the publication of instructional texts such as Welsh Morris and Other Dances in 1937. However, the most influential event on Welsh morris was rediscovery and renewed popularity of the Nantgarw Dances, while these dances were recorded and published by academics such as Lois Blake and Ceinwen Thomas, a variety of dancers interpreted the texts in new ways. One particular dance from the Nantgarw tradition was Y Gaseg Eira, and while this dance would remain a central part of the Welsh morris, dancers built upon it and others to originate new dances that are now considered part of the Nantgarw tradition.

== Nantgarw Morris ==
Today there are five Morris dances that are commonly recognised as being a part of the Nantgarw tradition. The five dances are: Y Gaseg Eira (The Snow Mare), Hela'r Sgwarnog (Hunting the Hare), Ty Coch Caerdydd (Red House of Cardiff), Y Derwydd (The Druid) and Y Goron (The Crown).

=== Y Gaseg Eira (The Snow Mare) ===
This handkerchief dance has a pattern entirely peculiar to itself and was the first Nantgarw dance to see the light of day with the Cardiff Morris. The name of the dance is a Welsh idiom for a very large snowball, and it is so named because at one point in the dance the hand waving movements resemble the movements of somebody rolling a large snowball. This is the original Nantgarw dance and was being danced by Cardiff Morris by 1974. An article in the Welsh Folk Dance Magazine published in 1959 featured an article on this dance along with a photograph of a side performing it.

=== Hela'r Sgwarnog (Hunting the Hare) ===
This is the first of three dances which conform to a standard pattern; which can, with a little care, be memorised and need, therefore, no calling. Like Y Gaseg Eira it is a handkerchief dance. The current practise with the music is to use hornpipe time, which lends a lilt to the dance that some people find attractive. It had been added to the Nantgarw repertoire by 1984.

=== Ty Coch Caerdydd (The Red House of Cardiff) ===
Sixteen sticks lend a certain weight to the stick bag, if not the proceedings. The sticks are held skiing-fashion (as in downhill, not slalom or cross-country) and are brought up in front of the face to clash. It was being danced by 1984.

=== Y Derwydd (The Druid) ===
Previously known as Y Gamel (The Camel) until it was renamed after the tune it is danced to. There are only eight sticks in this dance and no clashing except in the chorus. The dance pattern is identical to that of Hunting the Hare, even down to the half-heys in the chorus, except that the corner figures are completely replaced with Stars. It was put together in 1991.

=== Y Goron (The Crown) ===
This is a stick dance based around circular hays.

== Nos Galan (New Year's Eve) ==
Another processional Welsh dance often used in Morris in the Nos Galan. Unlike the other dances which take place in one location this dance takes the dancers from one place to another. It takes its name from an old Welsh carol, the tune for which was used for the melody of "Deck the Halls".

== Moves ==
The figures can be summarised as Foot Up, Corners Change, Top Hey, Bottom Hey and Circular Hey, with usually a distinctive verse figure unique to each dance.

There is double step throughout, except when 'chipping' (hopping in one spot whilst simultaneously rotating). The basic pattern is two double steps followed by four capers. There had been a tendency to truncate the second double step and leap straight into the capers, leading to a loss of balance and poise. The hand movements are straight up-and-down, with Adderbury-style circular movements at waist level for the capers. In the 'chipping' sequences in Y Gaseg Eira and Hunting the Hare the arms are raised in turn and in time with the single stepping which accompanies it.

== See also ==
- Culture of Wales
- Morris Dancing
- Welsh dance
