= Catherine Margretta Thomas =

Welsh folk dancer

Catherine Margretta Thomas was a Welsh folk dancer and is known for recording the Nantgarw tradition of Welsh dance.

== Early life ==
The Twyn Chapel (now a municipal office building) in Caerphilly, where Catherine attended many dances in her early childhood

Catherine Margaretta Thomas was born in 1880 in the village of Nantgarw. Her parents were Daniel and Hannah Davies. Catherine was an active participant of the chapel's cultural activities, and was said to have been an exceptional athlete. Her daughter, Ceinwen Thomas recalled her mother participating in races, but was made to start up to 50 paces behind the other competitors even in her 30s and still "she always won". It is at these chapel events that the young Catherine enjoyed watching the local dances as they were performed in an open space below Twyn Chapel in Caerphilly, at Y Groes Wen and Nantgarw itself.

The young Catherine would persuade the other children to reproduce the dances she had witnessed with her, out of sight of the grown-ups. However due to the hostility of the independent churches in Wales, with Catherine recalling in later life that someone would draw their curtains and lock the doors so that they could dance in their own house. Catherine' mother was very averse to her daughter going to see these dances, but the young Catherine would persuade her father to accompany her as well as being taken to the dances at local fairs by her grandmother. Dancing was also a feature of the Noson ddifyr held at the homes of friends and neighbours. Even Catherine's disapproving mother would duteously take her turn in hosting a Noson Ddifyr at the family home. Catherine would later remember that her mother would cry as she watched a performance of the "Morfa Rhuddlan" dance (a lament for Llywelyn ap Gruffudd), while her father would whisper explanations of the dancer’s actions to the young Catherine and her brother Emwnt, sometimes accompanying with music. Despite this, the traditional dances had been practically eradicated in Nantgarw by the time Catherine Margretta Thomas was in her teens.

== Nantgarw tradition ==
Dancing had died hard if inconsistently by 1911 when Catherine Margretta Thomas' daughter, Ceinwen Thomas (later Dr. Ceinwen Thomas), was born. But the influence of Nonconformism waned and by the time Ceinwen Thomas was attending school she was discussing the tradition of dancing in Nantgarw with her mother. Although she would become a linguist in adult life with no knowledge of dance terminology, Ceinwen tried to persuade her mother to let her write down whatever she remembered of the dances.

Catherine was reluctant at first because she felt her memory was imperfect but encouraged by her daughter, she attempted to describe the dances of her youth, especially the Dawns Glamai and Dawns Gwyl Ifan (which she called Dawns Nantgarw and Dawns Y Groes Wen after the chapels she most associated the dance with). Despite her protestations Ceinwen would write down her mother's recollections anyway, feeling that they formed a genuine tradition that was worth recording.

Ceinwen believed that a folk-dance expert may be able to reconstruct the rest of the tradition, from the dances and fragments her mother had remembered. As such, she discussed her work with Walter Dowding of the Welsh Folk Dance Society with Dowding introducing her to Doris Freeman. Together Catherine Margretta Thomas, Ceinwen Thomas and Doris Freeman worked to notate the dance steps from the traditional dances that Catherine Margretta Thomas could remember. These notes were then passed on to the Welsh Folk Dance Society by Ceinwen Thomas. A complete set of the dance notation for Y Gaseg Eira was published, alongside the tune Ymdeithgan Gwŷr Penllyn (March of the Men of Penllyn), in the 1959/60 Welsh Folk Dance Magazine.

The reconstructed dances of Dawns Blodau Nantgarw, Dawns Gwyl Ifan and Rali Twm Sion were published in 1950, "Three Nantgarw Dances" was published by Lois Blake with arrangements by W. S. Gwynn Williams and distributed by Cwmni Cyhoeddi Gwynn. While these dances would become known under the collective "the Nantgarw tradition", the dances that Catherine recorded were from a wider area. Catherine associated the Dawns Gwyl Ifan with Groeswen, Dawns y Blodau Dawns Glamai and Y Gaseg Eira. While Catherine remained reluctant that such work by her daughter and now the Welsh Folk Dance Society should be based purely on her own childhood memories, Ceinwen persuaded her to go over the notes she had made one Friday evening in the kitchen of the family home. At seven o’clock the mother and daughter team started with notes for the Dawns Glamai, with Ceinwen attempting to recreate the dance from her own notes. Catherine quickly and excitedly corrected her daughter with Ceinwen amending her notes accordingly. By midnight, after an evening of trial and error Catherine became sure that the dance had been recreated in the right order, announcing to her daughter "That’s it, I’ve remembered it all. There isn’t anymore". The following day, the two used the same method to successfully recreate the Dawns Gwyl Ifan, and Catherine became much more confident in the dances being the subject of study.

As such, Ceinwen brought in Doris Freeman who's approach to each dance was more detailed than Catherine and Ceinwen had been. Freeman wanted to match each dance to music, after some thought Catherine placed the Dawns Gwyl Ifan with Hela’r Sgyfarnog and Dawns y Blota with the old Welsh air Nos Galan. Ceinwen would later state that Catherine was not a musician, disliked instrumental music and never learnt to read music. In spite of this, the three woman brought in a musician, Lilian Jones and found that the music Catherine had identified would indeed match the measure for each dance. Freeman pushed Catherine on other dances of her youth, such as those she had seen at the fairs in Caerphilly and Tongwynlais, the dances at Noson Ddifyr and at other celebrations such as the harvest supper. Catherine was now able to recall these dances with more quickly and with relative ease. These dances include the Dawns y Pelau and the dance Catherine's grandmother would request at Caerphilly fair, Rali Twm Sion (now known as Ffair Caerffili in the Nantgarw Tradition, because of Catherine's inability to remember the name).

Ceinwen passed on her notations to Walter Dowding of the Welsh Folk Dance Society. Dowding translated the notes into English and reformatted them into more recognisable instructions for dancers. Finally, Lois Blake would get in touch with Catherine, visiting her at her home on several occasions. Ceinwen thought that while her notations were "very unprofessional", the work by the Welsh Folk Dance Society, and the central role that Lois Blake played in interpreting them. The notes were eventually published through the Welsh Folk Dance Society in 1954.

=== Criticism ===
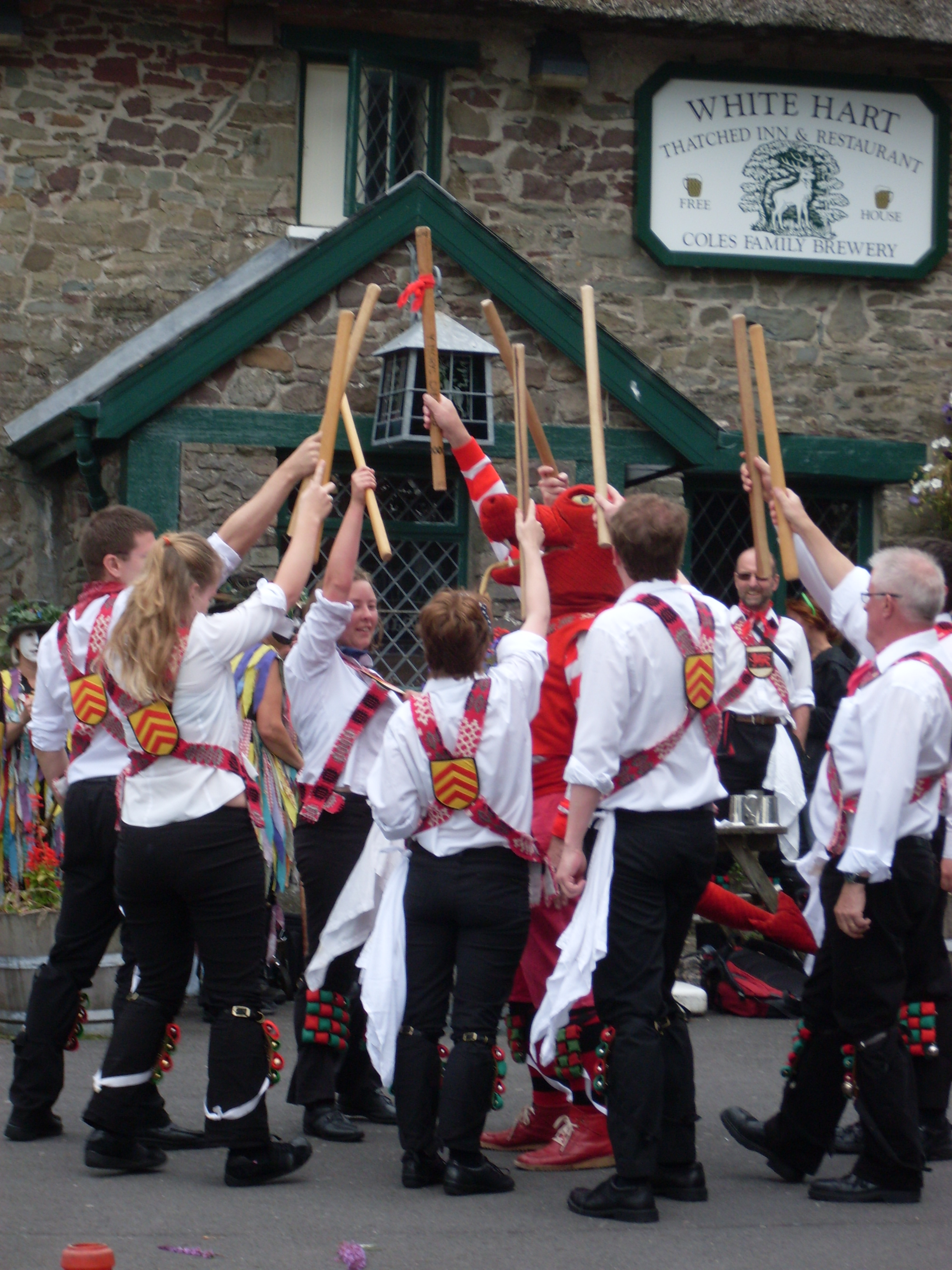
The Cardiff Morris performing a modern Morris dance derived from the anamnesis of Catherine Margretta Thomas

Catherine had been reluctant for her daughter to make a written record of the dances based on her own recollection as by that time, she only remembered snippets and believed that she was probably remembering them imperfectly or in the wrong order. Following the successful recreation of the tradition, Vaughan Roderick (the great-grandson of a minister who oversaw the Nantgarw and Groeswen chapels in the 1880s), questioned Ceinwen as to why only her mother could recollect them in such detail. Decades later in 2009, Roderick had become the BBC Welsh Affairs Editor, and repeated his criticism, following the performance of a Cerdd Dant at the Smithsonian Folklife Festival in Washington D.C. In his BBC blog, Roderick again questioned the validity of the dances and linked them with what he saw as the dangers of Romantic nationalism.

Ceinwen responded to some of the criticism by noting that her mother had a photographic memory, with the ability to study an embroidery in a shop window and exactly reproduce it in minutest detail and that the guilt and disapproval associated with the dance she so enjoyed would intensify the dances in her consciousness.

== Personal life ==
Catherine was an accomplished singer and sang with local choirs but never learned to read music. Despite Catherine's intense interest in Welsh dance as a child, she would be greatly affected by the 1904–1905 Welsh revival, becoming much more outwardly puritanical in her religious outlook. Catherine even attempted to shield her young children from sinful activities such as dancing and the new cinemas. Her perspective had shifted by the time Ceinwen was a student, and she even made frocks for her daughter to attend her College dances.

In later years, Catherine would often attend performance of the Nantgarw Tradition and "never failed to be amazed and moved when she saw modern presentations of the dances because they had been so successfully resurrected". She especially enjoyed the Dawns Gwyl Ifan and Dawns Glamai as they had little changed from her childhood. However, she was critical of the male dancers telling her daughter "Beth sy ar y dynon i bod nhw’n dawnso fel mynwod? Odd y dynon slawar dydd yn dawnso fel dynon!" (English: "What is wrong with the men that they dance like women? The men long ago used to dance like men!")
