= Susannah Berrington Gruffydd Richards =

Welsh linguist, teacher and academic

Susannah Berrington Gruffydd Richards (also known as SB Gruffydd Richards or Mrs Gruffydd Richards, 1854-1952) was a Welsh Harpist. She was an important figure in the revival of Welsh dance, specifically the Llanover Dances in the early twentieth century.

== Early life ==
Gruffydd Richards's father, Thomas Gruffydd of Llangynidr, moved to Llanover to become the Court harpist at Llanover House and she was said to be the seventh generation of renowned Welsh harpists in her family and the third to be employed at Llanover.

== Work at Llanover House ==
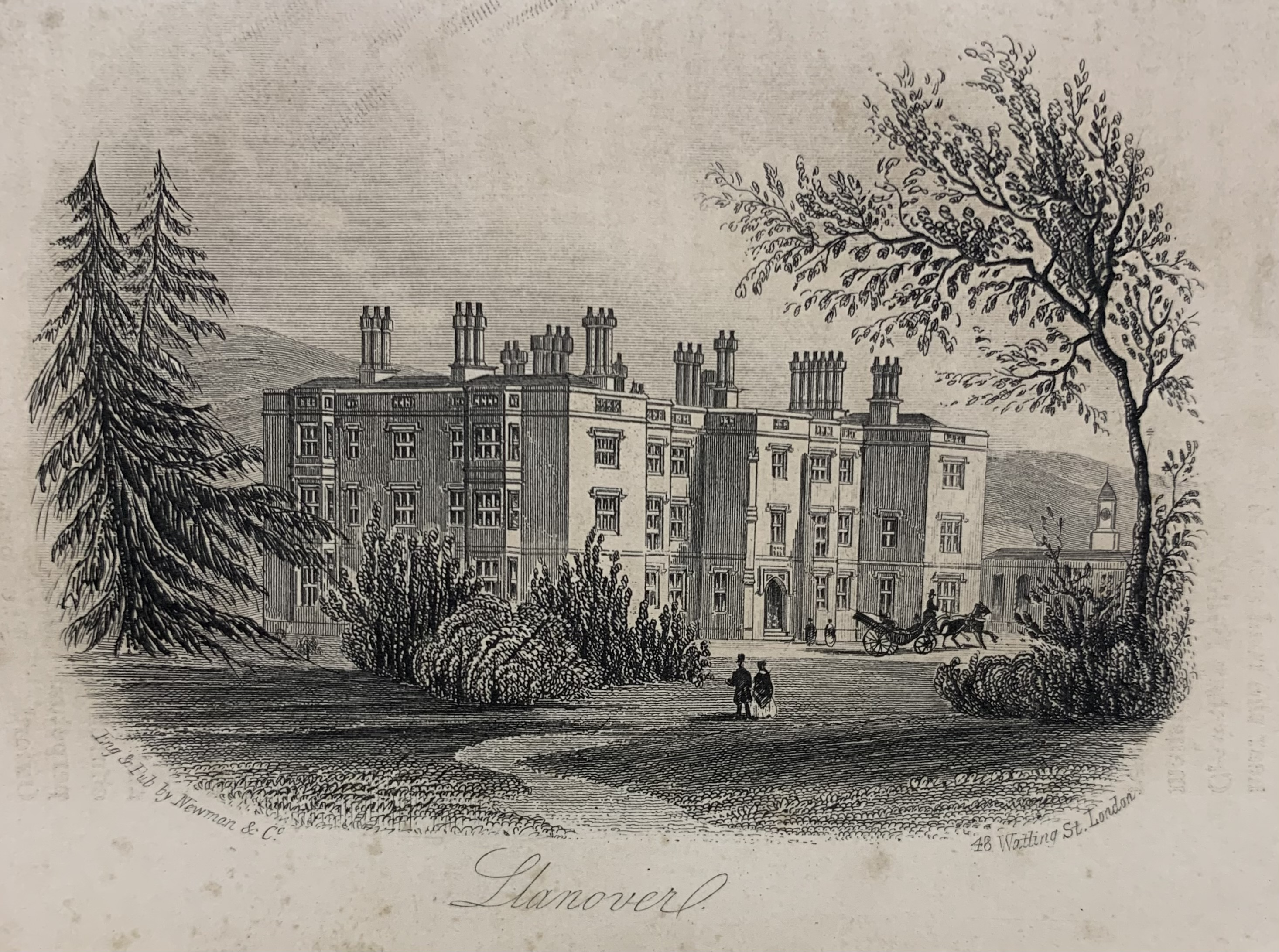
Llanover House, Monmouthshire

While an accomplished harpist in her own right, Lady Llanover (1802 – 1896) employed a professional Harpist at her estate throughout her long life. The first such harpist, John Wood Jones was followed in the role by his student, Thomas Gruffydd of Llangynidr who in turn, was followed by his daughter, on his passing in 1887.

While her partially blind father, Thomas Gruffydd, is said to have trained eighteen harpists as part of the cultural revival instigated by Lady Llanover, Gruffydd Richards was also paid a monthly salary as a harp teacher and continued to be employed by the family after Lady Llanover's death.

== Later career ==
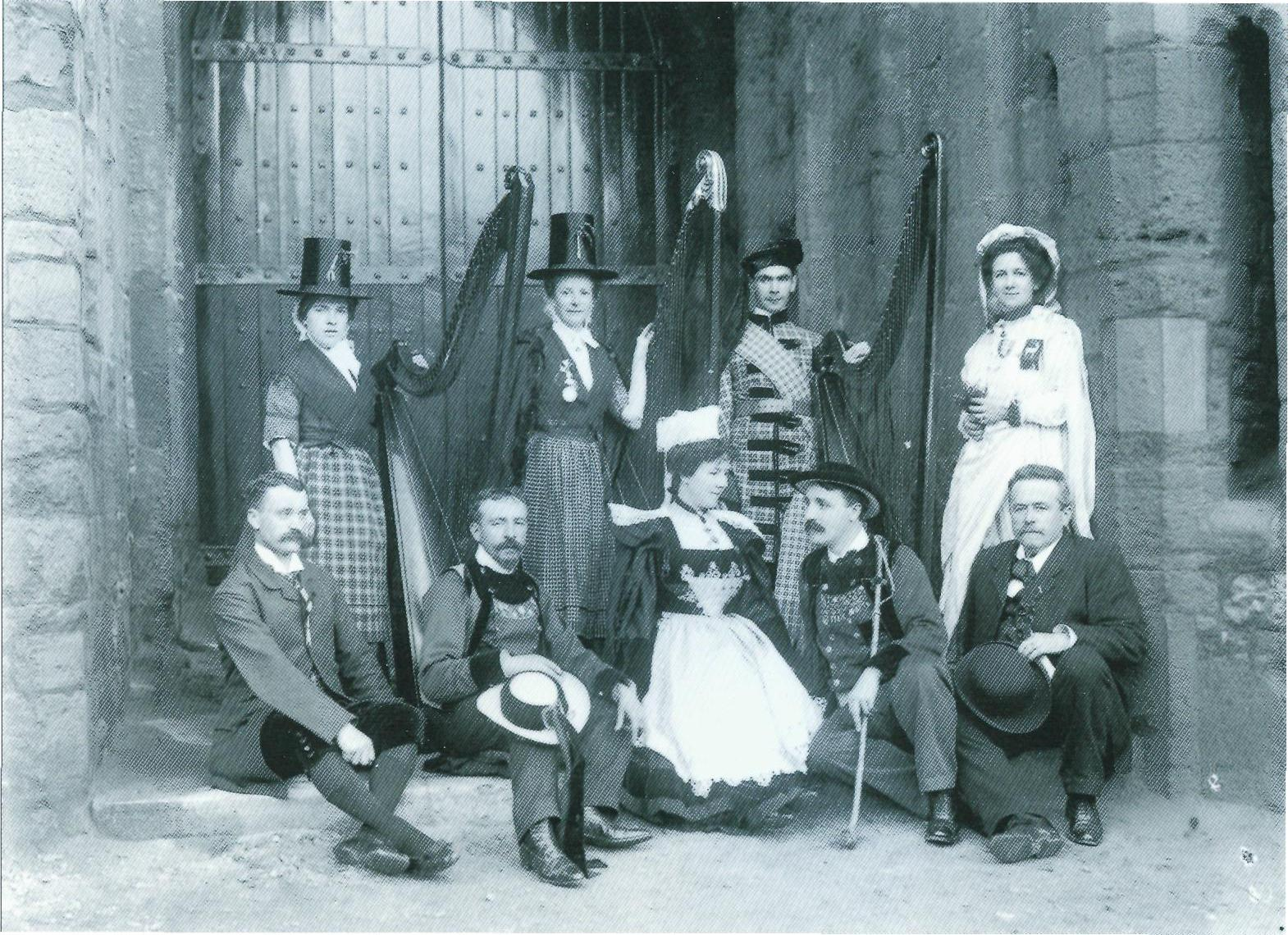
Delegates at the Pan-Celtic Congress, Caernarfon, 1904. Gruffydd Richards is in the back row, second from left.

As a musician, Gruffydd Richards would become recognised as the "chief harpist of Gwent". Her work teaching the Llanover Dances to local villagers and school children as late as 1918, meant that she was solely responsible for their continuation of the dances her father had composed as part of the revival at Llanover House.

Gruffydd Richards proved to be invaluable to the renaissance of Welsh dance in the twentieth century, and was the principal source for academics, publishers and distributers. Hugh Mellor's 1935 book, Welsh Folk Dance, was primarily based on information he had obtained from Mrs Gruffydd Richards in 1926:

"I soon saw that we had something distinctive from any other known dance in either England or Ireland, and when I realised that I was engaged in noting down the first traditional Welsh dance that had ever been put down on paper I felt my responsibilities and determined that it should be put down exactly as Mrs Richards danced it."

— Hugh Mellor on the imprtance of transcribing the dances Mrs Gruffydd Richards had demonstarted.

The version of Rhif Wyth published by Ann Griffiths was from a manuscript Gruffydd Richards had gifted to a resident of Llanover decades earlier.
