= Llangadfan Dances =

Dance tradition in Wales

The Llangadfan Dances (Welsh: Dawnsfeydd Llangadfan) are a collection of traditional Welsh dances originating from the Llangadfan area of north Wales.

== History ==
=== Origins ===
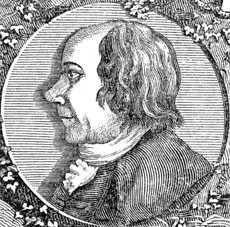
William Jones of Llangadfan

The eighteenth century saw much change to Welsh society and Welsh culture. As such, Welsh radicals such as William Jones actively attempted to record and revive the dance traditions of their own areas.

"The dances formerly in this country were by parties of six, longways, and round about 40 years ago they extended to more than four or five parishes and about 15 years ago they were wholly laid aside. It begins to revive a little at pre- sent but as it requires some skill and application to learn it handsomely and the experienced practitioners are either dead or superannuated it will be entirely lost to the next generation."

— William Jones on the decline of Welsh dancing in his time.

Jones assiduously interviewed the elderly folk around the community of Llangadfan and was also a notable antiquary and authority on manuscripts. Among Jones' collaborators in this work was his own father, William Sion Dafydd who recalled the dances he had learned in his own youth during the sixteenth century. Through this work, Jones rediscovered numerous dances together with the ancient airs, melodies and stanzas that accompanied them.

=== 20th Century revival ===
While William Jones was responsible for the Llangadfan dances surviving, his work enabled revivalists to authenticate the historicity of dances throughout Wales, as well as create new folk dances as part of a living tradition. By the early twentieth century, the Dances were the subject of academic analysis and were republished in works by Hugh Mellor and W.S. Gwynn Williams.

In 1936, W.S. Gwynn Williams published another work, The Llangadfan Dances with Lois Blake. This publication proved highly influential during the revival of interest in Welsh dance during the mid-twentieth century, and it is by this name that the corpus of William Jones' work has come to be known. A second edition of "The Llangadfan Dances" was published in 1954, which expanded on the original work and corrected a number of errors. Today, the Llangadfan Dances (along with the Llanover Dances and the Nantgarw Dances) are an integral part of the Welsh dance repertoire.

== Difficulty ==
The Llangadfan dances have had a reputation as more physical or difficult to perform since they were first recorded. William Jones even recorded his concerns in his initial writings, stating that the dances that had been enjoyed by older generations of Welsh farmers and peasantry were "too fatiguing for the bodies and minds of the present generation, and requiring much skill and activity in the performance", adding that the "sharp twists and turns rendering them fiendishly difficult to perform well".
