= Llanover =

Village in Monmouthshire, Wales

Coordinates: 51°46′N 2°59′W

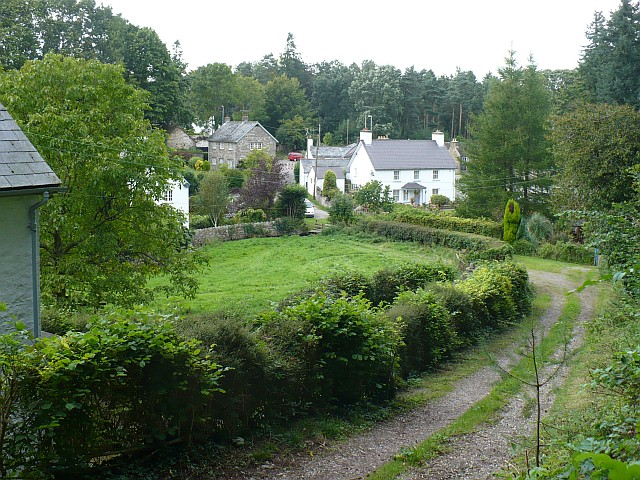
Llanover village

Llanover (/ləˈnoʊvər/ lə-NOH-vər; Welsh: Llanofer [ɬaˈnɔvɛr]) is a village in the community of Goetre Fawr in Monmouthshire, South East Wales.

== Name ==
The name of the village derives from an earlier Welsh form Llanfyfor, made up of llan 'enclosure, church' and the personal name Myfor.

== Location ==
Llanover is located four miles south of Abergavenny just off the A4042 road to Pontypool. The community includes the separate hamlets of Llanfair Kilgeddin, Llanvihangel Gobion, Llanddewi Rhydderch and The Bryn (a.k.a. Llangattock Nigh Usk).

== Governance ==
An electoral ward exists in the same name. This ward includes the parish of Llanarth and elects a county councillor to Monmouthshire County Council. The total ward population at the 2011 census was 2,284. There was formerly a community called "Llanover", in 2022 its boundaries changed so that the village of Llanover became part of Goetre Fawr and the community of "Llanover" was renamed Gobion Fawr. The population taken at the 2011 census was 1,392.

== History & amenities ==
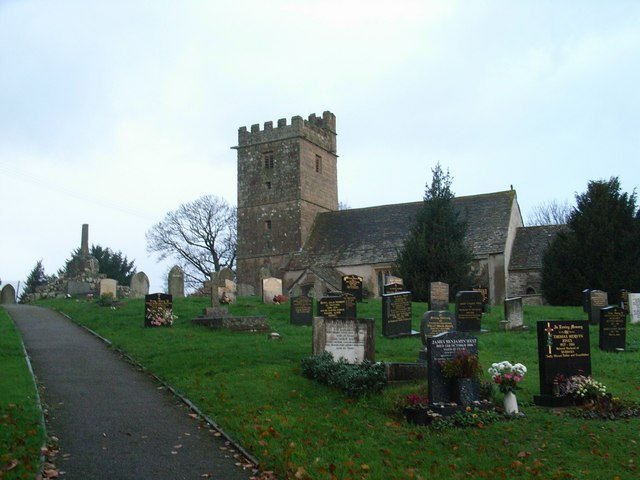
St Bartholomew's church

Llanover is an estate village associated with the Hall family. Augusta Lady Llanover lived locally all her life and left her mark on the village and the surrounding Llanover House estate which remains privately owned. Her husband Sir Benjamin Hall became Baron Llanover. Her sisters, diplomatic hostess and author Frances Bunsen and Emily grew up there, educated by their mother Georgina Mary Ann, (née Port) (1771–1850), with Augusta and Frances surviving to become co-heiresses to the estate from their father Benjamin Waddington. Llanover House was demolished in 1936 but the park survives relatively intact and is designated at Grade II* on the Cadw/ICOMOS Register of Parks and Gardens of Special Historic Interest in Wales.

St Bartholomew's Church, Llanover is a grade II* listed building. The River Usk flows close by, and to the west lies the Brecon and Monmouthshire canal, a scenic recreational boating route. More recently, Llanover is the birthplace of Penelope Fillon, the wife of François Fillon, former Prime Minister of France and candidate in the 2017 French presidential elections.

== See also ==
- Llanover Dances
