= Welsh stepdance =

Welsh clog dancing

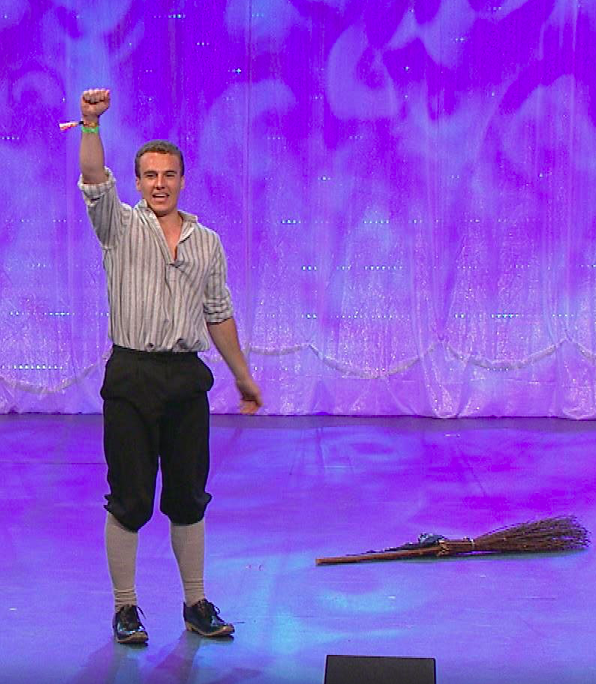
- Welsh clog dancer on stage at the National Eisteddfod in Bodedern, 2017.
- Medium: Dance
- Originating culture: Welsh
- Originating era: 18th century

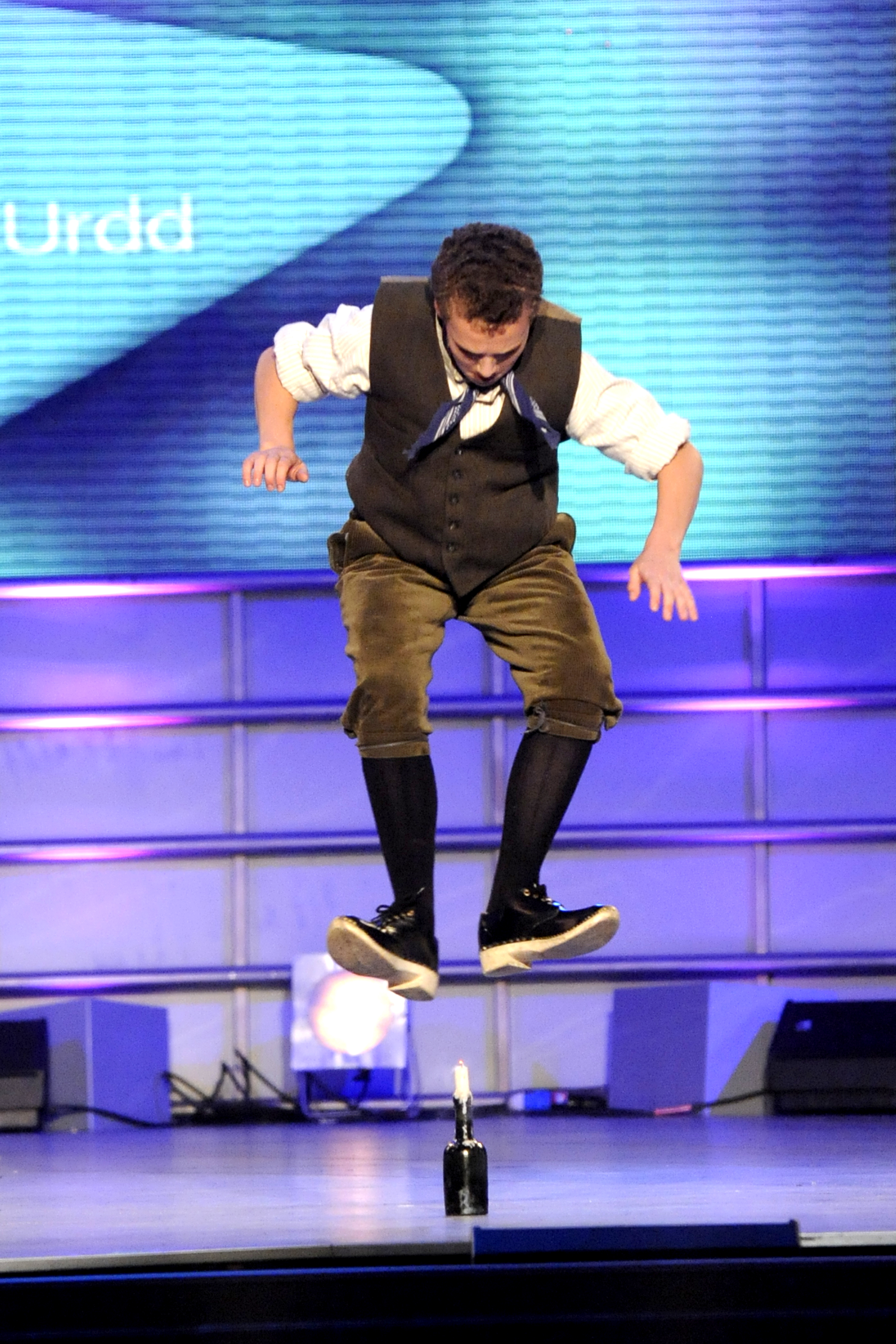
A Welsh solo clog dancer extinguishing a candle using the sole edges of his clogs at the National Urdd Eisteddfod in Snowdonia (Eryri), 2012.

The Welsh stepdance (Welsh: Dawns stepio) or Welsh clog dance (Welsh: Clocsio) is a traditional Welsh form of dance involving clog shoes and percussive movement of the feet and athletic movements. It is typically done to Welsh traditional music and wearing traditional Welsh costume, but not always.

The Welsh stepdance is an unbroken tradition that was typically performed by slate quarry workmen and farmers. Dancers would often compete with each other to prove who had the most impressive dancing, stamina and athleticism. Welsh clog dancing also includes "tricks" which makes it unique compared to other forms of step dancing such as Irish dancing, Scottish dancing and English clog dancing. These tricks can include, but are not limited to; snuffing out a candle flame using the wooden soles of the shoes, toby stepping (kicking legs out in a squat position similarly to Cossack dancing) and high leaps into the air such as straddle jumping.

Clogging does not simply involve dancing whilst wearing clogs. Clogging involves producing a variety of stronger or lighter sounds and a mixture of rhythms using both feet, which showcases the stepping dexterity. A talented clogger is able to make a variety of sounds by utilising different regions of the clog which include the toe, heel and sides of the clog against each other or other objects. Clogging can be performed on wood and slate and can be accompanied or unaccompanied.

== History ==
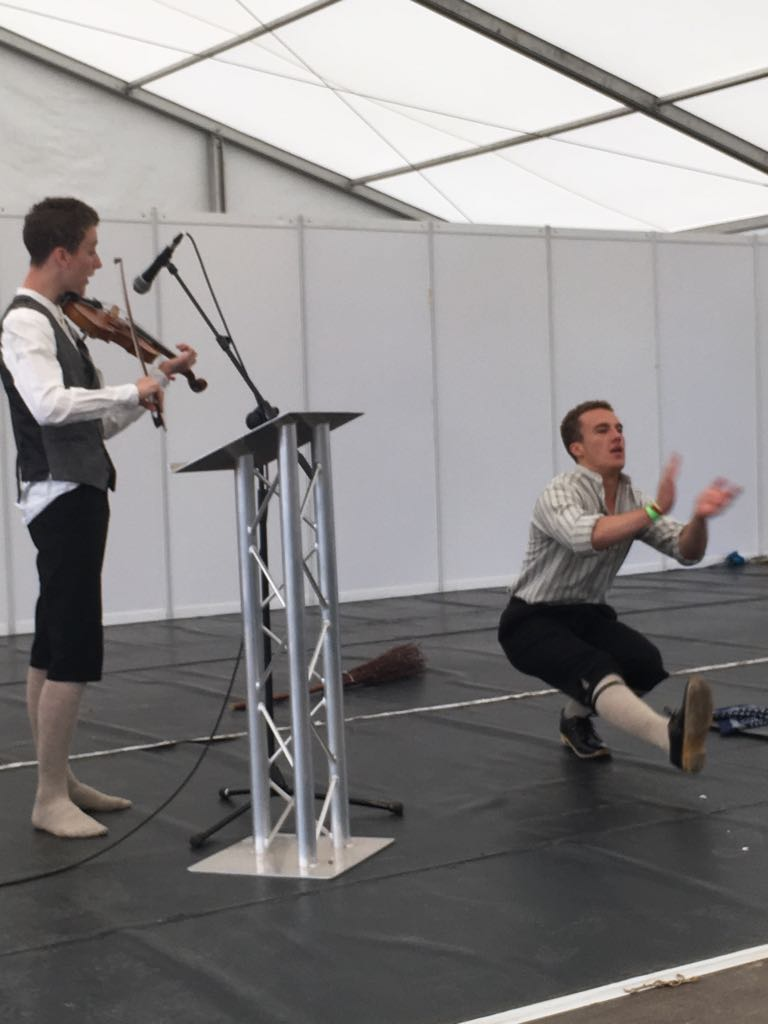
A Welsh clog dancer performing a "toby" at a preliminary solo competition of the 2017 National Eisteddfod in Bodedern.

It is generally accepted that Flemish weavers introduced clogs to the British Isles in the 13th century but the more recent description of the clog in Wales includes a leather upper and dates back to the industrial revolution. These are hardy shoes that can last up to 7 years for an individual in a low-income family.

=== Tradition of clogging ===
Clog dancing in Wales originates mostly from slate quarries and farmers also. In a film shot in 1959, Gwenyth Thomas, who revived the tradition in Porthmadog, credited its richness to the worldwide experiences of sailors who came to pick up slate from the Ffestiniog quarries. Workers would attempt to out-perform each other during work breaks by performing more extravagant and striking "steps" and "tricks" to impress their co-workers. The slate that was produced in the quarries could be used as a platform to clog dance and slate is still used even today in Eisteddfod competitions.

Typically clog dancers prefer ash wood because it gives a clearer and more crisp sound however, these are also the least hardwearing. Clog dancing is the only unbroken dancing tradition in Wales following the discouragement of other forms of dance during the religious revivals of the 18th and 19th centuries. Stable lofts, taverns and fairs were also popular environments for clog dancing and competitive clog dancing, with the winners typically being men who performed steps or tricks which could not be replicated by others. There may have been a period where the step dance and the trick dance were separate competitions however in modern competition they are performed as one dance or routine which typically includes a handkerchief, broom and candle. It is likely that clog dancing survived with an unbroken tradition because it was easier to continue dancing as an individual on the hearth or stable loft. The travelling community in Wales are also associated with maintaining the tradition. The middle of the 20th century saw the revival of interest in clog dancing and significant dancing figures emerged such as Hywel Wood who was a traveller from Parc near Bala and another dancer named Caradog Pugh hailing from Llanuwchlyn. There are only occasional references to women dancing in literature. Huw Williams, a recent clog-dancing figure suggests that Welsh clog dancers pass on their skills by observation and emulation. Steps also have their own name although these can vary by individual and area.

== Dancing style ==
Welsh clog dancing is unique and is not a revival, as it is danced in the style of the unbroken tradition." Welsh clog dancing is stylistically distinct from English clog dancing with new steps and "tricks" constantly being invented as part of Eisteddfod competitions. For example, extinguishing a candle, toby stepping (propelling the feet forward alternatively in a squat position), straddle jumps, handkerchief jumps, stepping and jumping over brooms are performed. Welsh clog dancing, especially solo dancing has evolved to become much more dynamic than English clog dancing.

== Usage ==
Clog dancing is an integral part of both the local and national eisteddfod tradition in Wales. Competitions since the 1960s have extended to dancing duets and trios which meant that groups could recreate on stage the true tradition where one dancer was trying to out-dance the other. Group clogging has also become an integral part of the eisteddfodau and dancing tradition. Competition can be energetic with the dancers leaping over brooms as seen in the National Eisteddfod Male Welsh Clog Dancing Competition. Notable dancing groups include Natgarw Dancers hailing from the Pontypridd area and Talog dancers from Carmarthen. Both groups have enjoyed significant success in National Eisteddfod competitions. Nantgarw dancers have also had significant success in international competitions such as the Llangollen International Eisteddfod in Wales, Lorient Folk Festival in France and Mallorca World Folk Festival in Spain.

Welsh clog dancing is still taught to children and adults to this day and has even been used as a fitness exercise course.
