= Nantgarw Dances =

Dance tradition in Wales

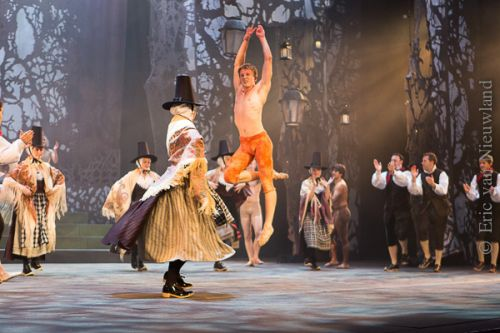
Dawnswyr Nantgarw (Nantgarw Dancers) dance alongside Ballet Cymru in WOMEX, Millennium Centre, Cardiff.

The Nantgarw Dances (Welsh: Dawnsfeydd Nantgarw) is a tradition in Welsh dance that originates from the area around Nantgarw in the South Wales Valleys.

== History ==
=== Origins ===
What are today known as the Nantgarw Dances were originally performed at chapels, fayres and Welsh cultural events until sometime in the 1880s. Such dances were a feature of chapel life at Nantgarw and Y Groeswen, attracting people from Pentyrch, Rhydfelen, Upper Boat and Taffs Well. One of the attendees at the dances was a young Catherine Margretta Thomas. Catherine Margretta was born in 1880, around the time that the rapid decline in Welsh Dance was beginning. The decline was due in part to the rise in Nonconformity in Wales, and the open hostility of some to tradition aspects of Welsh culture. Catherine' own mother was not keen on her daughter going to the dances, but Catherine was able to attend with her father or grandparents, and greatly enjoying displays, and could still recall seventy years later where the dancers rested and changed and where in the field certain groups would perform.

== Revival ==
The Nantgarw dance traditions had died out entirely by 1911 when Catherine' daughter, Ceinwen Thomas was born.

Ceinwen would discuss the tradition of dancing in Nantgarw with her mother while at school in the 1920s. As an adult, Ceinwen began to make rudimentary notations of the styles and movements her mother could recall from her early youth. Ceinwen would become a professor of linguistics, and had no formal training in dance or dance notation. As such, she sought the help of Walter Dowding at the Welsh Folk Dance Society, who believed that Catherine's recollections had great merit and put Ceinwen in touch with Doris Freeman. Together the three women worked to notate the dance steps from the traditional dances that Catherine could remember, with the composer, W. S. Gwynn Williams setting new arrangements to the dances, and Welsh National Folk Dance Society publishing the dances, along with Ceinwen's notations in 1954.

W. S. Gwynn Williams composed new arrangements for the first publication of reconstructed dances in 1950

=== Nantgarw Dances today ===
Today the Nantgarw Dances form a central aspect of Welsh dance, along with the Llanover Dances and the Llangadfan Dances. The dances encompasses both handkerchief and stick dances. The dances call for eight dancers in four pairs.

=== Criticism ===
There has been skepticism expressed over the claims by Dr. Ceinwen Thomas that the dances which her mother recalled were authentic and original Welsh dances reflecting a long and integral Welsh culture of folk dancing. The BBC Welsh Affairs Editor Vaughan Roderick wrote in a blog in 2009 that he doubted the history of these dances. He questioned why only Margretta Thomas had any recollection of these dances being performed. He wrote that his great-grandfather had been a minister in Nantgarw in the 1880s but had not seen these dances.
