= Welsh Folk Dance Society =

Dancing organisation in Wales

- Formation: 1949
- Type: Nonprofit organisation
- Purpose: Research, study and promotion of Welsh folk dance
- Region served: Wales
- Website: https://dawnsio.cymru/en/

The Welsh Folk Dance Society (Welsh: Cymdeithas Ddawns Werin Cymru) is an organisation which supports, maintains and extends Welsh traditional dancing. It is also a registered charity.

== History ==
=== Formation ===
Welsh dance had tradition in Wales had declined sharply throughout the nineteenth century and may have been exterminated entirely had it not been for the revival which began in 1918, when the Llanover Reel became the first of a number of Welsh dances to be revived and transcribed. In the midst of this revival, a Welsh Folk Dance Society was initially formed in 1926 but disbanded soon afterwards, with no publications.

Following the successes of the English Folk Dance Society, a public meeting was held in The Castle, Shrewsbury, on Saturday, July 23, 1949, where the new Welsh Folk Dance Society was founded. The society was formed in order to both revive and promote old traditional Welsh dances and create new ones. Lois Blake was the society's first president.

"The objects of the Society shall be to study and make known generally Welsh folk dance material already collected and published, to coordinate Welsh folk dance activities and to make further research."

— Minutes of the open meeting held at Shrewsbury on Saturday 23 July 1949 to discuss the formation of the Welsh Folk Dance Society

=== Recording dances ===
After Ceinwen Thomas left college, she met Walter Dowding of the Welsh National Folk Dance Society. She told him about her mother's recollections of folk dancing in Nantgarw. He put her in touch with Doris Freeman. Together Catherine Margretta Thomas, Ceinwen Thomas and Doris Freeman worked to notate the dance steps from the traditional dances that Catherine Margretta Thomas could remember. These notes were then passed on to the Welsh National Folk Dance Society by Ceinwen Thomas.

=== Resurgence ===
Since the founding of the society, Welsh folk dancing has had significant success in Wales and abroad. Workshops, lectures and courses arranged by the society typically have significant attendance. Dance events at Eisteddfod's also draw significant audiences.

The Welsh Folk Dance Society celebrated its 70th anniversary in Pembroke on June 15, 2019. Celebrations included traditional Welsh dancing by multiple groups across Wales in traditional clothing near Cardigan castle.

== Publications ==
The society has produced a number of published works, including:

- Danwsiau yr ugeinfed ganrif - Twentieth century dances
- Cadw twmpath : cant arall o alawon dawnsio gwerin Cymreig = One hundred more Welsh folk dance tunes
- Dawns lleweni
- Dawnsiau bardd y brenin : circa 1785 = Dances of the king's harper
- Dawnsiau ffair Nantgarw
- Dawnsfeydd ac arferion traddodiadol yng Nghymru = Traditional dance and customs in Wales
- Tair o Fôn : Dawns y Castell, Dawns y Rhuban, Dawns y Traeth
- Rhiwfelen
- Ffair Castell-nedd = Neath Fair
