= Lois Blake =

British dance scholar

- Born: Lois Agnes Fownes Turner; 21 May 1890; Streatham, London, U.K.
- Died: 19 November 1974 (age 84); Marshfield, U.K.
- Occupations: Folklorist, dance scholar

Lois Blake (21 May 1890 – 19 November 1974), born Lois Agnes Fownes Turner, was a British folklorist and "the driving force behind the revival of folk dancing in Wales." She was the founding president of the Welsh Folk Dance Society in 1949.

== Early life ==
Blake was born in Streatham, London, the daughter of Henry Fownes Turner and Amy Dickes Turner. Her mother died in 1893, and she was raised in the household of an aunt and uncle. Blake served as a nurse, driver, and cook during World War I, in Serbia, Romania, and Russia. She was a member of the English Folk Dance and Song Society before moving to Llangwm, Denbighshire in 1930. It was in Wales that Blake began to publish a series of manuals for dances she had collected after seeing the relatively small number of dances being performed in Wales at that time.

== Career in Wales ==
Blake collaborated with W.S. Gwynn Williams to publish a series of dance manuals she had collected of the Welsh tradition. Blake published Welsh Folk Dance in 1948, before becoming a founding member and first president of the Welsh Folk Dance Society the following year. She was also a dance judge at the National Eisteddfod, lectured to local groups on her work, and helped the Urdd Gobaith Cymru youth organization on teaching Welsh dances to young people. She was admitted into the Gorsedd Cymru in 1960. Her work in Wales has been described as "almost singlehandedly rescued the remaining fragments of a once common Welsh tradition".

== Publications ==
- Welsh Morris and other Country Dances (1938, with W. S. Gwynn Williams)
- Welsh Folk Dance (1948)
- Dances of England and Wales (1950, with Maud Karpeles)
- The Llangadfan Dances (1954, with W. S. Gwynn Williams)
- "The Three Merry Dances of Wales" (1958)
- Welsh Folk Dancing and Costume (1965)
- "The Nantgarw Dances" (1966)
- Traditional Dance and Customs in Wales (1972)
- "The General Characteristics of Welsh Folk Dance" (1974)

== Personal life and legacy ==
Memorial plaque at Llangwm unveiled by her daughter Felicity, on the occasion of the 50th anniversary of the Welsh Folk Dance Society.

Turner married marine engineer Leonard James Blake in 1917. They lived mainly in Llangwm, Wales, and had two children, Felicity (born 1920) and James (born 1918). Her son died in 1945, and her husband died in 1959. She moved to Bristol in widowhood, to live with her daughter, and died in 1974, at the age of 84, at Marshfield. There is a Lois Blake Memorial Trophy presented at the National Eisteddfod, for performing one of the Nantgarw dances Blake documented.
