= Ceinwen Thomas =

Welsh linguist, teacher and academic

Ceinwen Hannah Thomas (1911–2008) was a Welsh academic and linguist. Together with her mother Catherine Margretta Thomas and Doris Freeman, she recorded and transcribed the Nantgarw dance tradition. Thomas was also an important linguist in the study of the Gwenhwyseg dialect of South East Wales, especially the traditions, folk-culture and linguistics of her home village of Nantgarw.

== Early life ==
Thomas was born in the village of Nantgarw and attended Nantgarw infant school, where she is said to have complained about the lack of local history being taught.

Her paternal great-grandfather was Ifan Tomos, a famous Welsh folk-dancer who stopped all dancing when he converted to a strict chapel lifestyle in 1859. In her adult life, Ceinwen would relate the lgend of how Ifan would feel an intense internal struggle when hearing harp music from the local tavern, and would have to quickly run past the Cross Keys Inn to avoid the "intolerable" urge to go join the dancing. Thomas would also recall that her maternal family loved to discuss the slawar dydd (days of long ago).

Thomas would remain resident in Nantgarw during her secondary education at Caerphilly and her undergraduate and Masters degrees at Cardiff. Only leaving in 1937 to obtain her doctorate from the University of Ireland.

== Work in education ==
Thomas returned to Wales in 1940 and took teaching positions, first at Ebbw Vale and then Brynmawr. Having joined Plaid Cymru as a student in Cardiff, Thomas remained active in the party throughout the 1940s and 50s and fought to promote more Wales-focused history in Welsh schools and for the use of the Welsh language in education.

Thomas returned to Cardiff and academia in the 1960s, being appointed director of the newly-established Language Research Unit in the Welsh Department at Cardiff University. During her time at the Research Unit the number of speakers of the dialect of south-east Wales, Gwenhwyseg was diminishing significantly. As such, Thomas gave the study of this dialect special attention, and the period of her directorship saw the creation of a corpus of work which would make a notable contribution to the study of the Welsh language.

== Nantgarw ==
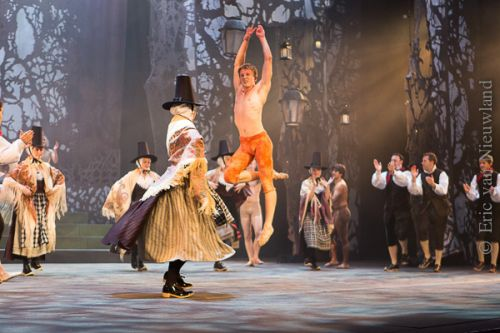
Dawnswyr Nantgarw (Nantgarw Dancers) performing with Ballet Cymru at the Millennium Centre, Cardiff.

Thomas' own academic work focused on recording the Welsh-language and folk-culture of Nantgarw. Her work transcribing the Nantgarw Dances. Although such public dances had ceased in Nantgarw by the year of her birth, she often discussed the traditions with her mother, Catherine Margretta Thomas during her school years.

As part of her academic life, Ceinwen Thomas met Walter Dowding of the Welsh Folk Dance Society, Dowding put Thomas in touch with Doris Freeman and together, the three worked to notate the dance steps from the traditional dances. These notes were then passed on to the Welsh Folk Dance Society by Ceinwen Thomas and today, The Nantgarw dances are considered a crucial part of the folk dance scene in Wales.

== Later work ==
In 1993, the culmination of her life long study of the phonetics and grammar of Welsh saw the University of Wales Press publish a two volume description of the Welsh dialect as spoken at Nantgarw. This is one of the most comprehensive works on the dialect.
