= Ballet Cymru =

Welsh ballet company

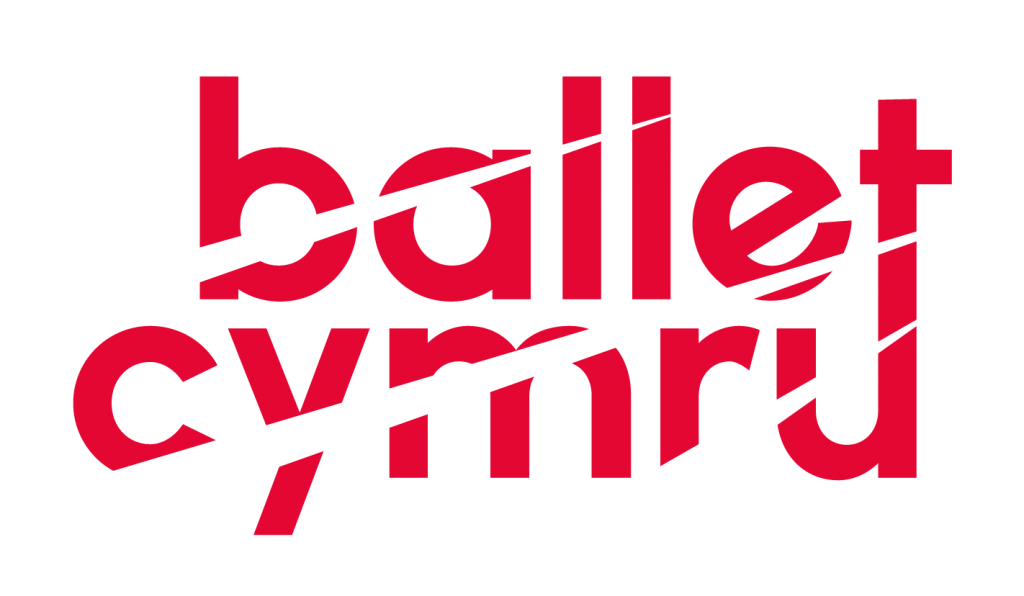

General information
- Name: Ballet Cymru
- Previous names: Welsh Ballet; Independent Ballet Wales; Ballet Annibynnol Cymru; Gwent Ballet Theatre; Cwmni Ballet Gwent
- Year founded: 1986
- Founders: Darius James, Yvonne Greenleaf
- Website: www.ballet.cymru

Ballet Cymru is a touring classical ballet company based in Newport, South Wales, formed in 1986 by choreographer Darius James and Patron Yvonne Greenleaf. Currently formed of 10 professional dancers, and up to 20 pre-professional dancers the company tours to around 30 venues each year throughout the UK. The Independent described them as "a brightly gifted, energetic young ensemble that tours England, Wales and Ireland, taking dance to smaller venues that might otherwise be starved of ballet."

== History ==
Ballet Cymru, formerly Welsh ballet, and Independent Ballet Wales and, prior to that, Gwent Ballet Theatre, is a touring classical ballet company based in Newport, South Wales, formed in 1986 by Artistic Director Darius James and Patron Yvonne Greenleaf. Following the success of Ballet Cymru's educational work Amy Doughty become the Assistant Artist Director alongside Darius James.

The company was composed of 12 professional dancers, and up to 25 pre-professional dancers, the company toured to up to 70 venues per year, performing to audiences in excess of 12,000 and has undertaken education work for around 2,300 young people and adults across the UK. The Independent described them as "a brightly gifted, energetic young ensemble that tours England, Wales and Ireland, taking dance to smaller venues that might otherwise be starved of ballet."

Ballet Cymru has been funded by the Arts Council of Wales since 2011. Over its history, the company has been known to collaborate with other companies and offer training and high-quality accessible work.

Ballet Cymru has received awards such as Best Dance Production by the Theatre Critics of Wales Awards in 2014, 2017, and 2018. The compnay also received the Critics’ Circle UK National Dance Awards Audience Award three times.

== Ballet Cymru 2 ==
The company hosts a Pre-Professional Programme called Ballet Cymru 2. The full-time, intensive course provides opportunities to train and perform alongside the company, offering the chance to develop their ballet and contemporary dance skill, choreographic skills with performance opportunities, networking opportunities, as well as workshops in light/costume design, marketing and writing grant applications to create comprehensive industry professionals.

== Engagement work ==
The company has provided educational programs across Wales. Such programs include the Duets National Dance Training Programme, enabling young people to access high quality ballet tuition across the country regardless of economic, social or geographical circumstances. The programme is specifically designed to identify talent, provide progression pathways and improve aspiration for young people who would not usually have the opportunity to access and engage with dance, particularly those living in deprived areas of Wales. This programme partnerships with 6 theatres, 9 schools and 5 dance organisations.

Additionally, the company run three Associate Programmes, Junior Associates, Mid Associates and Senior Associates designed to complement students’ existing dance training and aims to give young, talented ballet dancers the opportunity, understanding and insight into what life as a professional dancer may entail, through a closer and more regular working relationship with Ballet Cymru. The Associate Programme offers an Intensive included in the programme, (excluding the Junior Associate level) which is a week-long summer course held at Ballet Cymru’s studios in Newport, concluding in a performance to showcase the Associates’ progress over the academic year and the choreography developed during the course of the intensive week.

Further to this the company host a weekly inclusive ballet class called Ballet Cymru 3, for young people aged 8 and upwards. These sessions are open and welcoming to all regardless of ability or disability. The sessions focuses on creativity and individuality, providing a supportive space for freedom and expression. Sessions often include warmups, technique practice, creative tasks, choreography and composition, observation, improvisation, and of course a game or two.

== Repertoire ==
- Giselle (2006), (2020), (2021), (2025)
- The Canterbury Tales (2006)
- Coppélia (2007)
- The Bride of Flowers (2007)
- Under Milk Wood (2008)
- Romeo and Juliet (2008)
- A Midsummer Night's Dream (2009), (2013), (2017), (2018)
- How Green Was My Valley? (2009)
- Lady of Llyn y Fan Fach (The Lady of the Lake) (2010)
- Beauty and the Beast (2011)
- The Tempest (2012)
- Roald Dahl's Little Red Riding Hood and The Three Little Pigs (2012), (2016), (2023)
- TIR (2012), (2015), (2023)
- Romeo A Juliet (2013), (2016), (2019), (2024)
- Stuck in the Mud (2013)
- Week of Pines and The Same Flame (2014)
- Celtic Concerto (2015), (2019)
- Cinderella (2015), (2018)
- Shadow Aspect (2017)
- The Light Princess (2017)
- Dylan Thomas - A Children's Christmas, Poems and Tiger Eggs (2018)
- Wired to the Moon and Divided We Stand (2019)
- DREAM (2022)
- Streams Of Consciousness (2023)
- Daydreams & Jellybeans (2024)
- Surge and Momentum (2024)
- NPT* (2025)
- Daughters of the sea (2025)
