= Llangwm =

Llangwm may refer to one of several places in Wales:

- Llangwm, Conwy
- Llangwm, Monmouthshire
- Llangwm, Pembrokeshire
