= Llanover House =

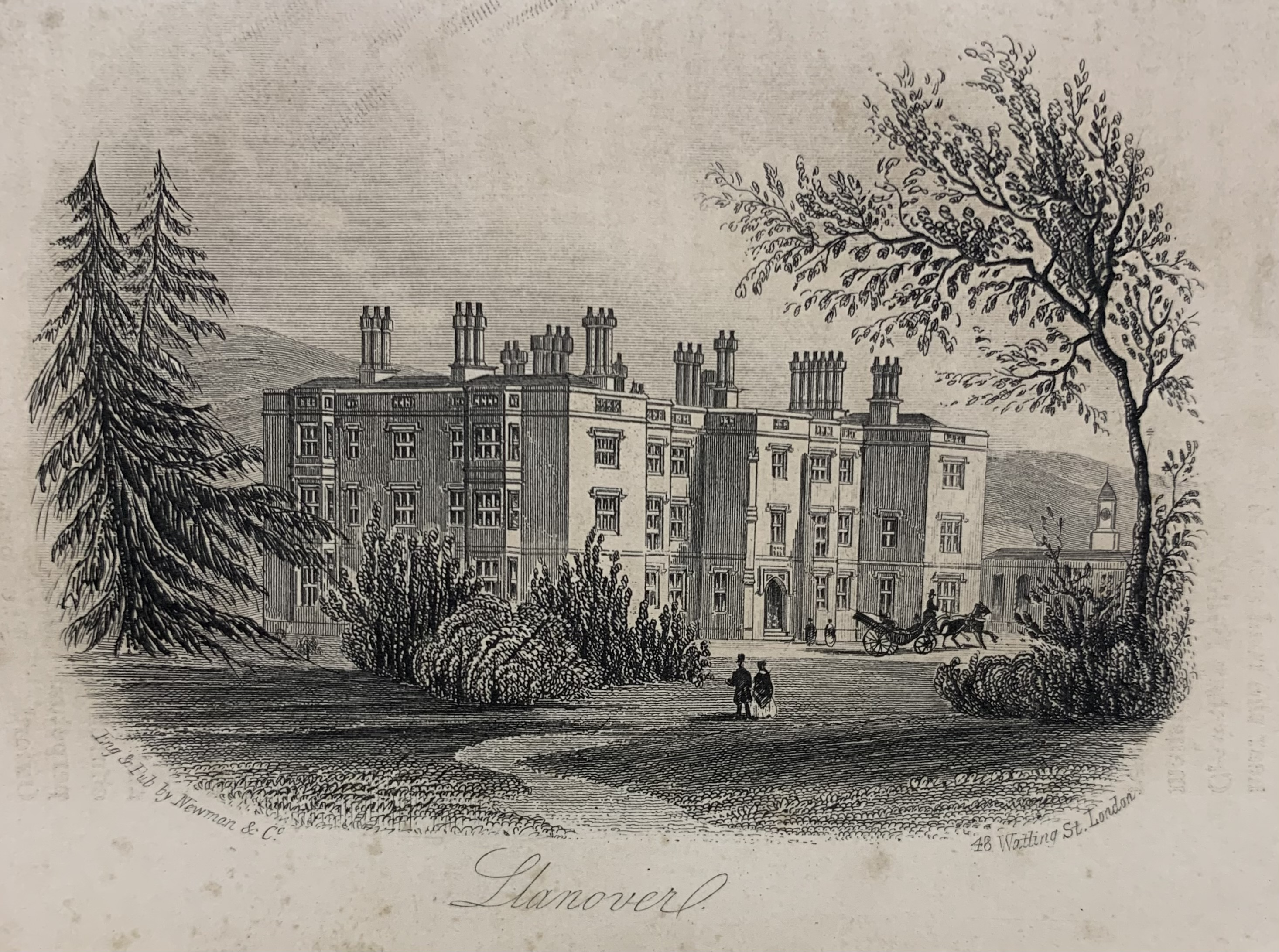

- Location within Monmouthshire
- 51.7695°N 2.9903°W
- Type: House
- Location: Llanover, Monmouthshire

History
- Built: 1837
- Demolished: 1936

Site notes
- Architect: Thomas Hopper
- Architectural style: Jacobethan

Cadw/ICOMOS Register of Parks and Gardens of Special Historic Interest in Wales
- Official name: Llanover Park
- Designated: 1 February 2022
- Reference no.: PGW(Gt)41(MON)
- Listing: Grade II*

Listed Building – Grade II
- Official name: Ty Uchaf
- Designated: 6 May 1952
- Reference no.: 1929

Listed Building – Grade II
- Official name: Old Stable Block (ruin) at Llanover Park
- Designated: 09 December 2005
- Reference no.: 87177

Listed Building – Grade II
- Official name: Hanover Chapel
- Designated: 09 January 1956
- Reference no.: 1994

Listed Building – Grade II
- Official name: Hall Monument
- Designated: 09 December 2005
- Reference no.: 87159

Llanover House, Llanover, Monmouthshire, South East Wales, was a country house dating from the mid-19th century. Commissioned by Augusta Waddington, and her husband Benjamin Hall, later Baron Llanover, the house was designed by Thomas Hopper and was largely complete by 1837. Lady Llanover was an early champion of Welsh culture and the house became a centre for its investigation and promotion. In the grounds, the Halls created an extensive park. On the wider Ty Uchaf estate, which Lady Llanover had inherited from her father, the Halls created a model estate village, with housing for their workers, chapels, schools, police and fire services, and temperance public houses, as Lady Llanover was also a champion of abstinence. After Lord Llanover's death in 1867, his widow continued to live at the house until her own death in 1896.

The house survived her by some 40 years and was demolished in 1936. The Llanover estate remains in the ownership of her descendants. It is designated at Grade II* on the Cadw/ICOMOS Register of Parks and Gardens of Special Historic Interest in Wales. The gardens and grounds are occasionally open to the public.

== History ==
In 1792, Benjamin Waddington (1749-1828), the third son of the Rev. Joshua Waddington (1711-1780), who was born in Walkeringham, Nottinghamshire bought Tŷ Uchaf, an 'ill-built, incomplete, & inelegant dwelling house' in Monmouthshire, where he laid out an extensive park. His daughter, Augusta was born at the house in March 1802. In 1823, Augusta married Benjamin Hall, from wealthy industrial family and who became a successful politician, and owner of the adjacent Llanover estate, which was united with Ty Uchaf on Augusta's inheriting following the death of her father. In 1828 the Halls determined to build a new house at the centre of their unified estate. Thomas Hopper was commissioned to design a large, three-storey house, in a Jacobethan style. Building was complete by 1837. (Note: Hopper was a versatile architect, capable of building in whatever style his patrons desired. Howard Colvin records his Neoclassical style at Kinmel Hall, Romanesque Revival at Penrhyn Castle, Tudor Gothic at Margam Castle, and Jacobethan at Llanover.)

The Halls devoted considerable attention to the development of Llanover as a model estate village, although John Newman, in his Gwent/Monmouthshire volume of the Pevsner Buildings of Wales, notes that much of the current building estate dated from the time of their grandson, Ivor Herbert, 1st Baron Treowen. In addition to the construction of cottages for the estate workers, schools for their children, and chapels for them all to worship in, Lady Llanover established a number of temperance inns, as a firm advocate of abstinence.

Lady Llanover's first passion, however, was the promotion of Welsh culture and language. A Welsh speaker herself, she employed Welsh-speaking servants, had instruction in her estate schools undertaken in Welsh, and required that the services at St Bartholomew's Church were conducted in Welsh. At a national level, Lady Llanover supported the Cymreigyddion Society, funded Daniel Silvan Evans in the production of his Welsh dictionary, purchased the Llanover Manuscripts collection from the son of Iolo Morganwg, supported the Eisteddfod movement, adopting her own bardic name, Gwenynen Gwent (The Bee of Gwent), and encouraged the study and use of the Welsh harp and Welsh costume. (Note: Although the authenticity of some of Lady Llanover's cultural traditions has subsequently been questioned, her efforts in the middle of the 19th century have seen Llanover described as a "Welsh cultural utopia".)

Lord Llanover died in 1867 and was buried at St Bartholomew's. Lady Llanover outlived him by 30 years, although becoming increasingly withdrawn from society. She died in 1898 and was buried in the family tomb, following a service conducted in Welsh.

Llanover House was demolished in 1936. The Llanover Estate remains a privately owned estate in possession of the Halls' descendants. The gardens are occasionally opened to the public.

== Architecture and description ==
LLanover House was built in a Jacobethan style, with three main storeys and grouped sets of chimney stacks. After demolition in 1936, the stables fell into disuse but still stand in a ruinous state, and are listed at Grade II. Ty Uchaf remains and is also a Grade II listed building. The gardens and park surrounding the house are listed Grade II* on the Cadw/ICOMOS Register of Parks and Gardens of Special Historic Interest in Wales.

== Gallery ==
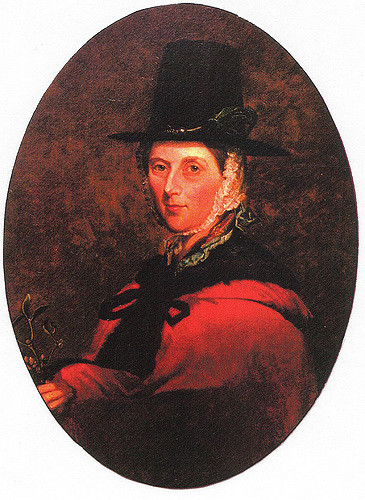
Lady Llanover, the "Bee of Gwent"

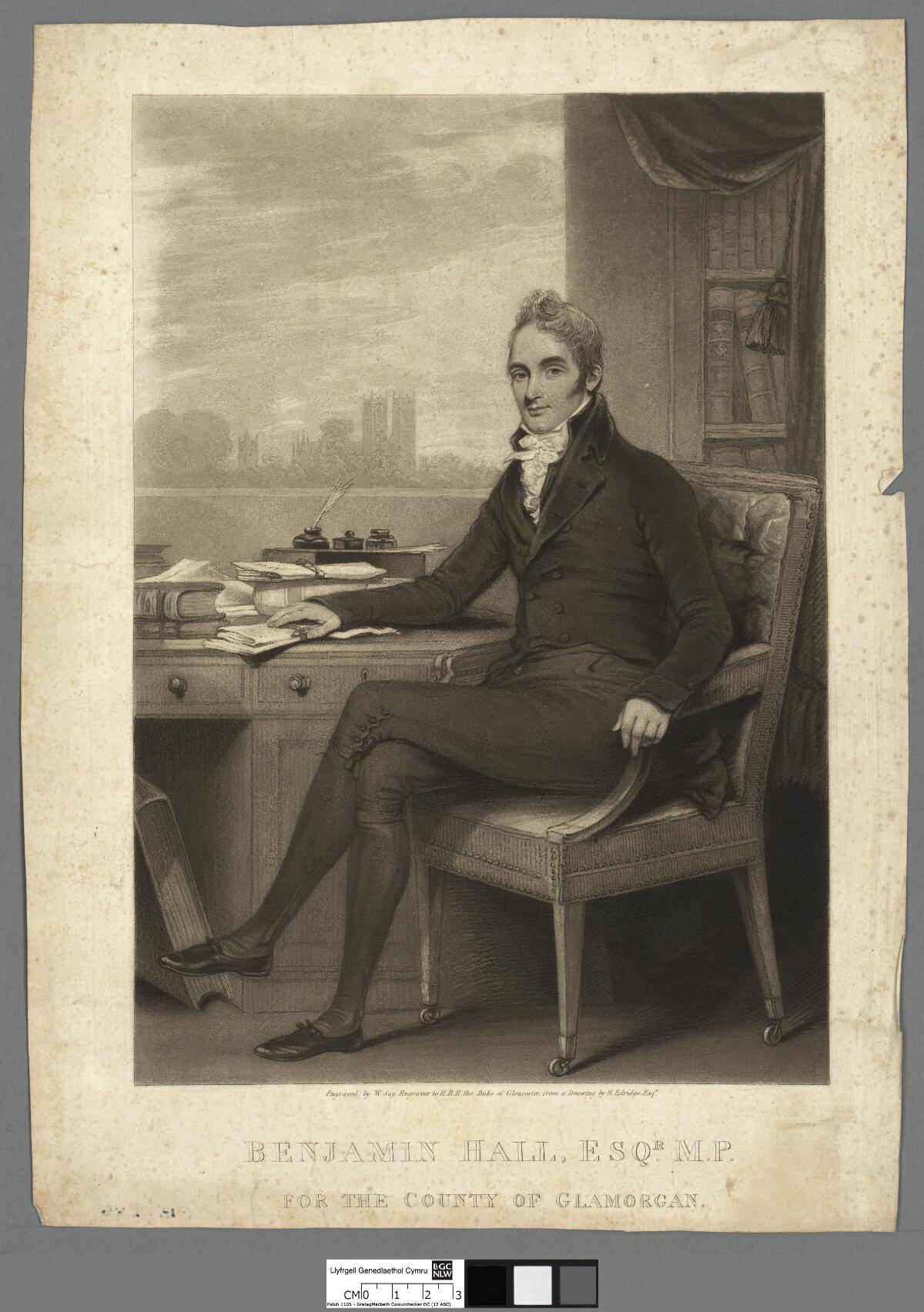
Lord Llanover

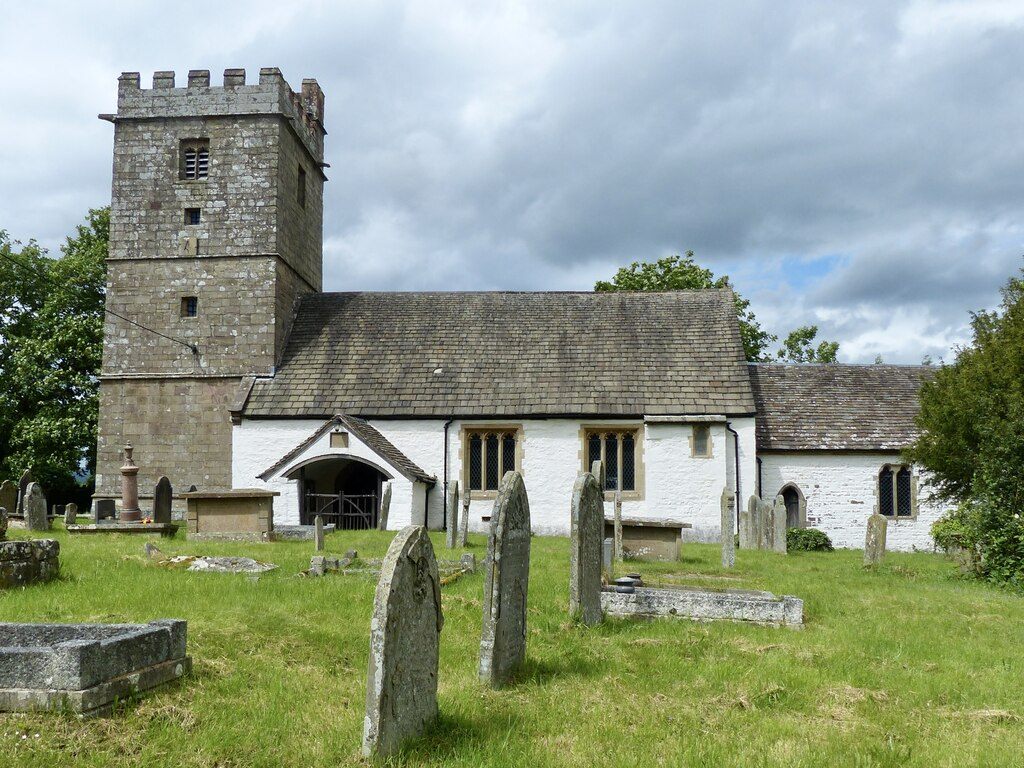
St Bartholomew's, Llanover, burial place of Lord and Lady Llanover

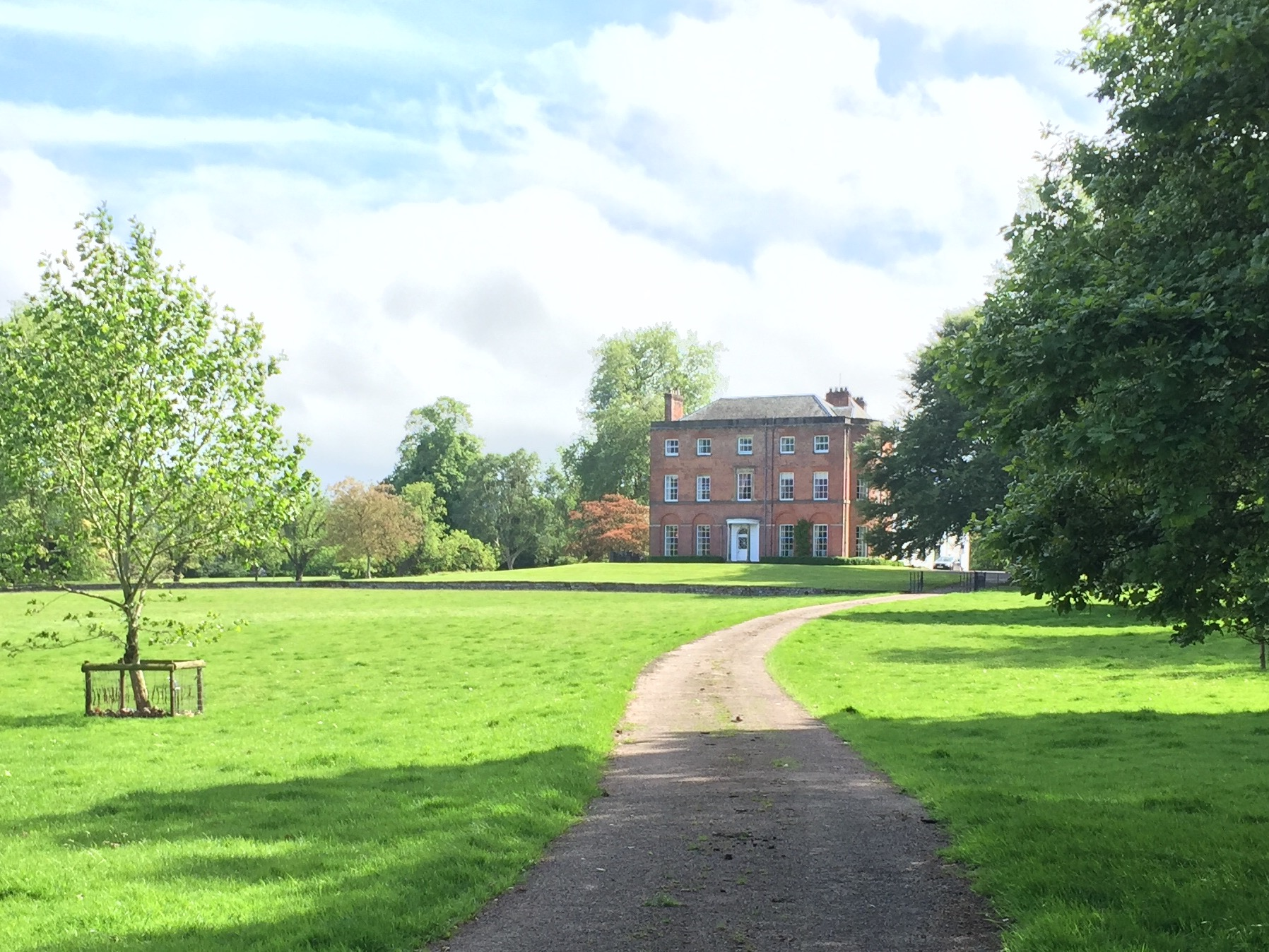
Ty Uchaf, Augusta Hall's ancestral home

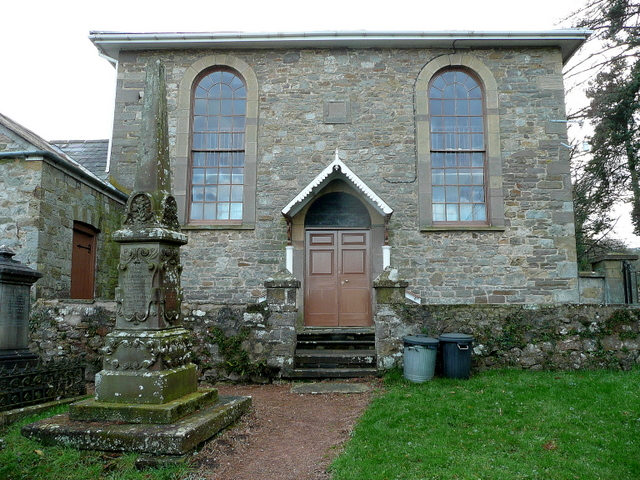
The Hanover Chapel

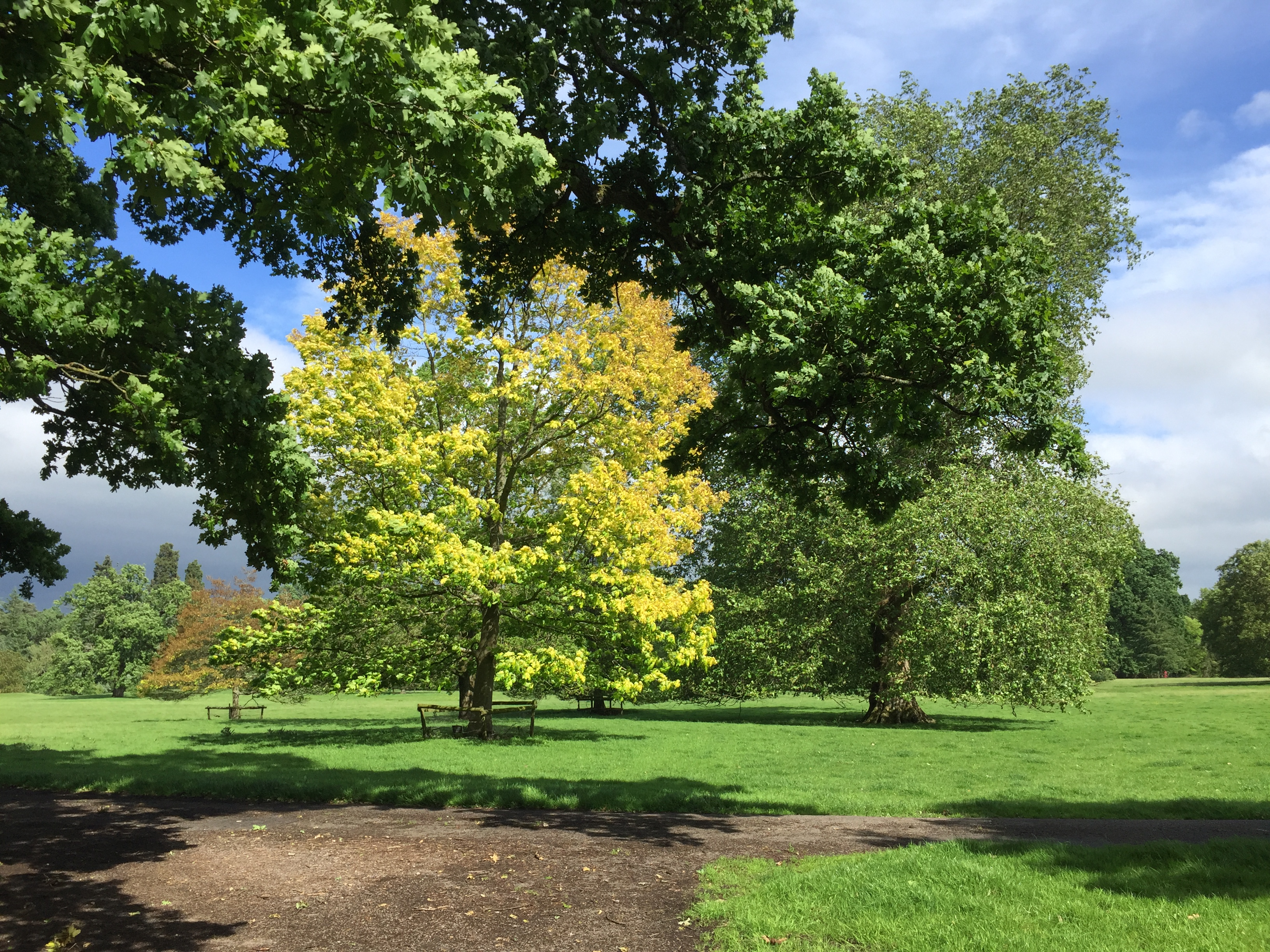
Llanover Park

== Sources ==
- Colvin, Howard (1978). A Biographical Dictionary of British Architects 1600-1840. London, UK: John Murray. ISBN 978-0-719-53328-0.
- Curl, James Stevens (2016). Oxford Dictionary of Architecture. Oxford: Oxford University Press. ISBN 978-0-199-67499-2.
- Gurden-Williams, Celyn (2008). Lady Llanover and the creation of a Welsh cultural utopia. Cardiff: Cardiff University. OCLC 1118129383.
- Newman, John (2000). Gwent/Monmouthshire. The Buildings of Wales. Penguin. ISBN 0-14-071053-1.
