= Llanover Dances =

Dance tradition in Wales

The Llanover Dances (Welsh: Dawnsfeydd Llanofer) are a collection of traditional Welsh dances originating from Llanover in Monmouthshire, Wales.

== Origins ==
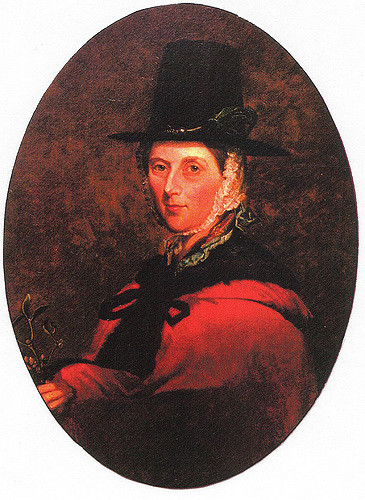
Augusta Hall, better known as Lady Llanover was a critical figure in the history of Welsh Dance.

The Llanover dances can be traced back to the actions of Augusta Hall, known as Lady Llanover. Lady Llanover was renowned for her patronage of Welsh culture at her estate, which was a centre for harpists, bards, Plygain, Welsh folk songs and Welsh dancing.

== Description ==
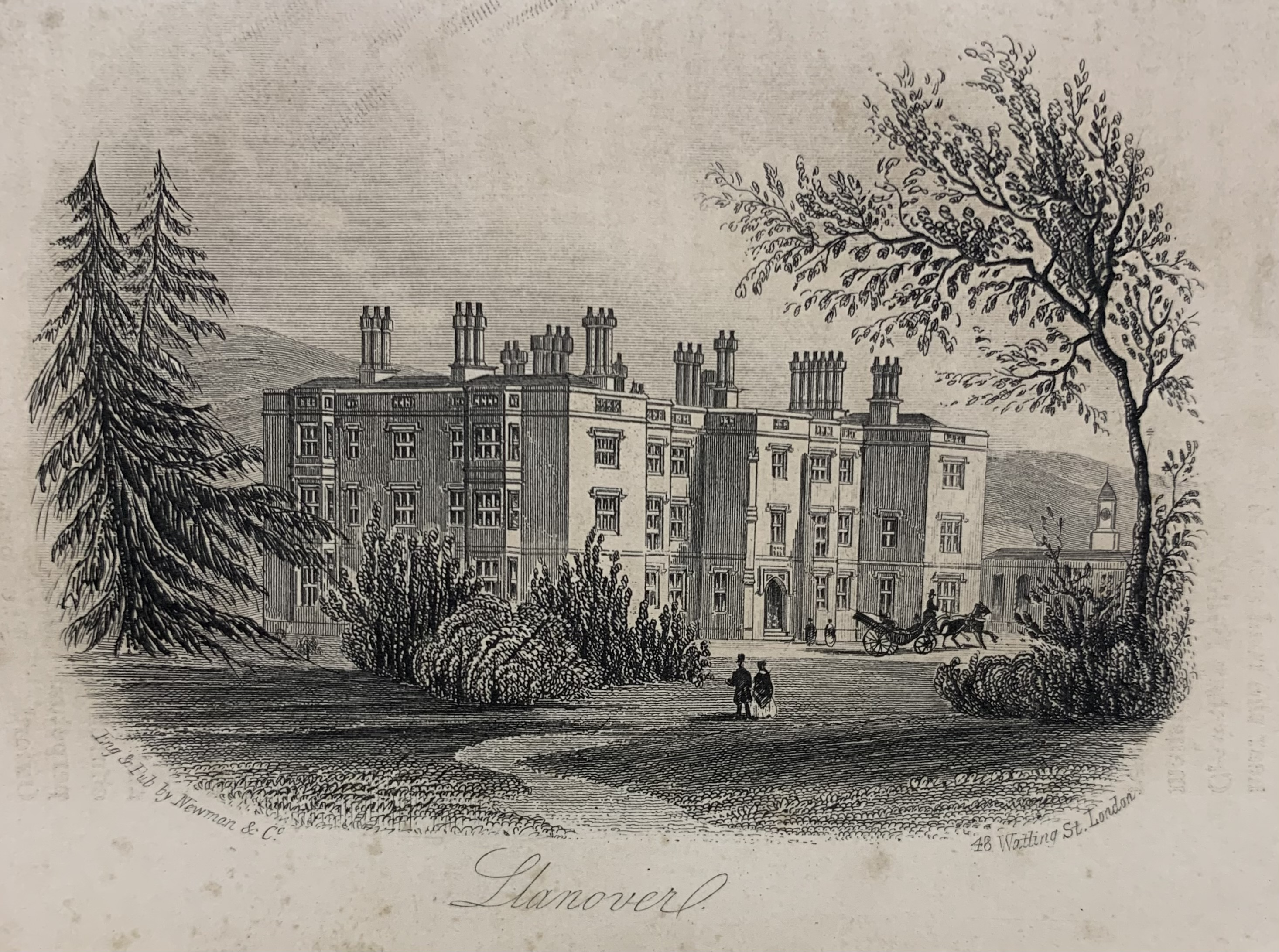
Llanover House in Monmouthshire was the location for many of the dances performances.

While a number of variations on the Llanover dances have been published, they all focus on two separate longways dances known as the Llanofer Reel and the Rhif Wyth (English:The Figure Eight). The Llanofer Reel is a fourteen figure dance in a long column of threes (usually a man and two women), who advance to whichever end of the hall the House's family and favoured guests are sat. The set up suggests that the reel was originally danced in the long, narrow Banqueting Hall at Llanover House, with the family sat directly under the musician’s gallery (or Welsh harpist in the case of Llanover House) with the name for this figure, "Tua’r Delyn" (Towards the harp) seeming to confirm this.

== Revival ==
The dances had a notable revival in the twentieth century. Mrs Gruffydd Richards revived it as a dance for the villagers and local school in 1918. She had remembered dancing the reel at Llanover House in her youth when her father, Thomas Gruffydd had composed the music for it. The notes and music were published by the Urdd in 1934, and again the following year in Hugh Mellor's book Welsh Folk Dance. Mellor's work was based on information he had obtained from Mrs Gruffydd Richards in 1926. The 1920s also saw the rediscovery of a number of Llangadfan dances among the papers of Edward Jones (Bardd y Brenin), and a number of these dances were revived and performed by the English Folk Dance Society in London in 1931.
