= W. S. Gwynn Williams =

Welsh composer (1896–1978)

William Sidney Gwynn Williams (April 4, 1896 – 13 November 1978) was a musician and composer, also lecturer, author, editor and broadcaster on the history of British and in particular Welsh music. He was prominent in the foundation of the International Eisteddfod at Llangollen, Wales in 1947 and become its first musical director.

W. S. Gwynn Williams was born at Plas Hafod, Llangollen, the son of the musician W. Pencerdd Williams. He started playing the piano and violin when he was very young and began composing in his teens. When he was 17 he became an Associate of the Tonic Sol-Fa College of Music in London. From 1922 to 1929 he edited the periodical Y Cerddor Newydd (The New Musician); from 1923 he was Director of Music for the Gorsedd of Bards of the National Eisteddfod; from 1933 to 1957 he was secretary of the Welsh Folk Song Society and become the Society's chairman in 1957. He was editor of the Society's Journal for thirty years from 1946. In 1937 he founded the Gwynn Publishing Company with the aim to increase the repertoire of traditionally inspired vocal and choral music.

He was married to Elizabeth Eleanor, and he died in 1978.

Among the many collections of folk-songs and music published by Gwynn Williams are: Old Welsh Folk-songs (1927); Caneuon Traddodiadol y Cymry (Vol 1: 1961, Vol 2: 1963); Welsh National Music and Dance (four editions: 1932 to 1971) and Harp Tunes of Wales (1962). His compositions include: Tosturi Duw (God's Mercy) (1943), My Little Welsh Home, Breuddwyd Glyndwr (Glendower's Dream) (1950), Dawns y Medelwyr (Harvester's Dance) (1940) and Welsh Playbook (1925).
