= Barddas =

- Author: Iolo Morganwg (edited by John Williams)
- Language: English
- Subject: Welsh Bardic and Druidic beliefs
- Publisher: D. J. Roderic, London, Longman & Co., Welsh Manuscripts Society
- Publication date: 1862 (Volume 1), 1874 (Volume 2)
- Publication place: United Kingdom
- Media type: print (hardback)
- Pages: 425pp (first edition)
- ISBN: 978-1-605-06171-9

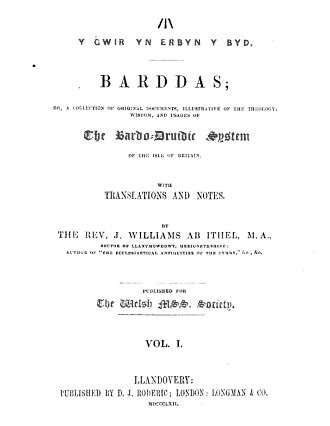
Barddas - Title page

Barddas is a book of material compiled and written by the Welsh writer Iolo Morganwg. Dressed as an authentic compilation of ancient Welsh bardic and druidic theology and lore. It was posthumously published by John Williams for the Welsh Manuscripts Society in two volumes, in 1862 and 1874.

== Publication ==
After Iolo Morganwg's death in 1826, his son Taliesin Williams set about collecting and publishing his unpublished manuscripts. This resulted in three volumes, including The Iolo Papers in 1848, published a year after Taliesin Williams' unexpected death. Subsequently, Iolo's papers were purchased by Benjamin and Augusta Hall, who made them accessible to other scholars. John Williams, alias "Ab Ithel", was among the first to take up the offer; he edited the two volumes now known as Barddas for the Welsh Manuscripts Society, which appeared in 1862 and 1874.

== Contents ==
Williams claimed the Barddas material was based on authentic ancient manuscripts originally compiled by the 16th-century antiquarian Llywelyn Siôn.

Volume I divides into three sections. The first, "Symbols", chiefly discusses "coelbren", a supposed Bardic alphabet devised by Iolo. The second, "Theology", is the most significant. It discusses Iolo's elaborate philosophy and cosmology, which he claimed was the actual belief system of the ancient bards. This section includes a "catechism" in the form of a question-and-answer session on the cycle of re-incarnation. It discusses the "circles of being" from Annwn (lowest state, Hades or Fairyland) through circles of Abred (probation state), Gwynfyd (perfect liberty) and Ceugant (infinity). It also has a number of "Triads" apparently derived from authentic Welsh Triads; according to the scholar Rachel Bromwich, this suggests Iolo had access to versions of the triads long before they were widely known or collected. The third section, "Wisdom", contains esoteric lore that may date from the 16th–17th centuries, though not from ancient druidic tradition as Iolo claims. Volume II was left unfinished at Williams' death; it is largely a guidebook for bards and gorsedds.
