= Coelbren y Beirdd =

Constructed script

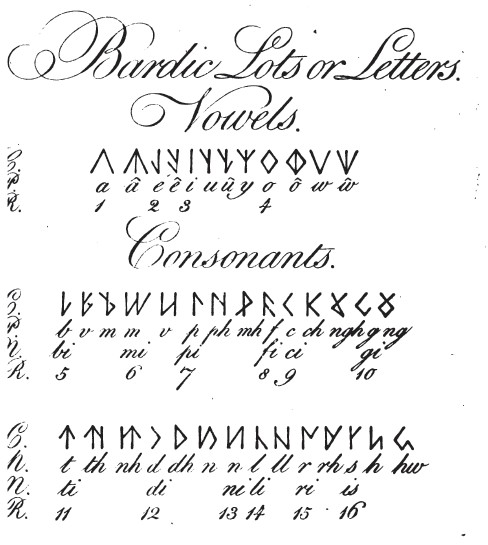
Table of letters in Celtic Researches (1804) by Edward Davies (1756–1831)

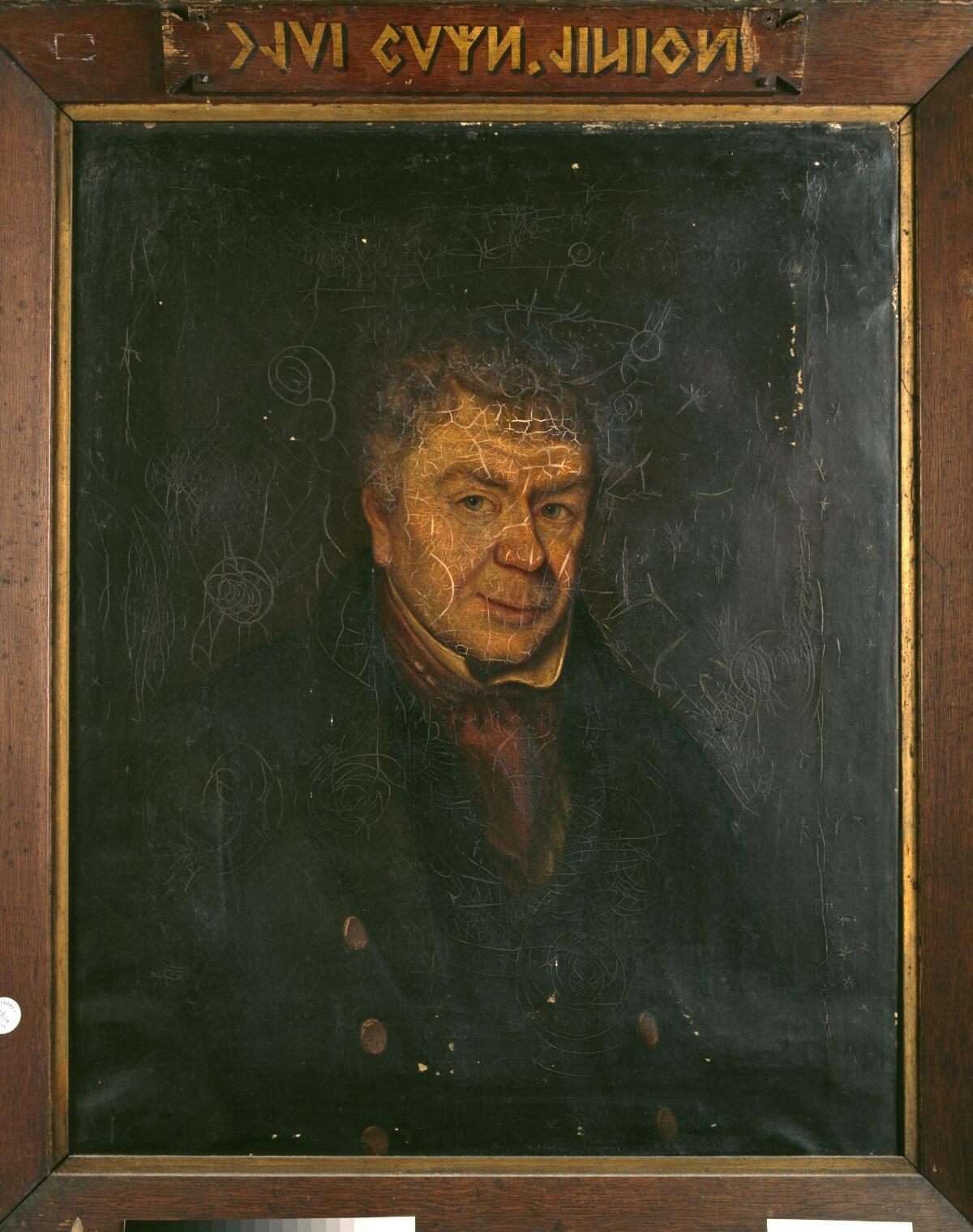
Painting of Dewi Wyn o Eifion (1784–1841) with the title written in Coelbren y Beirdd

The Coelbren y Beirdd (lit. 'Bards' lot') is a script created in the late eighteenth century by the Welsh antiquarian and literary forger Edward Williams, best known as Iolo Morganwg.

The script, an alphabet compared to that of Ancient Greek by Welsh writer Jane Williams, consisted of forty letters – twenty base letters, and a further twenty devoted to long vowels and consonant mutations. It could be carved on four-sided pieces of wood and fitted into a frame called a "peithynen". Morganwg presented wooden druidic alphabets to friends and notables, and succeeded in persuading many of its authenticity.

A Welsh Bardic and Druidic essay, written by his son Taliesin Williams and published as a pamphlet in 1840, defended the authenticity of the alphabet and won the Abergavenny Eisteddfod in 1838.

Taliesin Williams's book was written about other Coelbrennau'r Beirdd, which is the name of a Welsh language manuscript in the Iolo Manuscripts and two manuscripts in Barddas, one with the subtitle "yn dorredig a chyllell". Iolo Morganwg suggested they were originally the work of bards from Glamorgan who had their manuscripts copied into collections stored at Plas y Fan, Neath Abbey, Margam Abbey and Raglan Library, and compiled by Meurig Dafydd and Lewys Morgannwg, amongst others, in the 1700s. These were suggested to have again been transcribed by Edward Dafydd, John Bradford and Llywelyn Siôn. Morganwg suggested that he had collected some of Siôn and Bradford's manuscripts, while the majority, including all of Lewys Morgannwg's sources, were lost. Numerous scholars have concluded that the script was a hoax.

== See also ==
- Ogham
