= Jane Williams (Ysgafell) =

Welsh writer and folklorist (1806–1885)

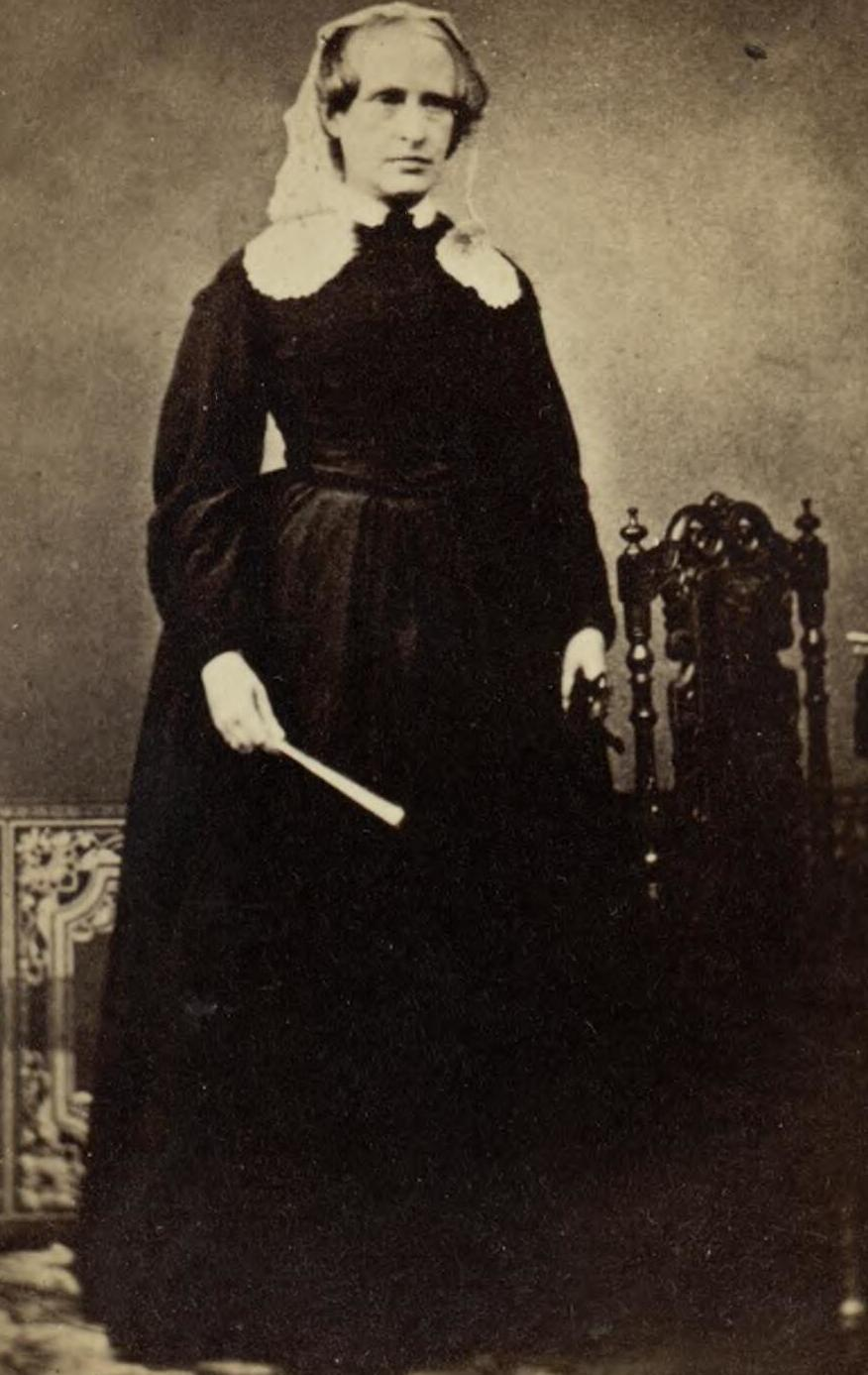
- Williams c. 1870
- Born: 1 February 1806; Chelsea, London, England
- Died: 15 March 1885 (aged 79)
- Burial place: Brompton Cemetery, London, England

Jane Williams (1 February 1806 – 15 March 1885) was a Welsh writer, often known by her bardic name of Ysgafell.

Williams was born in Chelsea, and raised at Neuadd Felen, near Talgarth, Brecknockshire. Her primary interests as a writer included Welsh history, Welsh literature, and Welsh folklore. In 1862, Williams wrote a book about Celtic fables, fairy tales, and legends. In 1869, she wrote a book about the history of Wales, using (in her words) "authentic sources".

== Biography ==
Williams was born on 1 February 1806 in Chelsea in West London, the daughter of David Williams, a naval official, and Eleanor Williams. She spent her youth in the family seat of Neuadd Felen, near Talgarth in Powys, where she developed an interest in Welsh history, literature and folklore, and associated with Augusta Hall, Lady Llanover. A volume of her poems was published privately in 1824, and she later published books on education in Wales, on Welsh folklore, and on Reverend Thomas Price.

Williams wrote the first article published in the first volume of the Cambrian Journal in 1854, which was her 1843 English translation of an article written in French by the German Dr Carl Meyer of Rinteln, on the philology of Celtic languages, which had won the Great Prize at the Cymreigyddion y Fenni Eisteddfod at Abergavenny in October 1842.

Williams returned to Chelsea in 1856, where she continued to write and publish, including an 1857 book on the nurse Elizabeth Davis. Her 1869 book on the history of Wales was highly regarded. Her history of the parish of Glasbury was published in Archaeologia Cambrensis 1870. She assisted Henry Brinley Richards with his book on the Songs of Wales, published in 1873.

Williams remained in London until her death, and she was buried at Brompton Cemetery.

In 2020 the University of Wales Press published a biography of Jane Williams by Gwyneth Tyson Roberts.

== Selected works ==
- Miscellaneous Poems (1824)
- Twenty Essays on the Practical Improvement of God's Providential Dispensations as Means to the Moral Discipline to the Christian (1838)
- Artegall; or Remarks on the Reports of the Commissioners of Inquiry into the State of Education in Wales (1848)
- The Literary Remains of the Rev. Thomas Price, Carnhuanawc … with a Memoir of his Life (1854–55)
- The Autobiography of Elizabeth Davis, a Balaclava Nurse, Daughter of Dafydd Cadwaladr (1857)
- The Literary Women of England (1861)
- Celtic Fables, Fairy Tales and Legends versified (1862, reprinting "Cambrian Tales" first published in Ainsworth's Magazine in 1849–50)
- A History of Wales: Derived from Authentic Sources. London: Longmans, Green & Co. 1869. Republished 2010 by Cambridge University Press
