= Griffith John Williams =

Historian of Welsh literature (1892–1963)

- Born: 19 July 1892; Cellan, Ceredigion, Wales
- Died: 10 January 1963 (aged 70)
- Occupation: Historian of Welsh literature

Griffith John Williams (also known as G. J. Williams; 19 July 1892 – 10 January 1963) was a historian of Welsh literature, particularly the literature of Glamorgan and Iolo Morganwg. He was the first scholar to prove that some medieval works found in Iolo's books are literary forgeries, helping to establish solid foundations for literary scholarship in Wales.

== Early life ==
Williams was born in Cellan, Ceredigion, the eldest son of John and Anne (née Griffiths) Williams. John Williams was a blacksmith and local postman, as well as precentor and church secretary at Capel-yr-Erw Independent Chapel.

Griffith John Williams attended the council school in Cellan and then Tregaron Intermediate School. He fell sick and missed a year of school, instead helping his father deliver post.

Williams went to his first Eisteddfod, in 1911 in Carmarthen, with his father, which he remembered enthusiastically throughout his life.

== Career ==
Williams began his university career at University of Wales College, Aberystwyth where he studied Mathematics, Latin and History between 1911 and 1914. After graduating, he worked as a teacher, first at Dolgellau County School in 1914-15 and then Porth County School in 1915-16.

In 1917, Williams studied the Llanover Manuscripts in pursuit of his M.A. degree in Middle Welsh texts. During this time, he began researching Iolo Morganwg, his main field of research for the rest of his life. After publishing articles about Iolo's work in Y Beirniad, he became a lecturer of Welsh at University College, Cardiff.

In 1921, Williams won an essay competition at the national Eisteddfod in Caernarfon, arguing that the author of sixteen cywyddau contained in Iolo's Appendix to Barddoniaeth Dafydd ab Gwilym (1789) was Iolo himself, despite Iolo claiming to have found them in old manuscripts kept in Glamorgan. In 1926, Williams published his winning essay as Iolo Morganwg a chywyddau'r Ychwanegiad.

In 1930, Williams studied William Midleton's Welsh Renaissance works. In 1933, he published Gramadegau'r Penceirddiaid about the grammar of Middle Ages poets. In 1939, he edited Gruffydd Robert's Welsh grammar (1567). He also studied the work of Edward Lhuyd, Charles Edwards, Stephen Hughes, and William Owen Pughe.

In 1946, Williams succeeded W. J. Gruffydd as Chair of Welsh at University College, Cardiff.

In 1948, he wrote Traddodiad llenyddol Morgannwg, initially intended as a preface to a biography of Iolo.

In 1950, he founded Llên Cymru, a semiannual journal about the history of Welsh literature.

In the 1950s, one of Iolo Morgannwg's descendants donated some of his documents to the National Library of Wales. Williams delayed the publication of his biography to include material from this collection. He published Iolo Morganwg: y gyfrol gyntaf in 1956.

In 1957, Williams retired from the Chair of Welsh at University College, Cardiff.

In 1959, Williams delivered the O'Donnell lecture at the University of Wales on Edward Lhuyd.

In 1960, he was elected the first president of Yr Academi Gymreig (Welsh Academy).

Williams was also a member of the editorial board of the University of Wales' Dictionary.

During 1962, Williams was preparing to write a second volume of his biography of Iolo Morgannwg. He was also planning to deliver the BBC Home Service for Wales' annual lecture on Iolo, but he died before completing either.

== Personal life ==
Williams met Elisabeth Elen Roberts while they were both studying at Aberystwyth. She came from Blaenau Ffestiniog and, after graduating, she taught Welsh in Treforest, Pontypridd and at Ebbw Vale, Monmouthshire.

Williams wrote poetry, competing in Eisteddfodau, winning the Corwen Eisteddfod in 1919 and the Barry Eisteddfod in 1920. Many poems found among his papers from this time were written in Elisabeth's handwriting. After his appointment as lecturer in 1921, Williams stopped writing poems to focus on his research.

Williams married Elisabeth in 1922. Between 1922 and 1933, they lived at 9 Bedwas Place, Penarth. In 1933, the couple moved to Bryn Taf in Gwaelod-y-Gart.

Elisabeth supported Williams throughout his career, sharing his passion for the Welsh language and Wales. She designed a cupboard to store Williams' notes, so information could be easily retrieved, and she helped prepare his work for publication.

Williams died on 10 January 1963.

Williams collected old Welsh books, possessing rare books from the 16th, 17th and 18th centuries. His library, papers and desk were donated to the National Library.

On 31 January 1979, Elisabeth died in St David's Hospital, Cardiff after a very short illness. Her final words were "Cymru am Byth" (English: "Wales Forever").

Griffiths John and Elisabeth Williams had no children.

== Activism ==
On 7 January 1924, at the Williams' house in Penarth, Saunders Lewis and W. Ambrose Bebb founded a 'new Welsh movement', of which G.J. Williams acted as treasurer. At the national Eisteddfod in 1925, this group joined with a similar one in north Wales, establishing the Welsh National Party (now known as Plaid Cymru).

During the Great Slump, Elisabeth organised a working co-operative for women in Gwaelog-y-Gart, inviting them to the Williams' home, Bryn Taf, to teach them to quilt in the traditional Welsh style. They sold quilted objects in Cardiff and London. The co-operative folded when World War I started. A quilted cushion cover made by Elisabeth Williams from her personal collection was donated to the Cardiff Story Museum when it opened in 2011.

Elisabeth was a staunch defender of the Welsh language. She insisted that the minutes of the local Pentyrch Parish Council were taken in Welsh. She was also known to take over school classes uninvited to teach Welsh to the children, as well as playing harp to teach them Welsh folk dancing.

The Williams' home, Bryn Taf, was the site of initial talks about establishing a Welsh teachers' union, which led to the formation of UCAC, as well as the creation of a Welsh folk museum, which was realised as St Fagan's Museum. Between 1959 and 1961, Williams was chairman of the St Fagan's Museum Committee.

In 1958, Williams' wrote The Welsh Tradition of Gwent, a pamphlet published by Plaid Cymru, setting out Monmouthshire's claim to be Welsh.

In 1968, Elisabeth Williams donated a large amount of money to the National Union of Teachers of Wales to establish the Bryn Taf Trust, which helps disabled Welsh-speaking children.

Elisabeth Williams' will left their house, Bryn Taf, to Plaid Cymru.
