= Davod Aur Edeyrn =

Welsh writer

Davod Aur Edeyrn, "The Golden-tongued" fl. 1270, was a Welsh bard and grammarian.

== Works ==
Dosparth Edeyrn Davod Aur; or, The ancient Welsh grammar, which was compiled by royal command in the thirteenth century by Edeyrn the Golden tongued (IA dosparthedeyrnd01abergoog)

Davod Aur Edeyrn is said to have written a grammar of the Welsh language in the thirteenth century, published in 1856 by the Welsh Manuscripts Society, with an English translation and notes by the Rev. John Williams ab Ithel. The introduction states that Edeyrn "performed it by command and at the desire of these three lords paramount, namely, Llewelyn, son of Gruffydd, prince of Aberffraw, and king of all Wales; Rhys Fychan, lord of Dinefwr and Ystrad Towy; and Morgan Fychan, lord of the territory between Nedd and Afan and Cilfai, and lord paramount of Morganwg."

The same introduction, which can hardly in propriety be Edeyrn's work, speaks of Edeyrn's "acute and profound genius, reflection, various acquirements, memory, and retention." He compiled it "from the record which Einiawn the priest had formed". It includes not only "the Cymric letters and parts of speech," but "the metres of vocal song." The version published is said to have been "copied from a transcript of Mr. Lewis Richards of Darowen, Montgomeryshire, dated 1821, by the Rev. W. J. Rees of Cascob, Radnorshire, 1832," and that "Mr. Richards appears to have taken his copy from a manuscript of Iolo Morganwg."

There has been much academic debate as to the original date of the source of Davod's work, given that Iolo Morganwg's reputation as a forger has muddied the waters. There was a reference to 'Dull Edern Dafod Aur' in the elegy written by Siôn ap Hywel ap Llywelyn Fychan upon the death of fellow Welsh poet Tudur Aled c. 1526 which indicated that the grammar was widely read and recognised as a definitive source by that date, from which it is inferred that it was originally written in a preceding century.

=== Editions ===
- Dosparth Edeyrn Davod Aur; or, The ancient Welsh grammar, which was compiled by royal command in the thirteenth century by Edeyrn the golden tongued, to which is added Y Pum Llyfr Kerddwriaeth, or the rules of Welsh poetry, originally compiled by Davydd Ddu Athraw, in the fourteenth, and subsequently enlarged by Simwnt Vychan, in the sixteenth century: with English translations and notes by the rev. John Williams Ab Ithel. Published for The Welsh MSS. Society. Llandovery, 1856 (archive.org)
