= Sian Owen =

Welsh author

- Born: April 8, 1965; Llanuwchllyn
- Died: October 3, 2013 (aged 48); Marian-glas, Anglesey

Sian Owen (8 April 1965 – 3 October 2013) was a translator, editor, and author from Wales. She wrote the novel Mân Esgyrn and was the first female archdruid of the Anglesey Gorsedd of Bards.

== Early life ==
Sian Owen was born in Llanuwchllyn and raised in Anglesey. She attended Bodedern High School before studying physics at Aberystwyth University.

== Career ==
Sian Owen worked freelance as a translator, author, and editor. She also produced programmes for BBC Radio Cymru and edited scientific textbooks for WJEC. She won the Féile Filíochta International Poetry Competition in 2007.

Her only novel Mân Esgyrn, set in Anglesey, came second in the Daniel Owen Memorial Prize competition at the National Eisteddfod of Wales in 2009 and made the longlist for Welsh Book of the Year in 2010. The Welsh literary magazine O'r Pedwar Gwynt called it "a contemporary classic".

In 2011, she was appointed as the first female Archdruid of the Anglesey Gorsedd of Bards.

A collection of Sian Owen's poetry was released posthumously in 2015, edited by Annes Glynn.

== Personal life ==
Sian Owen was married and had three children. She lived in Marian-glas, Anglesey. She died of cancer in October 2013.

== Bibliography ==
- Mân Esgyrn, October 2009 (Gomer Press)
- Darn o'r Haul, July 2015 (Barddas)
