= Llywelyn Fychan =

Llywelyn Fychan, meaning "Llywelyn the Lesser" or "Llywelyn the Younger", is a name that was applied to a number of minor Welsh lords and princes during the medieval period:

- The son of Llywelyn Aurdorchog (fl. 1065)
- The younger son of Maredudd ap Cynan ab Owain Gwynedd (fl. early 13th century)
- The father-in-law of Gwerful Mechain (15th century)
- The paternal grandfather of the poet Siôn ap Hywel (15th century)
