= Augusta Hall, Baroness Llanover =

Welsh noblewoman and cultural revivalist (1802–1896)

Lady Llanover
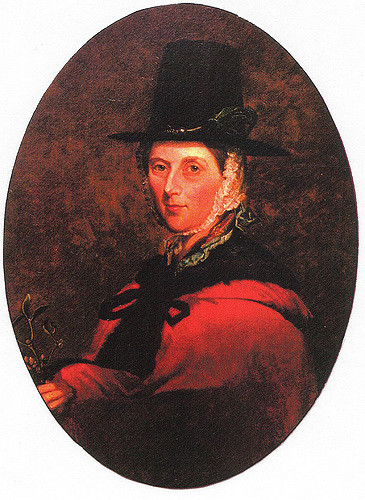
- Augusta Hall by Charles Augustus Mornewick
- Born: 21 March 1802; Abergavenny, Wales
- Died: 17 January 1896 (aged 93)
- Burial place: St Bartholomew's Church, Llanover
- Known for: Promoting Welsh culture Championing temperance
- Spouse: Benjamin Hall, 1st Baron Llanover
- Family: Arthur Jones (son-in-law); Ivor Herbert, 1st Baron Treowen (grandson); Fflorens Roch (great-granddaughter)

Lady Llanover (born Augusta Waddington and officially styled as Augusta Hall, Baroness Llanover, nickname Gwenynen Gwent Fach, 'The little Bee of Gwent') (21 March 1802 – 17 January 1896), was a Welsh heiress, who was best known as a patron of the Welsh arts. She was born in the Llanover Estate in Goetre Fawr, five miles south of Abergavenny, in the historic county of Monmouthshire in South East Wales, the youngest daughter of Benjamin Waddington and his wife, Georgina Mary Anne Port. She and her five sisters were raised and educated by their mother. In 1823 she married Benjamin Hall from Abercarn, also in Monmouthshire, and the couple rented a house near Almeley in Herefordshire. Later, upon the death of her father in 1828, she inherited the Llanover Estate, after which they moved into it, to enable Augusta to look after her mother. Benjamin Hall died in 1867 in London, after which Augusta Hall remained in the estate until she died in 1896.

== Early life ==
Augusta Hall was born on 21st March 1802 in Ty Uchaf, Llanover (Note: Ty Uchaf.), to Benjamin and Georgina Waddington. Her father was originally from Walkeringham in Nottinghamshire. He had established with his brother a business in London as American merchants and became wealthy. (Note: Hare 1882, pp. 24–25 described Waddington in detail.) Her mother was from Ilam in Staffordshire, in the West Midlands of England, whose family owned Ilam Park. (Note: Hare 1882, pp. 22–23 described in detail the background of Georgina's marriage to Waddington.) The couple had six daughters. One of them, Frances, documented that her father bought the Llanover Estate 'more from wearinefs of the long search after a dwelling, than from any temptation offered by Llanover, where an ill built, incomplete, & inelegant dwelling house, needed large additions to be built in order to become a pofsible place of abode' (Note: Original spelling.) (Fraser 1960, p. 318).

Augusta was the last of the daughters who was born to the couple. Initially her health caused concern. However, she recovered by the age of three. She was educated at home with her sisters by her mother, based upon the education she had received as a child from Mary Delany, her great-aunt, after the death of her mother. Consequently, Augusta studied Greek, Latin, Spanish, Italian, Euclid, economics, music, drawing, history, literature and geography, as well as embroidery and household management.

== Marriage ==
Forder (2012) documented that the Waddington family invited families to visit them in Llanover which 'no doubt' included 'the Halls of Abercarn', which included six sons and a daughter. On November 8th 1823 the Waddingtons were guests at the coming of age celebrations of one of their sons, Benjamin, in a room over the New Market Place in Abercarn, at which there were bonfires and fireworks, and dancing. Forder (2012) documented: 'It must have been obvious to all who knew them that there was an affectionate bond between Benjamin and Augusta'. Furthermore: 'Very soon afterwards, on the 4th December, Benjamin and Augusta were married' in LLanover church. (Note: Hare (1882) documented that the attachment which preceded the marriage had started, 'as boy and girl, years before Mr. Hall had attained his majority.' (Hare 1882, p. 226) And Fraser (1962b) documented: 'the Hall and Waddington families were on intimate terms at least as early as 1815.' (Fraser 1962b))

After a brief honeymoon in Trecastle, the couple rented a house in Almeley in Herefordshire. Then, upon the death of Hall's father in 1828, they commissioned Thomas Hopper to build Llys Llanofer, Llanover House (Note: Llanover House.), for them, which was completed in 1837. Subsequently Llys Llanofer was often used as a meeting place for Welsh authors, poets and musicians. (Note: Augusta Hall, Lady Llanover ( 'Lady Llanover') (1802-1896).)

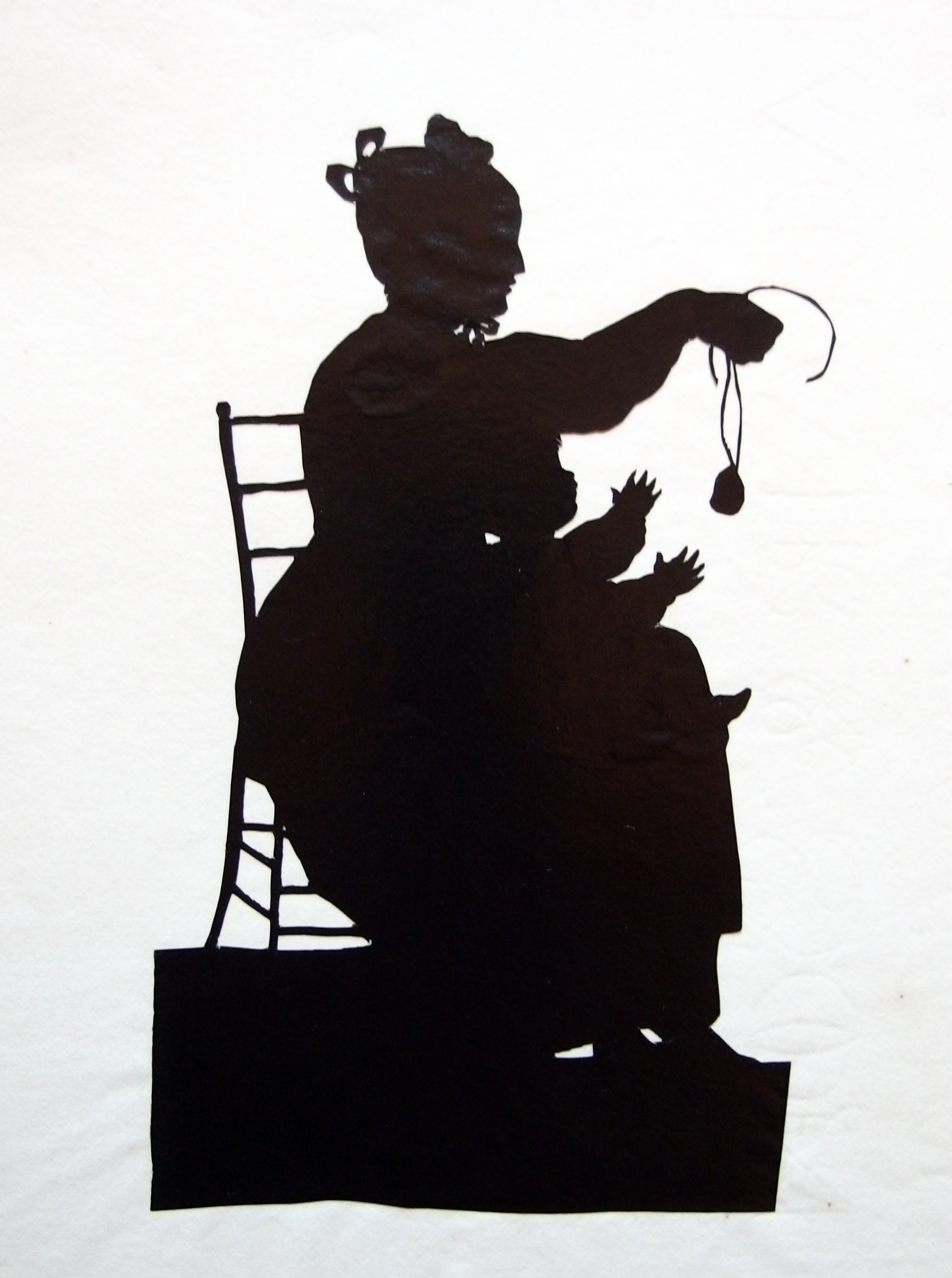
Toddler & his nurse, cut by his mother Augusta Hall, October 1831

== Welsh culture ==
Augusta Hall had always been interested in Celtic Studies. And she was greatly influenced by the local bard, Thomas Price (Carnhuanawc), whom she met at a local Eisteddfod in 1826 (Note: Thomas (1988) documented that Carnhuanawc indirectly influenced Lady Llanover early in her life through Elizabeth Brown Greenly, her mother's best friend, who had been taught by him. (Thomas 1988, p. 5)), after which they became life-long friends. In 1834 she entered a competition for an essay on the subject of the Welsh language and national costumes of Wales under the bardic name "Gwenynen Gwent", ('the Bee of Gwent') (Note: Gwent 1836. Augusta Hall's essay was simultaneously published by William Bird of Cardiff.). (Note: Gurden-Williams (2008) observed that Augusta Hall 'became known as Gwenynen Gwent Fach, the little Bee of Gwent, an inherited name from her mother' (Gurden-Williams 2008, p. 27), 'by which she became known for the rest of her life' (Thomas 1988, p. 5).) Her entry, in which she identified the advantages which derive from keeping the Welsh language and Welsh costumes, won first prize, for which she received a seal ring from Lord Bute, which was offered to the competition by the Gwyneddigesau (the ladies of Gwynedd).

Within three months of its creation, Augusta Hall and her husband became members of Cymreigyddion y Fenni, which was based in Abergavenny. Her Welsh was never considered fluent but she was an extremely enthusiastic proponent of all things Welsh. She structured her household at Llanover Hall on what she considered to be Welsh traditions and gave all her staff Welsh titles and Welsh costume to wear.

Agusta Hall was committed to the preservation of the heritage of Wales, and campaigned for Welsh parishioners to be able to hear church services conducted in the Welsh language. (Note: The efforts of Augusta Hall to revive the Welsh language didn't meet with universal approval. Edward Copleston, the Bishop of Llandaff, complained to his colleague William Bruce Knight, the Dean of Llandaff, in a letter: 'I wonder they are not tired of this barren nonsense.' (Cited by Davies 1965, p. 118).)

=== Welsh Costume ===
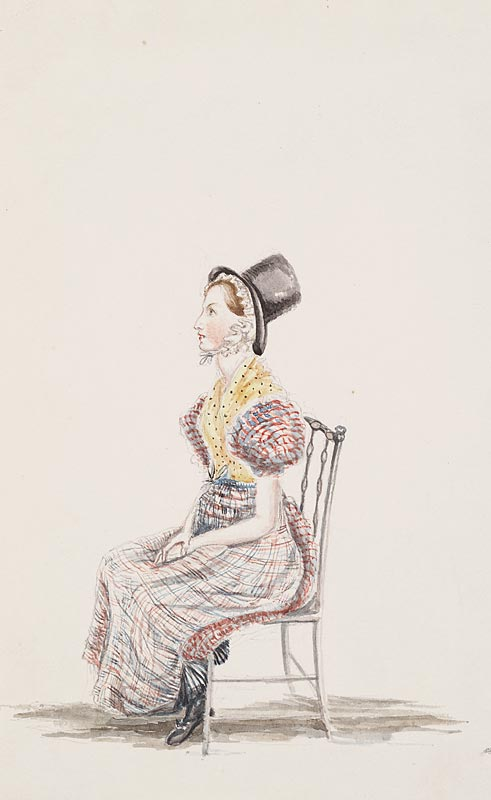
One of Augusta Hall's Welsh costume watercolours, 1830

Augusta Hall probably commissioned a series of watercolours of Welsh costumes which illustrate costumes worn by women in south Wales and Cardiganshire, 13 of which were reproduced as hand-coloured prints soon after 1834. These were little more than fashion prints for herself and friends to create dresses for themselves and their servants to be worn on special occasions, especially fancy dress balls. Although she was keen to see the women of Wales dressed in home-spun Welsh wool rather than the light cheap cottons which were becoming popular by the 1830s, there is very little evidence to show that she had any influence on the wearing of Welsh costume other than by her servants, family and friends, and there is no firm evidence to suggest that she influenced what was later adopted as the national costume of Wales. (Note: Welsh National Dress Archived 13 October 2008 at the Wayback Machine from St Fagans National History Museum website.) She did encourage the production of traditional stripes and checks in woollen cloth and offered prizes for good examples of these at Eisteddfodau, but there were few entrants, with the weaver of Gwenfrwd mill, on her own estate, taking many of the prizes. (Note: Welsh Costume/Gwisg Gwmreig.)

=== Welsh music ===
Augusta Hall was interested in folk music; she encouraged the production and use of the traditional Welsh triple harp, employing a resident harpist at Llanover Hall. Thomas (1988) observed that, through the combined efforts of her and Carnhuanawc, 'the triple harp became the national instrument of the eisteddfodau during the nineteenth century'. ALso, she collaborated with Welsh musicians such as Maria Jane Williams, a noted harpist, vocalist and guitar player and Henry Brinley Richards, a noted composer best known for writing "God Bless the Prince of Wales", and herself produced a Collection of Welsh Airs.

=== Welsh literature ===
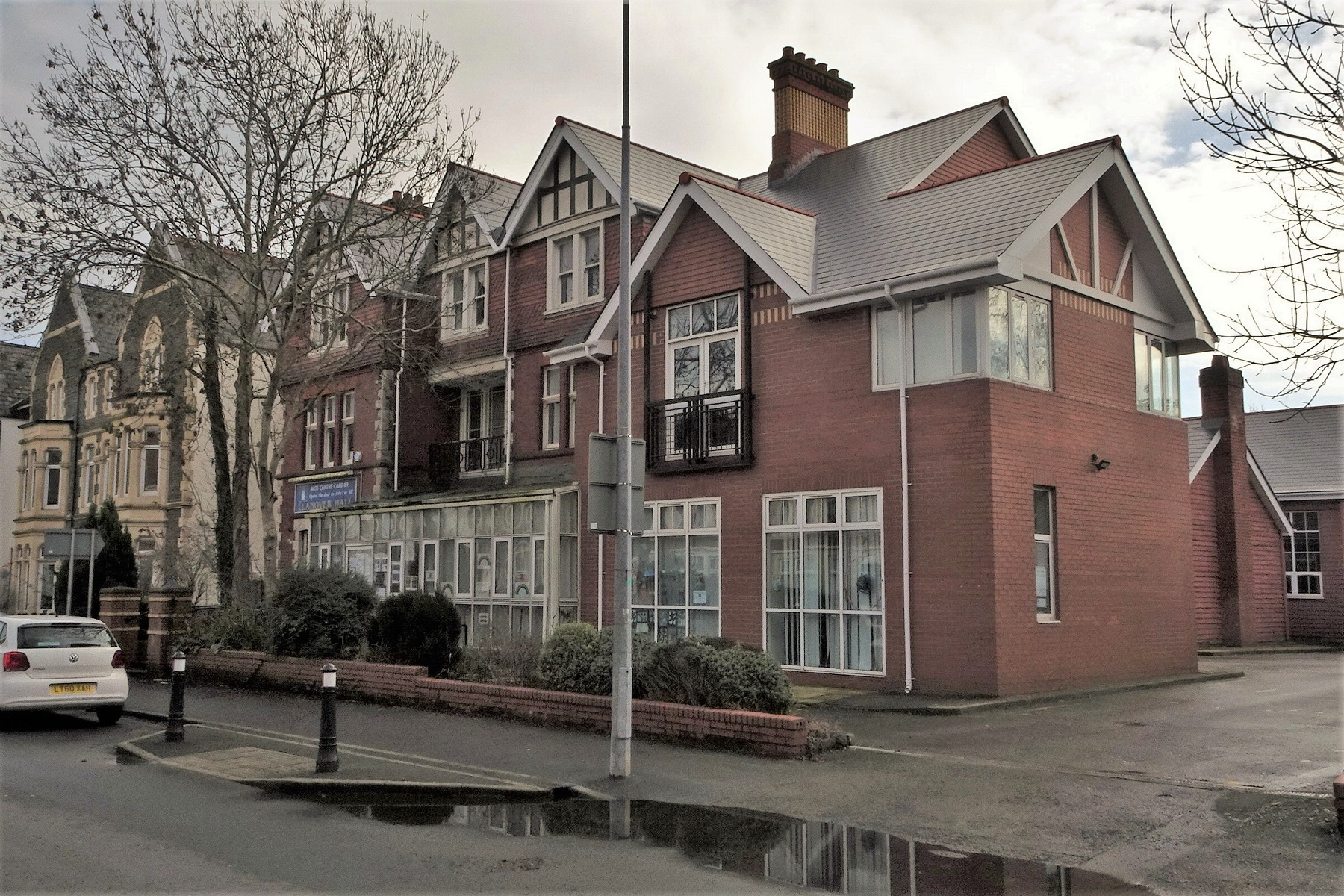
Llanover Hall Arts Centre, Cardiff in 2021

In 1850, Augusta Hall helped found Y Gymraes ("The Welshwoman"), the first Welsh-language periodical for women. (Augusta Hall) And in 1867 she had her cookery (The First Principles of Good Cookery published (Note: A facsimile of The First Principles of Good Cookery, with a six thousand word introduction by Bobby Freeman, was published by Brefi Press of Llanddewi Brefi, Tregaron, West Wales in 1991.), which was the only Welsh cookery book written in English at that time.

Augusta Hall was a patron of the Welsh Manuscripts Society, of the Welsh Collegiate Institution at Llandovery in West Wales, funded the compilation of a Welsh dictionary by Daniel Silvan Evans. She bought Welsh manuscripts of Taliesin Williams, Taliesin ab Iolo and the collection of Iolo Morganwg (Edward Williams) from his son. (Note: The manuscripts are now held in the National Museum of Wales in Cardiff.)

== The temperance movement ==
Another main interest of Augusta Hall was the temperance movement to which end she closed all the public houses on her estate, sometimes opening a modest temperance inn in their place, such as Y Seren Gobaith ('the Star of Hope') temperance inn, which replaced the Red Lion at Llanellen. She was an outspoken and lifelong critic of the evils of alcohol. Closely associated with her temperance work was religion in the form of militant Protestantism and she endowed two Calvinistic Methodist churches in the Abercarn area, with services conducted in the Welsh language, but a liturgy based on the Anglican Book of Common Prayer.

== Later life ==
Augusta Hall outlived her husband by nearly thirty years, living well into her nineties. Only one of their daughters survived to adulthood; Augusta, who in 1846 married Arthur Jones (1818–1895) of Llanarth, of an old Roman Catholic family. Their eldest son, Ivor Herbert, 1st Baron Treowen, became a Liberal MP and a Major-General during the First World War.

== Tributes ==
Aaron (2010) documented:

'‘Such was the calibre of the women Lady Llanover gathered about her in Abergavenny; not only Charlotte Guest but also Angharad Llwyd ... and Jane Williams, Ysgafell ... contributed prodigiously to Welsh learning and culture. Not only through her own work, then, but also through that of other women she inspired, Lady Llanover added new and rich dimensions to her epoch’s appreciation and understanding of Welsh difference.’

Since 1938 the Llanover Hall Arts Centre in Cardiff, Wales has carried Lady Llanover's name. (Note: Llanover Hall tour.)

== See also ==
- Benjamin Hall, 1st Baron Llanover
