= Ieuan ap Ieuan ap Madog =

Welsh language scribe

Ieuan ap Ieuan ap Madog was a Welsh language poet and scribe who was active in the 16th century as part of a group of scribes in Glamorgan.

== Life ==
Ieuan's existence is first documented in 1547 when he acquired a tenement in Glamorganshire, near where his brothers and father held farms. He belonged to a group of Welsh scribes, among them Llywelyn Siôn. While details of his life are unknown, his work survives in print and manuscripts, preserving Welsh language prose and poetry.

== Works ==
- Llanstephan MS 171 contains a collection of Welsh prose texts, including the story of Owen ab Urien; the Seven Sages of Rome; the story of the rudderless ship (Y Llong Foel).
- Llanstephan MS 178 contains an incomplete Welsh version translated from the English Voyage of the Wandering Knight.
- NLW MS 280D contains a bundle of loose and incomplete papers, among them Hymns of St. Curic.
