= Druidic alphabet =

Supposed writing system

Druidic alphabets are supposedly ancient writing systems believed by some neopagans to stem from the pagan culture of the Druids. One, the Coelbren y Beirdd (English: "Bards' alphabet") was created in the late eighteenth century by the literary forger Edward Williams, best known as Iolo Morganwg.

Scottish author and mythographer Lewis Spence propounded his theories about the Druidic alphabet in his 1945 publication The Magic Arts in Celtic Britain.

== See also ==
- Ogham: Historically attested alphabet used to write Primitive and Old Irish
