= Geraint the Blue Bard =

Character in Iolo Morganwg's works

Geraint the Blue Bard (Welsh: Geraint Fardd Glas) is a fictional 9th century Welsh bard and harpist, originally purported by Iolo Morganwg to be an historical figure. Geraint has been definitively shown by Welsh scholar G. J. Williams to be the invention of Iolo Morganwg, an author and antiquarian known for his numerous literary forgeries. Iolo called him Geraint Fardd Glas or Y Bardd Glas o'r Gadair ("the Blue Bard of the (Bardic) Chair") and associated him with his version of the early history of Morgannwg (Glamorgan).

Iolo makes the figure of Geraint, otherwise unattested in Welsh manuscript sources or tradition, the inventor of cynghanedd and brother of king Morgan of Morgannwg. He even went so far as to equate him with Asser in the court of Alfred the Great. He invented numerous 'Sayings' etc. attributed to Geraint and printed in the notorious third volume of the Myvyrian Archaiology of Wales. Iolo based his invention on some vague references in medieval English and Scots poetry to a certain Glascurion (the name "Geraint Fardd Glas" and its variants only occurs in Iolo's works) mentioned in Chaucer’s 'House of Fame':

Ther herde I pleyen on an harpe
That sowned bothe wel and sharpe,
Orpheus ful craftely,
And on his syde, faste by,
Sat the harper Orion,
And Eacides Chiron,
And other harpers many oon,
And the Bret Glascurion;

Glascurion figures as Glasgerion in the English and Scots folk ballad:

Glasgerion was a kings owne sonne,
And a harper he was good;
He harped in the kings chamber,
Where cuppe and candle stoode,
And soe did hee in the queens chamber,
Till ladies waxed wood.
And then bespake the kings daughter.
