= Druid's Prayer =

The "Druid's Prayer" (Welsh: Gweddi'r Derwydd) or "Gorsedd Prayer" (Gweddi'r Orsedd) is a prayer composed by Iolo Morganwg which is still a staple in the ritual of both gorseddau and Neo-Druidism and as such is often referred in to ritual as a prayer that unites all druids. Neo-Druids sometimes substitute the words y Dduwies ("the Goddess") for the original Duw ("God").

== Versions in Barddas ==
In the volume Barddas by Iolo Morganwg (edited and compiled by Reverend John Williams ab Ithel), there are six versions of the Gorsedd Prayer, both in Iolo's original Welsh and in English translation (the word gwynvyd, roughly corresponding to "heaven" is left untranslated).

=== Version One ===
Llyma Weddi'r Orsedd, a elwir Gweddi'r Gwyddoniaid (O Lyfr Mawr Margam)
Duw dy nerth, ag yn nerth Dioddef;
A dioddef dros y gwir, ag yn y gwir pob goleuni;
Ag yngoleuni pob Gwynfyd, ag yngwynfyd Cariad,
Ag ynghariad Duw, ag yn Duw pob daioni.

The Gorsedd Prayer, called the Prayer of the Gwyddoniaid (From the Great Book of Margam)
God, impart Thy strength;
And in strength, power to suffer;
And to suffer for the truth;
And in the truth, all light;
And in light, gwynvyd;
And in gwynfyd, love;
And in love, God;
And in God, all goodness.

=== Version Two ===
Llyma weddi'r Orsedd o Lyfr Trehaearn Brydydd Mawr
Dyro Dduw dy Nawdd;
Ag yn Nawdd, Pwyll;
Ag ymhwyll, Goleuni;
Ag yngoleuni, Gwirionedd;
Ag yngwirionedd, Cyfiawnder;
Ag ynghyfiawnder, Cariad;
Ag ynghariad, Cariad Duw;
Ag ynghariad Duw, pob Gwynfyd.

Duw a phob Daioni.

The Gorsedd Prayer, from the Book of Trahaiarn the Great Poet
Grant, God, Thy protection;
And in protection, reason;
And in reason, light;
And in light, truth;
And in truth, justice;
And in justice, love;
And in love, the love of God;
And in the love of God, gwynfyd.

God and all goodness.

=== Version Three ===
The below version is that usually adopted by various druidic groups, including Gorsedd Cymru and the Order of Bards, Ovates and Druids (OBOD), but the latter organisation normally replaces the word 'God' with 'Spirit'.

Llyma weddi'r orsedd o Lyfr arall
Dyro Dduw dy Nawdd;
Ag yn nawdd, nerth;
Ag yn nerth, Deall;
Ag yn Neall, Gwybod;
Ac yngwybod, gwybod y cyfiawn;
Ag yngwybod yn cyfiawn, ei garu;
Ag o garu, caru pob hanfod;
Ag ymhob Hanfod, caru Duw.

Duw a phob Daioni.

The Gorsedd Prayer, from another Book
Grant, O God, Thy protection;
And in protection, strength;
And in strength, understanding;
And in understanding, knowledge;
And in knowledge, the knowledge of justice;
And in the knowledge of justice, the love of it;
And in that love, the love of all existences;
And in the love of all existences, the love of God.

God and all goodness.
