= Davod =

Davod may refer to:

== Places ==
- Dávod, a village in southern Hungary

== People ==
- Davood Azad (born 1963), Iranian composer, Sufi vocalist
- Davoud Rashidi (1933–2016), Iranian actor
- Davod Reeves, musician on Fat Boys
- Davod Aur Edeyrn (fl. 1270), Welsh bard and grammarian
