= Edward Dafydd =

Welsh poet, died 1690

Edward Dafydd (died 1690), also known as Edward David, was a 17th-century Welsh poet from Margam, Glamorganshire.

== Prominence ==
By some Dafydd was considered the most prominent Glamorganshire bard of the 17th century. According to Iolo Morganwg, he was tutored by Llywelyn Siôn, who dwelt in Laleston, a neighbouring parish. None of his work is thought to have been produced after 1665.

Dafydd is believed to have been admitted as a graduate of the gathering known as Gorsedd Morganwg in 1620. In 1660, he served as its President. He died in 1690.
