= Thomas Price (Carnhuanawc) =

Welsh historian (1787–1848)

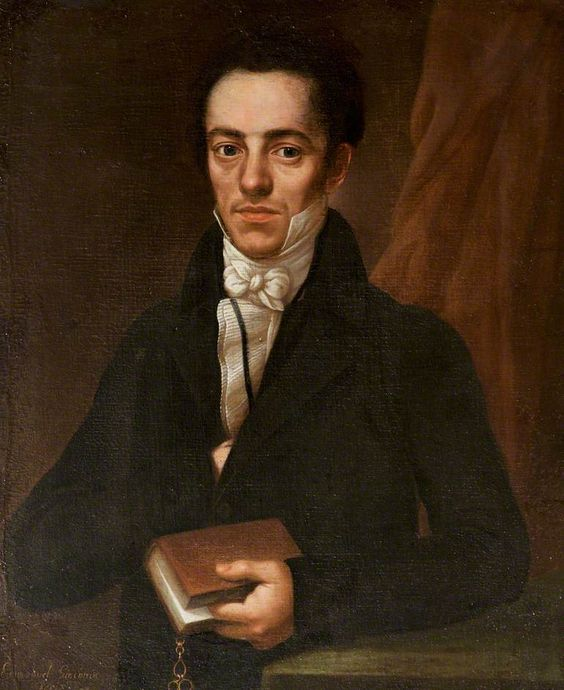
Portrait of Carnhuanawc (c. 1826) by "Emmanuel Giaconia" (pseudonym; possibly William Jones or Hugh Hughes), University of Wales Trinity Saint David, Lampeter

The Reverend Thomas Price (2 October 1787 – 7 November 1848) (known by the bardic name of Carnhuanawc, Sunny cairn) was born at Pencaerelin, in Llanfihangel Bryn Pabuan, near Builth Wells, Brecknockshire, in Mid Wales. He was an historian and a major Welsh literary figure of the early 19th century. He was also an essayist, orator, naturalist, educationalist, linguist, antiquarian, artist and musician. He contributed to learned and popular journals and was a leading figure in the revival of the Eisteddfod.

== Biography ==
Price was born at Pencaerelin, in Llanfihangel Bryn Pabuan, near Builth Wells into a religious family, his father was a vicar and his mother was the daughter of a vicar. In 1805 he attended Brecon Grammar School, now Christ College, Brecon, where he lodged in the town. While there he made constant visits to the home of local resident Theophilus Jones, the historian. During his visits he helped Jones with the production of the second (1809) volume of his History of the county of Brecknock by submitting plates of arms which he had drawn and coloured and engraved representations of archaeological remains which were taken from his original drawings.

Price was ordained as a deacon of the Church of England on 10 March 1811. In the following year he became a curate in Radnorshire, living at Builth Wells with his mother. He was subsequently incumbent of Llanfihangel Cwmdu, Breconshire. Thomas (1988) observed that he was a fluent speaker in both English and Welsh and was charismatic. She continued: 'More than all else, he was an ardent Welshman, and he patriotism was contagious.'

On 22 November 1833, Price and four other men met in the Sun Inn in Abergavenny and founded the Cymreigyddion y Fenni. He was a major influence on Lady Charlotte Guest, whom he assisted in her translation of the Mabinogion. And he was associated with the work of Augusta Hall, Baroness Llanover, to whom he taught Welsh. Thomas (1988) observed that Williams 'praised his audiences for patronizing the Welsh press and told them that cultural standards in Wales were far better than those in England.' She continued: 'And his audiences loved him.' In 1848, when his health was failing and as he had done for previous eisteddfodau, he spent most of the summer in Llanover planning the eisteddfod for that year, which he attended. However, within a month, he died. Thomas (1988) observed:

'Thus Wales had lost one of its most gifted and beloved sons, and one of its most ardent and practical patriots whose influence for the good of the Welsh language had been immense. Cymreigyddion y Fenni was never the same again.' (Italics in the original)

Price was an advocate of pan-Celticism and to this end, between 1824 and 1845, he learnt the Breton language. He also encouraged the British and Foreign Bible Society to fund the publication, in 1827, of Jean-François Le Gonidec's translation of the New Testament into Breton. In 1829 he visited Le Gonidec, whom he had assisted with the translation, at his home in Angoulême.

Price was a close friend of Théodore Hersart de La Villemarqué ("Kervarker"), the leading Breton literary figure of the day, who was editor of the collection of popular songs known as the Barzaz Breiz (Ballads of Brittany). Price brought him to a hugely successful series of eisteddfodau at Abergavenny.

== Works ==
- An Essay on the Physiognomy and Physiology of the Present Inhabitants of Britain. London: J. Rodwell. 1829.
- Hanes Cymru a Chenedl y Cymryo'r Cynoesoedd hyd at Farwolaeth Llywelyn ap Gruffydd. Crughywel: Thomas Williams. 1842.
- The literary remains of the Rev. Thomas Price, Carnhuanawc, vicar of Cwmdû, Breconshire, and rural dean, author of Hanes Cymru, Essays on the geographical progress of empire and civilization, etc etc. Volume I. Llandovery: William Rees. 1854.
- The literary remains of the Rev. Thomas Price, Carnhuanawc, vicar of Cwmdû, Breconshire, and rural dean, author of Hanes Cymru, Essays on the geographical progress of empire and civilization, etc. etc Volume II. Llandovery: William Rees. 1854.
