= Owen Jones (antiquary) =

Welsh antiquarian

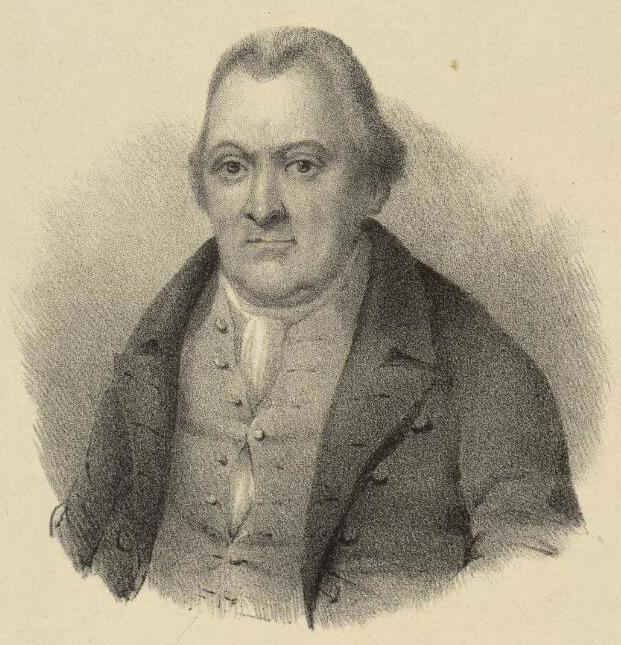
- Portread o Owen Jones (Owain Myfyr).
- Born: 3 September 1741
- Died: 26 September 1814 (aged 73)
- Occupation: Antiquarian, skinner

Owen Jones (3 September 1741 – 26 September 1814), known by his bardic name of Owain Myfyr, was a Welsh antiquarian.

== Life ==
Jones was born in Llanfihangel Glyn Myfyr in Denbighshire. In the mid-1760s he moved to London, where he entered the service of a firm of furriers, to whose business he ultimately succeeded.

He had from boyhood studied Welsh literature, and later devoted time and money to its collection. Assisted by Edward Williams of Glamorgan (Iolo Morganwg) and Dr. William Owen Pughe, he published, at a cost of more than £1000, the well-known Myvyrian Archaiology of Wales (1801–1807), a collection of pieces dating from the 6th to the 14th century. The manuscripts which he had brought together are deposited in the British Library; the material not utilized in the Myvyrian Archaiology amounts to 100 volumes, containing 16,000 pages of verse and 15,300 pages of prose.

Jones was the principal founder of the Gwyneddigion Society in London in 1770 for the encouragement of Welsh studies and literature; and in 1805 he began a miscellany, the Greal, of which only one volume appeared. An edition of the poems of Dafydd ap Gwilym was also issued at his expense.

He died in 1814 at his business premises in Upper Thames Street, London, and was buried in the churchyard of All-Hallows-the-Less. When the churchyard was severely damaged by bombing in World War II, his gravestone (which also commemorated his widow and her second husband, Robert Roberts) was removed, and eventually taken to Llanfihangel Glyn Myfyr.

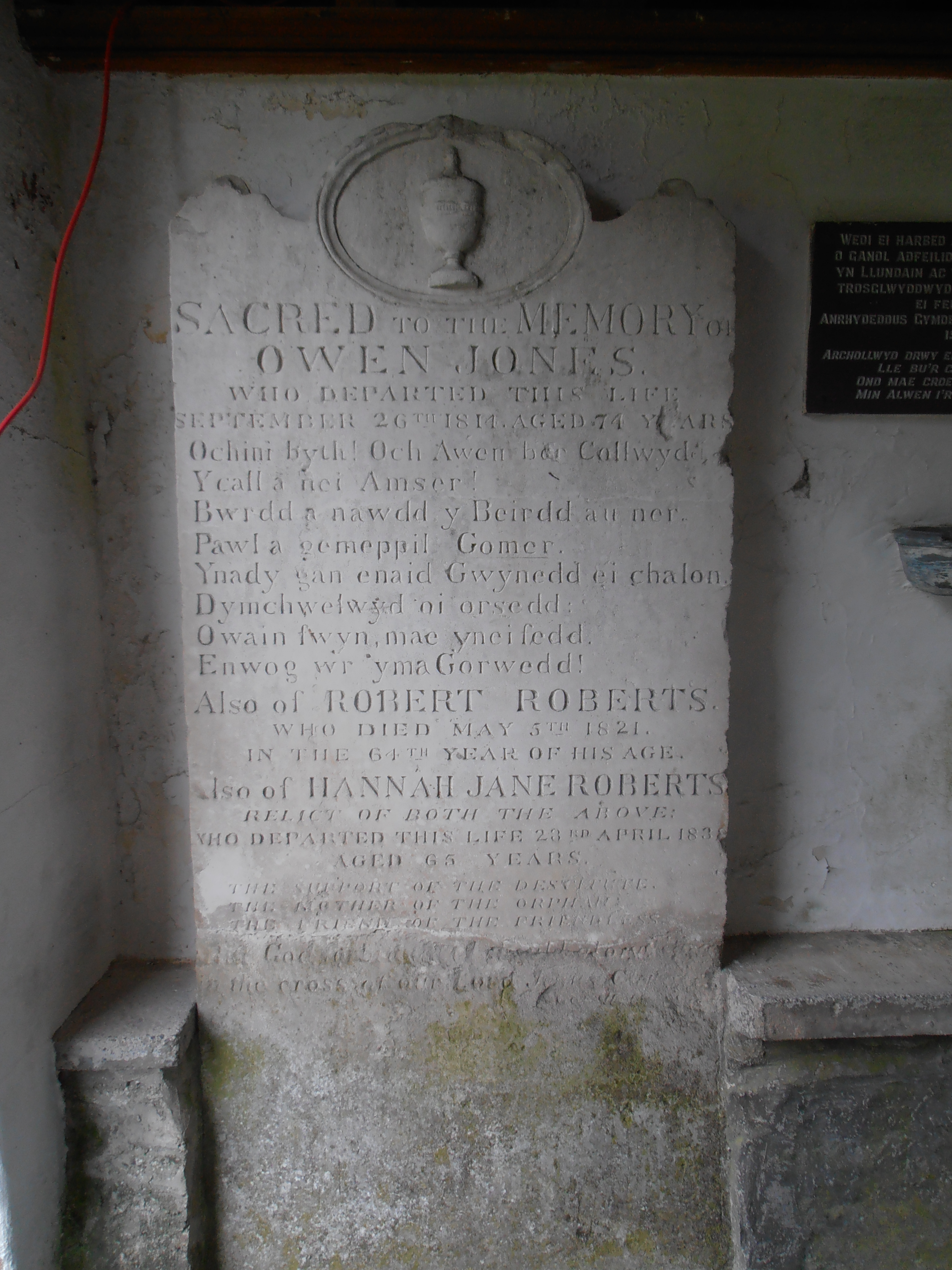
Owain Myfyr's gravestone, Llanfihangel Glyn Myfyr

== Personal life ==
In about 1806 Jones married his maidservant, Hannah Jane Jones (1772/3–1838), who was nearly 30 years his junior. They had one son, Owen Jones (1809–74), who became a well-known architect and designer; and either one or two daughters.
