= William Jenkins Rees =

Welsh priest and antiquarian

William Jenkins Rees (10 January 1772 – 18 January 1855) was a Welsh cleric and antiquary.

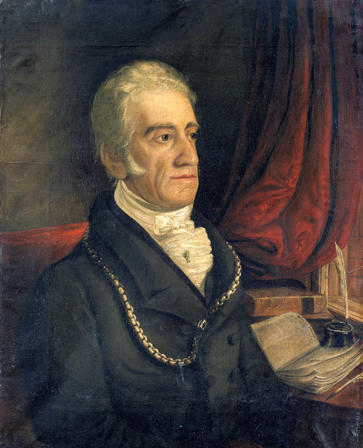
William Jenkins Rees, 1826 portrait by Hugh Hughes

== Life ==
The son of Rees Rees of Llan Dingad, Carmarthenshire, he was born in the parish. He was educated at Carmarthen grammar school, and on 12 April 1791 matriculated at Wadham College, Oxford. He graduated B.A. in 1795 and M.A. in 1797.

Taking holy orders, Rees first obtained the curacy of Stoke-Edith and Westhide, Herefordshire; and in 1807 the rectory of Casgob, Radnorshire, where he spent the rest of his life. In 1820 he was made a prebendary of Christ College, Brecon, and in 1840 a fellow of the Society of Antiquaries of London.

Rees died on 18 January 1855.

== Works ==
Rees is best known for the editorial work he did for the Welsh Manuscripts Society. The society's edition of the Liber Landavensis was transferred on the death of his nephew Rice Rees to him in 1839, and the book appeared in 1840. In 1853 Rees also edited for the society Lives of the Cambro-British Saints (text and English translation). Both of these works were subject to later criticism.

In 1803 Rees published A Short and Practical Account of the Principal Doctrines of Christianity, in 1809 an essay on Clerical Elocution, and 1811 a tract on pastoral work.

== Notes ==
Attribution

This article incorporates text from a publication now in the public domain: Lee, Sidney, ed. (1896). "Rees, William Jenkins". Dictionary of National Biography. Vol. 47. London: Smith, Elder & Co.
