= Siôn Bradford =

Welsh poet

Siôn Bradford (1706–1785) was a Welsh language poet, from Betws, Tir Iarll, Glamorgan, in south Wales.

Although a minor poet himself he is important as the poetic teacher of Edward Williams (Iolo Morganwg), and collaborated with him in his sometimes extravagant antiquarian researches.
