= The Myvyrian Archaiology of Wales =

Printed collection of medieval Welsh literature

The Myvyrian Archaiology of Wales is a printed collection of medieval Welsh literature, published in three volumes by the Gwyneddigion Society between 1801 and 1807. Until John Gwenogvryn Evans produced diplomatic editions of the important medieval Welsh manuscripts, the Myvyrian Archaiology provided the source text for many translators of medieval Welsh material. It was founded, and funded, by Owen Jones, who engaged William Owen Pughe as editor, and Edward Williams, better known as Iolo Morganwg, to search Wales for manuscripts.

The first volume, published in 1801, attempted to collect all Welsh poetry prior to 1370, with the exception of the work of Dafydd ap Gwilym, which had already been published. Volume two, also published in 1801, contained the Welsh Triads, the chronicles (versions of the Brut y Brenhinedd and Brut y Tywysogion) and other prose documents of a historical nature. Volume three, which did not appear until 1807, contained didactic literature, laws and music. All three were reprinted in a single volume, with some additional material, in 1870.

The majority of its material is genuine, although it does contain some of Iolo's forgeries, including the "third series" of Triads and two chronicles, the Brut Aberpergwm and the Brut Ieuan Brechfa, in volume two, and the Doethineb y Cymry ("wisdom of the Welsh") in volume three.
