= John Williams (Ab Ithel) =

Welsh antiquary and Anglican priest

John Williams (bardic name: Ab Ithel) (7 April 1811–27 August 1862), was an antiquary and Anglican priest. Born in Llangynhafal, Denbighshire Wales in 1811, he graduated from Jesus College, Oxford in 1835 to become the Anglican curate of Llanfor, Merionethshire, where he married Elizabeth Lloyd Williams. In 1843 he became perpetual curate of Nercwys, Flintshire, and rector of Llanymawddwy, Merionethshire, in 1849.

== Writing career ==
For much of his early life he adopted the pseudonym Cynhaval, after his birthplace in Llangynhafal, Denbighshire, however took the pseudonym Ab Ithel from the surname of his grandfather, William Bethell. His first book entitled The Church of England independent of the Church of Rome in all ages, concerned the relationship between the Church of England and Rome. This book was published in 1836. It was followed by another in 1844 on the ecclesiastical antiquities of Wales entitled Ecclesiastical Antiquities of the Cymry or The Ancient British Church. In 1856 Archdeacon Williams produced Rules of Welsh Poetry and Medical Practice of Rhinwallon and his Sons with the Welsh MSS. Society. By 1860 he had two more pieces of work ready for publication; Chronicle of the Princes, and Annales Cambriae were both published in Rolls series.

Williams was industrious both as a parish priest and as an antiquary. He was regarded by many of his contemporaries as one of the leading Welsh scholars of his day, and was able to exert a considerable and decidedly mixed influence on the course of Welsh scholarship. Nonetheless, his enthusiasm and Welsh nationalist fervour, cause some to criticize him of being uncritical in his approach to the historical record and strongly influenced by Edward Williams (Iolo Morganwg, 1747–1826).

== Professional contributions ==
In 1846, together with Harry Longueville Jones (1806–1870), another cleric and antiquary, Williams founded the Cambrian Archaeological Association, whose journal, Archaeologia Cambrensis, he edited until 1853, when he and Jones quarrelled over editorial policy. He also published an edition and translation of the Gododdin in 1852, established the Cambrian Journal, which he edited from 1854 until his death, and was prominent in the Welsh Manuscripts Society, editing four of its publications. The Llangollen Eisteddfod of 1858, which he organized together with Richard Williams Morgan ('Mor Meirion', c. 1815 – c. 1889) and Joseph Hughes ('Carn Ingli', 1803–1863), caused much derision and embarrassment; Williams' own family won several prizes, and Thomas Stephens (1821–1875) was adjudicated against because he suggested that the story of Madog ab Owain Gwynedd's American expeditions was not true. Williams was nevertheless considered for the chair of Celtic at Oxford University, and he was appointed by the government in 1858 to complete the editions of the medieval Welsh chronicles Annales Cambriae and Brut y Tywysogion, which had been left incomplete by Aneurin Owen (1792–1851), and which were published in 1860. His editorial work was later criticised by academics due to his lack of the diplomatic skills for interpreting medieval manuscripts.

== Religious appointments ==
Williams became rector of Llanenddwyn and Llanddwywe, Merionethshire, in 1862, by which time he was very ill, and he died in the same year. The Ab Ithel Memorial Fund was established in his memory.

== Writings, letters, and collections ==
Many of the letters and papers of Rev. John Williams ('Ab Ithel') and his family exist today in drafts or incomplete copy. His collection includes letters to his family 1832–1898; page-proofs of parts of Brut y Tywysogion; drafts in manuscript of several of Ab Ithel's printed works, including Y Gododdin, The Traditionary Annals of the Cymry, Druidism, Brut y Tywysogion, and Annales Cambriae; contributions to the Cambrian Journal; his address at the Conwy Eisteddfod, 1861; papers relating to his collation to the rectory of Llanymawddwy, 1849; 'The Church of England independent of the Church of Rome in all ages'; sermons in English and Welsh; 'A few plain and practical Observations on Anglican Education'; the prize essay on the question 'whether the British Druids offered human sacrifices' by 'Hu Gadarn'; an essay entitled Traethawd ar Ddarganfyddiad yr America Gan Madog ab Owain Gwynedd, yn nghylch y ddeuddegfed ganrif' by 'Columbus'; an essay 'On the state of Agriculture and the progress of Arts & Manufactures in Britain, during the period & under the influence of the Druidical System' by Rev. John Jones, Llanllyfni (see Archaeologia Cambrensis, Supplement 1850); 'Y Telynwr Cymreig, sef cyfarwyddiadau i ddysgu'r Delyn' by 'Dafydd Frenin'; four essays on 'Y manteision a ddeillia i'r Cymry o ddysgu yr iaith Seisnig' by 'Uthr Bendragon', 'Eiddil', 'Gwir Gymro', and 'Y cynyg cynta' 'rioed'; a 'History of Wales to the death of Llewelyn'; sections of a work on Christianity in Britain; letters addressed to Ab Ithel and also to his wife and daughters; press cuttings and extracts; sketches and medical and household recipes, and letters, 1884–1885, relating to the Ab Ithel Memorial Fund.

== Bibliography ==
- Phillimore, Egerton (ed.), 1890/1 'The publication of the Welsh historical records', Y Cymmrodor 11 (1890/1) pp. 133–75.
