= Hugh Hughes (painter) =

Welsh painter, engraver and writer (1790–1863)

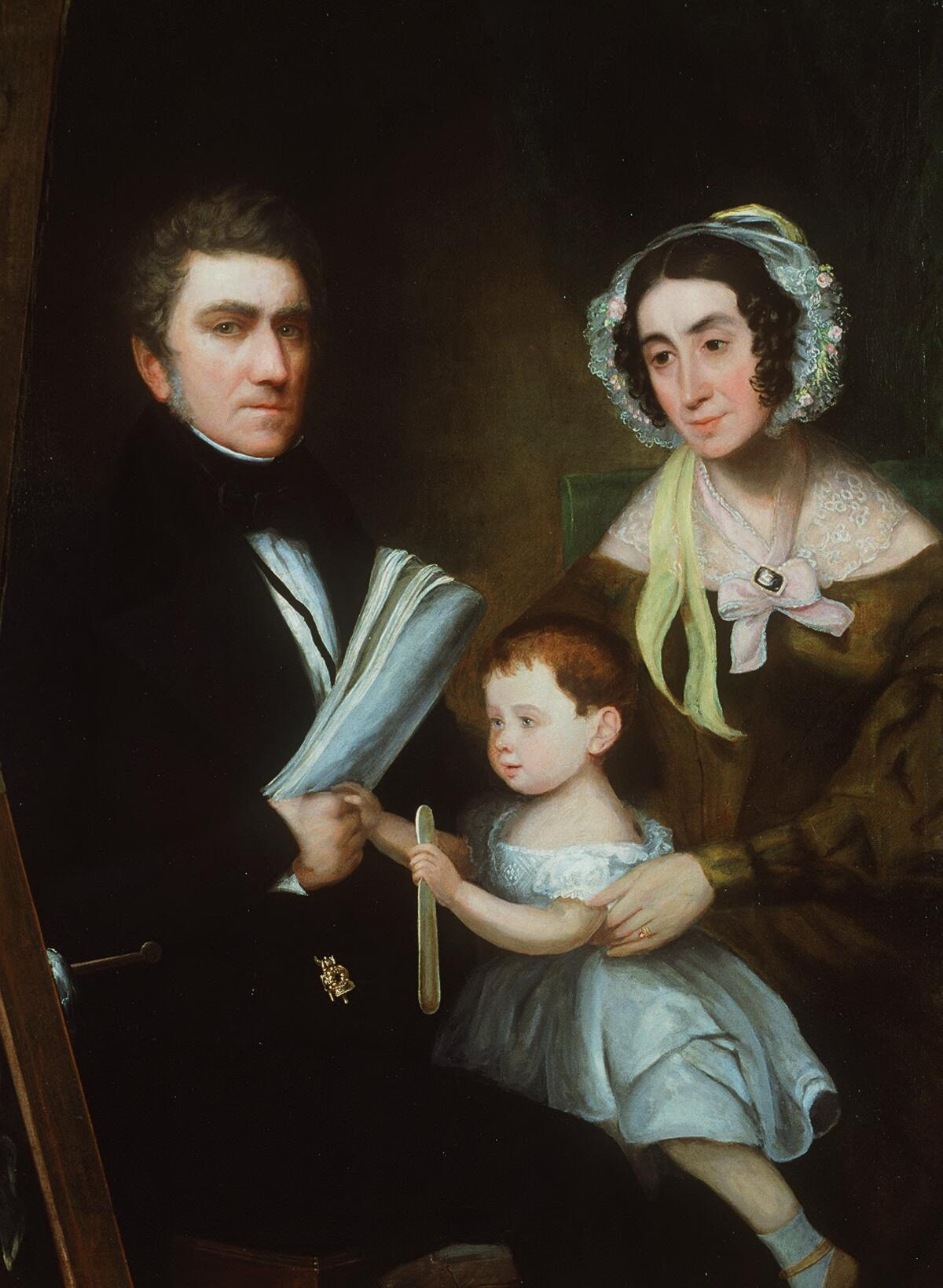
Hugh Hughes, Portrait of the Artist with his Wife and Daughter (c. 1850). National Library of Wales, Aberystwyth

Hugh Hughes (1790–1863) was a Welsh painter, engraver and writer.

== Life ==
Born at Pwllygwichiad, near Llandudno, the son of Thomas Hughes, by Jane, his wife, he was baptised at Llandudno, according to the parish register, on 20 February 1790. He lost his parents in childhood and was educated by his maternal grandfather, Hugh Williams of Meddiant Farm, in Llansantffraid Glan Conwy, Denbighshire. Hughes was apprenticed to an engraver in Liverpool; from there he moved to London as an improver, and took lessons in oil painting.

From 1819 to 1822 Hughes worked at Meddiant Farm on The Beauties of Cambria, his best-known work; he returned to London after 1823, and was living in Soho in 1827. A radical in religion and politics, he signed a petition in favour of passing the Catholic Emancipation Bill in about 1828. The London leaders of the Welsh Calvinistic body, to which he belonged, then expelled him from their communion. Hughes denounced this act of intolerance in pamphlets and letters to Seren Gomer (1828–1830). At a meeting of delegates of the Calvinistic Methodists held at Bala in 1831, a resolution was passed deprecating interference with the exercise of political rights. Hughes was not, however, reinstated as member of the denomination.

After a time Hughes went over to the Independents, and later to the Plymouth Brethren. In 1832 he wrote, under the pseudonym "Cristion", on church establishments and tithes in controversy with the Rev. Evan Evans (Ieuan Glan Geirionydd).

Hughes died at Great Malvern 11 March 1863, and was buried in the cemetery there.

== Works ==
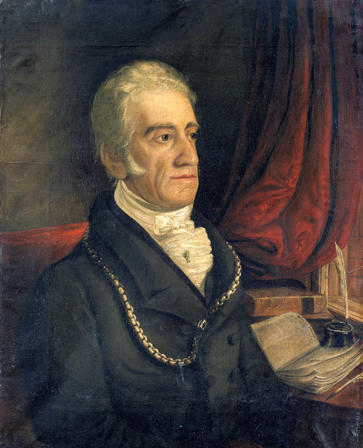
Hugh Hughes, Portrait of William Jenkins Rees (1826)

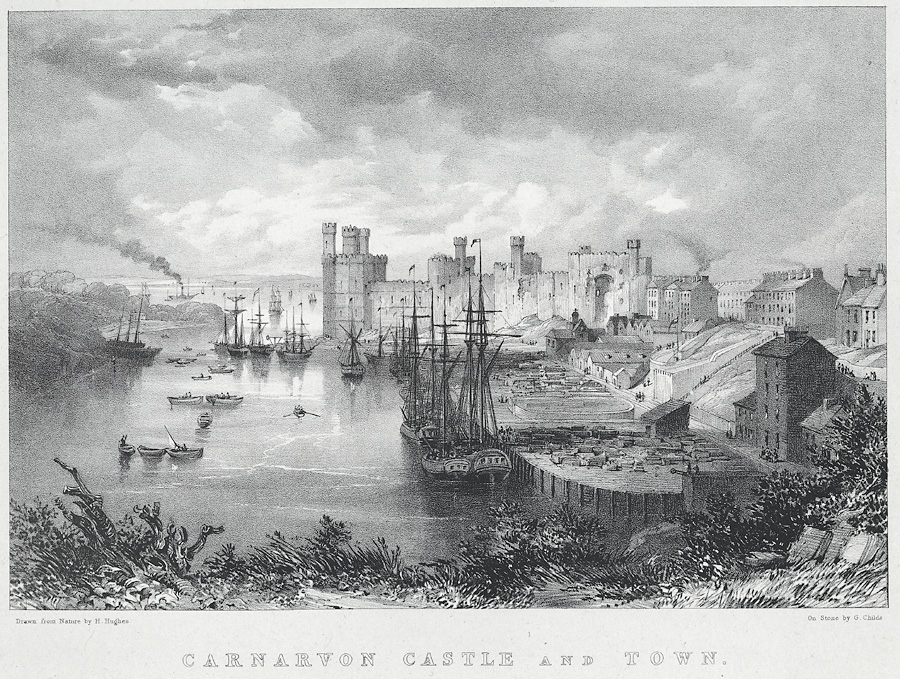
Carnarvon Castle and Town, 1850. A lithograph from the Welsh Landscape Collection at the National Library of Wales

The earliest known work by Hughes is a portrait (dated 1812) of the Rev. John Evans (1723–1817) of Bala, which was engraved in Volume III of the Drysorfa.

Hughes's major woodcuts appear in his Beauties of Cambria (Carmarthen, 1823) in which all the views were engraved by himself, 58 from his own drawings; he has been compared to Thomas Bewick. He also made lithographs of Welsh scenery. He made caricatures of the commissioners of education sent to Wales (1846–47). Some of his sketches, including a map of North Wales under the name Dame Venedotia, Pitt's Head near Beddgelert, and others of the neighbourhood of Snowdon, were published at Caernarfon. His sketch of Pwllheli and St. Tudwall's Road is in Humphrey's Book of Views.

Hughes also published:

- Hynafion Cymreig, a work on Welsh antiquities, Carmarthen, 1823.
- Y Trefnyddion a'r Pabyddion, 1828(?).
- Lectures delivered before the London Cymmrodorion, in Seren Gomer, 1831.
- Y Papur Newydd Cymreig, 1836 (a Welsh newspaper), wrongly ascribed to another in Cardiff Eisteddfod Transactions, 1883.
- Y Drefn i Ddyogelu purdeb Bywyd, 1849.
- The Genteelers, a sarcastic political pamphlet.
- Yr Eglwys yn yr Awyr, essay in Y Traethodydd, 1853.

He also edited three volumes of sermons by his father-in-law, David Charles; the one published in 1846 contained a memoir.

The holdings of the National Library of Wales include a collection of works by Hugh Hughes.

== Family ==
Some time after 1823 Hughes married Sarah Charles, daughter of the Rev. David Charles of Carmarthen; she died on 28 December 1873 in Aberystwyth. Their three children died young.
