= Undeb Cenedlaethol Athrawon Cymru =

Welsh trade union

UCAC
- Undeb Cenedlaethol Athrawon Cymru
- Founded: 1940; 86 years ago
- Headquarters: Aberystwyth, Ceredigion
- Location: Wales
- Members: ▲3,644 (2024)
- General Secretary: Ioan Rhys Jones
- National President: Rhun Llwyd
- Affiliations: TUC
- Website: www.athrawon.com

Undeb Cenedlaethol Athrawon Cymru (UCAC; National Union of Teachers of Wales) is a trade union for teachers and lecturers in Wales. It was formed in December 1940, when a number of teachers in Wales felt that the teaching unions which they belonged to did not give due respect to the Welsh language. The union performs all the functions of a teaching union - negotiating the salary of members, campaigning for better working conditions, and supporting its members. Its administration is conducted through the medium of the Welsh language. Throughout its history, UCAC has campaigned for Welsh-medium education and an independent education system for Wales.

The union’s main objectives at its inception in 1940 were to ensure a better education system for Wales and to protect the interests of the individual teacher.

It is affiliated to the UK Trades Union Congress (since 1994), since under current TUC rules it is not permissible to affiliate only to TUC Cymru.

Its main office is in Aberystwyth, Ceredigion.

Its archives are in Cardiff University Library’s Special Collections and Archives.
