= Siôn ap Hywel =

Medieval Welsh poet

Siôn ap Hywel ap Llywelyn Fychan (fl. c.1490-1532) was a Welsh language poet.

Siôn ap Hywel composed poems on themes of love and religion. He is noted for his elegy on the death of fellow Welsh poet Tudur Aled, in which he mentioned the 'Dull Edern Dafod Aur' in the elegy written by Davod Aur Edeyrn, (Edern Of The Golden Tongue) a dosbarth (arrangement or grammar) of the orthography of the Welsh language and of the form of words.
