= Cymreigyddion y Fenni =

Welsh-language society in Abergavenny

Cymdeithas Cymreigyddion y Fenni, which translates as the Abergavenny Welsh Society, is a Welsh language society in Abergavenny which was founded in 1833. The society has a motto, Oes y byd i'r iaith Gymraeg, which translates as "long live the Welsh language", or more literally "the age of the world to the Welsh language".

== The launch of the Society ==
Thomas Price (Carnhuanawc) (1854) documented:

'On Friday, the 22nd November, 1833, the Oymdeithas Cyrareigyddion y Fenni, or Welsh Literary Society of Abergavenny, was formed by five and twenty respectable and zealous Welshmen of the town and neighbourhood, who assembled at the Sun Inn, kept by Mr. John Michael. The Rev. John Evans, of Llanofer, was appointed President; Mr. Thomas Bevan, of Llanwenarth, Secretary; Mr. T. E. Watkins, Eiddil Ifor, of Blaenafon, Bard; and the Rev. Thomas Price, of Orickhowel, Correspondent of this Institution. The officers of the Society were chosen, several resolutions passed, and twenty-six members enrolled; the name of the Rev. Thomas Price being placed first on the list, as a unanimous token of respect.'

T.E Watkins was an historian and a weigher at the Blaina Ironworks. From 1834 to 1837, he won prizes for twelve historical essays in the eisteddfodau of the Society. One of his essays, Hanes Llanffwyst (History of Llanfoist), was translated into English by the Rev Evan Price from Ebbw Vale, and was edited and published in 1922 by historian Joseph Bradney. It was then republished in 1998 by local historian Chris Barber, from Llanfoist, in association with Llanfoist & District Historical Society.

The minutes of the meeting recorded that the men were all 'gentlemen' and 'supporters of the ancient British tongue'. Thomas Price was extremely well-known to those who attended the meeting as an extremely strong advocate of the Welsh language, his fine oratory and his strong patrionism. Also, in 1823 he had formed the Welsh Literary Society of Brecon, and he was elected as its first President.

== The initial development of the Society ==
The Society held its second meeting on the 27th. It agreed upon its rules of management, it elected a committee and it added fourteen new names to its list of members. The following members were elected officers:

'President, the Revd John Evans, Vicar of Llanover; Vice-President, William Price, Esq., lawyer in Abergavenny; Bard, Mr T.E. Watkins (Eiddil Ifor); Secretary, Mr Thomas Bevan (Caradawc); Correspondent, the Revd Thomas Price, the well-known vicar of Cwm-du and Llangatwg, Breconshire.'

At an early stage, the Society adopted the ancient Welsh motto Oes y byd i'r Iaith Gymraeg, which Thomas Price translated as 'The duration of the world to the Welsh language' or 'May the Cambrian language last as long as the world!'. Within three months its foundation, the Society enrolled seventy-five members who included:

Benjamin Hall, 1st Baron Llanover, and Augusta Hall, Baroness Llanover; Lady Coffin Greenly of Titley in Herefordshire; Mr. Williams of Llangybi; Monsieur Riew from Brittany; Charles Morgan, 1st Baron Tredegar; and Sir John and Lady Char.

Thomas Price documented the proceedings of several anniversaries of the Society. One of them was the fourth anniversary, which was held on the 23rd and the 24th of November 1836 in the Free Grammar School-room of Abergavenny, which he opined was 'rendered memorable by the establishment of the Welsh Manuscripts Society, which was first suggested there by W. Williams, Esq., of Aberpergwm.'

In 1852, poet William Thomas (Islwyn) from Mynyddislwyn, near Ynysddu, began his association with the Society, having made the acquaintanceship of Lady Llanover, at whose suggestion he adopted Islwyn as his bardic name. In the following year Thomas won a prize at the 1853 Abergavenny Eisteddfod for his elegy to Carnhuanawc.

== The present ==
The Society has a committee. It meets monthly and runs a programme of activities, and is one of three Welsh language groups which meet locally. The Cwmdeithas Gwenynen Gwent Lady Llanover Society has a committee and holds events on harp music in Llanfoist. Merched y Wawr has an Abergavenny branch, which meets in the town and undertakes activities.
