= Iolo Morganwg =

Welsh antiquarian and poet (1747–1826)

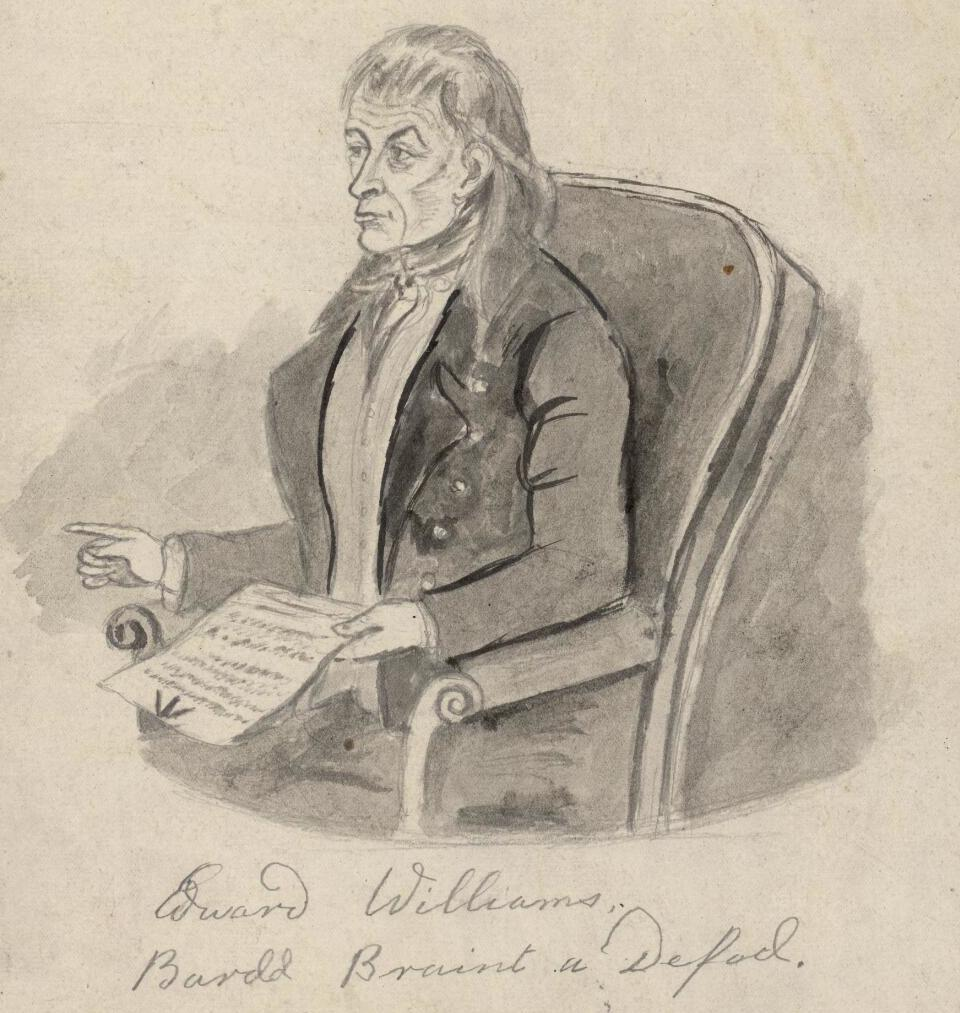
- Drawing of Iolo Morganwg (c. 1800) by an unknown artist, in the National Library of Wales
- Born: Edward Williams; 10 March 1747; Pen-onn, Vale of Glamorgan, Wales
- Died: 18 December 1826 (aged 79)
- Occupations: Stonemason; poet; collector
- Writing career
- Language: Welsh

Edward Williams, better known by his bardic name Iolo Morganwg (Welsh: [ˈjɔlɔ mɔrˈɡanʊɡ]; 10 March 1747 – 18 December 1826), was a Welsh antiquarian, poet and collector. He was seen as an expert collector of Medieval Welsh literature, but it emerged after his death that he had forged several manuscripts, notably some of the Third Series of Welsh Triads. Even so, he had a lasting impact on Welsh culture, notably in founding the secret society known as the Gorsedd, through which Iolo Morganwg successfully co-opted the 18th-century Eisteddfod revival. The philosophy he spread in his forgeries has had an enormous impact upon neo-Druidism. His bardic name is Welsh for "Iolo of Glamorgan".

== Early life ==
Edward Williams was born in Pen-onn, near Llancarfan, Vale of Glamorgan, and raised in the village of Flemingston (or Flimston; Trefflemin in Welsh). He followed his father as a stonemason. In Glamorgan, he took an interest in manuscript collection, and learnt to compose Welsh poetry from poets such as Lewis Hopkin, Rhys Morgan, and especially Siôn Bradford.

In 1773, he moved to London, where the antiquary Owen Jones introduced him to the city's Welsh literary community, and where he became a member of the Gwyneddigion Society: he would later also be active in the Cymreigyddion Society. In 1777 he returned to Wales, where he married and tried farming, but without success. During this time he produced his first forgeries.

Williams's son, Taliesin (bardic name, Taliesin ab Iolo), whom he had named after the early medieval bard Taliesin, later went on to collect his manuscripts in 26 volumes, a selection being published as the Iolo Manuscripts by the Welsh Manuscripts Society in 1848.

== Literary career ==
From an early date Williams was concerned with preserving and maintaining the literary and cultural traditions of Wales. He produced a large number of manuscripts as evidence for his claims that ancient Druidic tradition had survived the Roman conquest, the conversion of the populace to Christianity, the persecution of bards under King Edward I, and other adversities. His forgeries develop an elaborate mystical philosophy, which he claimed as a direct continuation of ancient Druidic practice. Williams's reportedly heavy use of laudanum may have been a contributing factor.

Williams first came to public notice in 1789 for Barddoniaeth Dafydd ab Gwilym, a collection of the poetry of the 14th-century Dafydd ap Gwilym. Included were a large number of hitherto unknown poems by Dafydd that he claimed to have found; these are regarded as Williams's first forgeries.

His success led him to return to London in 1791, where he founded the Gorsedd, a community of Welsh bards, at a ceremony on 21 June 1792 at Primrose Hill. He organised the occasion according to what he claimed were ancient Druidic rites. In 1794 he published some of his own poetry, which was later collected in a two-volume Poems, Lyric and Pastoral. Essentially his only genuine work, it proved quite popular.

Williams worked with Owen Jones and William Owen Pughe on The Myvyrian Archaiology of Wales, a three-volume collection of medieval Welsh literature published in 1801–1807. This relied partly on manuscripts in Williams's collection, some his forgeries. The forged material included a false Brut chronicle and a book attributed to Saint Cadoc. The second volume, which collected the Welsh Triads, contained an additional "third series" of forged triads, as well as Williams's alterations to the authentic ones.

After Williams's death some of his collection was compiled into The Iolo Manuscripts by his son, Taliesin Williams. His papers were used by many later scholars and translators, and for reference by Lady Charlotte Guest as she translated the prose collection Mabinogion. She did not, however, rely on Williams's editions of the tales themselves, except for Hanes Taliesin. Later still, further Williams forgeries were published in a text known as Barddas. This work, published in two volumes in 1862 and 1874, was claimed to be a translation of works by Llywelyn Siôn, detailing the history of the Welsh bardic system from its ancient origins to the present day. Though it contains nothing of authentic Druidic lore, it is the fullest account of the mystical cosmology Williams developed.

Other works by Williams include the "Druid's Prayer", still used by the Gorsedd and by neo-Druid groups, a treatise on Welsh metrics called Cyfrinach Beirdd Ynys Prydain ("The Mystery of the Bards of the Isle of Britain"), published posthumously in 1828, and a hymn series published as Salmau yr Eglwys yn yr Anialwch ("Psalms of the church in the wilderness") in 1812.

== Philosophy ==
Iolo's philosophy represented a fusion of Christian and Arthurian influences, a romanticism comparable to that of William Blake and the Scottish poet and forger James MacPherson, the revived antiquarian enthusiasm for all things "Celtic", and such elements of bardic heritage as had genuinely survived among Welsh-language poets. Part of his aim was to assert the Welshness of South Wales, particularly his home region of Glamorgan, against the prevalent idea that North Wales represented the purest survival of Welsh traditions. The metaphysics elucidated in his forgeries and other works proposed a theory of concentric "rings of existence", proceeding outward from Annwn (the Otherworld) through Abred and Ceugant to Gwynfyd (purity or Heaven).

Outside his shop in Cowbridge was a sign saying his sugar was from plantations that employed no slaves. However, he contested a will in order to receive a legacy from one of his three brothers, all of whose plantations in Jamaica used slave labour.

By 1799 he had become a Unitarian, and was a leading spirit when a Unitarian Association was formed in South Wales in 1802. It was he who drew up its Rheolau a Threfniadau (Rules and Procedures), published in 1803.

== Bardic alphabet ==
Bardic Alphabet

Iolo Morganwg developed his own runic system based on an ancient druid alphabet system, in Welsh Coelbren y Beirdd ("the Bardic Alphabet"). It was said to be the alphabetic system of the ancient druids. It consisted of 20 main letters, and 20 others "to represent elongated vowels and mutations." These symbols were to be represented in a wooden frame, known as peithynen.

== Exposure ==
Towards the end of the 19th century, the grammarian Sir John Morris-Jones was involved in exposing Morganwg as a forger, which led to the bard being labelled a charlatan. Morris-Jones called Morganwg "hateful" and said it would be an age "before our history and literature are clean of the traces of his dirty fingers."

After the First World War, the scholar Griffith John Williams (1892–1963) was the first to make a full study of Morganwg's work, consulting original documents donated to the National Library of Wales by Iolo's descendants in 1917. Williams aimed to find out exactly how much of Morganwg's output was based on imagination rather than fact. He established that the poems Morganwg attributed to Dafydd ap Gwilym were forgeries. His researches led him to become a defender of Iolo's reputation as well as a critic.

It has been suggested that some of Iolo's claims were supported by oral tradition: recent research has revealed that the tale of Ieuan Gethin, a soldier in the Glyndŵr revolt, might have basis in fact.

== Legacy ==
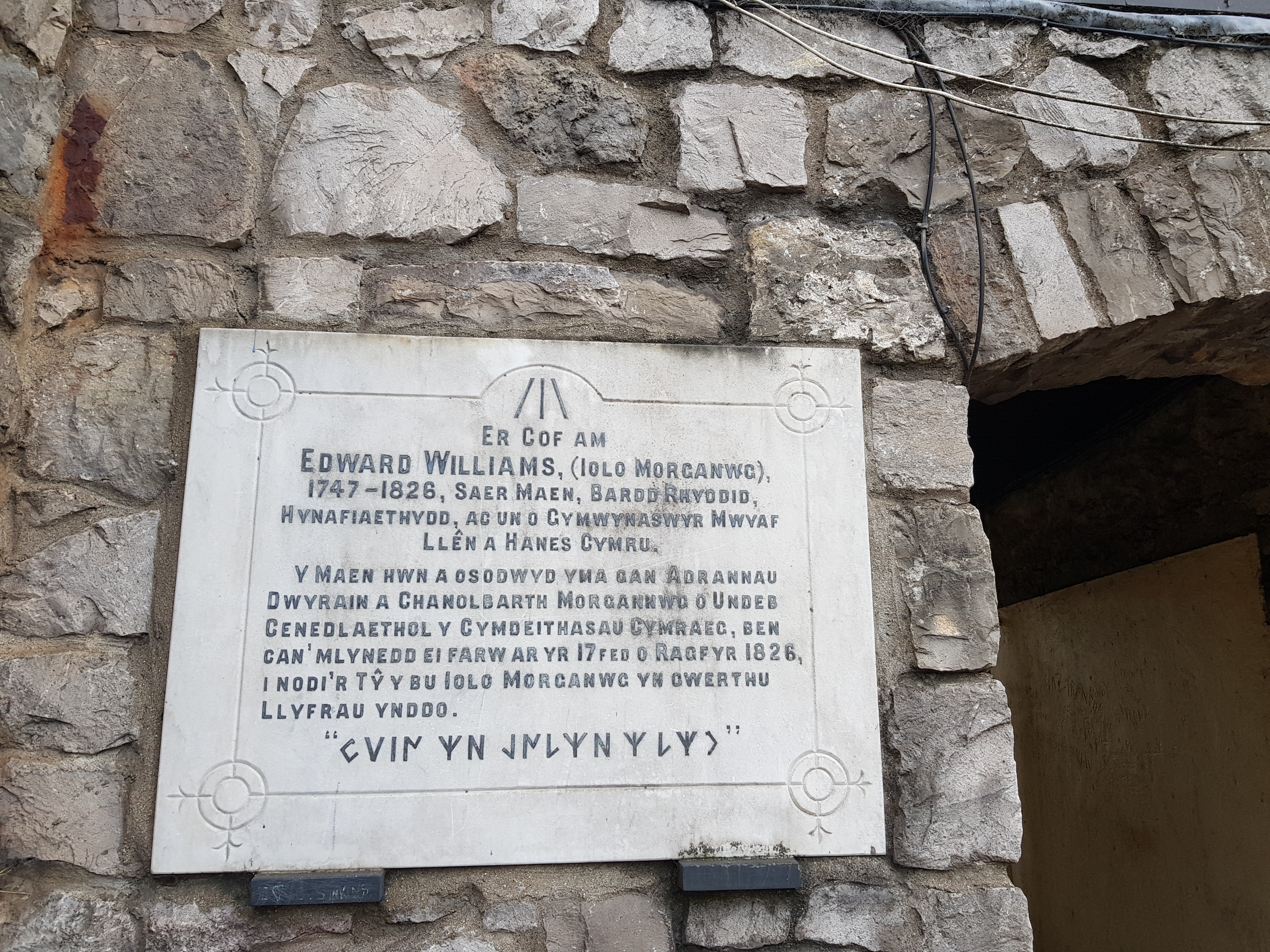
Commemorative plaque for Edward Williams, erected in 1926, marking the location of his bookshop in Cowbridge, with "Gwir yn erbyn y byd" ("Truth against the world") written in Coelbren y Beirdd letters

In 1926, in honor of the hundredth anniversary of Morganwg's death, a plaque was mounted at the location of his old shop. It reads:

This stone was placed here by the East and Mid-Glamorgan sections of the National Union of Welsh Language Societies on the centenary of his death on the 17th of December 1826 to mark the house in which he sold books.

A memorial plaque was erected in 2009, on the approximate site of the first Gorsedd ceremony, held on London's Primrose Hill in 1792, and another memorial stone on Stalling Down near Cowbridge, where the first Gorsedd ceremony in Wales took place in 1795.

Such was the extent of his forgery that, even into the 21st century, some of his tampered versions of medieval Welsh texts are better known than the original versions.

A Welsh-language school in Cowbridge, Ysgol Iolo Morganwg, is named after him, and Super Furry Animals vocalist Gruff Rhys dedicated a song to him on his 2014 album, American Interior.

== Family tree ==
Iolo Morganwg (Edward Williams); 1747–1826
Taliesin ab Iolo (Taliesin Williams); 1787–1847
Edward Williams; 1826–1886
Aneurin Williams; 1859–1924	Penry Williams; 1866–1945
Iolo Aneurin Williams; 1890–1962
Edward Williams; 1921–2013

== See also ==
- Geraint the Blue Bard
- List of 18th-century British working-class writers
- Kingdom of Powys
