= Welsh Manuscripts Society =

1837 literary organisation

The Welsh Manuscripts Society, also known as the Society for the Publication of Ancient Welsh Manuscripts, was a learned society concerned with the study and publication of early Welsh and British manuscripts. It was established in 1837 in Abergavenny, in the historic county of Monmouthshire in South East Wales, by six members of the Cymreigyddion y Fenni.

== History ==
Thomas Price (Carnhuanawc) (1854) recorded that William Williams (1788–1855), a member of the long-established Williams family of Aberpergwm, Glamorganshire, and the eldest brother of Maria Jane Williams, suggested the establishment of the society at the third anniversary of the Cymreigyddion y Fenni, which was held on 23 and 24 November 1836 in the Free Grammar school-room of Abergavenny.

The society had the purpose of collecting, studying and, as a text publication society, of publishing manuscripts relating to the ancient poetry, prose and historiography of Britain and Wales. Thomas Price (Carnhuanawc) habitually commended the important new books that the Society published in the speeches that he delivered at the eisteddfodau of the Cymreigyddion y Fenni.

In 1856 the society published a Welsh language grammar which is said to have been written by Davod Aur Edeyrn. Its final publication was Barddas; or, a collection of original documents, illustrative of the theology, wisdom and usages of the Bardo-Druidic system of the isle of Britain, which was edited and translated by Rev. John Williams (Ab Ithel). The first volume appeared in 1862; and the second volume, in an incomplete form, in 1874.

William Rees of Llandovery, Carmarthenshire, was the printer and publisher for the society.
