= William Owen Pughe =

Welsh antiquarian and grammarian

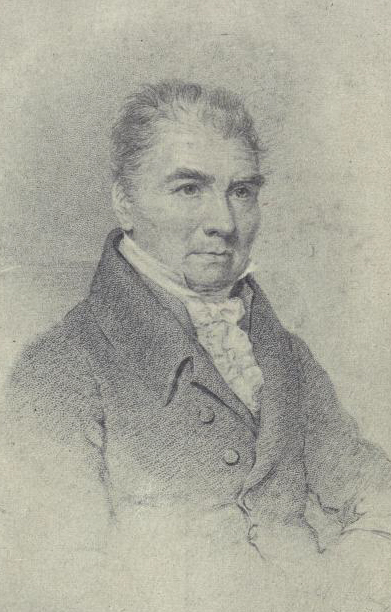
William Owen Pughe

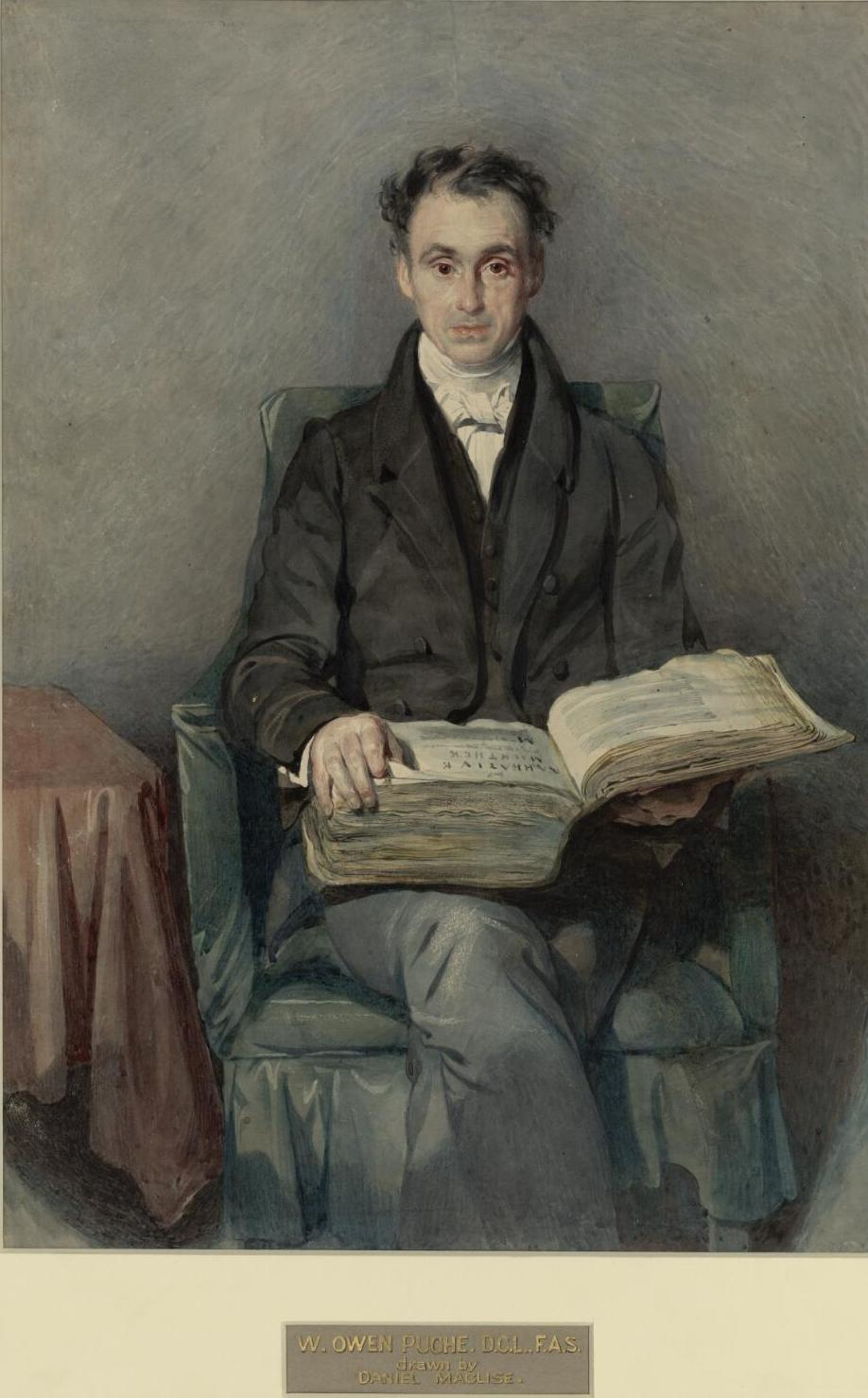
Portrait of William Owen Pughe by Daniel Maclise

William Owen Pughe (7 August 1759 – 4 June 1835) was a Welsh antiquarian and grammarian best known for his Welsh and English Dictionary, published in 1803, but also known for his grammar books and "Pughisms" (neologisms).

== Biography ==
He was born William Owen at Llanfihangel-y-pennant, Merionethshire, but the family moved to Ardudwy when William was about seven. He relocated to London in 1776. It was here that he got to know Owen Jones. Initially he worked as a clerk in a solicitor's office, subsequently becoming a teacher of Algebra in a girls' boarding school and also as a private tutor for the children of the wealthy.

In 1783 he joined the Society of Gwyneddigion, and soon began compiling his Welsh-English dictionary.

In 1806, he inherited the estates of Rice Pughe, of Nantglyn, Denbighshire, a distant relative. It was in gratitude to his cousin and benefactor that he added the name "Pughe" to his birth-name. After this he enjoyed a private income which meant that he was able to devote his whole time to literary and scholarly pursuits. He remained in London after 1815, when his wife died, but with his health declining he returned to live in Wales in 1825. He died ten years later in a friend's cottage beside Tal-y-llyn Lake.

== Personal ==
In 1790 Pughe married Sarah Elizabeth Harper. The marriage produced two recorded daughters and one son, the noted scholar Aneurin Owen.

== Works ==
- A Dictionary of the Welsh Language, Explained in English (1803)
- The Cambrian Biography: Or, Historical Notices of Celebrated Men Among the Ancient Britons (1803)
- Coll Gwynfa (translation of Paradise Lost) (1819)
- Hu Gadarn (1822)
- A Dictionary of the Welsh Language explained in English (1832)

For Rees's Cyclopædia he wrote about history, but the topics are not known.
