= Llywelyn Siôn =

Early modern Welsh poet and bard

Llywelyn Siôn (1540 – c. 1615) was a Welsh language poet and bard and the "greatest professional copyist of his time".

== Life ==
Born to unknown parents at Llangewydd in Glamorgan, Llywelyn Siôn was instructed by Meurig Dafydd, Thomas Llewelyn and possibly the priest Morgan Powell. From there, he played an "active role in cintemporary Catholic life" as a poet and copyist, although the quality of his poetry is considered inferior to earlier Glamorgan poetry; as a copyist however, he is described as the "foremost" of Welsh scribes of his age. Around 1575, he is mentioned under the name Lewelyn John by Sir Edward Mansel in his History of the Norman Conquest of Glamorgan, as a learned and diligent collector of Welsh manuscripts. Following in Meurig Dafydd's footsteps, Siôn became (in 1580) president of the 'Gorsedd' or bardic congress of Glamorgan. He presided at the Glamorgan gorsedd at Tir Iarll in 1580, and was commissioned to collect and publish and traditional lore of the bardic order.

Between 1587 and 1593, he was summoned before court several times, on accusation of being a recusant.

== Works ==
Thirteen of his handwritten manuscripts survive to date. They preserve works of Glamorgan-based poets, but also of other parts of Wales. His writing also provides the largest surviving collection of carols, but also cywyddau, awdlau and other poetry. His prose books are also of scholarly importance: His translation of the Gesta Romanorum is the only Welsh copy; His transcription of Gruffydd Robert's Drych Cristnogawl is the only complete copy; The Seven Wise Men of Rome (welsh: Chwedl Seith Doethon Rufain) differs significantly from other surviving versions.

As a copyist, he is merited with preserving medieval and sixteenth-century literary heritage, which gained him the reputation of being a "principal shaper[...] of Iolo's mythical Glamorgan."
