= Gorsedd Cymru =

Society of Welsh language

- Awen Bardic symbol
- Abbreviation: the Gorsedd
- Formation: Ancient; 540 (1st Eisteddfod); 1792 (revived)
- Type: Welsh culture Celtic Revival
- Headquarters: Wales
- Archdruid: Mererid Hopwood
- Cofiadur (Secretary): Christine James
- Arwyddfardd (Herald Bard): Beti-Wyn James
- Ceidwad y Cledd (Sword-bearer): Robin o Fôn
- Website: gorsedd.cymru

Gorsedd Cymru (Welsh pronunciation: [ˈɡɔrsɛð ˈkəmrɨ, -ri]), or simply the Gorsedd (Welsh: yr Orsedd), is a society of Welsh-language poets, writers, musicians and others who have contributed to the Welsh language and to public life in Wales. Its aim is to honour such individuals and help develop and promote their fields in addition to maintaining relationships with other Celtic nations and Y Wladfa in Patagonia. The Gorsedd is most prominent at the National Eisteddfod of Wales where it is responsible for the main ceremonies held.

== Name ==
The word gorsedd (plural gorseddau) means 'throne' in Welsh. Equivalent terms exist in Cornish, as gorsedh, and in Breton, as goursez. When the term is used without qualification, it generally refers to the national Gorsedd of Wales, namely Gorsedd Cymru. Note that when referred to as simply "the Gorsedd" in Welsh, the initial g is dropped due to soft mutation, resulting in yr Orsedd. Other gorseddau exist outside Wales, such as the Cornish Gorsedh Kernow and the Breton Goursez Vreizh.

Until 2019, Gorsedd Cymru was known as Gorsedd Beirdd Ynys Prydain (Welsh for 'the Gorsedd of the bards of the island of Britain') or Gorsedd y Beirdd ('the Gorsedd of the bards') for short. At the chairing ceremony of 2019 National Eisteddfod, Archdruid Myrddin ap Dafydd announced that the society was to change its name to Gorsedd Cymru (Welsh for 'the Gorsedd of Wales'). This was deemed more "suitable for the modern Wales" and less "misleading" as the Gorsedd consists of more than just bards. The name change was approved by the Board of the Gorsedd, the Gorsedd membership and the Court of the National Eisteddfod. In spite of this, some felt unhappy with the decision, with academic Simon Brooks declaring that "227 years of history are in the balance", calling for a public enquiry into the change.

== History ==
According to the Introduction of the Transactions of the Royal National Eisteddfod of Wales, Liverpool, 1884:

"The records thus furnished, take us back to a time of Prydain ab Aedd Mawr, who is said to have lived about a thousand years before the Christian era, and who established the Gorsedd as an institution to perpetuate the works of the poets and musicians. But the first Eisteddfod, properly so called, appears to have been held at Conway in the year 540, under the authority and control of Maelgwn Gwynedd. This was followed by a series of meetings held at varying intervals under the auspices of the Welsh Princes, among whom Bleddyn ab Cynfyn and Gruffydd ab Cynan were prominent as patrons and organizers; and the granting of Royal Charters by Edward IV for the holding of an Eisteddfod at Carmarthen in 1451, and by Queen Elizabeth for a similar festival at Caerwys in 1568."

The Gorsedd was revived as Gorsedd Beirdd Ynys Prydain in 1792 by Edward Williams commonly known as Iolo Morganwg, supposedly based on the activities of the ancient Celtic Druidry. Nowadays, much of its ritual has Christian influence, and was given further embellishment in the 1930s by Archdruid Cynan (Albert Evans-Jones, 1950–1954 and 1963–1966). The Gorsedd made its first appearance at the Eisteddfod at the Ivy Bush Inn in Carmarthen in 1819, and its close association with the festival has continued since then.

The fictitious origin of these ceremonies was established by Professor G.J. Williams in works touching on Iolo Morganwg.

== Ranks ==
There are three ranks of membership in the Gorsedd. Until 2012 they were, in ascending order of honour:

- Ovates, who wear green robes (Green signifying a verdant spring)
- Bards, who wear blue robes, and (Blue signifying the season)
- Druids, who wear white robes. (White signifying old age and sanctity)

Since the 1960s the saturation of the robes (primarily the green and blue) became more artificial in appearance, although it is not known why this shift occurred.

However, since 2012 all these ranks are treated as equal, with new members all being called 'druids' and with the colour of their robes reflecting the area of their contribution rather than an ascending order of honour. The head of a Gorsedd is known as an Archdderwydd (English: Archdruid), and wears a golden robe, and is elected for a term of three years, and is responsible for conducting the Gorsedd ceremonies during Eisteddfod week. These ceremonies are held to honour literary achievements amongst Welsh poets and prose writers.

== Admission ==
In the Welsh Gorsedd, a person may become an ovate or a bard by passing an examination in the Welsh language. Druids may only be nominated by existing druids. Often a new inductee will take a pseudonym, called a "bardic name". To become an Archdruid, an individual must have won one of the Eisteddfod's three highest awards: the Crown, the Chair, or the Literature Medal. In 2003, Robyn Léwis (Robyn Llŷn) became the first winner of the Literature Medal to be elected Archdruid, and the first Archdruid to be elected by a vote of all Gorseddogion. Christine James was the first woman to become Archdruid of Wales and also the first woman to become Cofiadur (Recorder) of the Gorsedd.

People are also made ovates or druids as an honour to reward their contributions to Welsh culture. In 1946, the future Queen Elizabeth II was inducted into the Welsh Gorsedd at the National Eisteddfod of Wales with the bardic name Elizabeth o Windsor, though in 2019 Archdruid Myrddin ap Dafydd declared that the Queen was now ineligible because she does not speak Welsh (since in 2006 "it was made clear you had to speak Welsh to be a member"). In recent years, Ron Davies, Rowan Williams, Matthew Rhys, Ioan Gruffudd, Rebecca Evans, Mark Drakeford, and Rhun ap Iorwerth have been honoured in this way.

== Ceremonies ==
The Gorsedd holds multiple ceremonies during the week of the National Eisteddfod, as well as an announcement ceremony a year before the Eisteddfod will be held in the area. They usually hold an opening an closing ceremony at the beginning and end of the week are held outside around "Cylch yr Orsedd" (the Circle of the Gorsedd) a circle of standing stone outdoors with a central logan stone where the Archdruid leads the ceremony on the Eisteddfod site, the announcement ceremony is also held at a Cylch yr Orsedd. If the weather is unconducive to holding the ceremony outside, they will then be held inside in the main pavilion of the Eisteddfod. The three awarding ceremonies which are always held inside the pavilion are:

- The Crowning (Coroni) of the Bard (awarded to the poet judged best in the competitions in free meter)
- The Awarding of the Prose Medal (for the winner of the Prose competitions)
- The Chairing (Cadeirio) of the Bard (for the best long poem in traditional strict metre).

During these ceremonies, the Archdruid and the members of the Gorsedd gather on the Eisteddfod stage in their ceremonial robes. When the Archdruid reveals the identity of the winning poet, the Corn Gwlad (lit. trumpet of the country) calls the people together symbolically from the four corners of the country by playing the fanfare four times in different directions, and then the Gorsedd Prayer is chanted. The Archdruid partially then withdraws a sword from its sheath three times, and cries "Y gwir yn erbyn y byd!" ("Truth against the world!"), "Calon wrth galon!" ("Heart to heart!"), "Gwaedd uwch adwaedd!" ("A cry above all cries!"), and then repeats "A oes heddwch?" ("Is there peace?") after each line, to which the assembly reply "Heddwch" ("Peace") each time. The sword is then placed fully back into its sheath, and hence is never drawn fully. Then the Corn Gwlad is presented to the Archdruid by a young local married woman, and the Archdruid is urged to drink the 'wine of welcome'. Then Dawns y Flodau (Dance of the flowers) is performed by a group of local children (before 2020 only girls) between the ages of 7 and 12 based on a pattern of flower gathering from the fields, and a young girl then presents a basket of 'flowers from the land and soil of Wales' to the Archdruid.

== Symbols ==
Symbol of the Gorsedd

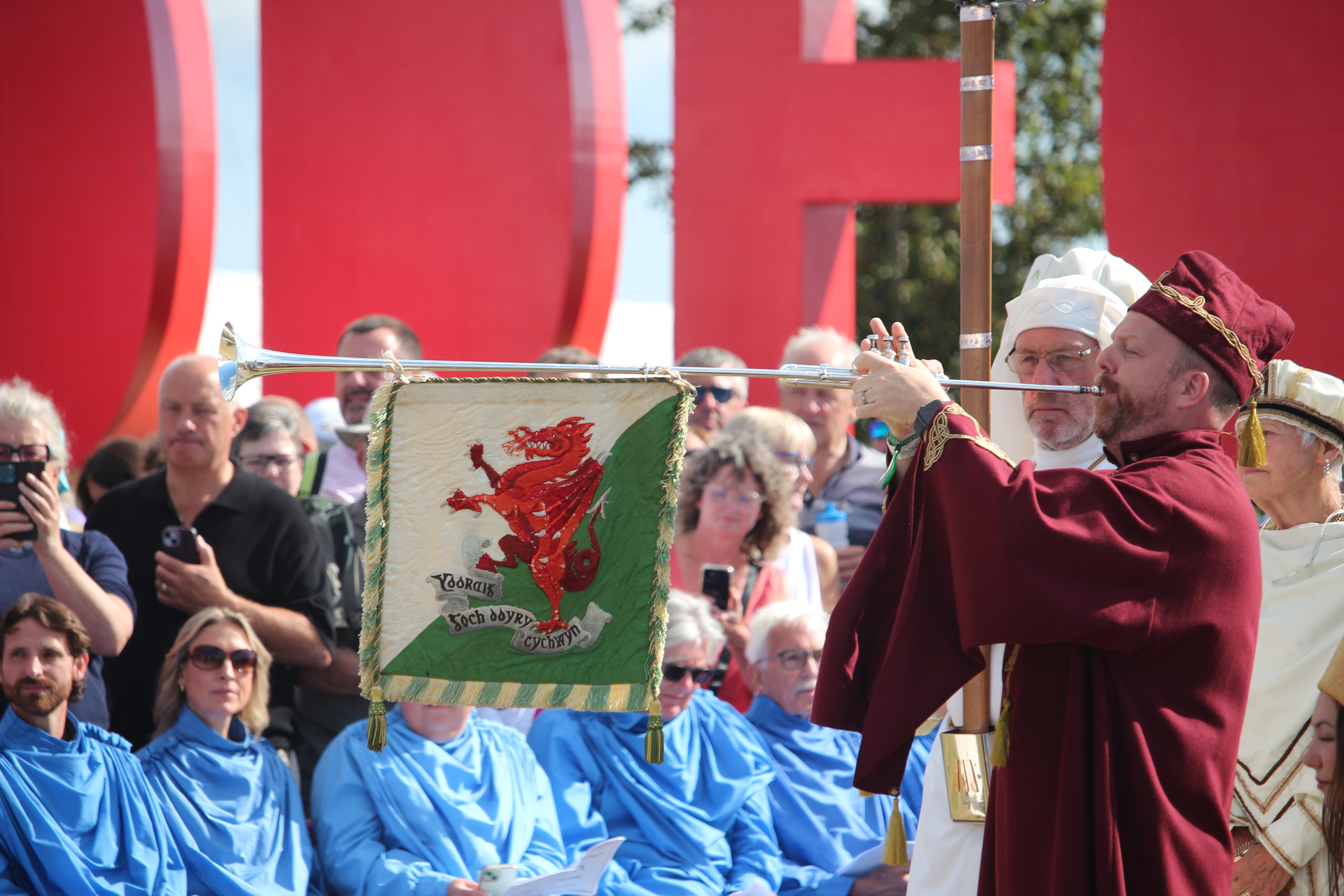
Y Corn Gwlad

The symbol commonly used to represent a Gorsedd is a triple line, the middle line upright and the outer two slanted towards the top of the centre, thus: /|\. This symbol has many names: "Nod Cyfrin" ("Mystic Mark"), "Nod Peledr Goleni" ("Mark of the Ray"), or "awen" ("muse" or "inspiration"). The symbol was created by Iolo Morgannwg and represents rays of lights, with the three rays representing the virtues Love, Justice, and Truth. It was first seen on the Proclamation Scroll in Cardiff, 1833. By 1850 it could be seen on the banners in gorseddau and from around 1860 on new members' certificates. By the end of the century it was considered the approved symbol of the Gorsedd of the Bards and appeared on its programmes, on the new banner and sometimes even on the Gorsedd Stones. By the 1950s it was decided that the symbol had to be included on every national Chair and Crown.

=== Y Corn Gwlad ===
Y Corn Gwlad (lit. the trumpet of the country) is used at the beginning of each ceremony. There are two Corn Gwlad, and two trumpeters to play the fanfare. They are silver trumpets with banners connected to them which show a green and white background, and on the inside there's a golden symbol of the Gorsedd, and on the outside an image of the red dragon with the words "Y ddraig goch ddyry cychwyn" ("The red dragon gives cause to start"). The current pair of trumpets were previously used at Elizabeth II's Coronation ceremony (1953) and were donated through the former-Herald Bard (Sieffre o Gyfarthfa)'s Memorial Fund, and the pendant banners on them were embroidered by Miss Iles, Brynsiencyn. In 1947 Haydn Morris (Bardic name: Haydn Bencerdd) composed the modern fanfare for the different ceremonies.

=== Corn Hirlas ===
Corn Hirlas (lit. long blue horn) previously known as Corn Buelyn (the Aurochs Horn) is presented to the Archdruid during the ceremonies who is asked to symbolically drink from it. It is carried by the presenter of the horn who is called "Mam y Fro" ("Mother of the Valley") and is a young mother from the area of the Eisteddfod, since 2020 men have also been eligable for the role, although none have been so far. The Corn Hirlas was made by W. Goscombe John for Lord Tredegar, who presented it to the Archdruid Hwfa Môn (Rowland Williams) in Cardiff in 1899.

=== Y Cleddyf Mawr ===
Y Cleddyf Mawr (The Grand Sword) is an ornate sword which is kept sheathed. It is used during the ceremonies where it is partly unsheathed and cries of "peace" are called. Iolo Morgannwg, a pacifist, in the first Eisteddfod in 1792 originally started with a naked sword in the middle of the Gorsedd which was sheathed to symbolise peace in the event. The rite of calling out for "peace" was originally separate and started in 1867. The current sword was made in 1899 by Professor Hubert Herkomer with engraved symbolism: the natural crystal in the hilt represents mysticism; the three sacred lines represent the first attempt to write 'Jehovah'; the dragon guards them both. On the scabbard the following mottoes are inscribed:

- "Y Gwir yn erbyn y Byd" (The Truth against the World) (motto of the Gorsedd of the Isle of Britain)
- "Duw a phob Daioni" (God and all Goodness) (the Chair of Glamorgan and Gwent)
- "Calon wrth Galon" (Heart to Heart) (the Chair of Dyfed)
- "A Laddo a Leddir" ( He who Kills shall be Killed) (the Chair of Powys)
- "Iesu na ad gamwaith" (Jesus, let there be no injustice) (the Chair of Gwynedd)

=== Baner yr Orsedd ===
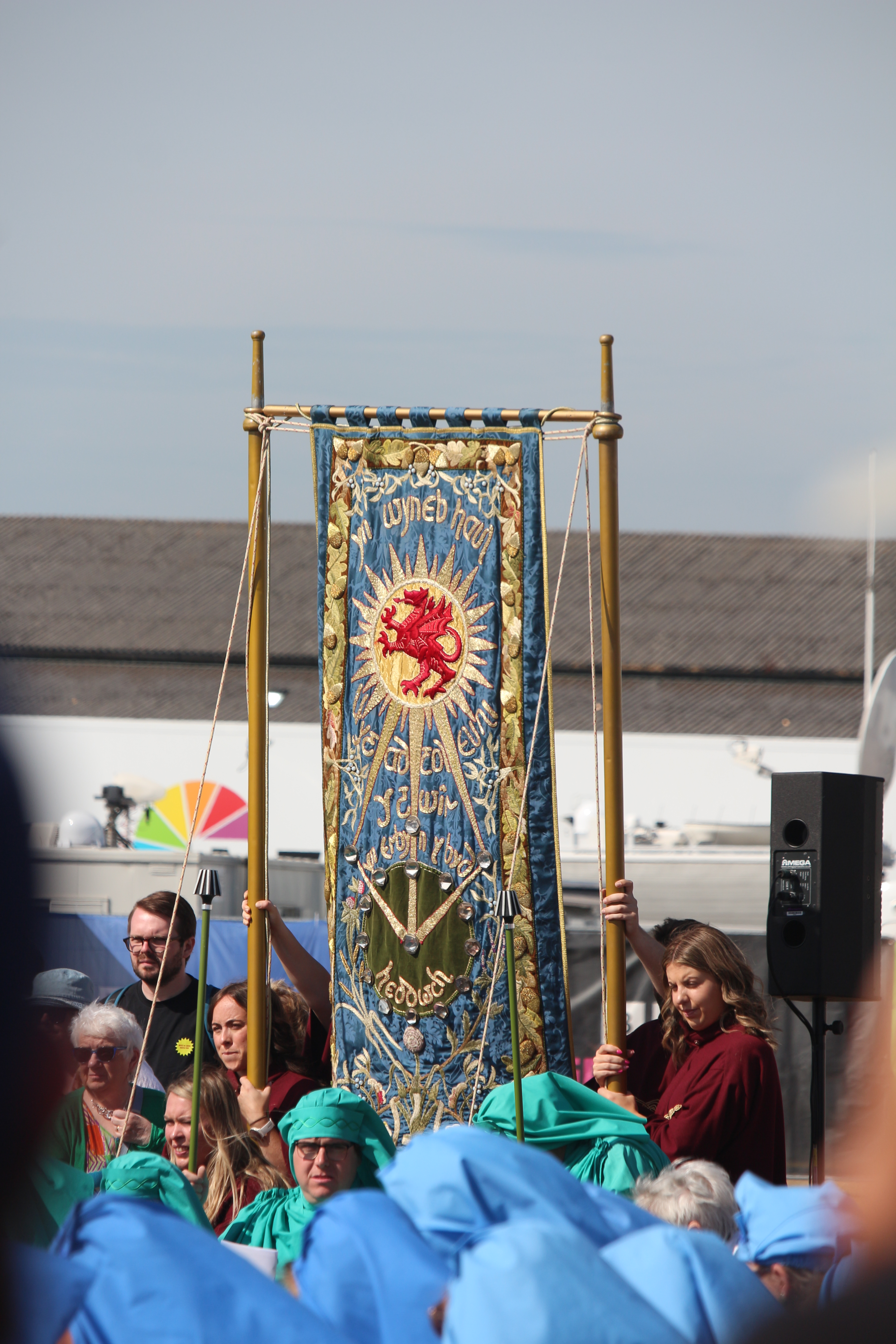
The banner in 2026

A banner seems to have been a common feature in Gorsedd ceremonies, since at least 1889, although they may have been simple banners in the past. The first official banner, however, was designed by T.H.Thomas, Arlunydd Pen-y-garn, the Herald Bard, for the Llandudno Gorsedd in 1896. The banner is very ornate with many symbols representing Wales and the Gorsedd as well as many mottoes. It was originally embroidered by Miss Lena Evans (Brodes Dâr) and donated by Sir Arthur Stepney, Llanelli. It has been refurbished several times but remains faithful to the original design. During ceremonies it is held aloft behind the Archdruid.

== See also ==
- Archdruid (includes a chronological list of Archdruids of Wales)
- Gorsedd stones, groups of standing stones constructed for the National Eisteddfod
- List of Celtic festivals
  - Oireachtas na Gaeilge (Irish festival founded 1899)
  - Mòd (Scottish Gaelic festivals)
