= Bardic name =

Pseudonym used by poets/artists in Wales, Cornwall or Brittany

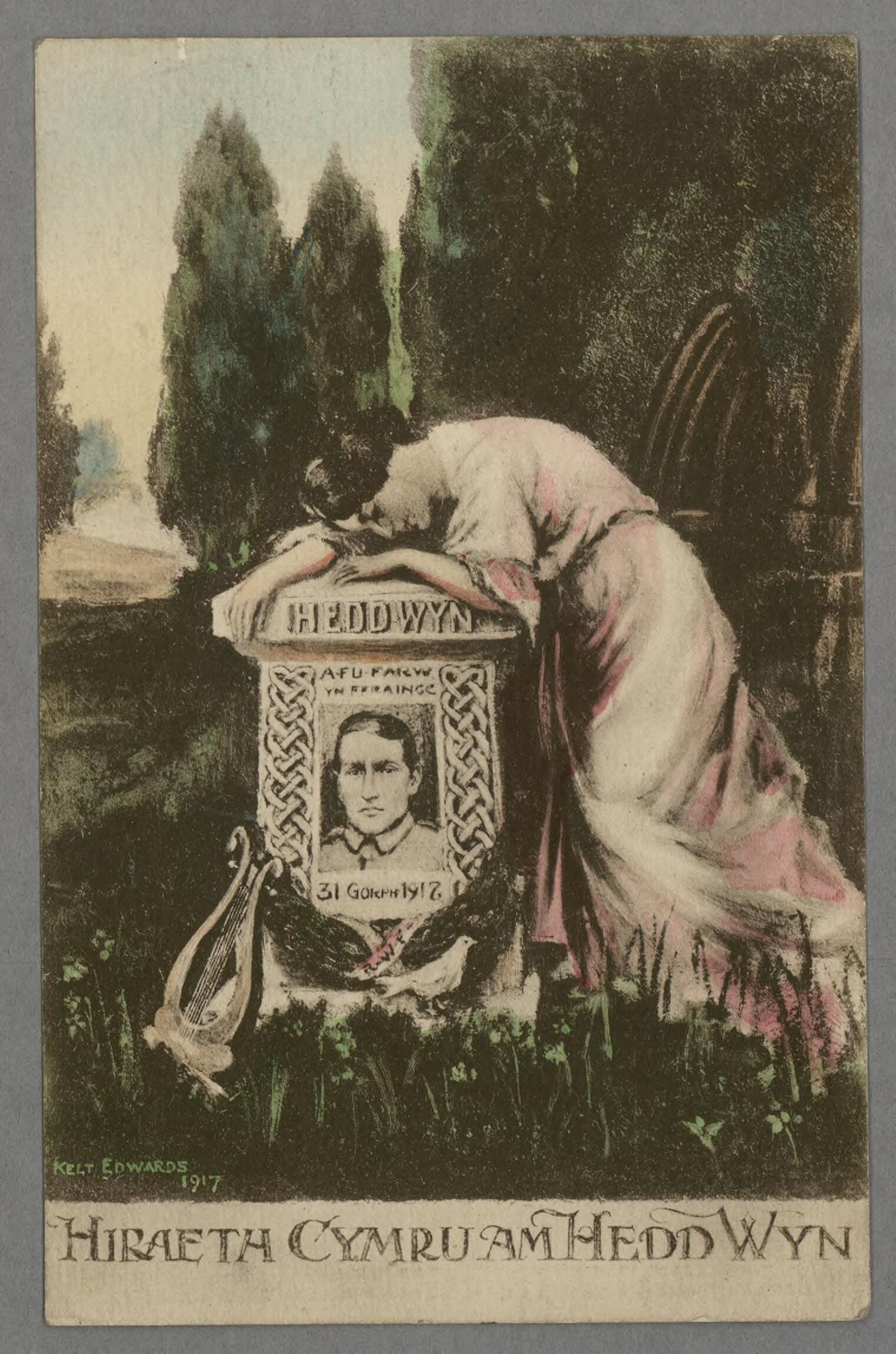
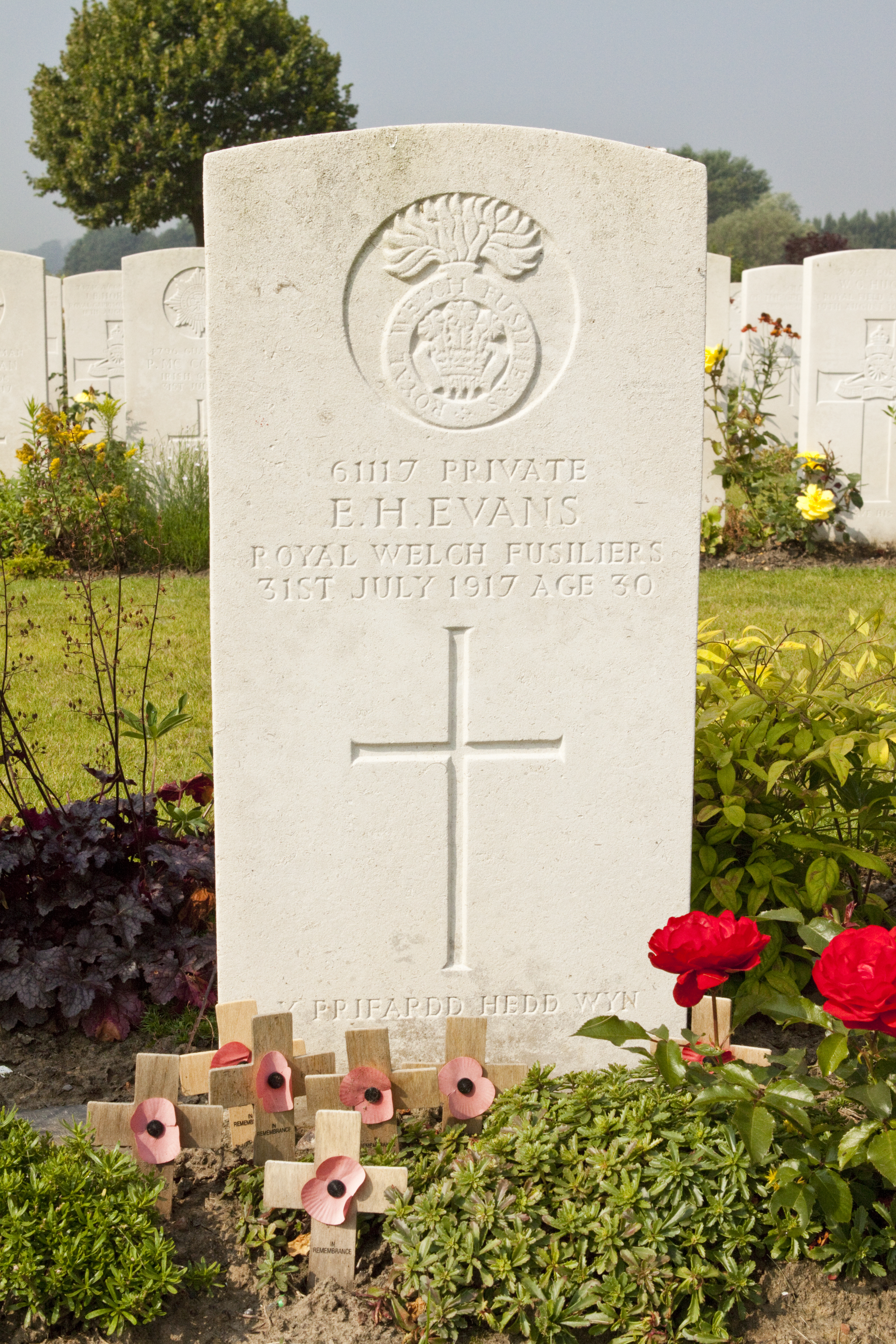
The war poet, Ellis Humphrey Evans was eulogised by his Bardic name Hedd Wyn (English: Blessed Peace). However, his grave at Artillery Wood Cemetery names him as E.H. Evans.

A bardic name (Welsh: enw barddol, Cornish: hanow bardhek, Breton: anv ur barzh) is a pseudonym used by poets and other artists in the Brythonic cultures of Wales, Cornwall and Brittany.

In Wales, it is also associated with the National Eisteddfod, with new members of the Gorsedd assuming a bardic name when being admitted.

== History ==
=== Early Medieval Bards ===
It was common in Medieval Wales for personal names to derive from nicknames rather than hereditary, patronymic or occupational names and there is evidence that Bardic names are even more ancient. The ninth century Historia Brittonum names five bards who were active shortly after the End of Roman rule in Britain; features of modern bardic naming conventions are found in all five names.

Talhaearn Tad Awen, (English: The Father of Awen) and Cian Guenith Guaut (English: Cian of the wheat-harvest of song) are given explicitly bardic names, while Blwchfardd appears to be named as a bard, with the element fardd, the lenition of the plural form. The fourth, Aneurin Gwawdrydd (English: Aneurin of the flowing verse) or Aneurin Gwenithwawd (English: Aneurin of the Corn Poetry), acquired his poetic sobriquet at some point in the early history of Medieval Welsh literature. The final bard was given the patronymic name Gwion Bach ap Gwreang at birth, but was named Taliesin (English: Radiant Brow) by his first patron Elffin ap Gwyddno.

=== Court Bards ===
These earliest bards were followed by the period of Yr Hengerdd (English: The old poetry) which lasted until the Norman invasion of Wales. The next period, Beirdd y Tywysogion (English: Bards of the Princes) lasted until the fourteenth century and saw the rise of a professional class of Bards who enjoyed formal education in bardic schools, found employment in the numerous princely courts around Wales and were even members of a "Guild of poets" with rights and responsibilities enshrined in ancient Welsh law. These poets continued to use Bardic names such as Cynddelw Brydydd Mawr (English: Cynddelw the Master Poet) and Iolo Goch (English: Iolo the Red).

=== Continued usage ===
Welsh culture experienced great challenges following the Glyndŵr rebellion. The 1401 and 1402 Penal laws against the Welsh acts were continually reaffirmed throughout the fifteenth century, before being replaced by the Laws in Wales Acts 1535 and 1542 when Wales was effectively annexed into the Kingdom of England. The laws had a substantial impact on Bardic culture, reducing opportunities for bardic patronage. Traditional Bardic patrons were steadily replaced with an English-speaking gentry, who had little regard for Welsh poetry. Despite these hardships however, the tradition of Bardic Names continued, with itinerant Bards (Welsh: Y Glêr) such as Guto'r Glyn noted as some of the greatest poets of the era.

=== Revival ===
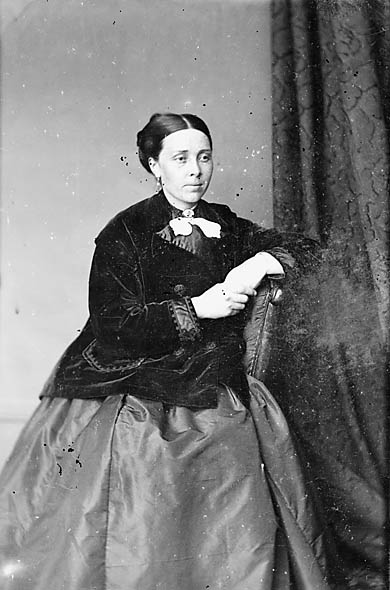
The nineteenth century poet, Sarah Jane Rees adopted the Bardic name Cranogwen

By the seventeenth and eighteenth centuries, traditional Welsh names had given way to modern Welsh surnames. These surnames retained Welsh patronymic conventions, using a small number of historical or biblical Christian names with the element ap (meaning "son of" and cognate with the Gaelic "Mac") leading to names like Powell (from ap Hywel), Price (from ap Rhys) and Bowen (from ab Owen). Or with the addition of an "-s" termination to the father's name, as in Jones (from John), Davies (from David) and Williams (from William).

As Wales industrialised and the population of formerly rural parishes grew exponentially, it became common practice to refer to an individual by a nickname often derived from their home village or farm, their occupation or a defining personal characteristic. One of the most prominent figures in the resurgence of Bardic names was Edward Williams, who took the name Iolo Morganwg (English: Iolo of Glamorgan) around 1788. Iolo was a great advocate of the Bardic history of Wales and his revival of ancient Welsh customs was a central part of what would become the Eisteddfod movement.

As the Eisteddfod movement increased, and more Welsh language literature was published, many Welsh writers took Bardic Names to distinguish them from others with similar or identical names, but also to identify themselves as a poet, writer or musician. Examples include, John Jones (Talhaiarn) took his bardic name from his place of origin, to distinguish him from contemporaries with the name John Jones. The minister Joseph Harris (Gomer) selected his bardic name from the Bible. Others, such as Hedd Wyn, used poetic inventions.

=== Modern Bardic names ===
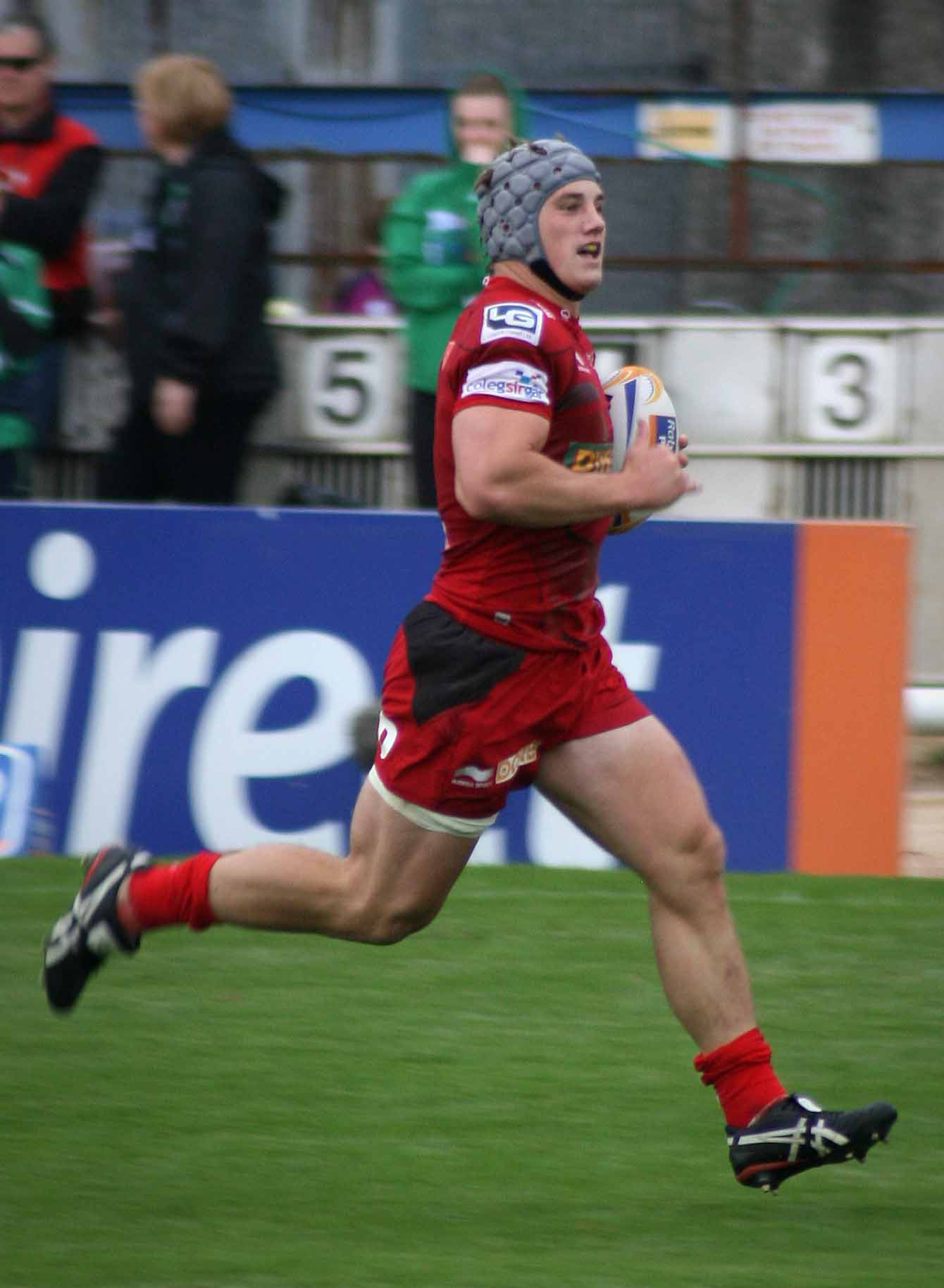
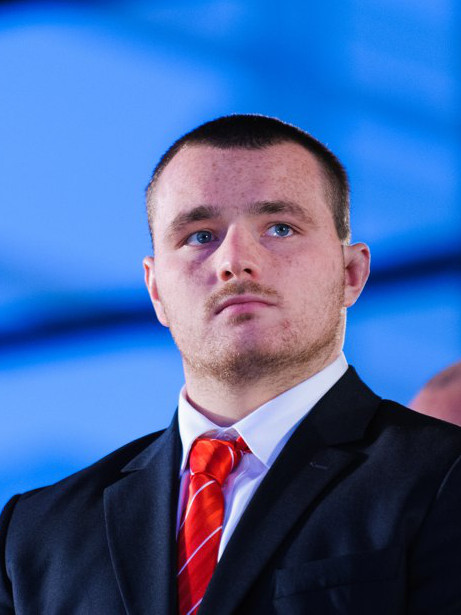
Rugby players Jonathan Davies and Ken Owens chose to adapt their own nicknames when they were inducted into the Gorsedd of Bards at the 2019 National Eisteddfod in Llanrwst. Davies chose the Bardic name "Jon Cadno" (English: Jon Fox) and Owens the name "Ken y Siryf" (English: Ken the Sherriff).

Today, a Bardic name can be a pen name but it could also be an accolade, such as the Bardic names given in the context of an eisteddfod. This is particularly true of the National Eisteddfod and the Gorsedd of Bards, where Bardic names are commonly adopted when being inducted into the Orders of distinguished bards and writers.

The sobriquet could be:

- added to the surname, as in William Williams Pantycelyn – as a suffixed accolade.
- as a replacement of the original surname, as in: William Pantycelyn – often to preserve a distinction between the literary persona and the private persona.
- stand alone, as in: Pantycelyn – without further elaboration, sometimes better known than the Bard's birth name.

== In Brittany and Cornwall ==
The usage has also extended to Breton and Cornish poetry. In Cornwall, some of the pioneers of the Cornish language movement are referred to by their bardic names, e.g., "Mordon" for Robert Morton Nance, and "Talek" for E. G. Retallack Hooper.

== See also ==
- Gorsedd
- Gorseth Kernow
- List of Welsh-language poets (6th century to c. 1600)
- Eisteddfod
- Welsh poetry
