= James Murray (British politician, born 1887) =

British coal miner and Labour Party politician

Member of Parliament for North West Durham Spennymoor (1942–1950)
- In office 21 July 1942 – 1955
- Preceded by: Joseph Batey
- Succeeded by: William Ainsley

Personal details
- Born: 17 September 1887 East Howle, County Durham
- Died: 24 January 1965 (aged 77) Dryburn Hospital, Durham
- Children: 3
- Occupation: Coal miner; Miners' Union Official; Methodist Minister

James Dixon Murray (17 September 1887 – 24 January 1965) was a British coal miner, Miners' Union Official, Labour Party politician, and Methodist Minister. He was a Member of Parliament (MP) for North West Durham, formerly Spennymoor, from 1942–1955, winning a by-election in Spennymoor in 1942 to resigning from Parliament before the 1955 general election.

== Early life and education ==
Murray was born in East Howle, County Durham, on 17 September 1887 to William Murray and Amelia Murray (née Dixon). He was from a family of twelve and was brought up in a three-roomed miner's cottage at 27, Front Street, Browney Colliery. He began work at a Durham pit aged thirteen, and was hewing coal by the time he was sixteen years old. He had a primary education at East Howle Elementary school, but was anxious to improve himself, went to evening classes and twice won WEA (Workers' Educational Association) university scholarships.

== Early political career (1925–1942) ==
He was a miners' union official, was elected to Durham County Council in 1925, and in 1937 became an Alderman of Durham City.

== Parliamentary career ==
He was elected unopposed as the Member of Parliament for Spennymoor at a by-election in July 1942, following the resignation of the Labour MP Joseph Batey due to ill health. He retained the seat at the 1945 general election, and when the Spennymoor constituency was abolished for the 1950 general election, he was returned as MP for the new North West Durham constituency. On 22 June 1948 in a letter to the Prime Minister Clement Attlee James Murray was one of eleven MPs who raised concerns that an "argosy of Jamaicans", such as on board the HMT Empire Windrush, could "cause discord and unhappiness among all concerned".

He retired from the House of Commons at the 1955 general election.

=== Maiden speech ===
An urban myth surrounds his maiden speech. It is popularly believed that it took him years to make his maiden speech, finally rising to his feet during World War II to complain about "the shortage of dum-tits at Meadowfield Co-op". In fact he made his maiden speech, entitled "Coal Situation" on 1 October 1942, little over two months after being elected. His speech about the "Soothers" was actually made during the closing months of World War II, almost three years after his entry to Parliament.

=== Parliamentary incidents ===
Murray was publicly reprimanded in the House of Commons on 17 March 1947 by Conservative MP Robert Boothby for eating an orange, as Boothby was allergic to oranges.

== Personal life ==
Prior to his election to Parliament, he ran a shop and lived in a house opposite it at 11 Frederick Street, North Meadowfield until he died. He was an Independent Methodist Minister and President of the Browney Independent Methodist Church in Brandon Lane. When the chapel closed, he founded and opened the new Murray Independent Methodist Church on 11 October 1958 on the new Saw Mills Estate, at Grove Road, Brandon which is locally known as "Jimmy Murray's chapel". He died at Dryburn Hospital, Durham and left an estate valued at £14,769 and was survived by his wife and their three daughters.

Parliament of the United Kingdom
Preceded by Joseph Batey	Member of Parliament for Spennymoor; 1942–1950	Constituency abolished
New constituency	Member of Parliament for North West Durham; 1950–1955	Succeeded by William Ainsley
