= James Murray =

James, Jim, or Jimmy Murray may refer to:

== Arts and entertainment ==
- James Murray (American actor) (1901–1936), American actor
- James Murray (director), director of films and programs such as The National Dream
- James Murray (English actor) (born 1975), English actor born in Manchester
- James Murray (puppeteer), American actor and puppeteer
- James Murray (comedian) (born 1976), American comedian, television star and member of The Tenderloins
- James Murray (speed painter), British speed painter
- James Ramsey Murray (1841–1905), American composer of "Away in a Manger"
- Jim Murray (musician) (1942–2013), San Francisco musician of the 1960s
- Jim Murray (sportswriter) (1919–1998), American sportswriter
- Jim Murray (whisky writer) (born 1957), English whisky writer
- James Murray, half of photographer duo James and Karla Murray

== Military ==
- James Murray (naval officer), Scottish shipbuilder in the Polish service, counter-admiral during the Battle of Oliwa (1627)
- James Wolfe Murray (1853–1919), British military officer and chief of the Imperial General Staff in the 1910s
- James Murray (British Army officer, born 1721) (1721–1794), Scottish military officer and governor of Quebec
- James Murray of Strowan (1734–1794), Scottish general of the Seven Years' War and the American Revolution
- James Murray (VC) (1859–1942), Irish recipient of the Victoria Cross during the First Boer War
- James Pulteney (1755–1811), born James Murray, Scottish general and MP for Weycombe and Regis
- James Patrick Murray (British Army officer) (1782–1834), British soldier, MP for Yarmouth 1802–03
- James Lore Murray (1919–2004), USAF major general responsible for the ejection seat and the B-52 aircraft

== Politics ==
=== Australia ===
- James Murray (Australian politician) (1895–1974), Australian politician
- James Fitzgerald Murray (1805–1856), Australian politician

=== Canada and Newfoundland ===
- James Alexander Murray (1864–1960), premier of New Brunswick for a part of 1917
- James Murray (Newfoundland politician) (1843–1900), Newfoundland politician

=== United Kingdom ===
- James Murray of Pardewis (died 1592), Scottish courtier who challenged the Earl of Bothwell
- James Murray (courtier) (died 1613), Scottish diplomat and master of the wardrobe
- James Murray, Lord Philiphaugh (1655–1708), Scottish judge and politician
- Lord James Murray (1663–1719), Member of Parliament for Perthshire
- James Murray, 2nd Duke of Atholl (1690–1764), Whig Member of Parliament and lord of the Isle of Man
- James Murray (Jacobite Earl of Dunbar) (1690–1770), Scottish Member of Parliament, later Jacobite Secretary of State
- James Murray (Scottish politician, 1727–1799), Scottish landowner, entrepreneur, and politician from Broughton and Cally, Member of Parliament
- James Murray (Liberal politician) (1850–1933), Liberal Member of Parliament for Aberdeenshire Eastern
- James Murray, 1st Baron Glenlyon (1782–1837), British Army officer and Member of Parliament
- James Murray (British politician, born 1887) (1887–1965), Member of Parliament
- James Murray (British politician, born 1983), Secretary of State for Health and Social Care in 2026

=== United States ===
- James Murray (Ohio politician) (1830–1881), attorney general of Ohio
- James B. Murray (1920–2015), member of the Virginia House of Delegates
- James C. Murray (1917–1999), United States representative from Illinois
- James E. Murray (1876–1961), United States senator from Montana

== Sports ==
=== Association football ===
- Jamie Murray (footballer) (born 1958), Scottish football fullback with Cambridge United and Brentford in the 1970s and 1980s
- Jimmy Murray (English footballer) (1935–2008), English football striker with Wolves, Manchester City and Walsall in the 1950s and 1960s
- Jimmy Murray (footballer, born 1880) (1880–1933), Scottish footballer who played in the early 20th century
- Jimmy Murray (footballer, born 1884) (1884–?), Northern Irish footballer
- Jimmy Murray (footballer, born 1933) (1933–2015), Scottish footballer who played for Heart of Midlothian and the Scotland national team

=== American football ===
- Jim Murray (American football) (1938–2025), American football executive
- Jimmy Murray (American football) (born 1995), American football player

=== Baseball ===
- Jim Murray (pitcher) (1894–1973), US baseball player for Brooklyn Robins
- Jim Murray (outfielder) (1878–1945), Major League Baseball outfielder, 1902–1914

=== Ice hockey ===
- Jim "Bearcat" Murray (1933–2022), Canadian ice hockey trainer
- Jim Murray (ice hockey) (born 1943), Canadian ice hockey player

=== Other sports ===
- James Murray (boxer) (1969–1995), Scottish professional boxer who died from injuries sustained in a boxing fight
- James Murray (hurler) (born 1978), Irish hurler who plays with Waterford GAA
- Jamie Murray (born 1986), Scottish tennis player, specialist doubles player
- James Murray (luger) (born 1946), American Olympic luger
- Jimmy Murray (Gaelic footballer) (1917–2007), Roscommon All-Ireland winning Gaelic football captain of the 1940s
- Jim Murray (sportswriter) (1919–1998), American sportswriter
- James Wolfe Murray (cricketer) (1936–2011), Scottish cricketer

== Science and medicine ==
- James Murray (biologist) (1865–?), Scottish biologist and explorer
- James Murray (lichenologist) (1923–1961), organic chemist and first modern lichenologist in New Zealand
- James Murray (physician) (1788–1871), Irish physician and creator of the medication known as milk of magnesia
- James A. Murray (zoologist) (fl. 1880s), zoologist and museum curator in Karachi
- James D. Murray (born 1931), mathematics professor

== Religion ==
- James Murray (historian) (1732–1782), Church of Scotland minister, religious author and historian
- James Murray (bishop of Maitland) (1828–1909), Roman Catholic bishop, the first Bishop of Maitland, New South Wales, Australia
- James Murray (vicar apostolic of Cooktown) (1847–1914), Roman Catholic bishop in Cooktown, Queensland, Australia
- James Albert Murray (1932–2020), American Roman Catholic bishop

== Other fields ==
- James Murray (architect) (died 1634), Scottish architect
- James Murray (lexicographer) (1837–1915), Scottish lexicographer and editor of the Oxford English Dictionary
- James Murray (loyalist) (1713–1781), loyalist in North Carolina and Boston prior to the American Revolution
- James Murray, 2nd Earl of Annandale (died 1658), an Earl of Annandale
- Several Murray baronets, in the Baronetage of Nova Scotia
- James Boyles Murray (1789–1866), businessman in New York
- James Erskine Murray (1810–1844), lawyer, author, and adventurer in Borneo
- James M. Murray (fl. 1990s–2020s), director of the U.S. Secret Service
- James Wolfe Murray, Lord Cringletie (1759–1836), Scottish lawyer
- Jim Murray (trade unionist) (died 2006), British trade union leader
- Jim Murray, co-founder and CEO of Feastables chocolate and snack brand

== See also ==
- Jamie Murray (born 1986), Scottish tennis player
