= 1915 Mid Durham by-election =

1915 UK parliamentary by-election

The 1915 Mid Durham by-election was a Parliamentary by-election held on 29 April 1915. The constituency returned one Member of Parliament (MP) to the House of Commons of the United Kingdom, elected by the first past the post voting system.

== Vacancy ==
John Wilson, who had been the Liberal MP since 1890 died on the 24 March 1915 at the age of 78. Wilson was sponsored by the Durham Miners Association, an organisation that he had helped to found. When the Miners Federation of Great Britain decided in 1909 to request all miners sponsored MPs to take the Labour Party whip, Wilson with the support of the Durham miners, refused and continued to take the Liberal whip. The Labour Party was unwilling to go against the Durham miners wishes, and allowed Wilson to continue to represent Mid Durham.

== Electoral history ==
John Wilson

General election December 1910: Mid Durham Electorate 15,832
Party	Candidate	Votes	%	±%
Liberal	John Wilson	Unopposed	N/A	N/A
Liberal hold				

== Candidates ==
The new Liberal candidate selected was Samuel Galbraith, who was one of the leading figures in the Durham Miners Association. The Labour party had hoped that following the death of Wilson, they would be able to either get a leading Durham miner to stand, such as Joseph Batey as their candidate or get a socialist to stand. However, once the Durham Miners decided to back the Liberal Galbraith, a Labour candidate did not materialise. The Unionists, who had not contested the seat for some time also decided not to contest the election. The fact that Britain was now at war also contributed to the Unionist and Labour parties not contesting the seat.

== Result ==
By-Election 29 April 1915: Electorate 17,486
Party	Candidate	Votes	%	±%
Liberal	Samuel Galbraith	Unopposed	N/A	N/A
Liberal hold				

== Aftermath ==
The Mid Durham constituency was abolished and replaced by Spennymoor for the 1918 general election. At that election, Galbraith was again returned, defeating Labour's Joseph Batey.
