= Mid Durham =

Parliamentary constituency in the United Kingdom, 1885–1918

- Former county constituency for the House of Commons

1885–1918
- Seats: one
- Created from: North Durham and South Durham
- Replaced by: Chester-le-Street, Durham, Spennymoor and Sedgefield

Mid Durham was a county constituency represented in the House of Commons of the Parliament of the United Kingdom. It elected one Member of Parliament (MP) by the first past the post system of election from 1885 to 1918.

== History ==
=== Creation ===
The constituency was created by the Redistribution of Seats Act 1885, when the North Durham and South Durham county divisions were replaced by eight new single-member county constituencies. These were Barnard Castle, Bishop Auckland, Chester-le-Street, Houghton-le-Spring, Jarrow, Mid Durham, North West Durham and South East Durham. In addition there were seven County Durham borough constituencies.

=== Boundaries ===
The Sessional Division of Durham and Willington (including all the parish of Shadforth and excluding all the parish of Moorhouse) and the Municipal Borough of Durham.

See map on Vision of Britain website.

NB: 1) Boundary Commission proposed name was "Brancepeth"

2) Included only non-resident freeholders in the parliamentary borough of Durham

=== Abolition ===
The seat was abolished for the 1918 general election, when its contents were distributed as follows:

- Parish of Witton Gilbert to Chester-le-Street;
- Remaining northern areas, including Brandon and Willington, to the newly created county division of Durham, which also absorbed the abolished parliamentary borough;
- South-western areas, including Brandon and Willington, to the new constituency of Spennymoor; and
- South-eastern areas, including Ferryhill, to the new constituency of Sedgefield.

== Members of Parliament ==
Year	Member	Whip
1885	William Crawford	Liberal
1890	John Wilson	Liberal
1915	Samuel Galbraith	Liberal
1918	constituency abolished	

== Elections ==
=== Elections in the 1880s ===
General election 1885: Mid Durham
Party	Candidate	Votes	%	±%
Lib-Lab	William Crawford	5,799	64.1	
Conservative	Francis Vane-Tempest	3,245	35.9	
Majority		2,554	28.2	
Turnout		9,044	81.1	
Registered electors		11,145		
Lib-Lab win (new seat)				

General election 1886: Mid Durham
Party	Candidate	Votes	%	±%
Lib-Lab	William Crawford	Unopposed		
Lib-Lab hold				

=== Elections in the 1890s ===
Wilson

1890 Mid Durham by-election
Party	Candidate	Votes	%	±%
Lib-Lab	John Wilson	5,469	61.8	N/A
Conservative	Francis Vane-Tempest	3,375	38.2	New
Majority		2,094	23.6	N/A
Turnout		8,844	77.8	N/A
Registered electors		11,362		
Lib-Lab hold				

General election 1892: Mid Durham
Party	Candidate	Votes	%	±%
Lib-Lab	John Wilson	5,661	60.7	N/A
Conservative	Charles Edward Hunter	3,669	39.3	N/A
Majority		1,992	21.4	N/A
Turnout		9,330	79.1	N/A
Registered electors		11,789		
Lib-Lab hold		Swing	N/A	

General election 1895: Mid Durham
Party	Candidate	Votes	%	±%
Lib-Lab	John Wilson	5,937	58.0	−2.7
Conservative	Anthony Wilkinson	4,295	42.0	+2.7
Majority		1,642	16.0	−5.4
Turnout		10,232	81.7	+2.6
Registered electors		12,519		
Lib-Lab hold		Swing	-2.7	

=== Elections in the 1900s ===
General election 1900: Mid Durham
Party	Candidate	Votes	%	±%
Lib-Lab	John Wilson	5,565	57.5	−0.5
Conservative	Charles Edward Hunter	4,105	42.5	+0.5
Majority		1,460	15.0	−1.0
Turnout		9,670	75.5	−6.2
Registered electors		12,816		
Lib-Lab hold		Swing	-0.5	

General election 1906: Mid Durham
Party	Candidate	Votes	%	±%
Lib-Lab	John Wilson	Unopposed		
Lib-Lab hold				

=== Elections in the 1910s ===
Wilson

General election January 1910: Mid Durham
Party	Candidate	Votes	%	±%
Lib-Lab	John Wilson	Unopposed		
Lib-Lab hold				

General election December 1910: Mid Durham
Party	Candidate	Votes	%	±%
Lib-Lab	John Wilson	Unopposed		
Lib-Lab hold				

General Election 1914–15:

Another General Election was required to take place before the end of 1915. The political parties had been making preparations for an election to take place and by July 1914, the following candidates had been selected;

- Liberal: Samuel Galbraith
- Unionist:
- Labour: Joseph Batey

1915 Mid Durham by-election
Party	Candidate	Votes	%	±%
Lib-Lab	Samuel Galbraith	Unopposed		
Lib-Lab hold				

== See also ==
- History of parliamentary constituencies and boundaries in Durham
