= Rights of Man =

Set of essays by Thomas Paine

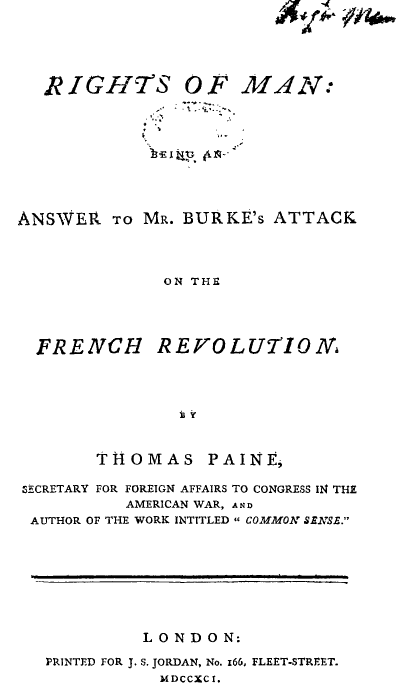
- Title page from the first edition
- Author: Thomas Paine
- Language: English
- Subject: The French Revolution
- Publication date: 1791
- Publication place: Britain
- Text: Rights of Man at Wikisource

Rights of Man is a book by Thomas Paine first published in 1791, including 31 articles, positing that popular political revolution is permissible when a government does not safeguard the natural rights of its people. Using these points as a base, it defends the French Revolution against Edmund Burke's attack in Reflections on the Revolution in France (1790).

It was published in Britain in two parts in March 1791 and February 1792.

== Background ==
Paine was a very strong supporter of the French Revolution that began in 1789; he visited France the following year. Many British thinkers supported it, including Richard Price, who initiated the Revolution Controversy with his sermon and pamphlet drawing favourable parallels between the Glorious Revolution of 1688 and the French Revolution. Conservative intellectual Edmund Burke responded with a counter-revolutionary attack entitled Reflections on the Revolution in France (1790), which strongly appealed to the landed class and sold 30,000 copies. Paine's Rights of Man was printed by London publisher Joseph Johnson for publication on 21 February 1791, then withdrawn for fear of prosecution. J. S. Jordan stepped in and published it on 16 March. The 90,000-word book appeared on 13 March, three weeks later than scheduled. It sold as many as one million copies and was "eagerly read by reformers, Protestant dissenters, democrats, London craftsmen, and the skilled factory-hands of the new industrial north". William Godwin and Thomas Holcroft helped with the publishing of the book; Godwin declared that "the seeds of revolution it contains are so vigorous in their stamina, that nothing can overpower them".

== Arguments ==
Paine argues that the interests of the monarch and his people are united, and insists that the French Revolution should be understood as one which attacks the despotic principles of the French monarchy, not the king himself, and he takes the Bastille, the main prison in Paris, to symbolise the despotism that had been overthrown.

Human rights originate in Nature and are antecedent to law. Any right granted via political charter is inherently legally revocable, which makes it a privilege, not a right:

... It is a perversion of terms to say that a charter gives rights. It operates by a contrary effect—that of taking rights away. Rights are inherently in all the inhabitants; but charters, by annulling those rights, in the majority, leave the right, by exclusion, in the hands of a few ... They ... consequently are instruments of injustice ... The fact, therefore, must be that the individuals, themselves, each, in his own personal and sovereign right, entered into a contract with each other to produce a government: and this is the only mode in which governments have a right to arise, and the only principle on which they have a right to exist.

— Rights of Man, I, London, 1795, pp. 125–126, Rights of Man, II, London, 1795, p. 13.

Government's sole purpose is safeguarding individuals and their inherent, inalienable rights. Any societal institution that does not benefit the nation is illegitimate, especially monarchy and aristocracy. The book's acumen derives from the Age of Enlightenment and has been linked to John Locke's Second Treatise of Government, even though Paine himself claimed to have never read this work.

The fuller development of this position seems to have been worked out one night in France after an evening spent with Thomas Jefferson, and possibly Lafayette, discussing a pamphlet by the Philadelphia conservative James Wilson on the proposed federal constitution.

=== Reformation of the English government ===
Rights of Man concludes in proposing practical reformations of English government such as a written constitution composed by a national assembly, in the American mould; the elimination of aristocratic titles, because democracy is incompatible with primogeniture, which leads to the despotism of the family; a national budget without allotted military and war expenses; lower taxes for the poor, and subsidised education for them; and a progressive income tax weighted against wealthy estates to prevent the re-emergence of a hereditary aristocracy.

== Aristocracy ==
Principally, Rights of Man opposes the idea of hereditary government—the belief that dictatorial government is necessary, because of man's corrupt, essential nature. Although other late-18th-century writers such as James Murray and Major John Cartwright criticized the outsized role played by the aristocracy in the government, Paine was arguably the first to advocate the eradication of titles and hereditary government. In Reflections on the Revolution in France (1790) Edmund Burke says that true social stability arises if the nation's poor majority are governed by a minority of wealthy aristocrats, and that lawful inheritance of power (wealth, religious, governing) ensured the propriety of political power being the exclusive domain of the nation's élite social class—the nobility.

Rights of Man denounces Burke's assertion of the nobility's inherent hereditary wisdom; countering the implication that a nation has not a right to form a Government for governing itself. Paine refutes Burke's definition of Government as "a contrivance of human wisdom". Instead, Paine argues that Government is a contrivance of man, and it follows that hereditary succession and hereditary rights to govern cannot compose a Government—because the wisdom to govern cannot be inherited.

== Heredity ==
Edmund Burke's counter-revolutionary Reflections on the French Revolution delineates the legitimacy of aristocratic government to the 1688 Parliamentary resolution declaring William and Mary of Orange—and their heirs—to be the true rulers of England. Paine puts forward two arguments against this view. Firstly, he argues that "Every age and generation must be as free to act for itself in all cases as the age and generations which preceded it." Secondly, Paine counters that the institution of monarchy should not be historically traced from 1688, but from 1066, when William of Normandy forcibly imposed his Norman rule upon Englishmen.

Thomas Paine's intellectual influence is perceptible in the two great political revolutions of the eighteenth century. He dedicated Rights of Man to George Washington and to the Marquis de Lafayette, acknowledging the importance of the American and the French revolutions.

Thus, the Declaration of the Rights of Man and of the Citizen (Déclaration des droits de l'Homme et du citoyen) can be encapsulated as follows: (1) Men are born, and always continue, free and equal in respect of their rights. Civil distinctions, therefore, can be founded only on public utility. (2) The end of all political associations is the preservation of the natural and imprescriptible rights of man; and these rights are liberty, property, security, and resistance of oppression. (3) The nation is essentially the source of all sovereignty; neither can any individual, nor any body of men, be entitled to any authority, which is not expressly derived from it.

These capsulations are akin to the concept of self-evident truths laid out in the U.S. Declaration of Independence.

== Welfare ==
In the closing chapters of Rights of Man, Paine addresses the condition of the poor and outlines a detailed social welfare proposal predicated upon the redirection of government expenditures. From the onset, Paine asserts all citizens have an inherent claim to welfare. Unlike such writers as James Burgh who sought to limit assistance to the better behaved segments of the poor, Paine declares welfare is not charity, but an irrevocable right. Paine's understanding of welfare seemingly follows his idea of political government. He notes, "Man did not enter into society to become worse than he was before, nor to have fewer rights than he had before, but to have those rights better secured". In congruence with his previous works, Paine emphasizes the compatibility between individual rights and societal wellbeing. He fervently contends that crippling poverty undermines the rights of an individual, and consequently the legitimacy of government.

Accordingly, Paine staunchly opposed and criticizes the English Poor Laws in place at the time, claiming the laws are highly ineffective and primitive in nature. Paine critiques the societal conditions promulgated by the Poor Laws saying, "When in countries that are called civilized, we see age going to the workhouse and youth to the gallows, something must be wrong with the system of government". He argues for their complete abolition, and in their place the enactment of a welfare program that assists the young, old, and struggling individuals.

Paine's welfare proposal is pillared by education and tax reform; the latter was to be accomplished through progressive taxes on property. Paine contends the poor population consists mostly of children and the elderly, who are unable to participate in the workforce. In addition to the elderly and children, Paine also concedes that there are still some others rendered poor from the economic burden of tax and children. In accordance with his belief that charity is a natural right, Paine presumes only republican or democratic regimes can effectively carry out successful welfare programs. Though Paine does not directly condone or promote an uprising against the British monarchy, and utilizes rather subdued rhetoric in comparison to his other controversial works, revolutionary currents run beneath the surface of the text.

An implication that arises from Paine's social welfare reformation is cost. Paine observes, at the time of his writing, England's rough population to be about 7 million people. He also supposes that around one-fifth of the population is poor. The number of poor then, according to Paine's estimations, would total around 1,400,000 people in need of support. Paine contends the remedy for financing such a large welfare endeavor would be to cut military expenditures of the state and redirect the funds towards the people of the state. Paine argues that since the age of revolution rendered a new era of peace, the government no longer need devote so many resources toward monarchical wars. Instead, Paine suggests, the surplus of tax revenue could be reintegrated back into society with the formation of a welfare program. He also estimates that nearly £4 million, out of £17 million in total tax revenues from customs and excise duties, could be salvaged from the government's expenditure and redirected and redistributed to the people of the nation. Paine questions, "Is it, then, better that the lives of one hundred and forty thousand aged persons be rendered comfortable, or that a million a year of public money be expended on any one individual, and him often of the most worthless or insignificant character?" Paine concludes that by his model £3,640,000 will be remitted to the poor. Paine's allotments for the poor and elderly were far more generous than contemporary payments from the poor rates.

=== Youth and education ===
Education is a foundational cornerstone of Paine's welfare plan. Paine claims, "A nation under a well-regulated government, should permit none to remain uninstructed". Paine largely focuses on educating the youth population. He contends that, educating children will ultimately compel the betterment of society holistically. Paine insists a proactive social welfare system that educates the country's youth, will act as a preventive measure, and engender greater knowledge amongst the population. He explains that poor children and young people are typically deprived of equal access to education. Poor children coming from poor families are often forced to seek apprenticeships and work, and are thus subsequently robbed of the ability to pursue education. Thus, poverty becomes cyclical in nature and undoubtedly increases with time. Lack of education amongst the young population, Paine asserts, also leads to increased violence and crime. To combat this problem, Paine proposes a remission of taxes to poor families. Granting families £4 a year for every child under the age of 14, parents could send their children to school. For 630,000 children, Paine estimates the cost to be £2,520,000. Paine states, "By adopting this method, not only the poverty of the parents will be relieved, but ignorance will be banished from the rising generation, and the number of poor will hereafter become less, because their abilities, by the aid of education, will be greater". Paine's advocacy for education among the poor was novel not only in 1792, but in 1807 when Davies Giddy criticized Samuel Whitbread's bill for the establishment of parish schools. In the same vein, Paine also suggest women should receive maternity benefits immediately after the birth of a child.

=== Elderly ===
Paramount to Paine's welfare plan is care of the elderly population. Paine divides age into two classes; the first he calls "the approach of age" class and the second "old age" class. Those classified as being in the "approach of age" group are over fifty years of age yet under 60 years of age, while "old age" commences at the age of sixty years old. Paine notes that though individuals in the approach of age class retain their mental faculties, the decline of their physical health limits their ability to work, which consequently affects their earnings. Those of old age, Paine declares, are fully incapable of laborious work and are ultimately driven to work themselves to death in current society. Paine resolves to pay approach of age persons the sum of £6 per annum out of the surplus taxes, and to pay old age persons £10 per annum. Figuring there will be 70,000 persons in the approach of age class and 70,000 persons in the old age class, Paine estimates the expense to be £1,120,000.

=== Proposal conditions ===
In tandem with redirecting government expenditures, Paine suggests the development of what some may call a "workhouse", or place of employment for poor people. Paine's describes the workhouse as being a building, or buildings, with the capability of holding a minimum of 6,000 people. In these buildings, operating businesses would indiscriminately accept applications, so that every city citizen could find employment. In order for his plan to be carried out effectively, Paine writes that each person seeking employment from these workhouses must stay in the program for a minimum of three months; however, during their residency all employees shall receive wholesome meals, warm lodgings, receive a proportional stipend for the work they've completed, and may work as long or as little as they deem appropriate. The asylum, Paine declares, would assist any persons in temporary distress and would serve around 24,000 people a year. To finance the development of this project, Paine suggest using the revenue from the state's coal tax. At the time Paine was writing, this notorious tax was used to support the Duke of Richmond and thus known as the "Richmond shilling"; Paine found this to be deplorable, and called for the coal tax to be reallocated to better serve the people.

Paine concludes his section on welfare by listing the eight central tenets of his welfare proposal, or what he calls the "enumerating particulars", which are as follows:

1. Abolish 2 million poor rates.
2. Provision for 252,000 poor families.
3. Education for 1,030,000 children.
4. Comfortable provision for 140,000 aged persons.
5. Donation of 20 shillings each for 50,000 births.
6. Donation of 20 shillings each for 20,000 marriages.
7. Allowance of £20,000 for the funeral expenses of deceased travelers far from home.
8. Employment at all times for the casual poor in cities.

== Analysis and public impact ==
According to Mark Philp, "In many respects Rights of Man is a disordered mix of narrative, principled argument, and rhetorical appeal—betraying the composite materials Paine used and the speed with which it was composed."

It was quickly reprinted and widely circulated, with copies being read aloud in inns and coffee houses, so that by May some 50,000 copies were said to be in circulation. Of the 300 or more pamphlets which the revolution controversy spawned, Rights of Man was the first to seriously damage Burke's case and to restore credit to the French both in Britain and America.

The publication of Rights of Man caused a furore in England; Paine was tried in absentia, and convicted of seditious libel against the Crown, but was unavailable for hanging, being in France and never returning to England. (Sir Archibald Macdonald, 1st Baronet served as the prosecutor.)

Thomas Paine was not the only advocate of the rights of man or the only author of a work titled Rights of Man. The working-class radical Thomas Spence is among the first in England to use the phrase as a title. His 1775 lecture, usually titled The Rights of Man, and his later The Rights of Infants, offer a proto-Georgist take on political philosophy mirroring Paine's work Agrarian Justice. Paine's acquaintance Mary Wollstonecraft, whom he met via their common publisher, wrote A Vindication of the Rights of Men as one of the first responses to Burke's attack on Richard Price. Her work was in print in December 1790, and was well reviewed. She extended the arguments in the book for which she is best remembered, the 1792 A Vindication of the Rights of Woman.

== See also ==
- Declaration of the Rights of Man and of the Citizen – a fundamental document of the French Revolution, adopted in 1789
- Social contract
- Thomas Muir (political reformer)

== Sources ==
- Butler, Marilyn (1984). Burke, Paine, Godwin, and the Revolution Controversy. Cambridge: Cambridge University Press. ISBN 0-521-28656-5.
- Marshall, Peter H. (2008) [1992]. Demanding the Impossible: A History of Anarchism. London: Harper Perennial. ISBN 978-0-00-686245-1. OCLC 218212571.
- Thomas, Richard Gough (2019). William Godwin: A Political Life. London: Pluto Press. ISBN 978-1-7868-0389-4. OCLC 1090781689.
