= James A. Murray =

James A. Murray may refer to:

- James Albert Murray (1932–2020), Roman Catholic bishop
- James Alexander Murray (1864–1960), Conservative politician and Premier of New Brunswick
- James Augustus Henry Murray, first editor of the Oxford English Dictionary
- James A. Murray (zoologist), zoologist and museum curator in Karachi
- James Andrew Murray, uncle and mentor of U.S. Senator James E. Murray

== See also ==
- James Murray (disambiguation)
