= 1914 North West Durham by-election =

1914 UK parliamentary by-election

North West Durham (including Consett and Lanchester) within northern Durham, showing boundaries used in 1914

The 1914 North West Durham by-election was a Parliamentary by-election held on 30 January 1914. It returned one Member of Parliament (MP) to the House of Commons of the United Kingdom, elected by the first past the post voting system.

== Vacancy ==
Llewellyn Atherley-Jones, the Liberal MP for North West Durham resigned his seat. He was appointed a Judge of the City of London Court, which meant he had to halt his political career. He had been the local MP since the constituency was created in 1885. He had started his legal career as the Barrister for the Miners' National Union, giving him a particular affinity with the large number of miners living in the constituency.

== Previous result ==
The seat had always been a safe Liberal seat, and was so at the last election;

Atherley-Jones

General election December 1910 Electorate 18,361
Party	Candidate	Votes	%	±%
Liberal	Llewellyn Atherley-Jones	8,998	65.1	−1.7
Conservative	James Ogden Hardicker	4,827	34.9	+1.7
Majority		4,171	30.2	−3.4
Turnout		13,825	75.3	−10.3
Liberal hold		Swing	-1.7	

== Candidates ==
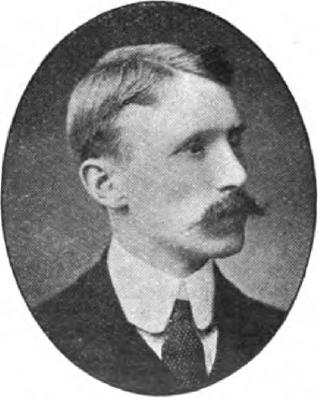
Stuart-Bunning

- The Liberal candidate adopted on 4 January 1914 was the radical Aneurin Williams. He was Liberal MP for Plymouth (UK Parliament constituency) between the two general elections of 1910. He was chairman of the executive committee of the Land Nationalisation Society and a director of the First Garden City Ltd. He belonged to a Middlesbrough firm of ironmasters.
- The Unionist candidate was James Ogden Hardicker. He had been their defeated candidate at the last General Election in December 1910.
- The Labour Party decided to intervene, having never fielded a candidate here before. Their candidate, 44-year-old G. H. Stuart-Bunning was well travelled. He had stood at the York division of Yorkshire at the 1906 general election, then in the 1908 Dundee by-election in Scotland, then at the January 1910 general election at Eccles in Lancashire, before alighting in Durham. In each case he had finished bottom of the poll. He had no links to the constituency or to the mining industry. He was sponsored by the Postmen's Federation.

== Campaign ==
Aneurin Williams

Polling Day was set for 30 January 1914. Given the large number of miners and iron-workers among the electorate, issues affecting those voters were expected to feature.

The Liberal candidate Aneurin Williams launched his campaign at a public meeting in Consett on 5 January 1914, at which he was supported by his brother, the Liberal MP for Middlesbrough, Penry Williams. On 6 January 1914, Williams spoke at the Co-operative Hall, Stanley sharing a platform with Mr. Straughan. On 9 January 1914 Williams spoke at a public meeting in Quebec alongside the Rev. Thomas Dale of Waterhouses, who said the Liberal party in the division had secured a very worthy candidate.

On 20 January 1914, the Liberal candidate, Aneurin Williams declared that he advocated Irish Home Rule, religious equality in Wales, the abolition of Plural voting, further reform of the House of Lords, land and housing reform and popular control over licences. Other issues to feature in his campaign included a defence of National Insurance and improvements to the conditions of agricultural labourers.

About 2,000 Irishmen were electors in the constituency. With the Liberal Government currently steering through parliament, the 3rd Irish Home Rule Bill, Home Rule was the main issue of the by-election. The Labour candidate as well as the Liberal candidate agreed with the Liberal Government's policy. The Unionist candidate was left to defend the actions of the likes of Sir Edward Carson who called on Ulster Unionists to resist the British Government "by any means".

The issue of Women's suffrage also featured in the campaign. A combination of the Unionist Party, the Irish Nationalists and a minority of Liberals had defeated the measure earlier in the parliament. The Liberal candidate, Aneurin Williams was a vocal supporter of giving women the vote while his Unionist opponent Hardicker was an opponent. Despite this, the National Union of Women's Suffrage Societies chose to enter the campaign in support of the Labour Party candidate, greatly increasing the chances of victory for the anti-suffrage Unionist candidate. It was announced on 15 January 1914 that the Militant Women's Social and Political Union had established campaign headquarters in Consett to also campaign in support of the Labour candidate.

The influential Durham Miners' Association had initially withheld their official support from the Labour Party candidate, but their executive committee passed a motion calling on all miners to support the Socialist candidate. Although there was a sizeable mining community in the constituency, the Association had not pressed to have their own candidate. The fact that the Labour Party candidate was neither local nor a miner, meant he had limited appeal to their members. At this time the Durham Miners were fairly evenly split between those like their President William House, who supported the Labour Party and those like their General Secretary John Wilson who supported the Liberal Party. The pro-Labour Party element of the Union were still reeling from the 1913 Houghton-le-Spring by-election when House stood as a DMA endorsed Labour Party candidate and came third, while miners lodges across the constituency supported the Liberal, who won despite not being a miner. However, that did not stop individual miners leaders taking different sides in the campaign. On 20 January, the Liberal Aneurin Williams spoke at the Council School, Tanfield Lea. He shared the platform with J. J. Gray, a checkweigher at the Tanfield Lea Colliery. On 21 January 1914 Williams spoke at the Miners' Hall, South Moor in front of an audience of about 300.

Nominations closed on 23 January 1914, confirming this was the first three-cornered contest in the division.

The Liberal and Labour candidates argued over who was the more genuine representative of the workers. The Labour campaign focused on a handful of English trade unionists who had been deported from South Africa for trying to organise a General Strike. The Times reported that this news could result in 500 Liberal voters switching to the Labour Party candidate.

On 29 January 1914, the eve of poll, Williams received a telegram of support from David Lloyd George in which he stated "Looking forward to the pleasure of welcoming you back as a member of the House Commons. Your practical acquaintance with social problems, especially housing, will be most valued."

== Result ==
Williams victory as portrayed in the local press

The result was declared on Saturday afternoon, 31 January at Lanchester in front of a large crowd. Williams held the seat for the Liberals. The Unionist vote share was also down in December 1910;

1914 North West Durham by-election Electorate 20,233
Party	Candidate	Votes	%	±%
Liberal	Aneurin Williams	7,241	40.6	−24.5
Unionist	James Ogden Hardicker	5,564	31.2	−3.7
Labour	G. H. Stuart-Bunning	5,026	28.2	New
Majority		1,677	9.4	−20.8
Turnout		17,831	88.1	+12.8
Liberal hold		Swing	-10.4	

Although the Liberal majority had been massively reduced, they had every reason to be satisfied as the result was seen as an endorsement of the government's Irish policies, achieving a majority of 8,703 when the two pro-Home Rule candidates votes were combined. Following the announcement of the result, cheering Liberal supporters carried Williams shoulder high to his car from where he started a tour of the constituency to thank the voters. He made a statement to the press in which he said that he regarded the result as a "triumph for the principals of radical social reform as against Tariff Reform." The Unionist candidate Hardicker was forced to admit that the electorate had demonstrated its approval of the Liberal Government. The Socialist candidate, Stuart-Bunning stated that he would only return to fight the seat again if the executive of the Postal Federation were prepared to fund his campaign.

== Aftermath ==
A General Election was due to take place by the end of 1915. By the autumn of 1914, the following candidates had been adopted to contest that election.

- Liberal Party: Aneurin Williams
- Unionist Party: James Hardicker

Due to the outbreak of war, the election never took place. In 1916 Williams was appointed to the Speaker's Conference to discuss giving women the vote and helped to steer through the change implemented in 1918.

General election 14 December 1918: Consett Electorate 34,393
Party	Candidate	Votes	%	±%
Liberal	Aneurin Williams	7,576	34.2	
National Democratic	Robert Gee	7,283	32.9	
Labour	G. H. Stuart-Bunning	7,268	32.8	
Majority		293	1.3	
Turnout		22,127	64.3	
Liberal hold		Swing		

- Gee was the endorsed candidate of the Coalition Government.
