= Richard Holden (British politician) =

British politician (born 1985)

The Right Honourable Richard Holden MP
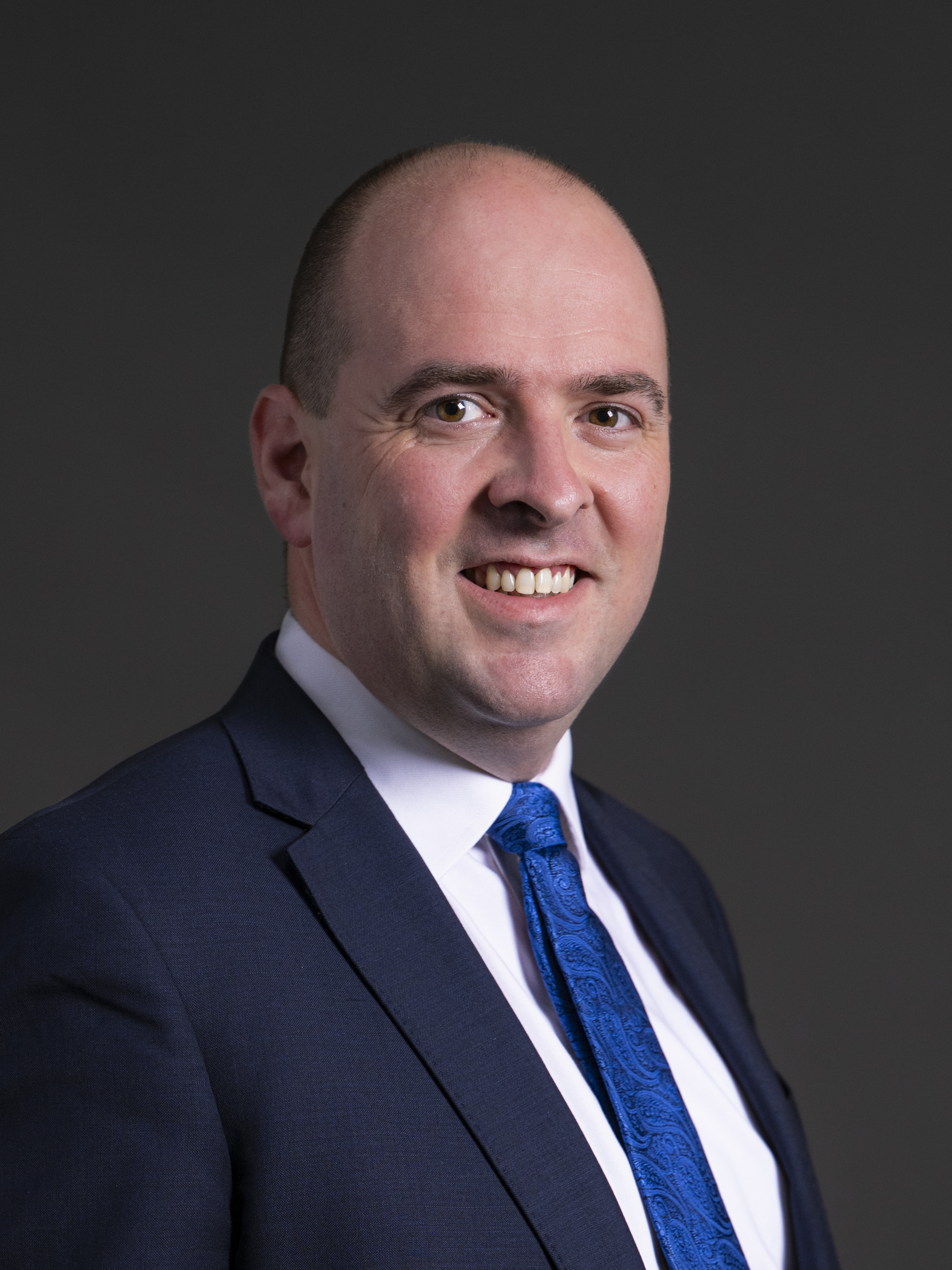
- Official portrait, 2026

Shadow Secretary of State for Transport
- Incumbent
- Assumed office 22 July 2025
- Leader: Kemi Badenoch
- Preceded by: Gareth Bacon

Shadow Paymaster General
- In office 8 November 2024 – 22 July 2025
- Leader: Kemi Badenoch
- Preceded by: John Glen
- Succeeded by: Harriett Baldwin (2026)

Chairman of the Conservative Party Minister without Portfolio
- In office 13 November 2023 – 5 July 2024
- Leader: Rishi Sunak
- Preceded by: Greg Hands
- Succeeded by: Richard Fuller (Chairman); Ellie Reeves (Minister)

Parliamentary Under Secretary of State for Roads and Local Transport
- In office 28 October 2022 – 13 November 2023
- Prime Minister: Rishi Sunak
- Preceded by: Katherine Fletcher
- Succeeded by: Guy Opperman

Member of Parliament for Basildon and Billericay
- Incumbent
- Assumed office 4 July 2024
- Preceded by: John Baron
- Majority: 20 (0.05%)

Member of Parliament for North West Durham
- In office 12 December 2019 – 30 May 2024
- Preceded by: Laura Pidcock
- Succeeded by: Liz Twist (Blaydon and Consett)

Personal details
- Born: Richard John Holden; 11 March 1985 (age 41) Blackburn, Lancashire, England
- Party: Conservative
- Domestic partner: Kate Ferguson
- Education: London School of Economics (BSc)
- Website: Official website

Richard John Holden (born 11 March 1985) is a British politician who has been the Member of Parliament (MP) for Basildon and Billericay since 2024 and Shadow Transport Secretary since July 2025. He also served as Shadow Paymaster General from November 2024 to July 2025. A member of the Conservative Party, he was previously the Member of Parliament for North West Durham from 2019 to 2024. Holden served as the Chairman of the Conservative Party and Minister without Portfolio from November 2023 to July 2024, and as Parliamentary Under Secretary of State for Roads and Local Transport from 2022 to 2023.

== Early life and political career ==
Richard Holden was born on 11 March 1985 in Blackburn to Mark and Joan Holden. He grew up in Grindleton, a village in the Ribble Valley, and attended Grindleton Primary School, Ermysted's Grammar School in Skipton and Queen Elizabeth's Grammar School in Blackburn. He then went to St Mary's College in Blackburn, before studying at the London School of Economics, graduating with a BSc in Government and History in 2007. Holden was employed as a waiter and bar staff for Emporium Ltd in Clitheroe from 2002 to 2006.

Holden started work at Conservative Campaign Headquarters (CCHQ) in August 2007, initially as a Data Entry Officer. The following year, he became a Media Monitoring Officer, and was a Duty Press Officer from 2008 to 2010. Holden was Political Press Adviser from 2010 to 2012, and promoted to Deputy Head of Press in 2012.

After the 2015 general election, he became a special adviser to Lord Privy Seal and Leader of the House of Lords Baroness Stowell of Beeston, before leaving to work for Theresa May's 2016 Conservative Party leadership election campaign. He also worked for Stowell's successor as Leader of the House of Lords, Baroness Evans of Bowes Park, before becoming a special adviser to the Secretary of State for Defence, Sir Michael Fallon, between October 2016 and April 2017.

Holden became a special adviser to former Secretary of State for Transport Chris Grayling in December 2018, before leaving to work on Boris Johnson's 2019 Conservative Party leadership election campaign. He then worked as a special adviser to Secretary of State for Education Gavin Williamson from August to November 2019. When Parliament was dissolved for the election, Holden began working for CCHQ, before being selected as a prospective parliamentary candidate for North West Durham.

== Parliamentary career ==
At the 2015 general election, Holden stood as the Conservative candidate in Preston, coming second with 20% of the vote behind the incumbent Labour MP Mark Hendrick.

Holden was elected to Parliament at the 2019 general election as MP for North West Durham with 41.9% of the vote and a majority of 1,144.

Holden was a member of the Public Accounts Committee between March 2020 and March 2022. Since he became an MP he has written a fortnightly column for the political blog ConservativeHome.

He was elected to the Executive of the 1922 Committee in July 2021. He is on the committee of the All-Party Parliamentary Group on Gambling-Related Harm, and has spoken and written extensively about his view that there must be tighter regulation of online gambling.

In February 2020, he led a campaign to reverse the increase in Vehicle Excise Duty (VED) paid on new motorhomes. The tax had been increased in September 2019 in response to EU regulation 2018/1832. In the March 2020 Budget the Chancellor of the Exchequer, Rishi Sunak, announced that the VED increase would be reversed, a tax cut worth £25 million a year to consumers and the industry.

In March 2021 Holden led a group of 80 Conservative MPs in writing to the Chancellor of the Exchequer asking him to introduce a new lower duty for beer sold on draught in pubs. He continued his campaign alongside fellow Conservative MP Mike Wood in meetings with Treasury Ministers, and in October 2021 he gathered more than 100 Conservative MPs to push the issues ahead of the 2021 Budget. In the 2021 Budget the government announced a new Draught Beer Duty rate for pubs and clubs 5 per cent lower than standard beer duty, cutting the tax on beer and cider sold in pubs by £100 million a year. Rishi Sunak credited both Holden and Wood for campaigning on the issue in his Budget Speech.

On 22 April 2022 Holden called for Durham Constabulary to investigate Keir Starmer, the Leader of the Labour Party, following reports in the media regarding potential breaches of COVID-19 regulations by attending a staff gathering during an election campaign that month. Durham Constabulary announced an investigation into the event on 6 May 2022. On 8 July 2022, Durham Constabulary announced that they would not be issuing any fixed penalty notices as they determined the gathering was covered by the "reasonably necessary work" exception in the regulations.

Holden endorsed Rishi Sunak in the July–September 2022 Conservative Party leadership election. He was appointed as Parliamentary Under Secretary of State for Roads and Local Transport in October 2022. Holden became Chairman of the Conservative Party and Minister without Portfolio on 13 November 2023 as part of a cabinet reshuffle.

He was sworn in as a member of the Privy Council on 13 December 2023 at Buckingham Palace following his appointment, entitling him to the honorific prefix "The Right Honourable" for life.

On 5 June 2024, Holden was controversially made a parachute candidate for the safe Tory seat of Basildon and Billericay, to the strong opposition of local members. This was despite Holden having stated he was "bloody loyal to the north-east" earlier in the year. At the 2024 general election, Holden was elected to Parliament as MP for Basildon and Billericay with 30.6% of the vote and a majority of 20.

On 8 July 2024, Holden resigned as chairman of the Conservative Party, replaced by Richard Fuller as interim chairman. He became Shadow Paymaster General in the Opposition Frontbench of Kemi Badenoch in November 2024.

In December 2024, Holden introduced a ten minute rule bill calling for the outlawing of marriage between first cousins.

In July 2025, Holden was appointed Shadow Transport Secretary, replacing Gareth Bacon.

== Personal life ==
Holden is a member of the Carlton Club in London and the Steel Club in Consett. In May 2021 Holden was fined £100 for dropping a cigarette outside an election count venue during the 2021 local elections. He had previously led a litter-picking campaign in 2020.

In 2018, Holden was unanimously acquitted by a jury of a charge of sexual assault made in 2016. The judge in the case told him he "left court without any stain on his character" and Holden received substantial damages and costs following the case. Following the conclusion of the trial, Holden gave interviews and wrote about the case and its impact on him.

Holden is in a relationship with Kate Ferguson, political editor of The Sun on Sunday.

== Electoral history ==
General election 2019: North West Durham
Party	Candidate	Votes	%	±%
Conservative	Richard Holden	19,990	41.9	▲7.4
Labour	Laura Pidcock	18,846	39.5	▼13.3
Brexit Party	John Wolstenholme	3,193	6.7	New
Liberal Democrats	Michael Peacock	2,831	5.9	▼1.2
Independent	Watts Stelling	1,216	2.6	New
Green	David Sewell	1,173	2.5	▲1.4
Independent	David Lindsay	414	0.9	New
Majority		1,144	2.4	N/A
Turnout		47,663	66.0	▼0.5
Conservative gain from Labour		Swing	▲10.4	

General election 2024: Basildon and Billericay
Party	Candidate	Votes	%	±%
Conservative	Richard Holden	12,905	30.6	−35.2
Labour	Alex Harrison	12,885	30.6	+9.0
Reform	Stephen Conlay	11,354	27.0	New
Liberal Democrats	Edward Sainsbury	2,292	5.4	−3.0
Green	Stewart Goshawk	2,123	5.0	+2.1
British Democrats	Christopher Bateman	373	0.9	New
TUSC	Dave Murray	192	0.5	New
Majority		20	0.04	−44.2
Turnout		42,124	54.8	−6.1
Registered electors		76,873		
Conservative hold		Swing	−22.2	

Parliament of the United Kingdom
Preceded by Laura Pidcock	Member of Parliament for North West Durham; 2019–2024	Constituency abolished
Preceded by John Baron	Member of Parliament for Basildon and Billericay; 2024–present	Incumbent
Political offices
Preceded by Greg Hands	Minister without Portfolio; 2023–2024	Succeeded by Ellie Reeves
Party political offices
Preceded by Greg Hands	Chairman of the Conservative Party; 2023–2024	Succeeded by Richard Fuller
