= Hilary Armstrong =

British politician (born 1945)

The Right Honourable The Baroness Armstrong of Hill Top PC DL
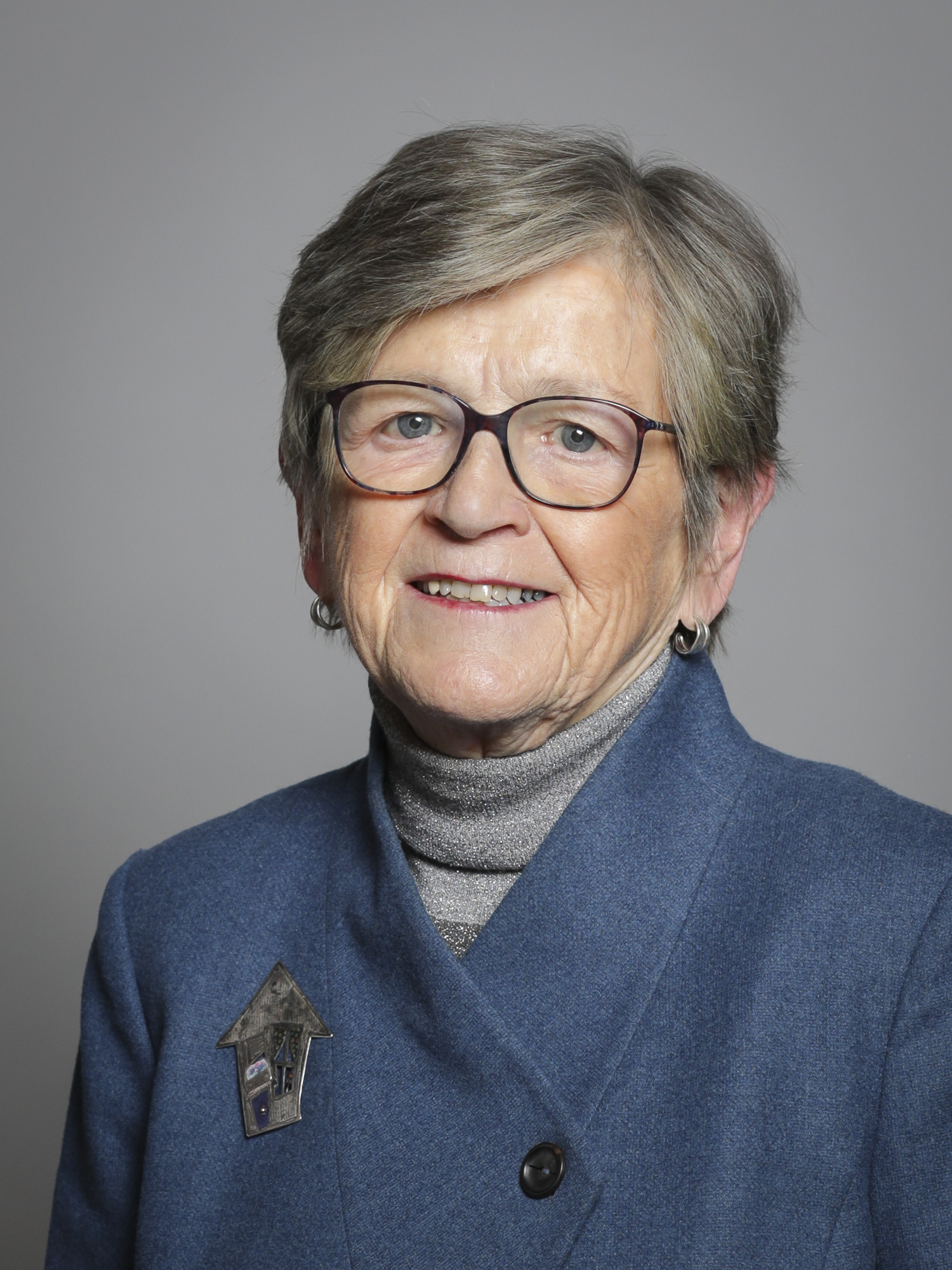
- Official portrait, 2019

Minister for the Cabinet Office Chancellor of the Duchy of Lancaster
- In office 5 May 2006 – 28 June 2007
- Prime Minister: Tony Blair
- Preceded by: Jim Murphy (Acting)
- Succeeded by: Ed Miliband

Minister for Social Exclusion
- In office 5 May 2006 – 28 June 2007
- Prime Minister: Tony Blair
- Preceded by: Phil Woolas
- Succeeded by: Position abolished

Chief Whip of the House of Commons Parliamentary Secretary to the Treasury
- In office 8 June 2001 – 5 May 2006
- Prime Minister: Tony Blair
- Deputy: Keith Hill; Bob Ainsworth
- Preceded by: Ann Taylor
- Succeeded by: Jacqui Smith

Minister of State for Local Government
- In office 2 May 1997 – 8 June 2001
- Prime Minister: Tony Blair
- Preceded by: David Curry
- Succeeded by: Nick Raynsford

Minister of State for Housing and Planning
- In office 2 May 1997 – 29 July 1999
- Prime Minister: Tony Blair
- Preceded by: Robert Jones
- Succeeded by: Nick Raynsford

Parliamentary Private Secretary to the Leader of the Opposition
- In office 24 July 1992 – 12 May 1994
- Leader: John Smith
- Preceded by: Adam Ingram
- Succeeded by: Bruce Grocott

Member of the House of Lords
- Lord Temporal
- Life peerage 18 June 2010

Member of Parliament for North West Durham
- In office 11 June 1987 – 12 April 2010
- Preceded by: Ernest Armstrong
- Succeeded by: Pat Glass

Personal details
- Born: 30 November 1945 (age 80) Sunderland, County Durham, England
- Party: Labour
- Spouse: Paul Corrigan
- Education: University of East London; University of Birmingham
- Website: Official website

Hilary Jane Armstrong, Baroness Armstrong of Hill Top (born 30 November 1945), is a British Labour Party politician who was Member of Parliament (MP) for North West Durham from 1987 to 2010.

== Early life ==
Armstrong was born on 30 November 1945 to Hannah P. Lamb and Ernest Armstrong, a Labour Party politician. She attended Monkwearmouth Grammar School before going on to take a BSc in sociology at West Ham Technical Institute (now the University of East London) and a Diploma in Social Work from the University of Birmingham. A former social worker and university lecturer, Armstrong worked for VSO in Kenya before entering politics. She was first elected as Durham County Councillor for Crook North Division in 1985.

She was shortlisted for the vacant Sedgefield constituency in 1983, only to lose out to Tony Blair, who went on to be elected MP. Four years later, at the 1987 general election, she was elected to her father's North West Durham seat on his retirement, increasing his majority by 3,806 to 10,162.

== Parliamentary career ==
Armstrong was parliamentary private secretary to John Smith during his time as Labour leader, and played a large part in his successful fight to institute One member, one vote at Labour's party conference.

Armstrong was seen as a politician on the right of the Labour Party, and was close politically to her near neighbour Tony Blair and the New Labour agenda. However, she is also a member of the Amicus trades union (formerly MSF). Her union ties helped her gain support in rewriting Clause IV.

In the 1992 general election, Armstrong retained her North West Durham constituency by defeating two future party leaders, Theresa May of the Conservatives, who became prime minister in 2016, and Tim Farron of the Liberal Democrats.

=== In government ===
Armstrong spent two years as Minister for Housing and Planning and four years as Minister for Local Government in the Department for the Environment, Transport, and the Regions and then the Department for Transport, Local Government, and the Regions, before being promoted into the Cabinet of the United Kingdom as Chief Whip after the 2001 election. This was the high point of a political career which was low-key but generally successful; though she endured controversies over select committee membership and over allegations of strong arm tactics with Labour dissenters over military action in Afghanistan.

Armstrong also faced criticism after government defeats in the Commons over the length of time suspected terrorists could be detained without charge, and incitement to religious hatred provisions in the Prevention of Terrorism Act 2005. Press commentators speculated that in losing these votes through miscalculating government support, and in one instance letting the Prime Minister off the "Whip" because she believed the vote was won, Armstrong's position had become vulnerable. However the rumours that she would resign the post proved unfounded.

Afterwards, Conservative leader David Cameron mocked Armstrong during an exchange with Tony Blair, saying "She must be the first Chief Whip in history to put the Prime Minister in the frame for losing a key vote—which is an interesting career move, to say the least." This was the second time David Cameron had attacked her during Prime Minister's Questions; on his debut as Leader of the Opposition on 7 December 2005, Cameron singled her out by saying, "That's the problem with these exchanges—the chief whip on the Labour side shouting like a child. Is she finished? Are you finished?"

On 5 May 2006 Armstrong was appointed Chancellor of the Duchy of Lancaster, Minister for the Cabinet Office and Minister for Social Exclusion. In 2006, Armstrong launched a petition on behalf of the Bethnal Green and Bow Labour Party against Labour turned Respect MP George Galloway's participation in Channel 4's Celebrity Big Brother. She criticised Galloway for being paid as an MP during the time he was in the Big Brother house. Galloway responded by saying he planned to refund the taxpayer after his exit from the show as he would not know how much to refund until then.

She formally resigned from the government on 27 June 2007 when Tony Blair resigned as prime minister, she was succeeded by Ed Miliband the following day. On becoming prime minister, Gordon Brown announced Armstrong's appointment as chair of a Parliamentary Labour Party Manifesto Committee drawing up policy ideas covering children.

== Post-Government ==
On 4 July 2009, Armstrong announced her intention to stand down at the 2010 general election.

On 18 June 2010, she was created a life peer as Baroness Armstrong of Hill Top, of Crook in the County of Durham, and was introduced in the House of Lords on 6 July 2010.

She was interviewed in 2014 as part of The History of Parliament's oral history project.

She is a member of the Joint Committee on the Draft Domestic Abuse Bill.

On 19 July 2019, Armstrong's North West Durham constituency party voted to expel her from the party after she and 67 other Labour peers published an advert in The Guardian on 17 July claiming that Jeremy Corbyn had “failed the test of leadership” over his handling of antisemitism complaints within Labour. However, the vote was non-binding as only the National Executive has the mandate to expel members. She is a member of Labour Friends of Israel.

== Personal life ==
Armstrong is married to Paul Corrigan.

Parliament of the United Kingdom
Preceded by Ernest Armstrong	Member of Parliament for North West Durham; 1987–2010	Succeeded by Pat Glass
Political offices
Preceded by Ann Taylor	Government Chief Whip in the House of Commons; 2001–2006	Succeeded by Jacqui Smith
Preceded by Ann Taylor	Parliamentary Secretary to the Treasury; 2001–2006	Succeeded by Jacqui Smith
Preceded by Jim Murphy; Acting	Minister for the Cabinet Office; 2006–2007	Succeeded by Ed Miliband
Preceded by Jim Murphy; Acting	Chancellor of the Duchy of Lancaster; 2006–2007	Succeeded by Ed Miliband
Preceded by Phil Woolas	Minister for Social Exclusion; 2006–2007	Position abolished
Party political offices
Preceded by Ann Taylor	Labour Chief Whip in the House of Commons; 2001–2006	Succeeded by Jacqui Smith
