= Samuel Galbraith =

Liberal party politician and trade unionist

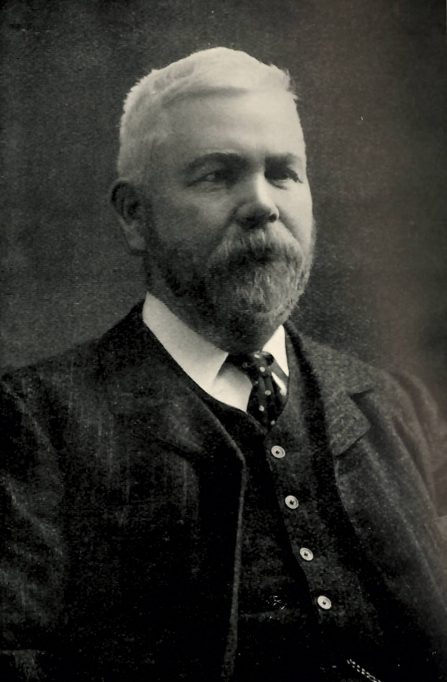
Galbraith in the 1900s

Samuel Galbraith JP OBE (4 July 1853 – 10 April 1936) was a Liberal Party politician and Trade Unionist in the United Kingdom.

== Background ==
Galbraith was born in Ballydrain, Comber, Ulster, a son of Samuel Galbraith. He was self educated. In 1886, he married Helen King Petty. In 1917 he was awarded the Order of the British Empire.

== Career ==
Galbraith started work as a checkweighman at Browney colliery. He worked as a Miners' Agent from 1900 to 1915. He became a Secretary of the Durham Miners' Association.

== Politics ==
Galbraith was an elected member of Durham County Council from 1888 to 1900 and an appointed Alderman from 1900 to 1936. He was elected unopposed as Member of Parliament (MP) for Mid Durham at a by-election in 1915, sponsored by the Durham Miners' Association. When that constituency was abolished for the 1918 general election, he was selected for the new Spennymoor seat and again sponsored by the Durham Miners. The Coalition Liberal Chief Whip, Freddie Guest regarded him as a supporter of the Coalition government. However, the Coalition government did not endorse him or his Labour opponent, but he was still easily re-elected;

General election 1918
Party	Candidate	Votes	%	±%
Liberal	Samuel Galbraith	9,443	53.5	n/a
Labour	Joseph Batey	8,196	46.5	n/a
Majority			7.0	n/a
Turnout		17,639		n/a
Liberal hold		Swing	n/a	

After the election he sat on the Liberal benches in opposition to the Coalition government. He did not contest any further elections, and retired from Parliament at the 1922 general election, aged 69.

He served as a Justice of the Peace for the County of Durham.

Parliament of the United Kingdom
Preceded by John Wilson	Member of Parliament for Mid Durham; 1915–1918	Constituency abolished
New constituency	Member of Parliament for Spennymoor; 1918–1922	Succeeded by Joseph Batey
