= Pat Glass =

British former Labour politician

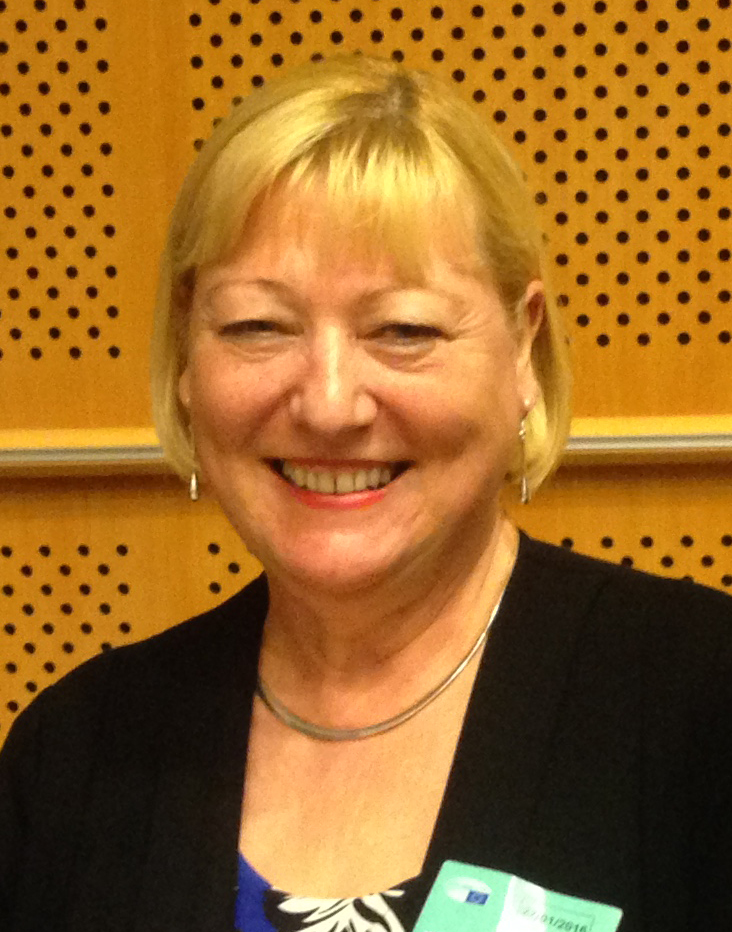
- Glass in 2016

Shadow Minister for Rail
- In office 9 October 2016 – 3 May 2017
- Leader: Jeremy Corbyn
- Preceded by: Andy McDonald
- Succeeded by: Rachael Maskell

Shadow Secretary of State for Education
- In office 27 June 2016 – 29 June 2016
- Leader: Jeremy Corbyn
- Preceded by: Lucy Powell
- Succeeded by: Angela Rayner

Shadow Minister of State for Europe
- In office 5 January 2016 – 27 June 2016
- Leader: Jeremy Corbyn
- Preceded by: Pat McFadden
- Succeeded by: Fabian Hamilton

Shadow Minister for Early Years
- In office 14 September 2015 – 5 January 2016
- Leader: Jeremy Corbyn
- Preceded by: Position Established
- Succeeded by: Jenny Chapman

Member of Parliament for North West Durham
- In office 6 May 2010 – 3 May 2017
- Preceded by: Hilary Armstrong
- Succeeded by: Laura Pidcock

Personal details
- Born: 14 February 1957 (age 69) Esh Winning, England, UK
- Party: Labour

Patricia Glass (born 14 February 1957) is a Labour Party former politician who was the Member of Parliament for North West Durham from 2010 to 2017. She was appointed Shadow Education Secretary on 27 June 2016 by Jeremy Corbyn, but resigned two days later after announcing that she would be standing down at the 2017 United Kingdom general election.

== Early life and career ==
She was born in Esh Winning, County Durham. Before becoming an MP, Glass worked in various positions with local education authorities, and became a Government Education Adviser specialising in Special Needs Education, and Assistant Director of Education in Sunderland and Greenwich.

Glass was elected as a councillor on Lanchester Parish Council in 2007. Subsequently she was selected as the Labour Party parliamentary candidate for North West Durham, with Hilary Armstrong due to retire at the 2010 general election.

== Political career ==
Glass was elected to the House of Commons at the 2010 general election as the Member of Parliament (MP) for North West Durham. Her particular interest is education, and has sat on the Education Select Committee

In 2014, Glass accused rival politicians in Parliament of "orchestrated barracking" of women with regional accents, saying "I get the impression they think women who are northerners should not be there."

In September 2015, Glass was appointed as Shadow Education Minister with responsibility for childcare by the newly elected Labour Party leader, Jeremy Corbyn. On 5 January 2016, she was named the Shadow Europe Minister after Corbyn had conducted the first reshuffle of his Shadow Cabinet.

Glass took a prominent role in Labour's campaign to remain in the EU in the June 2016 referendum campaign. On 19 May 2016, she apologised after calling a member of the public in Sawley, Derbyshire, "a horrible racist", which was caught at the end of a radio interview recording and reported by the media. She also added "I'm never coming back to wherever this is".

At a Labour rally, she suggested voters try to persuade their mothers and grandmothers to vote to stay in, but joked they didn't bother with their grandfathers because "the problem is older white men". She reported having received death threats during the referendum campaign, and on the advice of the police, she did not attend the referendum count.

On 27 June 2016, Glass was appointed Shadow Education Secretary following the resignation of Lucy Powell and several other Cabinet ministers in protest at Corbyn's leadership during the EU referendum. The next day, Glass announced that she would not stand at the 2017 general election. The day after that, she resigned as Shadow Education Secretary, saying that the "situation is untenable", and making the statement:

While I had always intended to do more than two terms in Parliament I have found the last six months very, very difficult. The referendum has been incredibly divisive, it divided families and communities and I have found it bruising in many respects. It has had an impact on both me and my family as I am sure it has had on many others.

Glass stood down at the 2017 snap general election, citing the "bruising referendum" as a major cause.

== Personal life ==
Glass lives with her husband Bob in Lanchester, County Durham. Bob Glass served on Durham County Council from 2013 to 2017 as the Councillor for Delves Lane ward. Her brother Martin Gannon is a Councillor on Gateshead Council and is currently leader of the Council.

Parliament of the United Kingdom
Preceded by Hilary Armstrong	Member of Parliament for North West Durham; 2010–2017	Succeeded by Laura Pidcock
Political offices
Preceded by Pat McFadden	Shadow Minister of State for Europe; 2016	Succeeded by Fabian Hamilton
Preceded by Lucy Powell	Shadow Secretary of State for Education; 2016	Succeeded by Angela Rayner
