= Laura Pidcock =

British Labour politician

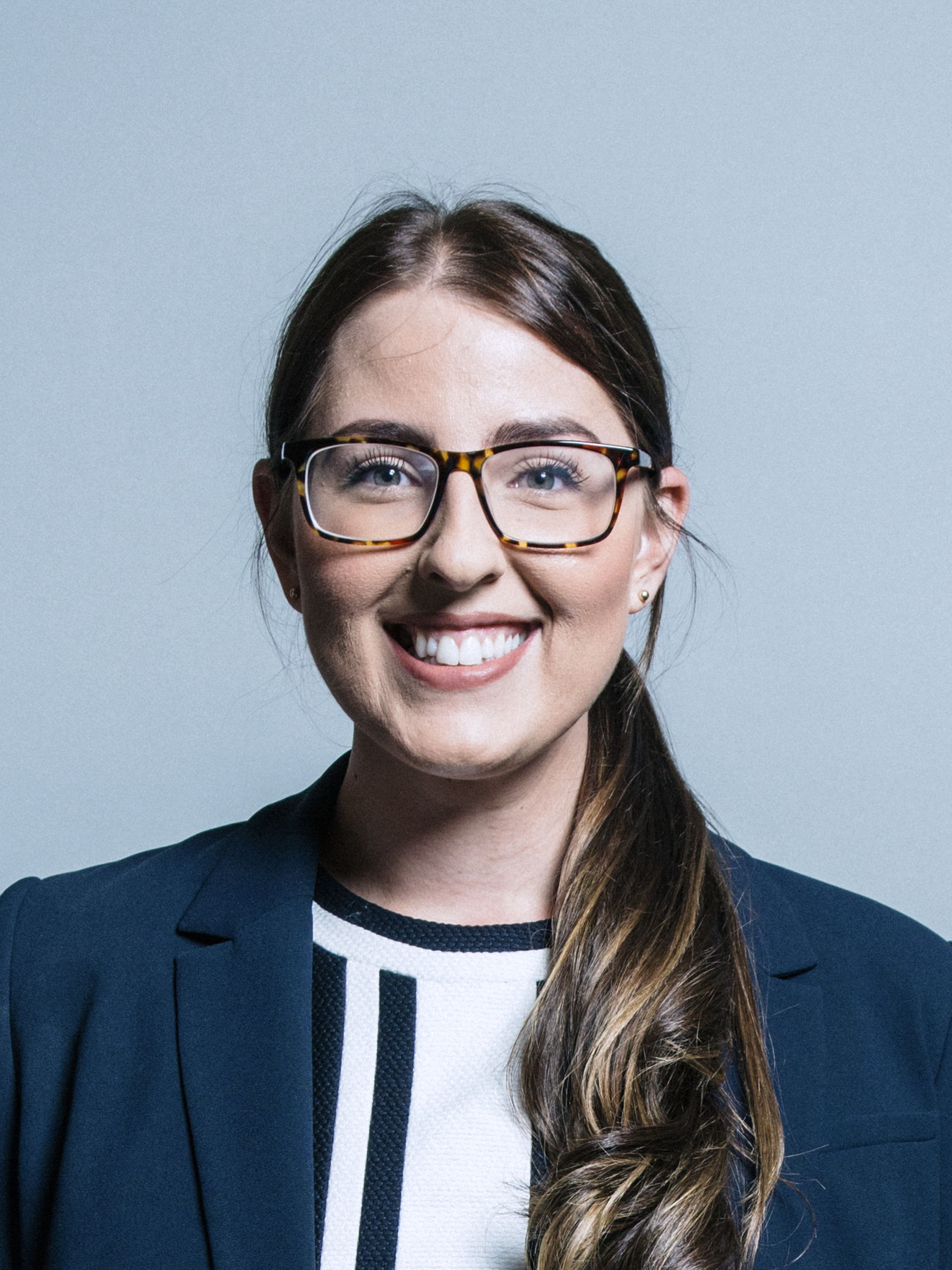
- Official portrait, 2017

Shadow Secretary of State for Employment Rights (Note: Office known as Shadow Minister for Labour until 10 September 2019.)
- In office 12 January 2018 – 12 December 2019
- Leader: Jeremy Corbyn
- Preceded by: Jack Dromey
- Succeeded by: Rachael Maskell

Member of Parliament for North West Durham
- In office 8 June 2017 – 6 November 2019
- Preceded by: Pat Glass
- Succeeded by: Richard Holden

Personal details
- Born: 19 August 1987 (age 39) North Shields, North Tyneside, England
- Party: Labour (until 2022)
- Children: 1
- Education: Manchester Metropolitan University (BA); Northumbria University (MSc)
- Profession: Politician

Laura Pidcock (born 19 August 1987) is a British former Labour Party politician who served as the Member of Parliament (MP) for North West Durham from 2017 until 2019. She served as Shadow Secretary of State for Employment Rights in Jeremy Corbyn's Shadow Cabinet. In the 2019 parliamentary election, she lost her seat to the Conservative Richard Holden, who won the constituency with a majority of 1,144.

Pidcock was elected to the National Executive Committee of the Labour Party in November 2020, from which she resigned in January 2022. She is currently the National Secretary of the People's Assembly Against Austerity. Pidcock is also co-director of media organisation Declassified UK.

== Early life ==
Pidcock was born in North Shields, North Tyneside and raised in New Hartley and Seaton Delaval, Northumberland. Her parents were both active in politics. Her mother Mary was a social worker while her father Bernard was an office manager who was a member of Northumberland County Council from 2008 until his death in February 2019. Pidcock recollects, at the age of 3, attending demonstrations with her parents against then-Prime Minister, Margaret Thatcher, and against the apartheid system in South Africa. Pidcock has stated, "From a very, very young age I was taught to see everything through a political lens and through a class lens", and that at school she was known as "the political one" and a "swot".

== Career ==
She studied politics at Manchester Metropolitan University, and was a mental health support worker before working within, then managing, the education team at anti-racism charity Show Racism the Red Card. She completed an MSc in Disaster Management and Sustainable Development at Northumbria University in 2012, with research focusing on children's institutions in Bulgaria.

Pidcock was councillor for Cramlington Eastfield division on Northumberland County Council until she lost her seat to the Conservative Party candidate in the 2017 local elections.

== Parliamentary career ==
Only weeks prior to the 2017 United Kingdom general election, Pidcock was selected to stand for Labour in North West Durham, when the previous MP, Pat Glass, stood down.

A feminist, she said in her maiden speech that the Palace of Westminster dated from "a time when my class and my sex would have been denied a place in it, because we are deemed unworthy". Her speech was shared over 200,000 times on social media in 48 hours.

On 12 January 2018, she was appointed Shadow Minister for Business, Energy and Industrial Strategy. Pidcock was later appointed to the Shadow Cabinet as Shadow Secretary of State for Employment Rights. Pidcock announced at the 2019 TUC that the next Labour Government would create a Ministry for Employment Rights to "bring about the biggest extension of rights for workers that our country has ever seen" to deliver better wages, greater security and give workers more of a say over how their workplaces are run.

Pidcock lost her seat at the 2019 general election. The winning candidate, Richard Holden, subsequently stated that "she represented a branch of the Labour Party that wasn't mainstream, which wasn't what people thought of as traditional Labour and that's what happened tonight". It was the first time the seat had not returned a Labour MP since its creation in 1950.

In July 2020, the Parliamentary Commissioner for Standards ordered Pidcock to repay more than £3,800 after she used Commons stationery to accuse the government of a "betrayal" over the BBC licence fee for over-75s. Pidcock had sent out more than 5,000 letters in September 2019 accusing the Conservatives of a "welfare cut". She said she used a template from a House of Commons department, but had made some changes. The Commissioner said these changes meant the letter "was no longer neutral and objective". Pidcock said it had been an "honest mistake".

=== Views ===
Pidcock identifies as a socialist, and supported the policies of party leader Jeremy Corbyn. A strong critic of the Conservative Party, she said that "I go to parliament to be a mouthpiece for my constituents and class". She stated in mid-2017 that Tories were "the enemy" and said she was "disgusted at the way they're running this country". Pidcock did not socialise with Conservative MPs and said that she had "absolutely no intention of being friends with any Tories."

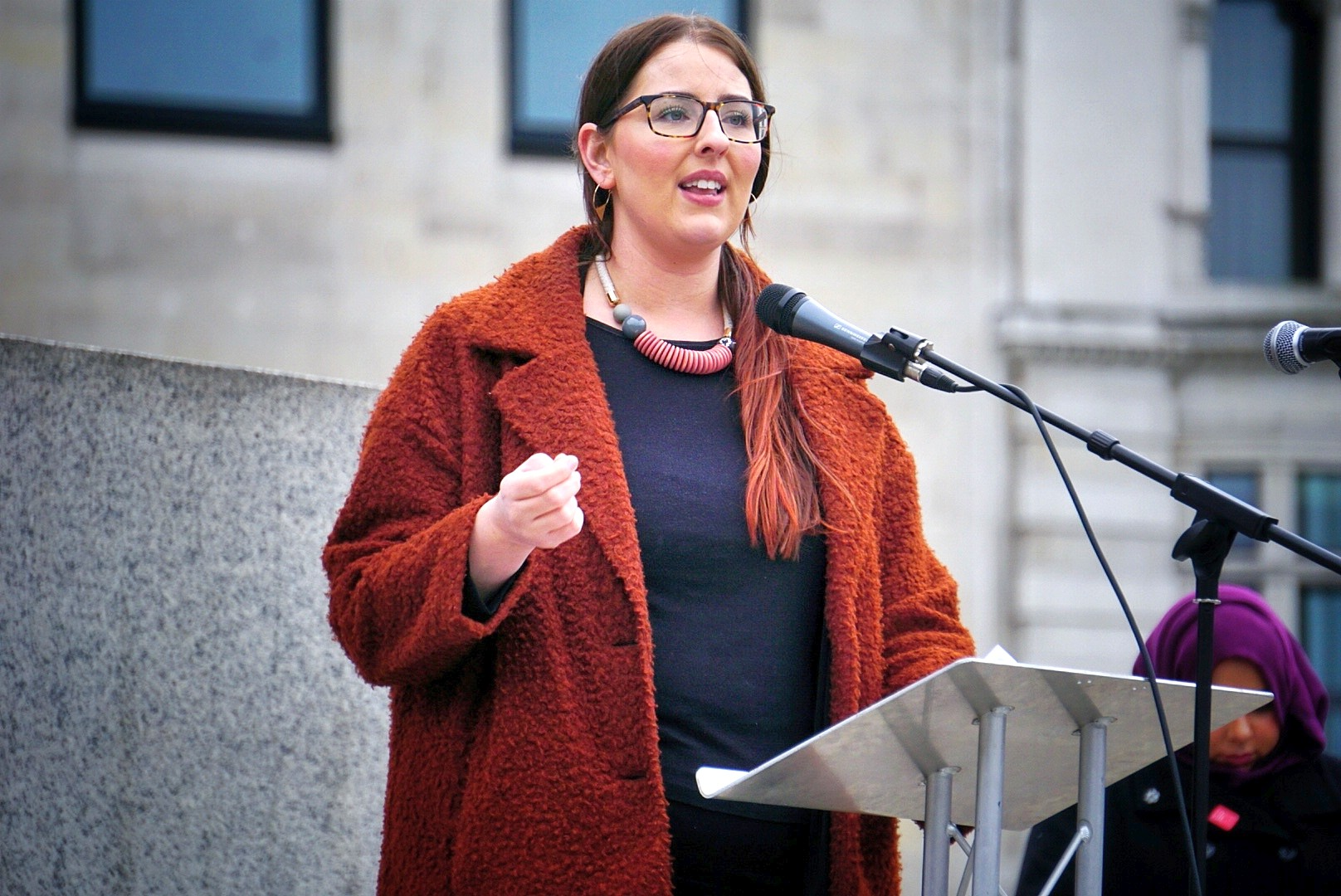
Pidcock speaking at the Britain is Broken rally in 2019

She criticised the Conservative government for doing far too little for working-class people, and said that her then constituency had suffered long-term de-industrialisation and lack of investment, leading to significant financial difficulties for many residents. She highlighted the rise in volunteer organisations to help support people who have been left behind by the state. In December 2017, in a Parliamentary question to the Prime Minister, Theresa May, Pidcock condemned delays to payments under the Universal Credit system in the period just before Christmas, "the toughest financial time" for her constituents. She asked, "Is the roll-out a matter of gross incompetence or calculated cruelty?"

She criticised the lack of proxy voting for pregnant women in Parliament, attending a vote in 2018 whilst in the late stages of pregnancy.

Pidcock described climate change as the "biggest issue facing humanity", and spoke at School Strike for Climate demonstrations.

In 2020 Torr Robinson, writing for Tribune, said that Pidcock "has alarmed many by her repeated use of transphobic dog-whistles and talking points in various articles and public appearances".

== After Parliament ==
In early 2020, she led Richard Burgon's unsuccessful campaign to be deputy leader of the Labour Party. That same year Pidcock was appointed as the National Secretary of the People's Assembly Against Austerity.

In November 2020, Pidcock was elected to the National Executive Committee of the Labour Party.

In a Labour meeting in March 2021, former Deputy Leader Margaret Beckett, who was unaware her microphone was on, called Pidcock a "silly cow". She subsequently apologised to Pidcock and said the remark was unjustifiable.

In January 2022, Pidcock resigned from the National Executive Committee of the Labour Party in the wake of the Committee's vote to not restore the Labour whip to Jeremy Corbyn and in critique of decisions taken under Keir Starmer's leadership, commenting that there was "an irreconcilable difference between the actions of the Labour Party as it stands and the principles that underpin the way I have been taught to treat people and my idea of what a political organisation should be for" and that, at multiple levels of organisation, the Party had become "hostile territory for socialists".

In March 2022, Pidcock announced that she would not seek to be reselected as the Labour candidate for North West Durham.

== Personal life ==
Pidcock's former partner is Daniel Kebede, General Secretary of the National Education Union. They have one son, born in July 2018. In June 2017, Pidcock said she would accept a council house, but there were none available. She said that she was unable to afford the deposit for her first home because of her university debt, so she was renting in the private sector. She bought a house jointly with Kebede in September 2018.

== Notes ==
Parliament of the United Kingdom
Preceded by Pat Glass	Member of Parliament for North West Durham; 2017–2019	Succeeded by Richard Holden
