= Trial of Thomas Paine =

1792 seditious libel trial in England

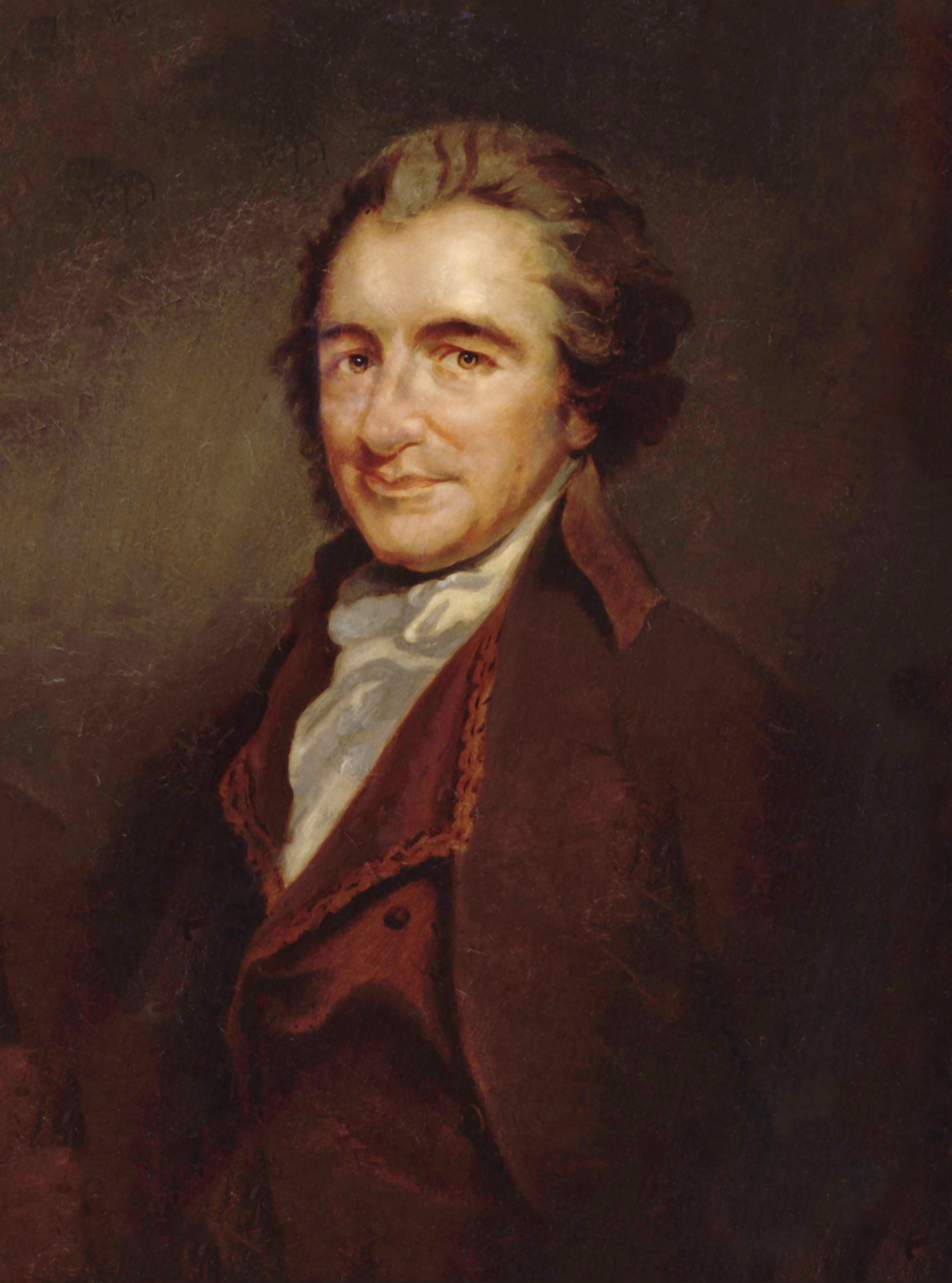
Thomas Paine, the defendant

The trial of Thomas Paine for seditious libel was held on 18 December 1792 in response to his publication of the second part of the Rights of Man. The government of William Pitt, worried by the possibility that the French Revolution might spread to England, had begun suppressing works that espoused radical philosophies.

Paine's work, which advocated the right of the people to overthrow their government, was duly targeted, with a writ for his arrest issued on 21 May. Paine fled to France in September since he had been elected a member of the National Convention in France. He was instead represented in absentia by Thomas Erskine, a noted lawyer and orator who was severely criticised by government supporters in the months leading up to the trial.

At the trial, Archibald Macdonald, representing the prosecution, argued that Paine's work served only to inflame the populace and distribute radical ideas to those without the experience to understand them in context. Erskine's reply opened with a defence of the freedom of lawyers to represent whichever clients came to them, and it followed with an exposition of his views on the nature of the freedom of the press that argued that the publication of radical tracts served only to improve the government by highlighting its weaknesses and could not be seditious if published in good faith. Despite Erskine's speech later receiving a rapturous response, Paine was found guilty before Macdonald replied.

The verdict was seen by the government as legitimising their repression of radicalism, and paved the way for the 1794 Treason Trials, in which Erskine played a prominent role.

English satirist James Gillray ridicules Paine in Paris awaiting sentence of execution from three hanging judges.

== Background ==
=== French Revolution ===
After involving itself in the Seven Years' War and the American Revolutionary War, France found itself financially ruined. Attempts to pass an economic plan to alleviate that in the Estates-General of 1789 led instead to the Third Estate forming the National Assembly. Succeeded, in turn, by the National Constituent Assembly and the Legislative Assembly, the various legislative bodies succeeded in rendering the monarchy constitutional, limited by democratic institutions. Attempts to remove the monarch entirely, although thwarted on 20 June 1792, led to the effective overthrow of Louis XVI on 10 August. On 21 October, France was formally declared a republic.

Britain was initially sympathetic to the revolutionaries of France, but the sympathy dissolved with the execution of Louis XVI and was replaced by hostility and a growing schism within the Whigs. While the Foxite branch argued for the Revolution as a source of general liberty, the administration of William Pitt became increasingly repressive, fearing the spread of Jacobinism to the United Kingdom and the overthrow of the government. The split was reflected in the behaviour of the people. While some joined societies dedicated to parliamentary reform, others formed mobs under the banner of "Church and King" and attacked the homes of liberals and those who sympathised with the French Revolution, including that of Joseph Priestley. The Association for Preserving Liberty and Property against Republicans and Levellers was formed and served as "an organised body of private agents engaged in ferreting out sedition wherever it raised its inky head".

=== Paine and the Rights of Man ===
Thomas Paine was a noted writer and political theorist whose work had influenced and helped drive the American Revolution. Having returned to England, he decided to write a book, Rights of Man, addressing the arguments of Edmund Burke, a prominent conservative strongly fearful of the French Revolution. The first part was published in 1791 and attracted no attention from Pitt's administration. The second, published on 16 February 1792, advocated, amongst other things, the right of the people to replace their government if they thought it appropriate. The work was an immediate success, selling a million-and-a-half copies, and generating public support for various reform movements. It also brought Paine to the attention of the government and made him a subject to its crackdown. While Paine was visiting an aunt in Kent, Pitt had a writ issued against J.S. Jordan, Paine's publisher, prosecuting him for seditious libel, which carried a maximum sentence of life imprisonment. Paine returned to London and began to campaign for Jordan, finding him a lawyer and agreeing to pay his legal fees. Jordan, however, pleaded guilty and turned his files over to the court. With that additional evidence, a writ was issued for Paine on 21 May, charging him with the same crime. His trial date was set for 8 June, and later rescheduled for 18 December.

Paine left England before he could be tried since he had been elected a member of the National Convention in France, tasked with writing a new constitution. He departed England on 13 September, never to return, but further infuriated the government remotely by republishing the Rights of Man and writing Letter Addressed to the Addressors of the Late Proclamation in which he defended his actions and beliefs against those who had chosen to side with the government. Paine was instead represented in absentia by Thomas Erskine, a famous lawyer and orator who served as Attorney General to the Prince of Wales. As the trial date approached, both Erskine and Paine were targeted by vicious personal attacks. Paine's writ was followed by hundreds of loyal addresses, many of which targeted him, the burning of an effigy in Exeter and the banning of the sale of any of his books in Chester. Pamphlets slandering him were widely published, and both Paine and Erskine had their personal lives dug into.

== Trial ==
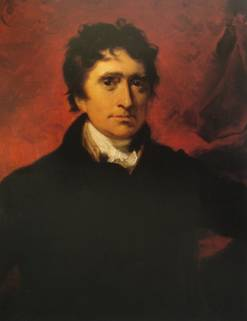
Thomas Erskine, who defended Paine.

The trial was finally held on 18 December 1792 in front of the Court of King's Bench. Lord Kenyon presided, with Erskine representing the defence, and the government represented by Archibald Macdonald, John Scott and Spencer Perceval. Macdonald opened for the prosecution, expressing outrage at the publication of the Rights of Man and his concern that it would be made available to so many members of the public who were unfamiliar with political philosophy. He also read excerpts from a letter that Paine had written to him after his arrival in Paris, which contained "everything with which to inflame a jury". He then presented various witnesses, starting with Thomas Haynes, to testify that the works had indeed been published, and following with Thomas Chapman, who had printed the first part of the Rights of Man. Chapman testified that he had intended to print the second part until he came upon a passage that "appeared of a dangerous tendency" and that, after an argument with a drunken Paine, he then returned the book.

Erskine offered no evidence, admitting that Paine had written both the Rights of Man and the letter to Macdonald and instead chose to begin speaking. He opened with a statement against those who had pressured him to refuse Paine's case and stated, in a "brilliant exposition of the principles involved", that:

I will for ever, at all hazards, assert the dignity, independence and integrity of the English Bar, without which impartial justice, the most valuable part of the English Constitution, can have no existence. From the moment that any advocate can be permitted to say that he will, or will not, stand between the Crown and the subject arraigned in the court where he daily sits to practise, from that moment the liberties of England are at an end. If the advocate refuses to defend, from what he may think of the charge or of the defence, he assumes the character of the Judge; nay, he assumes it before the hour of judgment; and in proportion to his rank and reputation, puts the heavy influence of, perhaps, a mistaken opinion into the scales against the accused, in whose favour the benevolent principle of English law makes all presumptions.

He then moved on to addressing the freedom of the press and the limits on it, arguing that freedom of speech was necessary to identify the flaws in the structure of the government and the constitution, even if the author was mistaken about the flaws. As long as a writer intended only to enlighten others, prohibiting their speech would serve only to undermine the government by harming the opportunities to improve it. While Macdonald had argued that the book was problematic because it was circulated amongst all classes of society, Erskine argued that this was not the test of whether the Rights of Man was seditious. Instead, the test was whether Paine had exclusively dealt with what he believed to be in the best interests of England, its government and its people. While Paine's opinions ran counter to the existing system of government, Erskine argued that "opinion is free and... conduct alone is amenable to the law". For a libel claim to succeed, the Libel Act 1792 (32 Geo. 3. c. 60) required the prosecution to show the publication was motivated by malice. Since Paine had intended only to help mankind, and this was a pure motive, he could not be guilty.

Despite the speech, the jury found Paine guilty before Macdonald replied to Erskine's argument.

== Aftermath ==
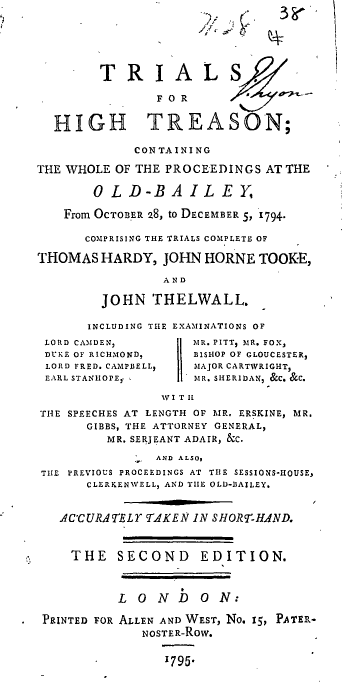
Thomas Hardy's account of the trials, 1794 Treason Trials, which were prompted by the verdict in Paine's trial

Although it failed to sway the jury, Erskine's speech was given a rapturous response. After he left the court, he was confronted by a mob that cheered him and shouted, "Damn Tom Paine, but Erskine for ever, and the Liberty of the Press; the King, the Constitution, and Erskine for ever". The crowd proceeded to unhitch the horses from his carriage and carry the carriage (with him inside) to his lodgings at Serjeant's Inn. Over 30 transcripts or reports of the trial were printed, all of which contained Erskine's speech, and many editions emphasised Erskine's name and the theme of his speech on the title pages, using it to sell copies. Other reactions were less positive; William Godwin wrote a letter to Erskine shortly after the trial arguing that his statement that individuals were free to publish works attacking or criticising the Constitution "had a considerable share in prosecuting the verdict of guilty". Paine himself found Erskine's speech and conduct during the trial disappointing, expecting him to do more to defend the principles in the Rights of Man.

Pitt's administration took the guilty verdict in Paine's trial as a sign that further prosecutions for sedition were possible and so began many. In the 17 months following the trial, 11 publishers of the Rights of Man were prosecuted, receiving prison sentences of up to four years. They acted as a prelude to the 1794 Treason Trials in which a dozen reformers were indicted for allegedly conspiring to bring about a revolution. Erskine played a prominent role in defending many of them, including Thomas Hardy, John Horne Tooke and John Thelwall, all three of whom were acquitted.

== Bibliography ==
- Ayer, A. J. (1988). Thomas Paine. University of Chicago Press. ISBN 0226033392.
- Crosby, Mark (2010). "The Voice of Flattery vs Sober Truth: William Godwin, Thomas Paine and the 1792 Trial of Thomas Paine for Sedition". The Review of English Studies. 62 (253). Oxford University Press. ISSN 1471-6968.
- Doyle, William (2003). The Oxford History of the French Revolution (2nd ed.). Oxford University Press. ISBN 019925298X.
- Fruchtman, Jack (1996). Thomas Paine: Apostle of Freedom. Basic Books. ISBN 1568580630.
- O'Gorman, Frank (2006). "The Paine Burnings of 1792–1793". Past and Present (193). Oxford University Press: 111–155. doi:10.1093/pastj/gtl010. ISSN 1477-464X.
- Hostettler, John (2010). Thomas Erskine and Trial by Jury (2nd ed.). Waterside Press. ISBN 978-9781904387.
- Kairys, David (1998). The Politics of Law: A Progressive Critique. Basic Books. ISBN 0465059597.
- Lovat-Fraser, J.A. (1909). "The Oratory of Lord Erskine". Canadian Law Times. ISSN 0381-1271.
- Pannill, William (2001). "Thomas Erskine: Lawyer for the Ages". Litigation. 27 (2). American Bar Association.
- Rea, Robert R. (1961). ""Liberty of the Press" as an Issue in English Politics, 1792–1793". The Historian. 24 (1): 26–43. doi:10.1111/j.1540-6563.1961.tb01708.x. ISSN 0018-2370.
- Stryker, Lloyd Paul (1947). For the Defence: Thomas Erskine, The Most Enlightened Liberal Of His Times, 1750–1823. Doubleday. OCLC 464757150.
- Vernon, James (1996). Re-reading the Constitution: New Narratives in the Political History of England's Long Nineteenth Century. Cambridge University Press. ISBN 052158941X.
