= 1890 Mid Durham by-election =

UK parliamentary by-election

The 1890 Mid Durham by-election was held on 17 July 1890 after the death of the incumbent Liberal-Labour MP William Crawford. The seat was retained by the Liberal-Labour candidate John Wilson.

Mid Durham by-election, 1890
Party	Candidate	Votes	%	±%
Lib-Lab	John Wilson	5,469	61.8	N/A
Conservative	A Vane-Tempest	3,375	38.2	New
Majority		2,094	22.6	N/A
Turnout		8,844	77.8	N/A
Lib-Lab hold		Swing	N/A	
