= Paul Corrigan (political adviser) =

British political adviser (born 1938)

Paul David Corrigan
- Born: 11 April 1948 (age 78); London, England
- Education: London School of Economics; University of Durham
- Political party: Labour

Paul David Corrigan CBE (born 11 April 1948) was Director of Strategy and Commissioning of the NHS London strategic health authority and formerly Labour Party adviser, health adviser to Tony Blair and academic. He is married to former government chief Chief Whip Baroness Hilary Armstrong.

Born in Woolwich, he gained his BSc in sociology, London School of Economics in 1969; PhD in juvenile delinquency and secondary education, University of Durham, 1974 and has been Visiting Professor of public policy at the University of North London since 1995. He taught at University of Warwick then as Head of Department of applied social studies at Polytechnic of North London. He taught, researched and wrote about inner city social policy and community development. He gave papers at the 6th and 11th Symposia of the National Deviancy Conference on 'Interactionist Theory and Social Work' and 'The Industrial Relations Act: A Suitable Case for Deviance?' respectively.

At the 1979 general election, he was the Communist Party candidate for Coventry North East.

In 1985 he left academic life and worked with the Greater London Council and Inner London Education Authority until they were abolished by the Thatcher government then later with the London Borough of Islington and for the local government unit of the Labour party. In 1997 he started to work as a consultant on issues of modernisation. In 1999 he started to work for the Office for Public Management and published "Shakespeare on Management: Leadership Lessons for Today's Managers".

In 2001 he was appointed as a special advisor to Secretary of State for Health Alan Milburn. He served as special advisor to Milburn's successor, Dr John Reid. Corrigan is credited as the man behind the Labour government's policy on foundation hospitals and has written widely about the principle of choice. In 2006, Corrigan returned to the government as a policy adviser to the prime minister. In 2007 he announced that he was going to work for the National Health Service in London. He was the Director of Strategy and Commissioning of the NHS London strategic health authority from June 2007 to March 2009.

Corrigan has advocated privatisation of NHS hospitals that face financial difficulties.

Corrigan was appointed Commander of the Order of the British Empire (CBE) in the 2009 Birthday Honours.

He became a non-executive director of the Care Quality Commission in July 2013.

Corrigan was appointed by Health Secretary Wes Streeting to the Department of Health and Social Care in July 2024 to help develop an NHS reform package for the newly elected Labour Government.
