= Ernest Armstrong (British politician) =

British politician

Member of Parliament for North West Durham
- In office 15 October 1964 – 18 May 1987
- Preceded by: William Ainsley
- Succeeded by: Hilary Armstrong

Personal details
- Born: 12 January 1915
- Died: 8 July 1996 (aged 81)
- Party: Labour
- Children: Hilary
- Education: Wolsingham Grammar School

Ernest Armstrong (12 January 1915 – 8 July 1996) was a British Labour Party politician.

== Life ==
Armstrong was educated at Wolsingham Grammar School and City of Leeds Teacher Training College, and ultimately became a headmaster. He served as a councillor on Sunderland Borough Council and chaired its education committee.

Defeated by the Conservative incumbent in Sunderland South in the 1955 and 1959 General Elections, Armstrong was Member of Parliament (MP) for North West Durham from 1964 until his retirement in 1987. His daughter, Hilary Armstrong, was his successor.

Armstrong served as a parliamentary private secretary (PPS) from 1965, and a Labour whip, and junior minister for Education and Science (1974–1975) and the Environment (1975–1979).

Armstrong was a Methodist local preacher and served as vice-president of the Methodist Conference in 1974.

After Labour lost the 1979 general election, he served as a Deputy Speaker.

After his retirement, Armstrong acted as political adviser to the BBC's production of the political drama House of Cards.

Parliament of the United Kingdom
Preceded by William Ainsley	Member of Parliament for North West Durham; 1964 – 1987	Succeeded by Hilary Armstrong
