= Llewellyn Atherley-Jones =

British politician

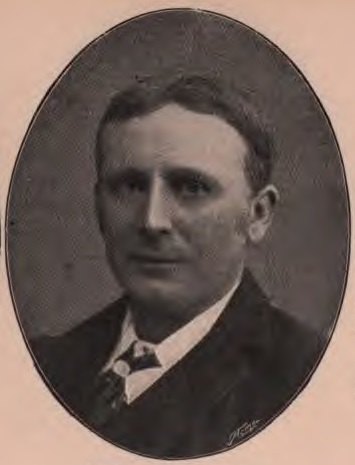
Atherley-Jones c1895

Atherley-Jones c1900

Atherley-Jones c1910

Llewellyn Archer Atherley-Jones QC (1851 – 15 June 1929) was a radical British Liberal Party politician and Barrister who eventually became a judge.

== Background ==
Atherley-Jones was the son of Ernest Jones, a prominent Chartist leader who was also a Barrister (who adopted a hyphenated surname to include his mother's maiden name) and Jane Barfield of Cumberland. He was educated at Manchester Grammar School, followed by Brasenose College, Oxford. He married, in 1876, Elizabeth Fanny Lambert, of Durham who died in 1927; they had one son.

== Early legal career ==
He read for the Bar at the Inner Temple and was called to the bar in 1875 and joined the North Eastern Circuit where he was initially involved in criminal defence work. He was also taken on as the Barrister for the Miners' National Union, and represented the miners at an inquiry into a mining accident (an underground explosion) at Seaham, County Durham in 1880. He was appointed Recorder of Newcastle in 1905. He served as a Justice of the Peace in Berkshire.

== Politics ==
North West Durham within northern Durham, showing boundaries used in 1885–1914

Sharing his father's radical politics, Atherley-Jones became Hon. Secretary of the Westminster Committee which supported William Ewart Gladstone on the question of the Bulgarian atrocities. He was committed to the left wing of the Liberal Party, although in 1881 he declined an invitation to fight a by-election in Leeds against Herbert Gladstone, son of the Liberal leader. He was chosen as candidate for Ealing in 1884, but as the election approached, had a much better offer from North West Durham which was an area with a large number of miners and where a Liberal victory was much more likely. He was duly selected at the beginning of August 1885 and won the seat with 62% of the vote in the general election in November. Perhaps his greatest contribution to the Liberal Party, however, was his description of New Liberalism, encouraging the Party to embrace the politics of mass working-class appeal, rather than being sidetracked by peripheral concerns. At his eighth and last General Election contest, in December 1910, he was comfortably re-elected again;

General election December 1910 Electorate 18,361
Party	Candidate	Votes	%	±%
Liberal	Llewellyn Atherley-Jones	8,998	65.1	
Conservative	James Ogden Hardicker	4,827	34.9	
Majority		4.171	30.2	
Turnout			75.3	
Liberal hold		Swing		

In 1913 he resigned his seat as he was appointed a Judge of the City of London Court.

== Judge ==
From 1913 onwards, he devoted the rest of his career to the judiciary. As a judge at the Old Bailey in the 1920s, he acquired a reputation for dealing sympathetically with men charged with consensual homosexual offences.

== Publications ==
- Miners' Manual, 1882
- The Miners' Handbook to the Coal Mines Regulation Act, 1887
- articles in The Nineteenth Century, Edinburgh Review, and other reviews on social and political questions
- The Fall of Lord Paddockslea, and other novels published anonymously
- Commerce in War: a Treatise on International Law
- The Law of Children and Young Persons
- Looking Back, 1925
- a frequent correspondent of The Times

Parliament of the United Kingdom
New constituency	Member of Parliament for North West Durham; 1885–1914	Succeeded by Aneurin Williams
