= William Ainsley =

British coal miner and politician

John William Ainsley (30 June 1898 – 23 June 1976) was a British coal miner and Labour Party politician. He was the Member of Parliament for North West Durham from 1955 to 1964.

== Working life ==
Ainsley was born on 30 June 1898, the son of John George Ainsley. Ainsley attended elementary school before enlisting in the Durham Light Infantry in 1916 to fight in the First World War. When he returned, he became a coal miner. He continued his education at evening classes and through correspondence courses.

== Local politics ==
Ainsley joined the Labour Party and helped the party by acting as the agent running election campaigns. In 1942 he was appointed to Durham County Council (elections having been suspended during the war), where he specialised in education and became Chairman of the Education Committee; served on the council until 1956, including a term as Chair from 1953 to 1955, and as Alderman the following year. In December 1950 he was part of a delegation to central government over Durham County Council's decision to institute a closed shop for all its employees. He was vice-chairman of the County Council in 1952 and Chairman from 1953 to 1955. He was Chairman of the Northern Advisory Council for Further Education from 1951.

== Parliament ==
For the 1955 general election, Ainsley was selected as Labour Party candidate for North West Durham. He supported the mining industry, calling for more investment in British mines rather than importing coal from Rhodesia. He was a supporter of nationalisation who opposed an attempt in 1957 to water down party policy. He defended his old regiment from attempts to merge it.

An active Methodist who was a local preacher, Ainsley served in the Methodist Youth department. He was generally loyal to the Labour Party (never breaking the whip), and when asked in 1959, he withdrew his name from a motion which opposed any move of NATO aircraft from French to British bases. In 1960 he called for a rise in the school leaving age to 16, and in 1961 he urged integration of the independent schools with the state system and fully comprehensive mixed-sex schools.

== Retirement ==
Ainsley stood down at the 1964 general election.

== Sources ==
- Stenton, M., Lees, S. (1981). Who's Who of British Members of Parliament, volume iv (covering 1945-1979). Sussex: The Harvester Press; New Jersey: Humanities Press. ISBN 0-391-01087-5
- "Who Was Who" A & C Black

Parliament of the United Kingdom
Preceded by James Murray	Member of Parliament for North West Durham; 1955–1964	Succeeded by Ernest Armstrong
