= Jim'll Paint It =

Humorous blog featuring surreal artwork

- Available in: English
- Website: jimllpaintit.tumblr.com
- Launched: 21 February 2013; 13 years ago
- Current status: Active

Jim'll Paint It is an internet blog featured on Tumblr and other social networking sites, started on 21 February 2013. The blog consists of mostly humorous and surreal artwork painted using only Microsoft Paint, by request from his online followers. Jim'll Paint It has produced over 100 paintings since 2013. The first piece featured dinosaurs painting people in an art class. The title is an allusion to the BBC TV series Jim'll Fix It.

== Background ==
Jim'll Paint It is a speed painter from Bristol, England. The only tools he uses for his works are Paint XP and an optical mouse. In October 2014, he published a book on his works, with 17 paintings made especially for the book. In February 2015, he began a new blog called 30squared.

== See also ==
- Digital painting
- Surrealism
