= 1942 Spennymoor by-election =

UK parliamentary by-election

The 1942 Spennymoor by-election was a parliamentary by-election held on 21 July 1942 for the British House of Commons constituency of Spennymoor in County Durham.

The seat had become vacant when the Labour Member of Parliament (MP) Joseph Batey had resigned from the House of Commons on 6 July 1942, by the procedural device of accepting the post of Steward of the Manor of Northstead. Batey had held the seat since the 1922 general election.

== Candidates ==
The Labour Party selected as its candidate the 54-year-old James Dixon Murray.

The parties in the war-time Coalition Government had agreed not to contest vacancies in seats held by other coalition parties, but other by-elections had been contested by independent candidates or those from minor parties. (The most recent was Maldon in June 1940, where an independent Labour candidate won what had previously been a safe seat for the Conservatives).

== Result ==
No other candidates were nominated in Spennymoor, so Murray was returned unopposed. He held the Spennymoor seat until the constituency's abolition for the 1950 general election.

Spennymoor by-election, 21 July 1942
Party	Candidate	Votes	%	±%
Labour	James Murray	Unopposed	N/A	N/A
Labour hold				

== See also ==
- Spennymoor constituency
- Spennymoor
- Lists of United Kingdom by-elections
