= John Wilson (Mid Durham MP) =

British politician

John Wilson c1895

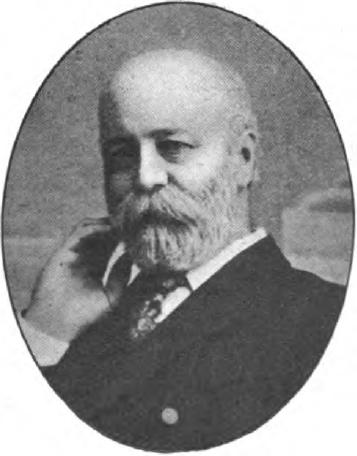
John Wilson c1900

John Wilson c1906

John Wilson MP (1837 – 24 March 1915) was an English coal miner, trade unionist, and a Liberal Member of Parliament (MP) for more than 25 years.

== Early life ==
Born at Greatham, near Hartlepool, his mother Hannah died when he was four. After his father, Christopher (b. 1807 at Greatham), died of cholera when Wilson was ten, he worked in the mines, spent four years as a merchant seaman, and return to Durham as a miner in 1860. Married in 1832 to Margaret (née Firth), the couple emigrated to the United States in 1864, where Wilson worked the mines in Pennsylvania and Illinois. They returned to Durham in 1867; the first two of their five children had been born in America.

Wilson was one of the founders in 1869 of the Durham Miners' Association (DMA), which led to him being denied employment, but in 1878 he became a full-time union organiser, rising to become the DMA's general secretary in 1896.

== Political career ==
The Reform Act 1867 had extended the vote to working-class men in urban areas, allowing the election in 1874 of Thomas Burt and Alexander Macdonald as Liberal–Labour Members of Parliament (MPs).

The Representation of the People Act 1884 extended the same qualifications to the county constituencies, enfranchising many miners for the first time. Wilson was elected at the 1885 general election as Liberal–Labour MP for the new Houghton-le-Spring constituency, but lost his seat when the Liberal Party split at the 1886 general election over Irish Home Rule.

He returned to House of Commons in 1890, at a by-election for the Mid Durham constituency following the death of William Crawford, a Liberal-Labour MP who was also Secretary of the Durham Miners' Association.

In Parliament, Wilson impressed as an effective speaker. However, he followed a different political path to many of his mining colleagues. The Liberal–Labour movement had consisted of local electoral pacts between trades unions and the Liberal Party, whereby trade union-sponsored MPs (who received no salary) were politically allied to the Liberal Party, but the movement declined after 1885. The formation in 1893 of the socialist Independent Labour Party was followed in 1900 by the Labour Representation Committee, which in 1906 changed its name to the Labour Party. The Labour movement no longer depended on the Liberal Party, and the alliance was formally broken when the MPs sponsored by the Miners' Federation of Great Britain joined the Labour Party before the January 1910 general election.

However, some MPs, including Wilson did not join the Labour Party. A primitive methodist, he was a Liberal by conviction rather than by convenience, an admirer of Gladstone who believed in free trade when much of the rest of the Labour movement was following a socialist path.

== Publications ==
- Wilson, John (1910). "10". Memories of a Labour Leader: The Autobiography of John Wilson, J.P., M.P. London: T. F. Unwin. British Library shelfmark 10855.df.19. Archived from the original on 28 September 2007. "…at that time there was one law for the employer and another for the workman. It was criminal for a workman to do that which his employer could do with impunity. He could arrange with his colleagues to reduce wages, and lock men out if the terms were not accepted, and turn them into the street to compel acceptance. There was no law to interfere with him. Let the workman want a higher price for his labour, he was liable to find the machinery of the law ranged against him, and there was a class connection, if not an open compact, between the magistracy and employers."

Parliament of the United Kingdom
New constituency	Member of Parliament for Houghton-le-Spring; 1885 – 1886	Succeeded by Nicholas Wood
Preceded by William Crawford	Member of Parliament for Mid Durham; 1890 – 1915	Succeeded by Samuel Galbraith
Trade union offices
Preceded by James Millar Jack and Thomas Sharples	Auditor of the Trades Union Congress; 1884; With: Thomas Ashton	Succeeded by Joseph Hope and George Davy Kelley
Preceded by William Crawford	Secretary of the Miners' National Union; 1890–1898	Succeeded by Position abolished
Preceded by Edward Harford	Chairman of the Parliamentary Committee of the Trades Union Congress; 1891	Succeeded by Havelock Wilson
Preceded by William Hammond Patterson	General Secretary of the Durham Miners' Association; 1896–1915	Succeeded by Thomas Cann
