= James Wolfe Murray (cricketer) =

Scottish cricketer

Personal information
- Full name: James Archibald Wolfe Murray
- Born: 21 April 1936; Edinburgh, Midlothian, Scotland
- Died: 5 June 2011 (aged 75); Melrose, Roxburghshire, Scotland
- Batting: Right-handed
- Bowling: Right-arm fast-medium
- Relatives: Lord Dunglass (father-in-law)

Domestic team information
- Years: Team
- 1957: Oxford University

Career statistics
Competition	First-class
Matches	3
Runs scored	43
Batting average	14.33
100s/50s	–/–
Top score	25
Balls bowled	252
Wickets	3
Bowling average	51.66
5 wickets in innings	–
10 wickets in match	–
Best bowling	1/20
Catches/stumpings	3/–
- Source: Cricinfo, 1 June 2020

James Archibald Wolfe Murray (25 April 1936 – 5 June 2011) was a Scottish first-class cricketer.

The son of Major Malcolm Victor Alexander Wolfe Murray and Lady Grizel Mary Boyle, he was born at Edinburgh in April 1936. He was educated at Eton College, before going up to Worcester College, Oxford. While studying at Oxford, he made three appearances in first-class cricket for Oxford University in 1957 against Worcestershire, the Free Foresters and Leicestershire. He scored 43 runs in his three matches, with a high score of 25. With his right-arm fast-medium bowling, he took 3 wickets.

He later married Lady Diana Lucy Douglas-Home in June 1968, four months before her father Alec Douglas-Home became Prime Minister of the United Kingdom. The couple had three children before their divorce in 1976. He married Amanda Felicity Street two years later in 1978. Wolfe Murray died at the Borders General Hospital in Melrose in June 2011. His great-grandfather was the British Army officer James Wolfe Murray.
