= James Murray (luger) =

American luger (born 1946)

Personal information
- Born: 20 November 1946 (age 79) Helena, Montana, United States

Sport
- Sport: Luge

James Murray (born November 20, 1946) is an American luger. He competed at the 1968 Winter Olympics, the 1972 Winter Olympics and the 1976 Winter Olympics. He practiced luging while attending the University of Montana. He served in the military in both Germany and Vietnam. He was also a teacher, ski instructor, and real estate broker.
