= Spennymoor (constituency) =

Parliamentary constituency in the United Kingdom, 1918–1950

- Former county constituency for the House of Commons

1918–1950
- Seats: one
- Created from: Mid Durham and Bishop Auckland
- Replaced by: Durham and North West Durham

Spennymoor was a county constituency centred on the town of Spennymoor in County Durham. It returned one Member of Parliament (MP) to the House of Commons of the Parliament of the United Kingdom, elected by the first past the post system from 1918 to 1950.

== History ==
Spennymoor was created under the Representation of the People Act 1918 for the 1918 general election, comprising southern parts of the abolished Mid Division of Durham, including the communities of Brandon, Brancepeth, Tudhoe and Willington. Spennymoor was added from Bishop Auckland and Crook and Tow Law from Barnard Castle.

It was abolished for the 1950 general election under the Representation of the People Act 1948, with the bulk of the constituency being included in the re-established constituency of North West Durham, with the exception of the town of Spennymoor itself, which was transferred to Durham.

== Boundaries ==
- The Urban Districts of Brandon and Byshottles, Crook, Spennymoor, Tow Law, and Willington;
- in the Rural District of Auckland the parishes of Helmington Row, Hunwick and Helmington, and North Bedburn;
- the parish of Brancepeth in the Rural District of Durham; and
- the parish of Hedleyhope in the Rural District of Lanchester.

== Members of Parliament ==
Year	Member	Party
1918	Samuel Galbraith	Liberal
1922	Joseph Batey	Labour
1942	James Murray	Labour
1950	constituency abolished	

== Election results ==
=== Elections in the 1910s ===
General election 1918: Spennymoor
Party	Candidate	Votes	%	±%
Liberal	*Samuel Galbraith	9,443	53.5	
Labour	Joseph Batey	8,196	46.5	
Majority		1,247	7.0	
Turnout		17,639	55.8	
Registered electors		31,617		
Liberal win (new seat)				

- Galbraith was sponsored by the Durham Miners' Association

=== Elections in the 1920s ===
General election 1922: Spennymoor
Party	Candidate	Votes	%	±%
Labour	Joseph Batey	13,766	50.3	+3.8
Unionist	Robert Anthony Eden	7,567	27.6	New
Liberal	Thomas Edward Wing	6,046	22.1	−31.4
Majority		6,199	22.7	N/A
Turnout		27,379	81.2	+25.4
Registered electors		33,710		
Labour gain from Liberal		Swing	+17.6	

General election 1923: Spennymoor
Party	Candidate	Votes	%	±%
Labour	Joseph Batey	15,567	65.7	+15.4
Unionist	William Appleby	8,116	34.3	+6.7
Majority		7,451	31.4	+8.7
Turnout		23,683	69.7	−11.5
Registered electors		33,962		
Labour hold		Swing	+4.3	

General election 1924: Spennymoor
Party	Candidate	Votes	%	±%
Labour	Joseph Batey	17,211	63.0	−2.7
Unionist	Herbert Conyers Surtees	10,101	37.0	+2.7
Majority		7,110	26.0	−5.4
Turnout		27,312	78.3	+8.6
Registered electors		34,865		
Labour hold		Swing	−2.7	

General election 1929: Spennymoor
Party	Candidate	Votes	%	±%
Labour	Joseph Batey	20,858	71.8	+8.8
Unionist	Francis Page Gourlay	8,202	28.2	−8.8
Majority		12,656	43.6	+17.6
Turnout		29,060	72.7	−5.6
Registered electors		39,961		
Labour hold		Swing	+8.8	

=== Elections in the 1930s ===
General election 1931: Spennymoor
Party	Candidate	Votes	%	±%
Labour	Joseph Batey	18,072	56.22	
Conservative	Michael Dodds McCarthy	14,072	43.78	
Majority		4,000	12.44	
Turnout		32,144	79.42	
Labour hold		Swing		

General election 1935: Spennymoor
Party	Candidate	Votes	%	±%
Labour	Joseph Batey	21,473	71.18	
Conservative	Michael Dodds McCarthy	8,696	28.82	
Majority		12,777	42.36	
Turnout		30,169	74.37	
Labour hold		Swing		

=== Elections in the 1940s ===
General Election 1939–40:

Another General Election was required to take place before the end of 1940. The political parties had been making preparations for an election to take place from 1939 and by the end of this year, the following candidates had been selected;

- Labour: Joseph Batey
- Conservative:

1942 Spennymoor by-election
Party	Candidate	Votes	%	±%
Labour	James Dixon Murray	Unopposed	N/A	N/A
Labour hold				

General election 1945: Spennymoor
Party	Candidate	Votes	%	±%
Labour	James Dixon Murray	22,587	69.89	
Conservative	Frank Douglas Nicholson	7,510	23.24	
Independent	Charles Joseph French Savill	2,222	6.88	New
Majority		15,077	46.65	
Turnout		32,319	79.76	
Labour hold		Swing		

== See also ==
- History of parliamentary constituencies and boundaries in Durham
