= North West Durham =

Parliamentary constituency in the United Kingdom

- Former county constituency for the House of Commons
- 2010–2024 boundary of North West Durham in County Durham

- Location of County Durham within England
- County: County Durham
- Electorate: 72,760 (December 2010)
- Major settlements: Consett, Crook, Lanchester and Willington

1950–2024
- Seats: One
- Created from: Barnard Castle, Consett, and Spennymoor
- Replaced by: Blaydon and Consett; Bishop Auckland (part); City of Durham (minor part); North Durham (minor part)

1885–1918
- Seats: One
- Type of constituency: County constituency
- Created from: South Durham; North Durham
- Replaced by: Consett and Barnard Castle

North West Durham was a constituency (Note: A county constituency (for the purposes of election expenses and type of returning officer)) represented in the House of Commons of the UK Parliament.

The seat was abolished for the 2024 general election and became parts of four other constituencies: Blaydon and Consett, City of Durham (constituency), Bishop Auckland (constituency) and North Durham.

== Constituency profile ==
The constituency was in the northwest of County Durham, in the North East England region. It consisted of the western part of the former Derwentside district (including Consett and Lanchester) and the northern part of the former Wear Valley district (including Weardale, Crook, and Willington).

The majority of the electorate lived in former mining or steel towns, where Labour traditionally have polled higher than other parties, with the remainder being in rural farms and villages throughout valleys cleft from the eastern, rocky part of the Pennines.

== History ==
=== 1885–1918 ===
The constituency was first created for the 1885 general election by the Redistribution of Seats Act 1885 as one of eight new single-member divisions of the county of Durham, replacing the two 2-member seats of North Durham and South Durham. It was centred on two main communities, Consett and Lanchester.

It was abolished in 1918 with the creation of Consett as a separate constituency. Lanchester was transferred to an enlarged Barnard Castle seat and Tanfield was added to the new constituency of Blaydon.

=== 1950–2024 ===
On its recreation under the Representation of the People Act 1948, North-West Durham absorbed the abolished Spennymoor seat, with the exception of the town of Spennymoor itself (which was added in 1974). It also regained Lanchester, together with Weardale, from the now abolished Barnard Castle.

As a result of the periodic review of parliamentary constituencies following the re-organisation of local government under the Local Government Act 1972, the seat underwent a major redistribution for the 1983 general election: the town of Consett was regained from the abolished constituency thereof, and Brandon and Spennymoor were transferred to City of Durham and Sedgefield respectively. The boundaries were now similar to the first version of the constituency.

== Boundaries ==
Map of boundaries 2010-2024

=== 1885–1918 ===
- The Sessional Division of Lanchester and Consett; and
- the Parishes of Edmondbyers and Hunstanworth

See map on Vision of Britain website. (NB Boundary Commission proposed name was "Lanchester")

=== 1950–1974 ===
- The Urban Districts of Brandon and Byshottles, Crook and Willington, and Tow Law; and
- the Rural Districts of Lanchester and Weardale.

=== 1974–1983 ===
- The Urban Districts of Brandon and Byshottles, Crook and Willington, Spennymoor, and Tow Law;
- the Rural Districts of Lanchester and Weardale; and
- the parish of Brancepeth in the Rural District of Durham.

Spennymoor transferred from Durham with the parish of Brancepeth.

=== 1983–1997 ===
- The District of Derwentside wards of Benfieldside, Blackhill, Burnhope, Castleside, Consett North, Consett South, Cornsay, Crookhall, Delves Lane, Ebchester and Medomsley, Esh, Lanchester, and Leadgate; and
- the District of Wear Valley wards of Crook North, Crook South, Howden, Hunwick, St John's Chapel, Stanhope, Stanley, Tow Law, Wheatbottom and Helmington Row, Willington East, Willington West, and Wolsingham.

Gained area comprising former urban district of Consett (incorporating Benfieldside, Consett and Leadgate). Brandon and Byshottles, and Brancepeth transferred to City of Durham, and Spennymoor to Sedgefield.

=== 1997–2010 ===
- The District of Derwentside wards of Benfieldside, Blackhill, Burnhope, Burnopfield, Castleside, Consett North, Consett South, Cornsay, Crookhall, Delves Lane, Dipton, Ebchester and Medomsley, Esh, Lanchester, and Leadgate; and
- the District of Wear Valley wards of Crook North, Crook South, Howden, Hunwick, St John's Chapel, Stanhope, Stanley, Tow Law, Wheatbottom and Helmington Row, Willington East, Willington West, and Wolsingham.

The Derwentside District wards of Burnopfield and Dipton transferred from North Durham.

=== 2010–2024 ===
- The District of Derwentside wards of Benfieldside, Blackhill, Burnhope, Burnopfield, Castleside, Consett East, Consett North, Consett South, Cornsay, Delves Lane, Dipton, Ebchester and Medomsley, Esh, Lanchester, and Leadgate; and
- the District of Wear Valley wards of Crook North, Crook South, Howden, Hunwick, St John's Chapel, Stanhope, Tow Law and Stanley, Wheatbottom and Helmington Row, Willington Central, Willington West End, Wolsingham, and Witton-le-Wear.

The 1997 boundaries were retained despite the official description of the constituency changing slightly in terms of the names of the local authority wards.

In the 2009 structural changes to local government in England, the local authority districts in Durham were abolished and replaced with a single unitary authority; however, this did not affect the boundaries of the constituency.

== Abolition ==
Further to the completion of the 2023 review of Westminster constituencies, the seat was abolished for the 2024 general election, with its contents distributed four ways:

- Northern-most parts, including Consett and Leadgate, comprising just under half the electorate, to the new constituency of Blaydon and Consett
- Crook, Tow Law and Weardale to Bishop Auckland
- Esh, Willington and Hunwick to City of Durham
- Lanchester to North Durham

== Political history ==
=== 1885–1918 ===
During the first creation, Liberals represented the area and the first member until 1914 was the son of a prominent Chartist, Ernest Jones, who helped to promote New Liberalism, encouraging the Liberal Party to take on instead the politics of "mass working-class" appeal. This politics was epitomised by David Lloyd George whose People's Budget in 1909 led to the supremacy of the House of Commons over the House of Lords in 1911, national pensions under a basic welfare state (but without a National Health Service).

=== 1950–2024 ===
From its recreation in 1950 until December 2019, the seat had been represented in Westminster by members of the Labour Party. For many years the area gave large majorities suggesting a safe seat for Labour.

Both the future Conservative Party leader and Prime Minister, Theresa May, and the future Liberal Democrat leader, Tim Farron, were candidates for their respective parties at this seat for the 1992 general election, which both of them lost to incumbent Labour MP Hilary Armstrong.

In 2016 the incumbent MP, Pat Glass, announced her intention to step down at the 2017 general election in the wake of the Brexit referendum. Her successor Laura Pidcock, a close supporter of party leader Jeremy Corbyn, lost the seat in the 2019 general election to Richard Holden, as part of the Conservative Party's strategy to target seats in the so-called red wall.

== Members of Parliament ==
=== MPs 1885–1918 ===
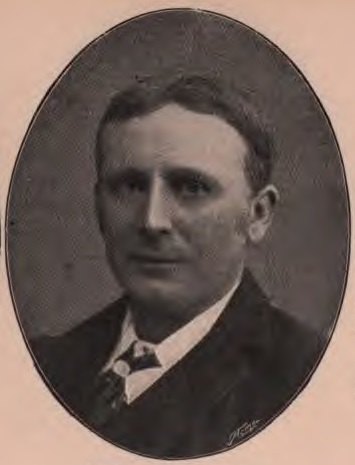
Atherley-Jones

Election	Member	Party
1885	Llewellyn Atherley-Jones	Liberal
1914	Aneurin Williams	Liberal
1918	Constituency abolished	

=== MPs 1950–2024 ===
Election	Member	Party
1950	Constituency recreated	
1950	James Murray	Labour
1955	William Ainsley	Labour
1964	Ernest Armstrong	Labour
1987	Hilary Armstrong	Labour
2010	Pat Glass	Labour
2017	Laura Pidcock	Labour
2019	Richard Holden	Conservative
2024	Constituency abolished	

== Election results 1885–1918 ==
=== Elections in the 1880s ===
General election 1885: North West Durham
Party	Candidate	Votes	%	±%
Liberal	Llewellyn Atherley-Jones	5,081	62.2	
Conservative	Arthur Bootle-Wilbraham	3,085	37.8	
Majority		1,996	24.4	
Turnout		8,166	85.6	
Registered electors		9,543		
Liberal win (new seat)				

General election 1886: North West Durham
Party	Candidate	Votes	%	±%
Liberal	Llewellyn Atherley-Jones	Unopposed		
Liberal hold				

=== Elections in the 1890s ===
General election 1892: North West Durham
Party	Candidate	Votes	%	±%
Liberal	Llewellyn Atherley-Jones	5,121	63.9	N/A
Liberal Unionist	John D Dunville	2,891	36.1	New
Majority		2,230	27.8	N/A
Turnout		8,012	77.6	N/A
Registered electors		10,330		
Liberal hold		Swing	N/A	

General election 1895: North West Durham
Party	Candidate	Votes	%	±%
Liberal	Llewellyn Atherley-Jones	5,428	58.4	−5.5
Conservative	J. Joicey	3,869	41.6	+5.5
Majority		1,559	16.8	−11.0
Turnout		9,297	81.9	+4.3
Registered electors		11,346		
Liberal hold		Swing	−5.5	

=== Elections in the 1900s ===
General election 1900: North West Durham
Party	Candidate	Votes	%	±%
Liberal	Llewellyn Atherley-Jones	5,158	50.1	−8.3
Conservative	J. Joicey	5,137	49.9	+8.3
Majority		21	0.2	−16.6
Turnout		10,295	75.0	−6.9
Registered electors		13,725		
Liberal hold		Swing	−8.3	

General election 1906: North West Durham
Party	Candidate	Votes	%	±%
Liberal	Llewellyn Atherley-Jones	9,146	69.6	+19.5
Conservative	Robert Filmer	3,999	30.4	−19.5
Majority		5,147	39.2	+39.0
Turnout		13,145	80.2	+5.2
Registered electors		16,384		
Liberal hold		Swing	+19.5	

=== Elections in the 1910s ===
Aneurin Williams

General election January 1910: North West Durham
Party	Candidate	Votes	%	±%
Liberal	Llewellyn Atherley-Jones	10,497	66.8	−2.8
Conservative	J.L. Knott	5,227	33.2	+2.8
Majority		5,270	33.6	−5.6
Turnout		15,724	85.6	+5.4
Registered electors		18,361		
Liberal hold		Swing	−2.8	

Atherley-Jones

General election December 1910: North West Durham
Party	Candidate	Votes	%	±%
Liberal	Llewellyn Atherley-Jones	8,998	65.1	−1.7
Conservative	James Ogden Hardicker	4,827	34.9	+1.7
Majority		4,171	30.2	−3.4
Turnout		13,825	75.3	−10.3
Registered electors		18,361		
Liberal hold		Swing	−1.7	

1914 North West Durham by-election
Party	Candidate	Votes	%	±%
Liberal	Aneurin Williams	7,241	40.6	−24.5
Unionist	James Ogden Hardicker	5,564	31.2	−3.7
Labour	G. H. Stuart-Bunning	5,026	28.2	New
Majority		1,677	9.4	−20.8
Turnout		17,831	88.1	+12.8
Registered electors		20,233		
Liberal hold		Swing	−10.4	

== Election results 1950–2019 ==
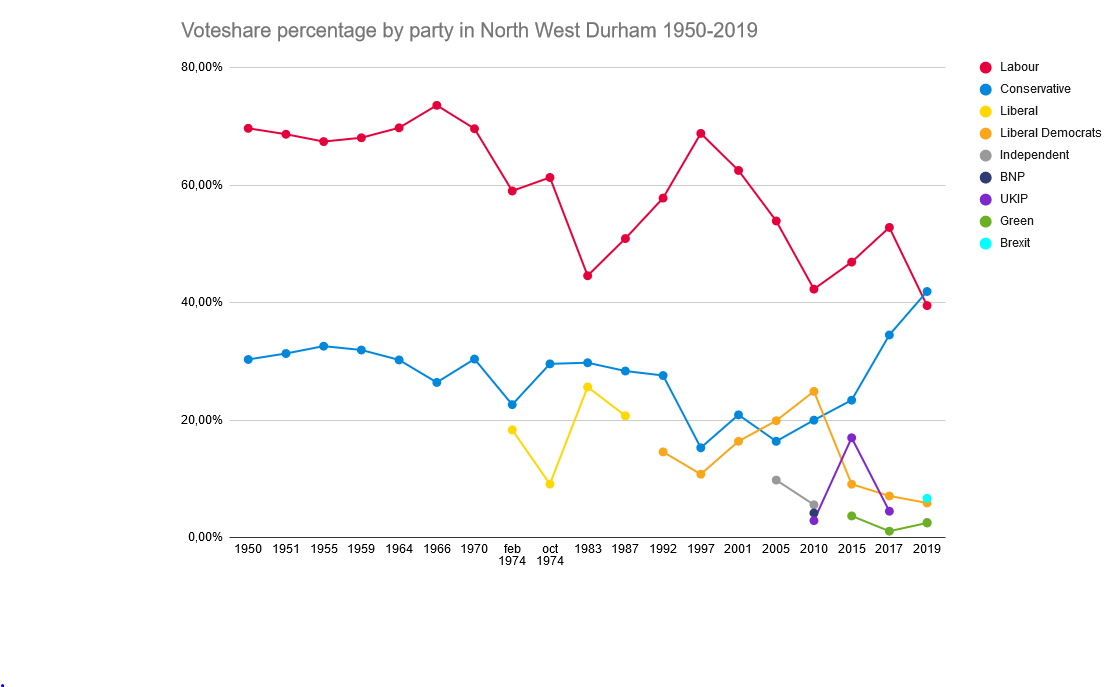

=== Elections in the 1950s ===
General election 1950: North West Durham
Party	Candidate	Votes	%	±%
Labour	James Murray	31,084	69.67	
Conservative	James Quigley	13,530	30.33	
Majority		17,554	39.34	
Turnout		44,614	86.52	
Labour hold		Swing		

General election 1951: North West Durham
Party	Candidate	Votes	%	±%
Labour	James Murray	30,417	68.66	
Conservative	James Quigley	13,885	31.34	
Majority		16,532	37.32	
Turnout		44,302	85.06	
Labour hold		Swing		

General election 1955: North West Durham
Party	Candidate	Votes	%	±%
Labour	William Ainsley	27,116	67.41	
Conservative	Thomas T Hubble	13,110	32.59	
Majority		14,006	34.82	
Turnout		40,226	79.05	
Labour hold		Swing		

General election 1959: North West Durham
Party	Candidate	Votes	%	±%
Labour	William Ainsley	28,064	68.06	
Conservative	Olive Sinclair	13,172	31.94	
Majority		14,892	36.12	
Turnout		41,236	81.45	
Labour hold		Swing		

=== Elections in the 1960s ===
General election 1964: North West Durham
Party	Candidate	Votes	%	±%
Labour	Ernest Armstrong	26,006	69.75	
Conservative	Kenneth L Ellis	11,280	30.25	
Majority		14,726	39.50	
Turnout		37,286	77.98	
Labour hold		Swing		

General election 1966: North West Durham
Party	Candidate	Votes	%	±%
Labour	Ernest Armstrong	25,260	73.58	
Conservative	Colin MacAndrew	9,070	26.42	
Majority		16,190	47.16	
Turnout		34,330	73.37	
Labour hold		Swing		

=== Elections in the 1970s ===
General election 1970: North West Durham
Party	Candidate	Votes	%	±%
Labour	Ernest Armstrong	24,245	69.6	−4.0
Conservative	Alan E Page	10,590	30.4	+4.0
Majority		13,655	39.2	−8.0
Turnout		34,834	72.8	−0.6
Labour hold		Swing		

General election February 1974: North West Durham
Party	Candidate	Votes	%	±%
Labour	Ernest Armstrong	28,326	59.01	
Conservative	J Riddell	10,865	22.64	
Liberal	JK Forster	8,809	18.35	
Majority		17,461	36.37	
Turnout		47,999	79.09	
Labour hold		Swing		

General election October 1974: North West Durham
Party	Candidate	Votes	%	±%
Labour	Ernest Armstrong	27,953	64.16	
Conservative	MJB Cookson	9,197	21.11	
Liberal	JK Forster	6,418	14.73	
Majority		18,756	43.05	
Turnout		43,566	71.09	
Labour hold		Swing		

General election 1979: North West Durham
Party	Candidate	Votes	%	±%
Labour	Ernest Armstrong	29,525	61.30	
Conservative	T Fenwick	14,245	29.58	
Liberal	J Hannibell	4,394	9.12	
Majority		15,280	31.72	
Turnout		48,161	75.98	
Labour hold		Swing		

=== Elections in the 1980s ===
General election 1983: North West Durham
Party	Candidate	Votes	%	±%
Labour	Ernest Armstrong	19,135	44.6	
Conservative	Terence Middleton	12,779	29.8	
Liberal	Chris Foote Wood	11,008	25.7	
Majority		6,356	14.8	
Turnout		42,923	70.7	
Labour hold		Swing		

General election 1987: North West Durham
Party	Candidate	Votes	%	±%
Labour	Hilary Armstrong	22,947	50.9	+6.3
Conservative	Derek Iceton	12,785	28.4	−1.4
Liberal	Chris Foote Wood	9,349	20.7	−4.9
Majority		10,162	22.5	+7.7
Turnout		45,081	73.5	−2.8
Labour hold		Swing	+3.9	

=== Elections in the 1990s ===
General election 1992: North West Durham
Party	Candidate	Votes	%	±%
Labour	Hilary Armstrong	26,734	57.8	+6.9
Conservative	Theresa May	12,747	27.6	−0.8
Liberal Democrats	Tim Farron	6,728	14.6	−6.1
Majority		13,987	30.2	+7.7
Turnout		46,209	75.5	+2.0
Labour hold		Swing	+3.4	

General election 1997: North West Durham
Party	Candidate	Votes	%	±%
Labour	Hilary Armstrong	31,855	68.8	+10.7
Conservative	Louise St John-Howe	7,101	15.3	−12.0
Liberal Democrats	Anthony Gillings	4,991	10.8	−3.9
Referendum	Rodney Atkinson	2,372	5.1	New
Majority		24,754	53.5	+23.3
Turnout		46,319	68.7	−6.8
Labour hold		Swing	+11.4	

=== Elections in the 2000s ===
General election 2001: North West Durham
Party	Candidate	Votes	%	±%
Labour	Hilary Armstrong	24,526	62.5	−6.3
Conservative	William Clouston	8,193	20.9	+5.6
Liberal Democrats	Alan Ord	5,846	14.9	+4.1
Socialist Labour	Joan Hartnell	661	1.7	New
Majority		16,333	41.6	−11.9
Turnout		39,226	58.5	−10.2
Labour hold		Swing	-5.9	

General election 2005: North West Durham
Party	Candidate	Votes	%	±%
Labour	Hilary Armstrong	21,312	53.9	−8.6
Liberal Democrats	Alan Ord	7,869	19.9	+5.0
Conservative	Jamie Devlin	6,463	16.4	−4.5
Independent	Watts Stelling	3,865	9.8	New
Majority		13,443	34.0	−7.6
Turnout		39,509	58.0	−0.5
Labour hold		Swing	−6.8	

=== Elections in the 2010s ===
General election 2010: North West Durham
Party	Candidate	Votes	%	±%
Labour	Pat Glass	18,539	42.3	−11.6
Liberal Democrats	Owen Temple	10,927	24.9	+5.0
Conservative	Michelle Tempest	8,766	20.0	+3.6
Independent	Watts Stelling	2,472	5.6	−4.2
BNP	Michael Stewart	1,852	4.2	New
UKIP	Andrew McDonald	1,259	2.9	New
Majority		7,612	17.4	−16.6
Turnout		43,815	62.0	+4.2
Labour hold		Swing	-8.3	

General election 2015: North West Durham
Party	Candidate	Votes	%	±%
Labour	Pat Glass	20,074	46.9	+4.6
Conservative	Charlotte Haitham-Taylor	10,018	23.4	+3.4
UKIP	Bruce Reid	7,265	17.0	+14.1
Liberal Democrats	Owen Temple	3,894	9.1	−15.8
Green	Mark Shilcock	1,567	3.7	New
Majority		10,056	23.5	+6.1
Turnout		42,818	61.3	−0.7
Labour hold		Swing	+0.6	

General election 2017: North West Durham
Party	Candidate	Votes	%	±%
Labour	Laura Pidcock	25,308	52.8	▲5.9
Conservative	Sally-Ann Hart	16,516	34.5	▲11.1
Liberal Democrats	Owen Temple	3,398	7.1	▼2.0
UKIP	Alan Breeze	2,150	4.5	▼12.5
Green	Dominic Horsman	530	1.1	▼2.6
Majority		8,792	18.3	▼5.2
Turnout		47,902	66.5	▲5.2
Labour hold		Swing	▼2.6	

General election 2019: North West Durham
Party	Candidate	Votes	%	±%
Conservative	Richard Holden	19,990	41.9	▲7.4
Labour	Laura Pidcock	18,846	39.5	▼13.3
Brexit Party	John Wolstenholme	3,193	6.7	New
Liberal Democrats	Michael Peacock	2,831	5.9	▼1.2
Independent	Watts Stelling	1,216	2.6	New
Green	David Sewell	1,173	2.5	▲1.4
Independent	David Lindsay	414	0.9	New
Majority		1,144	2.4	N/A
Turnout		47,663	66.0	▼0.5
Conservative gain from Labour		Swing	▲10.4	

== See also ==
- List of parliamentary constituencies in County Durham
- History of parliamentary constituencies and boundaries in Durham
