= James Murray (historian) =

Independent minister (1732–1782)

James Murray (1732–1782) was a non-conformist minister of the Church of Scotland and prolific religious author. He expressed his views freely, being strongly anti-Catholic and opposed to the American War of Independence. He also made political comments, condemning the administration of Lord North from 1770 onwards. His most infamous publication was the satirical "Sermons to Asses" of 1768 (multiple later editions) and the illustrated history "An Impartial History of the Present War in America".

== Life ==
He was born at Fans near Earlston in Berwickshire the son of John Murray. He was educated locally then, somewhat late in life, went to Edinburgh University where he completed his study of Divinity in 1760.

He became tutor to the family of William Weddell of Belford, Northumberland for a year then became assistant to the minister of Bondgate Church in Alnwick.

Around 1763 he had a dispute and left Bondgate church taking a large proportion of the congregation with him and founding the Bailliffgate Square Church (now a museum).

In 1764 he was offered a position by the Church of Scotland as minister of the newly completed High Bridge Church in Newcastle-upon-Tyne. He remained there for the rest of his life and died in Newcastle on 28 January 1782 aged 49

== Family ==
He married Sarah Weddell, daughter of William Weddell. Their children included

- Dr John Murray MD (1768-1833) of Newcastle
- Isabella Murray, married her cousin James Murray
- William
- Jane
- Sarah

== Publications ==
- The History of Religion 4.vols (1762)
- Select Discourses (1765)
- Sermons to Asses (1768)
- An Essay on Redemption by Jesus Christ (1768)
- Sermons to Doctors in Divinity (1768)
- Sermons to Men, Women and Children (1768)
- Rudiments of the English Tongue (1771)
- A History of the Churches in England and Scotland from the Reformation to This Present Time (1772)
- New Sermons to Asses (1773)
- The Travels of the Imagination (1773)
- The Character of Eglon, King of Moab (1773)
- Lectures to Lords Spiritual (1774)
- A Grave Answer to Mr Wesley's "Calm Address to our American Colonies" (1775)
- The Old Fox Tarred and Feathered (1775)
- Lectures upon the Most Remarkable Characters and Transactions Recorded in the Book of Genesis 2 vols. (1777)
- The Magazine of Ants (1777)
- Lectures upon the Book of Revelation 2 vols. (1778)
- The New Maid of the Oaks, a Tragedy (1778)
- An Impartial History of the Present War in America (vol.1 1778, vol.2 1780)
- Sermons to Ministers of State (1781)
- Sermons for the General Fast Day (1781)
- The Fast, a Poem (1781)
- News from the Pope to the Devil (1781)
- Popery not Christianity (1781)
- An Alarm Without Cause (dnk)
