= Joseph Batey =

British politician

Joseph Batey (4 March 1867 – 21 February 1949) was a Labour Party politician in the United Kingdom.

Batey became a coal miner, before winning election as a checkweighman, and then becoming a full-time official for the Durham Miners' Association. A support of the Labour Party, Batey served on the South Shields Town Council and Board of Guardians.

He was elected at the 1922 election as member of parliament (MP) for the Spennymoor constituency in County Durham, which he had contested unsuccessfully at the 1918 election. Batey held the seat until he resigned from the House of Commons on 6 July 1942, by the procedural device of accepting the post of Steward of the Manor of Northstead.

Parliament of the United Kingdom
Preceded by Samuel Galbraith	Member of Parliament for Spennymoor; 1922–1942	Succeeded by James Dixon Murray
