= 1826 in Wales =

- Centuries: 17th; 18th; 19th; 20th; 21st
- Decades: 1800s; 1810s; 1820s; 1830s; 1840s
- See also: List of years in Wales; Timeline of Welsh history 1826 in The United Kingdom Scotland Elsewhere

This article is about the particular significance of the year 1826 to Wales and its people.

== Incumbents ==
- Lord Lieutenant of Anglesey – Henry Paget, 1st Marquess of Anglesey
- Lord Lieutenant of Brecknockshire – Henry Somerset, 6th Duke of Beaufort
- Lord Lieutenant of Caernarvonshire – Thomas Assheton Smith
- Lord Lieutenant of Cardiganshire – William Edward Powell
- Lord Lieutenant of Carmarthenshire – George Rice, 3rd Baron Dynevor
- Lord Lieutenant of Denbighshire – Sir Watkin Williams-Wynn, 5th Baronet
- Lord Lieutenant of Flintshire – Robert Grosvenor, 1st Marquess of Westminster
- Lord Lieutenant of Glamorgan – John Crichton-Stuart, 2nd Marquess of Bute
- Lord Lieutenant of Merionethshire – Sir Watkin Williams-Wynn, 5th Baronet
- Lord Lieutenant of Montgomeryshire – Edward Clive, 1st Earl of Powis
- Lord Lieutenant of Pembrokeshire – Sir John Owen, 1st Baronet
- Lord Lieutenant of Radnorshire – George Rodney, 3rd Baron Rodney
- Bishop of Bangor – Henry Majendie
- Bishop of Llandaff – William Van Mildert (until 24 April); Charles Sumner (from 21 May)
- Bishop of St Asaph – John Luxmoore
- Bishop of St Davids – John Jenkinson

== Events ==
- 30 January - Opening of the Menai Suspension Bridge, designed by Thomas Telford.
- 1 July - Opening of Telford's Conwy Suspension Bridge.
- Wrexham Maelor Hospital's predecessor founded.
- The Calvinistic Methodist "connexion" produces its Constitutional Deed. It incorporates all property (such as chapels) as the property of the connexion as a whole.

== Arts and literature ==
=== New books ===
- Daniel Evans (Daniel Ddu o Geredigion) - Golwg ar Gyflwr yr Iddewon, Cerdd
- James Humphreys - Observations on the Actual State of the English Laws of Real Property, with the outlines of a Code

=== Music ===
- 24 May - John Parry (Bardd Alaw) is given a benefit concert by the Society of Cymmrodorion.

== Births ==
- 13 January (in Ceylon) - Henry Matthews, 1st Viscount Llandaff (d. 1913)
- 10 February - Edward Williams, iron-master (d. 1886)
- 26 February - John Llewelyn Davies, English theologian of Welsh parentage (d. 1916)
- 1 March - John Thomas, harpist (d. 1913)
- 22 March - Lewys Glyn Dyfi (Lewis Meredith), poet and preacher (d. 1891)
- 27 April - Owen Phillips, Dean of St Davids (d. 1897)
- 8 May - George Osborne Morgan, lawyer (d. 1897)
- 11 May - David Charles Davies, Nonconformist leader (d. 1891)
- 26 June - Evan Davies, educationalist and lawyer (died 1872)
- 18 December - Henry Parry, Anglican bishop of Welsh parentage (d. 1893 in Australia)

== Deaths ==
- April - Ned Turner, prize-fighter, 34
- 21 April - Thomas Johnes, clergyman, chancellor and canon of Exeter, about 76
- May (approximate) - Richard Griffiths, industrial pioneer who opened up transport links into the Rhondda, 70
- October - John Williams, clergyman, teacher and collector of manuscripts, about 76
- 7 December - John Vivian, industrialist, 76
- 18 December - Iolo Morganwg, poet and antiquary, 79
- 28 December - Nathaniel Williams, theologian and hymn-writer, 84

== See also ==
- 1826 in Ireland
