= 1822 in Wales =

- Centuries: 17th; 18th; 19th; 20th; 21st
- Decades: 1800s; 1810s; 1820s; 1830s; 1840s
- See also: List of years in Wales; Timeline of Welsh history 1822 in The United Kingdom Scotland Elsewhere

This article is about the particular significance of the year 1822 to Wales and its people.

== Incumbents ==
- Lord Lieutenant of Anglesey – Henry Paget, 1st Marquess of Anglesey
- Lord Lieutenant of Brecknockshire – Henry Somerset, 6th Duke of Beaufort
- Lord Lieutenant of Caernarvonshire – Thomas Bulkeley, 7th Viscount Bulkeley (until 3 June); Thomas Assheton Smith (from 18 July)
- Lord Lieutenant of Cardiganshire – William Edward Powell
- Lord Lieutenant of Carmarthenshire – George Rice, 3rd Baron Dynevor
- Lord Lieutenant of Denbighshire – Sir Watkin Williams-Wynn, 5th Baronet
- Lord Lieutenant of Flintshire – Robert Grosvenor, 1st Marquess of Westminster
- Lord Lieutenant of Glamorgan – John Crichton-Stuart, 2nd Marquess of Bute
- Lord Lieutenant of Merionethshire – Sir Watkin Williams-Wynn, 5th Baronet
- Lord Lieutenant of Montgomeryshire – Edward Clive, 1st Earl of Powis
- Lord Lieutenant of Pembrokeshire – Richard Philipps, 1st Baron Milford
- Lord Lieutenant of Radnorshire – George Rodney, 3rd Baron Rodney
- Bishop of Bangor – Henry Majendie
- Bishop of Llandaff – William Van Mildert
- Bishop of St Asaph – John Luxmoore
- Bishop of St Davids – Thomas Burgess

== Events ==
- April - Launch of the Chester Cymmrodorion Society.
- 13 June - William Lloyd climbs Boorendo in the Himalayas.
- 12 August - St David's College (now the University of Wales, Lampeter) is founded by Thomas Burgess, Bishop of St David's.
- Beginning of "Rhyfel y Sais Bach" ("War of the Little Englishman"), a dispute over enclosures in Pembrokeshire.
- Horse-drawn trams begin a passenger service between Tredegar and Newport.
- Sir Thomas Phillipps, 1st Baronet, establishes a private printing press in Broadway Tower on his estate at Middle Hill in Worcestershire.

== Arts and literature ==
=== New books ===
- John Hughes - An Essay on the Ancient and Present State of the Welsh Language
- William Owen Pughe - Hu Gadarn
- John Montgomery Traherne - Lists of Knights of the Shire of Glamorgan
- Y Cymmrodor (first, unnumbered volume)

=== Music ===
- Stephen Llwyd - "Caerllyngoed" (hymn tune)

== Births ==
- 2 January – Basil Jones, bishop (d. 1897)
- 2 March – Michael D. Jones, Tad y Wladfa, founder of the Welsh settlement in Patagonia (d. 1898)
- 3 August – John Rhys Morgan, minister, teacher and poet (d. 1900)
- 25 September - William Bloomfield Douglas, colonial governor (d. 1906)
- 4 October - Charles Williams-Wynn, politician (d. 1896)
- 27 October – Aneurin Jones (Aneurin Fardd), writer (d. 1904)
- 15 December – Edward Stephen (Tanymarian), musician (d. 1885)
- 22 December - John Roberts (Ieuan Gwyllt), musician and minister (d. 1877)

== Deaths ==
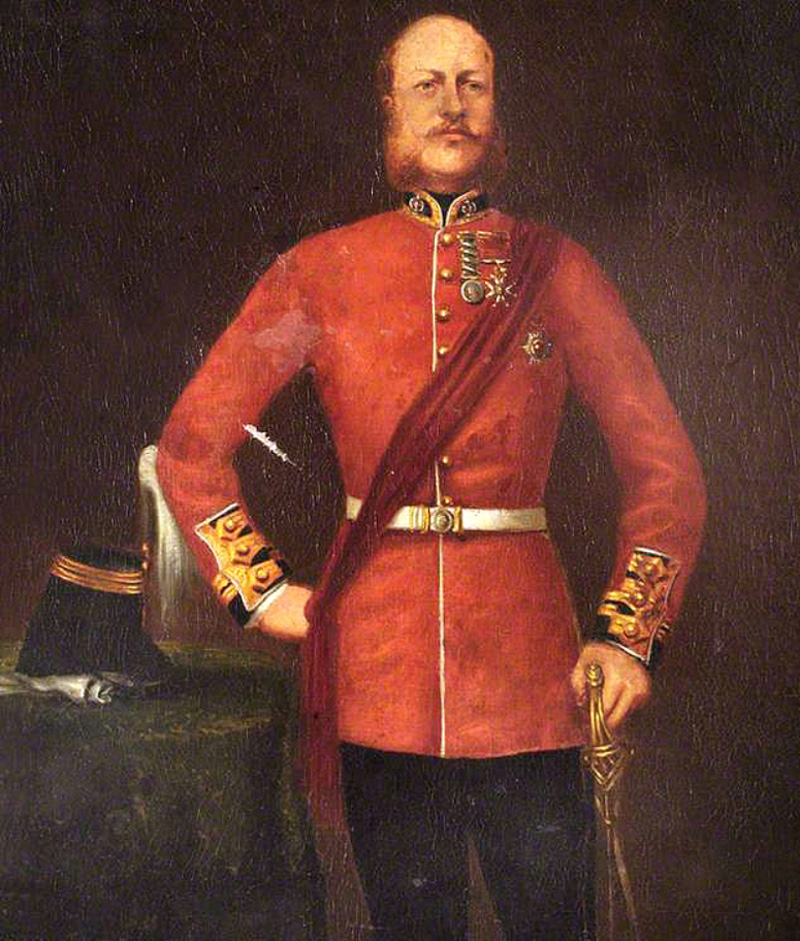
Lieutenant Colonel Poulett Somerset, MP for Monmouthshire

- 30 March – David Thomas (Dafydd Ddu Eryri), poet, 62
- 9 April – William Jones, Welsh-descended Governor of Rhode Island, 68
- 22 May – Samuel Homfray, industrialist, 59
- 5 June
  - (near Durham) - Stephen Kemble, actor, brother of Sarah Siddons, 64
  - George Lewis, theologian, 59
- 19 June – Poulett Somerset, soldier and politician, 53
- 25 September – John Henry Bowen, American politician of Welsh descent, 42
- 22 December – Sarah Wesley (née Gwynne), widow of Charles Wesley, 96

== See also ==
- 1822 in Ireland
