= 1820 in Wales =

- Centuries: 17th; 18th; 19th; 20th; 21st
- Decades: 1800s; 1810s; 1820s; 1830s; 1840s
- See also: List of years in Wales; Timeline of Welsh history 1820 in The United Kingdom Scotland Elsewhere

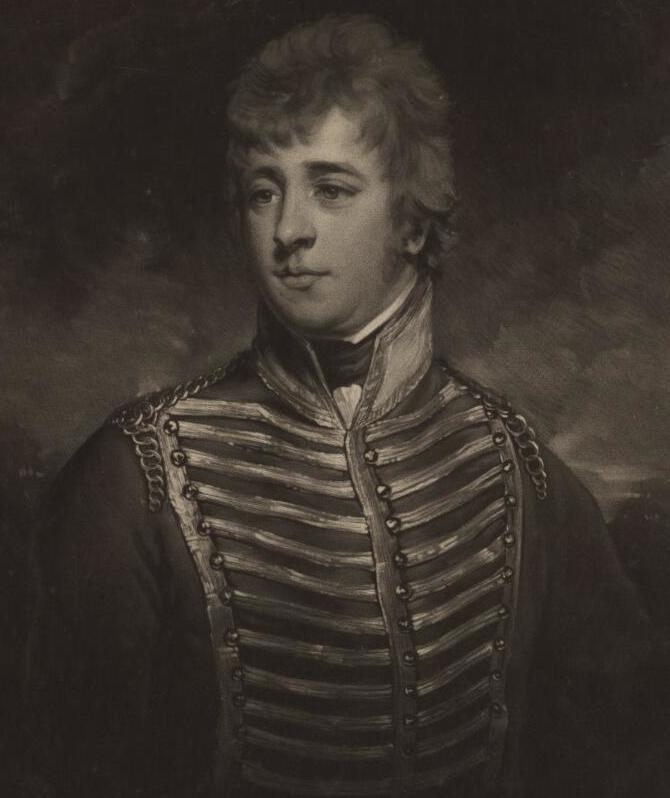
Portrait of Sir Watkins Williams Wynne Bart

This article is about the particular significance of the year 1820 to Wales and its people.

== Incumbents ==
- Lord Lieutenant of Anglesey – Henry Paget, 1st Marquess of Anglesey
- Lord Lieutenant of Brecknockshire and Monmouthshire – Henry Somerset, 6th Duke of Beaufort
- Lord Lieutenant of Caernarvonshire – Thomas Bulkeley, 7th Viscount Bulkeley
- Lord Lieutenant of Cardiganshire – William Edward Powell
- Lord Lieutenant of Carmarthenshire – George Rice, 3rd Baron Dynevor
- Lord Lieutenant of Denbighshire – Sir Watkin Williams-Wynn, 5th Baronet
- Lord Lieutenant of Flintshire – Robert Grosvenor, 1st Marquess of Westminster
- Lord Lieutenant of Glamorgan – John Crichton-Stuart, 2nd Marquess of Bute
- Lord Lieutenant of Merionethshire – Sir Watkin Williams-Wynn, 5th Baronet
- Lord Lieutenant of Montgomeryshire – Edward Clive, 1st Earl of Powis
- Lord Lieutenant of Pembrokeshire – Richard Philipps, 1st Baron Milford
- Lord Lieutenant of Radnorshire – George Rodney, 3rd Baron Rodney
- Bishop of Bangor – Henry Majendie
- Bishop of Llandaff – Herbert Marsh (until 28 April); William Van Mildert (from 31 May)
- Bishop of St Asaph – John Luxmoore
- Bishop of St Davids – Thomas Burgess

== Events ==
- 29 January – The Prince of Wales becomes King George IV of the United Kingdom upon the death of his father, King George III.
- 14 April – At the completion of the United Kingdom general election:
  - Henry Paget, later Marquess of Anglesey, is elected as member for Anglesey.
  - Wyndham Lewis is elected for Cardiff.
  - Christopher Cole is re-elected for Glamorganshire.
- 24 June – The Honourable Society of Cymmrodorion is revived, having been in abeyance since 1787.
- date unknown
  - The first "colliery school" in the South Wales coalfield is established at Hirwaun.
  - Thomas Price (Carnhuanawc) founds a Welsh school at Gelli Felen.
  - Crawshay Bailey becomes a partner at Nant-y-glo ironworks with his brother, Joseph Bailey.
  - Tondu Ironworks is built by Sir Robert Price.
  - John Scandrett Harford meets Bishop Thomas Burgess and offers to donate the site of Lampeter Castle for the construction of St David's College.

== Arts and literature ==
=== New books ===
- Felicia Hemans – The Sceptic
- John Jones (Tegid) – Traethawd ar Gadwedigaeth yr Iaith Gymraeg
- Robert Jones – Drych yr Amseroedd
- William Probert - Y Gododdin (first English translation)

=== Music ===
- Edward Jones – Hen Ganiadau Cymru

== Births ==
- 13 May – Robert Owen, theologian (d. 1902)
- 21 May – Sir Thomas Lloyd, 1st Baronet, politician and landowner (d. 1877)
- 22 May – Sir Watkin Williams-Wynn, 6th Baronet, politician (d. 1885)
- 20 June – Thomas Essile Davies (Dewi Wyn o Essyllt), poet (d. 1891)
- 5 September – Evan Jones (Ieuan Gwynedd), minister and journalist (d. 1852)

== Deaths ==
- 20 January – Eliezer Williams, clergyman and genealogist, 75
- 29 January – King George III of the United Kingdom, Prince of Wales 1751–1760, 81
- 6 May – Wilmot Vaughan, 2nd Earl of Lisburne, landowner, 64
- 16 June – Thomas Jones of Denbigh, Methodist preacher and writer, 64
- 27 June – William Lort Mansel, bishop and academic, 67
- 23 August – Edward Randles, harpist, 57
- 28 August – Henry Mills, musician, 63

== See also ==
- 1820 in Ireland
