= 1824 in Wales =

- Centuries: 17th; 18th; 19th; 20th; 21st
- Decades: 1800s; 1810s; 1820s; 1830s; 1840s
- See also: List of years in Wales; Timeline of Welsh history 1824 in The United Kingdom Scotland Elsewhere

This article is about the particular significance of the year 1824 to Wales and its people.

== Incumbents ==
- Lord Lieutenant of Anglesey – Henry Paget, 1st Marquess of Anglesey
- Lord Lieutenant of Brecknockshire – Henry Somerset, 6th Duke of Beaufort
- Lord Lieutenant of Caernarvonshire – Thomas Assheton Smith
- Lord Lieutenant of Cardiganshire – William Edward Powell
- Lord Lieutenant of Carmarthenshire – George Rice, 3rd Baron Dynevor
- Lord Lieutenant of Denbighshire – Sir Watkin Williams-Wynn, 5th Baronet
- Lord Lieutenant of Flintshire – Robert Grosvenor, 1st Marquess of Westminster
- Lord Lieutenant of Glamorgan – John Crichton-Stuart, 2nd Marquess of Bute
- Lord Lieutenant of Merionethshire – Sir Watkin Williams-Wynn, 5th Baronet
- Lord Lieutenant of Montgomeryshire – Edward Clive, 1st Earl of Powis
- Lord Lieutenant of Pembrokeshire – Sir John Owen, 1st Baronet
- Lord Lieutenant of Radnorshire – George Rodney, 3rd Baron Rodney
- Bishop of Bangor – Henry Majendie
- Bishop of Llandaff – William Van Mildert
- Bishop of St Asaph – John Luxmoore
- Bishop of St Davids – Thomas Burgess

== Events ==
- January – The construction of the "leat" or "leete" at Loggerheads, Denbighshire, used in the local lead mining industry, is first recorded.
- 8 September – The Society of Cymmrodorion sponsors a major eisteddfod at Welshpool.
- 18 December – William Chambers inherits the Stepney estate.
- dates unknown
  - The first gasometer in Wales is built at Greenfield, Flintshire.
  - Chess William Davies Evans develops the Evans Gambit.
  - Major repairs to Bangor Cathedral are begun.
  - Two new furnaces are erected at the Dyffryn ironworks by Anthony Hill.

== Arts and literature ==
=== New books ===
==== English language ====
- T. G. Cumming – Description of the Iron Bridges of Suspension now erecting over the Strait of Menai at Bangor and over the River Conway
- Benjamin Jones (P A Môn) – An Elegy on the death of Benjamin B. Jones, the eldest surviving child of B. Jones of Holyhead
- William Owen – Drych Crefyddol yn dangos Dechreuad y Grefydd Brotestanaidd
- Thomas Prichard – Welsh Minstrelsy: Containing the Land beneath the Sea

==== Welsh language ====
- David Davis (Castellhywel) – Telyn Dewi
- John Howell (editor) – Blodau Dyfed'

=== Music ===
- Seren Gomer (collection of hymns including Grongar by John Edwards)

== Births ==
- 17 February – James Crichton-Stuart, politician (d. 1891)
- March – Isaac D. Seyburn, Welsh-born merchant captain and naval officer (d. 1895)
- 17 April – John Basson Humffray, political reformer in Australia (d. 1891)
- 24 July – Robert Jones Derfel, poet (d. 1905)
- 15 December – Morgan Thomas, Welsh-born Australian surgeon and philanthropist (d. 1903)
- date unknown – David James Jenkins, shipowner and politician (d. 1891)

== Deaths ==
- 1 February – John Rice Jones, Welsh-born American politician and soldier, 64
- 18 April – Edward Jones, harpist ("Bardd y Brenin"), 72
- 30 July – David Howell, American jurist of Welsh descent, 77
- 24 August – Thomas Parry, Chennai merchant, 56 (cholera)
- 18 September – Thomas Hill of Dennis, industrialist, about 92
- November – William Moses, poet, 82
- 24 December – John Downman, artist, 74

== See also ==
- 1824 in Ireland
