= 1834 in Wales =

- Centuries: 17th; 18th; 19th; 20th; 21st
- Decades: 1810s; 1820s; 1830s; 1840s; 1850s
- See also: List of years in Wales; Timeline of Welsh history 1834 in The United Kingdom Scotland Elsewhere

This article is about the particular significance of the year 1834 to Wales and its people.

== Incumbents ==
- Lord Lieutenant of Anglesey – Henry Paget, 1st Marquess of Anglesey
- Lord Lieutenant of Brecknockshire – Henry Somerset, 6th Duke of Beaufort
- Lord Lieutenant of Caernarvonshire – Peter Drummond-Burrell, 22nd Baron Willoughby de Eresby
- Lord Lieutenant of Cardiganshire – William Edward Powell
- Lord Lieutenant of Carmarthenshire – George Rice, 3rd Baron Dynevor
- Lord Lieutenant of Denbighshire – Sir Watkin Williams-Wynn, 5th Baronet
- Lord Lieutenant of Flintshire – Robert Grosvenor, 1st Marquess of Westminster
- Lord Lieutenant of Glamorgan – John Crichton-Stuart, 2nd Marquess of Bute
- Lord Lieutenant of Merionethshire – Sir Watkin Williams-Wynn, 5th Baronet
- Lord Lieutenant of Montgomeryshire – Edward Herbert, 2nd Earl of Powis
- Lord Lieutenant of Pembrokeshire – Sir John Owen, 1st Baronet
- Lord Lieutenant of Radnorshire – George Rodney, 3rd Baron Rodney
- Bishop of Bangor – Christopher Bethell
- Bishop of Llandaff – Edward Copleston
- Bishop of St Asaph – William Carey
- Bishop of St Davids – John Jenkinson

== Events ==
- 12 February - The city of Bangor, Maine, is incorporated in the United States. It is said to have been named after the Welsh hymn tune "Bangor".
- 23 June - HMS Tartarus is launched at Pembroke Dock. It is the Royal Navy's first steam-powered man-of-war (a paddle gunvessel).
- 27 December - A ferry from Penally to Caldey sinks and 15 people drown.
- 29 December - The West of England and South Wales District Bank is established in Bristol.
- unknown dates
  - William Williams of Wern starts the "General Union" movement.
  - The government begins to make grants of 50% towards the erection of new elementary schools in England and Wales; hence the Treasury awards £84 for a school to be set up at Abergwili.
  - Border Breweries (Wrexham) begin operation at the Nag's Head public house.
  - Walter Rice Howell Powell inherits the Maesgwynne estate. Nicholas, Thomas.

== Arts and literature ==
- At an eisteddfod held in Cardiff, Augusta Hall, Lady Llanover, wins a prize for her essay on the Welsh language. Taliesin Williams wins the chair.

=== New books ===
- Sir Harford Jones Brydges - An Account of His Majesty's Mission to Persia in the years 1807-11
- Thomas Medwin - The Angler in Wales: Or, Days and Nights of Sportsmen
- John Humffreys Parry - The Cambrian Plutarch: Comprising Memoirs of Some of the Most Eminent Welshmen

=== Music ===
- Foulk Robert Williams - Llyfr Cerddoriaeth o Gerddi Sion... (unpublished MS)

== Births ==
- 15 February - Sir William Henry Preece, engineer (d. 1913)
- 31 March - Thomas Rees Jones, engineer and inventor (d. 1897)
- 14 April - Arthur John Williams, lawyer, author and politician (d. 1911)
- 2 July - Stuart Rendel, 1st Baron Rendel, politician (d. 1913)
- 23 August - Hugh Owen Thomas, orthopaedic surgeon (d. 1891)
- 16 October - Pryce Pryce-Jones, mail order entrepreneur (d. 1920)
- 21 December - Griffith Rhys Jones, choirmaster and conductor (d. 1897)
- date unknown - William Thomas (Gwilym Marles), minister (d. 1879)

== Deaths ==
- 17 February - John Thelwall, Welsh-descended orator, writer, political reformer, journalist, poet, elocutionist and speech therapist, 69
- 29 March - John Mytton, eccentric squire and politician of the Welsh border country, 37 (alcohol-related)
- 13 May - John Jones, clergyman and writer, 58
- 20 June - John Wynne Griffith, politician, 71
- 9 July - Dafydd Cadwaladr, preacher, 82
- 11 August - William Crawshay I, industrialist, about 70 (b. 1764)
- 2 September - David Charles, hymn-writer (b. 1762)

== See also ==
- 1834 in Ireland
