= 1831 in Wales =

- Centuries: 17th; 18th; 19th; 20th; 21st
- Decades: 1810s; 1820s; 1830s; 1840s; 1850s
- See also: List of years in Wales; Timeline of Welsh history 1831 in The United Kingdom Scotland Elsewhere

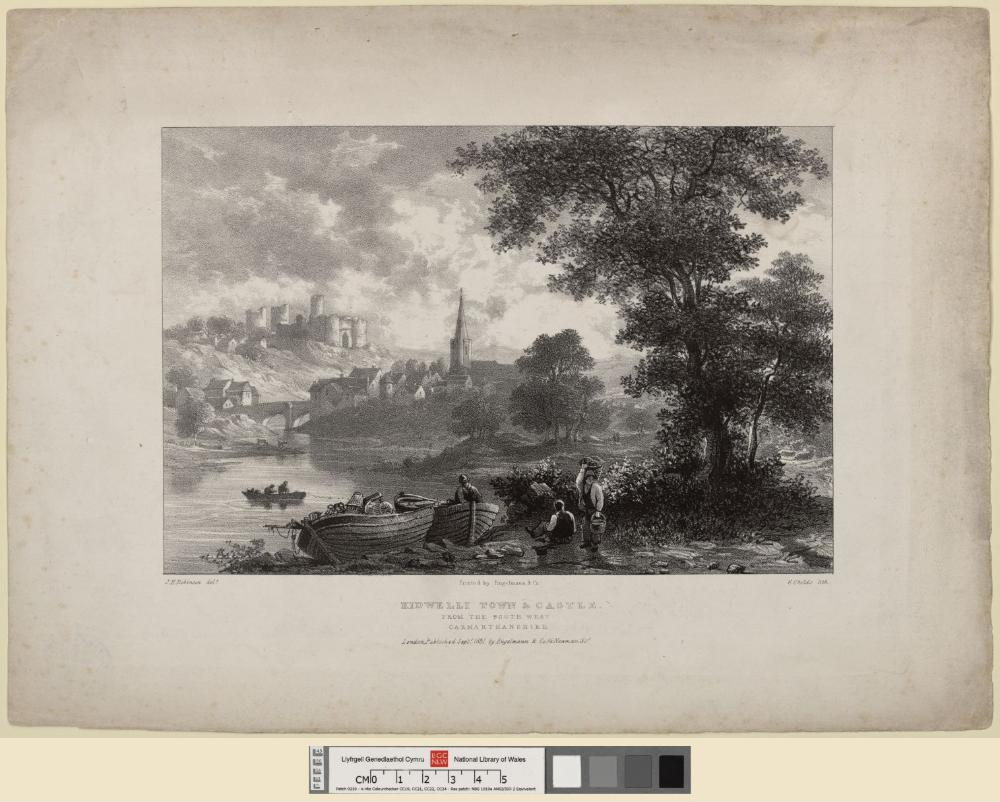

This article is about the particular significance of the year 1831 to Wales and its people.

== Incumbents ==
- Lord Lieutenant of Anglesey – Henry Paget, 1st Marquess of Anglesey
- Lord Lieutenant of Brecknockshire – Henry Somerset, 6th Duke of Beaufort
- Lord Lieutenant of Caernarvonshire – Peter Drummond-Burrell, 22nd Baron Willoughby de Eresby
- Lord Lieutenant of Cardiganshire – William Edward Powell
- Lord Lieutenant of Carmarthenshire – George Rice, 3rd Baron Dynevor
- Lord Lieutenant of Denbighshire – Sir Watkin Williams-Wynn, 5th Baronet
- Lord Lieutenant of Flintshire – Robert Grosvenor, 1st Marquess of Westminster
- Lord Lieutenant of Glamorgan – John Crichton-Stuart, 2nd Marquess of Bute
- Lord Lieutenant of Merionethshire – Sir Watkin Williams-Wynn, 5th Baronet
- Lord Lieutenant of Montgomeryshire – Edward Herbert, 2nd Earl of Powis
- Lord Lieutenant of Pembrokeshire – Sir John Owen, 1st Baronet
- Lord Lieutenant of Radnorshire – George Rodney, 3rd Baron Rodney
- Bishop of Bangor – Christopher Bethell
- Bishop of Llandaff – Edward Copleston
- Bishop of St Asaph – William Carey
- Bishop of St Davids – John Jenkinson

== Events ==
- 28 April–1 June – In the UK general election:
  - Robert Fulke Greville is defeated in Pembrokeshire by Sir John Owen of Orielton.
  - Edward Lloyd-Mostyn, 2nd Baron Mostyn becomes MP for Flintshire.
  - John Jones of Ystrad is injured in rioting during the election at Carmarthen, causing polling there to be postponed.
- 3 June – The Merthyr Rising reaches its climax.
- 5 August – Charles Darwin travels from Shrewsbury to Llangollen with his tutor, Rev Adam Sedgwick, to carry out geological studies. They remain in Wales for more than two weeks.
- 18 August – The paddle steamer Rothsay Castle is wrecked at the eastern end of the Menai Strait with the loss of 93 lives.
- August – John Jones of Ystrad holds the constituency of Carmarthen.
- 22 October – John Jones of Ystrad and Robert Fulke Greville fight a duel at Tafarnspite.
- Repeal of the slate tax.
- Port Talbot ironworks opens.
- William Rees (Gwilym Hiraethog) becomes a minister.

== Arts and literature ==
=== New books ===
- John Evans (I. D. Ffraid) – Hanes yr Iddewon

=== New publications ===
- Autumn – Y Drysorfa, a Calvinistic Methodist publication, restarts under the editorship of John Parry.

== Births ==
- 13 January – William Hugh Evans, minister and author (d. 1909)
- May – Dewi Havhesp, poet (d. 1884)
- 3 May – Sir Walter Vaughan Morgan, Lord Mayor of London (d. 1916)
- 16 May – David E. Hughes, musician and professor of music (d. 1900)
- 21 July – Edward Lewis, Welsh-born New Zealand clergyman (d. 1913)
- 16 October – John Jones (Eos Bradwen), composer (d. 1899)
- 8 December
  - William Dykins, poet (d. 1872)
  - Edward Payson Evans, historian and linguist (d. 1917)
- 14 December – Griffith John, missionary (d. 1912)
- 20 December – William T. Davies, Governor of Pennsylvania (d. 1912)
- date unknown – William Davies (Gwilym Teilo), writer (d. 1892)

== Deaths ==
- 1 January – Charles Heath, printer, writer, and radical Mayor of Monmouth, about 70
- 7 January – Edward "Celtic" Davies, author, 74
- 17 April – Sir Thomas Mostyn, 6th Baronet, politician, 54
- 30 April – Elizabeth Herbert, Countess of Pembroke, 93
- 18 May – John Vaughan, 3rd Earl of Lisburne, landowner and politician, 62
- 8 June – Sarah Siddons, actress, 75
- 11 August – Cradock Glascott, Evangelical clergyman and associate of the Wesley brothers, 88
- 13 August – Dic Penderyn, labourer, 23 (executed)
- probable – Joseph Davies, editor of Y Brud a Sylwydd, age unknown

== See also ==
- 1831 in Ireland
