= 1825 in Wales =

- Centuries: 17th; 18th; 19th; 20th; 21st
- Decades: 1800s; 1810s; 1820s; 1830s; 1840s
- See also: List of years in Wales; Timeline of Welsh history 1825 in The United Kingdom Scotland Elsewhere

This article is about the particular significance of the year 1825 to Wales and its people.

== Incumbents ==
- Lord Lieutenant of Anglesey – Henry Paget, 1st Marquess of Anglesey
- Lord Lieutenant of Brecknockshire – Henry Somerset, 6th Duke of Beaufort
- Lord Lieutenant of Caernarvonshire – Thomas Assheton Smith
- Lord Lieutenant of Cardiganshire – William Edward Powell
- Lord Lieutenant of Carmarthenshire – George Rice, 3rd Baron Dynevor
- Lord Lieutenant of Denbighshire – Sir Watkin Williams-Wynn, 5th Baronet
- Lord Lieutenant of Flintshire – Robert Grosvenor, 1st Marquess of Westminster
- Lord Lieutenant of Glamorgan – John Crichton-Stuart, 2nd Marquess of Bute
- Lord Lieutenant of Merionethshire – Sir Watkin Williams-Wynn, 5th Baronet
- Lord Lieutenant of Montgomeryshire – Edward Clive, 1st Earl of Powis
- Lord Lieutenant of Pembrokeshire – Sir John Owen, 1st Baronet
- Lord Lieutenant of Radnorshire – George Rodney, 3rd Baron Rodney
- Bishop of Bangor – Henry Majendie
- Bishop of Llandaff – William Van Mildert
- Bishop of St Asaph – John Luxmoore
- Bishop of St Davids – Thomas Burgess (until 17 June); John Jenkinson (from 24 July)

== Events ==
- 2 January – The square-rigged transatlantic ocean liner Diamond strikes Sarn Badrig in Cardigan Bay and sinks.
- unknown dates
  - The first public wharves are built at Portmadoc.
  - Rails for the Stockton and Darlington Railway (opened 27 September) are made at Ebbw Vale.
  - Publication of Seren Gomer moves to Carmarthen.
  - Sir Thomas Foley becomes an admiral.

== Arts and literature ==
=== New books ===
==== English language ====
- John Brickdale Blakeway and Hugh Owen – A History of Shrewsbury
- Felicia Hemans – The Forest Sanctuary
- Walter Scott – The Bethrothed

==== Welsh language ====
- John Davies (Brychan) – Y Gog
- Peter Bailey Williams – Tragwyddol Orphwysfa'r Saint

=== Music ===
- Jedediah Richards – Diddanwch y Pererinion

== Births ==
- 15 January – Eleazar Roberts, writer and musician (d. 1912)
- 25 January – Robert Piercy, civil engineer (d. 1894)
- 7 June – R. D. Blackmore, English novelist of Anglo-Welsh parentage (d. 1900)

== Deaths ==
- 12 February – John Humffreys Parry, antiquary, 39 (in a tavern brawl)
- 24 February – Thomas Bowdler, editor, 70
- 16 April – Hugh Jones (Maesglasau), hymn-writer, 75
- 2 May – Michael Hughes, industrialist, 72
- 9 June – Abraham Rees, encyclopaedist, 81
- 10 August – Joseph Harris (Gomer), Baptist minister, poet and editor, 52
- 12 September – Sir Thomas Stepney, 9th Baronet, groom of the bedchamber to Prince Frederick, Duke of York and Albany and last of his line, 65

== See also ==
- 1825 in Ireland
