= 1821 in Wales =

- Centuries: 17th; 18th; 19th; 20th; 21st
- Decades: 1800s; 1810s; 1820s; 1830s; 1840s
- See also: List of years in Wales; Timeline of Welsh history 1821 in The United Kingdom Scotland Elsewhere

This article is about the particular significance of the year 1821 to Wales and its people.

== Incumbents ==
- Lord Lieutenant of Anglesey – Henry Paget, 1st Marquess of Anglesey
- Lord Lieutenant of Brecknockshire and Monmouthshire – Henry Somerset, 6th Duke of Beaufort
- Lord Lieutenant of Caernarvonshire – Thomas Bulkeley, 7th Viscount Bulkeley
- Lord Lieutenant of Cardiganshire – William Edward Powell
- Lord Lieutenant of Carmarthenshire – George Rice, 3rd Baron Dynevor
- Lord Lieutenant of Denbighshire – Sir Watkin Williams-Wynn, 5th Baronet
- Lord Lieutenant of Flintshire – Robert Grosvenor, 1st Marquess of Westminster
- Lord Lieutenant of Glamorgan – John Crichton-Stuart, 2nd Marquess of Bute
- Lord Lieutenant of Merionethshire – Sir Watkin Williams-Wynn, 5th Baronet
- Lord Lieutenant of Montgomeryshire – Edward Clive, 1st Earl of Powis
- Lord Lieutenant of Pembrokeshire – Richard Philipps, 1st Baron Milford
- Lord Lieutenant of Radnorshire – George Rodney, 3rd Baron Rodney
- Bishop of Bangor – Henry Majendie
- Bishop of Llandaff – William Van Mildert
- Bishop of St Asaph – John Luxmoore
- Bishop of St Davids – Thomas Burgess

== Events ==
- 27 July – Sir Thomas Phillipps is created a baronet.
- 13 September – King George IV of the United Kingdom visits Brecon on his return from Ireland.
- November – The first edition of Y Dysgedydd appears.
- 1 March – The first gas street lighting in Wales is installed at Swansea.
- unknown date – William Madocks obtains an Act of Parliament allowing him to build a port, later known as Porthmadog.

== Arts and literature ==
=== New books ===
- John Elias – Golygiad Ysgrythurol ar Gyfiawnhad Pechadur
- Evan Evans (Ieuan Glan Geirionydd) – Pedwar Cyflwr Dyn (translation of a work by Thomas Boston
- David Richards (Dafydd Ionawr) – Cywydd y Dilyw

=== Music ===
- Joseph Harris (Gomer) – Casgliad o Hymnau (collection of hymns)

== Births ==
- 21 April – Thomas Stephens, historian, literary critic and social reformer (d. 1875)
- 1 May – William Latham Bevan, church historian (d. 1908)
- 24 June – Guillermo Rawson, Argentinian politician (d. 1890)
- 6 July – Henry Hussey Vivian, 1st Baron Swansea (d. 1894)
- 16 July – John Jones (Mathetes), preacher and writer (d. 1878)
- 14 November – John Owen (Owain Alaw), musician (d. 1883)
- 16 December - John Griffith, journalist writing under the pseudonym Y Gohebydd (d. 1877)
- date unknown - William Davies, politician (d. 1895)

== Deaths ==
- 16 February – Hugh Davies, botanist, 81
- 2 March - Benjamin Evans, Independent minister, 81
- 2 May – Hester Thrale, diarist, 80
- 21 May – John Jones (Jac Glan-y-gors), poet and satirist, 54
- 13 July – Sir Watkin Lewes, lord mayor of London, 81
- 7 August – Caroline of Brunswick, former Princess of Wales (1795–1820), 53
- 12 October - William Jones, evangelist, 65
- November – Richard Fenton, poet and author, 74

== See also ==
- 1821 in Ireland
