= 1823 in Wales =

- Centuries: 17th; 18th; 19th; 20th; 21st
- Decades: 1800s; 1810s; 1820s; 1830s; 1840s
- See also: List of years in Wales; Timeline of Welsh history 1823 in The United Kingdom Scotland Elsewhere

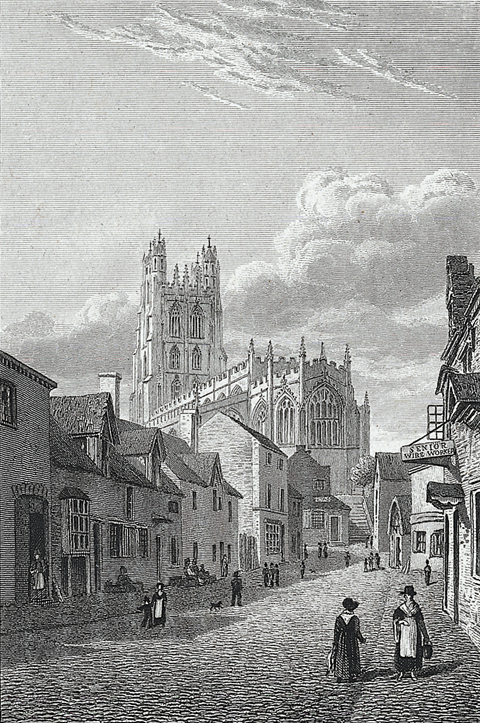
1823 engraving of cathedral in Wrexham

This article is about the particular significance of the year 1823 to Wales and its people.

== Incumbents ==
- Lord Lieutenant of Anglesey – Henry Paget, 1st Marquess of Anglesey
- Lord Lieutenant of Brecknockshire – Henry Somerset, 6th Duke of Beaufort
- Lord Lieutenant of Caernarvonshire – Thomas Assheton Smith
- Lord Lieutenant of Cardiganshire – William Edward Powell
- Lord Lieutenant of Carmarthenshire – George Rice, 3rd Baron Dynevor
- Lord Lieutenant of Denbighshire – Sir Watkin Williams-Wynn, 5th Baronet
- Lord Lieutenant of Flintshire – Robert Grosvenor, 1st Marquess of Westminster
- Lord Lieutenant of Glamorgan – John Crichton-Stuart, 2nd Marquess of Bute
- Lord Lieutenant of Merionethshire – Sir Watkin Williams-Wynn, 5th Baronet
- Lord Lieutenant of Montgomeryshire – Edward Clive, 1st Earl of Powis
- Lord Lieutenant of Pembrokeshire – Richard Philipps, 1st Baron Milford (until 28 November)
- Lord Lieutenant of Radnorshire – George Rodney, 3rd Baron Rodney
- Bishop of Bangor – Henry Majendie
- Bishop of Llandaff – William Van Mildert
- Bishop of St Asaph – John Luxmoore
- Bishop of St Davids – Thomas Burgess

== Events ==
- 13 January – Edward Paget, former MP for Caernarvon, is appointed Commander-in-Chief of British forces in India.
- 23 January – In Paviland Cave on the Gower Peninsula, William Buckland inspects the "Red Lady of Paviland", the first identification of a prehistoric (male) human burial (first discovered on 21 December last).
- February
  - John Frost is sentenced to six months in prison for a libel against the town clerk of Newport.
  - Mercy Whitney describes the burial, in Hawaii, of the infant son of Isaac and Elizabeth Peke Davis: "A regular procession of two and two followed the corpse. Going into the fort in which the grave was dug seemed like entering a burying ground, more so than anything I have witnessed since I left America."
- 4 March – Llanuwchllyn-born John Richards is elected to the United States Congress.
- 26 March – The packet ship Alert sinks off The Skerries, Isle of Anglesey, with the loss of a hundred lives.
- Summer – Stanley Embankment completed by Thomas Telford carrying the Holyhead road between Anglesey and Holy Island.
- 23 August – A major eisteddfod is held at Mold.
- unknown date
  - The Welsh Literary Society of Brecon is established by Thomas Price (Carnhuanawc).
  - The Presbyterian Church of Wales draws up a "Confession of Faith" and becomes a separate body.
  - The Caergwrle Bowl, a decorated Middle Bronze Age artefact, is discovered.

== Arts and literature ==
=== New books ===
- Felicia Hemans – The Siege of Valencia
- Huw Morys – Eos Ceiriog, sef casgliad o bêr ganiadau Huw Morus (posthumous, ed. Walter Davies)
- Ioan Siencyn – Casgliad o Ganiadau Difyr (posthumous)

=== Music ===
- David Charles – Hymnau ar Amrywiol Achosion (hymns)
- John Ellis – Eliot (hymn tune)

== Births ==
- 8 January – Alfred Russel Wallace, biologist (d. 1913)
- 11 February – Llewellyn Turner, politician (d. 1903)
- March – Rowland Williams (Hwfa Môn), poet and archdruid (d. 1905)
- 19 April – Anna Laetitia Waring, poet and hymn-writer (d. 1910)
- 17 November – Sir John Evans, archaeologist (d. 1908)
- December – Caroline Elizabeth Williams, radical and champion of women's rights (d. 1908)

== Deaths ==
- 26 February (in Switzerland) – John Philip Kemble, actor, brother of Sarah Siddons, 66
- 12 April – Diana Noel, 2nd Baroness Barham, philanthropist, 80
- 11 November – Sir Richard Richards, politician and judge, 71
- 28 November – Richard Philipps, 1st Baron Milford, landowner, 79
- 30 November – William Joseph Williams, American painter of Welsh parentage, 64
- 4 December – John Ryland Harris (Ieuan Ddu), printer, 20

== See also ==
- 1823 in Ireland
