= 1833 in Wales =

- Centuries: 17th; 18th; 19th; 20th; 21st
- Decades: 1810s; 1820s; 1830s; 1840s; 1850s
- See also: List of years in Wales; Timeline of Welsh history 1833 in The United Kingdom Scotland Elsewhere

This article is about the particular significance of the year 1833 to Wales and its people.

== Incumbents ==
- Lord Lieutenant of Anglesey – Henry Paget, 1st Marquess of Anglesey
- Lord Lieutenant of Brecknockshire – Henry Somerset, 6th Duke of Beaufort
- Lord Lieutenant of Caernarvonshire – Peter Drummond-Burrell, 22nd Baron Willoughby de Eresby
- Lord Lieutenant of Cardiganshire – William Edward Powell
- Lord Lieutenant of Carmarthenshire – George Rice, 3rd Baron Dynevor
- Lord Lieutenant of Denbighshire – Sir Watkin Williams-Wynn, 5th Baronet
- Lord Lieutenant of Flintshire – Robert Grosvenor, 1st Marquess of Westminster
- Lord Lieutenant of Glamorgan – John Crichton-Stuart, 2nd Marquess of Bute
- Lord Lieutenant of Merionethshire – Sir Watkin Williams-Wynn, 5th Baronet
- Lord Lieutenant of Montgomeryshire – Edward Herbert, 2nd Earl of Powis
- Lord Lieutenant of Pembrokeshire – Sir John Owen, 1st Baronet
- Lord Lieutenant of Radnorshire – George Rodney, 3rd Baron Rodney
- Bishop of Bangor – Christopher Bethell
- Bishop of Llandaff – Edward Copleston
- Bishop of St Asaph – William Carey
- Bishop of St Davids – John Jenkinson

== Events ==
- 29 January – In the United Kingdom general election, Sir John Edwards, 1st Baronet, defeats Tory candidate Panton Corbett to win the enlarged constituency of Montgomery for the Liberals.
- 2 April – Launch of HMS Royal William at Pembroke Dock. This is the first ship to be built there with over 100 guns.
- 26 May – John Etherington Welch Rolls of The Hendre, Monmouth, marries Elizabeth Long, granddaughter of the 7th Earl of Northesk. They are the parents of John Rolls, 1st Baron Llangattock.
- 29 July – Lady Charlotte Bertie marries John Josiah Guest.
- Autumn – The community of Gomer, Ohio, is founded in the United States by Welsh settlers.
- date unknown
  - Isaac Williams becomes Dean of Trinity College, Oxford.
  - Adrian Stephens invents the steam whistle as a safety device for use at Dowlais Ironworks; he fails to patent it.
  - Abbey Cwmhir Hall is constructed on the site of an earlier house.

== Arts and literature ==
- Mold cape discovered.

=== New books ===
- Sir Harford Jones Brydges – Dynasty of the Kajars, translated from the original Persian manuscript
- Eliza Constantia Campbell – Stories from the History of Wales

=== Music ===
- David James – Myfyrdawd

== Births ==
- 10 January – Richard Davies (Mynyddog), poet (d. 1877)
- 23 January – Sir Lewis Morris, poet (d. 1907)
- 29 January – David John, Mormon leader (d. 1908 in Utah)
- February – Jacob Thomas, VC recipient (d. 1911)
- 6 July – David Hugh Jones (Dewi Arfon), poet (d. 1869)
- 12 July – John Hugh Evans, Wesleyan minister and temperance campaigner (d. 1886)
- 20 August – General Sir James Hills-Johnes, military leader (d. 1919)

== Deaths ==
- 9 January – Sir Thomas Foley, admiral, 75
- 29 January – Thomas Evans, poet, 66
- 6 February – Robert Waithman, lord mayor of London, 69
- 26 February – Richard Jones, minister and writer, 61
- 4 May – William Morgan, scientist and actuary 82
- 16 August – John Edwards-Vaughan, politician, 61
- 1 October – Thomas Beynon, archdeacon of Cardigan and patron of the arts, 88

== See also ==
- 1833 in Ireland
