= 1829 in Wales =

- Centuries: 17th; 18th; 19th; 20th; 21st
- Decades: 1800s; 1810s; 1820s; 1830s; 1840s
- See also: List of years in Wales; Timeline of Welsh history 1829 in The United Kingdom Scotland Elsewhere

This article is about the particular significance of the year 1829 to Wales and its people.

== Incumbents ==
- Lord Lieutenant of Anglesey – Henry Paget, 1st Marquess of Anglesey
- Lord Lieutenant of Brecknockshire – Henry Somerset, 6th Duke of Beaufort
- Lord Lieutenant of Caernarvonshire – Peter Drummond-Burrell, 22nd Baron Willoughby de Eresby
- Lord Lieutenant of Cardiganshire – William Edward Powell
- Lord Lieutenant of Carmarthenshire – George Rice, 3rd Baron Dynevor
- Lord Lieutenant of Denbighshire – Sir Watkin Williams-Wynn, 5th Baronet
- Lord Lieutenant of Flintshire – Robert Grosvenor, 1st Marquess of Westminster
- Lord Lieutenant of Glamorgan – John Crichton-Stuart, 2nd Marquess of Bute
- Lord Lieutenant of Merionethshire – Sir Watkin Williams-Wynn, 5th Baronet
- Lord Lieutenant of Montgomeryshire – Edward Clive, 1st Earl of Powis
- Lord Lieutenant of Pembrokeshire – Sir John Owen, 1st Baronet
- Lord Lieutenant of Radnorshire – George Rodney, 3rd Baron Rodney
- Bishop of Bangor – Henry Majendie
- Bishop of Llandaff – Edward Copleston
- Bishop of St Asaph – John Luxmoore
- Bishop of St Davids – John Jenkinson

== Events ==
- January - The first issue of the Cambrian Quarterly Magazine and Celtic Repertory appears.
- 6 May - The Cymmrodorion hold an eisteddfod in London.
- 24 November - The Ecclesiastical Courts Act, 1829, is passed, largely at the instigation of Sir John Nicholl.
- Formation of the North Wales and South Wales MMs (monthly meetings) by the Society of Friends.
- Beaumaris Gaol is built, to the design of Joseph Hansom.

== Arts and literature ==
=== New books ===
- Ellis Evans - Arddangosiad Syml o Syniadau Gwahaniaethol, neu Egwyddorion Priodol, y Bedyddwyr Crediniol
- John Jones (Tegid) - A Defence of the Reformed System of Welsh Orthography
- Thomas Love Peacock - The Misfortunes of Elphin
- Thomas Price (Carnhuanawc) - An Essay on the Physiognomy and Physiology of the Present Inhabitants of Britain

=== Music ===
- Felix Mendelssohn visits Wales and transcribes some Welsh music.

== Births ==
- 27 January - Isaac Roberts, astronomer (d. 1904)
- 28 August - Samuel C. Hughes, Welsh-born American businessman and politician (d. 1917)
- 20 December - Morgan Jones, cricketer (d. 1905)
- 23 December - Thomas Walter Price (Cuhelyn), journalist and poet (d. 1869)
- unknown date - G. Phillips Bevan, statistician (d. 1889)

== Deaths ==
- 26 January - Benjamin Millingchamp, collector of manuscripts, 72
- June - Elizabeth Randles, harpist, 28?
- 19 August - Jonathan Williams, antiquary, 77
- 20 November - John Jenkins (Ifor Ceri), antiquary, 59

== See also ==
- 1829 in Ireland
