= 1827 in Wales =

- Centuries: 17th; 18th; 19th; 20th; 21st
- Decades: 1800s; 1810s; 1820s; 1830s; 1840s
- See also: List of years in Wales; Timeline of Welsh history 1827 in The United Kingdom Scotland Elsewhere

This article is about the particular significance of the year 1827 to Wales and its people.

== Incumbents ==
- Lord Lieutenant of Anglesey – Henry Paget, 1st Marquess of Anglesey
- Lord Lieutenant of Brecknockshire – Henry Somerset, 6th Duke of Beaufort
- Lord Lieutenant of Caernarvonshire – Thomas Assheton Smith
- Lord Lieutenant of Cardiganshire – William Edward Powell
- Lord Lieutenant of Carmarthenshire – George Rice, 3rd Baron Dynevor
- Lord Lieutenant of Denbighshire – Sir Watkin Williams-Wynn, 5th Baronet
- Lord Lieutenant of Flintshire – Robert Grosvenor, 1st Marquess of Westminster
- Lord Lieutenant of Glamorgan – John Crichton-Stuart, 2nd Marquess of Bute
- Lord Lieutenant of Merionethshire – Sir Watkin Williams-Wynn, 5th Baronet
- Lord Lieutenant of Montgomeryshire – Edward Clive, 1st Earl of Powis
- Lord Lieutenant of Pembrokeshire – Sir John Owen, 1st Baronet
- Lord Lieutenant of Radnorshire – George Rodney, 3rd Baron Rodney
- Bishop of Bangor – Henry Majendie
- Bishop of Llandaff – Charles Sumner (until 12 December); Edward Copleston
- Bishop of St Asaph – John Luxmoore
- Bishop of St Davids – John Jenkinson

== Events ==
- 1 March – Official opening of St David's College, Lampeter. Llewelyn Lewellin becomes its first principal, with Alfred Ollivant as vice-principal.
- 25 April – Sir Stapleton Cotton is created Viscount Combermere.
- 6 November – The Welsh-language journal, Baner y Groes, is launched for the first time; it would be revived in 1854.
- date unknown
  - The nephew of the last Viscount Bulkeley obtains permission, by royal licence, to take the name Sir Richard Bulkeley Williams-Bulkeley.
  - Construction work begins on Marble Arch, designed by Welsh architect John Nash and erected in front of Buckingham Palace in London.
  - A source of manganese is discovered at Y Rhiw.

== Arts and literature ==
=== New books ===
- Robert Davies (Bardd Nantglyn) – Diliau Barddas
- John Jones – An Explanation of the Greek Article

=== Music ===
- Peroriaeth Hyfryd (collection of hymns including Caersalem by Robert Edwards)

== Births ==
- 6 June – Hugh Robert Hughes, genealogist (d. 1911)
- 17 September - Joseph David Jones, composer (d. 1870)
- 27 October – Joseph Tudor Hughes (Blegwryd), harp prodigy (d. 1841)
- 18 November – Emmeline Lewis Lloyd, Alpinist (d. 1913)
- date unknown - Griffith Arthur Jones, clergyman (d. 1906)

== Deaths ==
- 10 January – John Jones, Unitarian minister and writer, about 60
- 25 January – John Evans, Baptist minister and writer, 59
- 12 May – David Richards (Dafydd Ionawr), poet, 76
- 27 May – Maria Bailey, wife of Sir Joseph Bailey
- 3 July – David Davis (Castellhywel), minister and poet, 82
- 22 July – William Aubrey, engineer, supervisor of Cyfarthfa ironworks, 68
- 11 August – Anthony Bushby Bacon, industrialist, about 55
- date unknown - Helen Maria Williams, novelist and poet (in Paris)

== See also ==
- 1827 in Ireland
