= 1828 in Wales =

- Centuries: 17th; 18th; 19th; 20th; 21st
- Decades: 1800s; 1810s; 1820s; 1830s; 1840s
- See also: List of years in Wales; Timeline of Welsh history 1828 in The United Kingdom Scotland Elsewhere

This article is about the particular significance of the year 1828 to Wales and its people.

== Incumbents ==
- Lord Lieutenant of Anglesey – Henry Paget, 1st Marquess of Anglesey
- Lord Lieutenant of Brecknockshire – Henry Somerset, 6th Duke of Beaufort
- Lord Lieutenant of Caernarvonshire – Thomas Assheton Smith (until 12 May); Peter Drummond-Burrell, 22nd Baron Willoughby de Eresby (from 25 November)
- Lord Lieutenant of Cardiganshire – William Edward Powell
- Lord Lieutenant of Carmarthenshire – George Rice, 3rd Baron Dynevor
- Lord Lieutenant of Denbighshire – Sir Watkin Williams-Wynn, 5th Baronet
- Lord Lieutenant of Flintshire – Robert Grosvenor, 1st Marquess of Westminster
- Lord Lieutenant of Glamorgan – John Crichton-Stuart, 2nd Marquess of Bute
- Lord Lieutenant of Merionethshire – Sir Watkin Williams-Wynn, 5th Baronet
- Lord Lieutenant of Montgomeryshire – Edward Clive, 1st Earl of Powis
- Lord Lieutenant of Pembrokeshire – Sir John Owen, 1st Baronet
- Lord Lieutenant of Radnorshire – George Rodney, 3rd Baron Rodney
- Bishop of Bangor – Henry Majendie
- Bishop of Llandaff – Edward Copleston
- Bishop of St Asaph – John Luxmoore
- Bishop of St Davids – John Jenkinson

== Events ==
- 1 June - The Saundersfoot Railway and Harbour Company is formed.
- 19 June - The Llanelly Dock is established by Act of Parliament.
- September - Prince Augustus Frederick, Duke of Sussex, visits the eisteddfod at Denbigh, making it the first to receive a royal visit.
- unknown dates
  - An iron suspension bridge is built to link South Stack with Holy Island, Anglesey.
  - David Owen (Brutus) becomes editor of the periodical Lleuad yr Oes at Aberystwyth.

== Arts and literature ==
=== New books ===
- Ellis Evans - Unoliaeth a Gweledigaeth yr Eglwys, sef, Llythyr Cymanfa Cefn Mawr
- T. J. Llewelyn Prichard - The Adventures and Vagaries of Twm Shon Catti, descriptive of life in Wales; interspersed with poems
- David Saunders (Dafydd Glan Teifi) - Awdl ar Fordaith yr Apostol Paul
- John Thomas - Telyn y Cantorion
- John Walters - An English and Welsh Dictionary
- Thomas Wiliam - Cwyn yr Unig

=== Music ===
- William Owen (Gwilym Ddu Glan Hafren) - Y Caniedydd Crefyddol (collection of hymn tunes)

== Births ==
- 30 January - John David Jenkins, philanthropist (d. 1876)
- 4 March - Owen Wynne Jones (Glasynys), clergyman and writer (d. 1870)
- 13 March - Thomas Morgan Thomas, missionary (d. 1884)
- 6 May - Sir Hugh Rowlands, soldier (d. 1909)
- 4 June - David Thomas (Dewi Hefin), poet (d. 1909)
- 23 September - Charles James Watkin Williams, politician (d. 1884)
- 30 October - Henry James, 1st Baron James of Hereford, lawyer and statesman (d. 1911)
- 13 December - David Lewis Wooding, genealogist (d. 1891)
- date unknown
  - John Richard Hughes, evangelist (d. 1893)
  - John Pryce, clergyman and writer (d. 1903)

== Deaths ==
- 19 February - Thomas Jones (Y Bardd Cloff), 59
- 29 March - Griffith Rowlands, surgeon, 65
- 12 May - Thomas Assheton Smith I, industrialist, 75
- 15 September - William Madocks, landowner, 55
- 4 October - Sir Thomas Hanmer, 2nd Baronet, politician, 46/47
- 29 December - Priscilla Bertie, 21st Baroness Willoughby de Eresby, 67
- date unknown - Edward Charles (Siamas Gwynedd), writer, 70?

== See also ==
- 1828 in Ireland
