= 1832 in Wales =

- Centuries: 17th; 18th; 19th; 20th; 21st
- Decades: 1810s; 1820s; 1830s; 1840s; 1850s
- See also: List of years in Wales; Timeline of Welsh history 1832 in The United Kingdom Scotland Elsewhere

This article is about the particular significance of the year 1832 to Wales and its people.

== Incumbents ==
- Lord Lieutenant of Anglesey – Henry Paget, 1st Marquess of Anglesey
- Lord Lieutenant of Brecknockshire – Henry Somerset, 6th Duke of Beaufort
- Lord Lieutenant of Caernarvonshire – Peter Drummond-Burrell, 22nd Baron Willoughby de Eresby
- Lord Lieutenant of Cardiganshire – William Edward Powell
- Lord Lieutenant of Carmarthenshire – George Rice, 3rd Baron Dynevor
- Lord Lieutenant of Denbighshire – Sir Watkin Williams-Wynn, 5th Baronet
- Lord Lieutenant of Flintshire – Robert Grosvenor, 1st Marquess of Westminster
- Lord Lieutenant of Glamorgan – John Crichton-Stuart, 2nd Marquess of Bute
- Lord Lieutenant of Merionethshire – Sir Watkin Williams-Wynn, 5th Baronet
- Lord Lieutenant of Montgomeryshire – Edward Herbert, 2nd Earl of Powis
- Lord Lieutenant of Pembrokeshire – Sir John Owen, 1st Baronet
- Lord Lieutenant of Radnorshire – George Rodney, 3rd Baron Rodney
- Bishop of Bangor – Christopher Bethell
- Bishop of Llandaff – Edward Copleston
- Bishop of St Asaph – William Carey
- Bishop of St Davids – John Jenkinson

== Events ==
- 13 January — The Welshman (newspaper) is first published in Carmarthen.
- May — Second cholera pandemic reaches Wales, at Flint.
- 23 May — The Festiniog Railway Company is set up by an act of Parliament, making it, as of the 21st century, the world's oldest surviving statutory public railway company.
- August - Princess Victoria and her mother, the Duchess of Kent, visit Wynnstay.
- 28 August - At the Beaumaris eisteddfod, the title of Archdruid is used for the first time.
- 8 December–8 January 1833 — In the 1832 United Kingdom general election, the first following the Reform Act 1832, John Josiah Guest becomes the first MP for the new constituency of Merthyr Boroughs.
- The first temperance society in Wales is founded at Holyhead.
- Wrexham Infirmary is founded at the instigation of Thomas Taylor Griffith.
- New Cardiff Prison opens.
- Walter Coffin opens the "Rhondda No. 3" coal seam.

== Arts and literature ==
=== New books ===
- Benjamin Jones (P A Môn) — Amddiffyniad o Brynedigaeth Neillduol
- Jedediah Richards — Addysg ac Amddiffyniad

== Births ==
- 5 January – Love Jones-Parry, politician and Patagonian settler (d. 1891)
- 1 February – John Bryant, harpist (d. 1926)
- 3 April – William Thomas (Islwyn), poet (d. 1878)
- 25 September – John Ceiriog Hughes, poet (d. 1887)
- 4 November – James James (Iago ap Ieuan), harpist and composer (d. 1902)
- 19 November – Benjamin Thomas Williams, lawyer and politician (d. 1890)
- 17 December – Thomas McKenny Hughes, geologist (d. 1917)
- date unknown – William Williams, veterinary surgeon (d. 1900)

== Deaths ==
- 23 February – Owen Williams (MP), 67
- 16 July – Jemima Nicholas, heroine, 82
- 14 August – Evan Pritchard (Ieuan Lleyn), poet, 63
- 18 November – William Howels or Howells, evangelical preacher, 54

== See also ==
- 1832 in Ireland
