= 1823 in Ireland =

- Centuries: 17th; 18th; 19th; 20th; 21st
- Decades: 1800s; 1810s; 1820s; 1830s; 1840s
- See also: 1823 in the United Kingdom; Other events of 1823; List of years in Ireland

Events from the year 1823 in Ireland.

== Events ==
- Catholic Association formed by Daniel O'Connell, to further Catholic emancipation.
- October – HMS Essex, a former American frigate of 1799, is hulked at Cork to serve as a prison ship; from 1824 to 1834 she serves in this capacity at Kingstown.

== Arts and literature ==
- 5 August – the Royal Hibernian Academy of Painting, Sculpture, and Architecture is established by letters patent in Dublin.

== Births ==
- 1 January – Edward Butler, lawyer and politician in Australia (died 1879).
- 12 January – James Donnelly, Bishop of the Diocese of Clogher (died 1893).
- 23 January – Abraham Fitzgibbon, railway civil engineer in the British empire (died 1887 in England)
- 26 March – Ann Jellicoe, educationalist (died 1880).
- 7 July – John Kells Ingram, poet, scholar, economist and historian of economic thought (died 1907).
- 7 September – Kevin Izod O'Doherty, transported to Australia in 1849, physician and politician (died 1905).
- 10 September – James O'Connor, first Archbishop of the Roman Catholic Archdiocese of Omaha (died 1890).
- 16 September – James O'Reilly, lawyer and politician in Canada (died 1875).
  Full date unknown
  - Thomas Devin Reilly, revolutionary, Young Irelander and journalist (died 1854).
  - John Ryan, soldier, recipient of the Victoria Cross for gallantry in 1857 at Lucknow, India, killed in action (died 1858).

== Deaths ==
- 21 February – Charles Wolfe, poet (born 1791).
- 17 September – John Shaw, Captain in the United States Navy (born 1773).

== See also ==
- 1823 in Scotland
- 1823 in Wales
