= Joseph Davies (magazine editor) =

Welsh Solicitor

Joseph Davies (? – 1831?) was a Welsh solicitor and magazine publisher. He was originally from the Builth Wells area, but trained as a solicitor and took up a position with a firm in Liverpool. He was the founding editor of the monthly periodical Y Brud a Sylwydd, eight editions of which were published between January and August 1828. He invented a large number of novel Welsh words that he thought were needed to modernise the language.
