= 1897 in Wales =

- Centuries: 17th; 18th; 19th; 20th; 21st
- Decades: 1870s; 1880s; 1890s; 1900s; 1910s
- See also: List of years in Wales; Timeline of Welsh history 1897 in The United Kingdom Scotland Elsewhere

This article is about the particular significance of the year 1897 to Wales and its people.

== Incumbents ==
- Archdruid of the National Eisteddfod of Wales – Hwfa Môn
- Lord Lieutenant of Anglesey – Sir Richard Henry Williams-Bulkeley, 12th Baronet
- Lord Lieutenant of Brecknockshire – Joseph Bailey, 1st Baron Glanusk
- Lord Lieutenant of Caernarvonshire – John Ernest Greaves
- Lord Lieutenant of Cardiganshire – Herbert Davies-Evans
- Lord Lieutenant of Carmarthenshire – John Campbell, 2nd Earl Cawdor
- Lord Lieutenant of Denbighshire – William Cornwallis-West
- Lord Lieutenant of Flintshire – Hugh Robert Hughes
- Lord Lieutenant of Glamorgan – Robert Windsor-Clive, 1st Earl of Plymouth
- Lord Lieutenant of Merionethshire – W. R. M. Wynne
- Lord Lieutenant of Monmouthshire – Henry Somerset, 8th Duke of Beaufort
- Lord Lieutenant of Montgomeryshire – Sir Herbert Williams-Wynn, 7th Baronet
- Lord Lieutenant of Pembrokeshire – Frederick Campbell, 3rd Earl Cawdor
- Lord Lieutenant of Radnorshire – Powlett Milbank
- Bishop of Bangor – Daniel Lewis Lloyd
- Bishop of Llandaff – Richard Lewis
- Bishop of St Asaph – A. G. Edwards (later Archbishop of Wales)
- Bishop of St Davids – Basil Jones (until 14 January); John Owen (from 1 May)

== Events ==
- January – Sir Owen Morgan Edwards founds the periodical Heddyw, published in Wrexham.
- 9 April – The Snowdon Mountain Railway resumes operation, a year after a fatal accident on its maiden run.
- c. May – The Plynlimon and Hafan Tramway opens.
- 13 May – Guglielmo Marconi sends the first ever wireless communication over water, from Lavernock Point to Flat Holm.
- 2 June – The first Jubilee Bridge (Queensferry) across the River Dee is opened by William Gladstone.
- 20 June – Celebration of Queen Victoria's Diamond Jubilee is muted in Nonconformist parts of Wales, as the date falls on a Sunday.
- July – The Grand Theatre, Swansea, is opened by Adelina Patti.
- 30 September – Inauguration of Beacons Reservoir water supply to Cardiff.
- 9 October – Opening of the Tal-y-cafn Bridge across the River Conwy.
- November – Four Customs officers are rescued from the River Usk, near Newport's Alexandra Dock pier-head after their boat capsizes.
- 12 November – Llanfyllin County School is opened by Mrs. John Marshall Dugdale and becomes the sixth Intermediate School in Montgomeryshire. Politician Clement Davies is one of the first pupils.
- unknown dates
  - A roller coaster erected on Barry Island, origin of Barry Island Pleasure Park.
  - Construction work is completed on the Pierhead Building as offices for Cardiff Docks.
  - Weaver's Mill, Swansea, a flour mill and corn storage depot, becomes the first building in the UK to be constructed from reinforced concrete, by L. G. Mouchel of Briton Ferry.
  - Merthyr Tydfil is refused a town charter; it is eventually granted one in 1905.
  - Opening of the Canterbury Building at St David's College, Lampeter (demolished in 1971).
  - Edgeworth David leads the Royal Society's expedition to the coral atoll of Funafuti.

== Arts and literature ==
=== Awards ===
National Eisteddfod of Wales – held at Newport

- Chair – John Thomas Job, "Brawdgarwch"
- Crown – Thomas Mafonwy Davies, "Arthur y Ford Gron"

=== New books ===
==== English language ====
- Owen Rhoscomyl – The White Rose of Arno
- John William Willis-Bund – The Celtic Church of Wales
- Alfred Neobard Palmer – Owen Tanat

==== Welsh language ====
- Caniadau Cymru (anthology)
- John Cadvan Davies – Caneuon Cadvan
- Ellis Pierce – Teulu'r Gilfach

=== Graphic arts ===
- 5 August – French-born painter Alfred Sisley marries his long-time partner Eugénie ("Marie") Lescouezec at Cardiff Register Office. They stay at Penarth, where Sisley paints at least six oils of the sea and the cliffs. In mid-August they move to the Osborne Hotel at Langland Bay on the Gower Peninsula, where he produces at least eleven oil paintings in and around Langland Bay and Rotherslade (at this time called Lady's Cove). They return to France in October.

=== Music ===
- Walford Davies – Overture in D minor
- Llyfr Hymnau a Thonau y Methodistiaid Calfinaidd (collection of hymns)

=== Film ===
- Arthur Cheetham begins making films in Wales.

== Sport ==
- Rugby Union – Due to an argument with the International Football Rugby Board the Welsh Rugby Union withdraws from the organisation and Wales do not play international rugby for 12 months.
- Swimming – The Welsh Amateur Swimming Association is founded. The first Welsh championships take place, with events for men only.

== Births ==
- 3 April – Frank Evans, dual-code international rugby player (died 1972)
- 5 April – Ness Edwards, politician (died 1968)
- 21 April – Albert Stock, Wales international rugby player (died 1969)
- 22 June – Kathleen Freeman, classical scholar (died 1959)
- 21 August – Victor Nash-Williams, archaeologist (died 1955)
- 28 September – Harry Beadles, Wales international footballer (died 1958)
- 15 November – Aneurin Bevan, politician (died 1960)
- 31 December – Rhys Williams, politician (died 1969)

== Deaths ==
- 14 January – William Basil Jones, Bishop of St David's, 75
- 30 January – Sarah Thomas, centenarian, 109
- 3 February – David Pugh Evans, songwriter, 31
- 2 March – Evan Owen Phillips, Dean of St David's, 70
- 1 April – William Gwynn, Rugby union international
- 16 April – Thomas Lewis, Welsh-born Australian politician, 75
- 10 May – Walter Evans, footballer, about 30
- 12 May – Thomas Llewellyn Thomas, linguist, 56
- June – Hugh Jones, Archdeacon of St Asaph, 81
- 1 September – John Griffiths, Archdeacon of Llandaff, 77
- 6 September – Thomas Rees Morgan, engineer, 63
- 8 September – James Milo Griffith, sculptor, 54
- 16 September – Edward Edwards (Pencerdd Ceredigion), musician, 83
- 20 September – Hugh Morris, footballer, 25 (tuberculosis)
- 15 October – Charles John Vaughan, former Dean of Llandaff, 81
- 12 November – Isaac Evans, trade union leader and politician, 49 (post-operative complications)
- 24 November – Arthur James Herbert, Quartermaster-General, 77
- 2 December – Thomas Lewis, politician, 76
- 4 December – Griffith Rhys Jones ("Caradog"), choral conductor, 62

== See also ==
- 1897 in Ireland
