= 1891 in Wales =

- Centuries: 17th; 18th; 19th; 20th; 21st
- Decades: 1870s; 1880s; 1890s; 1900s; 1910s
- See also: List of years in Wales; Timeline of Welsh history 1891 in The United Kingdom Scotland Elsewhere

This article is about the particular significance of the year 1891 to Wales and its people.

== Incumbents ==
- Archdruid of the National Eisteddfod of Wales – Clwydfardd
- Lord Lieutenant of Anglesey – Richard Davies
- Lord Lieutenant of Brecknockshire – Joseph Bailey, 1st Baron Glanusk
- Lord Lieutenant of Caernarvonshire – John Ernest Greaves
- Lord Lieutenant of Cardiganshire – Herbert Davies-Evans
- Lord Lieutenant of Carmarthenshire – John Campbell, 2nd Earl Cawdor
- Lord Lieutenant of Denbighshire – William Cornwallis-West
- Lord Lieutenant of Flintshire – Hugh Robert Hughes
- Lord Lieutenant of Glamorgan – Robert Windsor-Clive, 1st Earl of Plymouth
- Lord Lieutenant of Merionethshire – Robert Davies Pryce
- Lord Lieutenant of Monmouthshire – Henry Somerset, 8th Duke of Beaufort
- Lord Lieutenant of Montgomeryshire – Edward Herbert, 3rd Earl of Powis
- Lord Lieutenant of Pembrokeshire – William Edwardes, 4th Baron Kensington
- Lord Lieutenant of Radnorshire – Arthur Walsh, 2nd Baron Ormathwaite
- Bishop of Bangor – Daniel Lewis Lloyd
- Bishop of Llandaff – Richard Lewis
- Bishop of St Asaph – Alfred George Edwards
- Bishop of St Davids – Basil Jones

== Events ==
- 5 April – The United Kingdom Census (the first to record what languages are spoken in Wales by everyone over the age of three) shows there to be 1,685,614 speakers of Welsh in Wales, 54.4% of the population.
- 12 August – Adelina Patti opens her private theatre at Craig-y-Nos Castle.
- date unknown – The South Wales and Monmouthshire Training School of Cookery and the Domestic Arts opens in Cardiff.
- Owen Morgan Edwards launches his popular monthly magazine Cymru.

== Arts and literature ==
=== Awards ===
National Eisteddfod of Wales – held at Swansea

- Chair – John Owen Williams, "Yr Haul"
- Crown – David Adams

=== New books ===
==== English language ====
- George Essex Evans – The Repentance of Magdalene Despar and other poems
- William Nicholas Johns – History of the Church of S. Gwynllyw (S. Woolos, Newport)
- Edward Jones – Y Gymdeithasfa

==== Welsh language ====
- Charles Ashton – Bywyd ac Amserau yr Esgob Morgan
- Thomas Edwards – Darllen a Siarad
- Daniel Owen – Enoc Huws

== Sport ==
- Football – The Welsh Cup is won by Shrewsbury Town.

== Births ==
- 4 January – Bryn Lewis, Wales international rugby player (killed in action 1917)
- 13 February – Kate Roberts, author (died 1985)
- 14 February – Gwynn Parry Jones, tenor (died 1963)
- 14 March – Billy Geen, Wales international rugby union player (killed in action 1915)
- 29 March – Tom Parker, Wales international rugby union captain (died 1967)
- 8 April – Bill Beynon, British bantamweight boxing champion (died 1932)
- 9 May – Fred Perrett, Wales international rugby union (died of wounds 1918)
- 1 October – Morfydd Llwyn Owen, composer, pianist and mezzo-soprano (died 1918)
- 29 November – Glyn Stephens, Wales international rugby union captain (died 1965)

== Deaths ==
- 6 January – Hugh Owen Thomas, pioneering orthopaedic surgeon, 57
- 13 February – William Davies, palaeontologist, 76
- 25 February – William Frost, harpist 44
- 26 February – David James Jenkins, shipowner and politician, 66
- 18 March – John Basson Humffray, politician, 66
- 2 May – David Lewis Wooding, genealogist, 62
- 7 May – Edward Herbert, 3rd Earl of Powis, 72
- 10 May – Thomas Richard Lloyd, Anglican clergyman, 70/71
- 4 July – John Rowlands (Giraldus), antiquary, author and teacher, 67
- 5 September – Sir Hugh Owen Owen, 2nd Baronet, politician, 87
- 26 September – David Charles Davies, Nonconformist leader, 65
- 29 September – Lewys Glyn Dyfi (Lewis Meredith), preacher and writer, 65
- 23 November – Evan Evans, academic, 78
- 18 December – Sir Love Jones-Parry, politician, 59
- 24 December – Richard Owens, architect, 60

== See also ==
- 1891 in Ireland
