= William Van Mildert =

Bishop of Durham, England (1765–1836)

The Right Reverend William van Mildert
- Bishop of Durham
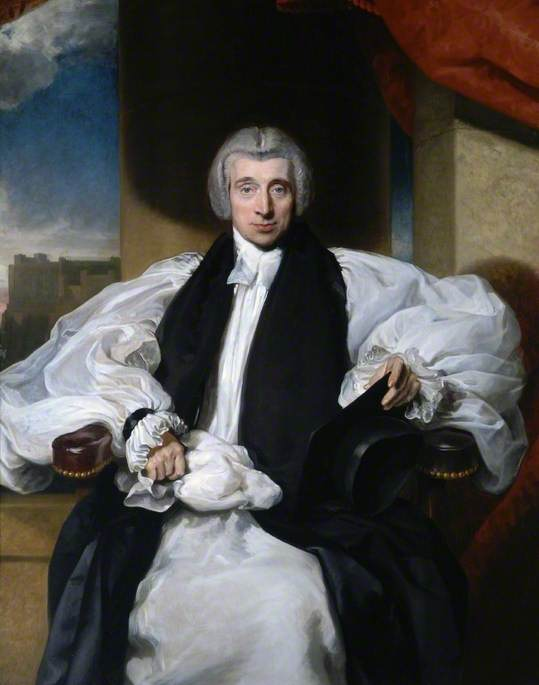
- Portrait by Thomas Lawrence
- Diocese: Diocese of Durham
- In office: 1826–1836 (death)
- Predecessor: Shute Barrington
- Successor: Edward Maltby
- Other posts: Bishop of Llandaff (1819–1826); Dean of St Paul's (1820–1826)

Personal details
- Born: 6 November 1765 Blackman Street, London
- Died: 21 February 1836 (aged 70) Auckland Castle
- Buried: Durham Cathedral
- Denomination: Anglican
- Spouse: Jane Douglas (m.1795)
- Profession: Church of England
- Education: Merchant Taylors' School
- Alma mater: The Queen's College, Oxford

William van Mildert (6 November 1765 – 21 February 1836) was the bishop of Durham (1826–1836), and the last to rule the county palatine of Durham. He was also one of the founders of the University of Durham, where he is commemorated in the names of Van Mildert College, founded in 1965, and the Van Mildert Professor of Divinity.

== Life ==
He was the son of Cornelius van Mildert, a gin distiller, and his wife Martha née Hill. Cornelius van Mildert was the great-grandson of an Amsterdam merchant who migrated to London around 1670, Martha the daughter of William Hill of Vauxhall, Surrey, merchant and financier. William van Mildert was educated at St Saviour's Grammar School and Merchant Taylors' School. He matriculated at the Queen's College, Oxford in 1784, graduating B.A. 1787, M.A. 1790, B.D. & D.D. 1813. He delivered the Boyle Lectures in 1804 and the Bampton Lectures in 1814, and was Regius Professor of Divinity at Oxford and a canon of Christ Church, Oxford from 1813 to 1820.

Loosely attached to the high church party, he was appointed Bishop of Llandaff from 1819 to 1826, a post which he held in commendam with the Deanery of St Paul's between 1820 and 1826, when he was translated to Durham. Prior to this, he was in 1790 the curate of Witham, Essex, where he met Jane (1760–1837), daughter of General Douglas, whom he married in 1795. He became rector of the church of St. Mary-le-Bow in London in 1796. Van Mildert is often described as a 'stormy petrel' on account of his outspoken expression of his views. As Bishop of Llandaff he broke with the practice of his predecessors and actually resided in the diocese. As the bishop's palace had fallen to ruin, he rented Coldbrook House near Abergavenny. During his time in Llandaff, he gained a reputation as "a conscientious diocesan".

As part of the University of Durham's foundation, behind which he was the driving force, he gave Durham Castle to the university, where it became the home of University College. Auckland Castle therefore became the sole residence of the Bishop of Durham. In addition, he donated a large number of buildings on Palace Green, between the castle and the cathedral. These are currently in use by various departments of the university (principally law, music and a small portion of the University Library).

In 1833, he gave 5 acres of land and a lot previously used as a burial pit during the 1831 Cholera Outbreak to the town of Stockton. Using funds allocated during the Church Building Act 1818, he ordered the construction of the gothic style Holy Trinity Church. This site is now in ruin, and is a Grade II* listed building in the park of Trinity Green. Van Mildert had a substantial library, sold at auction by Wheatley in London on 15 June 1836 (and nine following days), comprising 2138 lots; a copy of the catalogue is held at Cambridge University Library (shelfmark Munby.c.153(11)).

Van Mildert was the last Bishop of Durham with significant temporal powers. Those de jure vestiges of feudal jurisprudence were removed and returned to the Crown after his death in 1836 by the Durham (County Palatine) Act 1836.

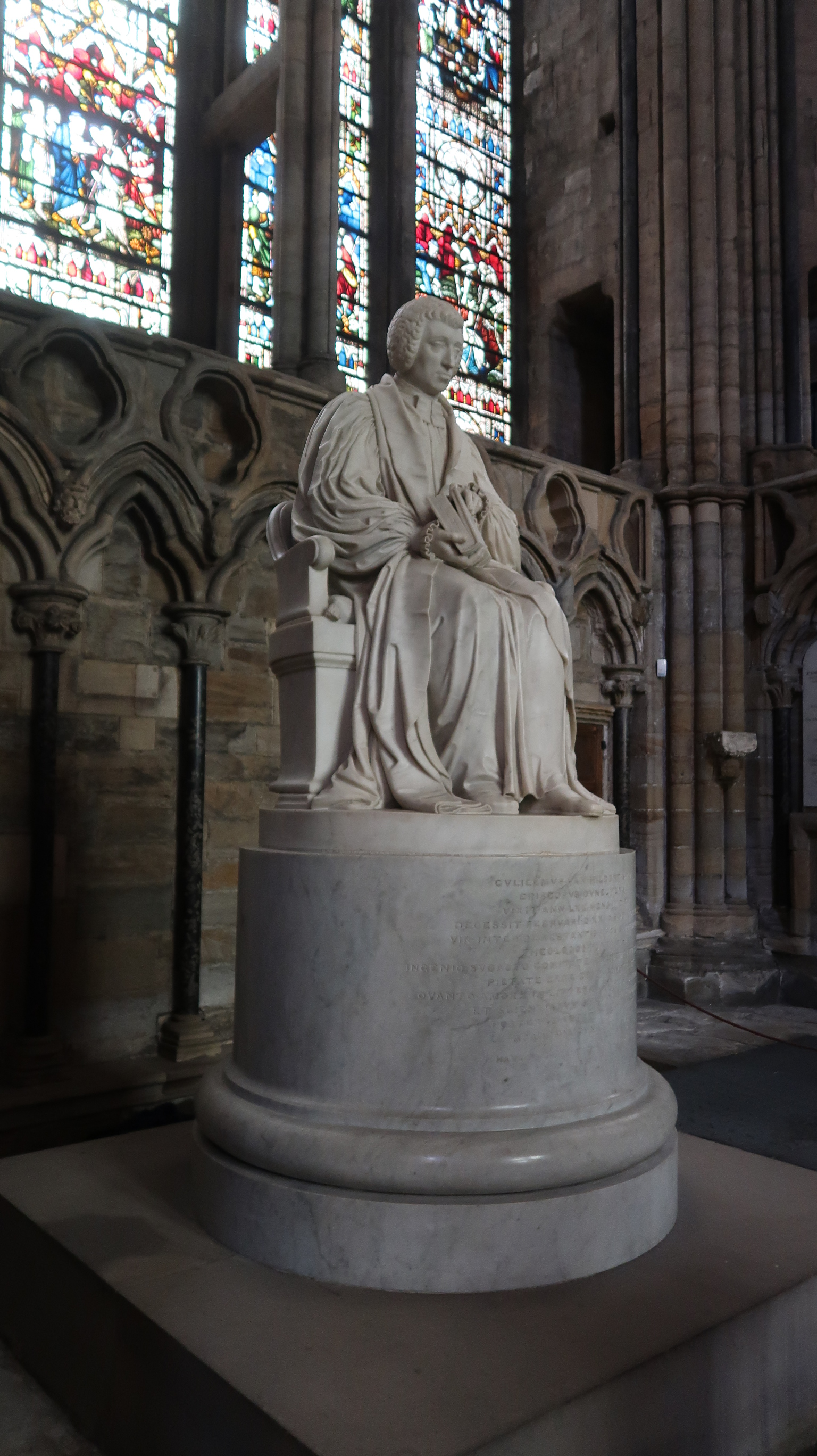
William van Mildert - the last of the Prince Bishops

In truth, most of the secular power of the bishop of Durham had already been removed by that time. The Great Reform Act 1832 saw the removal of most of the bishop's powers — although he maintained a seat in the House of Lords — and the Municipal Corporations Act 1835 had given the governing power of the town of Durham to an elected body.

== Works ==
- An Inquiry Into the General Principles of Scripture Interpretation
- One plain Argument to prove that Christianity could not be of human invention. Extracted from the “Boyle's Lectures” of the Bishop of Durham, 1831
- Sermons Preached before The Society of Lincoln Inn, 1832 (two volumes)

Academic offices
Preceded by William Howley	Regius Professor of Divinity at Oxford; 1813–1820	Succeeded by Frodsham Hodson
Church of England titles
Preceded by Herbert Marsh	Bishop of Llandaff; 1819–1826	Succeeded by Charles Sumner
Preceded by George Pretyman Tomline	Dean of St Paul's; 1820–1826	Succeeded by Charles Sumner
Preceded by Shute Barrington	Bishop of Durham; 1826–1836	Succeeded by Edward Maltby
