= William Edward Powell =

Welsh Lord Lieutenant and Conservative politician

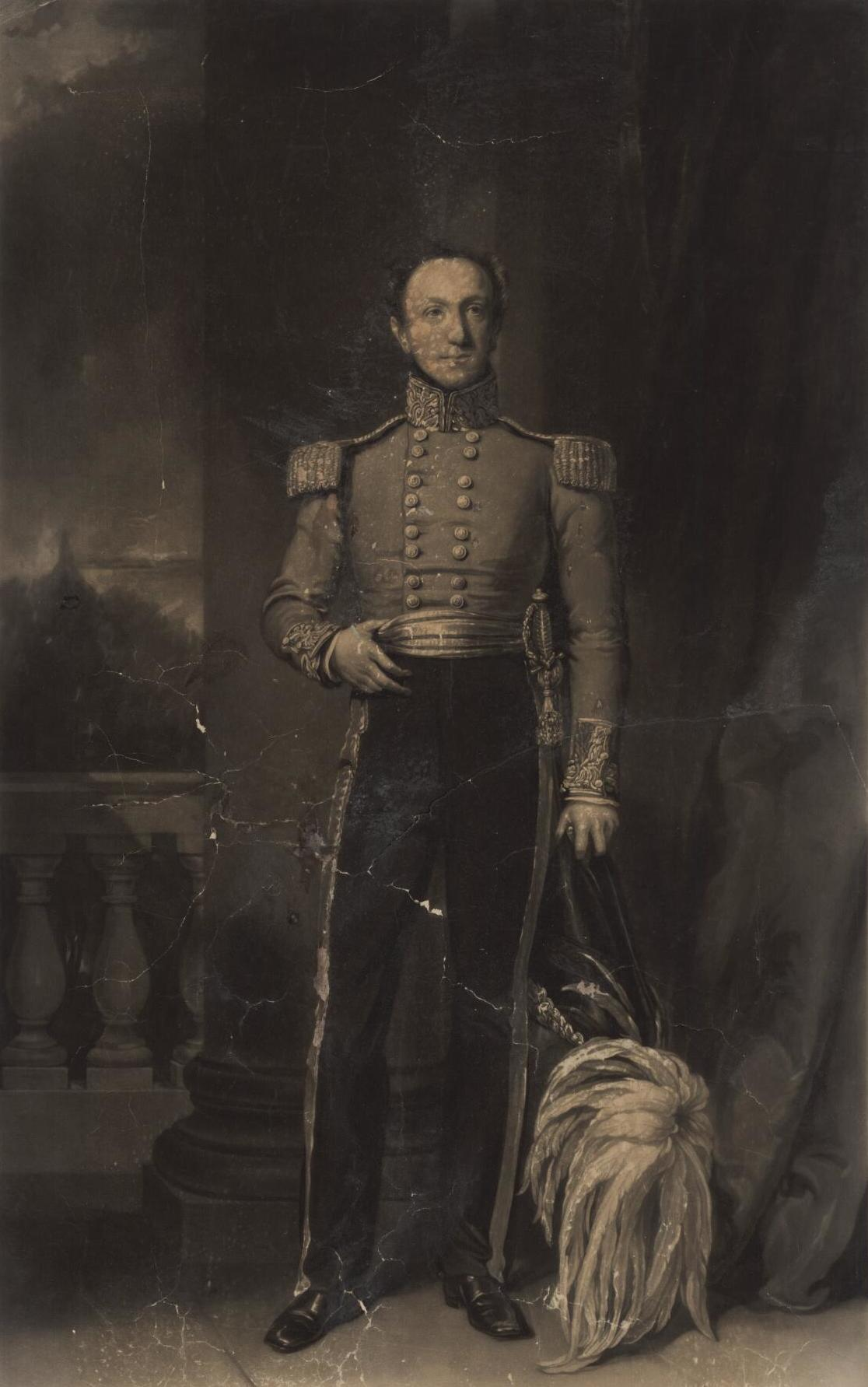
Portrait of William Edward Powell

William Edward Powell (16 February 1788 – 10 April 1854) was a Welsh Lord Lieutenant and Conservative Party politician who served as the Member of Parliament (MP) for Cardiganshire from 1816 until shortly before his death in 1854.

== Life ==
He was the eldest son of Thomas Powell of Nanteos and Elinor Corbet, daughter of Edward Maurice Corbet of Ynysymaengwyn, Merionethshire. He was educated at Westminster School, and matriculated at Christ Church, Oxford in 1804.

Brought up in France by his widowed mother, Powell finally occupied his father's estate at Nanteos, near Aberystwyth at the age of 21 in 1809. He was made High Sheriff of Cardiganshire in 1810. He became the Lord Lieutenant of Cardiganshire in 1817.

Despite earning a reputation for living beyond his means and evidence of neglect on his substantial Cardiganshire estates, he was returned to Parliament in 1816 as a Conservative upon the death of Thomas Johnes. There was some support at the time for Herbert Evans of Highmead as an alternative candidate but Powell secured the candidacy soon after issuing an address to the electors. He was destined to sit for eleven successive parliaments without a single competitor. However, there were occasional challenges to his tenure. As early as 1820, friends of Pryse Pryse, the member for Cardigan Boroughs were said to be seeking to secure him the county seat at the expense of Powell. However, this opposition dis not materialise when Powell returned to the county for the nomination, having not undertaken any personal canvassing in advance.

Powell made no recorded speeches in the Commons between 1820 and 1832.

As Lord Lieutenant of Cardiganshire and MP for the county, Powell considered it necessary to entertain on a lavish scale both at Nanteos and at his London residence. He was regularly reprimanded by his legal advisors of the precarious financial position of the estate. Despite this, he embarked in 1845 upon a substantial renovation at Nanteos, with a new wing and portico being added, designed by Edward Heycock of Shrewsbury. These renovations cost nearly £3,000 when completed in 1847.

In February 1854, Powell announced his retirement from the House of Commons.

Powell died at his London home on 10 April 1854. On Monday, 17 April, his remains returned to Nanteos, and were subsequently interred in the family vault at Llanbadarn Fawr. In the town of Aberystwyth, a mile from his burial place, all the shops and business were closed for the day. The estate was left to his eldest son.

== Family ==
Powell married Laura-Edwyna Phelp, eldest daughter of James Sacksville Tufton Phelp, of Coston House Leics in 1810, and had two sons:

- William Thomas Rowland Powell (4 August 1815 – 13 May 1878), who served as MP for Cardiganshire from 1859 until 1865.
- Cornelius Powell

Laura died in 1822. He married again in 1841 to Harriet Dell, widow of George Ackers of Moreton Hall, Cheshire.

== Sources ==
- Gorman, D. (1995). "William Powell of Nanteos and Public Affairs in Early Nineteenth Century Cardiganshire" (PDF). National Library of Wales Journal. 29 (1): 119–25.

Parliament of the United Kingdom
Preceded by Thomas Johnes	Member of Parliament for Cardiganshire; 1816–1854	Succeeded by The Earl of Lisburne
Honorary titles
Preceded by Thomas Johnes	Lord Lieutenant of Cardiganshire; 1817–1854	Succeeded by Thomas Lloyd
