= John Crichton-Stuart, 2nd Marquess of Bute =

British noble (1793–1848)

The Most Honourable The Marquess of Bute KT FRS
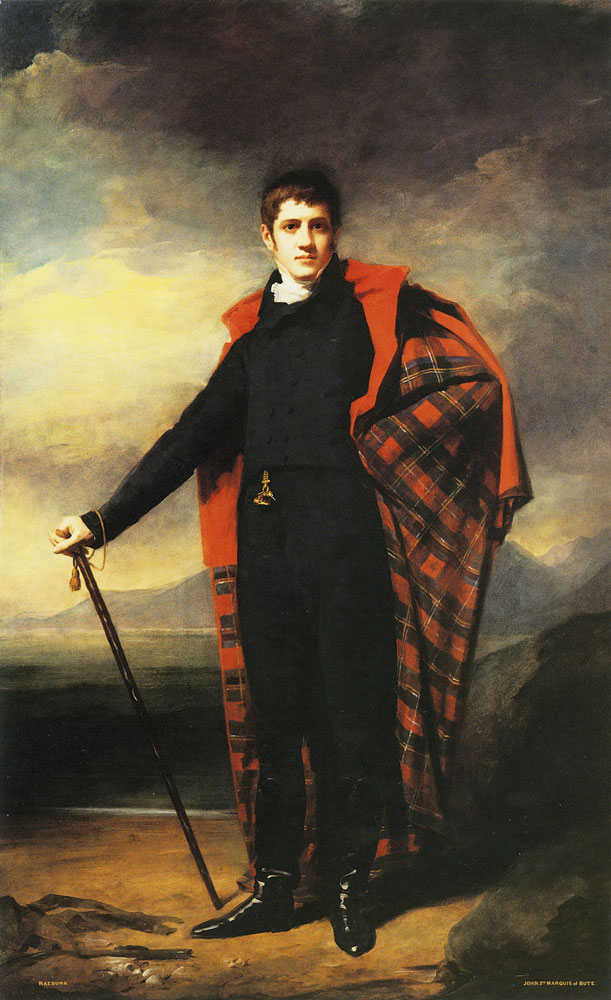
- Portrait by Henry Raeburn, c. 1829
- Predecessor: John Stuart, Lord Mount Stuart
- Successor: John Patrick Crichton-Stuart, 3rd Marquess of Bute
- Known for: Construction of Cardiff Docks
- Born: 10 August 1793
- Died: 18 March 1848 (aged 54)
- Buried: Kirtling
- Residence: Mount Stuart House
- Spouses: Lady Maria North; Lady Sophia Rawdon-Hastings
- Issue: John Patrick Crichton-Stuart, 3rd Marquess of Bute
- Parents: John Stuart, Lord Mount Stuart and Lady Elizabeth McDouall-Crichton

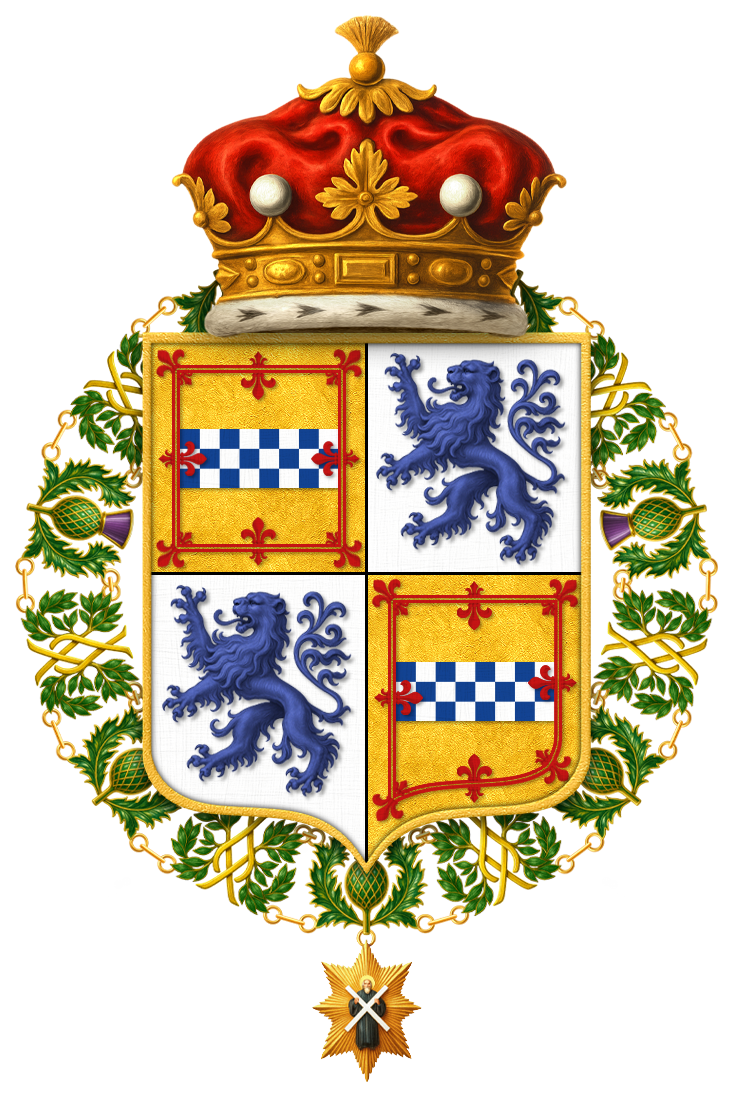
Shield of arms of John Crichton-Stuart, 2nd Marquess of Bute, KT, FRS

John Crichton-Stuart, 2nd Marquess of Bute, KT, FRS (10 August 1793 – 18 March 1848), styled Lord Mount Stuart between 1794 and 1814, was a wealthy Scottish aristocrat and industrialist in Georgian and early Victorian Britain. He developed the coal and iron industries across South Wales and built the Cardiff Docks.

Bute's father, John, Lord Mount Stuart, died a few months after he was born and as a young child he was brought up first by his mother, the former Lady Elizabeth McDouall-Crichton, and later by his paternal grandfather, John Stuart, 1st Marquess of Bute. He travelled widely across Europe before attending Cambridge University. He contracted an eye condition and remained partially sighted for the rest of his life.

Having inherited large estates across Britain, he married his first wife, Lady Maria North, in 1818, and together they lived a relatively secluded life in Mount Stuart House in Scotland, one of Bute's four seats. Bute was dour but industrious, with a flair for land management. He focused his daily routine around extensive correspondence with his estate managers, making biennial tours of his lands around the country. The couple did not conceive any children, and Maria died in 1841. Bute remarried four years later, to Lady Sophia Rawdon-Hastings, and she gave birth to Bute's only child, John, in 1847.

Bute was a member of the House of Lords and controlled the votes of several members of the House of Commons. He was a political and religious conservative, a follower of the Duke of Wellington, but rarely took part in national debates unless his own commercial interests were involved. Early on, Bute realised the vast wealth that lay in the South Wales coalfields and set about commercially exploiting them through local ironmasters and colliers.

He constructed the Cardiff Docks, a major project which, despite running heavily over budget, enabled further exports of iron and coal and magnified the value of his lands in Glamorganshire. When violence broke out in the Merthyr Rising of 1831, Bute led the government response from Cardiff Castle, despatching military forces, deploying spies and keeping Whitehall informed throughout. The contemporary press praised the marquess as "the creator of modern Cardiff", and on his death he left vast wealth to his son.

== Background and personal life ==
Bute was the son of John, Lord Mount Stuart, and the former Lady Elizabeth McDouall-Crichton. His parents were both from wealthy, aristocratic backgrounds; his father was due to become the Marquess of Bute, with extensive landholdings in Scotland and in South Wales, and his mother was the sole heir to the Crichton estates, with over 63,980 acres (25,890 ha) of land in Scotland. Bute's father died in a riding accident in February 1794, leaving Elizabeth to give birth to Bute's younger brother, Patrick Stuart, later that year.

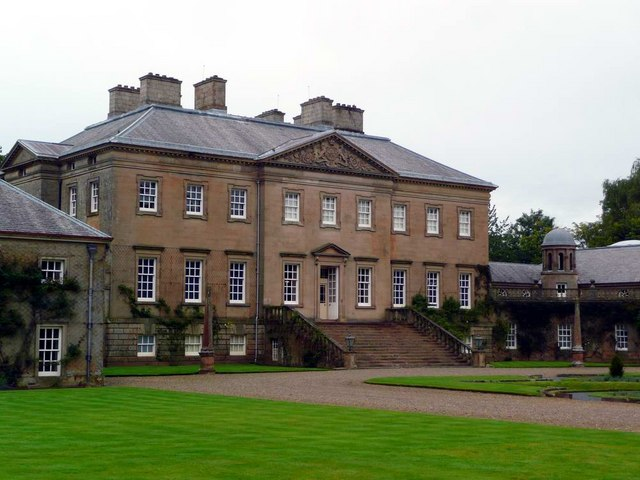
Dumfries House, Bute's first home

Initially Bute was brought up at Dumfries House by his mother and grandmother, but following their deaths he passed into the care of his grandfather, the 1st Marquess of Bute, and travelled with him across England and Europe. His family considered him to be clever and he went to study at Christ's College in Cambridge in 1809. Over the next few years he visited the Mediterranean, Scandinavia and Russia, taking a keen interest in land economics. He developed an eye condition during this period and became partially blind, leaving him unable to travel without assistance or to tolerate bright lights, and finding it difficult to read or write.

His maternal grandfather, Lord Dumfries, died in 1803, followed by his paternal grandfather in 1814, with Bute inheriting both sets of estates and adding Crichton to his surname after Lord Dumfries. As a consequence he held many hereditary titles and posts: in addition to being the Marquess of Bute, he was also the Earl of Windsor, Viscount Mountjoy, Baron Mount Stuart, Baron Cardiff, the Earl of Dumfries and Bute, the Viscount of Ayr and Kingarth, Baron Crichton, Lord Crichton of Sanquhar and Cumnock, and Lord Mount Stuart Cumra and Inchmarnock, and a Baronet of Nova Scotia. He was the Keeper of Rothsay Castle, the Lord Lieutenant and Custos Rotulorum of Glamorgan, the Lord Lieutenant, the hereditary Sheriff and Coroner of Buteshire, and the High Steward of Banbury.

Bute had four major seats, Mount Stuart House on the Isle of Bute, Dumfries House in Ayrshire, Luton Hoo in Bedfordshire, and Cardiff Castle in South Wales, with his London townhouse, Bute House, on Campden Hill in Kensington. Bute preferred to live in Mount Stuart House; he disliked London and only spent a few weeks in Cardiff Castle each year. Twice each year he would travel from Mount Stuart House through Ayrshire to Edinburgh, down through northern England to London, and on to Cardiff and his South Wales estates.

Concerned about his growing blindness, and not enjoying the social life in London, Bute retired to his estates on the Isle of Bute for the next six years. While recovering, Bute married his first wife, Lady Maria North, in 1818. Maria was one of the three daughters of the 3rd Earl of Guilford, and a wealthy heiress. £40,000 was settled on her at the time of her marriage and she was due to inherit a third of her father's extensive estates. (Note: Measuring comparative 19th and 21st-century incomes, wealth and project costs is not straightforward. Calculations based around the Retail Price Index are not suitable for assessing these categories. This article uses the income index of per-capita GDP to assess comparative income and wealth, and a share of GDP index for project costs. £40,000 in 1818 was the equivalent of around £39 million in 2011.) Contemporaries considered Maria a kind and pleasant woman, but she was often unwell and the marriage proved childless. In 1820 his portrait was painted by Henry Raeburn, and published two years later as an engraving by William Ward. In 1827 his father-in-law died and Maria inherited lands worth over £110,000. (Note: £110,000 in 1827 was the equivalent of around £125 million in 2011.)

The historian John Davies describes Bute as "dour, remote and overbearing on first acquaintance" but with a "sense of responsibility, considerable imagination and an enormous capacity for hard work". By the aristocratic standards of the day, Bute lived a reclusive lifestyle. As a result of his personality and poor eyesight, he did not enjoy hunting, shooting, or large social gatherings, nor did he like racehorses or gambling. His first wife's illnesses added to this sense of exclusion from wider aristocratic society. Compared to other landowners of the period, Bute was relatively philanthropic, giving away around seven to eight percent of his rental income from South Wales in charitable donations, for example. He was keen to fund local schools and to construct new churches, partially because in doing so he was able to discourage any moves towards Nonconformism and the disestablishment of the official Church.

In 1841 Lady Maria died, and Bute blamed his excessive focus on the dock programme for exacerbating his wife's illness. As a result of the original marriage agreement, Bute continued to draw the incomes from his late wife's property for the remainder of his life, even though officially the estates would ultimately pass to Maria's sister, Lady Susan, on his own death. In November 1843, a fire swept through Luton Hoo House, destroying the interior; the house's historic library survived, however, and most of its famous collection of paintings were rescued from the blaze; it was subsequently sold off by Bute. From 1843, the London house was let out: first to the Lascelles family until 1856, then to the Duke of Rutland until 1888. Bute House was later acquired by Charles Weld-Blundell, who renamed it Blundell House: it was demolished 1912–1913.

Bute was created a Knight of the Thistle in 1843 by Queen Victoria. In 1845 Bute fell from his horse and injured his eyes further in the accident, making it still harder for him to read and write. Bute remarried the same year, this time to Lady Sophia Rawdon-Hastings, the daughter of the Marquess of Hastings. Sophia was obsessive, hard to please and did not get on well with John's family, especially his brother. She soon became pregnant, but gave birth to a stillborn child; the couple's second child, whom they named John, was successfully born in 1847.

Bute's relationship with his brother Patrick was often difficult. Their political views did not coincide, as Patrick was much more liberal than Bute and favoured political reform. Although Bute arranged for Patrick to become a Member of Parliament in 1818, in 1831 their differing views resulted in Bute removing him from Parliament. For many years, Patrick had good reason to expect that Bute would die childless, leaving him to inherit the family estates; after Bute's death, he disputed the occupancy of Cardiff Castle with Lady Sophia.

== Landowner and industrialist ==
=== Estate management ===
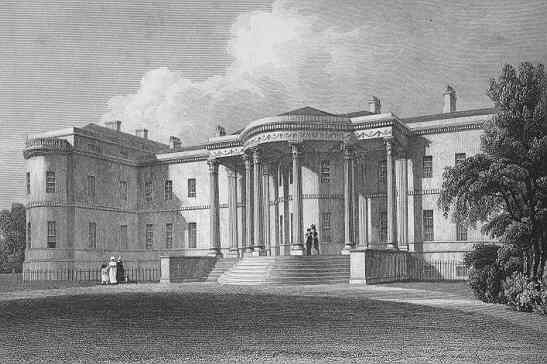
Luton Hoo, Bute's residence in Bedfordshire, before the fire

Bute was determined to develop his different estates and receive the best possible return from them. He was an active, ambitious manager, quick to generate new ideas for the properties, and spent the majority of his time managing his properties . Despite his poor eyesight, he wrote at least six letters to his managers each day. He had a detailed understanding of his various estates and businesses; he attempted to keep up with affairs in Glamorgan, for example, by reading the local Welsh newspapers from his house in Scotland and through exchanging letters with influential local figures. Bute recognised that his land holdings were too extended and disparate to be easily managed and attempted to rationalise them. He attempted to sell his Luton estates in the early 1820s but failed to obtain an adequate price; he successfully sold them in the early 1840s. Luton and Luton Hoo was finally sold in 1845, by then comprising around 3,600 acres (1,500 ha).

Unusually for an aristocrat of the period, Bute owned almost all of his lands fully, as an owner in fee simple, rather than having his rights diluted through arrangements with trustees. When he married in 1818, Bute placed his English and Wales estates into a trustee arrangement for any future children, but this agreement expired with Lady Maria's death in 1842; when he remarried in 1845 a similar trustee agreement was set up, although in this version the Glamorgan estates were administered separately from his other holdings in England and Wales. Bute continued to run his network of estates and estate managers personally, helped by Onesipherus Bruce, a barrister-agent and close friend.

As early as 1815, Bute had his Glamorgan estates fully surveyed, which highlighted that the estates had been neglected for many years and were now in a poor condition. Edward Richards became the senior official in charge of the estates by 1824 and represented Bute on both estate and political affairs across the region. Despite this, Bute retained the final authority over even quite minor issues on the estates, including making decisions on the buttons to be used on local school uniforms or the reuse of a broken flag pole, for example, which could result in considerable delays as letters were sent between South Wales and Scotland. As the complexity of the Glamorgan estates grew, more officials were appointed to help manage the docks, farms and mineral interests, but these all reported separately to Bute, putting increasing pressure on the marquess.

On the Isle of Bute, the marquess expanded his properties, purchasing land in Ascog, Kilmahalmag and Etterick Mill.

=== Glamorganshire ===
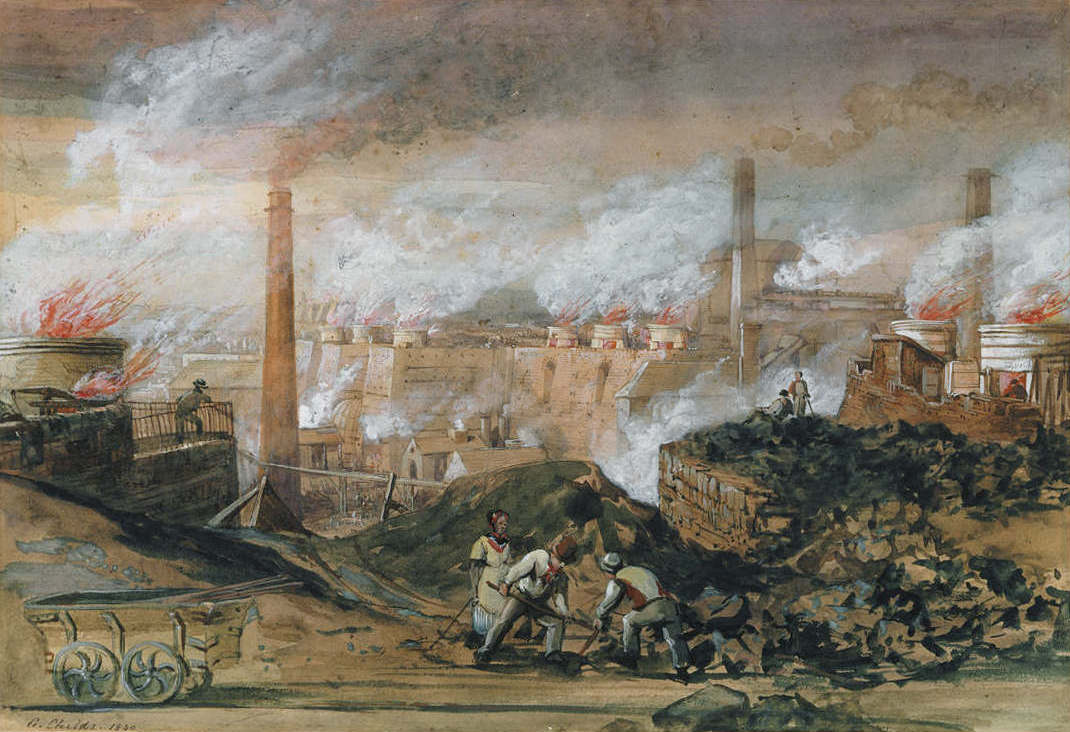
Dowlais Ironworks, one of the various enterprises with which Bute was involved

Bute was closely involved in the developments across Glamorganshire during the first half of the 19th century. The region saw tremendous economic and social changes in a short period. The population almost trebled in the first forty years of the century and industrial outputs soared, with the output of pig iron increasing from 34,000 to 277,000 tons between 1796 and 1830. Industry and mining replaced agriculture as the main sources of work. In driving forward and responding to these changes, Bute transformed his South Wales estate into a major industrial enterprise.

Bute's land holdings in Glamorgan were spread out across the county and he took steps to consolidate them, selling around 1,800 acres (730 ha) of some of the outlying properties in the west and investing heavily in buying 4,600 acres (1,900 ha) of land around Cardiff between 1814 and 1826. The rising prices of land and the costs of the docks brought an end to this expansion. Estimating the profitability of the Glamorgan estates is challenging because of the way that the accounts were drawn up during the period, but estimates suggest that once land purchases and the dock building cost were factored in, the estates cost the marquess much more than they delivered in income. Bute borrowed heavily; he had inherited debts of £62,500, but by the time of his death owed £493,887. (Note: £62,500 in 1814 was the equivalent of around £58 million in 2011; £493,887 in 1848 was the equivalent of around £534 million in 2011.) Financing and supporting this debt was difficult, particularly during the early 1840s, when credit was hard to come by, and John was forced to juggle lenders and different lines of credit. He believed that ultimately his investments would provide a rich return, and in 1844 noted that he thought "well of the prospects of my income in the distance".

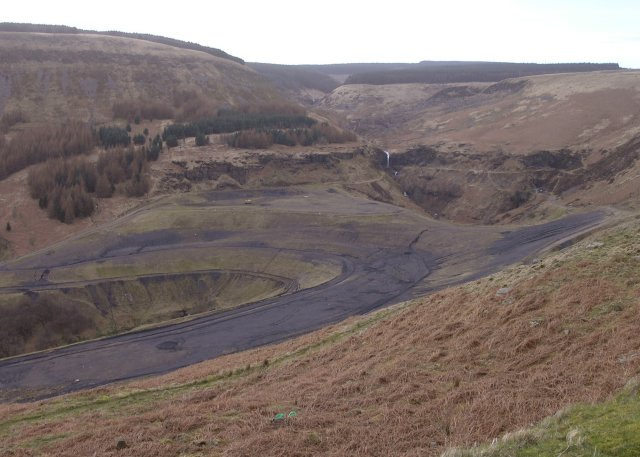
Remains of the Rhigos colliery, once owned by Bute

The economic growth across South Wales drove up the demand for new housing for the growing workforce. Bute was not prepared to sell any of his lands for housing, and did not see much profit in building and renting housing himself, but was prepared to lease land in the growing urban areas and mining communities for land development. Initially, he attempted to negotiate 63-year long leases, which would have given his successors additional, early flexibility in how they managed the land, but these proved unpopular so he reverted to offering the more typical 99-year leases. None of the contracts offered by Bute allowed the lessee to buy the freehold or automatically renew the lease at the end of this term, which ultimately resulted in substantial political difficulties for the third and fourth marquesses when there was a storm of complaints in the late 19th and early 20th century. Bute left the style of the early developments up to the lessees, but was concerned by the poor results. Bute then began to approve the designs for new buildings personally, laying out some grand streets in the centre of Cardiff and retaining open areas for eventual use as parks. Very little money was invested in the sewage and drainage systems for his new developments, however, and a damning 1850 inquiry showed that this had resulted in cholera outbreaks across the town.

At the start of the 19th century, scientific investigation began to indicate that the Glamorgan valleys were rich with coal deposits. Bute, who already owned coal mines in County Durham, commissioned further surveys in 1817 and 1823–24 which showed that there were potentially huge profits to be made from the reserves, both from the coal sitting beneath Bute's own lands, but also from the coal under common lands in the region that Bute could claim through his feudal titles. Bute set about consolidating his rights and existing investments during the late 1820s and 1830s, acquiring extensive rights to the coalfields in the process. Bute established and managed a few colleries – such as that at Rhigos – directly, but given the investment costs and attention they took up, generally preferred to lease out his coal fields and claim a royalty on the coal mined instead. The lessees might be iron-masters, who used the coal in their own operations, or colliery owners who sold the coal on to industrial or domestic customers. The profits increased from £872 in the second half of 1826, to £10,756 in 1848–49. (Note: £872 in 1826 was the equivalent of around £1 million in 2011; £10,756 in 1848 was the equivalent of around £12 million in 2011.)

=== Cardiff Docks ===
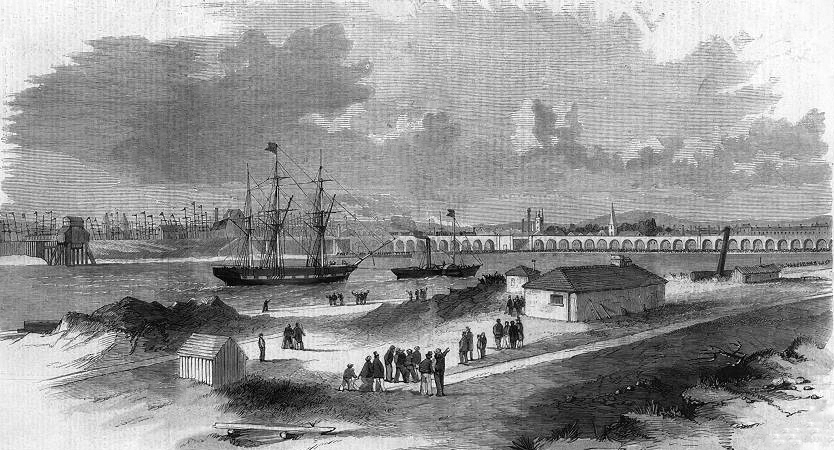
Part of the Cardiff Docks in 1859

Between 1822 and 1848 Bute played a central role in the creation of the Cardiff Docks. The idea was first put forward to Bute by one of his staff in 1822, who suggested that, with the right investment, Cardiff could be transformed into a major port for exporting coal and iron. The existing seaport, used by the Glamorganshire Canal, was small and inefficient. The new port would then deliver a direct return to Bute from shipping rates, improve the value of his lands in Cardiff itself and increase the value of the royalties he could charge on his coal fields. Initially Bute opposed plans for docks put forward by the local ironmasters, but then changed his mind and pushed forward with his own scheme shortly afterward.

The first phase was to build a new dock and connecting canal in Cardiff, making the Glamorganshire Canal redundant in the process, at an estimated cost of £66,600, considered to opponents to be a "wild speculation". Parliamentary permission was acquired in 1830, despite opposition from the local canal companies of iron masters. The project proved more complex than originally planned, driving Bute to become irritable and angry with almost all of his associates, but the dock opened successfully in 1839. The costs of building the docks had been far more than anticipated, however. Instead of the original estimate, construction costs had soared to £350,000, reaching £10,000 a month in 1837. (Note: £66,000 and £350,000 in 1839 were the equivalent of around £171 million and £907 million in 2011 respectively.) Bute had to mortgage his local estates to raise the sums required to finish the project. To make matters worse, when they first opened the docks did not receive the traffic he had expected, particularly from the larger ships; Bute put this down to a coalition of ironmasters and others intent on ruining him.

Bute responded by putting commercial pressure on shipping companies to abandon the Glamorganshire Canal and using his feudal rights to force shippers to move their wharfs to his docks. His efforts paid off and although trade through the docks only came to 8,000 tons in 1839, they then rose quickly, reaching 827,000 tons by 1849. Between 1841 and 1848 the docks brought in a gross income of just under £68,000, a relatively disappointing figure compared to the size of the investment. (Note: £68,000 in 1848 was the equivalent of around £73 million in 2011.) Successive marquesses would find themselves under huge pressure to continue investing and expanding in the docks and subsequent phases of construction over the coming decades.

== Politics ==
=== National ===
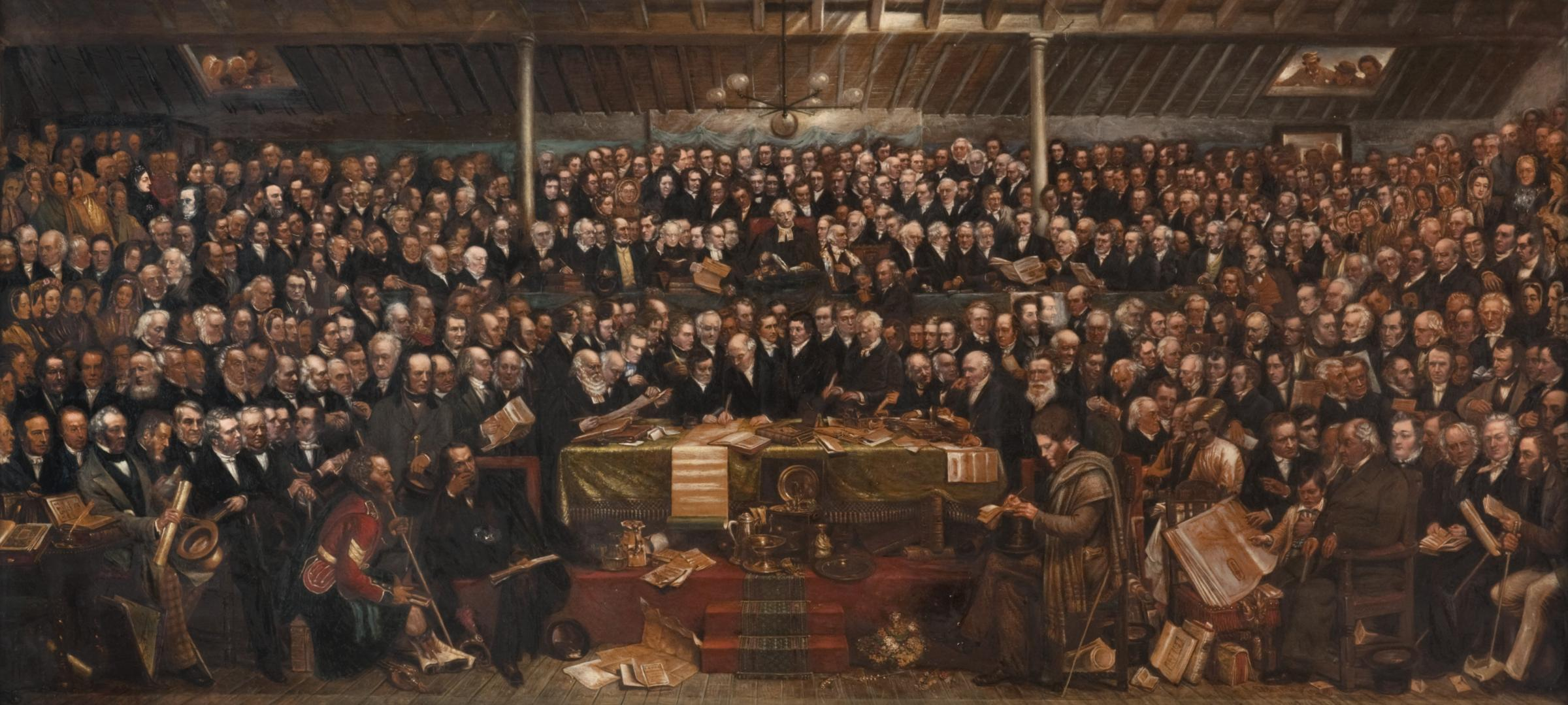
Bute was Her Majesty's High Commissioner during "the Disruption".

Bute was born into the pre-Reform system of government in Britain. The British Parliament was divided into the hereditary House of Lords and the elected House of Commons, but voting systems varied widely across England and in many cases only very small numbers of local people were enfranchised to vote. Some members of the House of Lords, termed "patrons", often controlled these "closed" or "nominated" seats in the Commons, effectively appointing their own candidates. Criticism of the system, led by the Whigs, grew during the first half of Bute's life.

Bute was a member of the House of Lords, able to vote on national affairs, but he had a reputation for not attending unless to vote on acts relating to his estates or business interests. When he did vote, it was usually as a moderate conservative, and Bute himself described himself as a follower of the Duke of Wellington, by then a leading Tory politician. John was in favour of Catholic Emancipation, opposed to slavery, the New Poor Law and the Game Laws. Like Wellington, he was in favour of repealing the Corn Laws. He passionately opposed electoral reform, however, and any attempts to disestablish the Church of England or Scotland. Bute had strong views on the necessity of encouraging the poor to work, and was in favour of removing the Irish poor from the mainland back to Ireland. He was a notoriously poor public speaker.

In addition to his personal role in Parliament, Bute sought to control the votes of members of the House of Commons, primarily to ensure the passage of legislation affecting his business interests. Initially, the Isle of Bute had only 21 voters who were dominated by his private estate, but it only returned a Member of Parliament in alternate elections, and his estates in Luton were too limited to allow him to influence the electoral process there. The best remaining option for Bute was to control the voting in Cardiff, but even here he had to choose his candidate carefully and apply careful financial pressure through his control of leases and rents to ensure their election.

In 1832 the Reform Act was passed by Parliament, widening the electorate across the country. The Isle of Bute's electorate rose to 300 and acquired a permanent Member of Parliament, still controlled by Bute. Cardiff saw a short-term drop in its electorate as a result of the act, and Bute benefited from the granting of the vote to many of his richer agricultural tenants. In the aftermath of the reforms, Bute secretly sponsored the creation of the conservative newspaper the Glamorgan Monmouth and Brecon Gazette and Merthyr Guardian, to increase support across the county, and underwrote its losses for many years.

From 1842 to 1846 he acted as Her Majesty's High Commissioner to the General Assembly of the Church of Scotland. He was known for his generosity as a host in this role. He was in office during the schism in the Church of Scotland known as "the Disruption", when many many ministers of the Church broke away from the established Church to form the Free Church. Bute took a firm line on the matter: when his head-gardener at Mount Stuart House joined the Free Church, he was immediately sacked, and when the minister at one of Bute's churches in the north of the island attempted to hold a Free Church ceremony there, Bute demanded the keys to the church be returned and had the property closed up.

=== South Wales ===
==== Re-establishing authority ====
Bute was determined to control the local government around Cardiff, considering it part of his rights and duties as a major landowner and aristocrat. On inheriting his estates, however, he found himself facing a difficult political situation. The Butes' grip on Glamorganshire had been weakened in the late 18th century, and the management of their political interests had been left for many years in the hands of John Wood, a local solicitor, whose family was embroiled in local politics, with their own set of interests. Glamorgan was also politically split between factions in the west and the east of the county, with most of Bute's estates in the eastern half. Bute's residence in the area, Cardiff Castle, was understaffed and regarded as unsuitable as a residence; consequently, he lacked the easy local patronage that would have come with a major, properly functioning establishment.

There were tensions between Bute and the new industrialists around the region, including ironmasters such as John Guest, the master of the Dowlais Ironworks. Bute was a financial competitor or landlord with many of these men, and keen to drive as good a deal as possible in his negotiations with them. He also had political differences, seeing himself as a benevolent feudal lord in South Wales, and perceiving the local iron-masters as arrogant, power-hungry individuals, abusing their economic power towards communities and workers.

Nonetheless, Bute was able to personally appoint the Constable of Cardiff Castle, and the constable by law acted as the effective mayor of Cardiff, ran the town's council and had wide powers when appointing local officials. He inherited the title of Lord-Lieutenant of the county in 1815, giving him the right to recommend the appointments of new magistrates and various other civic posts; potential candidates for these posts were advised to vote for Bute's representatives at elections. In 1825 he became the Colonel of the Royal Glamorgan Light Infantry Militia, and used this authority to instruct the militia to vote for his candidates. Those who publicly voted against Bute faced charitable donations and support being cut off. His later control of the Cardiff Docks also helped to provide patronage and influence voting behaviour.

In 1817, John Wood died in the midst of a financial scandal, and Bute decided to appoint two of his rivals to the posts of Constable and Cardiff's Town Clerk. This would have reaffirmed Bute's power to change the appointments and broken the Wood's family hold on local power, but it provoked a storm of local political wrangling. The Wood family turned on Bute, arguing that he should abandon his claims to control local Welsh affairs from Scotland. Bute replied by trying to crush the Wood family's bank and stacking the town council with his appointees in early 1818. The Woods successfully took legal action, challenging Bute's authority to take these actions, and anti-Bute violence flared that summer, resulting in arrests by Special Constables appointed by Bute. The pro-Bute faction in Cardiff rallied and the Woods were defeated at the Parliamentary elections that year, the results reaffirming Bute's authority over the town council.

==== Merthyr Rising ====
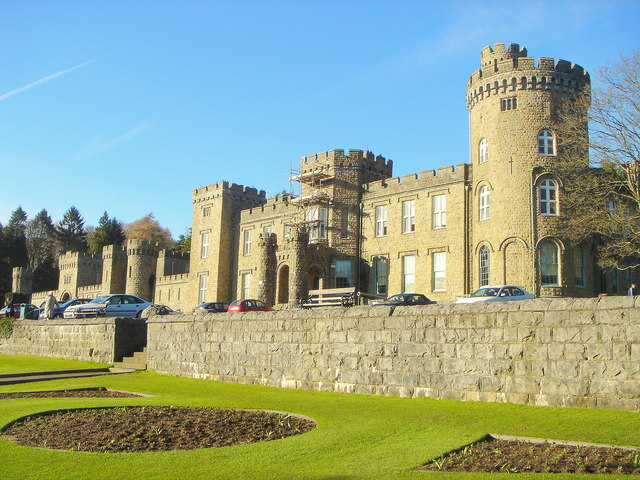
Cyfarthfa Castle, scene of part of the Merthyr Rising in 1831

Bute played a role in the event of the Merthyr Rising, a large, armed industrial protest that occurred in Merthyr Tydfil in South Wales in 1831. Political tensions amongst the working classes in Glamorgan had grown during the 1820s: although wages were impressive by contemporary standards during good years, they deteriorated quickly during depressions, plunging many into destitution; sanitation and health standards in the fast-growing industrial communities were appalling, child mortality rates were extremely high. 1831 saw a severe economic depression, with wages falling quickly and food prices rising, and complaints against the local debt courts and their bailiffs were numerous. Nationally, the electoral reform movement was making considerable protests and protests against the Corn Laws—which kept the prices of food high—were growing. In South Wales, several of the major ironmasters were associated with these movements, promoting reform under the Whig administration voted into power between April and June 1831.

By late 1830, and certainly by the spring of 1831, trouble in South Wales looked likely and, probably in response, Bute broke from his normal annual plans and in May travelled south from Scotland to Cardiff Castle. With a reform bill looking likely, tensions grew between the different political factions in Glamorganshire and how the potential new parliamentary seats should be shared out, especially between Bute and his conservative allies, Crawshay and Guest. Radical demonstrations occurred in Merthyr Tydfil, one of the largest industrial communities, in May, and the crowd set light to effigies of conservative politicians. Violence broke out and arrests were made on 10 May; the prisoners were released by the angry crowd and the local authorities effectively lost any control of the town. A general insurrection ensued on 30 May.

Two local magistrates, J. Bruce and Anthony Hill, were stranded in the Castle Inn in Merthyr Tydfil. They swore in around 70 men as special constables, but they were heavily outnumbered by the radical crowds. Bruce wrote an urgent letter to Bute in Cardiff Castle, asking for urgent advice on whether to call in the armed forces, and querying whether the Marquess had readied the Militia for action. Huge crowds marched on the local iron works, stopping production. The messages from Merthyr Tydfil reached Bute that afternoon, who began to assemble the Eastern and Central Yeomanry, Militia and transport ready for deployment. Bute paused until the morning, hoping to hear better news, but messengers bought more desperate news from Bruce and Hill, and the Yeomanry were dispatched. Meanwhile, an 80-man unit of the 93rd Foot had arrived in the Castle Inn from Brecon. Bute continued to keep Whitehall informed of the events by letter throughout.

On the morning of 3 May, the 93rd Foot reached the Castle Inn, where the magistrates had been joined by the established figures of the town, deputised as constables, including the High Sheriff and most of the ironmasters. Outside, the radical crowds had grown to an estimated number of between 7,000 and 10,000. Tensions rose alarmingly and the Riot Act was read in English and Welsh. Violence flared, the crowds attempted to seize the soldiers' weapons and the soldiers responded with volleys of musket fire. The town's working classes exploded in anger and set about searching the region for weapons. A messenger escaped the inn to reach Bute in Cardiff, who set about mobilising all the remaining armed forces he had available. Bute also despatched Lieutenant-Colonel Richard Morgan of the Militia into Merthyr to replace the commander of the 93rd Foot who had been badly injured.

The men in the Castle Inn retreated to Penydarren House, who were joined by the initial reinforcements from the Yeomanry, bringing the establishment's numbers to around 300, not all of them were armed and able to fight. They faced increasingly well-armed insurgents and Bute became increasingly concerned about the quality of the opposition facing his men. Bute sent spies into the insurgency, and nearby Cyfarthfa Castle was pressed into service as an observation post. Bute mobilised military pensioners, and used them to start to bring Penydarren House additional weaponry from Cardiff; he was advised to be careful, however, in case the shipments fell into the hands of the insurgency. Morgan's forces were able to prevent the radical crowds from entering either Penydarren or Cyfartha, and Bute arrested potential insurgents in Cardiff.

On 16 May, Morgan was in a position to advance in force into Merthyr, pushing forward and taking advantage of the poor communications between the various elements of the insurgency. The uprising collapsed, and over the next few days the authorities regained control, making arrests and forcing the workers back to business. Government inquiries into the incident began and Bute, among others, provided analysis and reports to Whitehall. In the aftermath, Richard Lewis, one of the radical crowd, was hanged in Cardiff. The execution proved controversial and it is unknown whether Bute, who had by then left to attend Parliament in London, approved of the decision.

==== Later years ====
Concerns over possible violent outbreaks continued for many years. Chartism became prominent in the region in the late 1830s, again causing Bute considerable worries in 1839 and leading to him encouraging the mobilisation of military forces to deal with the threat. Bute began to advocate the creation of a police force to suppress the problems in the northern valleys, for once allying himself with the local ironmasters to overcome rural opposition to the scheme. In 1841 the scheme was passed by the Glamorgan magistrates, with a chief constable and headquarters established that year.

In 1835 an act of Parliament reformed the local government structure, introducing a new town corporation structure with an elected mayor for the first time. Bute had to work harder to maintain his influence over the new corporation, using the various levers of influence at his disposal. He was successful, and in practice the elected officials and councillors were controlled by Bute and his interests.

== Death ==
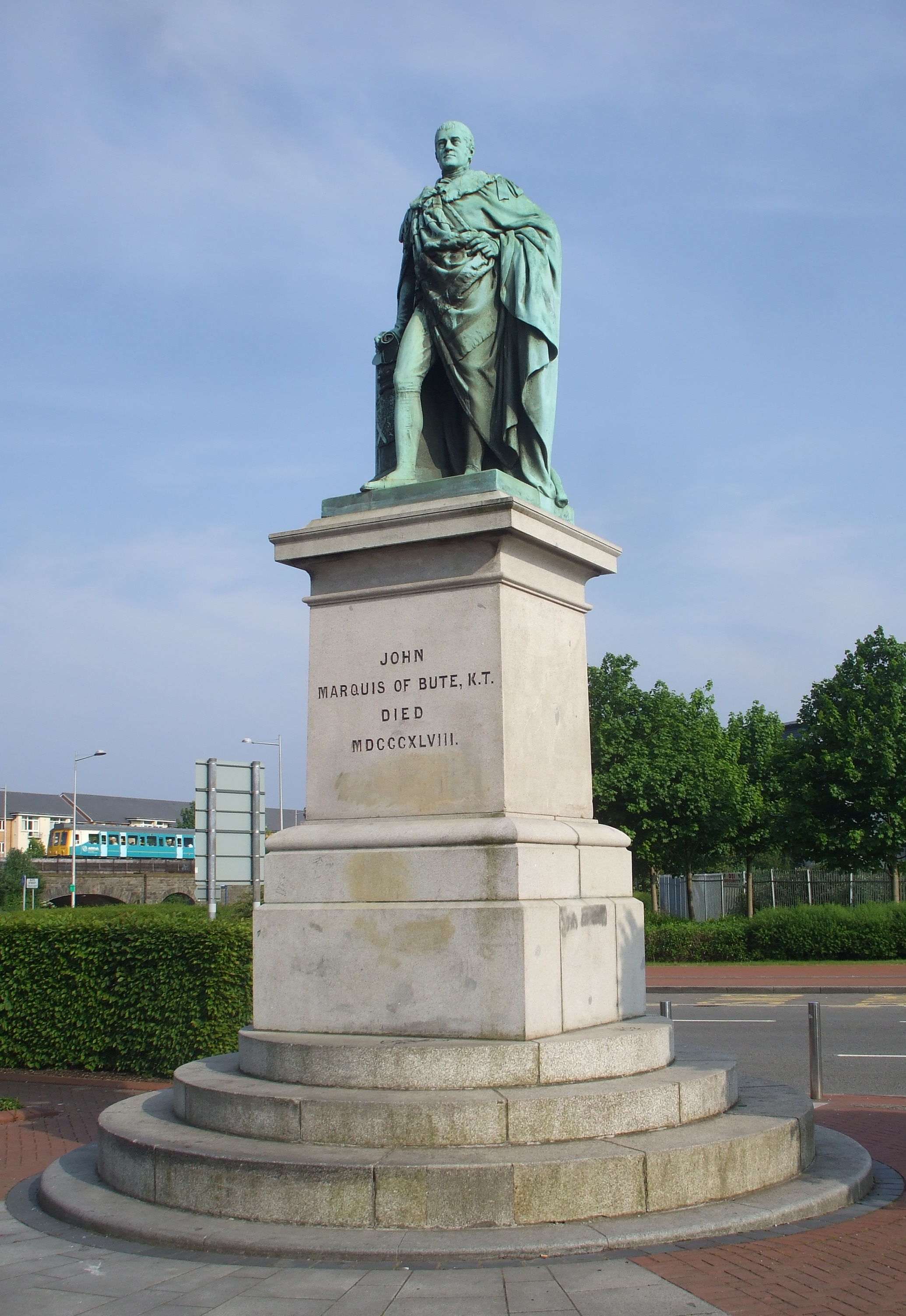
Bute's statue in Callaghan Square, Cardiff

Bute died in Cardiff on 18 March 1848, and was buried in Kirtling, alongside Maria, his first wife. His funeral had 31 carriages in attendance and drew large crowds, although his funeral was snubbed by the local ironmasters. The national press gave his death little coverage, but the local Daily Chronicle noted Bute's unusual achievement in building up the industrial base of his South Wales estates, and particularly praised his role in constructing the Cardiff Docks. The Cardiff Docks, whose opening in 1837 had led the press to praise Bute as "the creator of modern Cardiff", continued to transform the city over the rest of the century. They would also form a financial liability to Bute successors, the costs of the continual investment needed to maintain and grow the facilities partially off-setting the huge profits that Bute's son enjoyed from the South Wales coalfields.

A subscription was raised across Glamorgan to pay for a statue to be made of him, which was erected in Cardiff's High Street in 1853, outside the town hall. In 2000 the statue, Cardiff's oldest, was moved to Bute Square, but the location was renamed Callaghan Square in 2002, leading to proposals from local officials that Bute's statue might be better relocated once again, potentially to outside Cardiff Castle.

== Ancestry ==
Ancestors of John Crichton-Stuart, 2nd Marquess of Bute

16. Lord James Stuart, 2nd Earl of Bute
8. Lord John Stuart, 3rd Earl of Bute
17. Lady Anne Campbell
4. Lord John Stuart, 1st Marquess of Bute
18. Edward Wortley Montagu
9. Mary Wortley Montagu
19. Lady Mary Pierrepont
2. Lord John Stuart, Lord Mount Stuart
20. Lord Thomas Windsor, 1st Viscount Windsor
10. Lord Herbert Windsor, 2nd Viscount Windsor
21. Lady Charlotte Herbert
5. Hon. Charlotte Jane Windsor
22. Sir John Clavering, 3rd Baronet
11. Alice Clavering
23. Jane Mallabar
1. Lord John Crichton-Stuart, 2nd Marquess of Bute
24. Patrick MacDowall, Laird of Freugh
12. John McDouall of Freugh
25. Margaret Haltridge of Dromore
6. Lord Patrick McDouall-Crichton, 6th Earl of Dumfries
26. Hon. William Dalrymple
13. Elizabeth Crichton Dalrymple
27. Lady Penelope Crichton, 4th Countess of Dumfries
3. Lady Elizabeth Penelope McDouall-Crichton
28. Patrick Craufurd of Drumsoy
14. Ronald Crauford of Restalrig
29. Jane Craufurd of Auchinames
7. Margaret Crauford
30. John Forbes of Newhall
15. Catherine Forbes
31. Margaret Robertson of Bedley

Honorary titles
Preceded by The Marquess of Bute	Lord Lieutenant of Buteshire; 1815–1848	Succeeded by Lord Patrick Crichton-Stuart
Preceded by The Marquess of Bute	Lord Lieutenant of Glamorgan; 1815–1848	Succeeded by Christopher Rice Mansel Talbot
Peerage of Great Britain
Preceded by John Stuart	Marquess of Bute; 1814–1848	Succeeded by John Crichton-Stuart
Peerage of Scotland
Preceded by Patrick McDouall	Earl of Dumfries; 1803–1848	Succeeded by John Crichton-Stuart
