= Sir Watkin Williams-Wynn, 5th Baronet =

Welsh landowner and politician (1772–1840)

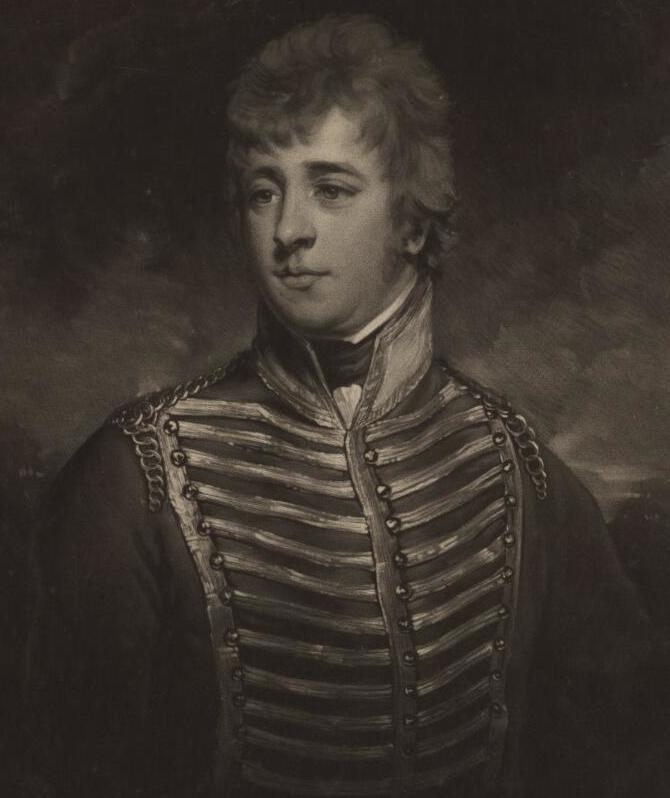
Sir Watkin Williams-Wynn, 5th Baronet

Colonel Sir Watkin Williams-Wynn, 5th Baronet (25 October 1772 – 6 January 1840) was a Welsh landowner and Tory politician who sat in the House of Commons from 1794 to 1840.

== Biography ==
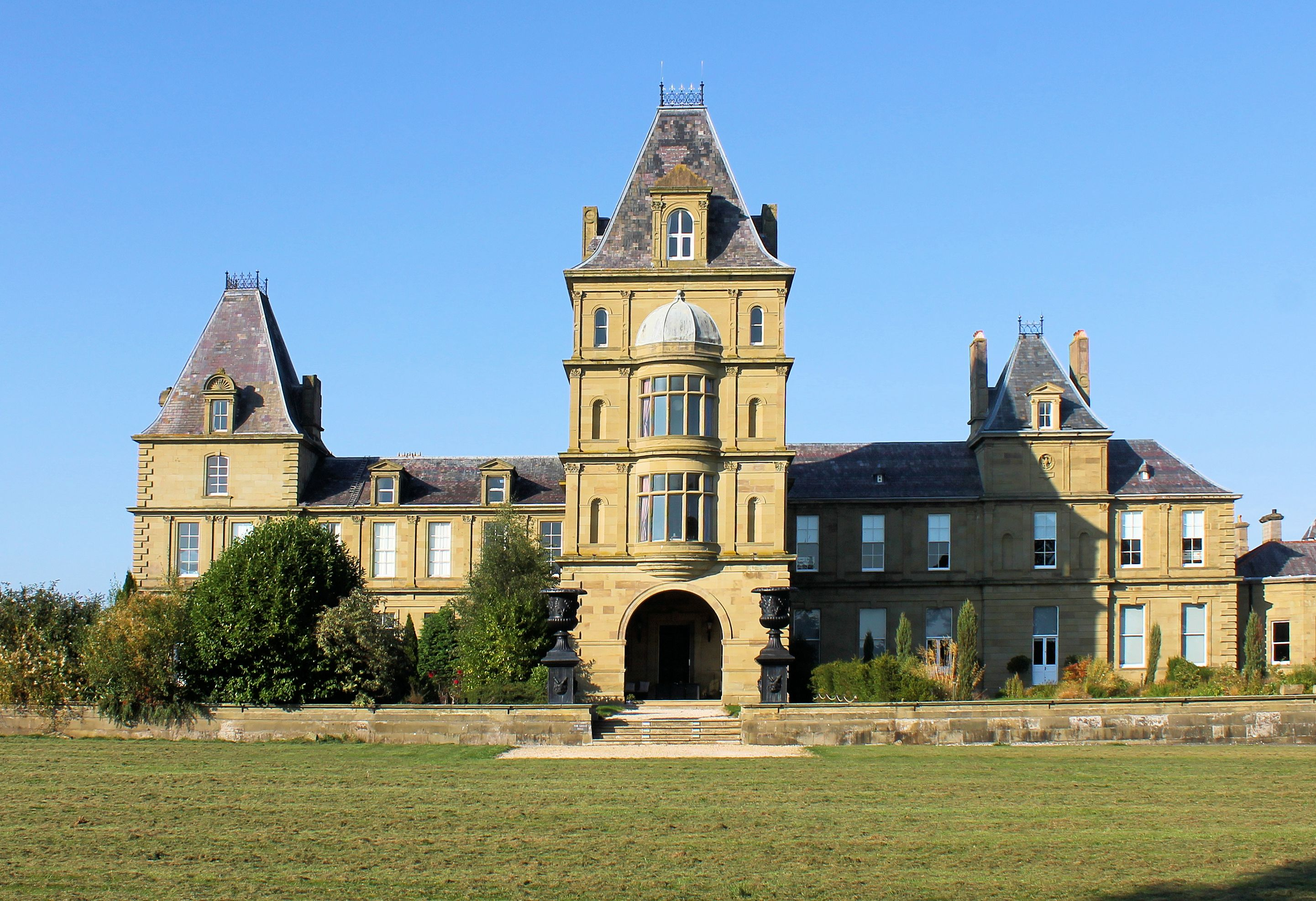
Wynnstay Hall, Ruabon near Wrexham, Wales, seat of the Wynns

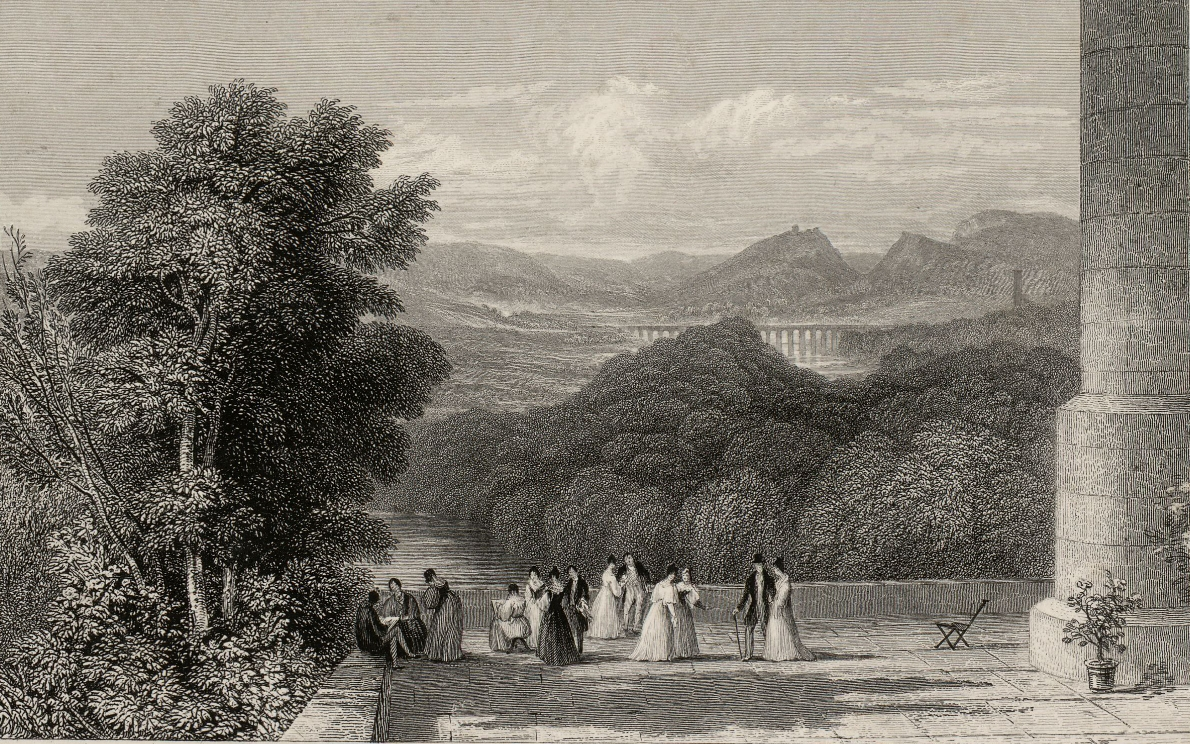
Wynnstay Park

Williams-Wynn was the son of Sir Watkin Williams-Wynn, 4th Baronet and his second wife, Charlotte, daughter of George Grenville, a former Prime Minister, through whose sister Hester's marriage to William Pitt, 1st Earl of Chatham, Williams-Wynn became cousin to Pitt the Younger.

He was educated at Westminster School and Christ Church, Oxford. He succeeded his father in the baronetcy on 29 July 1789. He received Hon. D.C.L. at Oxford in 1793 and was Lord Lieutenant of Merionethshire from 1793 to 1840 and Lord Lieutenant of Denbighshire from 1796 to 1840. In 1819 Williams-Wynn was admitted to Magdalene College, Cambridge and was awarded MA. He declined several offers of a peerage. In later years, Williams-Wynn would return to Westminster School every St. David's Day where he presented all the Welsh boys that he knew with a guinea, and his godson Stapleton Cotton (later Viscount Combermere) with two.

Williams-Wynn was elected Member of Parliament (MP) for Beaumaris in 1794 and held the seat to 1796, when following the end of the parliament his uncle Robert Watkin Wynne retired, enabling him to be elected MP for Denbighshire in his place. He held the seat until his death in 1840.

He served as Mayor of Oswestry in 1800 and 1831, and of Chester in 1813. In 1800 he served as treasurer of the Salop Infirmary in Shrewsbury.

As the largest landowner in North Wales, and controller of many parliamentary seats, he was referred to, at least by himself, as the 'Prince in Wales'. and had a keen interest in military affairs. In 1794 he raised a regiment of fencible cavalry called the "Ancient British Fencibles" and took part in the suppression of the Irish rebellion of 1798, when they were known as "Sir Watkin's lambs" and "a terror of the rebels", acquiring a reputation that he had to defend from charges of cruelty among the Irish. He commanded them until they disbanded in 1800, after Williams-Wynn unsuccessfully requested they be deployed on foreign service. Colonel of the Royal Denbigh Rifles since 1797, he deployed with a militia battalion (3rd Provisional Battalion) largely composed of his own men, to serve under his kinsman the Marquess of Buckingham in France from March to June 1814. Originally intending to link up with the Duke of Wellington's army who had come from Spain before the French armistice intervened, they were garrisoned in Bordeaux where he was known among local people as "le gros commandant Whof Whof Whof". He also became Colonel commanding the Denbighshire Yeomanry Cavalry in 1820 and was Welsh Militia aide-de-camp to King William IV from 1830 to 1837 and to Queen Victoria from 1837 until his death.

He grew to be a portly man of seventeen and a half stone (238 pounds (108 kg)), which sometimes caused chairs to collapse under him, and Lady Holland, in her Journal (volume I, page 238), commented: "Sir Watkin is a Grenville in person and manner all over him; his tongue is immensely too big for his mouth and his utterance is so impeded by it that what he attempts to articulate is generally unintelligible." From the winter of 1826–27, when he contracted erysipelas, he was affected by varying degrees of deafness at their worst in 1831.

He died at Wynnstay Hall, aged 67, on 6 January 1840, and was buried at Ruabon, Denbighshire. His namesake son Watkin Williams-Wynn succeeded to the baronetcy and was also MP for Denbighshire.

== Family ==
Williams-Wynn married Lady Henrietta Antonia Clive, eldest daughter of Edward Clive, 1st Earl of Powis, and the former Lady Henrietta Herbert, on 4 February 1817. His wife predeceased him on 22 December 1835, aged 49.

== Coat of arms ==
Coat of arms of Sir Watkin Williams-Wynn, 5th Baronet
Crest An eagle displayed or. Escutcheon Quarterly, 1st and 4th, Vert three eagles displayed in fesse or (Wynn), 2nd and 3rd, Argent two foxes counter-salient Gules the dexter surmounted of the sinister (Williams). Motto Eryr Eryror Eryri (The eagle of the eagles of Snowdon)

== Notes ==
Parliament of Great Britain
Preceded by Sir Hugh Williams, Bt	Member of Parliament for Beaumaris; 1794–1796	Succeeded by The Lord Newborough
Preceded by Robert Watkin Wynne	Member of Parliament for Denbighshire; 1796–1800	Succeeded by Parliament of the United Kingdom
Parliament of the United Kingdom
Preceded by Parliament of Great Britain	Member of Parliament for Denbighshire; 1801–1840; With: Robert Myddleton-Biddulph 1832–1835; William Bagot from 1835	Succeeded by Hugh Cholmondeley; William Bagot
Honorary titles
Preceded by Watkin Williams	Lord Lieutenant of Merionethshire; 1793–1840	Succeeded by Edward Lloyd-Mostyn
Vacant Title last held by Richard Myddelton	Lord Lieutenant of Denbighshire; 1796–1840	Succeeded by Robert Myddelton Biddulph
Baronetage of England
Preceded by Watkin Williams-Wynn	Baronet (of Gray's Inn); 1789–1840	Succeeded by Watkin Williams-Wynn
