= 1850s in Wales =

- 1840s | 1860s | Other years in Wales
- Other events of the decade

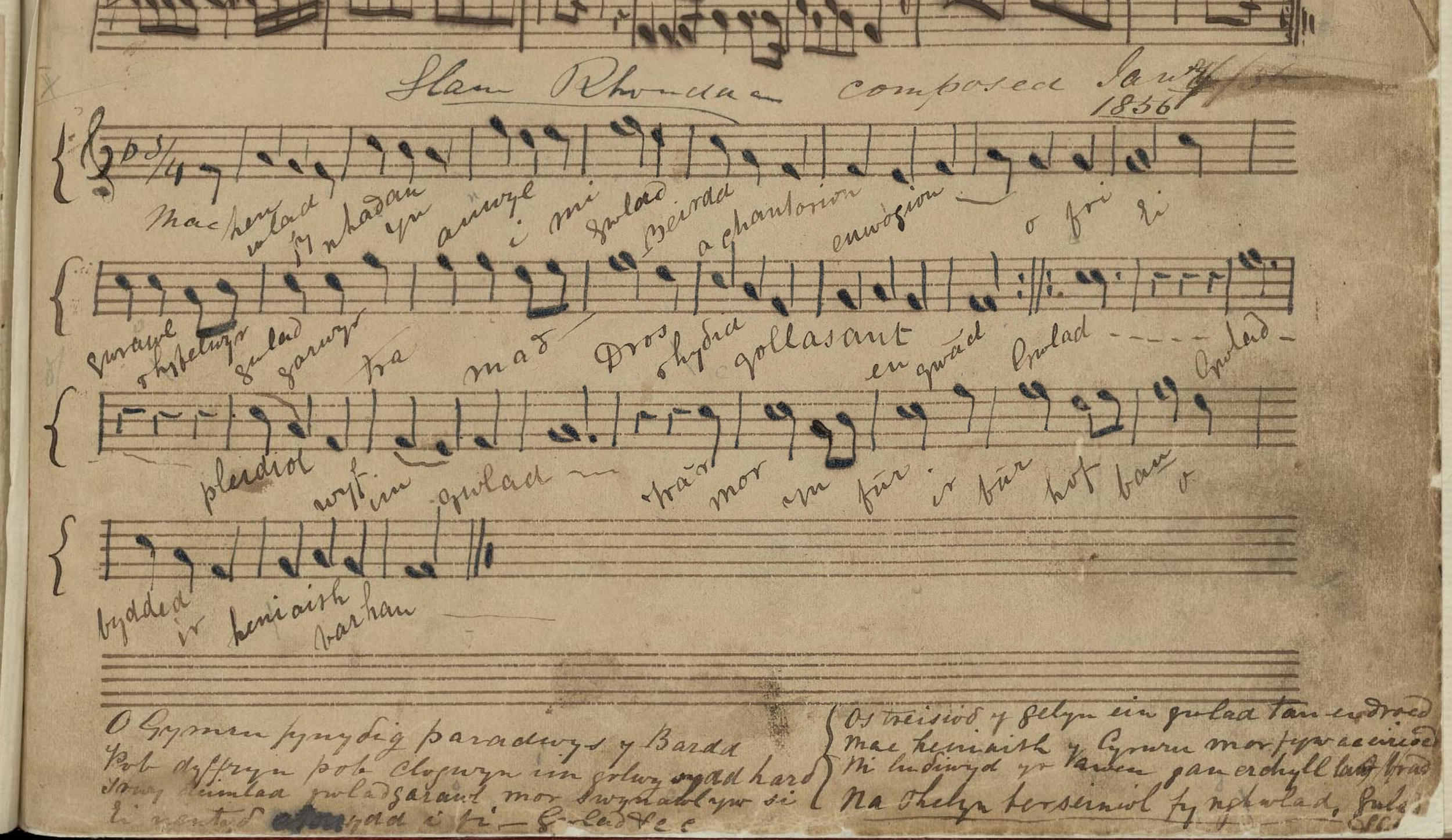
The earliest known copy of the Welsh national anthem

This article is about the particular significance of the decade 1850–1859 to Wales and its people.

== Events ==
- 1850
- 1851
- 1852
- 1853
- 1854
- 1855
- 1856
- 1857
- 1858
- 1859

== Arts and literature ==
=== Awards ===
National Eisteddfod of Wales

- 1853 — "Islwyn" wins the crown at the Abergavenny eisteddfod.
- 1858 — "Great Eisteddfod" at Llangollen; early appearance of Gorsedd ceremony.

=== New books ===
- Anne Beale — Gladys of Harlech (1858)
- John Blackwell (Alun) — Ceinion Alun (1851; posthumously published)
- B. B. Davies — The History of Wales (1853)
- Samuel Evans (Gomerydd) — Y Gomerydd (1854)
- John Ceiriog Hughes — Gohebiaethau Syr Meurig Crynswth (vol. 1) (1856)
- Aneurin Jones — Tafol y Beirdd(1852)
  - John Jones (Talhaiarn) — Gwaith Talhaiarn, vol. 1 (1855)
- Owen Wynne Jones
  - Fy Oriau Hamddenol (1854)
  - Dafydd Llwyd (1857)
  - Lleucu Llwyd (1858)
- Robert Parry (Robyn Ddu Eryri) — Teithiau a Barddoniaeth Robyn Ddu Eryri (1857)
- William Rees (Gwilym Hiraethog)
  - Aelwyd F'Ewythr Robert (1852)
  - Gweithiau Barddonol Gwilym Hiraethog (1855)
- William Thomas (Islwyn) — Barddoniaeth (1854)
- William Thomas (Gwilym Marles) — Prydyddiaeth (1859)
- Morris Williams (Nicander) — Y Psalmwyr (1850)
- William Williams (Creuddynfab) — Y Barddoniadur (1855)

=== Music ===
- Y Blwch Cerddorol (collection of hymns and anthems) (1854)
- Thomas Jones (Gogrynwr) — Gweddi Habacuc (cantata) (1851)
- J. Ambrose Lloyd — Teyrnasoedd y Ddaear (1852)
- Edward Stephen (Tanymarian) — Ystorm Tiberias (oratorio) (1852)
- January 1856 — The Welsh national anthem, Hen Wlad Fy Nhadau, is composed by James James with lyrics by his father Evan James.
