= 1857 in Wales =

- Centuries: 17th; 18th; 19th; 20th; 21st
- Decades: 1830s; 1840s; 1850s; 1860s; 1870s
- See also: List of years in Wales; Timeline of Welsh history 1857 in The United Kingdom Scotland Elsewhere

This article is about the particular significance of the year 1857 to Wales and its people.

== Incumbents ==
- Lord Lieutenant of Anglesey – Henry Paget, 2nd Marquess of Anglesey
- Lord Lieutenant of Brecknockshire – John Lloyd Vaughan Watkins
- Lord Lieutenant of Caernarvonshire – Sir Richard Williams-Bulkeley, 10th Baronet
- Lord Lieutenant of Cardiganshire – Thomas Lloyd, Coedmore (until 12 July); Edward Pryse (from 14 September)
- Lord Lieutenant of Carmarthenshire – John Campbell, 1st Earl Cawdor
- Lord Lieutenant of Denbighshire – Robert Myddelton Biddulph
- Lord Lieutenant of Flintshire – Sir Stephen Glynne, 9th Baronet
- Lord Lieutenant of Glamorgan – Christopher Rice Mansel Talbot
- Lord Lieutenant of Merionethshire – Robert Davies Pryce
- Lord Lieutenant of Monmouthshire – Capel Hanbury Leigh
- Lord Lieutenant of Montgomeryshire – Charles Hanbury-Tracy, 1st Baron Sudeley
- Lord Lieutenant of Pembrokeshire – Sir John Owen, 1st Baronet
- Lord Lieutenant of Radnorshire – John Walsh, 1st Baron Ormathwaite
- Bishop of Bangor – Christopher Bethell
- Bishop of Llandaff – Alfred Ollivant
- Bishop of St Asaph – Thomas Vowler Short
- Bishop of St Davids – Connop Thirlwall

== Events ==
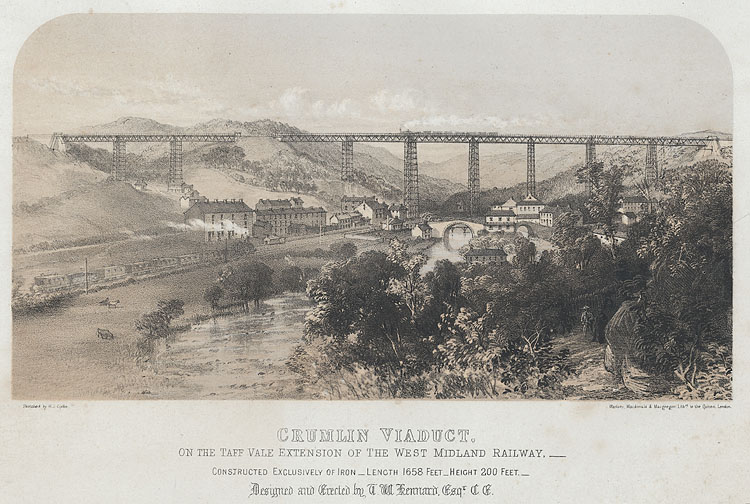
Crumlin Viaduct

- 4 March — Thomas Gee launches the radical nonconformist newspaper Baner Cymru in Denbigh.
- 24 March — 1857 United Kingdom general election, concludes. Anglesey antiquarian William Owen Stanley becomes Whig MP for the Beaumaris District of Boroughs.
- 6 May — Samuel Roberts (S. R.) sails for Tennessee.
- 1 June — Opening of the Crumlin Viaduct, built to carry the Taff Vale Extension of the Newport, Abergavenny and Hereford Railway.
- 10 August — John Bowen is consecrated as Bishop of Sierra Leone.
- 13 August — Eugene Goddard crosses the Menai Strait in his gas balloon Aurora from Caernarfon Castle to Llanidan.
- 3 October — The Newport Gazette is founded by William Nicholas Johns.
- 14 October — Four people are killed in a railway accident near Pyle.
- 29 October — St Deiniol's Church, Hawarden, badly damaged by arson.
- Autumn — Aberdare Strike 1857-8 against reductions in coal miners' pay begins.
- Railway workers go on strike at Aberdare.

== Arts and literature ==
=== New books ===
==== English language ====
- Richard Williams Morgan — The British Kymry or Britons of Cambria

==== Welsh language ====
- Owen Wynne Jones — Dafydd Llwyd
- Robert Parry (Robyn Ddu Eryri) — Teithiau a Barddoniaeth Robyn Ddu Eryri

=== Music ===
- John Ashton — "Trefeglwys" (hymn tune)

== Births ==
- 2 February — Sir James Cory, 1st Baronet, politician and ship-owner (died 1933)
- 7 February — Windham Henry Wyndham-Quin, 5th Earl Dunraven (died 1952)
- 28 February — Charlie Newman, Wales rugby union captain (died 1922)
- 27 April — Alfred Cattell, Wales international rugby player (died 1933)
- 12 May — Sarah Jacob, the "fasting girl" (died 1869)
- 20 June — Dan Griffiths, Wales international rugby player (died 1936)
- 28 June — Sir Robert Jones, 1st Baronet, orthopaedic surgeon (died 1933)
- 1 July — Martha Hughes Cannon, women's rights activist and politician in the United States (died 1932)
- 19 September — James Bridie, Scottish-born Wales international rugby union player (died 1893 in England)
- 8 November — Frank Purdon, Wales rugby union international
- 14 November — John Thomas Rees, musician (died 1949)
- 2 December — Sir Robert Armstrong-Jones, surgeon (died 1943)
- Llewellyn Cadwaladr, operatic tenor (died 1909)

== Deaths ==
- 3 January — Richard Philipps, 1st Baron Milford (second creation), 55
- 23 January — Edward Anwyl, Wesleyan minister and teacher, 70
- 10 February — David Thompson, explorer of Welsh parentage, 86
- 29 March — Elijah Waring, writer, ±69
- 16 May — Sir William Lloyd, soldier and mountaineer, 74
- 13 June — Daniel Rees, hymn-writer, 64
- 12 July — Thomas Lloyd, Coedmore, Lord Lieutenant of Cardiganshire, 64
- 12 August — William Daniel Conybeare, dean of Llandaff, 70
- 16 August — John Jones, Talysarn, leading non-conformist minister, 61

== See also ==
- 1857 in Ireland
