= 1858 in Wales =

- Centuries: 17th; 18th; 19th; 20th; 21st
- Decades: 1830s; 1840s; 1850s; 1860s; 1870s
- See also: List of years in Wales; Timeline of Welsh history 1858 in The United Kingdom Scotland Elsewhere

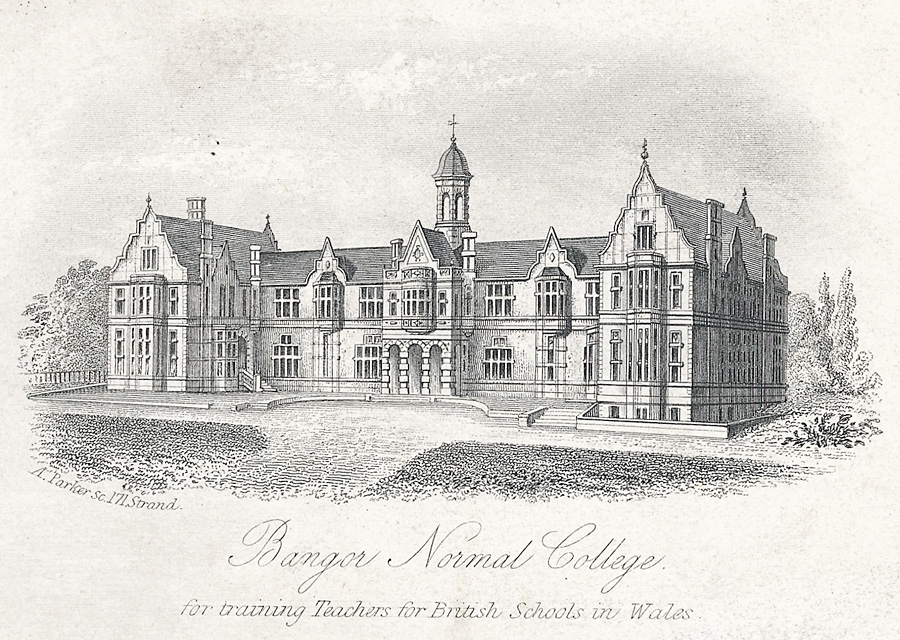
A view of the building at Bangor Normal College.

This article is about the particular significance of the year 1858 to Wales and its people.

== Incumbents ==
- Lord Lieutenant of Anglesey – Henry Paget, 2nd Marquess of Anglesey
- Lord Lieutenant of Brecknockshire – John Lloyd Vaughan Watkins
- Lord Lieutenant of Caernarvonshire – Sir Richard Williams-Bulkeley, 10th Baronet
- Lord Lieutenant of Cardiganshire – Edward Pryse
- Lord Lieutenant of Carmarthenshire – John Campbell, 1st Earl Cawdor
- Lord Lieutenant of Denbighshire – Robert Myddelton Biddulph
- Lord Lieutenant of Flintshire – Sir Stephen Glynne, 9th Baronet
- Lord Lieutenant of Glamorgan – Christopher Rice Mansel Talbot
- Lord Lieutenant of Merionethshire – Robert Davies Pryce
- Lord Lieutenant of Monmouthshire – Capel Hanbury Leigh
- Lord Lieutenant of Montgomeryshire – Charles Hanbury-Tracy, 1st Baron Sudeley (until 10 February); Thomas Hanbury-Tracy, 2nd Baron Sudeley (from 4 March)
- Lord Lieutenant of Pembrokeshire – Sir John Owen, 1st Baronet
- Lord Lieutenant of Radnorshire – John Walsh, 1st Baron Ormathwaite
- Bishop of Bangor – Christopher Bethell
- Bishop of Llandaff – Alfred Ollivant
- Bishop of St Asaph – Thomas Vowler Short
- Bishop of St Davids – Connop Thirlwall

== Events ==
- January
  - Teaching begins at Bangor Normal College, founded by Hugh Owen.
  - End of Aberdare Strike 1857-8 in the coal mining industry.
- 20 April – John Jones (Shoni Sguborfawr) is given a conditional pardon for his role in the Rebecca Riots.
- June – Erection of the Town Clock at Tredegar.
- 20 June – End of the Indian Rebellion of 1857, which Major General Charles Hinde plays a major role in suppressing.
- 29 August – Musician Robert Davies (Asaph Llechid) is killed by a rockfall while at work in Cae-braich-y-cafn quarry.
- 5 October – The Vale of Clwyd Railway, built by David Davies Llandinam, is opened.
- 13 October – 20 men are killed in a mining accident at Lower Duffryn Colliery, Mountain Ash.
- date unknown
  - The schooner Mary Catherine, launched at Amlwch, is the first iron ship built in Wales.
  - Richard Kyrke Penson exhibits a plan of his design for the Cilyrychen lime kilns at the Royal Academy.

== Arts and literature ==
=== Awards ===
- "Great Eisteddfod" at Llangollen; early appearance of Gorsedd ceremony. Ebenezer Thomas (Eben Fardd) wins first prize for his poem Maes Bosworth.

=== New books ===
==== English language ====
- William Davies (Gwilym Teilo) — Llandilo-Vawr and its Neighbourhood
- Robert Owen — An Introduction to the Study of Dogmatic Theology
- Louisa M. Spooner (anonymously) — Gladys of Harlech
- Alfred Russel Wallace — On the Tendency of Varieties to Depart Indefinitely From the Original Type

==== Welsh language ====
- Morgan Howells — Gweithiau Morgan Howells ... pregethau a thraethodau (posthumously published)
- Owen Wynne Jones — Lleucu Llwyd

=== Music ===
- Thomas Gruffydd Jones (Tafalaw Bencerdd) — Y Drysorfa Gorawl
- Edward Stephen (Tanymarian) — Requiem

== Births ==
- 6 January — Ben Davies, singer (died 1943)
- 28 January — Edgeworth David, explorer (died 1934)
- 9 April — Aneurin Rees, Wales rugby union international (died 1932)
- 15 May — B. B. Mann, Wales rugby union international (died 1948)
- 8 October — Robert Owen Hughes (Elfyn), journalist and poet (died 1919)
- 25 October — Tom Clapp, Wales rugby union captain (died 1933)
- 30 October - Alfred Onions, politician (died 1921)
- 18 December — Sir Owen Thomas, soldier and politician (died 1923)
- 25 December — Frederick Margrave, rugby player (died 1946)
- 26 December — Sir Owen Morgan Edwards, academic and author (died 1920)
- 27 December — Sir John Herbert Lewis, lawyer and politician (died 1933)
- 28 December — Josiah Towyn Jones, politician (died 1925)

== Deaths ==
- 10 February — Charles Hanbury-Tracy, 1st Baron Sudeley, Lord Lieutenant of Montgomeryshire, 79
- 22 March — Mary Anne Edmunds, educator and feminist, 41
- 26 March — William Morgan, evangelical clergyman, friend of the Bronte family, 75/6
- 19 April — John Davies, Unitarian minister and teacher, 62/63
- 13 May — Lewis Loyd, banker, 91
- 30 May — Thomas ap Catesby Jones, Welsh-descended US naval officer, 68
- 4 June — Thomas Edwards (Caerfallwch), lexicographer, 78
- 16 October — Charles Norris, artist, 79
- 17 November — Robert Owen, founder of the Co-operative Society, 87
- 20 November — Sir Joseph Bailey, 1st Baronet, ironmaster, 75
- 18 December — John Salusbury Piozzi Salusbury, nephew of Hester Thrale, 65
- 27 December — John Williams, Archdeacon of Cardigan and warden of Llandovery College, 66

== See also ==
- 1858 in Ireland
