= 1854 in Wales =

- Centuries: 17th; 18th; 19th; 20th; 21st
- Decades: 1830s; 1840s; 1850s; 1860s; 1870s
- See also: List of years in Wales; Timeline of Welsh history 1854 in The United Kingdom Scotland Elsewhere

This article is about the particular significance of the year 1854 to Wales and its people.

== Incumbents ==
- Lord Lieutenant of Anglesey – Henry Paget, 1st Marquess of Anglesey (until 29 April); Henry Paget, 2nd Marquess of Anglesey (from 17 May)
- Lord Lieutenant of Brecknockshire – John Lloyd Vaughan Watkins
- Lord Lieutenant of Caernarvonshire – Sir Richard Williams-Bulkeley, 10th Baronet
- Lord Lieutenant of Cardiganshire – William Edward Powell (until 10 April); Thomas Lloyd, Coedmore (from 16 September)
- Lord Lieutenant of Carmarthenshire – John Campbell, 1st Earl Cawdor
- Lord Lieutenant of Denbighshire – Robert Myddelton Biddulph
- Lord Lieutenant of Flintshire – Sir Stephen Glynne, 9th Baronet
- Lord Lieutenant of Glamorgan – Christopher Rice Mansel Talbot
- Lord Lieutenant of Merionethshire – Edward Lloyd-Mostyn, 2nd Baron Mostyn (until 3 April); Robert Davies Pryce (from 7 May)
- Lord Lieutenant of Monmouthshire – Capel Hanbury Leigh
- Lord Lieutenant of Montgomeryshire – Charles Hanbury-Tracy, 1st Baron Sudeley
- Lord Lieutenant of Pembrokeshire – Sir John Owen, 1st Baronet
- Lord Lieutenant of Radnorshire – John Walsh, 1st Baron Ormathwaite
- Bishop of Bangor – Christopher Bethell
- Bishop of Llandaff – Alfred Ollivant
- Bishop of St Asaph – Thomas Vowler Short
- Bishop of St Davids – Connop Thirlwall

== Events ==
- Late August — Third cholera pandemic in Cardiff.
- 31 October — David Davies (Dai'r Cantwr) receives a conditional pardon for his role in the Rebecca Riots.
- 5 November — At the Battle of Inkerman, Hugh Rowlands carries out the actions that lead to his becoming the first Welshman to win the Victoria Cross.
- 11 November — In Australia, Welsh-born John Basson Humffray is elected the first president of the Ballarat Reform League.
- unknown dates
  - Thorne Island fortification completed.
  - Betsi Cadwaladr volunteers to serve as a nurse in the Crimean War.
  - Love Jones-Parry is High Sheriff of Caernarvonshire.
  - The Telegraphic Despatch is published in Swansea, the first newspaper in Wales to come out more than once a week.
  - A penny newspaper, the Herald Cymraeg, is founded at Caernarfon, with James Evans as editor.
  - John Williams (Ab Ithel) becomes editor of the Cambrian Journal.

== Arts and literature ==
=== New books ===
==== English language ====
- Thomas Prichard — The Heroines of Welsh History
- Samuel Prideaux Tregelles — Account of the Printed Text of the New Testament

==== Welsh language ====
- John Edwards (Eos Glan Twrch) — Llais o'r Llwyn: sef Barddoniaeth, ar Amryfal Destynau
- Samuel Evans (Gomerydd) — Y Gomerydd
- Owen Wynne Jones — Fy Oriau Hamddenol
- William Thomas (Islwyn) — Barddoniaeth

=== Music ===
- David Richards — Y Blwch Cerddorol (collection of hymns and anthems)

== Births ==
- 1 January — Peter Morris, baseball player (died 1884 in the United States)
- 8 April — Robert Arthur Williams (Berw), clergyman and poet (died 1926)
- 17 April — Sir John Eldon Bankes, judge (died 1946)
- 30 April — William Critchlow Harris, Welsh-Canadian architect (died 1913)
- 10 July — John Lloyd Williams, botanist and composer (died 1945)
- 16 December — J. D. Rees, colonial administrator (died 1922)

== Deaths ==
- 14 January — Charles Rodney Morgan, politician, 25
- 3 April — Edward Lloyd, 1st Baron Mostyn, politician, 85
- 10 April — William Edward Powell, politician, 66
- 29 April — Henry Paget, 1st Marquess of Anglesey, soldier and politician, 85
- 24 May — John Rowlands of Y Llys, alleged father of Sir Henry Morton Stanley, 39
- 12 November — Charles Kemble, actor, 79
- 28 December — Rowland Williams, clergyman and writer, 75
- 29 December — Joseph Tregelles Price, industrialist, 70

== See also ==
- 1854 in Ireland
