= 1856 in Wales =

- Centuries: 17th; 18th; 19th; 20th; 21st
- Decades: 1830s; 1840s; 1850s; 1860s; 1870s
- See also: List of years in Wales; Timeline of Welsh history 1856 in The United Kingdom Scotland Elsewhere

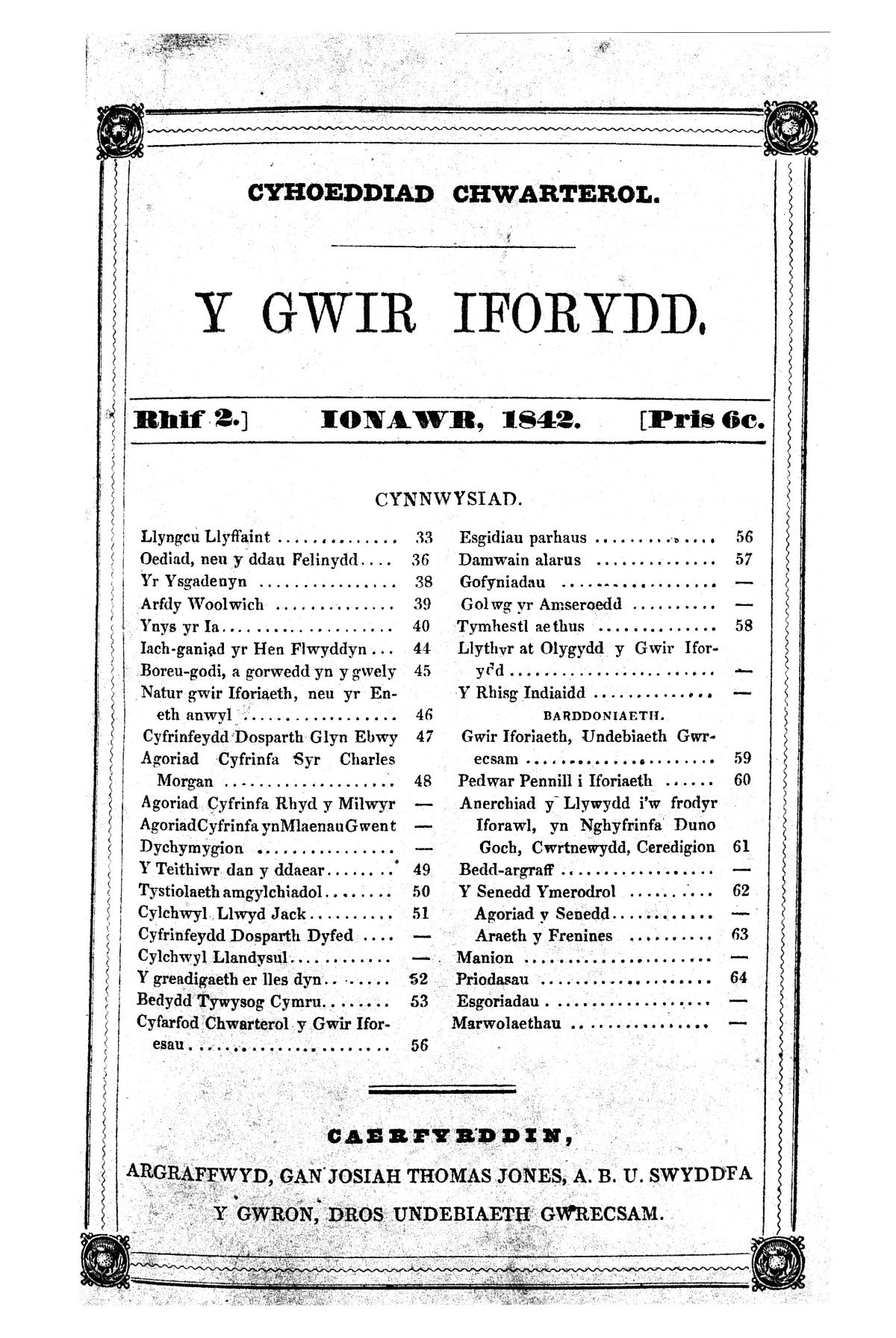
The quarterly Welsh language general periodical of the Wrexham Union of the True Ivorites Society

This article is about the particular significance of the year 1856 to Wales and its people.

== Incumbents ==
- Lord Lieutenant of Anglesey – Henry Paget, 2nd Marquess of Anglesey
- Lord Lieutenant of Brecknockshire – John Lloyd Vaughan Watkins
- Lord Lieutenant of Caernarvonshire – Sir Richard Williams-Bulkeley, 10th Baronet
- Lord Lieutenant of Cardiganshire – Thomas Lloyd, Coedmore
- Lord Lieutenant of Carmarthenshire – John Campbell, 1st Earl Cawdor
- Lord Lieutenant of Denbighshire – Robert Myddelton Biddulph
- Lord Lieutenant of Flintshire – Sir Stephen Glynne, 9th Baronet
- Lord Lieutenant of Glamorgan – Christopher Rice Mansel Talbot
- Lord Lieutenant of Merionethshire – Edward Lloyd-Mostyn, 2nd Baron Mostyn
- Lord Lieutenant of Monmouthshire – Capel Hanbury Leigh
- Lord Lieutenant of Montgomeryshire – Charles Hanbury-Tracy, 1st Baron Sudeley
- Lord Lieutenant of Pembrokeshire – Sir John Owen, 1st Baronet
- Lord Lieutenant of Radnorshire – John Walsh, 1st Baron Ormathwaite
- Bishop of Bangor – Christopher Bethell
- Bishop of Llandaff – Alfred Ollivant
- Bishop of St Asaph – Thomas Vowler Short
- Bishop of St Davids – Connop Thirlwall

== Events ==
- 6 February – The sailing ship Grand Duke is wrecked off St Govan's Head, with the loss of 29 lives.
- 10 March – John Jones (Shoni Sguborfawr) is sentenced to three months hard labour for drunkenness.
- May – John Frost is given an unconditional pardon for his role in the Newport Chartist demonstrations of 1839.
- 3 July – 11 men are killed in a mining accident at Coalbrookdale, Nantyglo.
- 15 July – 114 men and boys are killed in a mining accident at Cymmer Old Pit, Porth, Rhondda.
- 16 September – The Festiniog Railway publishes its first printed timetable.
- 8 September – At the Siege of Sevastopol in the Crimean War, Corporal Robert Shields of the 23rd Regiment of Foot recovers a fatally wounded officer from an exposed position, an action for which he will receive the Victoria Cross.
- unknown dates
  - Troops are sent into Talargoch in Flintshire to deal with an industrial dispute involving lead miners.
  - Fishguard becomes the first county court in Wales to close.
  - Halkyn-born Mormon missionary Dan Jones returns to the United States on conclusion of his second (4-year) mission for the Church of Jesus Christ of Latter-day Saints with between 550 and 700 Welsh saints bound for Salt Lake City.
  - Richard Cory sells his provision business and begins to trade as "Richard Cory and Sons" in the coal and shipping business.
  - Pryce Pryce-Jones takes over a drapery business in Newtown and begins to trade as the "Royal Welsh Warehouse", a mail order business.
  - The estate around Dinas Mawddwy is purchased by Lancashire industrialist Edmund Buckley.
  - Jane Williams (Ysgafell) returns to her native London, where she remains until her death nearly thirty years later.

== Arts and literature ==
- Summer – Marian Evans (who has not yet adopted the pseudonym George Eliot) drafts "The Sad Fortunes of the Reverend Amos Barton", the first of her Scenes of Clerical Life (1857) and her first work of fiction, while holidaying at Tenby.

=== New books ===
==== English language ====
- Erasmus Jones – The Higher Law Triumphant: The Captive Youths of Judah
- Samuel Prideaux Tregelles – An Introduction to the Textual Criticism of the New Testament
- Jane Williams (Ysgafell) – The Origin, Rise, and Progress of the Paper People

==== Welsh language ====
- John Ceiriog Hughes – Gohebiaethau Syr Meurig Crynswth (vol. 1)
- John Jones (Ioan Emlyn) – Tiriad y Ffrancodym Mhencaer
- John Williams (Ab Ithel) – Dosparth Edeyrn Davod Aur

=== Music ===
- January – The Welsh national anthem, Hen Wlad Fy Nhadau, is composed by James James with lyrics by his father Evan James.

== Births ==
- 2 January – John Viriamu Jones, academic (died 1901)
- 26 March – David Alfred Thomas, 1st Viscount Rhondda, politician (died 1918)
- 1 April – Walter Jenkin Evans, academic (died 1927)
- 15 April – James Bevan, first Wales rugby union captain (died 1938)
- 15 June – Richard Garnons Williams, soldier and Wales international rugby union player (died 1915)
- 11 October – Sir Harry Reichel, academic (died 1931)
- 20 December – Egerton Phillimore, scholar (died 1937)

== Deaths ==
- 3 January – Thomas Richard, minister, 72
- 18 February – James Morgan, engineer, 80?
- 28 March – Henry Watkins Williams-Wynn, politician, 73
- May – Thomas Robert Jones, founder of the Philanthropic Order of True Ivorites, 54
- 28 May – John Bryan, minister, 79/80
- 29 June – Peter Jones, Welsh-descended missionary, 54
- 14 August – Rev William Buckland, palaeontologist and discoverer of the "Red Lady of Paviland", 72

== See also ==
- 1856 in Ireland
