= 1853 in Wales =

- Centuries: 17th; 18th; 19th; 20th; 21st
- Decades: 1830s; 1840s; 1850s; 1860s; 1870s
- See also: List of years in Wales; Timeline of Welsh history 1853 in The United Kingdom Scotland Elsewhere

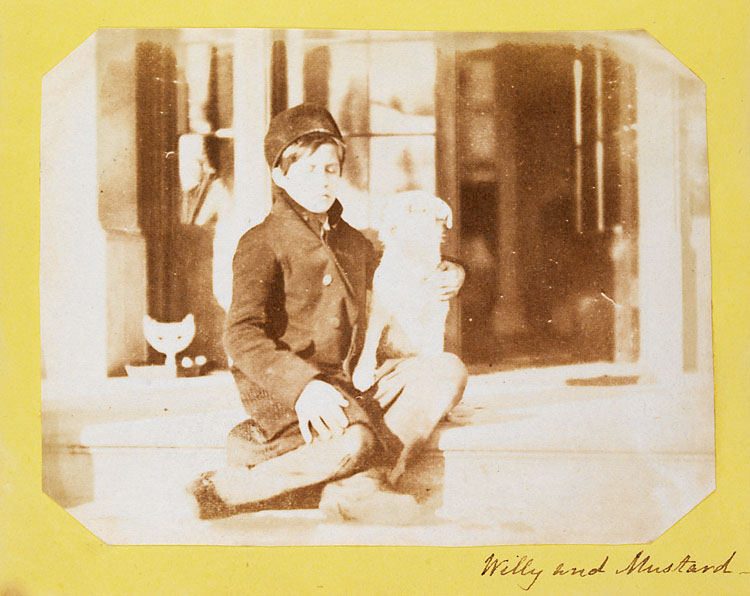

This article is about the particular significance of the year 1853 to Wales and its people.

== Incumbents ==
- Lord Lieutenant of Anglesey – Henry Paget, 1st Marquess of Anglesey
- Lord Lieutenant of Brecknockshire – John Lloyd Vaughan Watkins
- Lord Lieutenant of Caernarvonshire – Sir Richard Williams-Bulkeley, 10th Baronet
- Lord Lieutenant of Cardiganshire – William Edward Powell
- Lord Lieutenant of Carmarthenshire – John Campbell, 1st Earl Cawdor
- Lord Lieutenant of Denbighshire – Robert Myddelton Biddulph
- Lord Lieutenant of Flintshire – Sir Stephen Glynne, 9th Baronet
- Lord Lieutenant of Glamorgan – Christopher Rice Mansel Talbot (from 4 May)
- Lord Lieutenant of Merionethshire – Edward Lloyd-Mostyn, 2nd Baron Mostyn
- Lord Lieutenant of Monmouthshire – Capel Hanbury Leigh
- Lord Lieutenant of Montgomeryshire – Charles Hanbury-Tracy, 1st Baron Sudeley
- Lord Lieutenant of Pembrokeshire – Sir John Owen, 1st Baronet
- Lord Lieutenant of Radnorshire – John Walsh, 1st Baron Ormathwaite
- Bishop of Bangor – Christopher Bethell
- Bishop of Llandaff – Alfred Ollivant
- Bishop of St Asaph – Thomas Vowler Short
- Bishop of St Davids – Connop Thirlwall

== Events ==
- 23 January — Six members of the Rhyl lifeboat crew are drowned when the boat overturns.
- 11 November — Approval is given for the opening of the Vale of Neath Railway line from Gelli Tarw to Merthyr Tydfil, which had been postponed on safety grounds.
- date unknown
  - David Williams (Alaw Goch) opens a new colliery at Cwmdare.
  - Blaenavon Ironworks adopts the hot blast process.
  - John Williams (Ab Ithel) quarrels with his friend and co-editor Harry Longueville Jones and resigns the editorship of Archaeologia Cambrensis.
  - Two Welsh translations of Uncle Tom's Cabin are published: Caban F'Ewyrth Twm by Hugh Williams (Cadfan) and (an abridged version) Crynodeb o Gaban ‘Newyrth Tom by (probably) Thomas Levi (or William Williams) under the pen-name Y Lefiad.
  - William Roberts (Nefydd) is appointed South Wales agent for the British and Foreign Schools Society.
  - Hugh Owen becomes Chief Clerk of the Poor Law Commission.
  - Robert Fulke Greville the younger returns to his family estate at Milford Haven.

== Arts and literature ==
=== Awards ===
- William Thomas (Islwyn) wins his first major eisteddfod prize at Cefn-Coed-y-Cymer.

=== New books ===
- B. B. Woodward — The History of Wales
- W. Downing Evans — The Gwyddonwyson Wreath
- John Mills (Ieuan Glan Alarch) — British Jews
- Richard Williams Morgan — Raymonde de Monthault, The Lord Marcher
- Thomas Rowland — Welsh Grammar
- William Spurrell — English-Welsh Dictionary
- Isaac Williams — Sermons on the Epistles and Gospels for the Sundays and Holy Days
- Benjamin Thomas Williams — Desirableness of a University for Wales

=== Music ===
- Robert James (Jeduthyn) marries the sister of fellow musician Joseph Parry.

=== Visual arts ===
- John Evan Thomas — John, Marquis of Bute (bronze casting, Cardiff)

== Births ==
- 31 March — John Roberts, missionary (d. 1949 in Wales)
- 20 May — John Owen Williams, Congregational minister, poet and Archdruid (died 1932)
- 20 August — Charles Lewis, rugby player (d. 1923)
- 26 September — Godfrey Darbishire, Wales rugby international player (d. 1889)
- 5 October — Garrod Thomas, physician, philanthropist, magistrate, politician (d. 1889)

== Deaths ==
- 23 January — Sir Love Jones-Parry, army officer and politician, 71
- 27 January — John Iltyd Nicholl, MP and judge, 55
- 18 February — Richard Jones, preacher, 72/73
- 6 April — John Jones, Anglican priest, scholar and literary patron, 70
- 24 April — Thomas Prothero, coal-owner, 73
- 17 November — Henry Somerset, 7th Duke of Beaufort, 61
- 18 November — David Bowen, Felinfoel, Baptist minister, 78

== See also ==
- 1853 in Ireland
