= 1860 in Wales =

- Centuries: 17th; 18th; 19th; 20th; 21st
- Decades: 1840s; 1850s; 1860s; 1870s; 1880s
- See also: List of years in Wales; Timeline of Welsh history 1860 in The United Kingdom Scotland Elsewhere

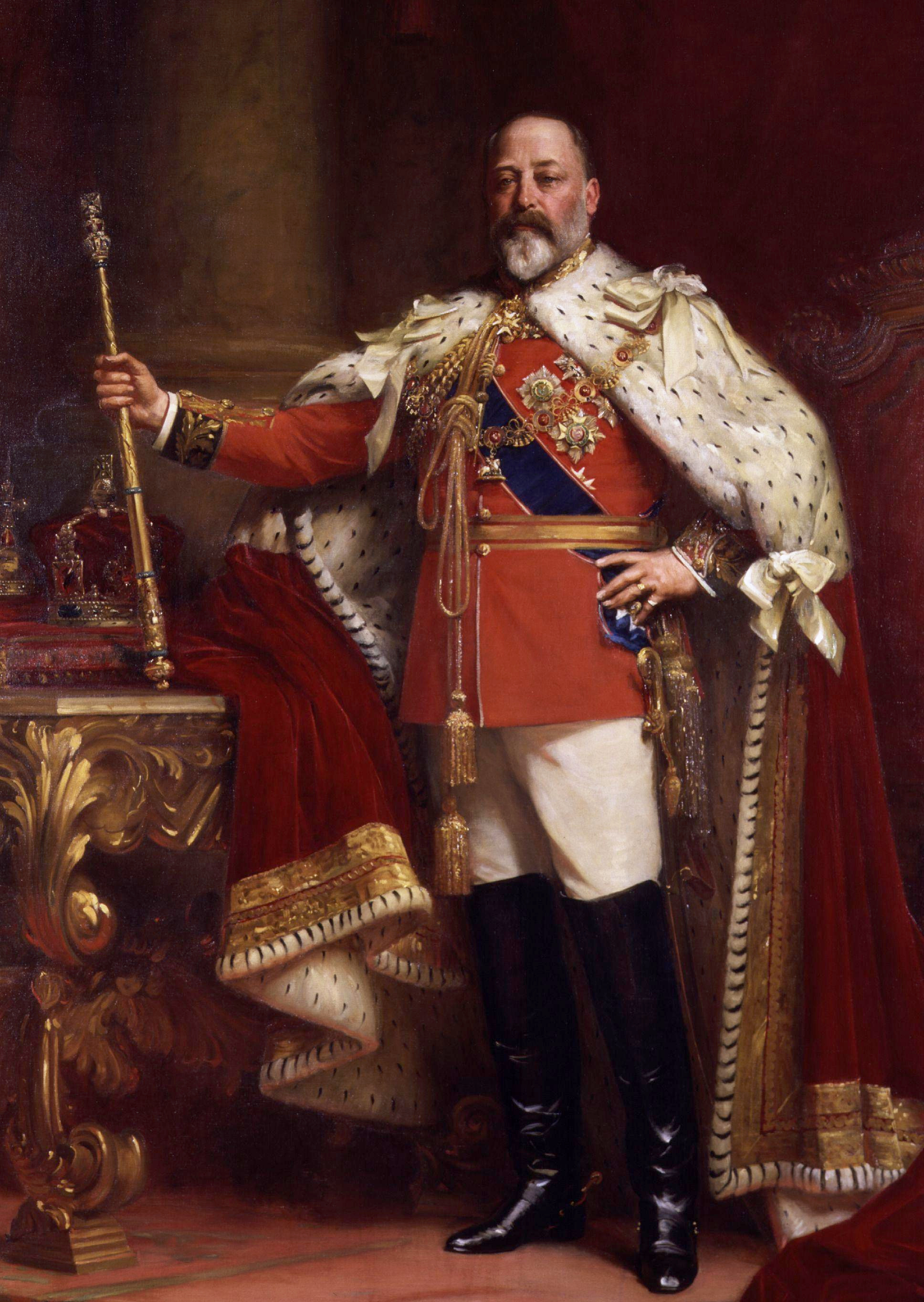
In 1860, Edward undertook the first tour of North America by a Prince of Wales

This article is about the particular significance of the year 1860 to Wales and its people.

== Incumbents ==
- Lord Lieutenant of Anglesey – Henry Paget, 2nd Marquess of Anglesey
- Lord Lieutenant of Brecknockshire – John Lloyd Vaughan Watkins
- Lord Lieutenant of Caernarvonshire – Sir Richard Williams-Bulkeley, 10th Baronet
- Lord Lieutenant of Cardiganshire – Edward Pryse
- Lord Lieutenant of Carmarthenshire – John Campbell, 1st Earl Cawdor (until 7 November)
- Lord Lieutenant of Denbighshire – Robert Myddelton Biddulph
- Lord Lieutenant of Flintshire – Sir Stephen Glynne, 9th Baronet
- Lord Lieutenant of Glamorgan – Christopher Rice Mansel Talbot
- Lord Lieutenant of Merionethshire – Robert Davies Pryce
- Lord Lieutenant of Monmouthshire – Capel Hanbury Leigh
- Lord Lieutenant of Montgomeryshire – Thomas Hanbury-Tracy, 2nd Baron Sudeley
- Lord Lieutenant of Pembrokeshire – Sir John Owen, 1st Baronet
- Lord Lieutenant of Radnorshire – John Walsh, 1st Baron Ormathwaite
- Bishop of Bangor – James Colquhoun Campbell
- Bishop of Llandaff – Alfred Ollivant
- Bishop of St Asaph – Thomas Vowler Short
- Bishop of St Davids – Connop Thirlwall

== Events ==
- 28 February — A paddle steamer, Nimrod, is wrecked off St David's Head, and 45 people are killed.
- 1 March — First section of Carmarthen and Cardigan Railway opens to a station in Carmarthen; on 3 September it extends over the course of what becomes known as the Gwili Railway to Conwil.
- 7 March — HMS Howe, the Royal Navy’s last, largest and fastest wooden first-rate three-decker ship of the line, is launched at Pembroke Dockyard but never completed for sea service.
- 1 May — First section of Oswestry and Newtown Railway opens from Oswestry (Shropshire) to Pool Quay; on 14 August it extends to Welshpool and also opens between Abermule and Newtown. These lines have been built by David Davies Llandinam and Thomas Savin but on 29 October Davies dissolves their partnership.
- 23 August — Consecration of Marble Church, Bodelwyddan.
- 24 November — A statue of Henry Paget, 1st Marquess of Anglesey is added to the column built in his honour by Thomas Harrison earlier in the century.
- 1 December — The sixth underground explosion in the Risca Black Vein Pit at Crosskeys in the Sirhowy Valley of Monmouthshire kills 142 coal miners.
- Discovery of Gwynfynydd Gold Mine gold mine at Dolgellau.
- Founding of the Danygraig Copperworks.
- The Beaufort Tinplate Works is set up on the River Tawe by John Jones Jenkins, 1st Baron Glantawe.
- The Big Pit at Blaenavon begins producing coal.
- Nixon's Navigation Colliery at Mountain Ash opened, becoming the first true deep pit in South Wales.
- Principality Building Society established in Cardiff as the Principality Permanent Benefit Building and Investment Society.
- Four gun batteries are installed on Flat Holm.
- A mosque is founded in Cardiff Bay; it is sometimes incorrectly claimed as the first mosque in the UK.
- Excavation of Holyhead Mountain Hut Circles.
- approx. date — Llanfairpwllgwyngyll on Anglesey adopts the long form of its name.

== Arts and literature ==
=== Awards ===
- At the Denbigh eisteddfod, a decision is made to launch a national eisteddfod.
- An eisteddfod is held at Utica, New York.

=== New books ===
- John Ceiriog Hughes — Oriau'r Hwyr
- Thomas Phillips — The Welsh Revival: Its Origin and Development
- William Rowlands — Dammeg y Mab Afradlon

=== Music ===
- John Owen (Owain Alaw) — Gems of Welsh Melody (including the first Welsh lyric for March of the Men of Harlech, written by John Jones (Talhaiarn), and the first printing of Hen Wlad Fy Nhadau)

== Sport ==
- The first bowls club in Wales is founded at Abergavenny.
- Oswestry Town F.C. is founded.

== Births ==
- 21 February – Sir William Goscombe John, sculptor (died 1952)
- 25 March – Jack Powell, footballer (died 1947
- 29 March – Edward Peake, Wales international rugby union player (died 1945)
- 14 April – Howell Elvet Lewis (Elved), poet and archdruid (died 1953)
- 19 April – William Penfro Rowlands, composer (died 1937)
- 12 May – Sir John Ballinger, librarian (died 1933)
- 24 May – Sir Ellis Ellis-Griffith, lawyer and politician (died 1926)
- 6 June – Sir Herbert Williams-Wynn, 7th Baronet (died 1944)
- 30 July – Richard Summers, Wales rugby union international (died 1941)
- 6 September – George Irby, 6th Baron Boston, landowner and scientist (died 1941)
- 25 September – Thomas Francis Roberts, academic (died 1919)
- 31 December – Horace Lyne, Wales international rugby player and WRU president (died 1949)
- probable
  - Sir William Price (died 1938)

== Deaths ==
- 26 January – Thomas Wood, politician, 82
- 21 March – John Lloyd Davies, politician
- 4 May – William Ormsby-Gore, politician, 81
- 1 July – Robert Thomas, printer and newspaper proprietor who settled in Australia, 78
- 17 July – Beti Cadwaladr, Crimea nurse, 71
- 31 August – John Parker, clergyman and artist, 61
- 7 November – John Campbell, 1st Earl Cawdor, Lord Lieutenant of Carmarthenshire, 69
- 13 November – David Dale Owen, geologist in the USA, 53
- 27 November – Richard Richards, politician, 73

== See also ==
- 1860 in Ireland
