= 1859 in Wales =

- Centuries: 17th; 18th; 19th; 20th; 21st
- Decades: 1830s; 1840s; 1850s; 1860s; 1870s
- See also: List of years in Wales; Timeline of Welsh history 1859 in The United Kingdom Scotland Elsewhere

This article is about the particular significance of the year 1859 to Wales and its people.

== Incumbents ==
- Lord Lieutenant of Anglesey – Henry Paget, 2nd Marquess of Anglesey
- Lord Lieutenant of Brecknockshire – John Lloyd Vaughan Watkins
- Lord Lieutenant of Caernarvonshire – Sir Richard Williams-Bulkeley, 10th Baronet
- Lord Lieutenant of Cardiganshire – Edward Pryse
- Lord Lieutenant of Carmarthenshire – John Campbell, 1st Earl Cawdor
- Lord Lieutenant of Denbighshire – Robert Myddelton Biddulph
- Lord Lieutenant of Flintshire – Sir Stephen Glynne, 9th Baronet
- Lord Lieutenant of Glamorgan – Christopher Rice Mansel Talbot
- Lord Lieutenant of Merionethshire – Robert Davies Pryce
- Lord Lieutenant of Monmouthshire – Capel Hanbury Leigh
- Lord Lieutenant of Montgomeryshire – Thomas Hanbury-Tracy, 2nd Baron Sudeley
- Lord Lieutenant of Pembrokeshire – Sir John Owen, 1st Baronet
- Lord Lieutenant of Radnorshire – John Walsh, 1st Baron Ormathwaite
- Bishop of Bangor – Christopher Bethell (until 9 April); James Colquhoun Campbell (from 14 June)
- Bishop of Llandaff – Alfred Ollivant
- Bishop of St Asaph – Thomas Vowler Short
- Bishop of St Davids – Connop Thirlwall

== Events ==
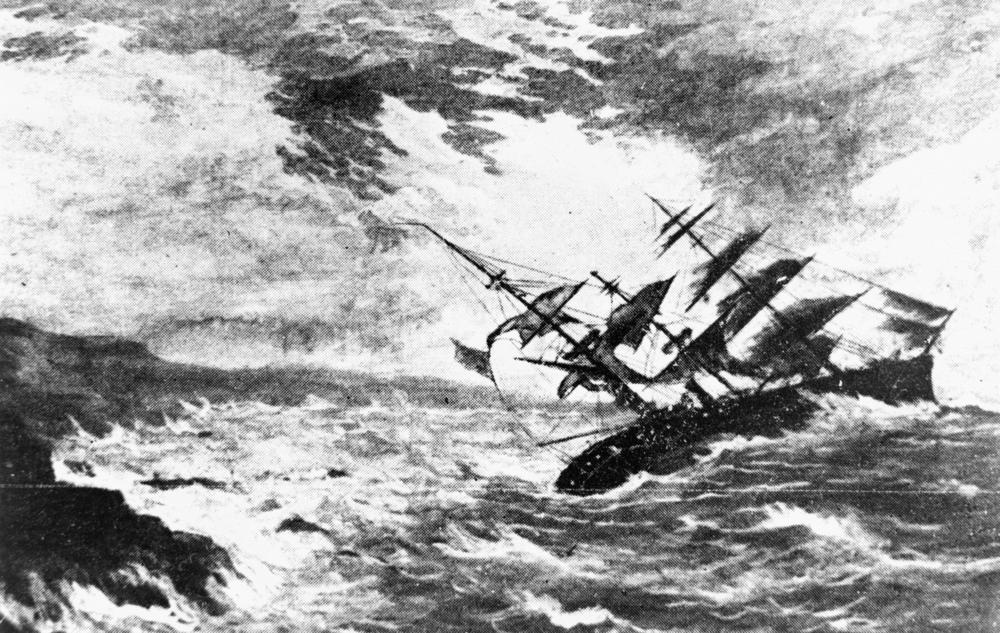
The clipper Royal Charter, wrecked off Anglesey on 26 October

- January - Y Brython changes from weekly to monthly publication.
- February - First race at Bangor-on-Dee racecourse.
- 1 April - Opening of the Corris Railway.
- 5 April - 27 men are killed by flooding at Neath Chain Colliery.
- 31 May - U.K. general election. This is the last general election in which the Conservative Party's vote share in Wales exceeds that in England.
- 29 June - Benjamin Hall is raised to the peerage as 1st Baron Llanover.
- 15 October–17 October - Queen Victoria stays at Penrhyn Castle.
- 25 October–26 October - 'Royal Charter Storm':
  - Steam clipper Royal Charter is wrecked off the north-east Anglesey coast, with the estimated loss of around 459 lives, the greatest loss of life in any maritime accident in Welsh waters.
  - St Brynach's Church, Cwm-yr-Eglwys, is destroyed.
- Peak year for copper production in Wales.
- The final stage of the East Bute Dock, Cardiff, is completed and opened.
- Merger of Yr Amserau and Baner Cymru.
- Religious revival led by Humphrey Jones.
- The Cymanfa Ganu movement is launched in Aberdare.
- Sir Charles Morgan, 3rd Baronet, is created Baron Tredegar.

== Arts and literature ==
=== Awards ===
- Lewis William Lewis (Llew Llwyfo) wins the chair at the Merthyr Tydfil eisteddfod.

=== New books ===
- Hugh Hughes (Tegai) - Y Drydedd Oruchwyliaeth
- Nathaniel Jones - Fy Awenydd
- Richard Parry (Gwalchmai) - Adgofion am John Elias
- Thomas Stephens & Gweirydd ap Rhys - Orgraff yr Iaith Gymraeg
- William Thomas (Gwilym Marles) - Prydyddiaeth

=== Music ===
- John Roberts (Ieuan Gwyllt) - Llyfr Tonau Cynulleidfaol

== Births ==
- 11 January - Sir Joseph Alfred Bradney, historian (died 1933)
- 29 January - Sir George Lockwood Morris, industrialist and Welsh international rugby player (died 1947)
- 7 February - Frank Hancock, Wales international rugby union international (died 1943)
- 16 February - T. E. Ellis, politician (died 1899)
- 18 April - Sir Evan Davies Jones, 1st Baronet, civil engineer (died 1949)
- 4 May - Sir Samuel Thomas Evans, politician and judge (died 1918)
- 22 May - Jonathan Ceredig Davies, travel writer (died 1932)
- 17 July - Ernest Rhys, writer (died 1946)
- 11 Oct – Aneurin Williams, politician (died 1924)
- 5 December - Edward John Lewis, Wales international rugby union player (died 1925)
- 7 December - Leonard Watkins, Wales international rugby union player (died 1901)
- 25 December - John Goulstone Lewis Wales international rugby union player (died 1935)
- November - Richard Bell, politician (died 1930)

== Deaths ==
- 19 January - Charles Vachell, alderman and former mayor of Cardiff, 75
- 19 April – Christopher Bethell, Bishop of Bangor, 85
- 20 May - Thomas Penson the younger, county surveyor of Denbighshire, 69
- 21 June - John Bowen, Bishop of Sierra Leone, 43 (yellow fever)
- 8 July - John Thomas (Siôn Wyn o Eifion), poet, 78
- 10 September - Sir John Hay Williams, landowner, 65
- 24 September – Joseph Murray Ince, painter, 53
- October - Evan Jones (Ifan y Gorlan), harpist

== See also ==
- 1859 in Ireland
