= 1794 in Wales =

- Centuries: 16th; 17th; 18th; 19th; 20th
- Decades: 1770s; 1780s; 1790s; 1800s; 1810s
- See also: List of years in Wales; Timeline of Welsh history 1794 in Great Britain Scotland Elsewhere

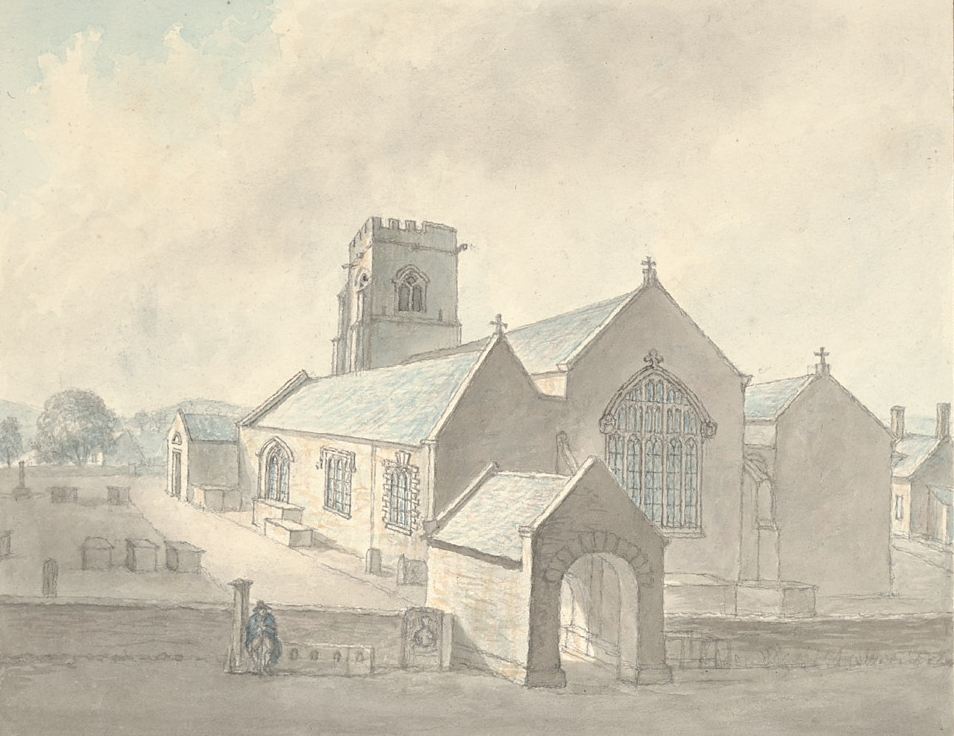

This article is about the particular significance of the year 1794 to Wales and its people.

== Incumbents ==
- Lord Lieutenant of Anglesey - Henry Paget
- Lord Lieutenant of Brecknockshire and Monmouthshire – Henry Somerset, 5th Duke of Beaufort
- Lord Lieutenant of Caernarvonshire - Thomas Bulkeley, 7th Viscount Bulkeley
- Lord Lieutenant of Cardiganshire – Wilmot Vaughan, 1st Earl of Lisburne
- Lord Lieutenant of Carmarthenshire – John Vaughan
- Lord Lieutenant of Denbighshire - Richard Myddelton
- Lord Lieutenant of Flintshire - Sir Roger Mostyn, 5th Baronet
- Lord Lieutenant of Glamorgan – John Stuart, Lord Mount Stuart (until 22 January); John Stuart, 1st Marquess of Bute (from 24 December)
- Lord Lieutenant of Merionethshire - Sir Watkin Williams-Wynn, 5th Baronet
- Lord Lieutenant of Montgomeryshire – George Herbert, 2nd Earl of Powis
- Lord Lieutenant of Pembrokeshire – Richard Philipps, 1st Baron Milford
- Lord Lieutenant of Radnorshire – Thomas Harley
- Bishop of Bangor – John Warren
- Bishop of Llandaff – Richard Watson
- Bishop of St Asaph – Lewis Bagot
- Bishop of St Davids – William Stuart (from 12 January)

== Events ==
- February - Mumbles Lighthouse is completed and brought into use.
- 21 April - Charles Kemble, Brecon-born brother of Sarah Siddons, makes his first appearance on the London stage as Malcolm in Macbeth.
- September - The 80th Foot, commanded by Henry Paget, begins service in Flanders.
- October - Morgan John Rhys arrives in Pennsylvania, where he founds the Welsh colony of Cambria.
- unknown dates
  - Richard Crawshay buys out Anthony Bacon to become sole proprietor of Cyfarthfa Ironworks.
  - Completion of the Pontypridd to Cardiff section of the Glamorganshire Canal.
  - Richard Hill is accused by the owners of the Glamorganshire Canal of improperly taking water from the Taff river which for his Plymouth Ironworks.

== Arts and literature ==
=== New books ===
- Iolo Morganwg - Poems Lyric and Pastoral
- Hester Thrale - British Synonymy: or an attempt at regulating the choice of words in familiar conversation
- Mary Whateley - Poems on Several Occasions
- Peter Williams - Gwreiddyn y Mater

=== Music ===
- The music of Men of Harlech is first published (without words) as Gorhoffedd Gwŷr Harlech—March of the Men of Harlech in the second edition of The Musical and Poetical Relicks of the Welsh Bards.

== Births ==
- 9 January - John Hay-Williams, baronet, landowner (d. 1859)
- 7 May - Rees Howell Gronow, memoirist (d. 1865)
- 3 November - David Thomas, industrialist (d. 1882)
- date unknown
  - Evan Davies (Eta Delta), Independent minister (d. 1855)
  - Rowland Fothergill, ironmaster (d. 1871)
  - David Hughes (Eos Iâl), poet and publisher (d. 1862)
  - Thomas Jenkyn, theologian (d. 1858)

== Deaths ==
- 22 January - John Stuart, Lord Mount Stuart, MP and heir of the Marquess of Bute, 26
- 26 January - Henry Herbert, 10th Earl of Pembroke, 59
- 27 April - William Jones, philologist, 47
- ?August - Sackville Gwynne, landowner, 43?
- 19 August - Sir Hugh Williams, 8th Baronet, soldier and politician, 76
- September (at sea) - Hon. William Paget, MP for Anglesey, 24 (old wound)
- 1 October - David William, hymn-writer, 74
