= 1855 in Wales =

- Centuries: 17th; 18th; 19th; 20th; 21st
- Decades: 1830s; 1840s; 1850s; 1860s; 1870s
- See also: List of years in Wales; Timeline of Welsh history 1855 in The United Kingdom Scotland Elsewhere

This article is about the particular significance of the year 1855 to Wales and its people.

== Incumbents ==
- Lord Lieutenant of Anglesey – Henry Paget, 2nd Marquess of Anglesey
- Lord Lieutenant of Brecknockshire – John Lloyd Vaughan Watkins
- Lord Lieutenant of Caernarvonshire – Sir Richard Williams-Bulkeley, 10th Baronet
- Lord Lieutenant of Cardiganshire – Thomas Lloyd, Coedmore
- Lord Lieutenant of Carmarthenshire – John Campbell, 1st Earl Cawdor
- Lord Lieutenant of Denbighshire – Robert Myddelton Biddulph
- Lord Lieutenant of Flintshire – Sir Stephen Glynne, 9th Baronet
- Lord Lieutenant of Glamorgan – Christopher Rice Mansel Talbot
- Lord Lieutenant of Merionethshire – Robert Davies Pryce
- Lord Lieutenant of Monmouthshire – Capel Hanbury Leigh
- Lord Lieutenant of Montgomeryshire – Charles Hanbury-Tracy, 1st Baron Sudeley
- Lord Lieutenant of Pembrokeshire – Sir John Owen, 1st Baronet
- Lord Lieutenant of Radnorshire – John Walsh, 1st Baron Ormathwaite
- Bishop of Bangor – Christopher Bethell
- Bishop of Llandaff – Alfred Ollivant
- Bishop of St Asaph – Thomas Vowler Short
- Bishop of St Davids – Connop Thirlwall

== Events ==
- 25 February – The steamship Morna is wrecked off North Bishop Rock, with the loss of 21 lives.
- 30 March – The Severn ferry from Chepstow sinks, and seven people drown.
- Construction of the first section of the Llanidloes and Newtown Railway begins.

== Arts and literature ==
=== New books ===
- John Jones (Talhaiarn) – Gwaith Talhaiarn, vol. 1
- William Rees (Gwilym Hiraethog) – Gweithiau Barddonol Gwilym Hiraethog
- William Williams (Creuddynfab) – Y Barddoniadur

=== Music ===
- Death of James Green of Bron y Garth, last of the traditional crwth players.

== Births ==
- 11 February – Samuel Goldsworthy, Wales international rugby player (died 1889)
- 9 April – Jeremiah Jones, poet (died 1902)
- 16 August – William David Phillips, Wales international rugby player (died 1918)
- 11 December – David Thomas Ffrangcon Davies, singer (died 1918)

== Deaths ==
- 21 January – Evan Evans (Ieuan Glan Geirionydd), poet, 59
- 22 January – Sir Thomas Frankland Lewis, politician, 74
- 9 February – William Chambers, industrialist, 81
- 10 February – John Henry Vivian, industrialist, 69
- 28 June – FitzRoy Somerset, 1st Baron Raglan, 66
- probable
  - Richard Jones, printer and publisher, ?68
  - William Edwards (Gwilym Callestr), poet

== See also ==
- 1855 in Ireland
