= 1851 in Wales =

- Centuries: 17th; 18th; 19th; 20th; 21st
- Decades: 1830s; 1840s; 1850s; 1860s; 1870s
- See also: List of years in Wales; Timeline of Welsh history 1851 in The United Kingdom Scotland Elsewhere

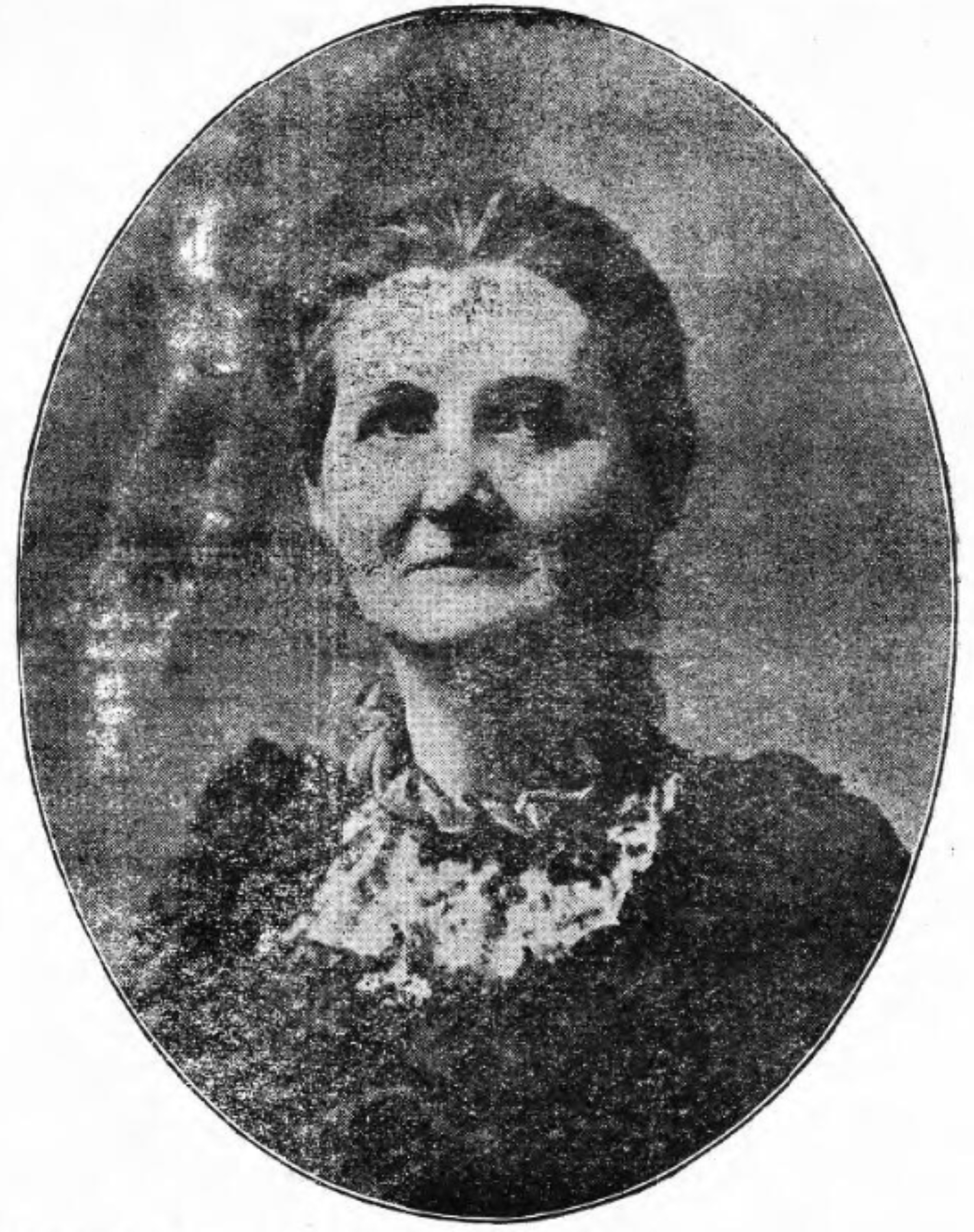
A historical black-and-white portrait photograph of Elizabeth Phillips Hughes in an oval frame

This article is about the particular significance of the year 1851 to Wales and its people.

== Incumbents ==
- Lord Lieutenant of Anglesey – Henry Paget, 1st Marquess of Anglesey
- Lord Lieutenant of Brecknockshire – John Lloyd Vaughan Watkins
- Lord Lieutenant of Caernarvonshire – Peter Drummond-Burrell, 22nd Baron Willoughby de Eresby (until 7 March); Sir Richard Williams-Bulkeley, 10th Baronet (from 7 March)
- Lord Lieutenant of Cardiganshire – William Edward Powell
- Lord Lieutenant of Carmarthenshire – George Rice, 3rd Baron Dynevor
- Lord Lieutenant of Denbighshire – Robert Myddelton Biddulph
- Lord Lieutenant of Flintshire – Sir Stephen Glynne, 9th Baronet
- Lord Lieutenant of Glamorgan – Christopher Rice Mansel Talbot (from 4 May)
- Lord Lieutenant of Merionethshire – Edward Lloyd-Mostyn, 2nd Baron Mostyn
- Lord Lieutenant of Monmouthshire – Capel Hanbury Leigh
- Lord Lieutenant of Montgomeryshire – Charles Hanbury-Tracy, 1st Baron Sudeley
- Lord Lieutenant of Pembrokeshire – Sir John Owen, 1st Baronet
- Lord Lieutenant of Radnorshire – John Walsh, 1st Baron Ormathwaite
- Bishop of Bangor – Christopher Bethell
- Bishop of Llandaff – Alfred Ollivant
- Bishop of St Asaph – Thomas Vowler Short
- Bishop of St Davids – Connop Thirlwall

== Events ==
- May
  - David Davies (Llandinam) marries Margaret Jones of Llanfair Caereinion.
- 24 September – Vale of Neath Railway opens from Neath to Aberdare.
- 27 August – William Bulkeley Hughes hosts a banquet at Bangor for Robert Stephenson.
  - Richard Fothergill III is prosecuted for running a "truck shop" at Aberdare.

== Arts and literature ==
=== New books ===
- John Blackwell (Alun) – Ceinion Alun (posthumously published)
- Richard Williams Morgan – A Tragedy of Powys Castle

=== Music ===
- Thomas Jones (Gogrynwr) – Gweddi Habacuc (cantata)
- John Ambrose Lloyd – Teyrnasoedd y Ddaear (anthem)
- John Owen (Owain Alaw)
  - Deborah a Barac (anthem)
  - Gweddi Habacuc (cantata)

== Births ==
- 8 February – Sir Marteine Lloyd, 2nd Baronet (d. 1933)
- 10 March – William Haggar, pioneer of the film industry (d. 1925)
- 24 March – Robert Ambrose Jones (Emrys ap Iwan) (d. 1906)
- 15 June – Ernest Howard Griffiths, physicist (d. 1932)
- 12 July – Elizabeth Phillips Hughes, promoter of women's education (died 1925)
- 27 December – Percy Gilchrist, industrialist

== Deaths ==
- 1 January – George Insole, English-born coal shipper, 60
- 6 April – William Morgan Kinsey, travel writer, 62?
- 8 April – John Parry (Bardd Alaw), harpist and composer, 75
- 30 June
  - Thomas Phillips, founder of Llandovery College, 80
  - William Saunders, Welsh-language poet, 45
- 17 July – Aneurin Owen, historian, 58
- 13 August – Benjamin Gibson, classical scholar, younger brother of John Gibson, 40
- 22 November – Thomas Morgan, navy chaplain, 81

== See also ==
- 1851 in Ireland
