= 1852 in Wales =

- Centuries: 17th; 18th; 19th; 20th; 21st
- Decades: 1830s; 1840s; 1850s; 1860s; 1870s
- See also: List of years in Wales; Timeline of Welsh history 1852 in The United Kingdom Scotland Elsewhere

This article is about the particular significance of the year 1852 to Wales and its people.

== Incumbents ==
- Lord Lieutenant of Anglesey – Henry Paget, 1st Marquess of Anglesey
- Lord Lieutenant of Brecknockshire – John Lloyd Vaughan Watkins
- Lord Lieutenant of Caernarvonshire – Sir Richard Williams-Bulkeley, 10th Baronet
- Lord Lieutenant of Cardiganshire – William Edward Powell
- Lord Lieutenant of Carmarthenshire – George Rice, 3rd Baron Dynevor (until 9 April); John Campbell, 1st Earl Cawdor (from 4 May)
- Lord Lieutenant of Denbighshire – Robert Myddelton Biddulph
- Lord Lieutenant of Flintshire – Sir Stephen Glynne, 9th Baronet
- Lord Lieutenant of Glamorgan – Christopher Rice Mansel Talbot (from 4 May)
- Lord Lieutenant of Merionethshire – Edward Lloyd-Mostyn, 2nd Baron Mostyn
- Lord Lieutenant of Monmouthshire – Capel Hanbury Leigh
- Lord Lieutenant of Montgomeryshire – Charles Hanbury-Tracy, 1st Baron Sudeley
- Lord Lieutenant of Pembrokeshire – Sir John Owen, 1st Baronet
- Lord Lieutenant of Radnorshire – John Walsh, 1st Baron Ormathwaite
- Bishop of Bangor – Christopher Bethell
- Bishop of Llandaff – Alfred Ollivant
- Bishop of St Asaph – Thomas Vowler Short
- Bishop of St Davids – Connop Thirlwall

== Events ==
- 24 February – The Times reports that Robert Stephenson has approved Isambard Kingdom Brunel's design for a railway bridge at Chepstow.
- 10 May – 27 men are killed by quicksand at Gwendraeth Colliery, Pontyberem.
- 14 May – 64 men are killed by underground explosion at Middle Duffryn Colliery, Aberdare.
- August – Halkyn-born Mormon missionary Dan Jones begins his second (4-year) mission for the Church of Jesus Christ of Latter-day Saints in Wales. He also oversees translation of the Book of Mormon into the Welsh language.
- 14 September – Three-decker sailing first-rate ship of the line HMS Duke of Wellington, converted on the stocks to screw propulsion, is launched at Pembroke Dock.
- 4 November – In the United Kingdom general election:
  - Walter Coffin becomes the first Nonconformist MP elected in Wales.
  - Henry Vivian becomes MP for Truro.
  - Crawshay Bailey becomes MP for Monmouth Boroughs.
- December – In the by-election caused by the death of John Josiah Guest, Henry Austin Bruce is elected MP for Merthyr Tydfil.
- date unknown
  - St David's College, Lampeter, becomes the first institution in Wales to award degrees.
  - Construction of the first Merthyr Synagogue begins.
  - Richard Muspratt sets up an alkali manufacturing factory in Flint.
  - The Alliance Insurance Company is set up in Wrexham, advertising itself as the only Welsh insurance company.

== Arts and literature ==
=== New books ===
- Aneurin Jones – Tafol y Beirdd
- William Rees (Gwilym Hiraethog) – Aelwyd F'Ewythr Robert
- John Williams (Glanmor) – Awstralia a'r Cloddfeydd Aur
- Robert Williams – Enwogion Cymru: A Biographical Dictionary of Eminent Welshmen, from the Earliest Times

=== Music ===
- J. Ambrose Lloyd – Teyrnasoedd y Ddaear
- Edward Stephen (Tanymarian) – Ystorm Tiberias (oratorio)
- Thomas Williams (Hafrenydd) – Ceinion Cerddoriaeth

== Births ==
- 20 March – John Gwenogvryn Evans, palaeographer (died 1930)
- 26 April – William Eilir Evans, journalist (died 1910)
- 28 April – Sir Francis Edwards, 1st Baronet, Liberal politician (died 1927)
- 11 May — Sir David Saunders Davies, MP (died 1934)
- 25 November – Sir Vincent Evans, Eisteddfod supporter (died 1934)
- December – Alice Gray Jones (Ceridwen Peris), writer (died 1943)
- date unknown
  - Ann Harriet Hughes (Gwyneth Vaughan), novelist (died 1910)
  - David Brynmor Jones, barrister, historian and Liberal MP (died 1921)

== Deaths ==
- 23 February – Evan Jones (Ieuan Gwynedd), minister and journalist, 31
- 9 April – George Rice, 3rd Baron Dynevor, Lord Lieutenant of Carmarthenshire, 86
- 2 May – John Jones (Ioan Tegid), poet, 60
- 20 May – Robert Williamson ("Bardd Du Môn"), poet, 45?
- 17 June – John Page (Ioan Glan Dyfrdwy), poet, 21/22
- 26 November – John Josiah Guest, engineer, entrepreneur and politician, 77
- 18 December – Evan Owen Allen, writer, 47

== See also ==
- 1852 in Ireland
