= 1860s in Wales =

- 1850s | 1870s | Other years in Wales
- Other events of the decade

This article is about the particular significance of the decade 1860–1869 to Wales and its people.

== Events ==
- 1860
- 1861
- 1862
- 1863
- 1864
- 1865
- 1866
- 1867
- 1868
- 1869

== Arts and literature ==
=== Awards ===
National Eisteddfod of Wales

- 1861 - Aberdare
- 1862 - Caernarfon
- 1863 - Swansea
- 1864 - Llandudno
- 1865 - Aberystwyth
- 1866 - Chester
- 1867 - Carmarthen - A crown is presented for the first time
- 1868 - Ruthin - The Eisteddfod Council is disbanded
- 1869 - Holywell

=== New books ===
- R. D. Blackmore - Clara Vaughan (1864)
- George Borrow - Wild Wales (1862)
- Rhoda Broughton - Cometh Up as a Flower (1867)
- Richard Davies (Mynyddog) - Caneuon Mynyddog (1866)
- Huw Derfel - Llawlyfr Carnedd Llywelyn (1864)
- Robert Jones Derfel - Traethodau ac Areithiau (1864)
- John Ceiriog Hughes
  - Oriau'r Hwyr (1860)
  - Oriau'r Bore (1862)
  - Cant o Ganeuon (1863)
  - Y Bardd a'r Cerddor (1865)
  - Oriau eraill (1868)
- David Watkin Jones (Dafydd Morgannwg) - Yr Ysgol Farddol (1869)
- William Rees (Gwilym Hiraethog) - Emmanuel (1861)
- William Thomas (Islwyn) - Caniadau (1867)
- Robert Williams (Trebor Mai)
  - Fy Noswyl (1861)
  - Geninen (1869)
- Alfred Russel Wallace
  - The Origin of Human Races and the Antiquity of Man Deduced from the Theory of 'Natural Selection (1864)
  - The Malay Archipelago (1867)

=== Music ===
- William Griffiths (Ifander) - Gwarchae Harlech (cantata) (1864)
- Hugh Jerman - Deus Misereatur (1861)
- Henry Brinley Richards - "God Bless the Prince of Wales" (1863)
- John Thomas (Pencerdd Gwalia)
  - Llewelyn (cantata) (1863)
  - The Bride of Neath Valley (cantata) (1866)

== Sport ==
- 1860 - The first bowls club in Wales is founded at Abergavenny.
