= 1862 in Wales =

- Centuries: 17th; 18th; 19th; 20th; 21st
- Decades: 1840s; 1850s; 1860s; 1870s; 1880s
- See also: List of years in Wales; Timeline of Welsh history 1862 in The United Kingdom Scotland Elsewhere

This article is about the particular significance of the year 1862 to Wales and its people.

== Incumbents ==
- Lord Lieutenant of Anglesey – Henry Paget, 2nd Marquess of Anglesey
- Lord Lieutenant of Brecknockshire – John Lloyd Vaughan Watkins
- Lord Lieutenant of Caernarvonshire – Sir Richard Williams-Bulkeley, 10th Baronet
- Lord Lieutenant of Cardiganshire – Edward Pryse
- Lord Lieutenant of Carmarthenshire – John Campbell, 2nd Earl Cawdor
- Lord Lieutenant of Denbighshire – Robert Myddelton Biddulph
- Lord Lieutenant of Flintshire – Sir Stephen Glynne, 9th Baronet
- Lord Lieutenant of Glamorgan – Christopher Rice Mansel Talbot
- Lord Lieutenant of Merionethshire – Edward Lloyd-Mostyn, 2nd Baron Mostyn
- Lord Lieutenant of Monmouthshire – Benjamin Hall, 1st Baron Llanover
- Lord Lieutenant of Montgomeryshire – Thomas Hanbury-Tracy, 2nd Baron Sudeley
- Lord Lieutenant of Pembrokeshire – William Edwardes, 3rd Baron Kensington
- Lord Lieutenant of Radnorshire – John Walsh, 1st Baron Ormathwaite
- Bishop of Bangor – James Colquhoun Campbell
- Bishop of Llandaff – Alfred Ollivant
- Bishop of St Asaph – Thomas Vowler Short
- Bishop of St Davids – Connop Thirlwall

== Events ==
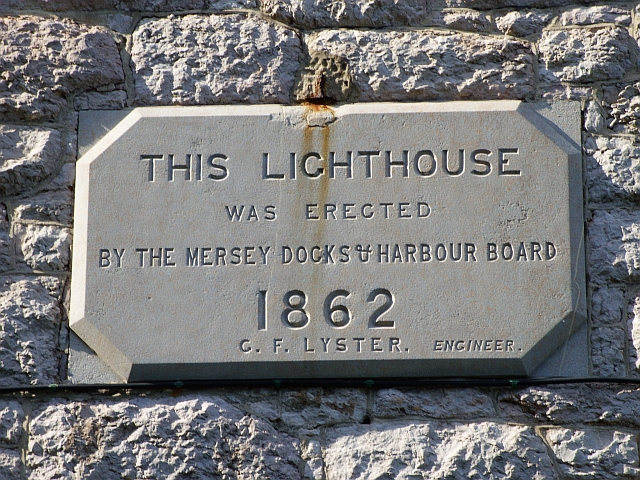
Plaque at Llandudno Lighthouse, erected 1862

- 1 January – South Wales Railway leased to Great Western Railway prior to merger.
- 19 February – Gethin Pit disaster, Abercanaid: the first of two firedamp explosions at this colliery near Merthyr Tydfil kills 47 men and boys.
- 5 May – Henry Austin Bruce, 1st Baron Aberdare, makes an important speech on the subject of education in Wales. He is later appointed vice-president of the Committee of Council on Education.
- 2 June – Llangollen is linked to the rail network for the first time.
- 4 July – Sarah Edith Wynne, noted soprano, makes her London début.
- c. August – First train through the Brecon and Merthyr Tydfil Junction Railway's Torpantau Tunnel.
- 7 August – Ferry from Porthmadog to Talsarnau sinks with the loss of 8 lives.
- 28 October – The incomplete Moel Famau Jubilee Tower collapses in a storm.
- 1 December – Great Orme's Head lighthouse at Llandudno, erected by the Mersey Docks and Harbour Board, is first illuminated.
- Guillermo Rawson, Interior Minister of Argentina, meets Love Jones-Parry and Lewis Jones to discuss the Welsh colonisation of Patagonia.
- The Clogau mine begins producing gold.
- Snowdon Mill, a steam-powered flour mill, is opened at Porthmadog.

== Arts and literature ==
- "Religion", by Joseph Edwards, and "The Tinted Venus" by John Gibson are among sculptures shown at the Great Exhibition.

=== Awards ===
- National Eisteddfod of Wales is held at Caernarfon. The chair is won by Rowland Williams (Hwfa Môn).

=== New books ===
==== English language ====
- George Borrow – Wild Wales
- Rees Howell Gronow – Reminiscences of Captain Gronow
- Jane Williams (Ysgafell) – Celtic Fables, Fairy Tales and Legends versified

==== Welsh language ====
- John Ceiriog Hughes – Oriau'r Bore

=== Music ===
- Henry Brinley Richards – "God Bless the Prince of Wales"
- Ebenezer Thomas (Eben Fardd) – Hymnau

== Sport ==
- Cricket
  - 21 July – South Wales Cricket Club defeat Surrey at The Oval.
  - 24 July – South Wales Cricket Club defeat MCC at Lord's.

== Births ==
- 5 January – John Fisher, Celtic scholar (d. 1930)
- 16 January – Leifchild Jones, 1st Baron Rhayader, politician (d. 1939)
- 17 January – Buckley Roderick, Wales international rugby player (d. 1908)
- 23 January – Evan Richards, Wales international rugby player (d. 1931)
- 1 February – Thomas Pryce-Jenkins, Wales international rugby player (d. 1922)
- 16 February
  - Llewellyn John Montfort Bebb, academic (d. 1915)
  - Philip Tanner, folk singer (d. 1950)
- 22 March – Edward Treharne, Wales international rugby player (d. 1904)
- 11 April – Charles Evans Hughes, American politician of Welsh parentage (d. 1948)
- 27 April – Sir Hugh Vincent, solicitor and Wales international rugby player (d. 1931)
- 28 April – William Norton, Wales international rugby player (d. 1898)
- 17 May – Sir William Rice Edwards, surgeon (d. 1923)
- 5 August - Robert Mills-Roberts, footballer (d. 1935)
- 16 September – Thomas Baker Jones, Wales international rugby player (d. 1959)
- 27 October – Sir Hugh Evan-Thomas, admiral (d. 1928)
- 16 November – Sir David Rocyn-Jones, medical practitioner and President of the WRU (d. 1953)
- 7 December – Humphrey Jones, footballer (d. 1946)
- 9 December – John John Evans, journalist (d. 1942)
- date unknown
  - John Daniel Evans, Patagonia settler (died 1943)
  - Seth Powell, footballer (d. 1945)

== Deaths ==
- 3 January – Dan Jones, Mormon missionary, 51
- 8 February - Hans Busk, poet, 89
- 25 March – Timothy Davies, clergyman
- 1 May – Frederick Richard West, politician, 62/63
- 28 May – James Henry Cotton, Dean of Bangor, 82
- 2 August – Anthony Hill, industrialist, 78
- 27 August – John Williams (Ab Ithel), antiquary, 51
- 9 December – Edward Hughes (Eos Maldwyn), harpist, age unknown (tuberculosis)
- 31 December – Daniel Jones, Baptist minister, 74
- date unknown – Robert Edwards, hymn writer, 66?

== See also ==
- 1862 in Ireland
