= 1870s in Wales =

- 1860s | 1880s | Other years in Wales
- Other events of the decade

This article is about the particular significance of the decade 1870–1879 to Wales and its people.

== Incumbents ==
- Archdruid of the National Eisteddfod of Wales – Clwydfardd (from 1876)

== Events ==
- 1870
- 1871
- 1872
- 1873
- 1874
- 1875
- 1876
- 1877
- 1878
- 1879

== Arts and literature ==
=== Awards ===
National Eisteddfod of Wales – no National Eisteddfod officially took place during this decade. 1870 – William Thomas (Islwyn) wins a bardic chair at Rhyl.

1872 – Islwyn wins a bardic chair at Holyhead.
1874 – Islwyn wins a bardic chair at Caerphilly.
1877 – Islwyn wins a bardic chair at Treherbert.

=== New books ===
- R. D. Blackmore – The Maid of Sker (1872)
- Rhoda Broughton – Nancy (1873)
- Richard Davies (Mynyddog)
  - Yr Ail Gynnig (1870)
  - Y Trydydd Cynnig (1877)
- Robert Elis (Cynddelw) – Manion Hynafiaethol (1873)
- Beriah Gwynfe Evans – Owain Glyndwr (play) (1879)
- Daniel Silvan Evans (editor) – Celtic Remains (1878)
- John Ceiriog Hughes – Oriau'r Haf (1870)
- William Rees (Gwilym Hiraethog)
  - Helyntion Bywyd Hen Deiliwr (1877)
  - Llythyrau 'Rhen Ffarmwr (1878)
- Thomas Thomas (minister) – Hynodion Hen Bregethwyr Cymru (1872)

=== Music ===
- 1873
  - Henry Brinley Richards – Songs of Wales
