= William Spurrell =

Welsh printer (1813–1889)

William Spurrell (30 July 1813 – 22 April 1889) was a Welsh printer and publisher, whose name is associated with one of the most popular Welsh language dictionaries, the Spurrell's Welsh Dictionary English-Welsh.

== Family ==
William Spurrell was born 13 Quay Street, Carmarthen, and was the third son of Richard Spurrell, who was clerk to the county magistrates and held other public offices in Carmarthen, and Elizabeth Margaretta Thomas. William's grandfather John Spurrell had been an auctioneer in Bath and was the first member of the family to move to Wales.

In 1846, William Spurrell married Sarah Walter. They had eleven children, including:

- William George Spurrell (1856–1949), Vicar of Carew, Pembrokeshire, and Canon of St. David's Cathedral
- Walter Spurrell JP (1858–1934), a printer and publisher (having inherited his father's business, W. Spurrell & Son) and mayor of Carmarthen
- Richard Spurrell (1864–1947), Rector of Rousdon, Devon
- Charles Spurrell (1866–1949), medical superintendent at Poplar and Stepney Sick Asylum

Spurrell attended Queen Elizabeth Grammar School, Carmarthen, until age 16.

== Career as printer and author ==
In November 1830, Spurrell began an apprenticeship with John Pritchard Davies, printer, of King Street, Carmarthen, where he remained for five years. In 1835, he went to London, where he remained until the death of his mother in 1839. In 1840, having returned to Carmarthen, he established a publishing business in the town. This grew to become one of the most successful presses in Wales.

William Spurrell wrote a history of Carmarthen town and compiled and published a Welsh-English dictionary (first published 1848) and an English-Welsh dictionary (first published 1850). An updated version of the Spurrell Dictionary is still published by HarperCollins as the Collins Spurrell Welsh Dictionary (ISBN 9780008194826).

Spurrell was a Conservative in politics, and from 1857 until 1885, was the proprietor and publisher of Yr Haul. Established at Llandovery by David Owen (Brutus), this was one of the few Welsh language periodicals to adopt an Anglican and Conservative perspective at a time when nonconformism and the Liberal Party were becoming increasingly prevalent in Welsh society.

Before establishing the University of Wales Press, Spurrell was printing and publishing standard books on behalf of the University of Wales and also on behalf of the National Library of Wales for a period.

Spurrell died on 22 April 1889, aged 75. He was buried in the cemetery at St David's Church, Carmarthen.
