= William Price (industrialist) =

Sir William Price (c. 1860 – 16 April 1938), born in Wales, was a farmer and industrialist, and a director of United Dairies Ltd. He was knighted in 1922, on the nomination of David Lloyd George, by King George V. A fluent speaker of Welsh, he was nominated for "services rendered to his country during the War and afterwards, and for services rendered to Welsh interests in London". He had several children.
