= John Davies (Unitarian minister, born 1795) =

Welsh Unitarian minister and schoolmaster

John Davies (1795 – 19 April 1858) was a Welsh Unitarian minister, and schoolmaster. His father was David Davies, minister of Llanybri. John Davies received some early education at home, his father being a notable Classical and Hebrew scholar. He later attended a local grammar school, and Carmarthen Academy (1815–19), where his father had taught. Having become a member of the Unitarian Church whilst at college, he began preaching at the local chapel. Later, following the retirement of David Davis of Castell Hywel in 1820, he took charge of the churches of Alltyblaca, Bwlchyfadfa, Llwyn-rhyd-Owen, and Pen-rhiw. He also worked as an assistant at the grammar school run by Davis, before starting schools of his own at Gelli-gron, Blaenbydernyn (Pencarreg, Carmarthenshire), Tyssul Castle, and Tre-fach, and, in 1830, an academy at Adpar, Newcastle Emlyn. His pupils included the antiquary Thomas Stephens.

He died in 1858 and was buried in the graveyard of the old chapel at Llwyn-rhyd-Owen.
