= Jonathan Ceredig Davies =

Jonathan Ceredig Davies (1859 - 1932) was a Welsh traveller, and writer, from the Llangunllo area, Cardiganshire. In 1875, aged 16, he travelled to the recently formed Welsh colony in Patagonia. In 1891, he returned to Wales, where from 1892 he is known to have been responsible for editing 'Yr Athrofa'. In 1898 he left for a four year long visit to Western Australia. He was interested in studying native populations and their local customs. He made a further trip to Western Australia in 1907, and in later years visited Spain and France, but settled in Wales and devoted the remainder of his life to his studies of the country's history, folk-lore, and genealogy.

His writings include: 'Darlith ar Patagonia' (Treherbert, 1891); 'Patagonia: a Description of the Country' (Treorky, 1892); 'Adventures in the Land of Giants: a Patagonian Tale' (Lampeter, 1892); Western Australia: its History and Progress' (Nantymoel, 1902); 'Awstralia Orllewinol' (Treorchy, 1903), and 'Folk-lore of West and Mid-Wales' (Aberystwyth, 1911).
