= John Jones (literary patron) =

John Jones (31 March 1773 – 6 April 1853) was a Welsh Anglican priest, scholar and literary patron.

== Life ==
Jones was born on 31 March 1773, and was the first of thirteen children in the family. His father Thomas Jones was a businessman who established the first bank in Dolgellau, Wales. John Jones was educated in Dolgellau and at Ruthin School before studying at the University of Oxford, where he matriculated as a member of Jesus College. He obtained his BA degree in 1796 and his MA in 1800. He was ordained as an Anglican priest and served as curate in Tremeirchion between 1797 and 1799, before moving to Llanyblodwel, where he met John Jenkins (known as "Ifor Ceri") and other "literary parsons". Jones became one of their number. He provided significant financial support for fellow clergymen such as John Blackwell ("Alun"), and adjudicated at provincial eisteddfodau from 1820 onwards. His own scholarship was shown in 1834 when he published the second edition of British Antiquities Revived by Robert Vaughan, first published in 1662. He paid for the memorial to Dafydd Ionawr in the churchyard in Dolgellau, and the 1851 edition of the works of Dafydd Ionawr was dedicated to Jones.

After Llanyblodwel, Jones was a curate in Wrexham before becoming vicar of Llansilin in 1811 then vicar of Rhuddlan in 1820 – a change of parish that led to his declining appointment as secretary of the Cambrian Society for Powys. In 1828, he became rector of Llandderfel, later moving to the parish of Llanaber in 1840 where he served until his retirement in 1843, when he moved to Borthwnog. He died on 6 April 1853.
