= William Thomas (Gwilym Marles) =

Welsh minister and poet (1834–1879)

Gwilym Marles

William Thomas (1834 – 11 December 1879), better known by his bardic name of Gwilym Marles, was a Welsh minister and poet, and the great-uncle of Dylan Thomas. Dylan was given his middle name, "Marlais", in honour of William Thomas, who is also believed to have inspired the character of Rev. Eli Jenkins in the play Under Milk Wood.

== Life ==
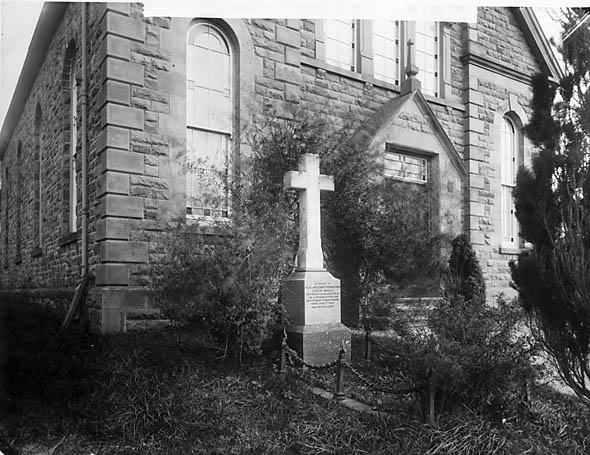
Gravestone of William Thomas at Llwynrhydowen Chapel, c.1885

Thomas was born in Brechfa near Llandysul. He had two brothers, one of whom, Evan, was the father of David John Thomas, father of Dylan. William studied at the Presbyterian College in Carmarthen, but won a scholarship which enabled him to go on to the University of Glasgow in 1856. After graduating, he became a minister at Llwynrhydowen, and for a time acted as a tutor to William Thomas (Islwyn), the poet. As well as his poems, which were published in 1859, he wrote hymns and stories, and a novel which was published in 1855 in the periodical Seren Gomer. He translated works by Alfred, Lord Tennyson, Robert Browning and Alexander Pope into the Welsh language. He married and had ten children. In 1872 the family moved back to Carmarthen.

== Influence ==
An advocate of the views of Theodore Parker, Gwilym Marles became a champion of Unitarianism, and has been called "the founder of modern Unitarianism in Wales", so much did his beliefs diverge from those of other Unitarian ministers. He opened a grammar school, and was politically active, supporting local farmers in a tithe war and campaigning on behalf of the Liberal Party in Parliamentary elections. In 1876, local landlords evicted him from his chapel as a result of these activities. The members of the congregation, who supported him, were also evicted.

== Works ==
- Prydyddiaeth (1859)
