= William Williams (Creuddynfab) =

Welsh literary critic and editor

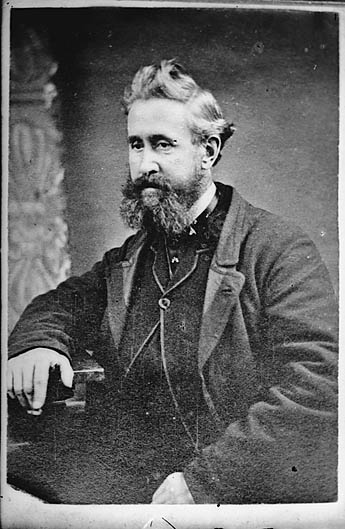
William Williams (Creuddynfab)

William Williams (1814 - 1869), also known by the bardic name Creuddynfab, was a Welsh poet and literary critic.

== Biography ==
Creuddynfab was born 20 August 1814 at Tŷ Du on the Creuddyn peninsula, and as the eldest child of stone mason Enoch Williams' large family in received little education. After working on farms from an early age, he moved to Manchester to work in a warehouse before finding employment with the Huddersfield district railway company, serving as stationmaster in Oldham and Stalybridge. During his sixteen years in Stalybridge he built a friendship with Ceiriog and became an important member of the Cymreigyddion Society in Manchester.

In 1855, he published an instructional book on poetry, Y Barddoniadur, and was an active contributor of articles to newspapers and periodicals. Around 1860, he relocated to Llandudno to take the position of the first paid secretary of the National Eisteddfod Association, but he was forced to relinquish this position within five years for health reasons. He participated in many of the key eisteddfodau, both as a competitor and an adjudicator. Creuddynfab died 26 August 1869 in Llandudno and is buried in Glanwydden cemetery.
