= Owen Wynne Jones =

Welsh poet (1818–1870)

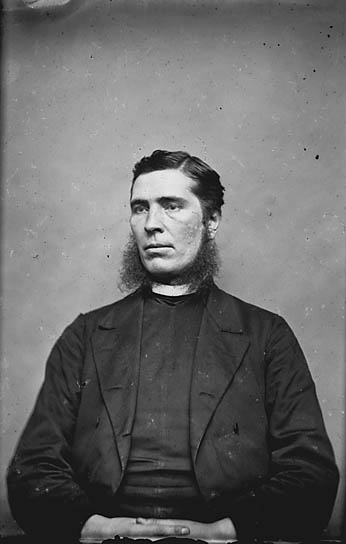
- Born: 4 March 1828; Caernarfon, Gwynedd, Wales
- Died: 4 April 1870 (aged 42); Tywyn, Gwynedd, Wales
- Writing career
- Pen name: Glasynys

Owen Wynne Jones (4 March 1828 – 4 April 1870), often known by his bardic name of Glasynys, was a Welsh clergyman, folklorist, poet, novelist and short-story writer.

== Life ==
Owen Wynne Jones was born at a house called Ty'n-y-ffrwd, in the village of Rhostryfan, near Caernarfon. At the age of eight, he began to read Welsh literature while recovering from an injury to his leg, and at the age of ten, he was sent to work in the quarry, but returned to school in the village of Y Fron, near Caernarfon, at the age of seventeen, and later began work as a schoolmaster in Clynnog Fawr on the Llŷn Peninsula, and in Llanfachreth, Merionethshire. He began to assist Eben Fardd in arranging local eisteddfodau.

In 1860 he was ordained as an Anglican clergyman, and worked as a deacon in Llangristiolus and Llanfaethlu on Anglesey. Then he moved to Pontlotyn in Monmouthshire, and later to Newport, where he co-edited he periodical Y Glorian with William Thomas (Islwyn). He left the periodical, moved to Porthmadog, Llŷn where he married, and settled in Tywyn, where he died at the age of forty-two.

== Work ==
Owen Wynne Jones wrote poetry, collected in Fy Oriau Hamddenol (1854), Lleucu Llwyd (1858) and Yr Wyddfa (1877), historical novels including Dafydd Llwyd, neu Dyddiau Cromwel, articles and letters which were published in Y Brython, Baner y Groes, Y Geninen and Yr Herald Gymraeg, and short stories, retelling folk tales and describing folk customs, which appeared in the anthology, Cymru Fu (1862).

== Critical reception ==
An essay, 'Welsh Fairy Tales' (1900) by John Rhys, draws freely on the work of Owen Wynne Jones, and comments on the likely extent to which he combined traditional stories from various sources with his own imaginative treatment of his material. Saunders Lewis, in his introduction to a selection of the short stories, Straeon Glasynys (1943), confirms that Owen Wynne Jones was an artist more than a critical scholar of folklore, but affirms his imaginative vision of a Welsh people united and enriched by folklore and customs. Kate Roberts considers his life and accomplishments alongside those of Richard Hughes Williams in her essay, Dau Lenor o Ochr Moeltryfan (1970), and a selection of his work is translated by Rob Mimpriss.

== Works ==
- Fy Oriau Hamddenol (1854)
- Lleucu Llwyd (1858)
- Yr Wyddfa (1877)
- Dafydd Llwyd (1857)
- Dafydd Gruffydd, pa beth wyt ti yn ei feddwl o'r Ddwy Fil a'r dydd hwnnw? (1894)

== Sources ==
- Owen Wynne Jones, Hallowe'en in the Cwm: The stories of Glasynys. Edited and translated by Rob Mimpriss. Cockatrice Books, 2017. ISBN 1912368145.
- Owen Wynne Jones, Straeon Glasynys. Edited by Saunders Lewis. Denbigh: Y Clwb Llyfrau Cymreig, 1943.
- John Rhys, 'Welsh Fairy Tales.' Y Cymmrodor. 5.1 (1882).
- Kate Roberts, Dau Lenor o Ochr Moeltryfan. Caernarfon: Llyfrgell Sir Caernarfon, 1970.
- Meic Stephens (ed), The Oxford Companion to the Literature of Wales. Oxford: Oxford University Press, 1986.
