= Ebenezer Thomas =

Welsh poet (1802–1863)

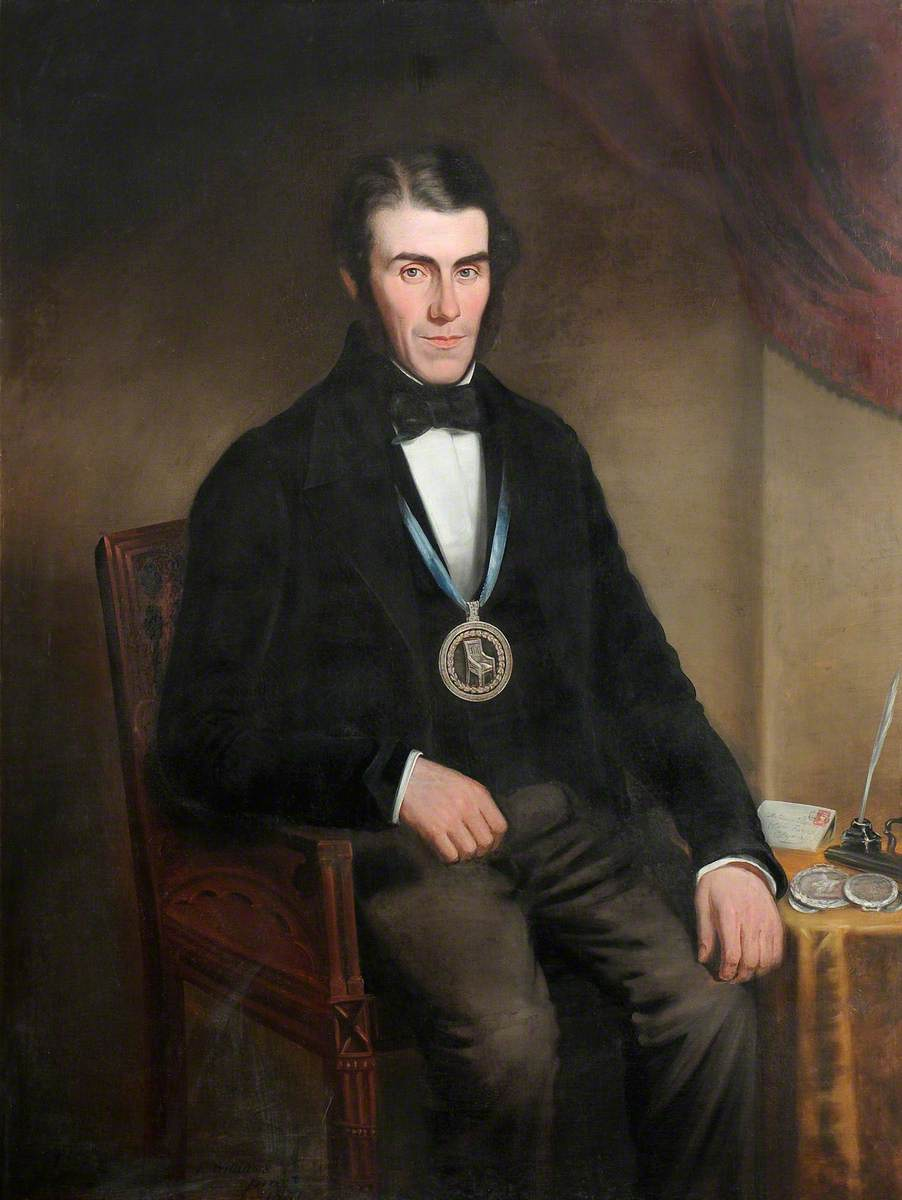
Eben Fardd

Ebenezer Thomas (August 1802 – 17 February 1863), better known to Welsh speakers by his bardic name of Eben Fardd, was a Welsh teacher and poet.

Eben Fardd was born in Llanarmon, Caernarfonshire, the son of a weaver, and educated at local schools. His elder brother, William, was a schoolmaster, and when William died, Eben Fardd took over his school at Llangybi. He won a prize for his poetry at the 1824 eisteddfod in Welshpool. He moved to Clynnog Fawr in 1827, where he lived opposite the church of St Beuno in a house now called Bod Cybi, and is buried in the churchyard. In 1830, he married Mary Williams; they had three daughters and a son. In 1840, he won another prize at the Liverpool eisteddfod, and in 1841, his first volume of poetry, Caniadau ('Songs'), was published. In 1850, he was given a grant by the Calvinistic Methodist Church to run a school on its behalf. He had gained such respect as a poet and eisteddfod competitor that he also became an adjudicator. He also wrote numerous hymns. His collected works were published in 1873 under the title Gweithiau Barddonol Eben Fardd ('Eben Fardd's Poetical Works').

His best-known hymn, Crist yn Graig Ddisigl ('Christ as an Unwavering Rock'), also known by its opening line "O! fy Iesu bendigedig" ('Oh! my blessed Jesus'), was written in response to the deaths of three of his children and his wife, all during the 1850s.
