= Thomas Lloyd, Coedmore =

Landowner and Lord Lieutenant of Cardiganshire

Thomas Lloyd (1 November 1793 – 12 July 1857), was a 19th-century landowner who served as Lord Lieutenant of Cardiganshire from 1854 until his death in 1857.

Lloyd was from Coedmore, a relatively small estate in the parish of Llangoedmor in southern Cardiganshire, Wales. He was married to Charlotte, daughter of Edward Longcroft of Llanina, at St Mary's Church, Haverfordwest, on 23 March 1819. They had four children, including Thomas Edward Lloyd, who served as Conservative MP for Cardiganshire from 1874 until 1880.

Thomas Lloyd belonged to an old-established Cardiganshire family who came into possession of Coedmore (or Coedmawr in Welsh) in the seventeenth century when a previous Thomas Lloyd married the heiress of the Lewis family who previously owned the estate.

Lloyd died at Coedmore on 12 July 1857, aged 64.

Honorary titles
Preceded by William Edward Powell	Lord Lieutenant of Cardiganshire; 1854–1857	Succeeded by Edward Pryse
