= John Ceiriog Hughes =

Welsh poet and folk-tune collector (1832–1887)

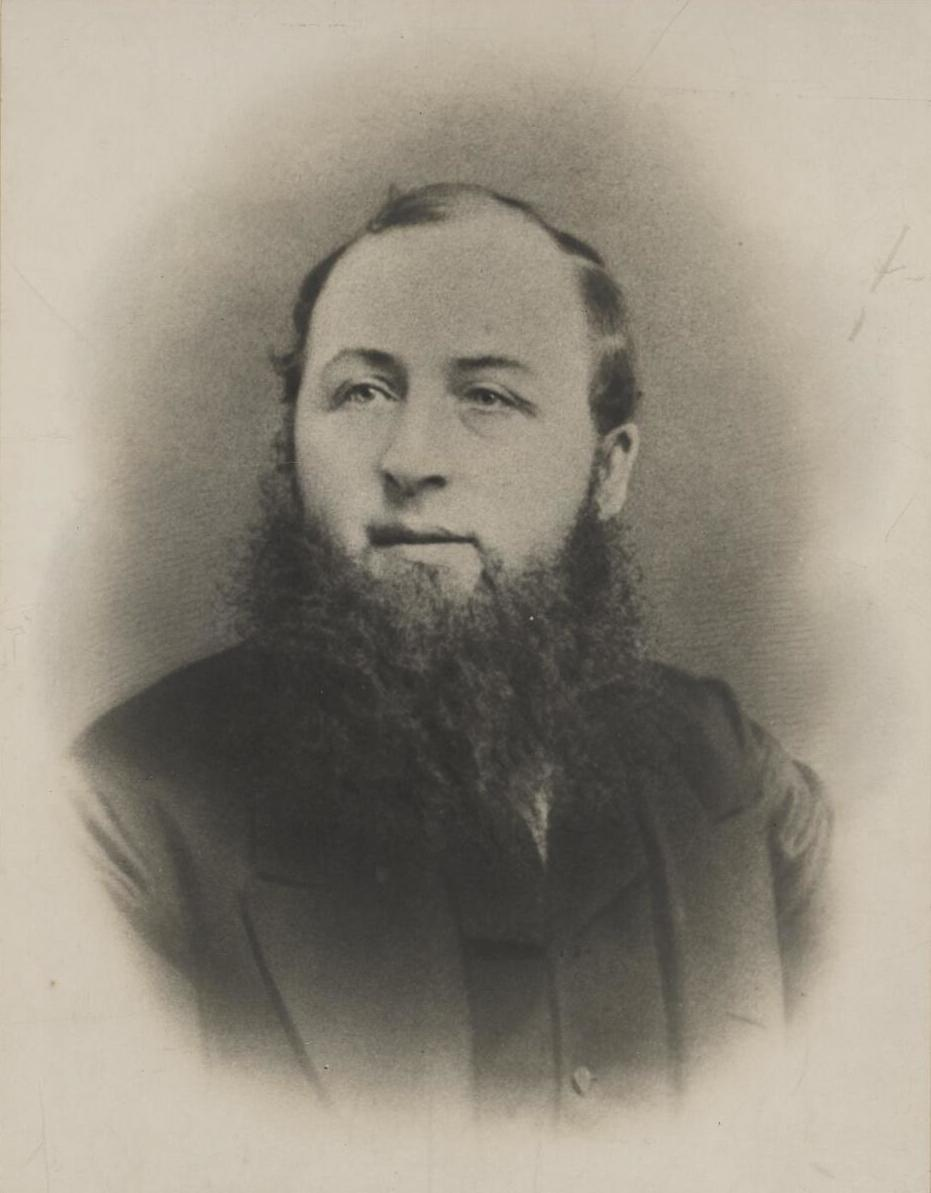
John Ceiriog Hughes

John Ceiriog Hughes (25 September 1832 – 23 April 1887) was a Welsh poet and collector of Welsh folk tunes, sometimes termed a Robert Burns of Wales. He was born at Penybryn Farm, overlooking the village of Llanarmon Dyffryn Ceiriog in the Ceiriog Valley of north-east Wales, then in Denbighshire, now part of Wrexham County Borough. One of eight children, he was a favourite of his mother, Phoebe, a midwife and herbal-medicine expert.

== Life ==
At 16, Hughes left the village for Manchester to work as a grocer. He opened his own shop in 1854. There he met and was befriended and influenced by William Williams (Creuddynfab), a station master in the Pennines, who found him a job on the railway. Williams had been appointed first secretary of the National Eisteddfod Society. Hughes decided to sell his shop and concentrate on writing poetry, but he also started to drink heavily.

Hughes returned to Wales in 1865 as station master at Llanidloes. From 1868, he was also manager of the Van Railway at Caersws railway station. In 1876, he became a Freemason, joining Sir Watkin Lodge No. 1477 at Mold, but resigning in 1879. He died in 1887 at the age of 54, leaving £96. He is buried at Llanwnnog.

== Poetry ==
Hughes made his first attempts at poetry while a pupil at Nant y Glôg School, after his father had given him a book on Welsh grammar, including a section on the sound arrangement known as cynghanedd.

Ceiriog's desire to restore simplicity of diction and emotional sincerity to Welsh poetry did for it what Wordsworth and Coleridge had done for English. He is noted for an attempt to create a new Welsh culture and raise the status of the Welsh people, after the publication of the notorious Blue Books on education in Wales. His lyric poetry rested on traditional folk song and earned national attention when he won the Llangollen Eisteddfod in 1858 with a love poem, "Myfanwy Fychan o Gastell Dinas Brân" (Little Myfanwy from Castell Dinas Brân).

Ceiriog's first poetry collection of poetry appeared in 1860 as Oriau'r Hwyr (Evening Hours). He also wrote light-hearted lyrics, which he adapted to old Welsh tunes or to original composed music. Such lyrics include "Dafydd y Garreg Wen" (David of the White Rock) and "Ar Hyd y Nos" (All Through the Night). He also wrote Welsh lyrics for the song "God Bless the Prince of Wales" and the Charles Dibdin song, "The Bells of Aberdovey", which he translated as "Clychau Aberdyfi".

Ceiriog Hughes wrote Welsh-language lyrics for "The Ash Grove" which were published in Brinley Richards's The Songs of Wales (1873). Although one source says that Ceiriog Hughes's Welsh lyrics for "Men of Harlech" were first published in 1890, remarking that the English words followed only in 1893, Ceiriog's lyrics for "Men of Harlech" are also to be found in Brinley Richards's The Songs of Wales (1873).

Like many Welsh poets, Ceiriog adopted a bardic name – "Ceiriog" from Ceiriog Valley, where he was born. The hall in his home village contains a memorial inscription to him.

== Musicologist ==
Ceiriog's fascination with Welsh folk music led him to probe its history, particularly the music of the harpists, who would often accompany songs. This led to a grand project of four planned volumes of Welsh airs, of which only the first appeared in print, in 1863: Cant O Ganeuon (A Hundred Songs).
