= Christopher Bethell =

British bishop

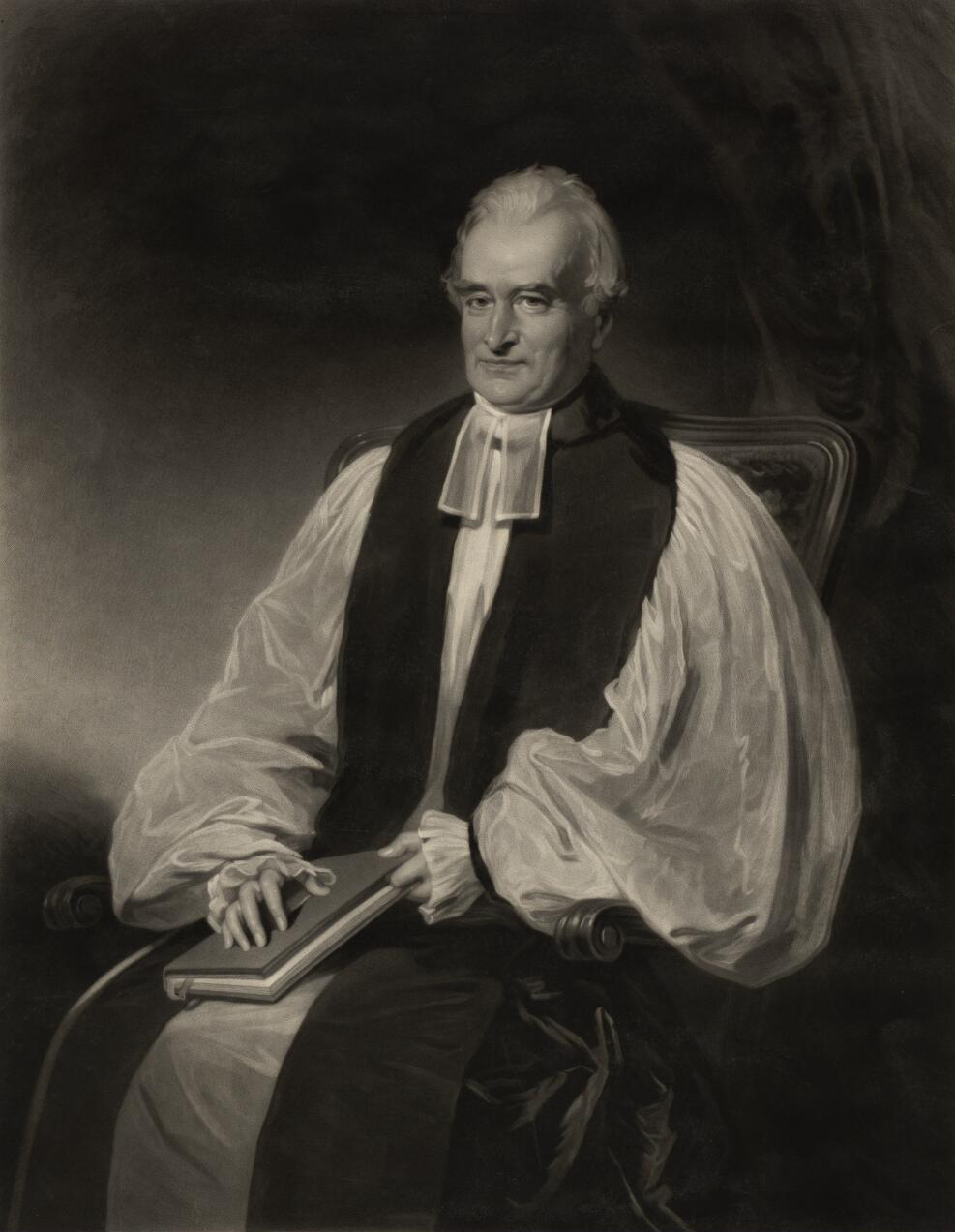
Bishop Christopher Bethell

Christopher Bethell (21 April 1773 – 19 April 1859) was Bishop of Bangor.

Bethell was the second son of the Reverend Richard Bethell, the rector of St Peter's Wallingford, Berkshire, who died 12 January 1806 having married his wife Ann in 1771 (she was the daughter of James Clitherow of Boston House, Middlesex). He was born at Isleworth, Surrey and educated at King's College, Cambridge, where he graduated BA in 1796, MA in 1799 and DD in 1817; obtained a fellowship and was second member's prizeman in 1797.

Bethell was rector of Kirby Wiske, Yorkshire, from 1808 to 1830; Dean of Chichester from 5 April 1814 and a prebendary of Exeter from 22 June 1830. Lord Liverpool nominated him as the Bishop of Gloucester on 11 March 1824. The Duke of Wellington transferred him to the more lucrative see of Exeter on 8 April 1830 and again, on 28 October in the same year, to the still more lucrative see of Bangor, which he held up to the time of his death.

Bethell was during the whole of his life identified with the High Church party. He was the author of several theological works, the principal of which is A General View of the Doctrine of Regeneration in Baptism (1821). His other works are chiefly charges and sermons. His ignorance of the Welsh language was a very great hindrance to his usefulness in the Diocese of Bangor, where 195,000 out of 200,000 people understood little more than their native tongue.

Bethell died at his episcopal residence in Bangor on 19 April 1859 and was buried in Llandegai churchyard on 27 April. At the time of his death he was the oldest of the active Welsh bishops.

Church of England titles
Preceded by Combe Miller	Dean of Chichester; 1814–1824	Succeeded by Samuel Slade
Preceded by Henry Ryder	Bishop of Gloucester; 1824–1830	Succeeded by James Henry Monk
Preceded by William Carey	Bishop of Exeter; 1830–1830	Succeeded by Henry Phillpotts
Preceded by Henry Majendie	Bishop of Bangor; 1830–1859	Succeeded by James Colquhoun Campbell
