= John Lloyd Vaughan Watkins =

Welsh politician

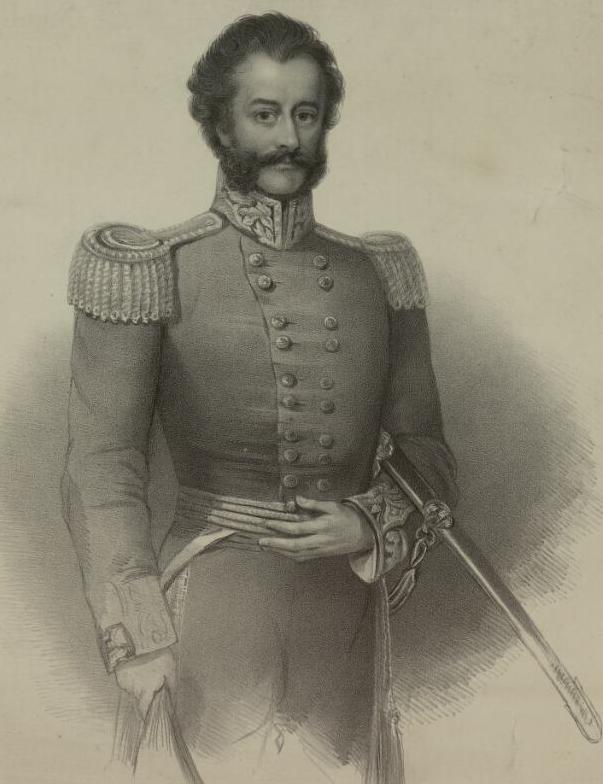
John Lloyd Vaughan Watkins

John Lloyd Vaughan Watkins (1802 – 28 September 1865) was a Welsh Liberal politician who sat in the House of Commons in three periods between 1832 and 1865.

Watkins was the son of Rev. Thomas Watkins and his wife Susanna Vaughan. His father was rector of Llandyfaelog. Watkins was educated at Harrow and at Christ Church, Oxford.

At the 1832 general election Watkins was elected Member of Parliament for Brecon. He held the seat until 1835. He was High Sheriff of Brecknockshire in 1836, and Lord Lieutenant of Brecknockshire from 1847. In 1847 he was re-elected MP for Brecon which he held until 1852. In 1854 he was re-elected again for Brecon and held the seat until his death in 1865. On 16 November 1847 he was appointed Lieutenant-Colonel Commandant of the Royal Brecknockshire Militia. He retired on 30 August 1860 and was appointed the regiment's first Honorary Colonel.

Watkins lived at Penoyre House where he had an Italianate-style villa built by Anthony Salvin between 1846 and 1848. He died at the age of 63.
