= Sir Stephen Glynne, 9th Baronet =

British politician & antiquary (1807-1874)

Sir Stephen Richard Glynne
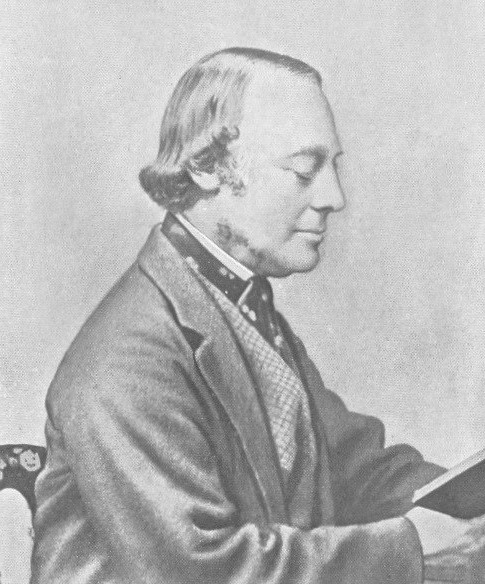
- Sir Stephen Glynne

MP for Flint Boroughs
- In office 1832–1837

MP for Flintshire
- In office 1837–1841

MP for Flintshire
- In office 1842–1847

High Sheriff of Flintshire
- In office 1831–1831

Lord Lieutenant of Flintshire
- In office 1845–1871

Personal details
- Born: 22 September 1807
- Died: 17 June 1874 (aged 66) Bishopsgate railway station, London
- Resting place: St Deiniol's Church, Hawarden, Flintshire, Wales
- Party: Conservative
- Children: 0
- Parents: Sir Stephen Glynne, 8th Baronet (father); Mary Griffin (mother)
- Relatives: Catherine Glynne (sister)
- Education: Eton College
- Alma mater: Christ Church, Oxford

Sir Stephen Richard Glynne, 9th Baronet (22 September 1807 – 17 June 1874) was a Welsh landowner and Conservative Party politician. He is principally remembered as an assiduous antiquary and student of British church architecture. He was a brother-in-law of the Liberal Prime Minister William Ewart Gladstone.

== Background and education ==
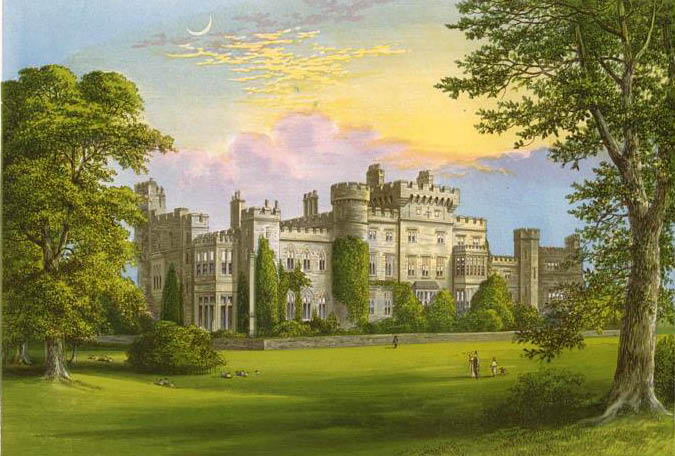
Hawarden Castle

Stephen Glynne was born on 22 September 1807, the son of Sir Stephen Glynne, 8th Baronet, and Hon. Mary née Griffin, second daughter of the 2nd Baron Braybrooke. His father died on 5 March 1815, aged 35, and so at the age of seven Stephen inherited both the baronetcy and the family estates, including Hawarden Castle in Flintshire.

He was educated at Eton, where he displayed a "singular indisposition to mix or associate even with his school fellows", although his intellect and prodigious memory were remarked on. He went on to study at Christ Church, Oxford, but was too indolent to flourish, and graduated with a third class degree in Classics.

In 1839 his sister Catherine married William Ewart Gladstone. Gladstone's father, Sir John Gladstone, helped rescue Glynne from near bankruptcy after the failure of Oak Farm brick and iron works near Stourbridge, of which Glynne was part-owner. He was able to resume occupancy of Hawarden only by selling part of the estate, and agreeing to share the castle with William and Catherine.

== Politics ==
Glynne served as Member of Parliament for Flint Boroughs from 1832 to 1837, and for Flintshire from 1837 to 1841 and 1842 to 1847. He was also High Sheriff of Flintshire in 1831, and Lord Lieutenant of Flintshire from 1845 to 1871. He was first elected as a Whig. He later sat in the Conservative interest, and, although he remained on excellent terms with Gladstone throughout his life, he shared few of Gladstone's Liberal ideals. He was an extremely shy individual who found public speaking an ordeal, and he never spoke in Parliament.

During the 1841 election campaign, Glynne found himself obliged to start libel proceedings against the Chester Chronicle for having published allegations of homosexuality against him. The newspaper was eventually forced to offer an apology.

William Gladstone frequently consulted Glynne on ecclesiastical matters, including, for example the appointment of a Welsh-speaking bishop, Joshua Hughes, to the diocese of St Asaph in 1870. Gladstone later wrote that Glynne's memory "was on the whole decidedly the most remarkable known to me of the generation and country".

== Antiquarianism ==
Glynne's real interests were not in politics, but in music and, more particularly, in church architecture. He was a committee member, later an honorary secretary, and eventually a vice-president of the Ecclesiological Society; and he helped edit one of the society's tracts, the Hand-Book of English Ecclesiology, published in 1847. He served as first President (1847–1849) of the Cambrian Archaeological Association; and as chairman (1852–1874) of the Architectural Section of the Archaeological Institute, afterwards the Royal Archaeological Institute. His remarkable memory in architectural and antiquarian matters was often the subject of comment. Archdeacon D. R. Thomas wrote: "Those who had the pleasure of his acquaintance will remember how complete and accurate were the details that he could so readily call to mind, and that an extraordinary memory underlay his quiet and unassuming manner."

In the course of his life Glynne probably visited over 5500 churches (the precise figure is debated), making detailed notes on their architectural details and fittings: this amounted to over half the surviving medieval churches in England, and well over half in Wales. He spent several months of each year on this activity, travelling by rail, horse-drawn transport, boat and on foot, and staying at hotels, inns and guest houses. In keeping with the principles of the Ecclesiological Society and the Oxford Movement, he was a devotee of the Gothic style of architecture, and was damning of 18th-century classicism, and of fittings such as box pews and galleries. His manuscript notes, dating from 1824 until a few days before his death, cover churches in England, Wales and the Channel Islands, and a few in Scotland and Ireland. Prior to 1840, they are generally undated: from that point onwards, he usually dated each visit precisely. He kept up to date with current trends in ecclesiology: thus, he used the stylistic classifications devised by Thomas Rickman (Norman, Early English, Decorated and Perpendicular) until about 1842; then switched to the Ecclesiological Society's preferred terms (First Pointed, Middle Pointed, and Third Pointed) until 1851; but reverted to Rickman's terminology from 1852. His notes are greatly valued by architectural historians, as they frequently provide a brief but informed record of the buildings as they were before Victorian restorations and re-orderings. Glynne often revisited the churches on two or three occasions at several years remove, and so the notes also provide a record of changes over time. Lawrence Butler considers that "in some ways he was the precursor of the Royal Commission on Historical Monuments in terms of ordering his descriptions".

Glynne also toured widely in Europe and Turkey, keeping detailed diaries, but here he showed considerably less insight, and his notes are considered to be of far less interest than his British material.

== Death ==
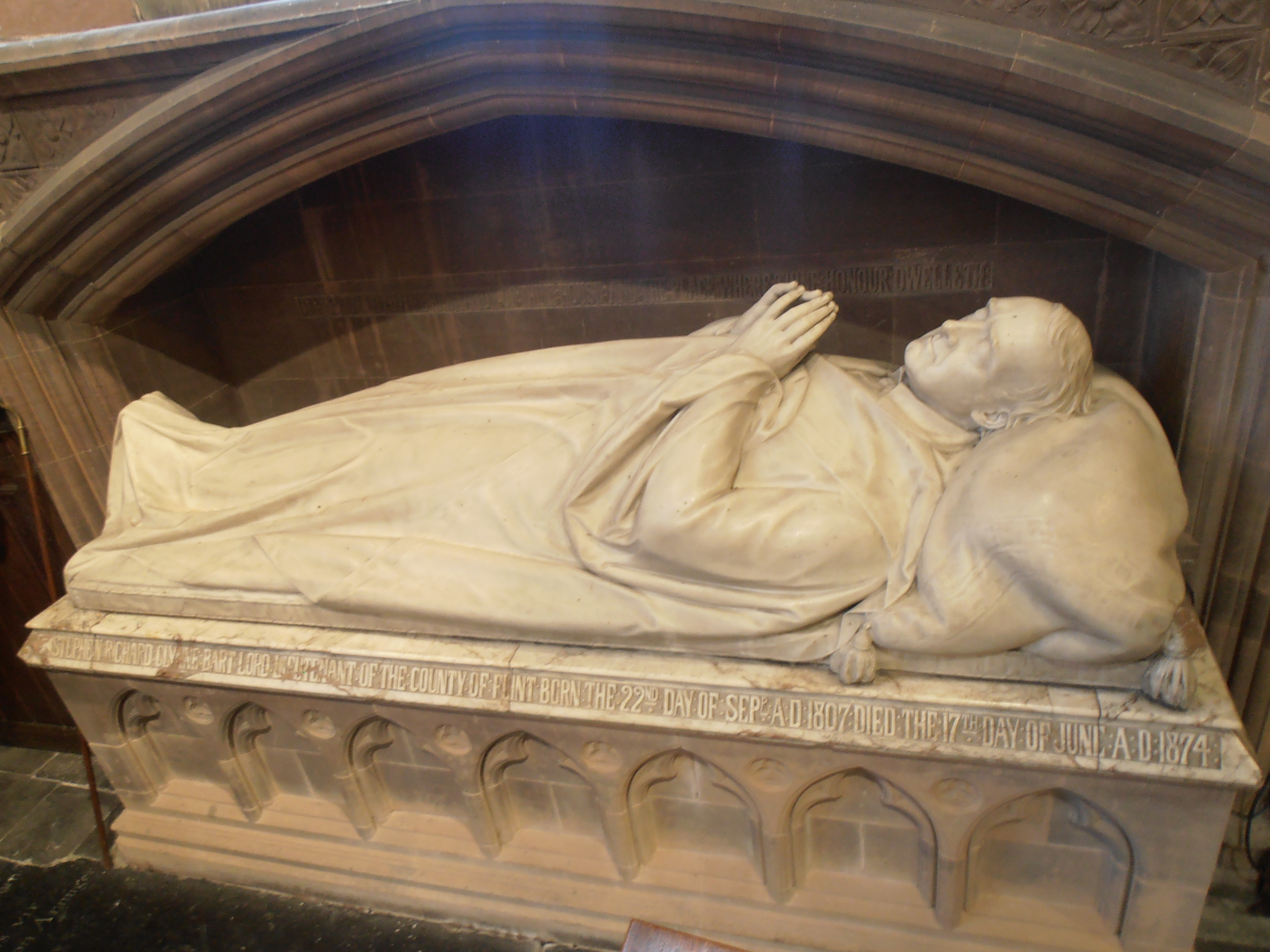
Glynne's tomb in St Deiniol's Church, Hawarden

Glynne collapsed and died outside Bishopsgate railway station, London, on 17 June 1874 after visiting churches in Essex and Suffolk. He was buried in St Deiniol's Church, Hawarden, where he is commemorated by a recumbent effigy by Matthew Noble in a tomb recess designed by John Douglas.

He never married, and the baronetcy became extinct on his death. The Hawarden estate and castle was left to his nephew William Henry Gladstone, the eldest son of William and Catherine.

== Notebooks ==
Glynne's church notes, in 106 volumes, are now housed at Gladstone's Library (formerly St Deiniol's Library), Hawarden; but are made available to researchers through Flintshire Record Office. A single notebook of a six-week tour made in 1824 is in the National Library of Wales. Glynne generally made his notes on the right-hand pages of his notebooks, reserving the left-hand pages for later addenda and sketches. His original manuscript notes for Kent, which were published by W. H. Gladstone in 1877, are believed to have been destroyed.

== Published editions ==
In the years 1845–1848, Glynne published 72 of his descriptions of churches anonymously in The Ecclesiologist (journal of the Ecclesiological Society). Otherwise, his notes remained unpublished during his lifetime. Following his death, his nephew W. H. Gladstone published his church notes for Kent in 1877; and since then, a growing number of others have appeared in print. Editions have mostly been arranged by county, and have in many cases been published by local archaeological and record societies. They include:

=== England ===
Bedfordshire

- Pickford, Chris, ed. (1994). Bedfordshire Churches in the Nineteenth Century: part 1: parishes A to G. Bedfordshire Historical Record Society. Vol. 73. Bedford: Bedfordshire Historical Record Society. ISBN 0851550568.
- Pickford, Chris, ed. (1998). Bedfordshire Churches in the Nineteenth Century: part 2: parishes Harlington to Roxton. Bedfordshire Historical Record Society. Vol. 77. Bedford: Bedfordshire Historical Record Society. ISBN 0851550606.
- Pickford, Chris, ed. (2000). Bedfordshire Churches in the Nineteenth Century: part 3: parishes Salford to Yelden. Bedfordshire Historical Record Society. Vol. 79. Bedford: Bedfordshire Historical Record Society. ISBN 0851550630.
- Pickford, Chris, ed. (2001). Bedfordshire Churches in the Nineteenth Century: part 4: appendices and index. Bedfordshire Historical Record Society. Vol. 80. Bedford: Bedfordshire Historical Record Society. ISBN 0851550649.

(These volumes include Glynne's church notes alongside near-contemporary notes and descriptions by Henry Bonney and John Martin, and archival records.)
Cheshire

- Glynne, S. R. (1894). Atkinson, J. A. (ed.). Notes on the Churches of Cheshire. Chetham Society n.s. Vol. 32. Manchester: Chetham Society.

Cornwall

- Cann-Hughes, T., ed. (1934–35). "Sir Stephen Glynne's Notes on the Churches of Cornwall". Notes and Queries. 167: 363–6, 400–02, 438–9.; 168: 5–7, 42–5, 74–7, 111–3, 151–3, 182–4, 219–20, 255–60, 295–7, 329–31, 366–8, 399–41, 437–9; 169: 6–8, 43–5, 78–81, 112–5.
- Cockerham, Paul, ed. (2024). Cornish Churches in the Nineteenth Century: the church notes of the Lysons brothers and Sir Stephen Glynne: Volume 1: A–L. Devon and Cornwall Record Society. Vol. 67. Martlesham: Boydell & Brewer. ISBN 9780901853431.

(This volume includes Glynne's church notes alongside those of the early 19th-century antiquaries Daniel and Samuel Lysons.)
Cumberland and Westmorland

- Butler, Lawrence, ed. (2011). The Church Notes of Sir Stephen Glynne for Cumbria (1833–1872). Extra Series. Vol. 36. Kendal: Cumberland and Westmorland Antiquarian and Archaeological Society. ISBN 978-1-873124-52-9.

(This volume covers the area of the modern administrative county of Cumbria: i.e. the historic counties of Cumberland and Westmorland, and the Furness region, historically part of Lancashire.)
Derbyshire

- Hopkinson, Aileen; Hopkinson, Vincent; Bateman, Wendy, eds. (2004). The Derbyshire Church Notes of Sir Stephen Glynne, 1825–1873. Derbyshire Record Society. Vol. 32. Chesterfield: Derbyshire Record Society. ISBN 0-946324-28-X.

Devon

- Cann-Hughes, T., ed. (1932–34). "Sir Stephen Glynne's Notes on the Churches of Devon". Notes and Queries. 163: 328–31, 363–5, 400–02, 437–41, 471–5.; 164: 21–6, 57–60, 95–6, 130–32, 169–71, 200–04, 236–9, 277–80, 313–5, 348–51, 385–7, 416–7, 454–6; 165: 20–22, 63–5, 96–8, 130–32, 168–70, 204–6, 241–3, 274–7, 314–6, 349–51, 382–4, 420–22, 456–8; 166: 24–7, 63–5, 93–5, 131–3, 168–70, 200–03.

Dorset

- Glynne, Sir Stephen (1923–24). Fletcher, J. M. J. (ed.). "Notes on some Dorset Churches". Proceedings of the Dorset Natural History and Antiquarian Field Club. 44: 86–104.; 45: 12–74.

County Durham and Northumberland

- Glynne, S. R. (1907–1908). "Durham and Northumberland Church Notes". Proceedings of the Society of Antiquaries of Newcastle-upon-Tyne. 3rd ser. 3.

Essex

- Glynne, S. R. (1934). "Sir Stephen Glynne's notes on the churches of Prittlewell and Leigh". Transactions of the Southend-on-Sea & District Antiquarian & Historical Society. 2 (4): 277–8.

Gloucestershire

- Glynne, S. R. (1902). Phillimore, W. P. W.; Melland Hall, J. (eds.). Gloucestershire Church Notes. London: Phillimore.

Herefordshire

- Leonard, John, ed. (2006). Herefordshire Churches through Victorian Eyes: Sir Stephen Glynne's church notes for Herefordshire. Woonton Almeley: Logaston Press. ISBN 978-1-904396-59-8.

Kent

- Glynne, S. R. (1877). Gladstone, W. H. (ed.). Notes on the Churches of Kent. London: Murray.

Lancashire

- Glynne, S. R. (1893). Atkinson, J. A. (ed.). Notes on the Churches of Lancashire. Chetham Society n.s. Vol. 27. Manchester: Chetham Society.

(For the Furness area, see also Cumberland and Westmorland.)
Nottinghamshire

- Butler, Lawrence; Beckett, John, eds. (2020). The Nottinghamshire Church Notes of Sir Stephen Glynne, 1825–1874. Thoroton Society Record Series. Vol. 49. Bristol: Thoroton Society of Nottinghamshire. ISBN 9780902719279.

Shropshire

- Cox, D. C., ed. (1997). Sir Stephen Glynne's Church Notes for Shropshire. Keele: Centre for Local History, University of Keele. ISBN 0-9513713-7-1.

Somerset

- McGarvie, Michael, ed. (1994). Sir Stephen Glynne's Church Notes for Somerset. Somerset Record Society. Vol. 82. Taunton: Somerset Record Society. ISBN 0-901732-30-3.

Suffolk

- Pollard, K. G., ed. (1973). "Sir Stephen Glynne's Ipswich Church Notes, 1832 and 1844". Proceedings of the Suffolk Institute of Archaeology. 32: 71–9.

Surrey

- Sherlock, R. J. (1958). "Sir Stephen Glynne's Notes on the Churches of Surrey". Surrey Archaeological Collections. 55: 65–117. doi:10.5284/1068898.

Sussex

- Torr, V. J., ed. (1963–68). "Glynne on Sussex Churches". Sussex Notes and Queries. 16: 53–62, 96–101, 128–31, 162–66, 198–200, 234–37, 267–70, 339–49.; 17: 41–45. (The entries published by Torr are highly selective.)
- Parsons, David, ed. (2021). Sir Stephen Glynne's Sussex Church Notes. Sussex Record Society. Vol. 101. Lewes: Sussex Record Society. ISBN 978-0-85445-083-1.

Wiltshire

- Glynne, Sir Stephen (1922–24). "Notes on Wiltshire Churches". Wiltshire Archaeological and Natural History Magazine. 42: 167–214, 277–306.

Yorkshire

- Butler, Lawrence, ed. (2007). The Yorkshire Church Notes of Sir Stephen Glynne (1825–1874). Yorkshire Archaeological Society Record Series. Vol. 159. Leeds: Yorkshire Archaeological Society. ISBN 978-1-903564-80-6.

=== Wales ===
- Glynne, S. R. (2004). Notes on the Older Churches in the Four Welsh Dioceses. Vol. 2. Cribyn: Llanerch Press. ISBN 1-86143-125-2. 2 volumes.

(A facsimile reprint of material first published as articles in Archaeologia Cambrensis, 5th ser. vol. 1 – 6th ser. vol. 2, 1884–1902)

== Bibliography ==
- Butler, Lawrence, ed. (2007). The Yorkshire Church Notes of Sir Stephen Glynne (1825–1874). Record Series. Vol. 159. Leeds: Yorkshire Archaeological Society. ISBN 978-1-903564-80-6.
- Butler, Lawrence, ed. (2011). The Church Notes of Sir Stephen Glynne for Cumbria (1833–1872). Extra Series. Vol. 36. Kendal: Cumberland and Westmorland Antiquarian and Archaeological Society. ISBN 978-1-873124-52-9.
- Butler, Lawrence (2012). "Sir Stephen Glynne and 'The Older Churches of the Four Welsh Dioceses'". In Britnell, William J.; Silvester, Robert J. (eds.). Reflections on the Past: essays in honour of Frances Lynch. Welshpool: Cambrian Archaeological Association. pp. 452–66. ISBN 9780947846084.
- Butler, Lawrence (2013). "Sir Stephen Glynne – a pioneer church recorder". Church Archaeology. 17: 93–105.
- Escott, Margaret (2009). "Glynne, Sir Stephen Richard, 9th bt. (1807–1874), of Hawarden Castle, Flint.". In Fisher, D. R. (ed.). The History of Parliament: the House of Commons 1820–1832. Vol. 5. Cambridge: Cambridge University Press. pp. 293–4.
- Parsons, David (2014). "Sir Stephen Glynne – a pioneer church recorder: a postscript". Church Archaeology. 18: 35–7.
- Pritchard, T. W. (2017). The Glynnes of Hawarden. Hawarden: Gladstone's Library. ISBN 9781527219052.
- Veysey, A. Geoffrey (1981–82). "Sir Stephen Glynne, 1807–74". Flintshire Historical Society Journal. 30: 151–70.
- Veysey, A. Geoffrey (2004). "Glynne, Sir Stephen Richard, ninth baronet (1807–1874)". Oxford Dictionary of National Biography (online ed.). Oxford University Press. doi:10.1093/ref:odnb/10844. (Subscription, Wikipedia Library access or UK public library membership required.)
- Yates, Nigel (1983). "Sir Stephen Glynne and Kentish ecclesiology". In Detsicas, Alec; Yates, Nigel (eds.). Studies in Modern Kentish History. Maidstone: Kent Archaeological Society. pp. 187–201. ISBN 0906746051.

Parliament of the United Kingdom
Preceded by Henry Glynne	Member of Parliament for Flint Boroughs; 1832–1837	Succeeded by Charles Whitley Deans Dundas
Preceded by Edward Lloyd-Mostyn	Member of Parliament for Flintshire; 1837–1841	Succeeded by Edward Lloyd-Mostyn
Preceded by Edward Lloyd-Mostyn	Member of Parliament for Flintshire; 1842–1847	Succeeded by Edward Lloyd-Mostyn
Honorary titles
Preceded by The Marquess of Westminster	Lord Lieutenant of Flintshire; 1845–1874	Succeeded by Hugh Robert Hughes
Baronetage of England
Preceded by Stephen Richard Glynne	Baronet (of Bisseter); 1815–1874	Extinct
