= Alfred Ollivant (bishop) =

British bishop (1798–1882)

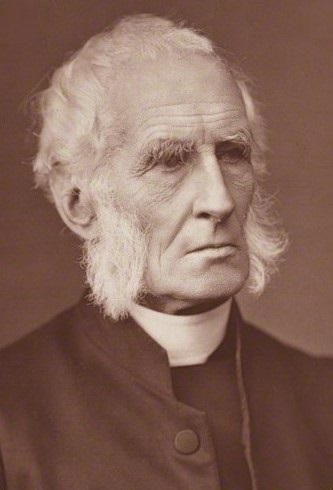
Alfred Ollivant

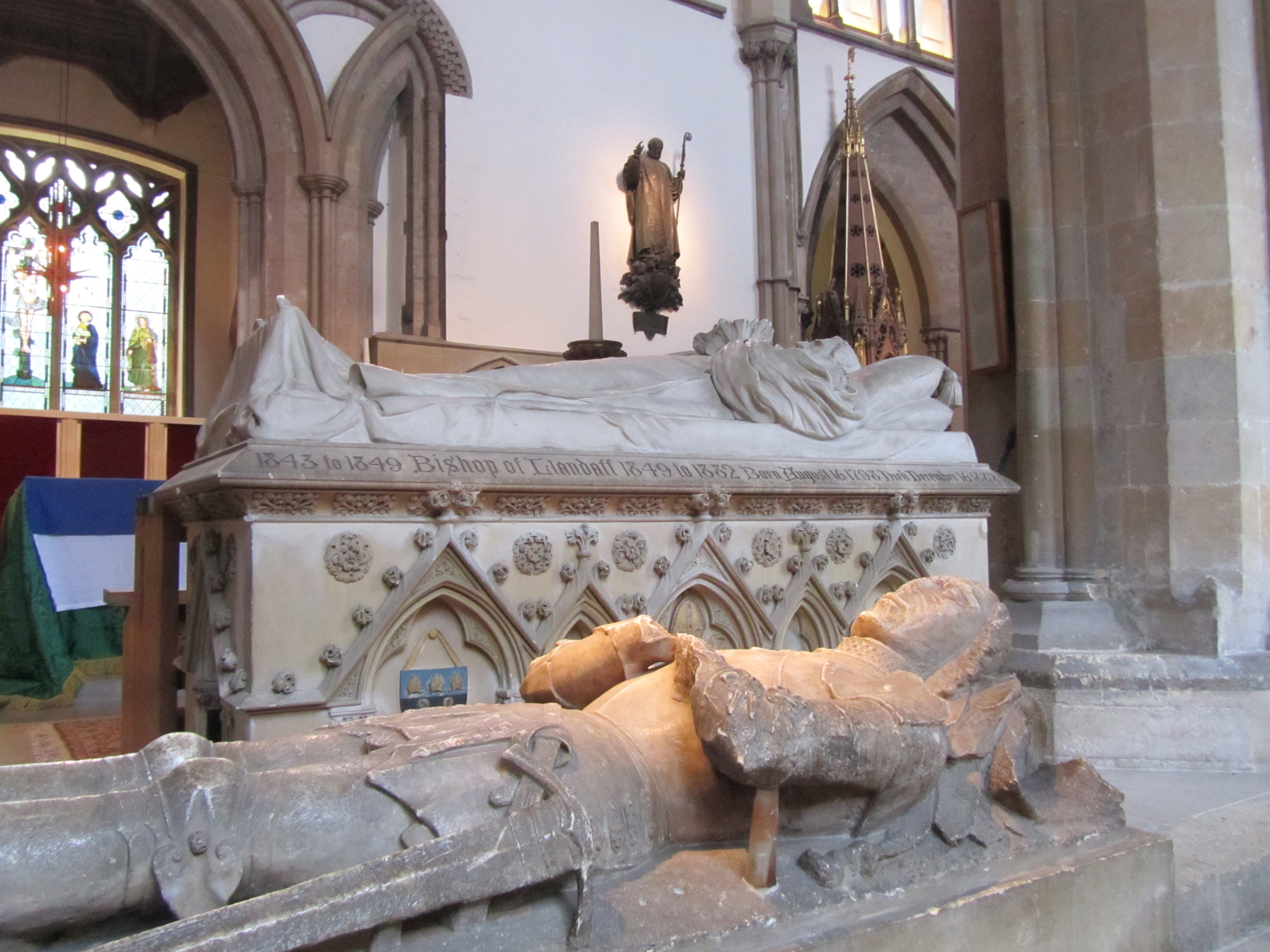
Alfred Ollivant monument in Llandaff Cathedral

Alfred Ollivant (1798 – 16 December 1882) was an academic who went on to become Bishop of Llandaff.

Born in Manchester, he was educated at St Paul's School and Trinity College, Cambridge. He won the Tyrwhitt Hebrew scholarship in 1822 and was elected to a fellowship at Trinity College. In 1827, he was appointed the first vice-principal of St David's College, Lampeter. Whilst at Lampeter, he found time to learn the Welsh language and he preached regularly in that language at Llangeler, where he later became vicar. He returned to Cambridge in 1843 as Regius Professor of Divinity, but in 1849 he was nominated to the see of Llandaff, primarily because of his knowledge of Wales and of the Welsh language. Ollivant was instrumental in the move to construct churches (often by private benefactions from industrialists and landowners) in the newly populated areas of his diocese. A good example was St Elvan's Church, Aberdare, where Ollivant officiated at the opening services in 1852.

As Bishop of Llandaff, Ollivant wrote a book, Some Account of the Condition of the Fabric of Llandaff Cathedral, from 1575 to the present time, intended to raise funds to reestablish a choir at Llandaff Cathedral, where there had been none since 1691, and to purchase an organ for the cathedral, which had been without one for some time.

He died on 16 December 1882, and was buried on 21 December in the Cathedral grounds. A monument of his image was placed in the chancel of the Cathedral, near the high altar, and remarkably it escaped damage when the cathedral was bombed in 1941.

Honorary titles
Preceded by New Position	Vice-principal of St Davids College, Lampeter; 1827–1843	Succeeded by Edward Harold Browne
Academic offices
Preceded by Thomas Turton	Regius Professor of Divinity at Cambridge; 1843—1849	Succeeded by James Amiraux Jeremie
Religious titles
Preceded by Edward Copleston	Bishop of Llandaff; 1849–1882	Succeeded by Richard Lewis
