= 1840s in Wales =

- 1830s | 1850s | Other years in Wales
- Other events of the decade

This article is about the particular significance of the decade 1840–1849 to Wales and its people.

== Events ==
- 1840
- 1841
- 1842
- 1843
- 1844
- 1845
- 1846
- 1847
- 1848
- 1849

== Arts and literature ==
=== New books ===
==== English language ====
- Anne Beale — Traits and Stories of the Welsh Peasantry (1849)
- John Hughes — The Self-Searcher (1848)
- John Jenkins — National Education (1848)
- Samuel Lewis — Topographical Dictionary of Wales (1849)
- John Lloyd
  - Poems (1847)
  - The English Country Gentleman (1849)
- Richard Williams Morgan — Maynooth and St. Asaph (1848)
- Edward Parry — Railway Companion from Chester to Holyhead (1848)
- Thomas Stephens — The Literature of the Kymry (1849)

==== Welsh language ====
- Robert Elis (Cynddelw) — Yr Adgyfodiad (1849)
- Morris Williams (Nicander)
  - Y Flwyddyn Eglwysig (1843)
  - Llyfr yr Homiliau (1847)

=== Music ===
- Rosser Beynon — Telyn Seion (1845)
- John Ambrose Lloyd — Y Ganaan Glyd (1845)
- Rowland Prichard — Cyfaill y Cantorion (The Singer's Friend) (1844)
- Robert Herbert Williams — Alawydd Trefriw (1848)
