= 1843 in Wales =

- Centuries: 17th; 18th; 19th; 20th; 21st
- Decades: 1820s; 1830s; 1840s; 1850s; 1860s
- See also: List of years in Wales; Timeline of Welsh history 1843 in The United Kingdom Scotland Elsewhere

This article is about the particular significance of the year 1843 to Wales and its people.

== Incumbents ==
- Lord Lieutenant of Anglesey – Henry Paget, 1st Marquess of Anglesey
- Lord Lieutenant of Brecknockshire – Penry Williams
- Lord Lieutenant of Caernarvonshire – Peter Drummond-Burrell, 22nd Baron Willoughby de Eresby
- Lord Lieutenant of Cardiganshire – William Edward Powell
- Lord Lieutenant of Carmarthenshire – George Rice, 3rd Baron Dynevor
- Lord Lieutenant of Denbighshire – Robert Myddelton Biddulph
- Lord Lieutenant of Flintshire – Robert Grosvenor, 1st Marquess of Westminster
- Lord Lieutenant of Glamorgan – John Crichton-Stuart, 2nd Marquess of Bute
- Lord Lieutenant of Merionethshire – Edward Lloyd-Mostyn, 2nd Baron Mostyn
- Lord Lieutenant of Monmouthshire – Capel Hanbury Leigh
- Lord Lieutenant of Montgomeryshire – Edward Herbert, 2nd Earl of Powis
- Lord Lieutenant of Pembrokeshire – Sir John Owen, 1st Baronet
- Lord Lieutenant of Radnorshire – Bishop of Bangor
- Bishop of Bangor – Christopher Bethell
- Bishop of Llandaff – Edward Copleston
- Bishop of St Asaph – William Carey
- Bishop of St Davids – Connop Thirlwall

== Events ==
- 15 April – Death of William Howells, the notorious "Laleston poisoning" case. His sister and brother-in-law are later acquitted of his murder.
- 19 June – An attack on the Carmarthen Workhouse is blamed on "Chartists and the rabble of the town". After the disturbances, the Lord Lieutenant of Carmarthenshire, George Rice Trevor, 4th Baron Dynevor, takes on the responsibility for administering order in the county.
- 22 June – The Times sends a special correspondent to South Wales to cover the Rebecca Riots.
- 25 August – "The Great Meeting" (Y Cyfarfod Mawr) to seek political solutions to the problems underlying the Rebecca Riots is held on Mynydd Sylen in the Gwendraeth valley.
- October – Sir Thomas Frankland Lewis is appointed to chair the commission of enquiry into the Rebecca Riots.
- 1 November – The foundation stone for the first Beaumaris Pier is laid.
- 22 December – John Jones (Shoni Sguborfawr), one of the ringleaders of the Rebecca Riots is sentenced to transportation to Australia.
- Pontardawe Tinplate Works established.
- Llewelyn Lewellin becomes Dean of St David's.

== Arts and literature ==
=== New books ===
- Daniel Silvan Evans – Blodeu Ieuainc
- Morris Williams (Nicander) – Y Flwyddyn Eglwysig

=== Music ===
- David Hughes (Cristiolus Môn) – Y Perorydd Cysegredig
- John Orlando Parry – The Accomplished Young Lady

== Births ==
- 8 January – John Bryn Roberts, lawyer and politician (died 1931)
- 12 February – John Graham Chambers, sportsman who codified the Marquess of Queensberry rules (died 1883)
- 17 April – Richard John Lloyd Price, sportsman and squire of Rhiwlas (died 1923)
- 12 May – Thomas William Rhys Davids, founder of the Pali Text Society (died 1922)
- 21 May – John Hugh Jones, Roman Catholic priest, translator, and tutor (died 1910)
- 11 June – James Milo Griffith, sculptor (died 1897)
- 18 July – Sir Morgan Morgan, politician (died 1894)
- 4 August – Margaret Townsend Jenkins, social reformer and educator who worked in Chile and Canada (died 1923)
- 30 August – Cyril Flower, 1st Baron Battersea, MP for Brecon 1880–1885 (died 1907)
- 12 September – William Morris, Baptist minister (died 1922)
- 17 September – Hugh Williams, historian (died 1911)
- 14 November – Jenkin Lloyd Jones, Unitarian minister in the United States (died 1918)
- 23 November – Daniel Lewis Lloyd, Bishop of Bangor (died 1899)
- 20 December – Frances Hoggan, first British woman to qualify as a doctor (died 1927)
- date unknown – Peter Rees Jones, businessman (died 1905)

== Deaths ==
- 31 January – William Henry Scourfield, Member of Parliament, 66?
- 26 March – Robert Richford Roberts, Welsh-descended Methodist leader in the United States, 64
- 27 March – Henry Nevill, 2nd Earl of Abergavenny, 88
- 23 April – Sir Robert Vaughan, 2nd Baronet, landowner and politician, 75
- 19 May – Charles James Apperley ("Nimrod"), sports writer, 64?
- 18 December – Dic Aberdaron (Richard Robert Jones), polyglot, 62/63
- date unknown – Mary Evans (Mrs Fryer Todd), first love of Samuel Taylor Coleridge, 73?

== See also ==
- 1843 in Ireland
