= 1848 in Wales =

- Centuries: 17th; 18th; 19th; 20th; 21st
- Decades: 1820s; 1830s; 1840s; 1850s; 1860s
- See also: List of years in Wales; Timeline of Welsh history 1848 in The United Kingdom Scotland Elsewhere

This article is about the particular significance of the year 1848 to Wales and its people.

== Incumbents ==
- Lord Lieutenant of Anglesey – Henry Paget, 1st Marquess of Anglesey
- Lord Lieutenant of Brecknockshire – John Lloyd Vaughan Watkins
- Lord Lieutenant of Caernarvonshire – Peter Drummond-Burrell, 22nd Baron Willoughby de Eresby
- Lord Lieutenant of Cardiganshire – William Edward Powell
- Lord Lieutenant of Carmarthenshire – George Rice, 3rd Baron Dynevor
- Lord Lieutenant of Denbighshire – Robert Myddelton Biddulph
- Lord Lieutenant of Flintshire – Sir Stephen Glynne, 9th Baronet
- Lord Lieutenant of Glamorgan – John Crichton-Stuart, 2nd Marquess of Bute (until 18 March); Christopher Rice Mansel Talbot (from 4 May)
- Lord Lieutenant of Merionethshire – Edward Lloyd-Mostyn, 2nd Baron Mostyn
- Lord Lieutenant of Monmouthshire – Capel Hanbury Leigh
- Lord Lieutenant of Montgomeryshire – Edward Herbert, 2nd Earl of Powis (until 17 January); Charles Hanbury-Tracy, 1st Baron Sudeley (from 26 February)
- Lord Lieutenant of Pembrokeshire – Sir John Owen, 1st Baronet
- Lord Lieutenant of Radnorshire – John Walsh, 1st Baron Ormathwaite
- Bishop of Bangor – Christopher Bethell
- Bishop of Llandaff – Edward Copleston
- Bishop of St Asaph – Thomas Vowler Short
- Bishop of St Davids – Connop Thirlwall

== Events ==
- 1 March – Llandovery College opens in the building known as the "Depot".
- 1 May – Opening for Chester and Holyhead Railway traffic of the first tube of Robert Stephenson's Conwy Railway Bridge.
- 1 August – Opening of an isolated section of the Chester and Holyhead Railway across Anglesey from Llanfair to Holyhead.
- 24 August – The American barque Ocean Monarch, loaded with would-be immigrants, catches fire off Colwyn Bay, with the loss of 178 lives.
- 24 October – Trinity College, Carmarthen is established (as the South Wales and Monmouthshire Training College), to train teachers for Church of England schools.
- 14 November – Opening of the North Wales County Pauper Lunatic Asylum (North Wales Hospital), Denbigh.
- The new Llandeilo Bridge is completed, with a span of 145 feet (44 m) over the River Towy.
- Merthyr Tydfil Hebrew Congregation formed.
- Butchers' Market in Wrexham opened.
- Michael D. Jones becomes a minister in Cincinnati, Ohio.

== Arts and literature ==
=== New books ===
- John Hughes - The Self-Searcher
- John Jenkins - National Education
- Richard Williams Morgan - Maynooth and St. Asaph
- Edward Parry - Railway Companion from Chester to Holyhead

=== Music ===
- Robert Herbert Williams - Alawydd Trefriw

=== Visual arts ===
- John Evan Thomas - Death of Tewdric Mawr, King of Gwent (sculpture)

== Births ==
- 12 February – Beriah Gwynfe Evans, journalist and dramatist (died 1927)
- 18 September – Robert Harris, painter (died 1919)
- 5 October – Sir John Purser Griffiths, civil engineer (died 1938)
- 2 November – A. G. Edwards, first Archbishop of Wales (died 1917)
- 30 December – David Jenkins, composer (died 1915)
- Charles Ashton police officer, literary historian and bibliophile (suicide 1899)

== Deaths ==
- 17 January – Edward Herbert, 2nd Earl of Powis, 63 (accidentally shot by his son)
- 23 February – Lord Granville Somerset, MP for Monmouthshire, 55
- 18 March – John Crichton-Stuart, 2nd Marquess of Bute, creator of modern Cardiff, 54
- 27 March – William Ellis Jones, poet, 52
- 2 April – Sir Samuel Rush Meyrick, antiquary, 64
- 7 November – Thomas Price (Carnhuanawc), poet and historian, 61
- 15 November – David Hiram Williams, geologist and surveyor, 36
- 23 December – James Cowles Prichard, physician and ethnologist of Welsh parentage, 62

== See also ==
- 1848 in Ireland
