= 1844 in Wales =

- Centuries: 17th; 18th; 19th; 20th; 21st
- Decades: 1820s; 1830s; 1840s; 1850s; 1860s
- See also: List of years in Wales; Timeline of Welsh history 1844 in The United Kingdom Scotland Elsewhere

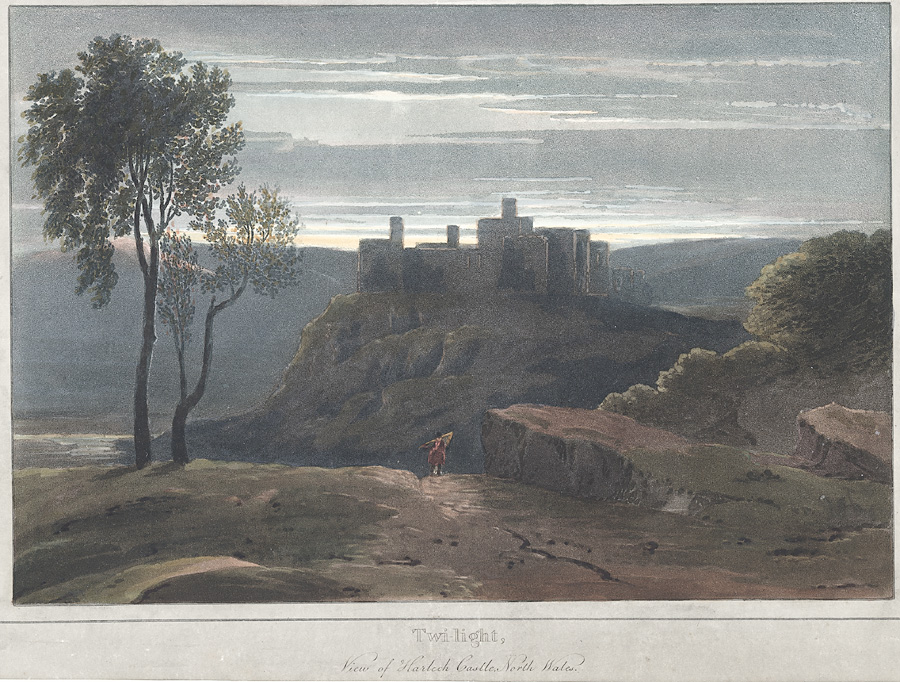
Harlech Caste in north Wales by artist David Cox who visited Betws-y-Coed for the first time in 1844

This article is about the particular significance of the year 1844 to Wales and its people.

== Incumbents ==
- Lord Lieutenant of Anglesey – Henry Paget, 1st Marquess of Anglesey
- Lord Lieutenant of Brecknockshire – Penry Williams
- Lord Lieutenant of Caernarvonshire – Peter Drummond-Burrell, 22nd Baron Willoughby de Eresby
- Lord Lieutenant of Cardiganshire – William Edward Powell
- Lord Lieutenant of Carmarthenshire – George Rice, 3rd Baron Dynevor
- Lord Lieutenant of Denbighshire – Robert Myddelton Biddulph
- Lord Lieutenant of Flintshire – Robert Grosvenor, 1st Marquess of Westminster
- Lord Lieutenant of Glamorgan – John Crichton-Stuart, 2nd Marquess of Bute
- Lord Lieutenant of Merionethshire – Edward Lloyd-Mostyn, 2nd Baron Mostyn
- Lord Lieutenant of Monmouthshire – Capel Hanbury Leigh
- Lord Lieutenant of Montgomeryshire – Edward Herbert, 2nd Earl of Powis
- Lord Lieutenant of Pembrokeshire – Sir John Owen, 1st Baronet
- Lord Lieutenant of Radnorshire – John Walsh, 1st Baron Ormathwaite
- Bishop of Bangor – Christopher Bethell
- Bishop of Llandaff – Edward Copleston
- Bishop of St Asaph – William Carey
- Bishop of St Davids – Connop Thirlwall

== Events ==
- 1 January - 11 or 12 men are killed in a mining accident at Dinas Middle Colliery, Rhondda.
- 14 February - 40 men are killed when the Cleddau floods the Garden Pit coal-mine at Landshipping, Pembrokeshire.
- 8 March - John Jones (Shoni Sguborfawr) embarks on the Blundell for transportation to Norfolk Island, his sentence for shooting at a man during the Rebecca Riots.
- 13 May - 7 or 8 men are killed in a mining accident at Broadmoor, Loveston, Pembrokeshire.
- 3 December - 6 men are killed in a mining accident at Fforest Level, Dinas, Rhondda.
- 31 December - David Williams takes out a lease on a mine at Cwmbach, in partnership with Lewis Lewis (of Cefn Coed.
- date unknown
  - A prospectus is issued to potential investors in a railway to be built through south Wales from a junction with the Great Western Railway at Standish in Gloucestershire.
  - Owen Owen Roberts is instrumental in setting up the first hospital for Caernarvonshire and Anglesey, at Bangor.

== Arts and literature ==
=== New books ===
- Hugh Derfel Hughes - Blodau'r Gân
- David Owen (Brutus) - Eliasia

=== Music ===
- Rowland Prichard - Cyfaill y Cantorion (The Singer's Friend)
- Maria Jane Williams - Ancient National Airs of Gwent and Morgannwg

=== Visual arts ===
- English watercolour landscape painter David Cox spends his first summer at Betws-y-Coed, which he will continue to do until 1856.

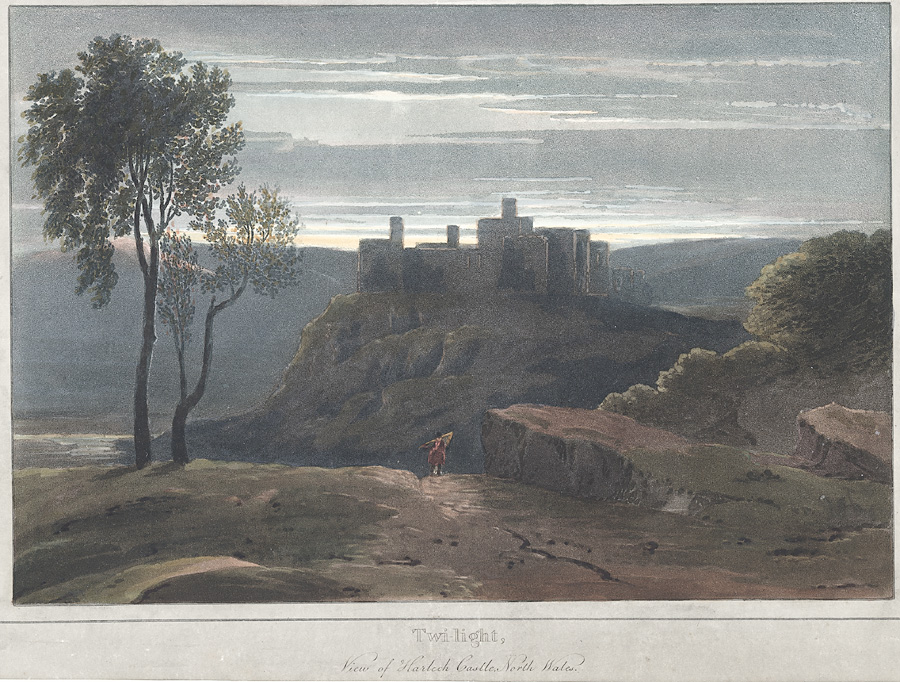
Print of Harlech Caste in north Wales by David Cox

== Sport ==
- Denbigh Cricket Club is founded.

== Births ==
- 1 January - Robert Clayton, cricketer (died 1901)
- 7 March - Watkin Hezekiah Williams, poet and schoolmaster (died 1905)
- 28 April - Thomas Jones (Tudno), poet (died 1895)
- June - John Roland Phillips, historian (died 1887)
- 28 July - Gerard Manley Hopkins, Welsh-descended poet (died 1889)
- 3 August - Herbert Armitage James, clergyman and schoolmaster (died 1931)
- 1 December - Alexandra of Denmark, Princess of Wales 1901-1910 (died 1925)

== Deaths ==
- 18 January - Azariah Shadrach, minister and author, 69
- 7 April - Morgan Lewis, Welsh-descended American politician, 89
- 8 November - Iltid Nicholl, lawyer, 67/68
- 23 November - Thomas William, hymn-writer, 83

== See also ==
- 1844 in Ireland
