= 1842 in Wales =

- Centuries: 17th; 18th; 19th; 20th; 21st
- Decades: 1820s; 1830s; 1840s; 1850s; 1860s
- See also: List of years in Wales; Timeline of Welsh history 1842 in The United Kingdom Scotland Elsewhere

This article is about the particular significance of the year 1842 to Wales and its people.

== Incumbents ==
- Lord Lieutenant of Anglesey – Henry Paget, 1st Marquess of Anglesey
- Lord Lieutenant of Brecknockshire – Penry Williams
- Lord Lieutenant of Caernarvonshire – Peter Drummond-Burrell, 22nd Baron Willoughby de Eresby
- Lord Lieutenant of Cardiganshire – William Edward Powell
- Lord Lieutenant of Carmarthenshire – George Rice, 3rd Baron Dynevor
- Lord Lieutenant of Denbighshire – Robert Myddelton Biddulph
- Lord Lieutenant of Flintshire – Robert Grosvenor, 1st Marquess of Westminster
- Lord Lieutenant of Glamorgan – John Crichton-Stuart, 2nd Marquess of Bute
- Lord Lieutenant of Merionethshire – Edward Lloyd-Mostyn, 2nd Baron Mostyn
- Lord Lieutenant of Monmouthshire – Capel Hanbury Leigh
- Lord Lieutenant of Montgomeryshire – Edward Herbert, 2nd Earl of Powis
- Lord Lieutenant of Pembrokeshire – Sir John Owen, 1st Baronet
- Lord Lieutenant of Radnorshire – George Rodney, 3rd Baron Rodney
- Bishop of Bangor – Christopher Bethell
- Bishop of Llandaff – Edward Copleston
- Bishop of St Asaph – William Carey
- Bishop of St Davids – Connop Thirlwall

== Events ==
- 12 April – Chartist Convention meets in London to arrange to submit another petition to parliament. Delegates include Morgan Williams, who brings with him a petition signed by 36,000 people from south Wales.
- 7 May – John Bennion of Flintshire, and his wife Elizabeth, arrive in Nauvoo on the John Cummins to join the Mormon community.
- 12 June – The first Welsh language service in Waukesha County, USA, is held at Bronyberllan, home of Richard "King" Jones.
- July
  - The Rebecca Riots, which had seen sporadic outbreaks in 1839, begin in earnest.
  - Boughrood bridge completed over the River Wye.
- August – Workers at Cyfarthfa and Penydarren ironworks join the general strike.
- 30 August – Sir William Nott defeats the Afghans at Ghazni.
- 10 October – The Town Dock at Newport is opened.
- date unknown
  - Missionary Thomas Jones produces his first Khasi Reader and his translation of a Welsh-language work Rhodd Mam ("A Mother's Gift") into the Khasi language.
  - A Royal Commission chaired by Robert Hugh Franks reports on the employment of children in the coal industry in South Wales. They find that children as young as six are working twelve-hour shifts underground.
  - A stone viaduct is built to carry the Glyncorrwg Mineral Railway Railway.
  - Henry Robertson arrives in Wales to work as an engineer. Later he settles near Wrexham and builds Palé Hall.
  - John Cory and his family move to the docks area of Cardiff and open a ship's chandlery business.
  - Henry Hussey Vivian takes over the management of the Liverpool branch of the firm of Vivian and Sons.
  - A Calvinistic Methodist mission to "the Welsh people in France" is established by Rev James Williams and his wife in Brittany.
  - Two explosions at the Blackvein Colliery in Crosskeys result in a total of five deaths.

== Arts and literature ==
=== New books ===
- Charles James Apperley (Nimrod) – The Life of a Sportsman
- Anne Beale – Poems
- Thomas Price (Carnhuanawc) – A History of Wales to the Death of Llywelyn ap Gruffydd, vol. 14

=== Music ===
- John Orlando Parry – Anticipations of Switzerland

== Births ==
- 12 February – Megan Watts Hughes, singer (died 1907)
- 11 March – Sarah Edith Wynne, singer (died 1897)
- 29 March – Emilia Baeyertz, née Aronson, Jewish-born Christian evangelist (died 1926 in England)
- 15 April – John Hughes (Glanystwyth), minister (died 1902)
- 14 June – William Abraham (Mabon), politician (died 1922)
- 28 September – William John Parry, quarrymen's leader (died 1927)
- 31 October – Moses Owen Jones, musician (died 1908)
- 19 December – Daniel Thomas Phillips, minister and American consul (died 1905)

== Deaths ==
- 26 May – Benjamin Heath Malkin, antiquary and author, 73
- September – William Ouseley, orientalist, 73
- 10 November – John Jones of Ystrad, politician, 65
- 22 December – Thomas Phillips, minister and writer, 70

== See also ==
- 1842 in Ireland
