= 1850 in Wales =

- Centuries: 17th; 18th; 19th; 20th; 21st
- Decades: 1830s; 1840s; 1850s; 1860s; 1870s
- See also: List of years in Wales; Timeline of Welsh history 1850 in The United Kingdom Scotland Elsewhere

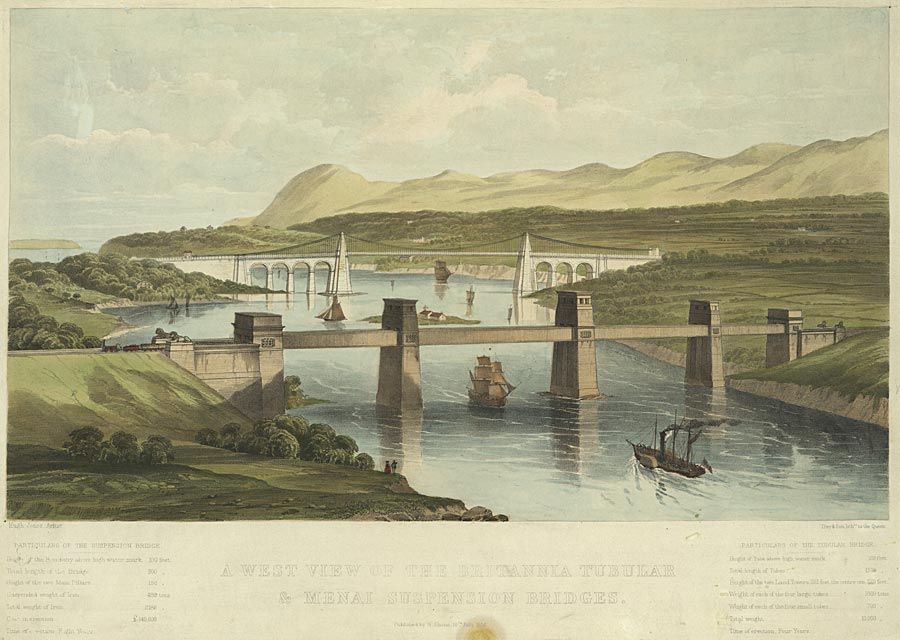

This article is about the particular significance of the year 1850 to Wales and its people.

== Incumbents ==
- Lord Lieutenant of Anglesey – Henry Paget, 1st Marquess of Anglesey
- Lord Lieutenant of Brecknockshire – John Lloyd Vaughan Watkins
- Lord Lieutenant of Caernarvonshire – Peter Drummond-Burrell, 22nd Baron Willoughby de Eresby
- Lord Lieutenant of Cardiganshire – William Edward Powell
- Lord Lieutenant of Carmarthenshire – George Rice, 3rd Baron Dynevor
- Lord Lieutenant of Denbighshire – Robert Myddelton Biddulph
- Lord Lieutenant of Flintshire – Sir Stephen Glynne, 9th Baronet
- Lord Lieutenant of Glamorgan – Christopher Rice Mansel Talbot (from 4 May)
- Lord Lieutenant of Merionethshire – Edward Lloyd-Mostyn, 2nd Baron Mostyn
- Lord Lieutenant of Monmouthshire – Capel Hanbury Leigh
- Lord Lieutenant of Montgomeryshire – Charles Hanbury-Tracy, 1st Baron Sudeley
- Lord Lieutenant of Pembrokeshire – Sir John Owen, 1st Baronet
- Lord Lieutenant of Radnorshire – John Walsh, 1st Baron Ormathwaite
- Bishop of Bangor – Christopher Bethell
- Bishop of Llandaff – Alfred Ollivant
- Bishop of St Asaph – Thomas Vowler Short
- Bishop of St Davids – Connop Thirlwall

== Events ==
- 18 March – Opening of the Britannia Bridge.
- 3 April – G. T. Clark marries Ann Price Lewis, a descendant of one of the original partners in the Dowlais Ironworks.
- 18 June – Opening of the South Wales Railway between Chepstow and Swansea.
- October – The Merthyr Board of Health is founded, with John Josiah Guest as its first chairman.
- November – The first issue of the periodical Y Drych is printed, though not in circulation for another two months
- 14 December – 13 men are killed in a mining accident at New Duffryn Colliery, Mountain Ash.
- unknown dates
  - The Llanelli Board of Health is founded, with William Chambers as its first chairman.
  - Vaendre Hall in the village of St Mellons is completed, the home of the industrialist John Cory.

== Arts and literature ==
=== New books ===
- Thomas Edwards (Caerfallwch) – Geirlyfr Saesoneg a Chymraeg, An English and Welsh Dictionary
- 'Elen Egryn' (Elin Evans) – Telyn Egryn (poems)
- Elijah Waring – Recollections and Anecdotes of Edward Williams
- Morris Williams (Nicander) – Y Psalmwyr

=== Music ===
- September – North Wales Musical Festival is held at Rhuddlan Castle.

== Births ==
- 1 January – Evan Rees (Dyfed), minister, poet and archdruid (died 1923)
- 4 January – Griffith J. Griffith, industrialist (died 1919)
- 16 April – Sidney Gilchrist Thomas, inventor (died 1885)
- 24 November – John Aeron Thomas, politician (died 1935)
- date unknown
  - Alfred Davies, footballer (died 1891)
  - John Evan Davies, minister and author (died 1929)
  - Owen Owen, teacher and schools inspector (died 1920)

== Deaths ==
- 11 April
  - David Hughes, clergyman and writer, 64?
  - Edward Hughes (Y Dryw), poet, 77
- 18 April – John Richards, Welsh-born US politician, 85
- 19 April – Sir John Edwards of Garth, politician, 80
- 11 July – Robert Williams (Robert ap Gwilym Ddu), poet and hymn-writer, 83
- 28 July – David Lewis, Carmarthenshire priest and writer, 90?
- 2 September – Charles Williams-Wynn, politician, 74
- 19 December – George Williams, politician, 85

== See also ==
- 1850 in Ireland
