= 1847 in Wales =

- Centuries: 17th; 18th; 19th; 20th; 21st
- Decades: 1820s; 1830s; 1840s; 1850s; 1860s
- See also: List of years in Wales; Timeline of Welsh history 1847 in The United Kingdom Scotland Elsewhere

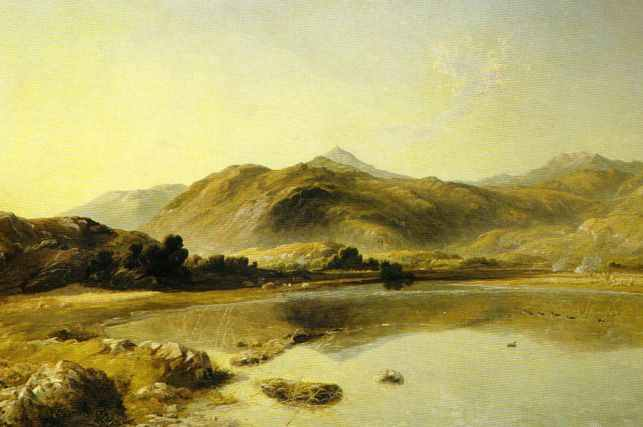
A view of Moel Siabod, 1847, by Thomas Danby

This article is about the particular significance of the year 1847 to Wales and its people.

== Incumbents ==
- Lord Lieutenant of Anglesey – Henry Paget, 1st Marquess of Anglesey
- Lord Lieutenant of Brecknockshire – Penry Williams (until 16 January); John Lloyd Vaughan Watkins (from 17 February)
- Lord Lieutenant of Caernarvonshire – Peter Drummond-Burrell, 22nd Baron Willoughby de Eresby
- Lord Lieutenant of Cardiganshire – William Edward Powell
- Lord Lieutenant of Carmarthenshire – George Rice, 3rd Baron Dynevor
- Lord Lieutenant of Denbighshire – Robert Myddelton Biddulph
- Lord Lieutenant of Flintshire – Sir Stephen Glynne, 9th Baronet
- Lord Lieutenant of Glamorgan – John Crichton-Stuart, 2nd Marquess of Bute
- Lord Lieutenant of Merionethshire – Edward Lloyd-Mostyn, 2nd Baron Mostyn
- Lord Lieutenant of Monmouthshire – Capel Hanbury Leigh
- Lord Lieutenant of Montgomeryshire – Edward Herbert, 2nd Earl of Powis
- Lord Lieutenant of Pembrokeshire – Sir John Owen, 1st Baronet
- Lord Lieutenant of Radnorshire – John Walsh, 1st Baron Ormathwaite
- Bishop of Bangor – Christopher Bethell
- Bishop of Llandaff – Edward Copleston
- Bishop of St Asaph – Thomas Vowler Short
- Bishop of St Davids – Connop Thirlwall

== Events ==
- 14 January - All thirteen members of the Point of Ayr lifeboat crew are drowned when it capsizes off Rhyl.
- 8 April - John Jones (Shoni Sguborfawr) is transferred from Norfolk Island to Tasmania.
- In the UK general election:
  - Sir Thomas Frankland Lewis becomes MP for Radnor Boroughs.
  - Sir Stephen Glynne, 9th Baronet, loses his Flintshire seat to Edward Lloyd-Mostyn for the second time.
- 24 May - Five people are killed in the Dee bridge disaster, when Robert Stephenson's railway bridge on the Chester and Holyhead Railway at Chester collapses.
- 1 July - "Treachery of the Blue Books": Publication of a government report ("blue book") on education in Wales containing opinions hostile to Welsh culture.
- Prince Albert is unsuccessfully challenged for the chancellorship of the University of Cambridge by The Earl of Powis. The winning margin is less than 120 votes.
- Sir William Robert Grove is awarded the medal of the Royal Society.

== Arts and literature ==
=== New books ===
- Reports of the Commissioners of Inquiry into the state of education in Wales
- John Lloyd - Poems
- Morris Williams (Nicander) - Llyfr yr Homiliau

=== Music ===
- John Mills (Ieuan Glan Alarch) - Y Salmydd Eglwysig

== Births ==
- 13 January - Daniel James, hymn-writer (died 1920)
- 27 January - Owen Owens Roberts, choirmaster and conductor (died 1926)
- 9 February - Hugh Price Hughes, Methodist social reformer (died 1902)
- 22 April - Charles Henry Wynn, landowner (died 1911)
- 20 June - Evan Thomas Davies (Dyfrig), clergyman and author (died 1927)
- 10 July - Alfred Neobard Palmer, historian and ancient monuments inspector (died 1915)
- 12 September - John Crichton-Stuart, 3rd Marquess of Bute, Cardiff landowner (died 1900)
- 13 October - Owen Owen, draper (died 1910)
- 14 November - Roland Rogers, musician (died 1927)
- date unknown - Llewelyn Kenrick, footballer (died 1933)

== Deaths ==
- 13 February - Sharon Turner, historian, 78
- 16 February - Taliesin Williams, poet and author, son of Iolo Morganwg, 59
- 17 March - Sir Harford Jones Brydges, diplomat and author, 83
- 29 March - Humphrey Gwalchmai, Calvinistic Methodist leader, 59
- 7 June - David Mushet, Scottish metallurgist (in Monmouth), 74
- 27 September - Lucy Thomas, colliery owner ('The Mother of the Welsh Steam Coal Trade')
- 6 October - John Evans (Methodist), 68

== See also ==
- 1847 in Ireland
