= 1841 in Wales =

- Centuries: 17th; 18th; 19th; 20th; 21st
- Decades: 1820s; 1830s; 1840s; 1850s; 1860s
- See also: List of years in Wales; Timeline of Welsh history 1841 in The United Kingdom Scotland Elsewhere

This article is about the particular significance of the year 1841 to Wales and its people.

== Incumbents ==
- Lord Lieutenant of Anglesey – Henry Paget, 1st Marquess of Anglesey
- Lord Lieutenant of Brecknockshire – Penry Williams
- Lord Lieutenant of Caernarvonshire – Peter Drummond-Burrell, 22nd Baron Willoughby de Eresby
- Lord Lieutenant of Cardiganshire – William Edward Powell
- Lord Lieutenant of Carmarthenshire – George Rice, 3rd Baron Dynevor
- Lord Lieutenant of Denbighshire – Robert Myddelton Biddulph
- Lord Lieutenant of Flintshire – Robert Grosvenor, 1st Marquess of Westminster
- Lord Lieutenant of Glamorgan – John Crichton-Stuart, 2nd Marquess of Bute
- Lord Lieutenant of Merionethshire – Edward Lloyd-Mostyn, 2nd Baron Mostyn
- Lord Lieutenant of Monmouthshire – Capel Hanbury Leigh
- Lord Lieutenant of Montgomeryshire – Edward Herbert, 2nd Earl of Powis
- Lord Lieutenant of Pembrokeshire – Sir John Owen, 1st Baronet
- Lord Lieutenant of Radnorshire – George Rodney, 3rd Baron Rodney
- Bishop of Bangor – Christopher Bethell
- Bishop of Llandaff – Edward Copleston
- Bishop of St Asaph – William Carey
- Bishop of St Davids – Connop Thirlwall

== Events ==
- 19 February - The Governor Fenner, carrying emigrants to America, sinks off Holyhead after colliding with a steamer, with the loss of 123 lives.
- 9 March - The first known photograph is taken in Wales, of Margam Castle by Calvert Jones.
- 12 April - The Taff Vale Railway is extended to Merthyr Tydfil
- 26 July - The proprietors of The Skerries Lighthouse off Anglesey, the last privately owned light in the British Isles, are awarded £444,984 in compensation for its sale to Trinity House.
- 19 August - In the United Kingdom general election, William Edwards stands as a Chartist candidate in Monmouth Boroughs and becomes the only Parliamentary candidate in Wales, ever, not to win a single vote.
- 8 December - The month-old Albert Edward, eldest son of Queen Victoria of the United Kingdom, is created Prince of Wales by letters patent.
- date unknown
  - Founding of Bala-Bangor Congregational College.
  - Poor Law Amendment Act 1841 is passed, largely thanks to the efforts of Sir George Cornewall Lewis.
  - Mordecai Jones opens a brewery at Brecon.
  - The Brymbo ironworks are bought out of Chancery after a long period of litigation and reopened by a limited company.
  - Opening of Swansea Museum by the Royal Institution of South Wales.
  - Land is earmarked by Welsh immigrants in Ohio for the building of Tyn Rhos Chapel.

== Arts and literature ==
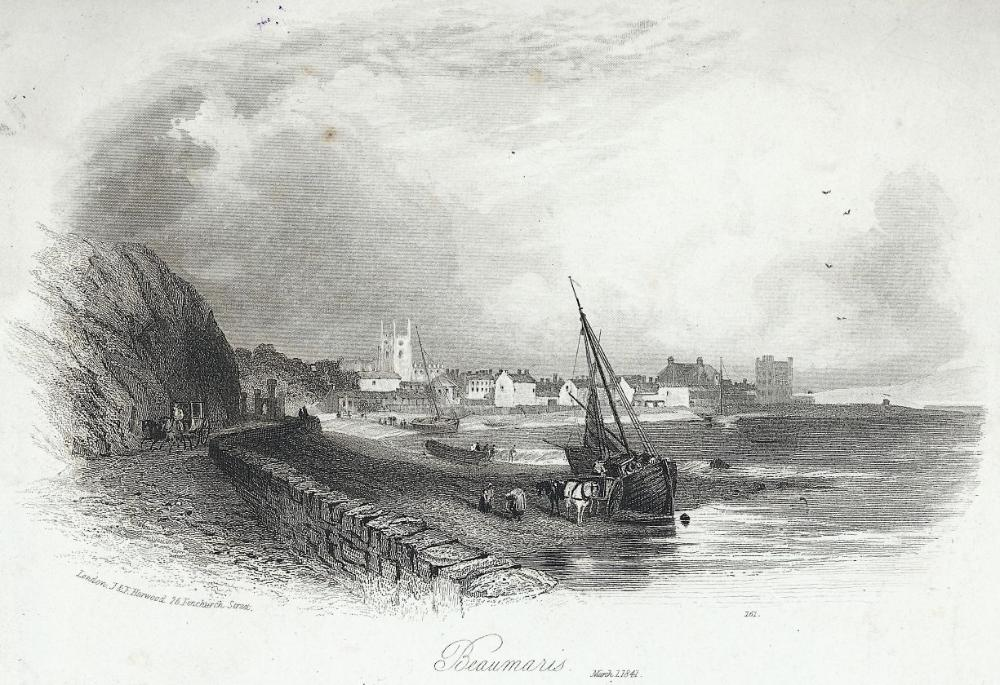
An engraving of Beaumaris made in 1841

=== New books ===
- David Owen (Brutus) - Gweithrediadau yr Eglwys Sefydledig
- Welsh Book of Common Prayer (new edition)

== Births ==
- 28 January - Sir Henry Morton Stanley, explorer (as John Rowlands; died 1904)
- 14 February
  - Sir John Gibson, journalist (died 1915)
  - William Reginald Herbert, horseman (died 1929)
- 5 April - Robert Rees, singer and musician (died 1892)
- 23 April - Henry Hughes, minister and historian (died 1924)
- 29 April - Francis Grenfell, 1st Baron Grenfell, soldier (died 1925)
- 21 May - Joseph Parry, composer (died 1903)
- 26 June (in London) - James Cholmeley Russell, railway entrepreneur (died 1912)
- 9 November (in London) - Edward Albert, Prince of Wales (later Edward VII of the United Kingdom (died 1910)

== Deaths ==
- 17 January - David Owen (Dewi Wyn o Eifion), poet, 56
- 12 May - Joseph Tudor Hughes, harpist, 13 (drowning)
- 1 May - David Jones, missionary, 44
- 24 May - Thomas Roberts, Llwyn'rhudol, co-founder of Cymdeithas y Gwyneddigion, 75-80
- 8 June - John Elias, preacher, 67
- 4 December - David Daniel Davis, physician, 64

== See also ==
- 1841 in Ireland
