= 1840 in Wales =

- Centuries: 17th; 18th; 19th; 20th; 21st
- Decades: 1820s; 1830s; 1840s; 1850s; 1860s
- See also: List of years in Wales; Timeline of Welsh history 1840 in The United Kingdom Scotland Elsewhere

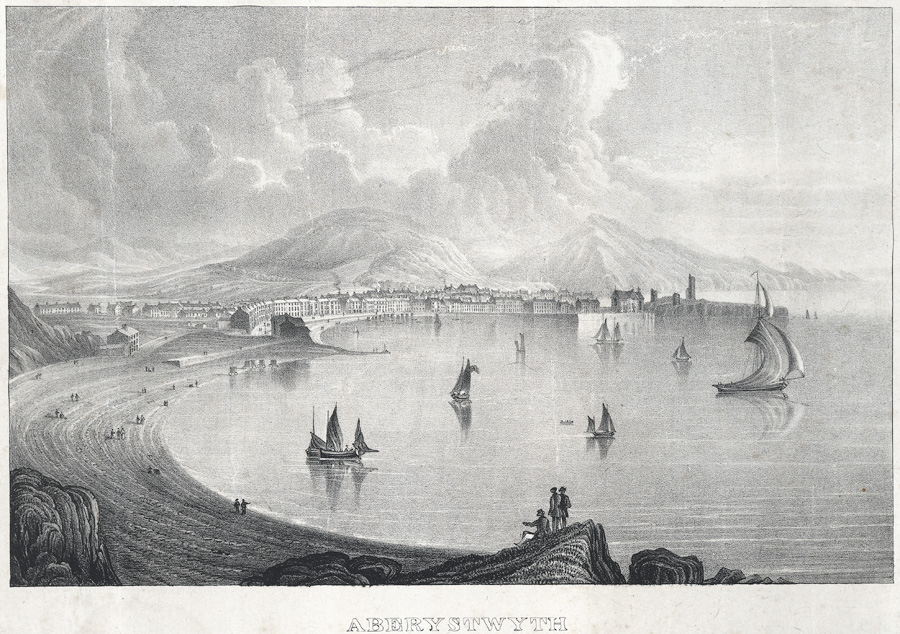
Aberystwyth of 1840

This article is about the particular significance of the year 1840 to Wales and its people.

== Incumbents ==
- Lord Lieutenant of Anglesey – Henry Paget, 1st Marquess of Anglesey
- Lord Lieutenant of Brecknockshire – Penry Williams
- Lord Lieutenant of Caernarvonshire – Peter Drummond-Burrell, 22nd Baron Willoughby de Eresby
- Lord Lieutenant of Cardiganshire – William Edward Powell
- Lord Lieutenant of Carmarthenshire – George Rice, 3rd Baron Dynevor
- Lord Lieutenant of Denbighshire – Sir Watkin Williams-Wynn, 5th Baronet (until 6 January); Robert Myddelton Biddulph (from 8 February)
- Lord Lieutenant of Flintshire – Robert Grosvenor, 1st Marquess of Westminster
- Lord Lieutenant of Glamorgan – John Crichton-Stuart, 2nd Marquess of Bute
- Lord Lieutenant of Merionethshire – Sir Watkin Williams-Wynn, 5th Baronet (until 6 January); Edward Lloyd-Mostyn, 2nd Baron Mostyn (from 25 January)
- Lord Lieutenant of Monmouthshire – Capel Hanbury Leigh
- Lord Lieutenant of Montgomeryshire – Edward Herbert, 2nd Earl of Powis
- Lord Lieutenant of Pembrokeshire – Sir John Owen, 1st Baronet
- Lord Lieutenant of Radnorshire – George Rodney, 3rd Baron Rodney
- Bishop of Bangor – Christopher Bethell
- Bishop of Llandaff – Edward Copleston
- Bishop of St Asaph – William Carey
- Bishop of St Davids – John Jenkinson (until 7 July); Connop Thirlwall (from 9 August)

== Events ==
- 1 January - Trial of Chartists John Frost, Zephaniah Williams and William Jones for their part in the Newport Rising of 1839 continues at Monmouth before Chief Justice Tindal. This is the first trial where proceedings are recorded in shorthand.
- 16 January - Frost, Williams and Jones are all found guilty of high treason for their part in the Chartist riots, and are sentenced to death - the last time the sentence of hanging, drawing and quartering is passed in the United Kingdom, although following a nationwide petitioning campaign and, extraordinarily, direct lobbying of the Home Secretary by the Lord Chief Justice, it is commuted to transportation for life (and Frost is much later pardoned).
- 5 June - Joseph Brown is appointed Vicar Apostolic of the Roman Catholic District of Wales, being consecrated as a bishop on 28 October.
- 8 October - Taff Vale Railway is officially opened, the first steam-worked passenger railway in Wales, running from Cardiff docks to Navigation House at Abercynon via the Cardiff station known in modern days as Queen Street. Public service begins the following day.
- 30 October - First branch of the Church of Jesus Christ of Latter-day Saints in Wales formed in Flintshire.
- 18 November - The paddle steamer City of Bristol is wrecked at Llangennith, Gower, drowning about 22 people.
- Approximate date - Rebuilding of Gregynog Hall with extensive use of concrete begins.

== Arts and literature ==
- An eisteddfod is held at Liverpool.

=== New books ===
==== English language ====
- Sir John Hanmer - Memorials of the Parish and Family of Hanmer
- William Lloyd - The Narrative of a Journey from Cawnpoor to the Boorendo Pass

=== Welsh language ===
- Evan Davies (Eta Delta) - Y Weinidogaeth a'r Eglwysi
- David Price (Dewi Dinorwig) - Y Catechism Cyntaf
- Taliesin Williams - Hynafiaeth ac Awdurdodaeth Coelbren y Beirdd

=== Music ===
- John Orlando Parry - Wanted: a Governess (opera)

== Births ==
- 7 February - Charles Warren, military and police officer and archaeologist (died 1927)
- 21 June - Sir John Rhŷs, educationist (died 1915)
- 16 September - Alfred Thomas, 1st Baron Pontypridd (died 1927)
- 29 November - Rhoda Broughton, novelist (died 1920)
- 3 December - Francis Kilvert, diarist (died 1879)
- 5 December - John E. Jones, Welsh-born governor of Nevada (died 1896)
- 17 December - Matthew Vaughan-Davies, 1st Baron Ystwyth, politician (died 1935)

== Deaths ==
- 6 January - Sir Watkin Williams-Wynn, 5th Baronet, politician and soldier, 67
- 17 March - William Williams of Wern, 58
- 19 May - John Blackwell (Alun), poet, 42?
- 7 July - John Jenkinson, Bishop of St Davids, 58
- 17 December - George Hay Dawkins-Pennant, politician, 76

== See also ==
- 1840 in Ireland
