= 1849 in Wales =

- Centuries: 17th; 18th; 19th; 20th; 21st
- Decades: 1820s; 1830s; 1840s; 1850s; 1860s
- See also: List of years in Wales; Timeline of Welsh history 1849 in The United Kingdom Scotland Elsewhere

This article is about the particular significance of the year 1849 to Wales and its people.

== Incumbents ==
- Lord Lieutenant of Anglesey – Henry Paget, 1st Marquess of Anglesey
- Lord Lieutenant of Brecknockshire – John Lloyd Vaughan Watkins
- Lord Lieutenant of Caernarvonshire – Peter Drummond-Burrell, 22nd Baron Willoughby de Eresby
- Lord Lieutenant of Cardiganshire – William Edward Powell
- Lord Lieutenant of Carmarthenshire – George Rice, 3rd Baron Dynevor
- Lord Lieutenant of Denbighshire – Robert Myddelton Biddulph
- Lord Lieutenant of Flintshire – Sir Stephen Glynne, 9th Baronet
- Lord Lieutenant of Glamorgan – Christopher Rice Mansel Talbot (from 4 May)
- Lord Lieutenant of Merionethshire – Edward Lloyd-Mostyn, 2nd Baron Mostyn
- Lord Lieutenant of Monmouthshire – Capel Hanbury Leigh
- Lord Lieutenant of Montgomeryshire – Charles Hanbury-Tracy, 1st Baron Sudeley
- Lord Lieutenant of Pembrokeshire – Sir John Owen, 1st Baronet
- Lord Lieutenant of Radnorshire – John Walsh, 1st Baron Ormathwaite
- Bishop of Bangor – Christopher Bethell
- Bishop of Llandaff – Edward Copleston (until 14 October); Alfred Ollivant (from 2 December)
- Bishop of St Asaph – Thomas Vowler Short
- Bishop of St Davids – Connop Thirlwall

== Events ==
- 2 January – Completion of both tubes of Robert Stephenson's Conwy Railway Bridge.
- 26 February – Halkyn-born Mormon missionary Dan Jones embarks with 249 Welsh converts to the Church of Jesus Christ of Latter-day Saints bound for Salt Lake City from Liverpool.
- 13 May – A case of cholera is recorded in Cardiff, the beginning of an outbreak that spreads to Merthyr, Dowlais and Aberdare, and kills 800 people.
- 20 June – First tube of Robert Stephenson's Britannia Bridge is floated into position on the Menai Strait.
- 10 August – Underground explosion at Lletty Shenkin colliery, Cwmbach, kills 52.
- 1 November – Alfred Ollivant becomes Bishop of Llandaff.
- 13 December – Foundation stone of Llandovery College is laid.
- A temperance festival is held at Carmarthen.

== Arts and literature ==
=== Awards ===
- David Griffith (Clwydfardd) is appointed official bard of the Aberffraw eisteddfod. Rowland Williams (Hwfa Môn) is also invested as a bard.

=== New books ===
==== English language ====
- Anne Beale – Traits and Stories of the Welsh Peasantry
- Lady Charlotte Guest concludes publication of her translation into English of the Mabinogion
- John Lloyd – The English Country Gentleman
- Samuel Lewis – Topographical Dictionary of Wales
- Thomas Stephens – The Literature of the Kymry

==== Welsh language ====
- Robert Elis (Cynddelw) – Yr Adgyfodiad
- Hugh Derfel Hughes – Y Gweithiwr Caniadgar
- Rowland Hughes – Cyfarchiad Caredig i rai newydd ddychwelyd
- John Jones (Talhaiarn) – Awdl y Greadigaeth

=== Music ===
- Haleliwia (hymns)

== Births ==
- 2 May – Charles James Jackson, businessman and collector (died 1923)
- 17 September – Robert Harris, painter (died 1919)

== Deaths ==
- 14 March – Old Bill Williams, Welsh-born mountain man, 62
- 14 August – Edward Copleston, Bishop of Llandaff, 73
- 16 September – Thomas Jones, missionary, 39
- 2 October – James Davies, schoolmaster, 83
- 2 November – Jacob Davies, missionary, 33
- 5 December – Walter Davies (Gwallter Mechain), poet, 88

== See also ==
- 1849 in Ireland
