= 1845 in Wales =

- Centuries: 17th; 18th; 19th; 20th; 21st
- Decades: 1820s; 1830s; 1840s; 1850s; 1860s
- See also: List of years in Wales; Timeline of Welsh history 1845 in The United Kingdom Scotland Elsewhere

This article is about the particular significance of the year 1845 to Wales and its people.

== Incumbents ==
- Lord Lieutenant of Anglesey – Henry Paget, 1st Marquess of Anglesey
- Lord Lieutenant of Brecknockshire – Penry Williams
- Lord Lieutenant of Caernarvonshire – Peter Drummond-Burrell, 22nd Baron Willoughby de Eresby
- Lord Lieutenant of Cardiganshire – William Edward Powell
- Lord Lieutenant of Carmarthenshire – George Rice, 3rd Baron Dynevor
- Lord Lieutenant of Denbighshire – Robert Myddelton Biddulph
- Lord Lieutenant of Flintshire – Robert Grosvenor, 1st Marquess of Westminster (until 17 January); Sir Stephen Glynne, 9th Baronet (from 25 April)
- Lord Lieutenant of Glamorgan – John Crichton-Stuart, 2nd Marquess of Bute
- Lord Lieutenant of Merionethshire – Edward Lloyd-Mostyn, 2nd Baron Mostyn
- Lord Lieutenant of Monmouthshire – Capel Hanbury Leigh
- Lord Lieutenant of Montgomeryshire – Edward Herbert, 2nd Earl of Powis
- Lord Lieutenant of Pembrokeshire – Sir John Owen, 1st Baronet
- Lord Lieutenant of Radnorshire – John Walsh, 1st Baron Ormathwaite
- Bishop of Bangor – Christopher Bethell
- Bishop of Llandaff – Edward Copleston
- Bishop of St Asaph – William Carey
- Bishop of St Davids – Connop Thirlwall (from 9 August)

== Events ==
- 1 March — Work begins on the construction of the Chester and Holyhead Railway; Robert Stephenson is chief engineer on the project.
- 2 August — 26 men are killed in a mining accident at Cwmbach, Aberdare.
- exact date unknown
  - Halkyn-born Mormon missionary Dan Jones returns to Wales from the United States to proselytise for the Church of Jesus Christ of Latter-day Saints.
  - Henry Hussey Vivian becomes manager of the Hafod Smelting Works.

== Arts and literature ==
=== Literature and new books ===
- 1 January – Lewis Edwards founds the periodical Y Traethodydd.
- The Welsh language periodical Y Trysorfa is founded.
- Thomas Gee inherits his father's printing business.
- Daniel Evans (Daniel Ddu o Geredigion) — Galar-Cerdd ar Farwolaeth William Bruce Knight, Deon Llandaf
- John Jones (Idrisyn) — Yr Esboniad Beirniadol
- John Mills (Ieuan Glan Alarch) — Y Beirniadur Cymreig
- Samuel Prideaux Tregelles — Hebrew Reading Lessons

=== Music ===
- Rosser Beynon — Telyn Seion
- Casgliad o Hymnau (hymns)
- John Ambrose Lloyd — Y Ganaan Glyd

=== Visual arts ===
- March — Thomas Brigstocke exhibits his painting of General Nott before Queen Victoria.
- Penry Williams paints the portrait of Lady Charlotte Guest.

== Births ==
- 1 January – Francis Jayne, Principal of St David's College, Lampeter, and Bishop of Chester (died 1921)
- 24 February – Sir Alfred Lewis Jones, shipping magnate (died 1909)
- 16 May – Amy Dillwyn, businesswoman and novelist (died 1935)
- 21 June – Samuel Griffith, Premier of Queensland (died 1920)
- 10 October – Timothy Richard, missionary (died 1919)

== Deaths ==
- 1 January – Sir William Nott, military leader, 62
- 17 January – Robert Grosvenor, 1st Marquess of Westminster, Lord Lieutenant of Flintshire, 77
- 26 January – Peter Jones (Pedr Fardd), poet, 69
- 12 April – John Nevill, 3rd Earl of Abergavenny, 55
- 8 August – William Bruce Knight, Dean of Llandaff, 59
- 16 October – Martha Llwyd, poet, 79
- 17 November – Sir Salusbury Pryce Humphreys, naval officer, 66

== See also ==
- 1845 in Ireland
