= 1837 in Wales =

- Centuries: 17th; 18th; 19th; 20th; 21st
- Decades: 1810s; 1820s; 1830s; 1840s; 1850s
- See also: List of years in Wales; Timeline of Welsh history 1837 in The United Kingdom Scotland Elsewhere

This article describes the significance of the year 1837 to Wales and its people.

== Incumbents ==
- Lord Lieutenant of Anglesey – Henry Paget, 1st Marquess of Anglesey
- Lord Lieutenant of Brecknockshire – Penry Williams
- Lord Lieutenant of Caernarvonshire – Peter Drummond-Burrell, 22nd Baron Willoughby de Eresby
- Lord Lieutenant of Cardiganshire – William Edward Powell
- Lord Lieutenant of Carmarthenshire – George Rice, 3rd Baron Dynevor
- Lord Lieutenant of Denbighshire – Sir Watkin Williams-Wynn, 5th Baronet
- Lord Lieutenant of Flintshire – Robert Grosvenor, 1st Marquess of Westminster
- Lord Lieutenant of Glamorgan – John Crichton-Stuart, 2nd Marquess of Bute
- Lord Lieutenant of Merionethshire – Sir Watkin Williams-Wynn, 5th Baronet
- Lord Lieutenant of Monmouthshire – Capel Hanbury Leigh
- Lord Lieutenant of Montgomeryshire – Edward Herbert, 2nd Earl of Powis
- Lord Lieutenant of Pembrokeshire – Sir John Owen, 1st Baronet
- Lord Lieutenant of Radnorshire – George Rodney, 3rd Baron Rodney
- Bishop of Bangor – Christopher Bethell
- Bishop of Llandaff – Edward Copleston
- Bishop of St Asaph – William Carey
- Bishop of St Davids – John Jenkinson

== Events ==
- 1 April – John Josiah Guest is elected the first chairman of the Merthyr "board of guardians", formed to obtain an act of Parliament for the incorporation of Merthyr.
- 10 May – 21 men are killed in a mining accident at Plas-yr-Argoed, Mold, Flintshire.
- July /August – In the United Kingdom general election:
  - Sir John Edwards, 1st Baronet, defeats Panton Corbett to win Montgomery for the Liberals for a second time.
  - Edwin Wyndham-Quin, 3rd Earl of Dunraven and Mount-Earl joins Christopher Rice Mansel Talbot as MP for Glamorganshire.
  - Sir Stephen Glynne, 9th Baronet, future brother-in-law of Gladstone, becomes MP for Flintshire.
  - William Bulkeley Hughes defeats Charles Henry Paget to win Caernarvon Boroughs for the Tories.
- date unknown
  - Chartist riots in Montgomeryshire.
  - George Rowland Edwards becomes secretary to Lord Clive.
  - Major reconstruction of Penrhyn Castle in north Wales by Thomas Hopper (architect) is largely completed.

== Arts and literature ==
- Henry Mark Anthony exhibits A view on the Rhaidha [sic] Glamorganshire at the Royal Academy.
- The Welsh Manuscripts Society is founded at Abergavenny.

=== New books ===
==== English language ====
- Charles James Apperley – The Chace, the Road, and the Turf
- Eliza Constantia Campbell – Tales about Wales

=== Music ===
- Robert Edwards – Caersalem (hymn tune), published in Peroriaeth Hyfryd

== Births ==
- 14 March – Thomas Meyrick, politician (d. 1921)
- 26 May – Henry Hicks, geologist (d. 1899)
- 3 August – Lewis Pugh Pugh, politician (d. 1908)
- 5 August – William Lewis, 1st Baron Merthyr, industrialist (d. 1914)
- 6 September – Henry Thomas Edwards, Dean of Bangor (d. 1884)
- 22 September – Thomas Charles Edwards, minister, writer and first principal of the University of Wales (d. 1900)
- 26 December – Sir William Boyd Dawkins, geologist (d. 1929)
- date unknown
  - John Griffiths, mathematician (d. 1916)
  - Octavius Vaughan Morgan, politician (d. 1896)
  - William Bowen Rowlands, politician (d. 1906)

== Deaths ==
- 31 January – John Rolls of The Hendre, English-born landowner, 60
- 19 February – Thomas Burgess, former Bishop of St David's, 80
- 27 September – William Pryce Cumby, Superintendent of Pembroke Dockyard, 66
- 20 November – John Edward Madocks, MP, 51

== See also ==
- 1837 in Ireland
