= 1839 in Wales =

- Centuries: 17th; 18th; 19th; 20th; 21st
- Decades: 1810s; 1820s; 1830s; 1840s; 1850s
- See also: List of years in Wales; Timeline of Welsh history 1839 in The United Kingdom Scotland Elsewhere

This article is about the particular significance of the year 1839 to Wales and its people.

== Incumbents ==
- Lord Lieutenant of Anglesey – Henry Paget, 1st Marquess of Anglesey
- Lord Lieutenant of Brecknockshire – Penry Williams
- Lord Lieutenant of Caernarvonshire – Peter Drummond-Burrell, 22nd Baron Willoughby de Eresby
- Lord Lieutenant of Cardiganshire – William Edward Powell
- Lord Lieutenant of Carmarthenshire – George Rice, 3rd Baron Dynevor
- Lord Lieutenant of Denbighshire – Sir Watkin Williams-Wynn, 5th Baronet
- Lord Lieutenant of Flintshire – Robert Grosvenor, 1st Marquess of Westminster
- Lord Lieutenant of Glamorgan – John Crichton-Stuart, 2nd Marquess of Bute
- Lord Lieutenant of Merionethshire – Sir Watkin Williams-Wynn, 5th Baronet
- Lord Lieutenant of Monmouthshire – Capel Hanbury Leigh
- Lord Lieutenant of Montgomeryshire – Edward Herbert, 2nd Earl of Powis
- Lord Lieutenant of Pembrokeshire – Sir John Owen, 1st Baronet
- Lord Lieutenant of Radnorshire – George Rodney, 3rd Baron Rodney
- Bishop of Bangor – Christopher Bethell
- Bishop of Llandaff – Edward Copleston
- Bishop of St Asaph – William Carey
- Bishop of St Davids – John Jenkinson

== Events ==
- March – John Frost, former mayor of Newport, is deprived of his position as a magistrate because of his Chartist sympathies.
- 30 April – Chartists riot in Llanidloes and seize control of the town for five days.
- 7 May – Henry Vincent is arrested after addressing a Chartist meeting and taken to prison at Monmouth.
- 13 May – Beginning of the Rebecca Riots.
- 25 July – William Ewart Gladstone marries Catherine Glynne of Hawarden.
- 28 August – Mary Anne Lewis, widow of Cardiff MP Wyndham Lewis, marries Benjamin Disraeli.
- 5 October – Opening of West Bute Dock.
- 4 November – Newport Rising: between 5,000 and 10,000 Chartist sympathisers led by John Frost, many of them coal miners, march on the Westgate Hotel in Newport, Monmouthshire, to liberate Chartist prisoners; around 22 are killed when troops, directed by Thomas Phillips, the mayor, fire on the crowd. This is the last large-scale armed civil rebellion against authority in mainland Britain and sees the most deaths.
- 23 November – Zephaniah Williams, one of the leaders of the Chartist march on Newport, is arrested on board ship at Cardiff.
- date unknown – Sir Thomas Frankland Lewis resigns as chairman of the Poor Law Commission, to be replaced by his son, George Cornewall Lewis.

== Arts and literature ==
=== New books ===
- William Bingley – Excursions in North Wales
- Maria James – Wales and other Poems
- William Williams (Caledfryn) – Drych Barddonol

=== Music ===
- John Roberts (Ieuan Gwyllt) – Hafilah (hymn tune)

== Births ==
- 9 January – Sarah Jane Rees (Cranogwen), writer (d. 1916)
- 13 February (in England) – Robert Bird, politician (d. 1909)
- 7 March (in Germany) – Ludwig Mond, German-born industrialist (d. 1909)
- 31 March – Thomas Henry Thomas (Arlunydd Penygarn) later known as T. H. Thomas, artist (d. 1915)
- 24 September (in England) – John Neale Dalton, royal chaplain and tutor (d. 1931)

== Deaths ==
- 27 January – Sir Charles Paget, MP for Caernarfon, 60 (yellow fever)
- 11 May – "Doctor" John Harries, Cwrt-y-cadno, physician, 54
- 16 May – Edward Clive, 1st Earl of Powis, 84
- 20 May – Rice Rees, historian, 35
- 29 December – Hopkin Bevan, minister and author, 74

== See also ==
- 1839 in Ireland
