= 1846 in Wales =

- Centuries: 17th; 18th; 19th; 20th; 21st
- Decades: 1820s; 1830s; 1840s; 1850s; 1860s
- See also: List of years in Wales; Timeline of Welsh history 1846 in The United Kingdom Scotland Elsewhere

This article is about the particular significance of the year 1846 to Wales and its people.

== Incumbents ==
- Lord Lieutenant of Anglesey – Henry Paget, 1st Marquess of Anglesey
- Lord Lieutenant of Brecknockshire – Penry Williams
- Lord Lieutenant of Caernarvonshire – Peter Drummond-Burrell, 22nd Baron Willoughby de Eresby
- Lord Lieutenant of Cardiganshire – William Edward Powell
- Lord Lieutenant of Carmarthenshire – George Rice, 3rd Baron Dynevor
- Lord Lieutenant of Denbighshire – Robert Myddelton Biddulph
- Lord Lieutenant of Flintshire – Sir Stephen Glynne, 9th Baronet
- Lord Lieutenant of Glamorgan – John Crichton-Stuart, 2nd Marquess of Bute
- Lord Lieutenant of Merionethshire – Edward Lloyd-Mostyn, 2nd Baron Mostyn
- Lord Lieutenant of Monmouthshire – Capel Hanbury Leigh
- Lord Lieutenant of Montgomeryshire – Edward Herbert, 2nd Earl of Powis
- Lord Lieutenant of Pembrokeshire – Sir John Owen, 1st Baronet
- Lord Lieutenant of Radnorshire – John Walsh, 1st Baron Ormathwaite
- Bishop of Bangor – Christopher Bethell
- Bishop of Llandaff – Edward Copleston
- Bishop of St Asaph – William Carey (until 13 September); Thomas Vowler Short (from 27 October)
- Bishop of St Davids – Connop Thirlwall (from 9 August)

== Events ==
- 14 January - 35 men are killed in a mining accident at Risca.
- March - A speech by William Williams, MP for Coventry, on the subject of education and the Welsh language leads to the commissioning of a report.
- 27 June - Thomas Frankland Lewis is created a baronet.
- 1 August - Opening of the Aberdare railway.
- 3 August - Mary Cornelia Edwards of Plas Machynlleth marries George Vane-Tempest, 5th Marquess of Londonderry.
- October - New bridge over the River Towy at Llandeilo collapses under construction.
- date unknown
  - The new cast-iron Llandinam Bridge in Montgomeryshire is opened.
  - The rebuilt Beaumaris Pier is partially opened.
  - Halkyn-born Mormon missionary Dan Jones becomes mission president of the Church of Jesus Christ of Latter-day Saints in Wales, concentrating the church's efforts around Merthyr Tydfil, publishing (from July) the Welsh language monthly Prophwyd y Jubili and also the tract Hanes Saint y Dyddiau Diweddaf.
  - The Cambrian Archaeological Association is founded by Harry Longueville Jones and John Williams (Ab Ithel) and launches its journal Archaeologia Cambrensis.

== Arts and literature ==
=== New books ===
- Griffith Edwards (Gutyn Padarn) - Gwaith Prydyddawl
- Daniel Silvan Evans - Telynegion
- Sir Samuel Rush Meyrick - Heraldic Visitations of Wales and Part of the Marches between the years 1586 and 1613...
- William Morgan (Gwilym Gelli-deg) - Cerbyd Awen

=== Music ===
- Y Salmydd Cenedlaethol (collection of hymns)

== Births ==
- 8 January - Henry Bracy, tenor (d. 1917)
- 1 October - John Cadvan Davies, minister and poet (d. 1823)
- 17 October - Mary Davies (Mair Eifion), poet (d. 1882)
- 24 November - Tom Hurry Riches, steam locomotive engineer (d. 1911)
- 6 December - James Charles, theologian (d. 1920)
- 28 December - William Frost, harpist (d. 1891)
- 3 August - Samuel M. Jones, mayor of Toledo, Ohio (d. 1904)

== Deaths ==
- 9 March - William Hughes, composer, 88
- 28 March - Daniel Evans (Daniel Ddu o Geredigion), poet, 53
- 26 June - Honoratus Leigh Thomas, surgeon, 77
- 29 July - John Owens, educational benefactor, 55
- 13 September – William Carey, Bishop of St Asaph, 76
- October - John Evans, surgeon and cartographer, 90
- 3 December - Daniel Jones, missionary, 33
- 5 December - Sir Charles Morgan, 2nd Baronet, politician, 86

== See also ==
- 1846 in Ireland
