= John R. Phillips =

John R. Phillips may refer to:

- John R. Phillips (attorney) (born 1942), American diplomat and attorney
- John R. Phillips (American politician), Republican United States congressman from California, 1943–1957
- John Roland Phillips (1844–1887), Welsh lawyer and antiquarian

== See also ==
- John Phillips (disambiguation)
