= 1849 in Scotland =

- Centuries: 17th; 18th; 19th; 20th; 21st
- Decades: 1820s; 1830s; 1840s; 1850s; 1860s
- See also: List of years in Scotland; Timeline of Scottish history 1849 in: The UK • Wales • Elsewhere

Events from the year 1849 in Scotland.

== Incumbents ==
=== Law officers ===
- Lord Advocate – Andrew Rutherfurd
- Solicitor General for Scotland – Thomas Maitland

=== Judiciary ===
- Lord President of the Court of Session and Lord Justice General – Lord Boyle
- Lord Justice Clerk – Lord Glencorse

== Events ==
- 19 February – Theatre Royal disaster: 65 people, almost all under the age of 20, are crushed to death in a panic caused by a small fire in the Theatre Royal, Dunlop Street, Glasgow.
- 16 July – Portpatrick to Donaghadee packet service withdrawn.
- 5 October – after three years construction, the Ardnamurchan Lighthouse oil light is first exhibited.
- 1 November – Buchanan Street railway station is opened in Glasgow by the Caledonian Railway.
- Birkhall is acquired by Albert, Prince Consort.
- Pollokshields is established as a Glasgow southside suburb by the Stirling-Maxwell family and set out or 'feued' by Edinburgh architect David Rhind.
- The drapers' store of Arthur & Fraser, predecessor of the House of Fraser, is established in Glasgow by Hugh Fraser and James Arthur.
- The construction of Cox Brothers' Camperdown Works in Lochee begins.

== Births ==
- 27 May – Catherine Cranston, tearoom proprietor (died 1934)
- 24 September – Cathcart William Methven, harbour engineer and painter (died 1925 in South Africa)
- 23 October – James Reid, physician (died 1923)
- 29 December – William Cunningham, economist and economic historian (died 1919)

== Deaths ==
- 5 March – David Scott, historical painter (born 1806)
- 3 July – Anthony Todd Thomson, physician and pioneer of dermatology (born 1778)

== See also ==
- Timeline of Scottish history
- 1849 in Ireland
