= Leslie Manfield =

Wales international rugby union footballer & DFC

Les Manfield
- Born: Leslie Manfield; 10 November 1915 Mountain Ash, Rhondda Cynon Taf, Wales
- Died: 2 November 2006 (aged 90) Mountain Ash, Rhondda Cynon Taf, Wales
- School: Mountain Ash County Intermediate School
- University: University College, Cardiff; Leeds Carnegie University
- Occupation: Teacher

Rugby union career
- Position: Number eight
Amateur team(s)
Years	Team	Apps	(Points)
- Mountain Ash RFC
–	Cardiff RFC		
–	Penarth RFC		
–	London Welsh RFC		
–	Otley R.U.F.C.		
–	Neath RFC		
–	Bridgend RFC		
–	Royal Air Force		
–	Combined Service		
–	Barbarian F.C.		
–	Yorkshire County		
International career
Years	Team	Apps	(Points)
1939–1948	Wales	7	(0)

Leslie Manfield DFC (10 November 1915 – 2 November 2006) was a Welsh rugby union international. He was the second oldest Welsh international of all time, and at the time of his death, aged 91, the oldest living man to have played as a forward for Wales.

== Rugby career ==
Manfield was born in Mountain Ash, the son of a railway worker, and went to school there. He played for the Welsh under-15 side on 1 March 1930 and played for Cardiff RFC. After studying physics and chemistry at University College Cardiff, he won his first senior international cap in 1939 against Scotland. He had been chosen as a trialist for England that year, following the award of a Yorkshire cap. When the Welsh selectors chose him for a Welsh trial, he chose Wales, being the country of his birth

Manfield played several internationals after World War II, one of only four men to have played for Wales both before and after the war. He retired from the international game at the age of 34, having won seven caps for his country, and taught at Mountain Ash Grammar School until forced to retire through ill-health. He died at Aberdare Hospital of complications after a fall.

=== International matches played ===
- Australia 1947
- England 1948
- France 1948
- Ireland 1939, 1948
- Scotland 1939, 1948

== Military career ==
With the outbreak of the Second World War all organised rugby was suspended. In 1940 Manfield volunteered for the Royal Air Force, and was sent to RAF training centres in Uxbridge and Cosford, training alongside soccer international George Male. After completing his training he was posted to St Athan near Cardiff before training as an air observer in Scotland. In 1942, now a flying officer, Manfield was posted to active service in Cairo and spent three years in the Middle East flying Wellingtons with 102 Squadron, rising to the rank of squadron leader . Manfield was hit by flak twice whilst flying over Tobruk. While navigating an SOE operation to Crete his plane crash landed in the sea after the engines failed. Manfield and three other crewmen survived at sea for two days before being picked up by a motor torpedo boat.

On 4 April 1943, Manfield was awarded the Distinguished Flying Cross for his work in a Special Operations Unit. He left 282 Wing Cairo in 1945 and returned to Britain as a course commander at the Empire Air Navigation School in Shawbury.
