= Edward Davis (sculptor) =

English sculptor

Edward Davis MIBS (1813 – 14 August 1878) was a 19th century British sculptor.

== Life ==
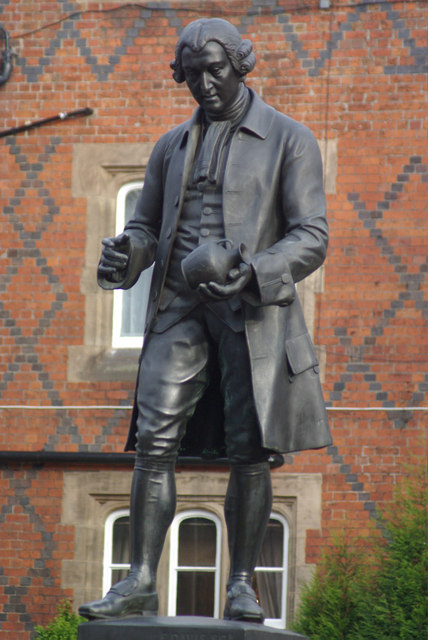
Davis' statue of Josiah Wedgwood in Stoke-on-Trent

He was born in London but his parents were from Carmarthen in south Wales.

He attended the Royal Academy Schools in London and trained in the studio of Edward Hodges Baily, and was possibly in the studio while he worked on the statue of Nelson for Nelson's Column. He exhibited at the Royal Academy from 1834 until 1877. He lived and worked in the Fitzroy Square area of London.

He died on 14 August 1878.

== Works ==
- Bust of Charles Kemble (1836) exhibited at RA
- Bust of William Tooke (1837) exhibited at Liverpool Academy of Arts
- Bust of David Salomons (1838) exhibited at RA
- Bust of F Raincock (1838) exhibited at Liverpool Academy of Arts
- Bust of Benjamin Aislabie (1838) at Marylebone Cricket Club
- Carvings on the front of the Old Adelphi Theatre, London (1840)
- Bust of the Duchess of Kent (1843) in the Royal Collection
- Statuary group "The Power of the Law" (1844) originally at Westminster Hall, moved to Assize Court in Cambridge
- Bust of Sir John Jervis (1849) Middle Temple London
- Bust of the Duke of Rutland (1850) in Belvoir Castle
- Statue of the Duke of Rutland for Leicester (1850)
- "Venus and Cupid" statuary displayed at the Great Exhibition 1851 moved to Salford Art Gallery
- Statue of Sir William Nott for Carmarthen (1851)
- "The Virgin and the Saviour" (1855)
- Bust of William Rathbone Lord Mayor of Liverpool (1857) in St George's Hall, Liverpool
- Bust of George James Guthrie (1857) in Royal College of Surgeons
- Statue of Josiah Wedgewood for Stoke-on-Trent (1860)
- "Rebecca at the Well" at International Exhibition 1862
- Bust of Dr Edmund Alexander Parkes (1862) at University College London
- Bust of Thomas Hood (1867) at Royal Society of London
- Bust of Daniel Maclise (1870) at Burlington House
- Bust of John Constable (1874) at Burlington House
- "Cupid and Physche" (1875)
- Bust of Connop Thirlwall, Bishop of St David's (1876) Westminster Abbey
- Bust of Sir Francis Ronalds (dnk) at Royal Society of London

=== Gallery ===
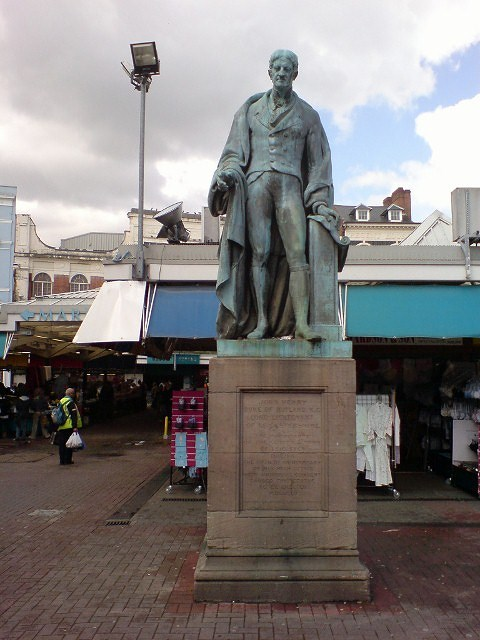
Statue of John Henry Manners, the Duke of Rutland in Leicester

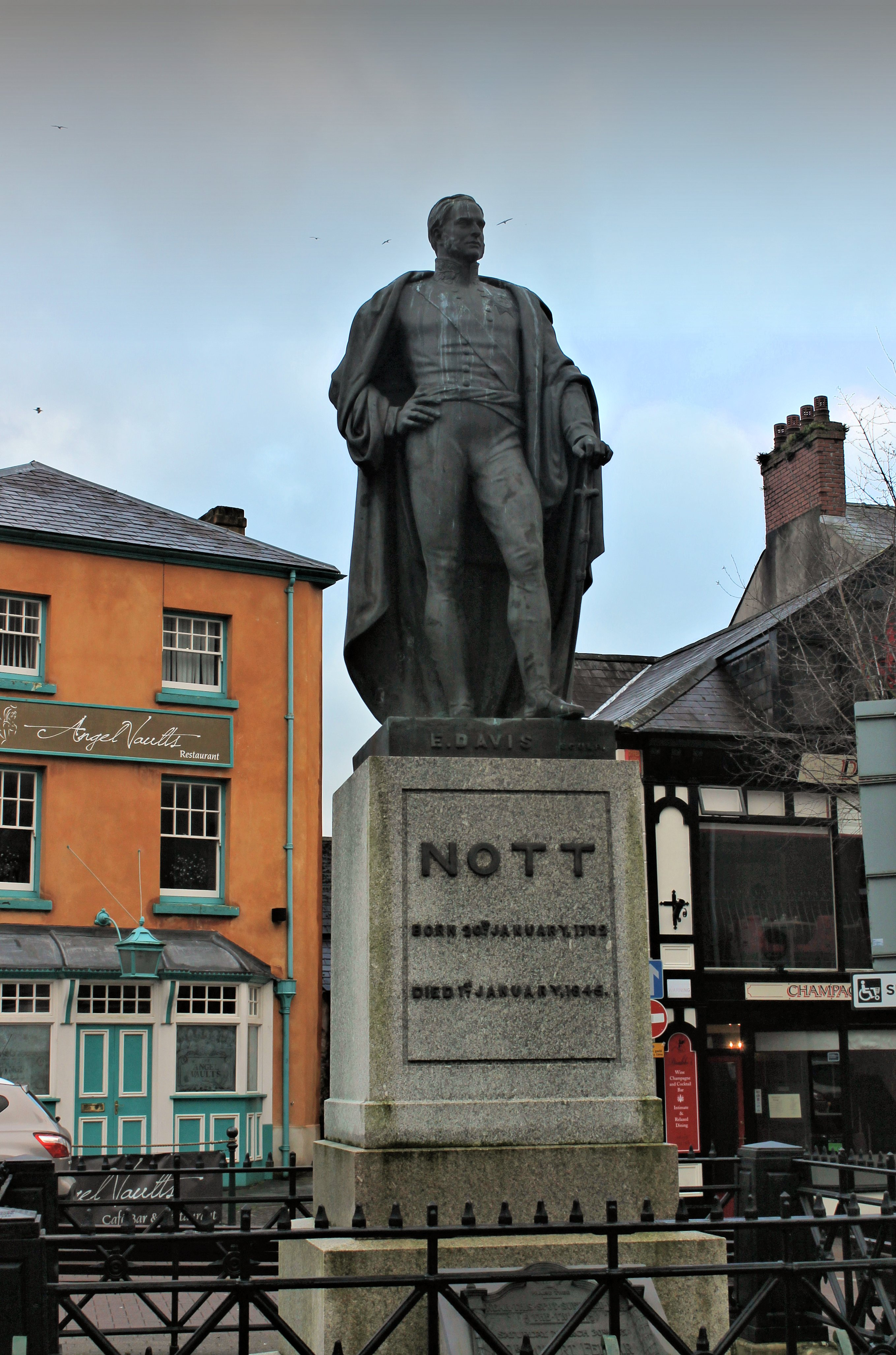
Statue of Sir William Nott in Nott Square in Carmarthen
