= List of years in Wales =

Indexes of individual years in Wales.

2020s – 2010s – 2000s – 1990s – 1980s – 1970s – 1960s – 1950s – 1940s – 1930s – 1920s – 1910s – 1900s – 1890s – 1880s – 1870s – 1860s – 1850s – 1840s – 1830s – 1820s – 1810s – 1800s – 1790s – 1780s – 1770s – 1760s – 1750s – 1740s – 1730s – 1720s – 1710s – Pre-1710

== 2020s ==
- 2029 in Wales –
- 2028 in Wales –
- 2027 in Wales –
- 2026 in Wales –
- 2025 in Wales –
- 2024 in Wales –
- 2023 in Wales –
- 2022 in Wales – 2022 Welsh local elections
- 2021 in Wales – 2021 Senedd election
- 2020 in Wales – Start of the COVID-19 pandemic in Wales

== 2010s ==
- 2019 in Wales – Cardiff City F.C.'s new signing, Emiliano Sala, is killed in a plane crash while returning to Wales from France.
- 2018 in Wales – Mark Drakeford replaces Carwyn Jones as First Minister.
- 2017 in Wales – June Osborne becomes the first female Bishop of Llandaff.
- 2016 in Wales – Ifor ap Glyn replaces Gillian Clarke as the National Poet of Wales.
- 2015 in Wales – The ferry service between Dún Laoghaire in Ireland and Holyhead ends after two centuries.
- 2014 in Wales – Wales win a record total of 36 medals at the Commonwealth Games in Glasgow.
- 2013 in Wales – A fire at the National Library of Wales causes some damage to the collection.
- 2012 in Wales – The Millennium Stadium hosts the opening event of the London Olympics in the football competition, with 11 matches being held in total.
- 2011 in Wales – The Welsh devolution referendum, 63.49% vote in favour of the Welsh Assembly able to make laws in areas it has powers for.
- 2010 in Wales – Wales hosts golf's Ryder Cup for the first time

== 2000s ==
- 2009 in Wales – Carwyn Jones takes over from Rhodri Morgan as First Minister of Wales
- 2008 in Wales – Resignation of Peter Hain as Secretary of State for Wales
- 2007 in Wales – Introduction of the legal ban on smoking in public places
- 2006 in Wales – The Queen opens the new Senedd building in Cardiff
- 2005 in Wales – Cardiff celebrates its centenary as a city (50 years as Welsh capital)
- 2004 in Wales – Wales Millennium Centre opens
- 2003 in Wales – Michael Howard becomes leader of the UK Conservative Party
- 2002 in Wales – Cowbridge businessman Peter Shaw is kidnapped in Georgia, but escapes after five months
- 2001 in Wales – Launch of the pressure group Cymuned
- 2000 in Wales – Wales child abuse scandal

== 1990s ==
- 1999 in Wales – First elections to the National Assembly for Wales
- 1998 in Wales – Alun Michael becomes Secretary of State for Wales
- 1997 in Wales – Referendum on devolution results in narrow "Yes" vote
- 1996 in Wales – Founding of the Owain Glyndwr Society
- 1995 in Wales – Disappearance of Richey Edwards
- 1994 in Wales – Tower Colliery is bought by its workforce
- 1993 in Wales – John Redwood makes an unsuccessful attempt to mime to the Welsh national anthem
- 1992 in Wales – Ebbw Vale Garden Festival
- 1991 in Wales – Four nights of rioting in Ely, Cardiff
- 1990 in Wales – Flooding in Towyn, north Wales

== 1980s ==
- 1989 in Wales – The Hippocratic oath is taken in Welsh for the first time
- 1988 in Wales – Steve Jones wins the New York Marathon
- 1987 in Wales – Ieuan Wyn Jones wins Ynys Môn
- 1986 in Wales – First Welsh Proms
- 1985 in Wales – The campaigning group Cefn is founded
- 1984 in Wales – Beginning of the miners' strike
- 1983 in Wales – Neil Kinnock becomes leader of the UK Labour Party
- 1982 in Wales – 32 Welsh Guardsmen are killed on Sir Galahad in the Falklands War
- 1981 in Wales – Charles, Prince of Wales marries Lady Diana Spencer
- 1980 in Wales – Campaigners force the government to honour its promise of a Welsh language fourth television channel

== 1970s ==
- 1979 in Wales – The Saint David's Day devolution referendum rejects the idea of a Welsh Assembly by four to one
- 1978 in Wales – Death of Sir Clough Williams-Ellis
- 1977 in Wales – Johnny Owen wins the British bantamweight boxing championship
- 1976 in Wales – InterCity 125 high-speed trains begin running between Swansea and Paddington
- 1975 in Wales – Opening of the Cleddau Bridge
- 1974 in Wales – Berwyn Mountain Incident
- 1973 in Wales – Completion of the Llyn Brianne dam
- 1972 in Wales – The Local Government Act 1972 transforms Wales into eight counties.
- 1971 in Wales – Ryan Davies and Ronnie Williams become household names when their show is transferred to BBC1
- 1970 in Wales – Bernice Rubens wins the Booker Prize

== 1960s ==
- 1969 in Wales – Investiture of Charles, Prince of Wales
- 1968 in Wales – First bilingual postage stamp
- 1967 in Wales – Welsh Language Act 1967
- 1966 in Wales – Aberfan disaster
- 1965 in Wales – Bryn Terfel born
- 1964 in Wales – The Welsh Office is established
- 1963 in Wales – First protest by Cymdeithas yr Iaith Gymraeg
- 1962 in Wales – Opening of Llanwern steelworks
- 1961 in Wales – Atlantic College founded
- 1960 in Wales – Ricky Valance becomes the first male Welsh singer to reach no.1 in the charts

== 1950s ==
- 1959 in Wales – Welsh flag given official status
- 1958 in Wales – Last execution in Wales
- 1957 in Wales – Passing of the Tryweryn Bill
- 1956 in Wales – First Welsh-medium secondary school
- 1955 in Wales – Cardiff becomes official capital
- 1954 in Wales – Opening of Cardiff Wales Airport
- 1953 in Wales – Queen Elizabeth II makes her first official visit to Wales as queen
- 1952 in Wales – Wenvoe television transmitter comes into service
- 1951 in Wales – Death of Ivor Novello
- 1950 in Wales – Dylan Thomas makes his first visit to America

== 1940s ==
- 1949 in Wales – Dylan Thomas settles at the Boat House in Laugharne.
- 1948 in Wales – Aneurin Bevan brings in the Acts of Parliament that create the welfare state
- 1947 in Wales – Wreck of the Samtampa
- 1946 in Wales – Coal Industry Nationalisation Act
- 1945 in Wales – Lloyd George is created an earl
- 1944 in Wales – Grace Williams writes Sea Sketches
- 1943 in Wales – Welsh National Opera is founded
- 1942 in Wales – Welsh Courts Act
- 1941 in Wales – How Green Was My Valley is filmed
- 1940 in Wales – The song "We'll Keep a Welcome" is first performed

== 1930s ==
- 1939 in Wales – The first wartime evacuees arrive in Wales
- 1938 in Wales – The Temple of Peace is opened in Cathays Park, Cardiff
- 1937 in Wales – Tommy Farr fights Joe Louis
- 1936 in Wales – Saunders Lewis and others are imprisoned for their sabotage attack on Penrhos aerodrome
- 1935 in Wales – Felinfoel Brewery starts selling canned beer
- 1934 in Wales – 265 miners are killed in the Gresford mining accident
- 1933 in Wales – Amy Johnson takes off from Pendine
- 1932 in Wales – Frank Brangwyn completes the Empire Panels
- 1931 in Wales – The Welsh School of Medicine is founded
- 1930 in Wales – The first youth hostel opens at Pennant Hall in the Conwy Valley

== 1920s ==
- 1929 in Wales – Megan Lloyd George becomes Wales's first female MP
- 1928 in Wales – Amelia Earhart lands in Wales after flying the Atlantic
- 1927 in Wales – Coleg Harlech is founded
- 1926 in Wales – Miners' strike leads to General Strike
- 1925 in Wales – Llyn Eigiau dam bursts, killing 16 people
- 1924 in Wales – Claude Friese-Greene travels through Wales
- 1923 in Wales – The Diocese of Swansea and Brecon is created
- 1922 in Wales – Urdd Gobaith Cymru is founded
- 1921 in Wales – The UK's first oil refinery opens at Llandarcy
- 1920 in Wales – Death of Sir Owen Morgan Edwards

== 1910s ==
- 1919 in Wales – Kinmel Park Riots
- 1918 in Wales – First woman parliamentary candidate in Wales
- 1917 in Wales – Death of Hedd Wyn
- 1916 in Wales – 38th (Welsh) Division in action at Mametz Wood
- 1915 in Wales – Publication of My People by Caradoc Evans
- 1914 in Wales – Welsh Home Rule Bill fails
- 1913 in Wales – 439 men killed at Senghenydd in the worst disaster in British mining history
- 1912 in Wales – National miners' strike
- 1911 in Wales – Investiture of the future Edward VIII of the United Kingdom as Prince of Wales
- 1910 in Wales – First general election in which all Welsh constituencies are contested

== 1900s ==
- 1909 in Wales – Record British monthly rainfall of 56.5 inches at Llyn Llydaw, Snowdonia
- 1908 in Wales – Strumble Head lighthouse built
- 1907 in Wales – King Edward VII lays foundation of Bangor University
- 1906 in Wales – no Conservative MPs in Wales
- 1905 in Wales – David Lloyd George joins the Cabinet
- 1904 in Wales – start of 1904-1905 Welsh Revival
- 1903 in Wales – Death of Dr Joseph Parry
- 1902 in Wales – Opening of Great Orme tramway
- 1901 in Wales – Prince George and Princess Mary become Prince and Princess of Wales
- 1900 in Wales – Keir Hardie becomes first Labour MP

== 1890s ==
- 1899 in Wales – First gramophone recording in the Welsh language
- 1898 in Wales – Peak year of slate production in Wales
- 1897 in Wales – Marconi makes the first radio transmission from Lavernock Point
- 1896 in Wales – Opening of the Snowdon Mountain Railway
- 1895 in Wales – Welsh Grand National held for the first time
- 1894 in Wales – 290 men killed in a mining disaster at Albion Colliery, Cilfynydd
- 1893 in Wales – Wales win the Triple Crown for the first time
- 1892 in Wales – The South Wales Argus is launched
- 1891 in Wales – Birth of Kate Roberts
- 1890 in Wales – David Lloyd George becomes MP for Caernarfon

== 1880s ==
- 1889 in Wales – Opening of Barry docks
- 1888 in Wales – Welsh Parliamentary Liberal Party is formed
- 1887 in Wales – Wreck of the Helvetia
- 1886 in Wales – Opening of Severn rail tunnel
- 1885 in Wales – Frances Hoggan is first woman doctor registered in Wales.
- 1884 in Wales – Opening of University of Wales, Bangor
- 1883 in Wales – Treorchy Male Voice Choir formed.
- 1882 in Wales – SA Brain & Company Ltd opens its brewery in Cardiff.
- 1881 in Wales – River Vyrnwy is dammed to create Lake Vyrnwy.
- 1880 in Wales – First "official" National Eisteddfod held at Caernarfon

== 1870s ==
- 1879 in Wales – Defence of Rorke's Drift by 139 South Wales Borderers
- 1878 in Wales – Gilchrist-Thomas method of steelmaking developed at Blaenavon; Prince of Wales Colliery disaster at Abercarn
- 1877 in Wales – First soccer Welsh Cup
- 1876 in Wales – Cardiff RFC plays its first match
- 1875 in Wales – Mining disasters at New Tredegar and Pentyrch
- 1874 in Wales – Opening of Powysland Museum, Welshpool
- 1873 in Wales – Work begins on the Severn rail tunnel
- 1872 in Wales – University of Wales, Aberystwyth, is founded
- 1871 in Wales – Miners' strike in South Wales
- 1870 in Wales – Francis Kilvert begins his diary

== 1860s ==
- 1869 in Wales
- 1868 in Wales
- 1867 in Wales
- 1866 in Wales
- 1865 in Wales
- 1864 in Wales
- 1863 in Wales
- 1862 in Wales
- 1861 in Wales
- 1860 in Wales

== 1850s ==
- 1859 in Wales
- 1858 in Wales
- 1857 in Wales
- 1856 in Wales
- 1855 in Wales
- 1854 in Wales
- 1853 in Wales
- 1852 in Wales
- 1851 in Wales
- 1850 in Wales

== 1840s ==
- 1849 in Wales
- 1848 in Wales
- 1847 in Wales
- 1846 in Wales
- 1845 in Wales
- 1844 in Wales
- 1843 in Wales
- 1842 in Wales
- 1841 in Wales
- 1840 in Wales

== 1830s ==
- 1839 in Wales
- 1838 in Wales
- 1837 in Wales
- 1836 in Wales
- 1835 in Wales
- 1834 in Wales
- 1833 in Wales
- 1832 in Wales
- 1831 in Wales
- 1830 in Wales

== 1820s ==
- 1829 in Wales
- 1828 in Wales
- 1827 in Wales
- 1826 in Wales
- 1825 in Wales
- 1824 in Wales
- 1823 in Wales
- 1822 in Wales
- 1821 in Wales
- 1820 in Wales

== 1810s ==
- 1819 in Wales
- 1818 in Wales
- 1817 in Wales
- 1816 in Wales
- 1815 in Wales
- 1814 in Wales
- 1813 in Wales
- 1812 in Wales
- 1811 in Wales
- 1810 in Wales

== 1800s ==
- 1809 in Wales
- 1808 in Wales
- 1807 in Wales
- 1806 in Wales
- 1805 in Wales
- 1804 in Wales
- 1803 in Wales
- 1802 in Wales
- 1801 in Wales
- 1800 in Wales

== 1790s ==
- 1799 in Wales
- 1798 in Wales
- 1797 in Wales
- 1796 in Wales
- 1795 in Wales
- 1794 in Wales
- 1793 in Wales
- 1792 in Wales
- 1791 in Wales
- 1790 in Wales

== 1780s ==
- 1789 in Wales
- 1788 in Wales
- 1787 in Wales
- 1786 in Wales
- 1785 in Wales
- 1784 in Wales
- 1783 in Wales
- 1782 in Wales
- 1781 in Wales
- 1780 in Wales

== 1770s ==
- 1779 in Wales
- 1778 in Wales
- 1777 in Wales
- 1776 in Wales
- 1775 in Wales
- 1774 in Wales
- 1773 in Wales
- 1772 in Wales
- 1771 in Wales
- 1770 in Wales

== 1760s ==
- 1769 in Wales
- 1768 in Wales
- 1767 in Wales
- 1766 in Wales
- 1765 in Wales
- 1764 in Wales
- 1763 in Wales
- 1762 in Wales
- 1761 in Wales
- 1760 in Wales

== 1750s ==
- 1759 in Wales
- 1758 in Wales
- 1757 in Wales
- 1756 in Wales
- 1755 in Wales
- 1754 in Wales
- 1753 in Wales
- 1752 in Wales
- 1751 in Wales
- 1750 in Wales

== 1740s ==
- 1749 in Wales
- 1748 in Wales
- 1747 in Wales
- 1746 in Wales
- 1745 in Wales
- 1744 in Wales
- 1743 in Wales
- 1742 in Wales
- 1741 in Wales
- 1740 in Wales

== 1730s ==
- 1739 in Wales
- 1738 in Wales
- 1737 in Wales
- 1736 in Wales
- 1735 in Wales
- 1734 in Wales
- 1733 in Wales
- 1732 in Wales
- 1731 in Wales
- 1730 in Wales

== 1720s ==
- 1729 in Wales
- 1728 in Wales
- 1727 in Wales
- 1726 in Wales
- 1725 in Wales
- 1724 in Wales
- 1723 in Wales
- 1722 in Wales
- 1721 in Wales
- 1720 in Wales

== 1710s ==
- 1719 in Wales
- 1718 in Wales
- 1717 in Wales
- 1716 in Wales
- 1715 in Wales
- 1714 in Wales
- 1713 in Wales
- 1712 in Wales
- 1711 in Wales
- 1710 in Wales

== Pre-1710 ==
- 1700s in Wales
- 17th century in Wales
- 16th century in Wales
- 15th century in Wales
- 14th century in Wales
- 13th century in Wales
- 12th century in Wales
- 11th century in Wales
- 10th century in Wales
- 9th century in Wales

== See also ==
- List of years in the United Kingdom
  - List of years in England
  - List of years in Northern Ireland
  - List of years in Scotland
- Timeline of Welsh history
