= 1915 in Wales =

- Centuries: 18th; 19th; 20th; 21st
- Decades: 1890s; 1900s; 1910s; 1920s; 1930s
- See also: List of years in Wales; Timeline of Welsh history 1915 in The United Kingdom Scotland Elsewhere

This article is about the particular significance of the year 1915 to Wales and its people.

== Incumbents ==
- Archdruid of the National Eisteddfod of Wales – Dyfed
- Lord Lieutenant of Anglesey – Sir Richard Henry Williams-Bulkeley, 12th Baronet
- Lord Lieutenant of Brecknockshire – Joseph Bailey, 2nd Baron Glanusk
- Lord Lieutenant of Caernarvonshire – John Ernest Greaves
- Lord Lieutenant of Cardiganshire – Herbert Davies-Evans
- Lord Lieutenant of Carmarthenshire – John William Gwynne Hughes
- Lord Lieutenant of Denbighshire – William Cornwallis-West
- Lord Lieutenant of Flintshire – William Glynne Charles Gladstone (until 13 April); Henry Gladstone, later Baron Gladstone (from 23 June)
- Lord Lieutenant of Glamorgan – Robert Windsor-Clive, 1st Earl of Plymouth
- Lord Lieutenant of Merionethshire – Sir Osmond Williams, 1st Baronet
- Lord Lieutenant of Monmouthshire – Ivor Herbert, 1st Baron Treowen
- Lord Lieutenant of Montgomeryshire – Sir Herbert Williams-Wynn, 7th Baronet
- Lord Lieutenant of Pembrokeshire – John Philipps, 1st Viscount St Davids
- Lord Lieutenant of Radnorshire – Powlett Milbank
- Bishop of Bangor – Watkin Williams
- Bishop of Llandaff – Joshua Pritchard Hughes
- Bishop of St Asaph – A. G. Edwards (later Archbishop of Wales)
- Bishop of St Davids – John Owen

== Events ==
- January - A memorial to Captain Robert Falcon Scott, in the form of a model lighthouse, is erected on an island in Roath Park Lake, commemorating the support given to Scott's expedition by the people of Cardiff.
- 26 February - The Welsh Guards regiment is created.
- 4 April - Three German prisoners-of-war escape from an internment camp at Llansannan in Denbighshire, but are quickly recaptured.
- 23 April - The body of Will Gladstone, recently killed at the Western Front, is re-buried in the churchyard of St Deiniol's, Hawarden, Flintshire, Wales. With special permission from King George V of the United Kingdom, he becomes the last casualty to be officially repatriated to the United Kingdom during the First World War.
- 25 April - At Gallipoli, Able Seaman William Charles Williams of Chepstow helps secure lighters on HMS River Clyde under continuous fire. He is posthumously awarded the Victoria Cross - the first such award made to a member of the Royal Navy in World War I.
- 7 May - When RMS Lusitania is sunk by a German torpedo, notable survivors include David Alfred Thomas, Viscount Rhondda and tenor Gwynn Parry Jones.
- 26 July - The Glamorganshire Canal closes between Abercynon and Pontypridd.
- 11 September - The first branch of the Women's Institute in Britain opens at Llanfair PG, Anglesey.
- 1 October - For his conduct at the Battle of Hooge, Lt. Rupert Price Hallowes of Port Talbot is posthumously awarded the Victoria Cross.
- November - The 38th (Welsh) Division is posted to France.
- 15 November - Sir James Cory, 1st Baronet, becomes MP for Cardiff, following the death in action of the previous incumbent, Lord Ninian Crichton-Stuart.
- 25 November - In the Merthyr Tydfil by-election, caused by the death of Keir Hardie, Charles Stanton becomes Independent Labour Party MP for Merthyr.
- 4 December - First submarine to be launched at Pembroke Dock, HMS J3.
- Welshmen continue to enlist for military service in World War I, including architect Percy Thomas, who joins the Artists' Rifles.
- Sir William Rice Edwards becomes surgeon-general of Bengal.

== Arts and literature ==
- August - Clough Williams-Ellis marries Amabel Strachey.
- unknown date - Gomer Berry and William Ewart Berry become owners of The Sunday Times.

=== Awards ===
- National Eisteddfod of Wales (held in Bangor)
- National Eisteddfod of Wales: Chair - T. H. Parry-Williams, "Eryri"
- National Eisteddfod of Wales: Crown - T. H. Parry-Williams

=== New books ===
==== English language ====
- Caradoc Evans - My People: Stories of the Peasantry of West Wales
- John Gwenogvryn Evans (ed.) - Poems from the Book of Taliesin, amended and translated
- Arthur Machen - The Great Return
- John Cowper Powys - Wood and Stone

==== Welsh language ====
- William Evans (Wil Ifan) - Dros y Nyth
- Eluned Morgan - Plant yr Haul

=== Music ===
- David Roberts - Y Tant Aur (2nd edition)
- William Penfro Rowlands - "Blaenwern" (hymn tune), in Henry H. Jones' Cân a Moliant

== Film ==
- The Birth of a Nation directed by Welsh-descended D. W. Griffith.

== Sport ==
- Boxing - Llew Edwards wins the British and Commonwealth featherweight titles.

== Births ==
- 16 January - David Michael Davies, 2nd Baron Davies (died 1944)
- 11 February - Mervyn Levy, artist (died 1996)
- 20 February - Mary Jones, actor (died 1990)
- 25 March - Dorothy Squires, singer (died 1998)
- 2 April - Patrick Gibbs, RAF Wing Commander, author and film critic (died 2008)
- 9 April - Bill Clement, Welsh international rugby player and Secretary of the WRU (died 2007)
- 13 May - Hrothgar John Habakkuk, economic historian (died 2002)
- 4 June - David Bell, writer and curator (died 1959)
- 1 July - Alun Lewis, poet (died on active service 1944)
- 3 July - Ifor Owen, illustrator (died 2007)
- 30 August - Lillian May Davies, later Princess Lilian, Duchess of Halland, fashion model and Swedish princess (died 2013)
- 4 September - Roland Mathias, poet and critic (died 2007)
- 10 September - Geraint Bowen, poet and Archdruid (died 2011)
- 22 September - Thomas Williams, politician (died 1986)
- 23 September - John Samuel Rowlands, GC (died 2006)
- 11 October - T. Llew Jones, writer (died 2009)
- 10 November - Leslie Manfield, Wales international rugby union player (died 2006)
- 26 December - Keidrych Rhys, poet and journalist (died 1987)

== Deaths ==
- 6 January - Owen Roberts, educator, 79
- 24 January - Charles Taylor, naval officer and Wales rugby international, 51 (killed in action)
- 30 January - Thomas Benbow Phillips, pioneer settler, 85
- 5 March - George "Honey Boy" Evans, musician and entertainer, 44 (cancer)
- 21 March - Edward Pegge, Wales international rugby player, 50
- 13 April - William Glynne Charles Gladstone, Lord Lieutenant of Flintshire, 29
- 25 April - William Charles Williams, posthumous Victoria Cross recipient, 34 (killed in action)
- 6 June - John Lloyd, political reformer, 81
- 31 July - Billy Geen, soldier and Wales international rugby union player, 24 (killed in action)
- 4 September - David Gwynne-Vaughan, botanist, 44
- 7 September - Robert Lewis-Lloyd, rower and barrister, High Sheriff of Radnorshire, 79
- 26 September - Keir Hardie, Scottish-born serving MP for Merthyr Tydfil (Labour) and pacifist, 59 (died in Scotland)
- 27 September - Richard Garnons Williams, soldier and Wales international rugby union player, 59 (killed in action)
- 30 September - Rupert Price Hallowes, posthumous Victoria Cross recipient, 34 (killed in action)
- 2 October - Lord Ninian Crichton-Stuart, Scottish-born British Army officer and serving MP for Cardiff (Unionist), 32 (killed in action)
- 22 November - Llewellyn John Montfort Bebb, Principal of St David's College, Lampeter, 53
- 29 November - Rachel Davies (Rahel o Fôn), Baptist preacher, 69
- 10 December - David Jenkins, composer, 66
- 17 December - Sir John Rhys, philologist, 75

== See also ==
- 1915 in Ireland
