= Margaret Townsend Jenkins =

Welsh-born social reformer and educator (1843–1923)

Margaret Townsend Jenkins (4 August 1843 – 4 June 1923) was a Welsh-born social reformer and educator in Chile and Canada.

== Early life ==
Margaret Townsend was born on 4 August 1843 in Neath, Wales, the daughter of Joseph Townsend, a church deacon.

== Career ==
Young Miss Townsend began working in the classroom at age 14, as a student teacher in Mumbles near Swansea. She left Great Britain in 1866 to marry her English fiancé, Mr. Fox, in a mining town at Coquimbo, Chile. She began an English-language school in Coquimbo to support herself and her four children after Fox died.

As Jenkins, she left South America for Canada in 1882. The combined Fox-Jenkins family settled in Victoria, British Columbia, where Margaret was a "prime mover" in social reform and cultural organizations including the Cymrhoddorian Society, the Women's Christian Temperance Union, and the Women's Canadian Club. She was the appointed temperance and suffrage organizer for Vancouver Island. In 1900, she became president of the Victoria chapter of the WCTU.

Margaret Jenkins was elected a trustee on the Victoria School Board in 1897 and 1898, and again for a term spanning 1902 to 1919. Under her guidance Victoria schools added a special day class for learning disabled students, and built a domestic science program. In 1914, a new elementary school was named for her, the first public building in Victoria named for a woman.

== Personal life ==
Margaret Townsend married twice, to Englishman Jonas Fox in 1866 and to Welsh shoemaker David Jenkins in 1879. She was widowed twice, in 1876 and 1904. She had four children in her first marriage, three in her second marriage, and raised nine Jenkins stepchildren as well. Margaret Townsend Jenkins died on 4 June 1923, aged 79. Her gravesite is in Ross Bay Cemetery.

One of her residences in Victoria is a designated heritage building. École Margaret Jenkins School in Victoria is now an English/French dual immersion school.
