= John Roland Phillips =

Welsh lawyer and antiquarian

- Born: June 1844; Cilgerran, Pembrokeshire
- Died: 3 June 1887 (aged 42–43); South Hampstead
- Occupations: Lawyer and antiquarian

John Roland Phillips (June 1844 – 3 June 1887) was a Welsh lawyer and antiquarian.

== Biography ==
Phillips was the only son of David Phillips of Cilgerran, Pembrokeshire, where he was born in June 1844. He received no regular education, but at an early age entered a solicitor's office in the neighbouring town of Cardigan. His legal studies led him to take a great interest in the history and antiquities of the district, and in August 1866 he won the prize offered at Cardigan Eisteddfod for the best essay on the ‘History of Cilgerran.’ The publication of the essay in an enlarged form early in 1867 (London) was followed by his settlement in London. He entered Lincoln's Inn in November 1867, and was called on 10 June 1870. Literary work still took up much of his time; he was employed by the Duke of Norfolk to put the Howard muniments in order; in 1874 appeared his ‘Memoirs of the Civil War in Wales and the Marches’ (London, Longmans), and, in conjunction with Mr. J. F. B. Firth, he was also employed in accumulating the evidence with regard to the history and management of the city companies which led to the appointment of the commission of 1880. He was the first secretary of the Cymrodorion Society, when revived in 1873. On the formation of West Ham as a separate police district, he was appointed (22 June 1881) its first stipendiary magistrate. To the second volume of Cobden Club essays on ‘Local Government and Taxation’ (1882), he contributed that on ‘Local Taxation in England and Wales.’ He died at South Hampstead on 3 June 1887, after a long illness.

Phillips's chief work is that on the civil war, which comprises one volume of narrative and another of illustrative documents. He also wrote an outline of the history of Glamorgan (privately printed), and a pamphlet on the Owens of Orielton, Pembrokeshire. His work was thorough, but of no marked originality.
