= Rosser Beynon =

Welsh musician (1811 -1876)

Rosser Beynon (1811 – 3 January 1876) was a Welsh musician. He was born in the Vale of Neath, Glamorganshire, shortly before his family moved to Merthyr Tydfil where for a few years he attended George Williams' school. At eight years of age, he left school and began work in a local iron-works. From a young age he attended the Soar Congregational Chapel, where he became a precentor in 1835 and ran a music class. He collected and wrote hymn tunes, twenty of these were published in Telyn Seion, a collection of hymn tunes and anthems. He died in January 1876 and was buried in Cefn cemetery, Merthyr Tydfil.
