= David Owen (Brutus) =

Welsh satirical writer (1795–1866)

David Owen (December 1795 - 16 January 1866) known by the pseudonym Brutus, was a Welsh satirical writer, editor and preacher.

He was born in Llanpumsaint, Carmarthenshire where he was brought up as a Congregationalist. Thereafter he spent periods of time in other parts working as a schoolmaster. After a troublous stretch working as a Baptist minister he turned his back on Nonconformity to join the Church of England, where he worked as editor of "Yr Haul", the magazine of what was then the Anglican Church in Wales. He published a number of books on religious matters, which became widely used. He also wrote sizeable autobiographies on the great Welsh Nonconformist preachers John Elias and Christmas Evans.

David Owen is buried in the churchyard of the small village of Llywel in Powys.
