= David Jenkins (composer) =

Welsh composer (1848–1915)

David Jenkins

David Jenkins (30 December 1848 – 10 December 1915) was a Welsh composer, best known for his choral works and hymn tunes.

Born at Trecastle near Brecon, Jenkins was apprenticed to a tailor at a young age, due to the death of his father. He did not take an interest in music until he was nine years old. At the time, Jenkins was a member of a choir which was to compete in a local Eisteddfod.

At age sixteen, his musical interest deepened and Jenkins began serious study of the Tonic-Solfa system. Two years later, he received an advanced certificate from the Tonic-Solfa college and began conducting his own choir. At age 20, Jenkins and his choir won a competition at Llanddeusant. He next turned his attention to the study of composition, harmony and counterpoint and was awarded a prize for the best anthem from the Tonic-Solfa college.

In 1874, he began studying music at Aberystwyth. By his second term, he had been awarded a three-year scholarship and became an assistant to Joseph Parry. Jenkins continued participating in various Eisteddfodau at home and abroad. He had won a prize at the Utica, New York Eistoddfod in 1873 and won a national prize at Pwllheli in 1875. Jenkins also continued composing and studying music. He was awarded the top prize in composing for his cantata Arch y Cyfamod at Carnarvon in 1876; the next year, Jenkins received a Bachelor of Music degree from Cambridge University.

Jenkins spent four months touring the United States in 1885; during that time he served as a conductor and as a judge at the various singing festivals. In 1893 he returned to Aberystwyth as a lecturer. Jenkins continued composing while at the university; composing an oratorio, Dewi Sant (Saint David), for the 1894 Eisteddfod at Carnarvon, and a cantata, The Psalm of Life for the 1895 Cardiff Triennial Festival. This work was performed by 2,000 voices at the Crystal Palace, London in the same year.

He continued his activities conducting choirs and serving as a judge at various Eisteddfodau; Jenkins also became a co-editor of the music journal Y Cerddor, sharing the duties with Emlyn Evans. He rose to Professor at Aberystwyth in 1910; retaining this position until his death in 1915.

== Works ==
- Arch y Cyfamod
- Job
- Yr Ystorm
- Dewi Sant
- The Psalm of Life (1895)
