= Charles James Apperley =

Welsh sportsman and writer

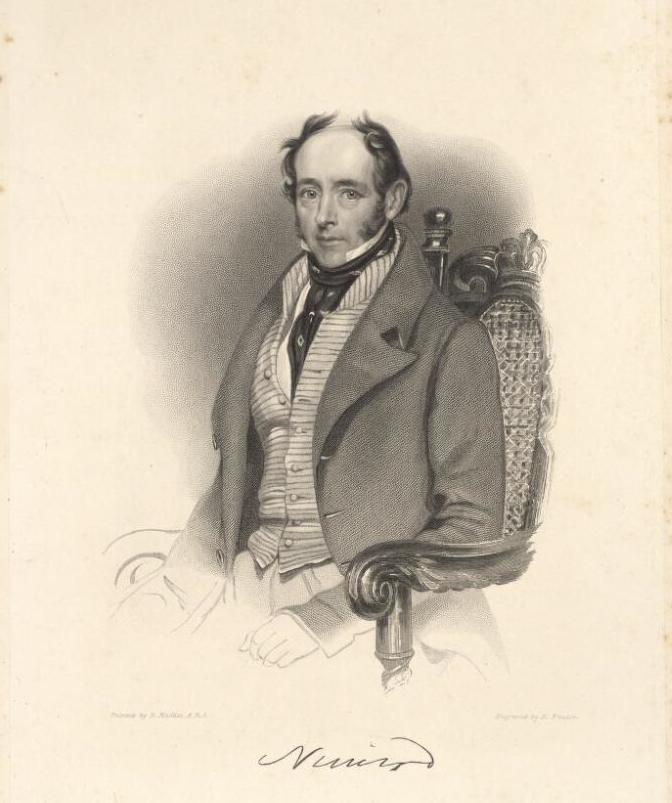
Charles James Apperley

Charles James Apperley (1777 – 19 May 1843), Welsh sportsman and sporting writer from an English family, and often resident in both countries, better known as Nimrod, the pseudonym under which he published his works on the chase and on the turf, was born at Plasgronow, near Wrexham, in Denbighshire, Wales in 1777.

== Youth ==
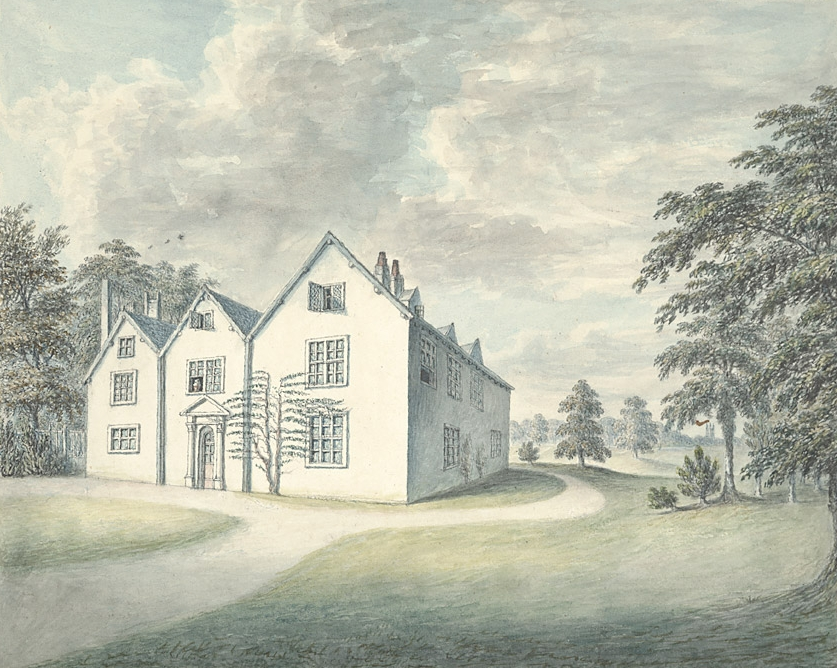
Plas Gronow

Charles James Apperley was the second son of Thomas Apperley, of Wootton House, Gloucestershire, but is stated to have been born near Wrexham during 1778. Apperley was educated at Rugby School before joining the Ancient British Light Dragoons in 1798. He served with the regiment in Ireland during the rebellion that year, and in 1801 married Winifred Wynn of Peniarth, daughter of a Caernarvonshire landowner. He settled in Warwickshire, where he devoted himself to the pleasures of the Chase.

== Sporting activities and literary career ==
Between the years 1805 and 1820 Apperley devoted himself to fox-hunting. From 1813 to 1819 he was the agent for his brother-in-law's estates and lived at Tŷ Gwyn, Llanbeblig. Around 1821, under the pseudonym of "Nimrod", Apperley began to contribute a series of articles to The Sporting Magazine that covered horse races, hunt meets and other sporting events. His references to the personalities of the people he knew or met at such events helped to double the circulation of the magazine within a few years. Mr. Pittman, the proprietor of The Sporting Magazine, gave Nimrod a handsome salary and defrayed all the expenses of his tours. He also gave Nimrod a stud of hunters. After Pittman's death, the proprietors of the magazine sued Apperley for the money that had been advanced. To avoid imprisonment, Apperley moved to Calais in 1830, where he supported himself by writing. Apperley is best known for the two books, The Life of a Sportsman, and Memoirs of the Life of John Mytton, both of which were illustrated with coloured engravings by Henry Thomas Alken.

Apperley eventually returned to England and died in Upper Belgrave Place, London, on 19 May 1843.

== Works ==
- Nimrods German Tour (1828) (first edition of Nimrods German Tour from Sporting Magazine in 1829–1830. Publishing company:Godewind Verlag, Germany 2006.) ISBN 978-3-939198-70-3
- Remarks on the Condition of Hunters, the Choice of Horses, and their management (1831)
- Nimrod's Hunting Tours, interspersed with characteristic ... (1835)
- The Chase, the Turf, and the Road (originally written for Quarterly Review), (1837)
- Memoirs of the Life of the Late John Mytton (1837)
- Nimrod's Northern Tour (1838)
- Nimrod Abroad (1842)
- The Horse and the Hound (a reprint from the seventh edition of the Encyclopædia Britannica) (1842)
- Hunting Reminiscences (1843)
- Nimrod's Hunting Tour in Scotland and the North of England (1874)

== See also ==
- The Sporting Magazine
