= Anne Beale =

English novelist and poet (1816–1900)

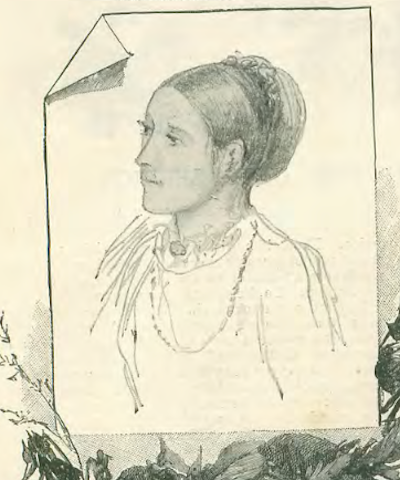
Anne Beale (1816–1900), as depicted in a 1901 issue of Girls' Own Paper

Anne Beale (1815 – 17 April 1900) was a popular English novelist and poet based in Wales. Her poetry, novels and stories appeared in print for over 50 years in her lifetime: "an unusually long career as an author". She was born and educated in Somerset and started a career as a governess. In 1841, she settled in Carmarthenshire. She started writing to supplement her teaching income, but she later earned enough to write full time.

== Biography ==
Anne Beale was born at Portfield, near Langport, Somerset and baptised at St Andrews Church, Curry Rivel on 14 October 1815. Her father, Thomas Beale, lived at Portfield Farm. She was educated at Bath, Somerset by "Madame de Bellecour". Her older sister Elizabeth Compton Beale was a singer by training.

Beale lived near Llandeilo in Carmarthenshire from 1841, at first working as a governess for the family of an Anglican clergyman. Her income from writing eventually allowed her to make it her full-time profession, instead of a supplement to her teaching income. Late in life she moved to London, where she died at 68 Belsize Road, South Hampstead, in April 1900. As well as her girls' stories and a volume of poetry, she contributed Welsh-interest articles and poems to English and Scottish magazines.

== Reception ==
Her depictions of Wales and the Welsh were admired for their sympathy and attention to detail. An 1869 review of Country Courtships in the Welsh newspaper The Welshman reported: "She knows the country well, and her descriptions of its scenery, its institutions, its people are severely truthful but, at the same time, so skilfully done, and with so much warmth and character as to captivate every person who cares to read one of the best and ablest novels of the season."

However, a review of the novel Simplicity and Fascination (1855) by the newspaper San Francisco Chronicle in 1893 called it "old-fashioned... bulky, verbose, full of stilted dialogue and verbose explanations."

== Selected works ==
- Traits and Stories of the Welsh Peasantry (1849)
- The Baronet's Family (1852)
- Simplicity and Fascination (1855)
- Gladys the Reaper (1860)
- Nothing Venture, Nothing Have (1864)
- Rose Mervyn of Whitelake (1879)
- The Queen O'the May (1881)
- The Pennant Family (1885)
- Courtleroy (1887)
- Old Gwen (1888)
- Charlie is My Darling (1891)

Gladys of Harlech (1858) and Country Landlords (1860) are both frequently attributed to Anne Beale, but the title page of the original edition gives the author's name as "L.M.S": its true author was Louisa Matilda Spooner.
