= Morris Williams =

Morris Williams may refer to:

- Morris Williams (writer) (1809–1874), Welsh clergyman and writer
- Morris Williams (politician) (1924–1995), Australian politician
- Morris Williams (baseball), American Negro league pitcher in the 1920s
- Morris Meredith Williams (1881–1973), British painter and illustrator

== See also ==
- Maurice Williams (disambiguation)
