= Connop Thirlwall =

British bishop and historian (1797–1875)

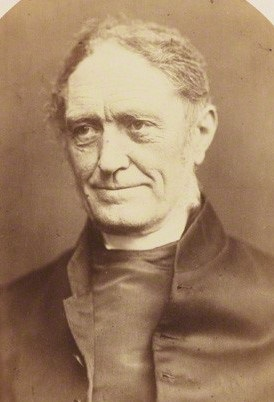
Connop Thirlwall

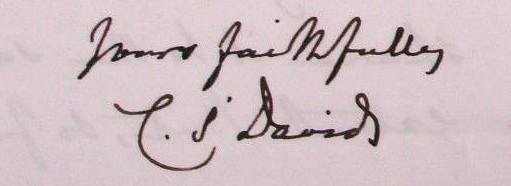
Connop Thirlwall - signature.

Connop Thirlwall (11 January 1797 – 27 July 1875) was an English churchman, who served as Bishop of St David's in Wales from 1840 to 1874. A noted scholar of history and literature, he is known for pioneering the concept of dramatic irony in the context of studying the ancient Greek tragedian Sophocles.

== Early life ==
Thirlwall was born at Stepney, London, to Thomas and Susannah Thirlwall. His father was an Anglican priest who claimed descent from a Northumbrian family, served for some years as chaplain to Bishop Thomas Percy before becoming rector of Bowers Gifford in Essex in 1814. The young Connop was a prodigy, learning Latin at three, Greek at four, and writing sermons at seven.

He went to Charterhouse School, where George Grote and Julius Hare were among his schoolfellows. He went up to Trinity College, Cambridge, in October 1814. gained the Craven university scholarship and the chancellor's classical medal and served as Secretary of the Cambridge Union Society in the Lent term, 1817. In October 1818 he was elected to a fellowship, and went for a year's travel on the Continent. In Rome he made friends with Christian Charles Josias Bunsen, which had a most important influence on his life. On his return, "distrust of his own resolutions and convictions" led him to abandon for the time his intention of being a clergyman, and he settled down to study law, though he did not lose interest in other subjects. In the meantime, he took on the task of translating and prefacing Friedrich Daniel Ernst Schleiermacher's essay on the Gospel of St Luke. He further rendered two of Johann Ludwig Tieck's most recent Novellen into English. In 1827 he made up his mind to finish with law, and was ordained deacon the same year.

Thirlwall now joined Hare in translating Niebuhr's History of Rome; the first volume appeared in 1828. The translation was attacked in the Quarterly as favourable to scepticism, and the translators jointly replied. In 1831 they established the Philological Museum, which lasted only six numbers. Among Thirlwall's contributions was his masterly paper On the Irony of Sophocles, which pioneered the concept of dramatic irony.

On Hare's departure from Cambridge in 1832, Thirlwall became assistant college tutor, which led him to join in the great controversy upon the admission of Dissenters which arose in 1834. Thomas Turton, the regius professor of divinity (afterwards dean of Westminster and bishop of Ely), had written a pamphlet objecting to the admission. Thirlwall replied by pointing out that no provision for theological instruction was made by the colleges except compulsory attendance at chapel. This attack on a time-hallowed piece of college discipline brought a demand for his resignation as assistant tutor. He complied at once; his friends thought that he ought to have sat it out.

The event marked him out for promotion by a Liberal Government, and in the autumn he received from Lord Brougham as chancellor the living of Kirby Underdale in Yorkshire.

== History of Greece ==
Though devoted to his parochial duties, he found time to begin his principal work, the History of Greece. This work was a commission from Dionysius Lardner's Cabinet Cyclopaedia, and was originally intended to be condensed into two or three duodecimo volumes. The scale was enlarged, but Thirlwall always felt cramped. Compared with Grote's history it lacks enthusiasm for a definite political ideal and is written entirely from the standpoint of a scholar. It shows a more impartial treatment of the evidence, especially in respect of the aristocratic and absolute governments of Greece. For these reasons its popularity was not so immediate as that of Grote's work, but its substantial merits were later recognised. A letter from Thirlwall to Grote, and Grote's generous reply, are published in the life of the latter. John Sterling pronounced Thirlwall "a writer as great as Thucydides and Tacitus, and with far more knowledge than they." The first volume was published in 1835, the last in 1847.

== Bishop of St David's ==
In 1837, Thirlwall was proposed as bishop of Norwich but his appointment was opposed by both King William IV and William Howley, the Archbishop of Canterbury, due to his liberal views.

In 1840 Thirlwall was raised to the see of St David's. The promotion was entirely the act of Prime Minister Lord Melbourne, an amateur in theology, who had read Thirlwall's introduction to Schleiermacher, and satisfied himself of the propriety of the appointment. "I don't intend to make a heterodox bishop if I know it," he said. In most essential points he was a model bishop, and he acquainted himself with Welsh, so as to preach and conduct services in that language. He was also the first bishop of St David's to be enthroned in person for many years.

His clergy often didn't see eye to eye with him. There existed eleven charges in which he from time to time reviewed the position of the English Church with reference to whatever might be the most pressing question of the day.

His attempts to allay ecclesiastical panic, and to promote liberality of spirit, required no ordinary moral courage. He was one of four prelates who refused to prevent Bishop Colenso from preaching in their dioceses, and the only one who withheld his signature from the addresses calling upon Colenso to resign his see. He took the liberal side in the questions of Maynooth, of the admission of Jews to parliament, of the Gorham case, and of the educational conscience clause.

He was the only bishop who voted for the disestablishment of the Irish Church, though a scheme of concurrent endowment would have been much more agreeable to him. He would have made an admirable successor to Howley in the primacy, but such was the complexion of ecclesiastical politics that the elevation of the most impartial prelate of his day would have been resented as a piece of party spirit.

== Character ==
Thirlwall's private life was happy and busy. Though never married, he was fond of children and of all weak things except weak-minded clergymen. He had a very judicial mind, and John Stuart Mill said he was the best orator he had ever heard. During his latter years he took great interest in the revision of the authorised version of the Bible, and was chairman of the revisers of the Old Testament.

He resigned his see in May 1874, and retired to Bath, where he died. He was buried in Westminster Abbey in the same grave as Grote. His bust on his monument was sculpted by Edward Davis.

According to the Encyclopædia Britannica Eleventh Edition, as scholar, critic and ecclesiastical statesman Thirlwall stood very high. He was not a great original thinker; he lacked the creative faculty and the creative impulse. His character, with its mixture of greatness and gentleness, was thus read by Carlyle: "A right solid, honest-hearted man, full of knowledge and sense, and, in spite of his positive temper, almost timid."

== Principal works ==
- History of Greece. 8 vols. London: Printed for Longman, Rees, Orme, Brown, Green & Longman and John Taylor, 1835–1844; 1852 edition
- Remains Literary and Theological, ed. J. J. S. Perowne. 3 vols. London: Daldy, Isbister, 1877–78 (Vols. 1–2: Charges, 1877;Vol. 3: Essays, speeches, sermons, etc., 1878.)

== See also ==
- Thirlwall Prize

== Sources ==
- Brinkley, Richard (1976). "Connop Thirlwall, Bishop of St David's" (PDF). Ceredigion. 7 (2): 131–51.
- Clark, John Willis (1898). "Thirlwall, Connop" . In Lee, Sidney (ed.). Dictionary of National Biography. Vol. 56. London: Smith, Elder & Co.
- Clark, J. W.; Matthew, H. C. G. "Thirlwall, (Newell) Connop (1797–1875)". Oxford Dictionary of National Biography (online ed.). Oxford University Press. doi:10.1093/ref:odnb/27185. (Subscription, Wikipedia Library access or UK public library membership required.)
- Cousin, John William (1910), "Thirwall, Connop", A Short Biographical Dictionary of English Literature, London: J. M. Dent & Sons – via Wikisource
- Kirkwood, Gordon MacDonald (1994). A Study of Sophoclean Drama. Cornell University Press. ISBN 0-8014-8241-0.

Church in Wales titles
Preceded by John Jenkinson	Bishop of St David's; 1840–1874	Succeeded by William Basil Jones
