= Sir John Owen, 1st Baronet =

British politician (1776–1861)

Sir John Owen Bt.
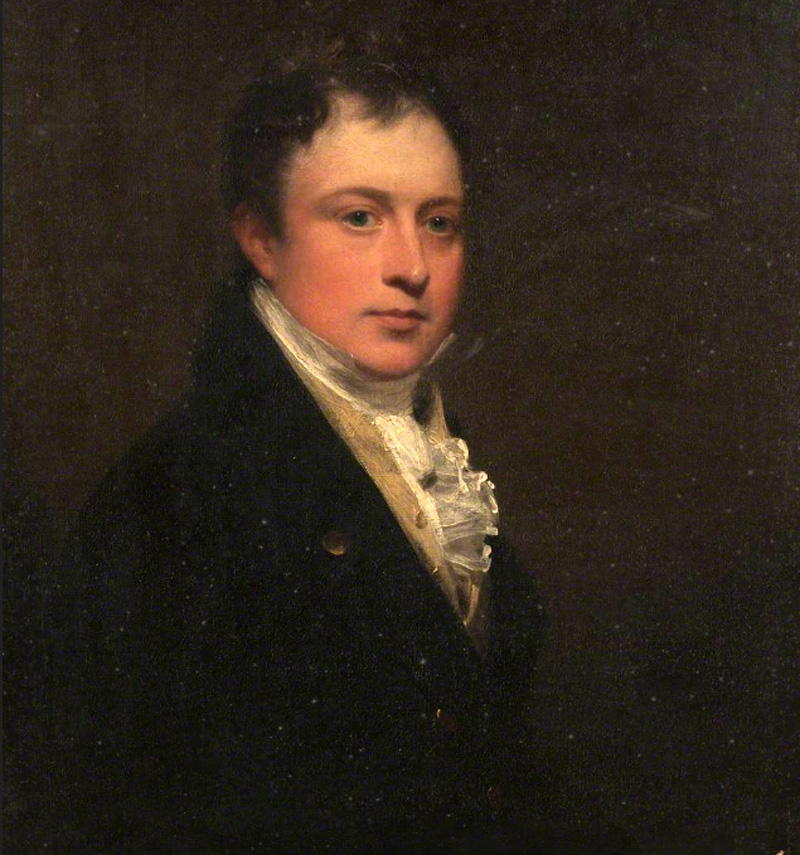

Lord Lieutenant of Pembrokeshire
- In office 1 January 1824 – 6 February 1861
- Preceded by: Richard Philipps
- Succeeded by: William Edwardes

Member of Parliament for Pembroke
- In office 3 July 1841 – 6 February 1861
- Preceded by: James Graham
- Succeeded by: Hugh Owen Owen
- In office 1809–1812
- Preceded by: Hugh Owen
- Succeeded by: Thomas Picton

Member of Parliament for Pembrokeshire
- In office 1812–1841
- Preceded by: Richard Philipps
- Succeeded by: John Campbell

Personal details
- Born: John Lord; 1776 Pembroke, Wales
- Died: 6 February 1861 (aged 84) Gloucester, England
- Party: Tory/Conservative
- Spouse(s): Charlotte Philipps; Mary Frances Stephenson
- Education: Christ Church, Oxford

Sir John Owen, 1st Baronet (1776 – 6 February 1861), born John Lord, was a British Tory (later Conservative Party) politician from Wales. He sat as a Member of Parliament (MP) for over fifty years. His wealth came from coal mining but he lost most of his fortune as a result of costly electoral campaigns in Pembrokeshire, most notably those of 1831.

== Early life ==
Born in 1776, the son of Joseph Lord and Corbetta Owen, grand-daughter of Sir Arthur Owen, third baronet of Orielton, Owen was educated at Eton and Christ Church, Oxford. He was married at Gretna Green in 1800 to Charlotte, daughter of the Rev. John Lewes Philipps of Llwyncrwn, Llangynin. There was one son and four daughters, namely:

- Hugh Owen Owen, who later inherited the baronetcy
- Charlotte Owen, who was married in 1819 to John Meares of Eastington, Pembroke. She died on 2 July 1852.
- Maria Owen, who in 1830 was married to Edward Marcus White, of Hotham, Yorkshire.
- Ellen Owen, who in 1831 married G.B.J. Jordan of Pigeonsford, Cardiganshire.
- Eliza Owen, who married in 1831, Charles Porcher Lang of Sandrock, Surrey.

His first wife died in 1829.

== Early political career ==
Through his mother's friendship with Lady Anna Owen, mother of Sir Hugh Owen of Orielton, he inherited the estate on Sir Hugh's death in 1809, at the expense of the next of kin. He changed his name to John Owen on inheriting the estate and also succeeded Sir Hugh as MP for Pembroke Boroughs that year.

At the 1812 General Election, he successfully contested the Pembrokeshire county seat as well as the boroughs, in opposition to Frederick Campbell, the heir to Lord Cawdor, whose estate at Stackpole was only two miles from Orielton. In his address to the electors, Owen declared that he sought to give the electors their "own free choice at the approaching Election for this County". The poll for the county election remained open for eleven days and proved so costly that Owen was obliged to raise a mortgage on part of his estate. Writing to Sir James Graham many years later in 1841, Owen admitted that this contest marked the beginnings of the financial difficulties that overshadowed his later career.

Following his electoral success, albeit with a heavy financial cost, Owen chose to sit for the county, and held that seat until 1841, when he was returned to the House of Commons for Pembroke Boroughs until his death in 1861, aged 84.

He was made a baronet on 12 Jan 1813, of Orielton, Pembrokeshire. Upon the death of Lord Milford in 1823, Owen was proposed by Robert Peel (who had entered the Commons in the same years as Owen) as Lord-Lieutenant of Pembrokeshire, a post he held from 1824 until his death. This reflected the pre-eminence that Owen held at that time in the public life of the county.

== The Reform crisis and the 1831 elections ==
On 23 March 1831, Owen, together with his son Sir Hugh Owen Owen who had represented Pembroke Boroughs since 1826, voted against Russell's Reform Bill in the Commons. This provoked anger in his constituency amongst supporters of reform. When the government fell shortly afterwards, Owen found that he would be opposed at the General Election by Robert Fulke Greville, who was supported by Lord Kensington.

Greville published his address in late April, directly criticising Owen for his opposition to the Reform Bill. Owen sought to avoid a contest by indicating that he would henceforth support the reform proposals. Opposition was growing, however, and Owen was criticised both for his lax attendance at the Commons and the considerable income that he derived from church patronage in Pembrokeshire. Passing through Carmarthen on route to Pembrokeshire, Owen "was received with hisses and hootings by an immense crowd, who followed him with the same demonstrations to the outskirts of the town."

Polling was conducted over several days on a field at Prendergast, on the outskirts of Haverfordwest. Lawyers engaged by both candidates scrutinised the voting and in his account of the contest, David Williams states that the result was largely determined by the influence of the landed gentry. After chaotic scenes at the poll, Owen was declared the victor, polling 1949 votes against 1850 for his opponent.

Greville immediately launched a petition against the result and after lengthy and costly proceedings, the result was declared void and a further election was held in October. The number of votes cats was several hundred lower than earlier in the year but Owen was again returned by a small majority, polling 1531 votes against 1423 for Greville.

The elections proved costly for Owen and the Orielton estate and by the early 1840s both he and his son were obliged to stay away from Pembrokeshire to escape their creditors.

== Later political career ==
In 1836 Sir John Owen fought a duel at Gumfreston Hall near Tenby with William Richards, a former mayor of the town who was badly wounded in the event. Fought with pistols, it is the last known duel to have taken place in Wales.

He also took up a lease on property in Australia in 1838, but never visited.

In 1841 he was obliged to abandon the county seat which he had held since 1812 and to contest the Pembroke Boroughs. He was opposed by a Liberal candidate, J.N. Child, but also, bizarrely, by his own son. It appears that Hugh's candidacy resulted from the doubts expressed about whether Sir John had the required property qualification to represent the boroughs and that if that proved to be the case, Hugh would take his place. He represented the seat until his death.

The family wealth came from coal mining. South Wales coal was important to the beginning of the Industrial Revolution. His coal mines suffered notable disasters, with many fatalities: an explosion in 1830 and an inundation in 1844.

After a long career as a Conservative, including his opposition to reform in 1831, Owen moved towards the Liberal ranks in later life. He opposed Derby's Reform Bill in 1859 and a few weeks before his death his son and heir contested the Pembrokeshire county seat as a Liberal candidate.

== Personal life ==
Following his first wife's death, he re-married on 2 October 1830 to Mary Frances Stephenson, second daughter of Edward Stephenson of Farley Hill, Berkshire. There were three sons and two daughters from this marriage

- John (b 1831)
- Mary Lord (1833-1892) who married in 1861 Captain Andrew George Onslow of the 97th Foot Regiment.
- William (4 September 1834 - 29 June 1855) who was killed at Sebastopol.
- Arthur (1836-1889) who married in 1871 Margaret Agnes Annie Cowmeadow
- Emma (1837-24 May 1876) died unmarried.

== Later life and death ==
Orielton was sold in the 1850s as a result of debts incurred over many years.

Owen died at Taynton House, Gloucestershire, in February 1861. He was succeeded in the baronetcy by his son Hugh Owen Owen.

== Big House ==
Owen built a country house on the river, with a substantial dock for the coal boats. He named it "Landshipping House" after his colliery of the same name. It was an impressive castellated mansion, imitating Picton Castle across the River Cleddau. However, debts incurred from running for Parliament and losses caused by water inundation in one of his coal mines meant that he had to sell the house to avoid bankruptcy. The inundation of Garden Pit on 14 February 1844 killed 40 miners, some of whom were probably female - despite the passage two years earlier of the Mines and Collieries Act, which forbad women and girls (and boys under ten) from working underground. The sale took place in 1857 at one of the coffeehouses that served as places of business on Exchange Alley in the City of London. The auction details describe the property as extensive.

The house fell into ruin, and stood abandoned for about a century, before being purchased and restored by a local man who had known the building since childhood. The story of the house and its restoration was covered in Restoration Home, a BBC programme shown in August 2011. Architectural historian Kieran Long and social historian Kate Williams researched and presented some of the background about the Owens and their house.

It is known simply as "Big House".

== Sources ==
- Williams, David (1960). "The Pembrokeshire Elections of 1831" (PDF). Welsh History Review. 1 (1): 37–64.

Parliament of the United Kingdom
Preceded by Sir Hugh Owen	Member of Parliament for Pembroke Boroughs; 1809 – 1812	Succeeded by Sir Thomas Picton
Preceded by The Lord Milford	Member of Parliament for Pembrokeshire; 1812–1841	Succeeded by Viscount Emlyn
Preceded by Sir James Graham	Member of Parliament for Pembroke Boroughs; 1841–1861	Succeeded by Sir Hugh Owen
Honorary titles
Preceded by The Earl of Uxbridge	Vice-Admiral of Pembrokeshire; 1812–1861	Vacant
Preceded by The Lord Milford	Lord Lieutenant of Pembrokeshire; 1824–1861	Succeeded by The Lord Kensington
Baronetage of the United Kingdom
New title	Baronet (of Orielton, Pembrokeshire); 1813–1861	Succeeded by Hugh Owen Owen
