= Lord Lieutenant of Montgomeryshire =

Welsh county ceremonial officer

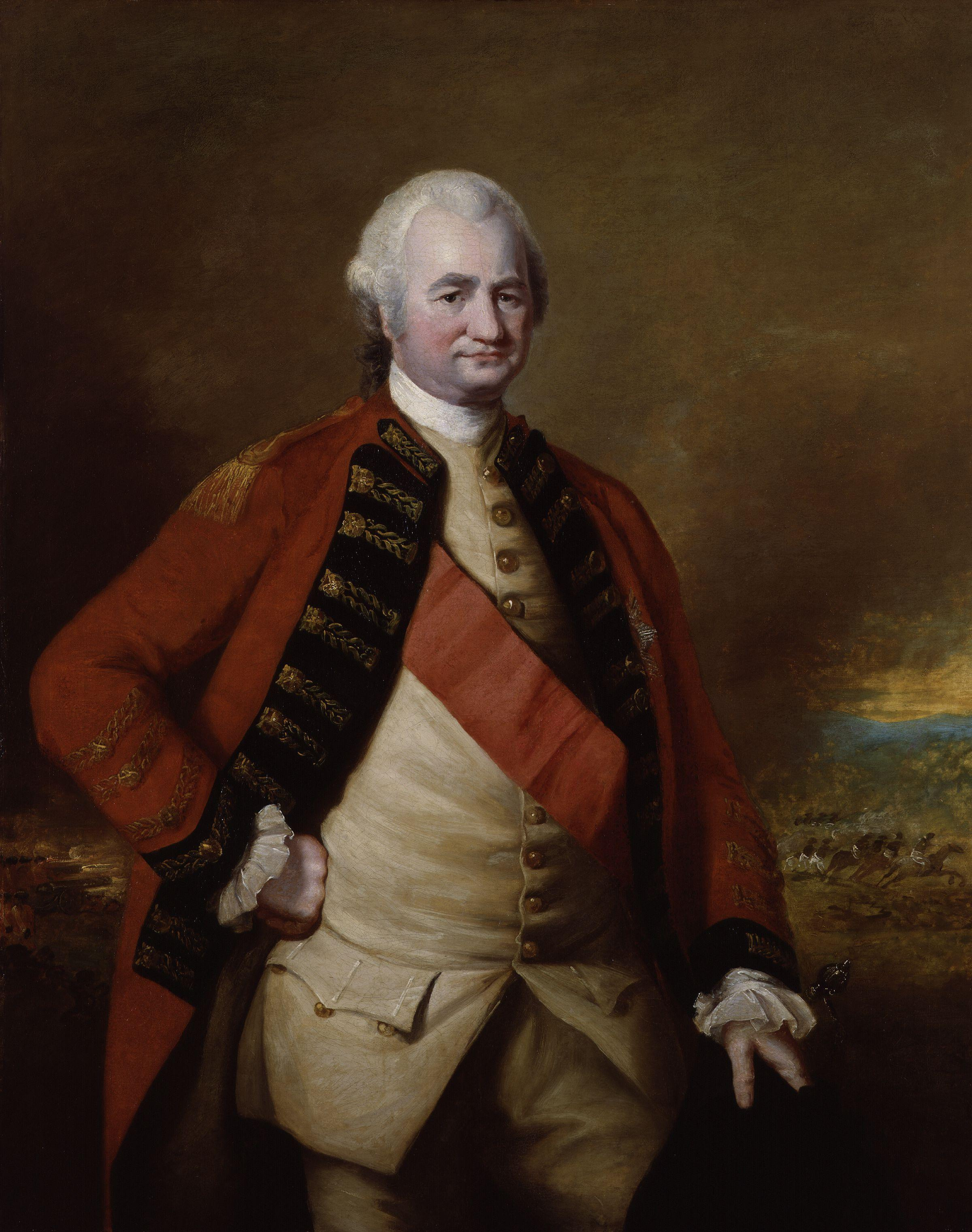
Robert Clive, 1st Baron Clive, by Nathaniel Dance

The following is a list of people who have held the title of Lord Lieutenant of Montgomeryshire. After 1761, all Lord Lieutenants were also Custos Rotulorum of Montgomeryshire. The office was abolished on 31 March 1974 and replaced by the Lord Lieutenant of Powys, with Deputy Lieutenants for Montgomeryshire.

== Lord Lieutenants of Montgomeryshire to 1974 ==
See Lord Lieutenant of Wales for before 1694

- Robert Devereux, 3rd Earl of Essex (appointed by Parliament) 1642 – 14 September 1646
- Charles Talbot, 1st Duke of Shrewsbury 31 May 1694 – 10 March 1696
- Charles Gerard, 2nd Earl of Macclesfield 10 March 1696 – 5 November 1701
- William Stanley, 9th Earl of Derby 18 June 1702 – 5 November 1702
- Hugh Cholmondeley, 1st Earl of Cholmondeley 2 December 1702 – 4 September 1713
- Other Windsor, 2nd Earl of Plymouth 4 September 1713 – 21 October 1714
- Hugh Cholmondeley, 1st Earl of Cholmondeley 21 October 1714 – 18 January 1725
- George Cholmondeley, 2nd Earl of Cholmondeley 7 April 1725 – 7 May 1733
- George Cholmondeley, 3rd Earl of Cholmondeley 14 June 1733 – 25 October 1760
- Henry Herbert, 1st Earl of Powis 4 July 1761 – 10 September 1772
- Robert Clive 17 June 1773 – 2 November 1774
- Francis Seymour-Conway, 1st Earl of Hertford 20 April 1775 – 21 November 1776
- George Herbert, 2nd Earl of Powis 21 November 1776 – 16 January 1801
- vacant
- Edward Clive, 1st Earl of Powis 18 May 1804 – 20 November 1830
- Edward Herbert, 2nd Earl of Powis 20 November 1830 – 17 January 1848
- Charles Hanbury-Tracy, 1st Baron Sudeley 26 February 1848 – 10 February 1858
- Thomas Hanbury-Tracy, 2nd Baron Sudeley 4 March 1858 – 19 February 1863
- Sudeley Hanbury-Tracy, 3rd Baron Sudeley 21 April 1863 – 28 April 1877
- Edward James Herbert, 3rd Earl of Powis 25 May 1877 – 7 May 1891
- Sir Herbert Williams-Wynn, 7th Baronet 10 June 1891 – 24 May 1944
- Sir George Frederick Hamer 26 June 1950 – 4 April 1960
- Col. John Lyon Corbett-Winder, † 4 April 1960 – 31 March 1974

† Became the first Lord Lieutenant of Powys on 1 April 1974.
