= Lord Lieutenant of Caernarvonshire =

Welsh county ceremonial officer

This is a list of individual who served as Lord Lieutenant of Caernarvonshire. Since 1778, all Lord Lieutenants have also held the position of Custos Rotulorum of Caernarvonshire. The office was abolished on 31 March 1974 and succeeded by the position of Lord Lieutenant of Gwynedd.

== Lord Lieutenants of Caernarvonshire to 1974 ==
- see Lord Lieutenant of Wales before 1694
- Charles Talbot, 1st Duke of Shrewsbury 31 May 1694 – 10 March 1696
- Charles Gerard, 2nd Earl of Macclesfield 10 March 1696 – 5 November 1701
- William Stanley, 9th Earl of Derby 18 June 1702 – 5 November 1702
- Hugh Cholmondeley, 1st Earl of Cholmondeley 2 December 1702 – 4 September 1713
- Other Windsor, 2nd Earl of Plymouth 4 September 1713 – 21 October 1714
- Hugh Cholmondeley, 1st Earl of Cholmondeley 21 October 1714 – 18 January 1725
- George Cholmondeley, 2nd Earl of Cholmondeley 7 April 1725 – 7 May 1733
- George Cholmondeley, 3rd Earl of Cholmondeley 14 June 1733 – 25 October 1760
- Thomas Wynn, 1st Baron Newborough 4 July 1761 – 27 December 1781
- Thomas Bulkeley, 7th Viscount Bulkeley 27 December 1781 – 3 June 1822
- Thomas Assheton Smith 18 July 1822 – 12 May 1828
- Peter Drummond-Burrell, 22nd Baron Willoughby de Eresby 25 November 1828 – 7 March 1851
- Sir Richard Williams-Bulkeley, 10th Baronet 7 March 1851 – 14 September 1866
- Edward Douglas-Pennant, 1st Baron Penrhyn 14 September 1866 – 31 March 1886
- John Ernest Greaves 17 May 1886 – 5 September 1933
- Hugh Douglas-Pennant, 4th Baron Penrhyn 5 September 1933 – 9 April 1941
- Sir William Wynne-Finch 9 April 1941 – 27 January 1960
- Sir Michael Duff, 3rd Baronet 27 January 1960 – 31 March 1974

== Deputy lieutenants ==
A deputy lieutenant of Caernarvonshire is commissioned by the Lord Lieutenant of Caernarvonshire. Deputy lieutenants assist with the duties of the lord-lieutenant. The number of Deputy Lieutenants can vary based on the country's population. Their appointment remain effect despite changes in the Lord Lieutenant, although they typically retire at the age of 75.

=== 19th Century ===
- 5 August 1834: William Lloyd Gwyllym Wardle
- 1 June 1846: Spencer Bulkeley Wynn, 3rd Baron Newborough
- 1 June 1846: Edward Douglas-Pennant, 1st Baron Penrhyn
- 1 June 1846: Lieutenant General Sir Charles Felix Smith
- 1 June 1846: Thomas Assheton Smith
- 1 June 1846: Richard Lloyd Edwards
- 1 June 1846: John Griffith Griffith
- 1 June 1846: Samuel Owen Priestley
- 1 June 1846: George Augustus Huddart
- 1 June 1846: James Hilton Ford
- 1 June 1846: John Rowlands
- 1 June 1846: Frank Jones Walker Jones
- 1 June 1846: John Morgan
- 1 June 1846: David White Griffith
- 1 June 1846: John Wyatt Watling
- 1 June 1846: Hugh Woodhouse Acland

== Sources ==
- J.C. Sainty (1970). "Lieutenancies of Counties, 1585–1642". Bulletin of the Institute of Historical Research (Special Supplement No. 8).
- J.C. Sainty (1979). List of Lieutenants of Counties of England and Wales 1660-1974. London: Swift Printers (Sales) Ltd.
