= 1830s in Wales =

- 1820s | 1840s | Other years in Wales
- Other events of the decade

This article is about the particular significance of the decade 1830–1839 to Wales and its people.

== Events ==
- 1830
- 1831
- 1832
- 1833
- 1834
- 1835
- 1836
- 1837
- 1838
- 1839

== Arts and literature ==
=== New books ===
- Charles James Apperley - The Chace, the Road, and the Turf (1837)
- Eliza Constantia Campbell - Tales about Wales (1837)
- John Evans (I. D. Ffraid) - Hanes yr Iddewon (1831)
- Y Fwyalchen (poetry anthology) (1835)
- Felicia Hemans - Songs of the Affections (1830)
- Benjamin Jones (PA Môn) - Athrawiaeth Bedydd (1830)
- Sir Samuel Rush Meyrick - Engraved Illustrations of Antient Arms and Armour, from the Collection at Goodrich Court (1830)
- Thomas Price (Carnhuanawc) - Hanes Cymru a Chenedl y Cymry o'r Cynoesoedd hyd at Farwolaeth Llywelyn ap Gruffydd, vol. 1 (1836)
- William Williams (Caledfryn) - Drych Barddonol (1839)

=== Music ===
- Thomas Griffiths (Tau Gimel) - Casgliad o Hymnau (1830)
- David James - Myfyrdawd (1833)

== Births ==
- 1830
  - 23 January - Thomas Lloyd-Mostyn, politician (d. 1861)
  - 22 April - Sarah Emily Davies, educator (d. 1921)
  - May - Richard Davies (Tafolog), poet and critic (d. 1904)
  - 25 May - Robert Williams (Trebor Mai), poet (d. 1877)
- 1831
  - 20 December - William T. Davies, Governor of Pennsylvania (d. 1912)
- 1832
  - 5 January - Love Jones-Parry, politician and Patagonian settler (d. 1891)
  - 3 April - William Thomas (Islwyn), poet (d. 1878)
  - 25 September - John Ceiriog Hughes, poet (d. 1887)
- 1833
  - date unknown
    - Richard Davies (Mynyddog), poet (d. 1877)
    - James James, harpist and composer (d. 1902)
- 1834
  - 16 October - Pryce Pryce-Jones, mail order entrepreneur (d. 1920)
  - date unknown - William Thomas (Gwilym Marles), minister (d. 1879)
- 1836
  - 30 January - Lewis Jones, Patagonian settler (d. 1904)
  - 5 July - Evan Herber Evans, minister (d. 1896)
  - 30 September - George Douglas-Pennant, 2nd Baron Penrhyn, industrialist (d. 1907)
  - 6 October - Allen Raine, novelist (d. 1908)
  - 20 October - Daniel Owen, novelist (d. 1895)
  - date unknown - John Jones (Myrddin Fardd), poet (d. 1921)
- 1837
  - 5 August - William Lewis, 1st Baron Merthyr, industrialist (d. 1914)
  - 6 September - Henry Thomas Edwards, preacher (d. 1884)
  - 22 September - Thomas Charles Edwards, minister, writer and first principal of the University of Wales (d. 1900)
  - 26 December - Sir William Boyd Dawkins, geologist (d. 1929)
  - date unknown - William Bowen Rowlands, politician (d. 1906)
- 1838
  - date unknown - Charles Gresford Edmondes, clergyman and teacher (d. 1893)
- 1839
  - 7 March - Ludwig Mond, German-born industrialist (d. 1909)
  - 24 September - John Neale Dalton, royal chaplain and tutor (d. 1931)
  - date unknown - Sarah Jane Rees (Cranogwen), writer (d. 1916)

== Deaths ==
- 1830
  - 26 June - King George IV of the United Kingdom, formerly the second longest-serving Prince of Wales (1762-1820)
- 1831
  - 7 January - Edward "Celtic" Davies, author, 74
  - 8 June - Sarah Siddons, actress (born 1755)
  - 13 August - Dic Penderyn, labourer (executed) (born 1808)
- 1834
  - 11 August - William Crawshay I, industrialist (b. 1764)
  - 2 September - David Charles, hymn-writer (b. 1762)
- 1835
  - 13 May - John Nash, architect (b. 1752)
  - 3 June - William Owen Pughe, grammarian and lexicographer (b. 1759)
  - date unknown - Robert Davies (Robin Ddu o'r Glyn), poet (b. 1769)
- 1836
  - 22 November - Peter Bailey Williams, antiquarian (b. 1763)
- 1837
  - 19 February - Thomas Burgess, Bishop of St David's, 80
- 1838
  - 14 March - Wyndham Lewis, MP, 57
  - 19 July - Christmas Evans, preacher (b. 1766)
  - 26 December - Ann Hatton, novelist (b. 1764)
- 1839
  - 16 May - Edward Clive, 1st Earl of Powis
