= 1838 in Wales =

- Centuries: 17th; 18th; 19th; 20th; 21st
- Decades: 1810s; 1820s; 1830s; 1840s; 1850s
- See also: List of years in Wales; Timeline of Welsh history 1838 in The United Kingdom Scotland Elsewhere

This article is about the particular significance of the year 1838 to Wales and its people.

== Incumbents ==
- Lord Lieutenant of Anglesey – Henry Paget, 1st Marquess of Anglesey
- Lord Lieutenant of Brecknockshire – Penry Williams
- Lord Lieutenant of Caernarvonshire – Peter Drummond-Burrell, 22nd Baron Willoughby de Eresby
- Lord Lieutenant of Cardiganshire – William Edward Powell
- Lord Lieutenant of Carmarthenshire – George Rice, 3rd Baron Dynevor
- Lord Lieutenant of Denbighshire – Sir Watkin Williams-Wynn, 5th Baronet
- Lord Lieutenant of Flintshire – Robert Grosvenor, 1st Marquess of Westminster
- Lord Lieutenant of Glamorgan – John Crichton-Stuart, 2nd Marquess of Bute
- Lord Lieutenant of Merionethshire – Sir Watkin Williams-Wynn, 5th Baronet
- Lord Lieutenant of Monmouthshire – Capel Hanbury Leigh
- Lord Lieutenant of Montgomeryshire – Edward Herbert, 2nd Earl of Powis
- Lord Lieutenant of Pembrokeshire – Sir John Owen, 1st Baronet
- Lord Lieutenant of Radnorshire – George Rodney, 3rd Baron Rodney
- Bishop of Bangor – Christopher Bethell
- Bishop of Llandaff – Edward Copleston
- Bishop of St Asaph – William Carey
- Bishop of St Davids – John Jenkinson

== Events ==
- October - John Frost joins the Chartist movement.
- Newly created baronets include Sir John Josiah Guest, Sir Benjamin Hall and Sir John Edwards.
- John Cory of Devon opens his chandlery near the Custom House in Cardiff.
- Thomas Gee joins his father's printing business.
- Tinplate manufacture at Ystalyfera begins.
- Wrexham Infirmary established.
- Foundation of the Bangor Church Building Society.

== Arts and literature ==
- A major eisteddfod is held at Abergavenny.

=== New books ===
- Sir Henry Ellis (ed.) - Registrum vulgariter nuncupatum "The record of Caernarvon"
- Lady Charlotte Guest begins publication of her translation into English of the Mabinogion.
- Isaac Williams - Thoughts in Past Years
- Jane Williams (Ysgafell) - Twenty Essays on the Practical Improvement of God's Providential Dispensations as Means to the Moral Discipline to the Christian

=== Visual arts ===
- J. M. W. Turner paints a watercolour of Flint Castle.

== Births ==
- 14 April - John Thomas, photographer (d. 1905)
- 8 December - Charles Gresford Edmondes, clergyman and teacher (d. 1893)
- 27 December - James Conway Brown, musician (d. 1908)

== Deaths ==
- 23 January - Pascoe Grenfell, industrialist and politician, 76
- 14 March - Wyndham Lewis, MP, 57
- 19 July - Christmas Evans, preacher, 71
- 26 August - Sir John Nicholl, politician and judge, 79
- 18 September - Griffith Williams (Gutyn Peris), poet, 69
- 26 December - Julia Ann Hatton, novelist, 74

== See also ==
- 1838 in Ireland
