= 1830 in Wales =

- Centuries: 17th; 18th; 19th; 20th; 21st
- Decades: 1810s; 1820s; 1830s; 1840s; 1850s
- See also: List of years in Wales; Timeline of Welsh history 1830 in The United Kingdom Scotland Elsewhere

This article is about the particular significance of the year 1830 to Wales and its people.

== Incumbents ==
- Lord Lieutenant of Anglesey – Henry Paget, 1st Marquess of Anglesey
- Lord Lieutenant of Brecknockshire – Henry Somerset, 6th Duke of Beaufort
- Lord Lieutenant of Caernarvonshire – Peter Drummond-Burrell, 22nd Baron Willoughby de Eresby
- Lord Lieutenant of Cardiganshire – William Edward Powell
- Lord Lieutenant of Carmarthenshire – George Rice, 3rd Baron Dynevor
- Lord Lieutenant of Denbighshire – Sir Watkin Williams-Wynn, 5th Baronet
- Lord Lieutenant of Flintshire – Robert Grosvenor, 1st Marquess of Westminster
- Lord Lieutenant of Glamorgan – John Crichton-Stuart, 2nd Marquess of Bute
- Lord Lieutenant of Merionethshire – Sir Watkin Williams-Wynn, 5th Baronet
- Lord Lieutenant of Montgomeryshire – Edward Clive, 1st Earl of Powis (until 20 November; Edward Herbert, 2nd Earl of Powis (from 20 November)
- Lord Lieutenant of Pembrokeshire – Sir John Owen, 1st Baronet
- Lord Lieutenant of Radnorshire – George Rodney, 3rd Baron Rodney
- Bishop of Bangor – Henry Majendie (until 9 July); Christopher Bethell (from 28 October)
- Bishop of Llandaff – Edward Copleston
- Bishop of St Asaph – John Luxmoore (until 31 January)William Carey (from 12 November)
- Bishop of St Davids – John Jenkinson

== Events ==
- February 23 - William Carey becomes Bishop of St Asaph.
- April 23 - John Montgomery Traherne marries Charlotte Louisa Talbot, daughter of Thomas Mansel Talbot of Margam.
- September 1 - In the 1830 United Kingdom general election, Christopher Rice Mansel Talbot is elected for Glamorganshire as a Whig; he will continue to sit for a Glamorganshire constituency until his death in 1890.
- The Penydarren works at Merthyr Tydfil produce the rails for the world's first steam railway.
- The Plymouth ironworks produces over 12,000 tons of bar-iron, compared with 7,941 tons ten years earlier.
- Sir Thomas Frankland Lewis is appointed Treasurer of the Navy by the Duke of Wellington.

== Arts and literature ==
=== New books ===
- Ellis Evans - Anogaeth i Athrawon ac Athrawesau ein Hysgolion Sabothol
- Felicia Hemans - Songs of the Affections
- Benjamin Jones (PA Môn) - Athrawiaeth Bedydd (1830)
- Sir Samuel Rush Meyrick - Engraved Illustrations of Antient Arms and Armour, from the Collection at Goodrich Court

=== Music ===
- Thomas Griffiths (Tau Gimel) - Casgliad o Hymnau

== Births ==
- 23 January - Thomas Lloyd-Mostyn, politician (d. 1861)
- 22 April - Sarah Emily Davies, educator (d. 1921)
- May - Richard Davies (Tafolog), poet and critic (d. 1904)
- 25 May - Robert Williams (Trebor Mai), poet (d. 1877)
- 2 June - Sir John Henry Puleston, banker and politician (d. 1908)
- 12 December - Edwin Hughes ("Balaclava Ned"), soldier, last survivor of the Charge of the Light Brigade (d. 1927)

== Deaths ==
- 12 January - Owen Davies, Wesleyan Methodist leader
- 31 January - John Luxmoore, Bishop of St Asaph, 64
- 26 June - King George IV of the United Kingdom, formerly the second longest-serving Prince of Wales (1762–1820), 67
- 9 July - Henry William Majendie, Bishop of Bangor
- 18 November - John Howell (Ioan ab Hywel or Ioan Glandyfroedd), poet
- 29 November - James Humphreys, lawyer, about 62

== See also ==
- 1830 in Ireland
