= 1835 in Wales =

- Centuries: 17th; 18th; 19th; 20th; 21st
- Decades: 1810s; 1820s; 1830s; 1840s; 1850s
- See also: List of years in Wales; Timeline of Welsh history 1835 in The United Kingdom Scotland Elsewhere

This article is about the particular significance of the year 1835 to Wales and its people.

== Incumbents ==
- Lord Lieutenant of Anglesey – Henry Paget, 1st Marquess of Anglesey
- Lord Lieutenant of Brecknockshire – Henry Somerset, 6th Duke of Beaufort (until 23 November); Penry Williams (from 24 December)
- Lord Lieutenant of Caernarvonshire – Peter Drummond-Burrell, 22nd Baron Willoughby de Eresby
- Lord Lieutenant of Cardiganshire – William Edward Powell
- Lord Lieutenant of Carmarthenshire – George Rice, 3rd Baron Dynevor
- Lord Lieutenant of Denbighshire – Sir Watkin Williams-Wynn, 5th Baronet
- Lord Lieutenant of Flintshire – Robert Grosvenor, 1st Marquess of Westminster
- Lord Lieutenant of Glamorgan – John Crichton-Stuart, 2nd Marquess of Bute
- Lord Lieutenant of Merionethshire – Sir Watkin Williams-Wynn, 5th Baronet
- Lord Lieutenant of Monmouthshire – Henry Somerset, 6th Duke of Beaufort (until 23 November); Capel Hanbury Leigh (from 24 December
- Lord Lieutenant of Montgomeryshire – Edward Herbert, 2nd Earl of Powis
- Lord Lieutenant of Pembrokeshire – Sir John Owen, 1st Baronet
- Lord Lieutenant of Radnorshire – George Rodney, 3rd Baron Rodney
- Bishop of Bangor – Christopher Bethell
- Bishop of Llandaff – Edward Copleston
- Bishop of St Asaph – William Carey
- Bishop of St Davids – John Jenkinson

== Events ==
- 8 January - Sir Joseph Bailey is elected MP for Worcester.
- 19 February - In the United Kingdom general election, newly elected MPs in Wales include Wilson Jones at Denbigh Boroughs.
- March - At a public meeting in the King's Head Inn, Newport, plans for a floating dock are agreed.
- July - The Newport Dock Act receives the royal assent.
- September - John Frost is one of the first councillors elected in Newport under the terms of the Municipal Reform Act.
- 1 December - John Owen, mayor of Newport, cuts the first sod as construction begins on Newport Docks.
- date unknown
  - The steam whistle, invented by Adrian Stephens two years earlier, is seen in operation at Dowlais ironworks and is adopted by the Liverpool and Manchester Railway shortly afterwards.
  - Adam Sedgwick names the Cambrian period in geology.

== Arts and literature ==
- The Royal Institution of South Wales is established as the Swansea Philosophical and Literary Society.

=== New books ===
- Y Fwyalchen (poetry anthology)
- Edward Herbert, 2nd Earl of Powis - The Lyvys of the Seyntys

=== Music ===
- Anglesey Musical Society holds its first festival.
- John Roberts (Alaw Elwy) plays the harp for Queen Adelaide at Winchester.

== Births ==
- 5 April (in Trowbridge) – Solomon Andrews, entrepreneur (d. 1908)
- 10 May – John Jenkins, 1st Baron Glantawe, industrialist (d. 1913)
- 14 July – John Roberts, politician (d. 1894)
- 7 August – Griffith Evans, bacteriologist (d. 1935)
- 29 August – Ivor Guest, 1st Baron Wimborne (d. 1914)

== Deaths ==
- 3 March – Daniel Evans, Independent minister and author, 61
- 1 May – Edward Jones, architect, 39
- 13 May – John Nash, architect, 83
- 16 May – Felicia Hemans, poet, 41
- 4 June – William Owen Pughe, grammarian and lexicographer, 75
- 23 November – Henry Somerset, 6th Duke of Beaufort, Lord Lieutenant of Brecknockshire and Monmouthshire, 68
- 1 December – Robert Davies (Robin Ddu o'r Glyn), poet, 66
- 16 December – David Price, East India Company officer, 73
- 29 December – Richard Llwyd, poet, 83

== See also ==
- 1835 in Ireland
