= John Howell =

John Howell may refer to:

== Sports people ==
- John Howell (athlete) (born 1936), British Olympic long jumper
- John Howell (bobsleigh) (1955–2006), British Olympic bobsledder
- John Howell (cricketer) (1943–2010), New Zealand cricketer
- John Howell (defensive back) (born 1978), National Football League safety
- John Howell (halfback) (1915–1946), National Football League halfback

== Other people ==
- John Howell (art director) (1914–1993), British film set designer
- John Howell (activist) (1933–1988), community activist in Atlanta, Georgia
- John Howell (MP for Exeter), 17th century, English MP for Exeter, 1601
- John Howell (poet) (1774–1830), Welsh poet
- John Howell (politician) (born 1955), British Member of Parliament
- John Howell (polyartist) (1788–1863), Scottish inventor in Edinburgh
- John Howell (pioneer) (1809–1874), New Zealand whaler, trader, pastoralist, and politician
- John Howell (mining engineer) (1833–1910), Canadian-born, naturalized-American mining engineer, who worked in Australia from 1889
- John Adams Howell (1840–1918), rear admiral of the United States Navy, served in the American Civil War and the Spanish–American War; also a noted inventor.
- John Cummings Howell (1819–1892), rear admiral of the United States Navy, served in the American Civil War
- John McDade Howell (1922–2016), American academic; chancellor of East Carolina University
- John Bruce Howell (1941–1997), American librarian and bibliographer
- John H. Howell, US Army artillery officer
- John Henry Howell (1869–1944), New Zealand technical college principal and Quaker
- John Morgan Howell (1855–1928), political figure in Cardiganshire, Wales
- John Thomas Howell (1903–1994), American botanist and taxonomist
- John White Howell (1857–1937), American electrical engineer

== Other ==
- John Howell & Son, 19th-century British engineering company

== See also ==
- Jack Howell (disambiguation)
- John Mead Howells (1868–1959), American architect
