= 1836 in Wales =

- Centuries: 17th; 18th; 19th; 20th; 21st
- Decades: 1810s; 1820s; 1830s; 1840s; 1850s
- See also: List of years in Wales; Timeline of Welsh history 1836 in The United Kingdom Scotland Elsewhere

This article is about the particular significance of the year 1836 to Wales and its people.

== Incumbents ==
- Lord Lieutenant of Anglesey – Henry Paget, 1st Marquess of Anglesey
- Lord Lieutenant of Brecknockshire – Penry Williams
- Lord Lieutenant of Caernarvonshire – Peter Drummond-Burrell, 22nd Baron Willoughby de Eresby
- Lord Lieutenant of Cardiganshire – William Edward Powell
- Lord Lieutenant of Carmarthenshire – George Rice, 3rd Baron Dynevor
- Lord Lieutenant of Denbighshire – Sir Watkin Williams-Wynn, 5th Baronet
- Lord Lieutenant of Flintshire – Robert Grosvenor, 1st Marquess of Westminster
- Lord Lieutenant of Glamorgan – John Crichton-Stuart, 2nd Marquess of Bute
- Lord Lieutenant of Merionethshire – Sir Watkin Williams-Wynn, 5th Baronet
- Lord Lieutenant of Monmouthshire – Capel Hanbury Leigh
- Lord Lieutenant of Montgomeryshire – Edward Herbert, 2nd Earl of Powis
- Lord Lieutenant of Pembrokeshire – Sir John Owen, 1st Baronet
- Lord Lieutenant of Radnorshire – George Rodney, 3rd Baron Rodney
- Bishop of Bangor – Christopher Bethell
- Bishop of Llandaff – Edward Copleston
- Bishop of St Asaph – William Carey
- Bishop of St Davids – John Jenkinson

== Events ==
- 20 April – Opening of the Ffestiniog Railway, the first narrow-gauge railway in the world.
- 21 June – An Act of Parliament is passed, allowing the construction of the Taff Vale Railway.
- June – Crawshay Bailey buys the Aberaman estate from the family of Anthony Bacon at auction.
- 9 November – John Frost is elected Mayor of Newport.
- date unknown
  - The final known duel in Wales takes place, fought with pistols at Gumfreston Hall in Pembrokeshire, between MP Sir John Owen and former Tenby mayor William Richards. Richards is badly wounded.
  - Humphrey Gwalchmai launches the periodical Yr Athraw.
  - The Philanthropic Order of True Ivorites is established in Wrexham by Thomas Robert Jones, it is Wales' first friendly society.

== Arts and literature ==
=== New books ===
==== English language ====
- Rice Rees - An Essay on the Welsh Saints
- Thomas Roscoe - Wanderings and Excursions in North Wales
- Samuel Prideaux Tregelles - Passages in the Old Testament connected with the Revelation

==== Welsh language ====
- Thomas Price (Carnhuanawc) - Hanes Cymru a Chenedl y Cymry o'r Cynoesoedd hyd at Farwolaeth Llywelyn ap Gruffydd, vol. 1
- John Williams (Ab Ithel) - Eglwys Loegr yn Anymddibynol ar Eglwys Rhufain

=== Music ===
- John David Edwards - Original Sacred Music

== Births ==
- 30 January – Lewis Jones, one of the founders of the Welsh settlement in Patagonia (d. 1904)
- 15 March – Griffith Jones (Glan Menai), teacher and author (d. 1906)
- 1 April – John Owen, balladeer (d. 1915)
- 26 May – Sir John Dillwyn-Llewellyn, 1st Baronet, politician (d. 1927)
- 5 July – Evan Herber Evans, Nonconformist leader (d. 1896)
- 6 October – Allen Raine, novelist (d. 1908)
- 20 October – Daniel Owen, novelist (d. 1895)
- 9 November – Isaac Foulkes, newspaper proprietor (d. 1904)
- 9 November – Arthur Charles Humphreys-Owen, politician (d. 1905)

== Deaths ==
- 11 August - William Williams (Gwilym Twrog), poet, 67
- 24 August Sir Christopher Cole, Royal Navy officer and politician, 66
- 22 November - Peter Bailey Williams, clergyman and writer, 73
- 27 December - Edward Jones, Maes y Plwm, hymn-writer, 75

== See also ==
- 1836 in Ireland
