= Offwell =

Village in Devon, England

Coordinates: 50.791°N 3.143°W

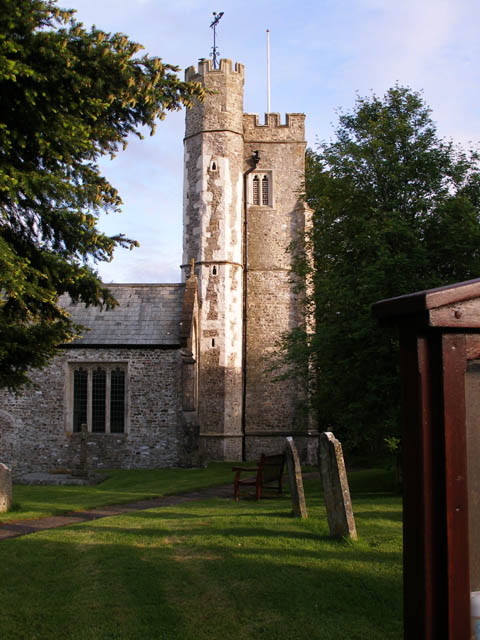
- St Mary's Church

- Location within Devon
- Area: 8.142 km^{2} (3.144 sq mi)
- Population: 437 (2021 census)
  - Density: 54/km^{2} (140/sq mi)
- OS grid reference: SY195996
- Civil parish: Offwell
- District: East Devon
- Shire county: Devon
- Region: South West
- Country: England
- Sovereign state: United Kingdom
- Post town: HONITON
- Postcode district: EX14
- Dialling code: 01404
- Police: Devon and Cornwall
- Fire: Devon and Somerset
- Ambulance: South Western
- UK Parliament: Honiton and Sidmouth

Offwell is a village and civil parish in the East Devon district in Devon, England, approximately 2 miles south-east from the nearest town, Honiton. Offwell can be accessed by the nearby A35 road. In 2021 the parish had a population of 437.

Offwell has a primary school and a village hall. There are several business located along the A35 as it passes through the parish, including a fuel garage, a deli, and a garden centre.

The medieval church of St Mary has a chancel arch, one chancel window and a south doorway which date from c. 1200. There are a west tower, a north aisle and a north chapel. Features of interest include the early 18th-century pulpit and reader's desk, the Lord's prayer and creed mural painting, and some Jacobean carvings.

Offwell House, built in 1830, was the residence of Bishop Copleston. The Copleston family arrived in the parish in the late 18th Century and provided many of its Rectors from 1772 to 1954, with notable Rectors including The Reverend John Copleston. They transformed the village and parish with their generosity and influence.

Because of the complexities of its medieval past, Offwell had no lord of the manor and so the church was the focus of authority. This authority was wielded not only by its rectors, who varied greatly in their commitment to the parish, but also by its landowners who served as churchwardens, and sometimes as overseers of the poor, by rotation.

The village sits next to the Offwell woodland, which has its own wildlife trust.

== Colwell Wood ==
The parish also contains Colwell Wood, a small estate, lying to the west of the village. There is only one property situated there, a seemingly insignificant cottage known as Colwell Wood Cottage. This property and the land around it, have links with some of the most powerful landed families in medieval England, with a Napoleonic war hero and a King.

As a small estate Colwell's history can be traced back to the Domesday Book. As a small part in much larger estates it passed through the hands of the great aristocratic families of de Courtenay, Hungerford and Hastings. During the Wars of the Roses, and the period of Yorkist rule between 1461 and 1485, it was held by the ill-fated Richard, Duke of Gloucester, who finally became King Richard III.

The aristocrats were succeeded as landowners in Colwell by the local gentry – Franklin, Collins, Southcott, Marwood and Mayne – some of whose names live on in memorials in Offwell church. This history of this period was a complex one, since the estate was fragmented, with different pieces of the jigsaw changing hands fairly frequently.

Admiral Sir Thomas Graves, who was second in command to Lord Nelson at the Battle of Copenhagen (1801), bought Colwell Wood in 1798 for £1,210. In 1805 he gave it to his daughter Mary, and shortly afterwards the Cottage, the only building present in the woods, was built. The wood was a sound investment, for timber fetched high prices, but it had also acquired a new value. Whereas natural woodland had traditionally been viewed with trepidation, full of danger and mystery, the Romantic age saw it with new eyes. For those who had leisure, a ramble in the woods was now something to be relished, and the steep wooded dells of Offwell had already won the heart of the parish's most famous son, Edward Copleston, Bishop of Llandaff, who in 1825 wrote to a friend:

Natural history is the food of my vacation hours, and I shall take your precious volume with me when I next go to saunter and ramble in my Offwell woods. It would do my heart good to have you one day to join me in those rambles over the scenes of my infancy ...

Thereafter, the dual functions of Colwell Wood can be traced more readily. It firstly remained an asset due to its timber and cover for breeding game birds, and secondly it was a tourist retreat. In 1985 Colwell Wood was acquired by its current owner who has funded research into its history, restored the Cottage, and striven to preserve its tranquillity and natural environment.
