= John Copleston (cricketer) =

English cricketer and clergyman

Personal information
- Full name: John Henry Copleston
- Born: 8 August 1841; Lamyatt, Somerset, England
- Died: 22 November 1918 (aged 77); Offwell, Devon, England
- Batting: Unknown

Domestic team information
- Years: Team
- 1860–1862: Oxford University

Career statistics
Competition	First-class
Matches	2
Runs scored	7
Batting average	7.00
100s/50s	–/–
Top score	5*
Catches/stumpings	1/–
- Source: Cricinfo, 14 January 2020

The Reverend John Henry Copleston (8 August 1841 – 22 November 1918) was an English first-class cricketer and clergyman.

The son of The Reverend John Gaius Copleston, he was born in August 1841 at Lamyatt, Somerset. He was educated at Winchester College, before going up to St John's College, Oxford. While studying at Oxford, Copleston played two first-class cricket matches for Oxford University separated by two years. His first match came against the Marylebone Cricket Club at Oxford in 1860, with his second appearance coming at Oxford against the same opposition in 1862. Despite appearing in these matches for Oxford, he did not gain a blue.

After graduating from Oxford, he took holy orders in the Anglican Church. He held several ecclesiastical posts in the West Country, starting at West Buckland, Devon where he was the canon from 1864 to 1868. He moved to Kilkhampton in the neighbouring county of Cornwall in 1868 to take the post of rector, which he held until 1871. He returned to West Buckland in 1871, where he was the rector until 1880. Remaining in Devon, he moved to Offwell in 1880 to take the post of rector there, the fifth member of his family to do so. From 1895 he simultaneously held the post of rural dean for Dunkeswell and Honiton until 1910. He served as the rector at Offwell until his death in November 1918. In addition to playing first-class cricket, Copleston was also a leading figure in Devon cricket, playing for the county for thirty years prior to the formation of Devon County Cricket Club. His great-grandfather was Edward Copleston, the Bishop of Llandaff.
