= All Saints Primary School, Gresford =

School in Wrexham, Wales

Coordinates: 53°05′13″N 2°58′40″W

All Saints Primary School is a primary school in Gresford, Wales. It was built in memory of Thomas Vowler Short, Bishop of St Asaph, in 1874. It is a Grade II listed building.

== Establishment ==
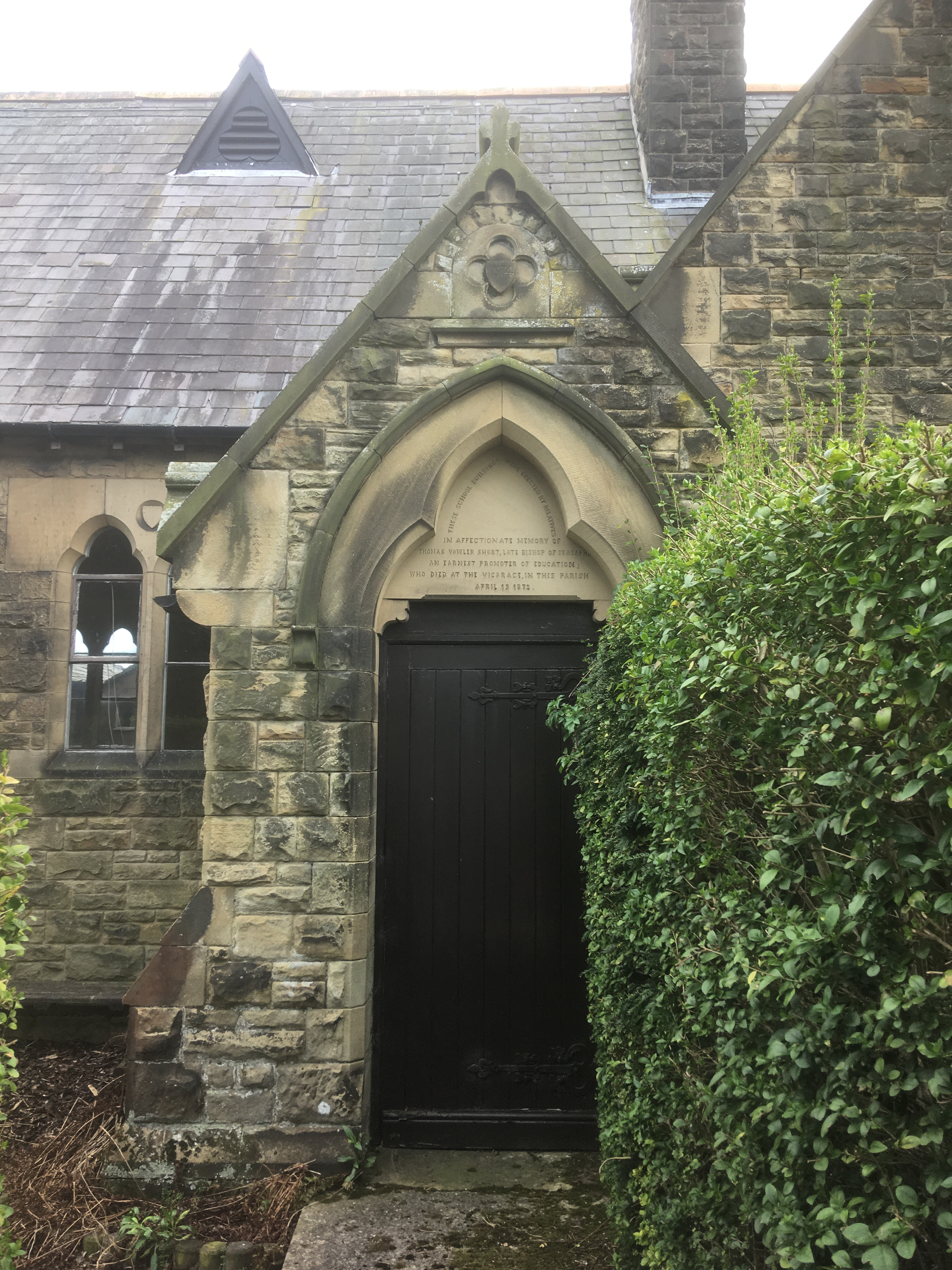
The dedication to Thomas Vowler Short above the school doorway

All Saints Primary School was built in memory of Thomas Vowler Short. The inscription above the school door says, "These school buildings were erected by relatives in affectionate memory of Thomas Vowler Short, Late Bishop of St Asaph. An earnest promoter of education who died at the vicarage in this parish April 13, 1872."

== Thomas Vowler Short ==
Thomas Vowler Short was the Bishop of St Asaph between 1864 and his retirement in 1870. He was a theologian who taught at Christ Church, University of Oxford, where he knew some of those later involved in the Oxford Movement, including his pupil Edward Pusey, the then student John Henry Newman, and his friend John Keble. On 13 April 1872, he died at the Gresford Vicarage, the home of Archdeacon Wickham, his brother-in-law.

== Building ==
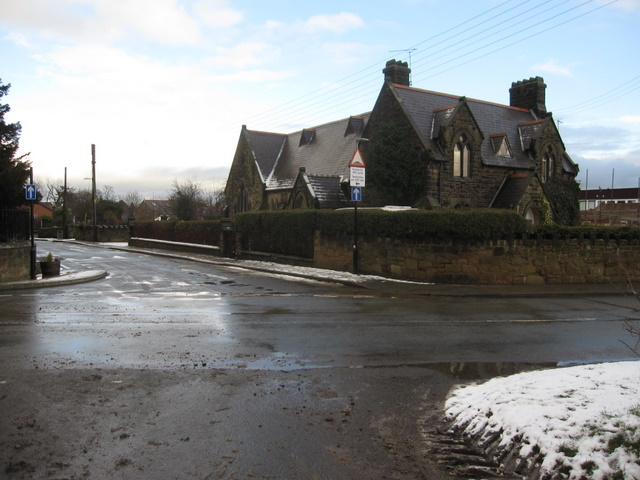
All Saints Primary School

The building costs £2,000, and was built on a field purchased from the Chapter of Winchester. It was designed to accommodate 120 boys. When it was opened, it was described as comprising a master's house and a schoolroom. The schoolroom measured 52′ 6′′ by 18′. The exterior stone was from the Moss Valley quarries. It also incorporated ornamental bricks and plain varnished woodwork. The architect was Edward Jones, the diocesan surveyor. The building contractor was Benjamin Owen of Chester. On Monday 12 October 1874, the school was opened by the Bishop of St Asaph. He made a speech about the school's architecture and his predecessor. On 3 June 1996, the building became Grade II listed as an example of Gothic revival style architecture.

== Contemporary use ==
The original schoolroom forms part of the All Saints' Voluntary Aided Church in Wales School but the schoolmaster's house is a private dwelling.
