= Jack Howell =

Jack Howell may refer to:

- Jack Howell (baseball) (born 1961), former Major League Baseball third baseman
- Jack Howell (footballer) (1924–1994), Australian rules footballer
- Jack Howell (physician) (1926–2015), British physician
- Jack Howell (swimmer) (1899–1967), American Olympic swimmer
- Jack P. Howell (1895–1971), Australian rules footballer
- Jack Howell (triathlete) (born 2004), Australian para-triathlete

== See also ==
- John Howell (disambiguation)
