= Thomas Vowler Short =

English bishop

The Right Reverend Thomas Vowler Short
- Bishop of St Asaph
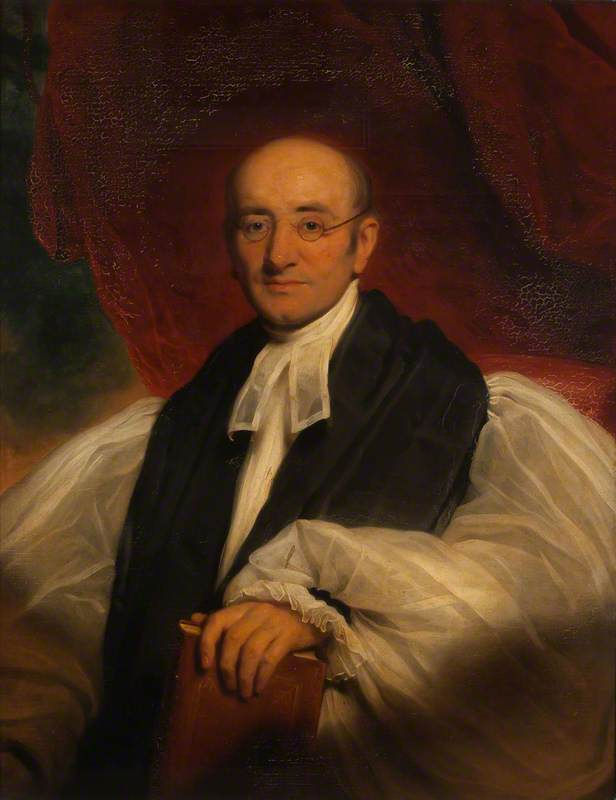
- Diocese: Diocese of St Asaph
- In office: 1846–1870
- Predecessor: William Carey
- Successor: Joshua Hughes
- Other post: Bishop of Sodor and Man (1841–1846)

Personal details
- Born: 16 September 1790 Dawlish, Devon
- Died: 13 April 1872 (aged 81)
- Denomination: Anglican
- Spouse: Mary Davies (m.1833)
- Profession: Clergyman, academic
- Education: Westminster School
- Alma mater: Christ Church, Oxford

Thomas Vowler Short (16 September 1790 – 13 April 1872) was an English academic and clergyman, successively Bishop of Sodor and Man and Bishop of St Asaph.

== Life ==
He was the eldest son of William Short, Archdeacon of Cornwall, with Elizabeth Hodgkinson, and was born at Dawlish, Devon, where his father was then curate. After spending a year at Exeter grammar school Short was sent to Westminster School in 1803. He went with a studentship to Christ Church, Oxford, in 1809. He took a first class in classics and in mathematics in 1812, and in the following year was ordained deacon by the bishop of Oxford. He graduated B.A. 1813, M.A. 1815, B.D. 1824, D.D. 1837. He married Mary Conybeare in 1833.

In 1814 Short became perpetual curate of Drayton, Oxfordshire, but he resigned this post to concentrate on a college tutorship. Circumstances, however, led him to become in 1816 the incumbent of Cowley, Oxfordshire; in 1823 of Stockleigh Pomeroy, Devon; and in 1826 of Kingsworthy, Hampshire. In 1821 he was Whitehall preacher. At Christ Church he became successively tutor and censor (1816–29), librarian (1823), catechist and Busby lecturer (1825), and in 1823 he served as proctor. He worked to improve the examination system at Oxford, but the changes he sought were not effected until after he had ceased to reside.

Though Short left Christ Church before the Oxford Movement really began, he was intimate with most of its leaders. Edward Pusey, a favourite pupil, acknowledged his influence, with affection and respect. Short examined John Henry Newman for his degree, and John Keble was among his close friends.

In 1829 Short went to reside at Kingsworthy, but in 1831 he accepted an offer from Lord Chancellor Brougham of the rectory of St George's, Bloomsbury. He married, in 1833, Mary (Davies), widow of John Conybeare. In 1837 he was appointed deputy clerk of the closet to Queen Victoria, and four years later bishop of Sodor and Man. During an episcopate of five years Short mainly resided in the diocese, visiting the parishes and promoting the education of candidates for holy orders. In 1846 he was translated, on Lord John Russell's recommendation, to the see of St. Asaph. Here he for many years gave half of his episcopal income towards the needs of the diocese. Short resigned the see in 1870.

On the 13 April 1872, Short died at the Gresford Vicarage. All Saints Primary School, Gresford, was built in his memory.

== Works ==
In addition to tracts and single sermons, Short published:

- 'Letters to an Aged Mother' (anon.), London, 1811.
- 'Twenty Sermons on the Fundamental Truths of Christianity,' Oxford, 1829
- 'Sketch of the History of the Church of England,' Oxford, 1832
- 'Sadoc and Miriam' (anon.), London, 1832

Church of England titles
Preceded by Henry Pepys	Bishop of Sodor and Man; 1841–1846	Succeeded by Walter Shirley
Preceded by William Carey	Bishop of St Asaph; 1846–1870	Succeeded by Joshua Hughes
