= John Bruce Howell =

- Born: June 17, 1941; Greensburg, Pennsylvania
- Died: February 28, 1997 (aged 55); Iowa City, Iowa
- Education: University of Michigan
- Occupations: Librarian and bibliographer

John Bruce Howell (June 17, 1941 – February 28, 1997) was an American librarian and bibliographer. He was Africana and International Studies Bibliographer at the University of Iowa Libraries, a profilfic bibliographic author, and "a national leader in Africana librarianship".

== Life ==
Howell gained his B.A. from Columbia University in 1965 and an M.A. in library science from the University of Michigan the following year. Between 1969 and 1980 he held various positions at the Library of Congress. In 1984 he completed a PhD in library and information science from the University of Illinois Urbana-Champaign, and he joined the University of Iowa in 1985.

== Works ==
- East African Community: subject guide to official publications, (Library of Congress, 1976)
- Tanganyika African National Union: a guide to publications by and about TANU, (Library of Congress, 1976)
- Kenya: subject guide to official publications, (Library of Congress, 1978)
- Zanzibar's Afro-Shirazi Party, 1957-1977: a bibliography, (Library of Congress, 1978)
- Style manuals of the English-speaking world: a guide, 1983 ISBN 0897740890
- A history of the Dublin Library Society, 1791-1881, 1985 ISBN 077030172X
- Third World/Iowa: books, journals, maps, and microforms about 138 developing countries acquired by the University of Iowa Libraries, 1980-1986, 1987 ISBN 0874140544
- Rural health in Kenya: a guide to the literature, 1988 ISBN 0874140668
- Index to the African studies review/bulletin and the ASA review of books, 1958-1990, 1991 ISBN 0918456665
- Guides, collections, and ancillary materials to African archival resources in the United States, 1996 ISBN 0942615328
