= Peter Bailey Williams =

Peter Bailey Williams (August 1763 – 22 November 1836) was a Welsh Anglican priest and amateur antiquarian. It is also claimed that he led the first rock climb recorded in the United Kingdom.

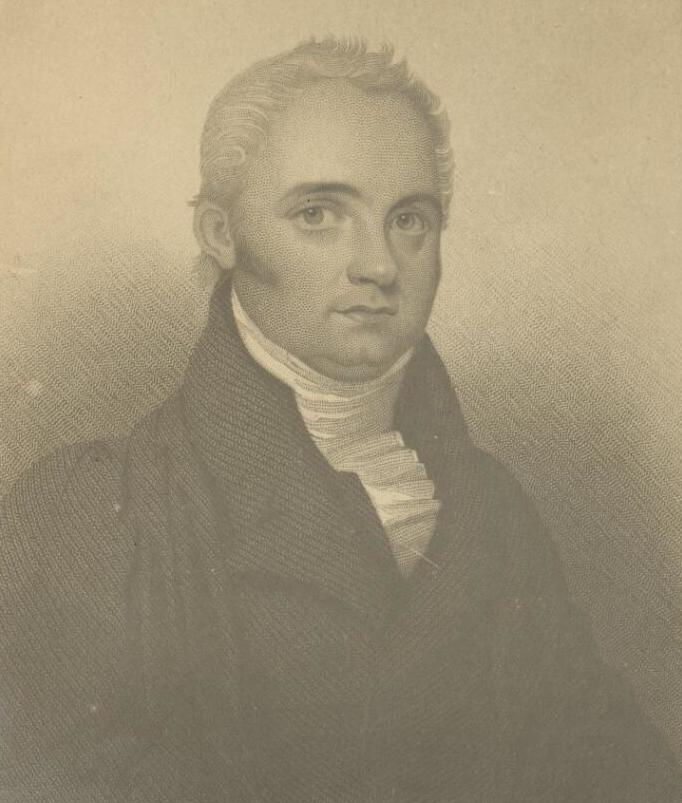
Portrait of Peter Bailey Williams (4673911) (cropped)

== Life ==
Williams was the son of Peter Williams, one of the early leaders of the Welsh Methodist revival, a pioneering bible publisher and biblical commentator. He was born in Llandyfaelog, Carmarthenshire, west Wales. After being educated at the grammar school in Carmarthen, he studied at the University of Oxford, matriculating from Jesus College, Oxford in 1785 and graduating with a Bachelor of Arts degree from Christ Church, Oxford in 1790. He was ordained in 1788 and served in Eastleach Martin (Gloucestershire), Swinbrook and Burford (both in Oxfordshire) before becoming rector of Llanrug and Llanberis in Caernarfonshire, north Wales, holding these posts until his death on 22 November 1836. His son, Henry Bayley Williams, later became rector of Llanrug and Llanberis.

In addition to his parish duties, Williams wrote for journals and assisted both young and more established writers with historical information for their work. He copied several manuscripts of medieval poems, but his antiquarian work was not highly regarded. He contributed to The Tourist's Guide to the County of Carnarvon (1821) and established the first Sunday school in the county, at Llanrug in 1793.
