= James Conway Brown =

Welsh musician

James Conway Brown (1838 – 1908) was a Welsh musician. His father was also called James Brown, and was one of the proprietors of the Blaina iron-works, Monmouthshire for a time.

James attended Camberwell Collegiate School and King's College London, before joining his uncle, Thomas Brown, managing director of Ebbw Vale iron-works at Ebbw Vale to train as an Iron-master. He was more interested in music however, and performed as a pianist, violinist, and also as an organist in a number of places of worship.

After deciding to leave his business career for a career in music, he was appointed, in 1869, organist of Aldershot parish church. In 1875 he took up a position as organist of Hale church, near Farnham, and in 1879, of the parish church of Farnham.

His published works include a sonata in E major for violin and pianoforte; this work was awarded the Sir Michael Costa prize by the Trinity College of Music, London. He died in April 1908.
