= Adrian Stephens =

English engineer (1795–1876)

Adrian Stephens (1795 – 25 December 1876) was an English engineer, noted for inventing the steam whistle in 1833.

Stephens was born in the Penzance area of Cornwall and came to Merthyr Tydfil, Wales, in 1827 to work at the Dowlais ironworks. The purpose of his invention was to act as a warning device on the boilers, and an early example can be seen in the museum at Cyfarthfa Castle. Stephens did not patent the device, and it was adopted by the Liverpool & Manchester Railway after it had been seen in operation at Dowlais in 1835.
