= John Howell (poet) =

Welsh poet

- Born: 1774; Abergwili
- Died: 18 November 1830 (aged 55–56)

John Howell (also known as Ioan ab Hywel or Ioan Glandyfroedd; 1774–1830) was a soldier, editor and Welsh-language poet. He is most famous for collecting the works of Carmarthenshire poets and publishing them in the volume Blodau Dyfed in 1824.

== Early life ==
Howell was born in 1774 at Abergwili, Carmarthenshire, where he received very little schooling but was apprenticed to a weaver.

== Career ==
Howell joined the Carmarthenshire militia, where, due to his interest in music, he was employed in the band as fife-major. He served with his regiment in Ireland in 1799 and 1803. During this time, Howell improved his education, taking a particular interest in Welsh poetry and mathematical science.

Howell was discharged on 24 July 1815 and moved to Llandovery, Carmarthenshire, becoming the headmaster of the national school.

While working as a teacher, Howell wrote poems and songs, which he sent to various eisteddfodau. He submitted his ode to Thomas Picton, On the death of the outstanding military officer, Sir Thomas Picton, to the Carmarthen Eisteddfod of 1819 and it was published in Awen Dyfed (1822).

In 1824, he brought out a selection of compositions of past and present bards from Carmarthenshire called Blodau Dyfed (translated: The Flowers of Dyfed). It also featured nineteen pieces of Howell's own work, including Carmarthen March.

Howell's Ar y Duke of Gloucester's March appeared in William Thomas' collection of songs in 1851.

Howell visited local churches, instructing the choristers in psalmody.

== Personal life ==
Howell was said to have a "considerable fund of anecdote" and a "friendly and cheerful disposition".

== Death ==
John Howell died on 18 November 1830 in Llandovery after a lingering illness, believed to be cancer. He was buried beside the porch of Llandingat Church.
