= John Jenkinson (bishop) =

English bishop (1781–1840)

- Bishop of St David's
- Church: Church of England
- See: Diocese of St David's
- In office: 23 July 1825 – 7 July 1840
- Predecessor: Thomas Burgess
- Successor: Connop Thirlwall

Personal details
- Born: 2 September 1781 Winchester
- Died: 7 July 1840 (aged 58) Great Malvern
- Spouse: Frances Augusta Pechell
- Education: Christ Church, Oxford

John Banks Jenkinson (2 September 1781 – 7 July 1840) was an English bishop who was the Bishop of St David's from 1825.

== Life ==
The second son of John Jenkinson, by Frances, daughter of Rear-admiral John Barker of Guildford, he was born at Winchester on 2 September 1781. His father was the brother of Charles Jenkinson, 1st Earl of Liverpool, a colonel in the army, joint secretary for Ireland and gentleman-usher to Queen Charlotte; he died on 1 May 1805.

Jenkinson was educated at Winchester College, where he was elected scholar in 1793. On 22 December 1800 he matriculated at Christ Church, Oxford, graduated B.A. in 1804 and proceeded M.A. in 1807 and D.D. in 1817. He became a prebendary of Worcester Cathedral on 30 August 1808, rector of Leverington, Cambridgeshire, on 8 July 1812, Dean of Worcester on 28 November 1817 and Master of St. Oswald's Hospital, Worcester, on 8 January 1818. During his time as master, the hospital's running came under scrutiny.

On 23 July 1825, Jenkinson was elected Bishop of St David's, and on 4 August 1825 was appointed canon of Durham Cathedral. On 13 June 1827 he became Dean of Durham, and held the deanery, then worth £9,000 a year, with his bishopric for the remainder of his life.Described by Owen Chadwick as a moderate, he was one of the bishops voting for the second reading of the Great Reform Bill of 1832.

He died at Great Malvern on 7 July 1840, and was buried in Worcester Cathedral. Jenkinson maintained a school for the children of the poor at Carmarthen, which usually contained 150 scholars. He published some sermons.

== Family ==
He married, on 8 April 1813, Frances Augusta, daughter of Augustus Pechell of Berkhampstead, Hertfordshire, and by her left two sons and two daughters. The eldest son, George Samuel Jenkinson, succeeded his uncle, Sir Charles, as eleventh baronet in 1855. A granddaughter was Viscountess Maidstone who funded much of the early twentieth century restoration of St David's Cathedral and whose tomb lies in the Cathedral's St Edward the Confessor Chapel.
