= Edward Copleston =

English churchman (1776–1849)

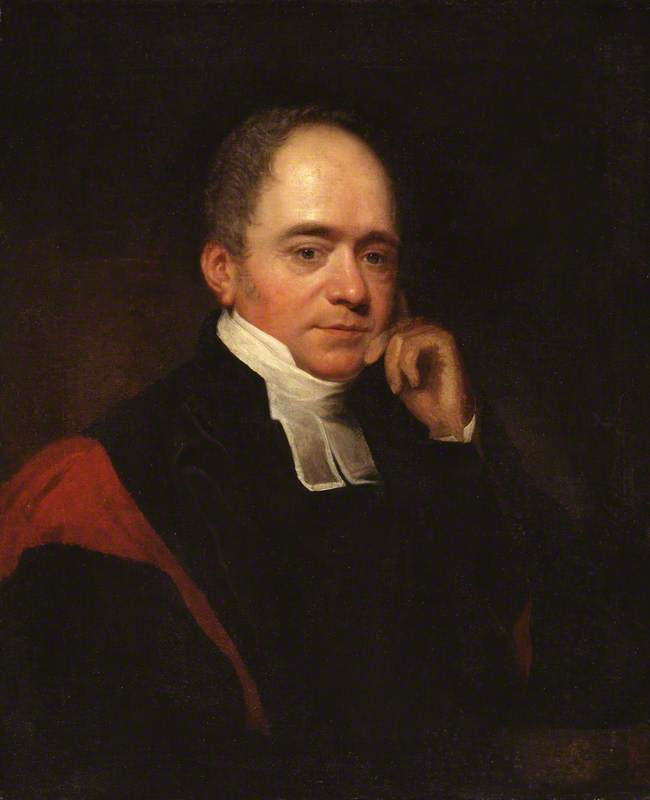
- Early 19th-century portrait of Edward Copleston by Thomas Phillips.

Bishop of Llandaff
- In office 1827–1849

Dean of Chester
- In office 1826-?

Personal details
- Born: 2 February 1776 Offwell, Devon, England
- Died: 14 October 1849 (aged 73)
- Education: Corpus Christi College, Oxford

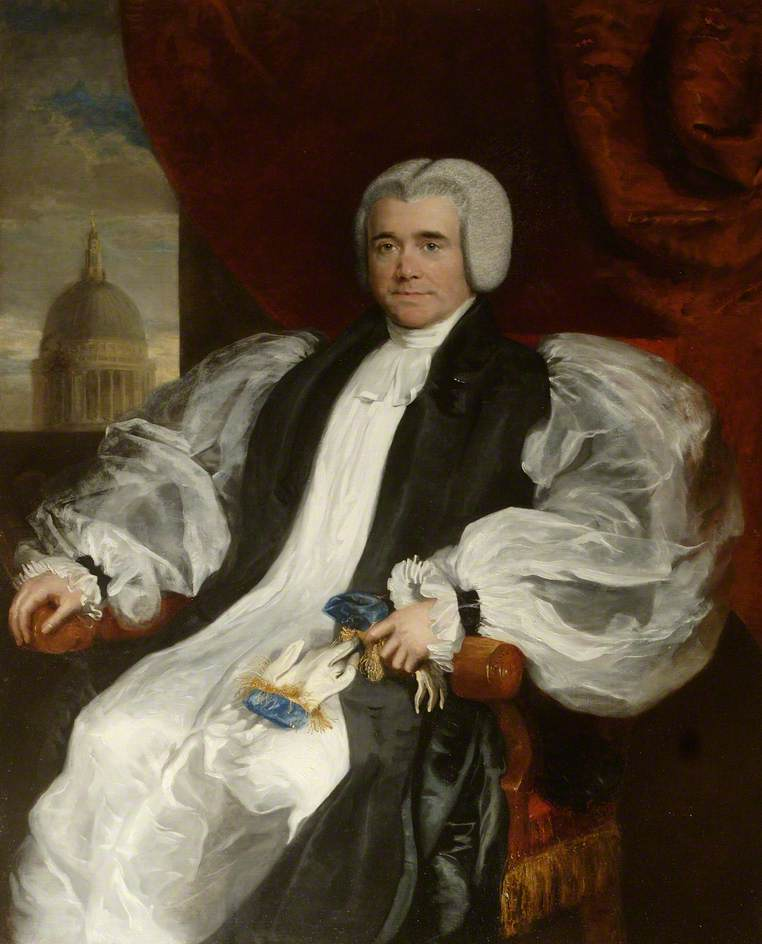
Bishop Copleston by Martin Archer Shee.

Edward Copleston (2 February 1776 – 14 October 1849) was an English churchman and academic, Provost of Oriel College, Oxford, from 1814 till 1828 and Bishop of Llandaff from 1827.

== Life ==
Born into an ancient West Country family, Copleston was born at Offwell in Devon, and educated at Corpus Christi College, Oxford, to which he gained a scholarship at the age of 15.

He was elected to a tutorship at Oriel College, Oxford, in 1797, and in 1800 was appointed to St Mary Hall, Oxford and also became Vicar of the University Church of St Mary the Virgin, Oxford. As Oxford Professor of Poetry (1802–1812) he gained a reputation by his literary criticism and sound latinity.

After holding the office of dean at Oriel for some years, he succeeded to the provostship in 1814, and owing largely to his influence the college reached a remarkable degree of prosperity during the first quarter of the 19th century. He was influential in the choice of Fellows who were in due course to become prominent during the Oxford Movement, though he himself was of a more rationalist cast of mind and belonged to the group of so-called Oriel Noetics.

In 1826 he was appointed Dean of Chester, and in the next year he was consecrated Bishop of Llandaff. Here he gave his support to the new movement for church restoration in Wales, and during his occupation of the see more than twenty new churches were built in the diocese. The political problems of the time interested him greatly, and his writings include two letters to Sir Robert Peel, one dealing with the 'Variable Standard of Value', the other with the 'Increase of Pauperism' (Oxford, 1819).

The palace of the Bishops of Llandaff (at Mathern, Monmouthshire) had been sold so Copleston resided occasionally at Llandough Castle near Cowbridge and passed his later life between the Deanery of St.Paul's and Hardwick House in Chepstow, where he died.

His great-grandson, John Copleston, was also a clergyman.

== Notes ==
Academic offices
Preceded by John Eveleigh	Provost of Oriel College, Oxford; 1814–1828	Succeeded by Edward Hawkins
Church of England titles
Preceded by Charles Sumner	Bishop of Llandaff; 1827–1849	Succeeded by Alfred Ollivant
