= William Carey (bishop) =

British bishop

The Right Reverend William Carey
- Bishop of St Asaph
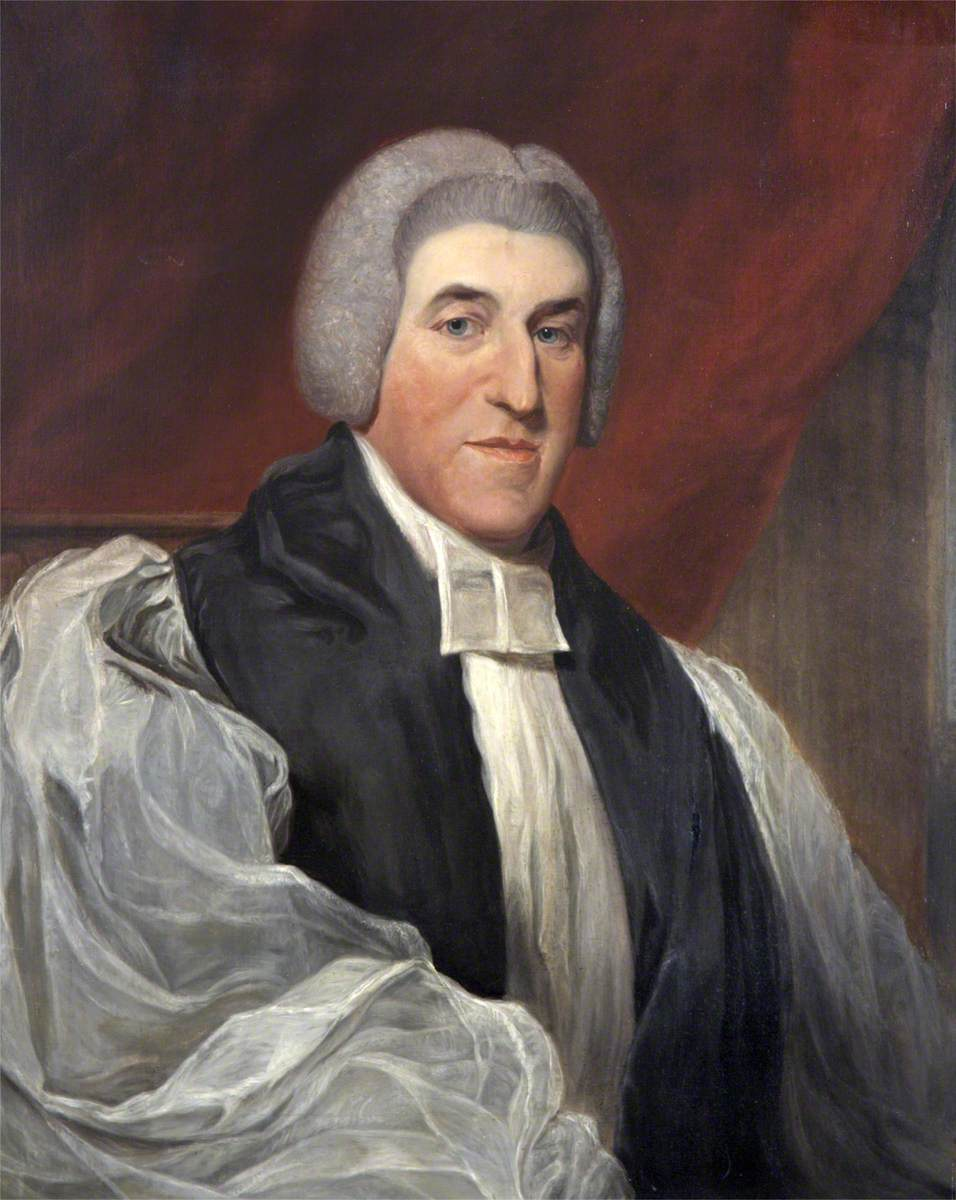
- Diocese: Diocese of St Asaph
- Elected: 1830
- Term ended: 1846 (death)
- Predecessor: John Luxmoore
- Successor: Thomas Vowler Short
- Other post: Bishop of Exeter (1820–1830)

Personal details
- Born: 18 November 1769
- Died: 13 September 1846 (aged 76) Marylebone, London
- Buried: St Asaph Cathedral
- Denomination: Anglican
- Education: Westminster School; Christ Church, Oxford

William Carey (18 November 1769 – 13 September 1846) was an English churchman and headmaster, Bishop of Exeter and Bishop of St Asaph.

== Life ==
He was born in 1769. His success in life was due to William Vincent, by whose help he was admitted to Westminster School; in 1784 he was elected a king's scholar, in 1788 he became the captain of the school, and in the following year he was elected to Christ Church, Oxford, which was at that time presided over by Cyril Jackson. He took the degree of M.A. in 1796. and became a tutor of his house, where he also filled the office of censor from 1798 to 1802. While connected with Oxford life he held the incumbency of the neighbouring church of Cowley, and near the close of his academic career, in 1801, he was nominated one of the preachers at Whitehall Chapel. The prebendal stall of Knaresborough-cum-Bickhill in York Cathedral was conferred on him in 1804, and he instituted to the vicarage of Sutton-in-the-Forest.

Through the influential support of Cyril Jackson, Carey was appointed to the head-mastership of Westminster School in January 1803, staying until December 1814. He proceeded to the degree of B.D. in 1804, and to that of D.D. in 1807. The honorary post of sub-almoner to the king was given to him in 1808, and in March 1809 he received a prebend at Westminster. On resigning his position at his old school he withdrew to his country living, residing there until 1820, when he was called to preside over the diocese of Exeter. At Exeter he remained for ten years, when he was translated to St Asaph, being elected to his new see on 12 March 1830 and confirmed on 7 April. He died at his house in Portland Place, London, on 13 September 1846, but his body was carried into Wales and buried in the churchyard of St, Asaph Cathedral on 2 October 1846. A monument to his memory was erected in his cathedral.

He made a large benefaction of £20,000 to Christ Church, for the maintenance of Old Westminsters preparing themselves for holy orders. He also gave new scenery for the Westminster school play to replace the sets designed by Athenian Stuart. Carey's scenery was in use for fifty years, from 1808 to 1858.

Church of England titles
Preceded by George Pelham	Bishop of Exeter; 1820–1830	Succeeded by Christopher Bethell
Preceded by John Luxmoore	Bishop of St Asaph; 1830–1846	Succeeded by Thomas Vowler Short
