= 1907 in Wales =

- Centuries: 18th; 19th; 20th; 21st
- Decades: 1880s; 1890s; 1900s; 1910s; 1920s
- See also: List of years in Wales; Timeline of Welsh history 1907 in The United Kingdom Scotland Elsewhere

This article is about the particular significance of the year 1907 to Wales and its people.

== Incumbents ==
- Archdruid of the National Eisteddfod of Wales – Dyfed
- Lord Lieutenant of Anglesey – Sir Richard Henry Williams-Bulkeley, 12th Baronet
- Lord Lieutenant of Brecknockshire – Joseph Bailey, 2nd Baron Glanusk
- Lord Lieutenant of Caernarvonshire – John Ernest Greaves
- Lord Lieutenant of Cardiganshire – Herbert Davies-Evans
- Lord Lieutenant of Carmarthenshire – Sir James Williams-Drummond, 4th Baronet
- Lord Lieutenant of Denbighshire – William Cornwallis-West
- Lord Lieutenant of Flintshire – Hugh Robert Hughes
- Lord Lieutenant of Glamorgan – Robert Windsor-Clive, 1st Earl of Plymouth
- Lord Lieutenant of Merionethshire – W. R. M. Wynne
- Lord Lieutenant of Monmouthshire – Godfrey Morgan, 1st Viscount Tredegar
- Lord Lieutenant of Montgomeryshire – Sir Herbert Williams-Wynn, 7th Baronet
- Lord Lieutenant of Pembrokeshire – Frederick Campbell, 3rd Earl Cawdor
- Lord Lieutenant of Radnorshire – Powlett Milbank
- Bishop of Bangor – Watkin Williams
- Bishop of Llandaff – Joshua Pritchard Hughes
- Bishop of St Asaph – A. G. Edwards (later Archbishop of Wales)
- Bishop of St Davids – John Owen

== Events ==
- 3 January – Formal opening of the residence at St Deiniol's Library.
- 17 February – The cargo ship SS Orianda sinks off Barry after colliding with the SS Heliopolis, with the loss of 14 crew.
- 5 March – Six miners are killed in a shaft accident at Windsor Colliery, Abertridwr.
- 19 March – The National Library of Wales (Aberystwyth) and National Museum of Wales (Cardiff) receive their charters.
- 11 May – Swansea Corporation's newly constructed Cray Reservoir is filled with water for the first time.
- 11 July – Edward VII visits Bangor to lay the foundation stone of the new University College of North Wales buildings. Principal Henry Reichel is knighted.
- 13 July – Opening of the Queen Alexandra Dock in Cardiff, attended by the King and Queen.
- 25 July – Francis Edwards, MP for Radnorshire, is created a baronet.
- 1 November – First performance of John Hughes' hymn tune "Cwm Rhondda" in its final version, at Capel Rhondda Welsh Baptist Chapel, Hopkinstown, Pontypridd with the composer at the (new) organ.
- 10 November – Five miners are killed in an accident at Seven Sisters Colliery.
- 14 December – Seven miners are killed in an accident at Dinas Main Colliery, Gilfach Goch.
- December – Edgeworth David joins Ernest Shackleton’s Nimrod Expedition to the South Pole.
- date unknown
  - Owen Morgan Edwards becomes Chief Inspector of Schools for Wales.
  - The Board of Education establishes a special Welsh department.
  - C. H. Watkins designs and builds the first aircraft in Wales at Cardiff, and names it Robin Goch.
  - Opening of Dolgarrog hydroelectric power station.
  - Oakdale Colliery is sunk in the Sirhowy Valley.
  - The silver and lead mine at Llywernog reopens in order to prospect for zinc.

== Arts and literature ==
=== Awards ===
- National Eisteddfod of Wales – held in Swansea
  - Chair – Thomas Davies, "John Bunyan"
  - Crown – John Dyfnallt Owen

=== New books ===
==== English language ====
- Eliot Crawshay-Williams – Across Persia
- W. H. Davies – New Poems
- Arthur Machen – The Hill of Dreams

==== Welsh language ====
- Emyr Davies – Llwyn Hudol
- John Jones (Myrddin Fardd) – Gwerin-Eiriau Sir Gaernarfon
- John Morris-Jones – Caniadau
- Joshua Thomas – Hanes y Bedyddwyr
- T. Marchant Williams – Odlau Serch a Bywyd

=== Music ===
- T. Hopkin Evans – Crowns of Golden Light and The Voyage
- John Hughes – "Cwm Rhondda" (hymn tune, final version)
- David Vaughan Thomas – Llyn y Fan

== Architecture ==
- St David's Hotel, a hotel for golfers located at Harlech, in Gwynedd, is designed to plans by the Glasgow School architect George Henry Walton for a syndicate of entrepreneurs of which he was a member. (The proposals were subsequently revised in 1908, and the hotel was built in 1910. The hotel closed in 2008, and planning permission for demolition was approved in 2009).

== Sport ==
- Bowls – The Welsh Open Bowls Championship is launched.
- Boxing
  - 1 June – Jim Driscoll wins the British featherweight title.
  - 8 August – Joe White wins the British welterweight title (disputed).
- Rugby league
  - Ebbw Vale RLFC and Merthyr Tydfil RLFC are formed, the first Welsh rugby league teams.
- Rugby union
  - Wales finish second in the 1907 Home Nations Championship
  - 1 January – Cardiff beat the touring South Africa national team, 17 - 0.

== Births ==
- 3 January – Ray Milland, actor (died 1986)
- 10 January – Nicholas Evans, artist (died 2004)
- 11 January – Reg Thomas, athlete (died 1946)
- 4 March – Emlyn John, footballer (died 1962)
- 6 April – Jacques Vaillant de Guélis, Special Operations Executive agent (died 1945)
- 30 April – Harry Bowcott, international rugby player and president of the Welsh Rugby Union (died 2004)
- 7 May – Trevil Morgan, cricketer (died 1976)
- 24 May – Gwyn Jones, writer (died 1999)
- June – David Llewellyn, trade unionist (died after 1956)
- 8 June – Trevor Thomas, art historian and author (died 1993)
- 10 June – Ernie Curtis, footballer (died 1992)
- 19 June – Rodney David, cricketer (died 1969)
- 2 July – Dick Duckfield, cricketer (died 1959)
- 12 August – Rhys Lloyd, Baron Lloyd of Kilgerran, politician (died 1991)
- 25 August – Albert Fear, Wales international rugby player (died 2000)
- 25 September – Raymond Glendenning, radio sports commentator (died 1974)
- 30 September – Arthur Probert, politician (died 1975)
- 27 November – Glyn Prosser, Wales international rugby player (died 1972)
- 9 December – T. J. Morgan, academic (died 1986)
- 10 December – Harry Payne, Wales international rugby player (died 2000)
- 19 December – William Glynne-Jones, novelist and children's writer (died 1977)
- 21 December – Will Roberts, painter (died 2000)
- 22 December – Harold Jones, rugby player (died 1955)
- 23 December – Fred Warren, international footballer (died 1986)
- 26 December – Guy Morgan, rugby player and cricketer (died 1973)

== Deaths ==
- 7 January – David Rowlands (Dewi Môn), minister, academic and writer, 70
- 13 January – Frances Elizabeth Wynne, artist, 71
- 10 March – George Douglas-Pennant, 2nd Baron Penrhyn, industrialist and politician, 70
- 24 March – John Pugh, minister (Forward Movement)
- 2 June – Rose Mary Crawshay, philanthropist, 79
- 5 July – John Romilly Allen, archaeologist, 60
- 14 August
  - David Treharne Evans, Lord Mayor of London, 58
  - Rhoda Willis, baby farmer and murderess, 40, hanged – last woman executed in Wales
- October – Hugh Davies (Pencerdd Maelor), composer, 63
- 27 September – Alfred Davies, businessman and politician, 58
- 29 October – Megan Watts Hughes, singer, 65
- 11 November – Ralph Sweet-Escott, English-born Wales rugby international and Glamorgan cricketer, 38
- 12 November – Sir Lewis Morris, Anglo-Welsh poet, 74
- 27 November – Cyril Flower, 1st Baron Battersea, politician, 64
- 30 November – John Price, footballer, 52/3

== See also ==
- 1907 in Ireland
