= 1900 in Wales =

- Centuries: 17th; 18th; 19th; 20th; 21st
- Decades: 1880s; 1890s; 1900s; 1910s; 1920s
- See also: List of years in Wales; Timeline of Welsh history 1900 in The United Kingdom Scotland Elsewhere

This article is about the particular significance of the year 1900 to Wales and its people.

== Incumbents ==
- Archdruid of the National Eisteddfod of Wales – Hwfa Môn
- Lord Lieutenant of Anglesey – Sir Richard Henry Williams-Bulkeley, 12th Baronet
- Lord Lieutenant of Brecknockshire – Joseph Bailey, 1st Baron Glanusk
- Lord Lieutenant of Caernarvonshire – John Ernest Greaves
- Lord Lieutenant of Cardiganshire – Herbert Davies-Evans
- Lord Lieutenant of Carmarthenshire – Sir James Williams-Drummond, 4th Baronet
- Lord Lieutenant of Denbighshire – William Cornwallis-West
- Lord Lieutenant of Flintshire – Hugh Robert Hughes
- Lord Lieutenant of Glamorgan – Robert Windsor-Clive, 1st Earl of Plymouth
- Lord Lieutenant of Merionethshire – W. R. M. Wynne
- Lord Lieutenant of Monmouthshire – Godfrey Morgan, 1st Viscount Tredegar
- Lord Lieutenant of Montgomeryshire – Sir Herbert Williams-Wynn, 7th Baronet
- Lord Lieutenant of Pembrokeshire – Frederick Campbell, 3rd Earl Cawdor
- Lord Lieutenant of Radnorshire – Powlett Milbank
- Bishop of Bangor – Watkin Williams (from 2 February)
- Bishop of Llandaff – Richard Lewis
- Bishop of St Asaph – A. G. Edwards (later Archbishop of Wales)
- Bishop of St Davids – John Owen

== Events ==
- 6 January – In Merionethshire, for the first time in centuries, the sword of the Gorsedd bards is solemnly unsheathed. "The chief bard invoked the blessing of God on British arms in South Africa, and announced that the sword would not be sheathed again till the triumph of the forces of righteousness over the hordes of evil."
- 3 January – Royal Yacht Victoria and Albert almost capsizes while being floated out of dry dock at Pembroke Dock on completion of her construction.
- 4 April – An anarchist shoots at Albert Edward, Prince of Wales, during his visit to Belgium for the birthday celebrations of the King of Belgium.
- 14 May – A pedestrian tunnel is opened under the River Ely from Cardiff to Penarth Dock.
- June – The Royal Welch Fusiliers form the largest contingent in the multinational coalition forces helping to relieve the siege of Peking during the Boxer Rebellion.
- 1 June – Colwyn Bay Pier opened.
- 9 July – The Dowlais Iron Company and Arthur Keen's Patent Nut and Bolt Company merged to form Guest, Keen & Co. Ltd.
- August – Taff Vale Railway strike.
- 16 September – The German steamship, Stormarn, and the Gordon Castle collide in fog in Cardigan Bay with the loss of 20 lives.
- 26 September - 24 October – United Kingdom general election, in which:
  - Keir Hardie is elected for Merthyr Tydfil, one of the first Labour MPs in Britain;
  - Frederick Rutherfoord Harris becomes Conservative MP for Monmouth Boroughs;
  - Francis Edwards regains Radnorshire for the Liberals;
  - George Newnes becomes MP for Swansea Town;
  - Edward James Reed regains Cardiff;
  - Sir Henry Morton Stanley retires from Parliament.
- 7 November – The steamer City of Vienna sinks off Swansea with the loss of 20 crew members. There is one survivor.
- 22 November – Beginning of the long-running Penrhyn Quarry industrial dispute.
- 28 December – The barque Primrose Hill is wrecked on South Stack off Holyhead, with the loss of 33 lives.
- The 'Long Bridge' at Risca, formerly part of the Monmouthshire Canal, is demolished.
- The Aberdare Canal is closed as economically unviable.
- A small zoo in Victoria Park, Cardiff, opens.
- The United States census figures show a Welsh immigrant population totalling 93,744, plus 173,416 children — an all-time high.

== Arts and literature ==
=== Awards ===
- National Eisteddfod of Wales – held in Liverpool
  - Chair – John Owen Williams, "Y Bugail"
  - Crown – John Thomas Job, "Williams Pantycelyn"

=== New books ===
- Owen Morgan Edwards – Tro yn Llydaw
- David Brynmor Jones and John Rhys – The Welsh People
- Allen Raine – Garthowen
- Ernest Rhys – The Whistling Maid
- R. Silyn Roberts and W. J. Gruffydd – Telynegion
- Bertrand Russell – A Critical Exposition of the Philosophy of Leibniz

=== Music ===
- Sir Walford Davies – Four Songs of Innocence

== Sport ==
- 24 February – Association football – Wales lose 2–0 to Ireland in Llandudno.
- Rugby union – Wales win the Triple Crown.
- Yachting – Cardiff Yacht Club is formed in Butetown.

== Births ==
- 18 January – Idris Jones Wales rugby union international (died 1971)
- 23 January – William Ifor Jones, conductor (died 1988)
- 9 February – David Williams, historian (died 1978)
- 19 April – Richard Hughes, novelist (died 1976)
- 2 June – David Wynne, composer (died 1983)
- 30 June – Idwal Jones, politician (died 1982)
- 27 August – Frank Moody, British boxing champion (died 1963)
- 2 September – Bobby Delahay, Wales rugby union captain (died 1978)
- 1 November – Eiluned Lewis, writer (died 1979)
- 12 November – Thomas Hollingdale, Wales rugby union international (died 1978)
- 28 November – Trevor Roberts, 2nd Baron Clwyd, lawyer (died 1987)
- date unknown – Horace Williams, footballer (died 1960)

== Deaths ==
- 20 January – R. D. Blackmore, English novelist of Anglo-Welsh parentage, 74
- 22 January – David E. Hughes, musician and professor of music, 68
- 26 February – Daniel Grey, doctor and footballer, 51
- 22 March – Thomas Charles Edwards, Presbyterian leader, 62
- 10 May – Philip Ellis, Tractarian, 77
- 14 June – Catherine Gladstone (née Glynne), wife of British Prime Minister, William Ewart Gladstone, 88
- 19 September – Anne Beale, novelist, 84
- 9 October – John Crichton-Stuart, 3rd Marquess of Bute, owner of Cardiff Castle and Castell Coch, 53
- 12 December (in Edinburgh) – William Williams, veterinary surgeon, 68

== See also ==
- 1900 in Ireland
