= 1905 in Wales =

- Centuries: 18th; 19th; 20th; 21st
- Decades: 1880s; 1890s; 1900s; 1910s; 1920s
- See also: List of years in Wales; Timeline of Welsh history 1905 in The United Kingdom Scotland Elsewhere

This article is about the particular significance of the year 1905 to Wales and its people.

== Incumbents ==
- Archdruid of the National Eisteddfod of Wales – Hwfa Môn
- Lord Lieutenant of Anglesey – Sir Richard Henry Williams-Bulkeley, 12th Baronet
- Lord Lieutenant of Brecknockshire – Joseph Bailey, 1st Baron Glanusk (until 19 December); Joseph Bailey, 2nd Baron Glanusk (from 19 December)
- Lord Lieutenant of Caernarvonshire – John Ernest Greaves
- Lord Lieutenant of Cardiganshire – Herbert Davies-Evans
- Lord Lieutenant of Carmarthenshire – Sir James Williams-Drummond, 4th Baronet
- Lord Lieutenant of Denbighshire – William Cornwallis-West
- Lord Lieutenant of Flintshire – Hugh Robert Hughes
- Lord Lieutenant of Glamorgan – Robert Windsor-Clive, 1st Earl of Plymouth
- Lord Lieutenant of Merionethshire – W. R. M. Wynne
- Lord Lieutenant of Monmouthshire – Godfrey Morgan, 1st Viscount Tredegar
- Lord Lieutenant of Montgomeryshire – Sir Herbert Williams-Wynn, 7th Baronet
- Lord Lieutenant of Pembrokeshire – Frederick Campbell, 3rd Earl Cawdor
- Lord Lieutenant of Radnorshire – Powlett Milbank
- Bishop of Bangor – Watkin Williams
- Bishop of Llandaff – Richard Lewis (until 24 January); Joshua Pritchard Hughes (from 1 June)
- Bishop of St Asaph – A. G. Edwards (later Archbishop of Wales)
- Bishop of St Davids – John Owen

== Events ==
- 31 January – 1904–1905 Welsh Revival: Rev Peter Price writes to the Western Mail, criticising the "so-called" revival led by Evan Roberts.
- 10 March – 33 men are killed in a mining accident at Cambrian Colliery, Clydach Vale, Rhondda.
- 29 March – Evan Roberts embarks on his first and only mission outside Wales, spending a three-week period in Liverpool.
- 27 May – Thomas Price becomes Premier of South Australia.
- 30 June – Opening of the Prichard Jones Institute at Newborough, Anglesey.
- 11 July – National Colliery disaster at Wattstown in the Rhondda: an underground explosion kills 120 men, with just one survivor.
- 28 August – The Dyserth branch line is opened to passengers.
- 21 October - The centenary of the death of Horatio Nelson is commemorated in a ceremony at The Kymin. Participants include Lady Llangattock.
- 28 October - Edward VII grants city status to Cardiff, the only such grant of his reign.
- 10 December – David Lloyd George joins the new Liberal Cabinet of Sir Henry Campbell-Bannerman as President of the Board of Trade.
- 18 December – The earldom of Plymouth is revived in favour of Robert George Windsor-Clive, 14th Baron Windsor, who also becomes Viscount Windsor of St. Fagan's.
- 28 December – Godfrey Morgan is created Viscount Tredegar.
- Sir John Williams purchases the Peniarth manuscripts at the instigation of John Gwenogvryn Evans.

== Arts and literature ==
- Edward Morgan Humphreys joins the staff of Y Genedl Gymreig.

=== Awards ===
- National Eisteddfod of Wales – held in Mountain Ash
  - Chair – No winner
  - Crown – Thomas Mathonwy Davies

=== New books ===
==== English language ====
- David Ffrangcon Davies – The Singing of the Future
- W. H. Davies – The Soul's Destroyer
- Allen Raine - Hearts of Wales
- Owen Rhoscomyl – Flame-Bearers of Welsh History

==== Welsh language ====
- Gwaith Ann Griffiths (ed. Owen Morgan Edwards)
- John Jones (Myrddin Fardd) – Cynfeirdd Lleyn
- Gwyneth Vaughan - O Gorlannau'r Defaid
- John Watson – Yr Hen Ddoctor

=== Film ===
- The Life of Charles Peace made by Ifan ab Owen Edwards

=== Music ===
- David John de Lloyd is the first music graduate of University of Wales, Aberystwyth.
- John Hughes - "Cwm Rhondda" (hymn tune, first version, as "Rhondda")
- William Penfro Rowlands – "Blaenwern" (hymn tune)

== Sport ==
- Bowls – The [[Scuba Scuba Diving in BaliDiving in Bali]] is formed in Cardiff.
- Rugby union
  - 11 March – Wales win the Home Nations Championship and take the Triple Crown.
  - 16 December – Wales defeat the first touring New Zealand team at Cardiff Arms Park.

== Births ==
- 6 January – Idris Davies, poet (died 1953)
- 10 February – Rachel Thomas, actress (died 1995)
- 28 February – Glyn Jones, writer (died 1995)
- 1 March – Doris Hare, actress (died 2000)
- 18 April – Alun Oldfield-Davies, controller of BBC Wales (died 1988)
- 18 May – Thomas Jones Pierce, historian (died 1964)
- 28 June – Albert Clifford Williams, politician (died 1987)
- 11 July – Jack Bassett, Wales international rugby union player (died 1989)
- 2 August – Myrna Loy, actress of Welsh descent (died 1993)
- 13 August – Gareth Jones, journalist and advisor to David Lloyd George (died 1935)
- 28 August – Cyril Walters, cricketer (died 1992)
- 16 October – Barry Livesey, actor (died 1959)
- 31 October – W. F. Grimes, archaeologist (died 1988)
- 26 November – Emlyn Williams, dramatist and actor (died 1987)
- 10 December – John Edward Jones, Plaid Cymru leader (died 1970)
- 18 December – Stanley Cornwell Lewis, artist (died 2009)
- 22 December – Gwyn Richards, dual-code rugby player (died 1985)
- 29 December – Billy Williams, dual-code international rugby player (died 1973)

== Deaths ==
- 24 January – Richard Lewis, Bishop of Llandaff, 83
- 7 March – Robert Isaac Jones, pharmacist, writer and printer
- 14 March – Henry Paget, 5th Marquess of Anglesey, eccentric (died in Monte Carlo), 29
- 25 April – David Watkin Jones, poet, 73
- 29 May – Robert Franklin John, Welsh-born farmer and political figure in British Columbia, 54
- August/September – Peter Rees Jones, entrepreneur, 62
- 14 October – John Thomas, photographer, 67
- 15 October – Thomas Howells (Hywel Cynon), poet and musician, 66
- 19 October – Anne Ceridwen Rees, practising physician in the US, 31
- 23 October – William Phillips, botanist, 83
- 28 October – Barry Girling, Wales international rugby union player
- 10 November – Rowland Williams (Hwfa Môn), poet and archdruid, 82
- 19 November – Watkin Hezekiah Williams (Watcyn Wyn), schoolmaster and poet, 61
- 25 November – William Cadwaladr Davies, educationist, 56
- 8 December – Edward Davies, US-born minister, publisher of Y Cenhadwr, 78
- 9 December – Arthur Humphreys-Owen, barrister, landowner and politician, 69
- 14 December – Nathaniel Jones, minister and poet, 73
- 17 December – Robert Jones Derfel, poet and dramatist, 81

== See also ==
- 1905 in Ireland
