= 1904 in Wales =

- Centuries: 18th; 19th; 20th; 21st
- Decades: 1880s; 1890s; 1900s; 1910s; 1920s
- See also: List of years in Wales; Timeline of Welsh history 1904 in The United Kingdom Scotland Elsewhere

This article is about the particular significance of the year 1904 to Wales and its people.

== Incumbents ==
- Archdruid of the National Eisteddfod of Wales – Hwfa Môn
- Lord Lieutenant of Anglesey – Sir Richard Henry Williams-Bulkeley, 12th Baronet
- Lord Lieutenant of Brecknockshire – Joseph Bailey, 1st Baron Glanusk
- Lord Lieutenant of Caernarvonshire – John Ernest Greaves
- Lord Lieutenant of Cardiganshire – Herbert Davies-Evans
- Lord Lieutenant of Carmarthenshire – Sir James Williams-Drummond, 4th Baronet
- Lord Lieutenant of Denbighshire – William Cornwallis-West
- Lord Lieutenant of Flintshire – Hugh Robert Hughes
- Lord Lieutenant of Glamorgan – Robert Windsor-Clive, 1st Earl of Plymouth
- Lord Lieutenant of Merionethshire – W. R. M. Wynne
- Lord Lieutenant of Monmouthshire – Godfrey Morgan, 1st Viscount Tredegar
- Lord Lieutenant of Montgomeryshire – Sir Herbert Williams-Wynn, 7th Baronet
- Lord Lieutenant of Pembrokeshire – Frederick Campbell, 3rd Earl Cawdor
- Lord Lieutenant of Radnorshire – Powlett Milbank
- Bishop of Bangor – Watkin Williams
- Bishop of Llandaff – Richard Lewis
- Bishop of St Asaph – A. G. Edwards (later Archbishop of Wales)
- Bishop of St Davids – John Owen

== Events ==
- January - Opening of Llanelli North Dock.
- 5 January - Opening of Tanat Valley Light Railway between Llynclys and Llangynog.
- February - Beginning of the 1904–1905 Welsh revival in religion.
- 4 May - Charles Rolls and Henry Royce meet for the first time in Manchester to agree production of Rolls-Royce motor cars.
- 31 May - Wentwood Reservoir inaugurated for Newport Corporation.
- 26 May - Harvey du Cros junior makes the first successful ascent of Snowdon by automobile.
- 11 June - Henry Paget, 5th Marquess of Anglesey, is declared bankrupt; from 29 July sales of his assets at Plas Newydd (Anglesey) begin.
- 21 July - Edward VII and Queen Alexandra open the Elan Valley Reservoirs.
- 3 August - The first Royal Welsh Show is held at Aberystwyth.
- September - The second Pan-Celtic Congress is held at Caernarfon.
- 28–29 September - A conference at Blaenannerch reinforces the strength of the religious revival.
- October - Evan Roberts begins preaching.
- c. October - Mrs H. Millicent McKenzie is appointed Associated Professor of Education at the University College of South Wales and Monmouthshire in Cardiff, the first woman in Britain to hold a professorial title.
- 3 October - Five people are killed in a railway accident near Loughor.
- 31 October - Rhondda Tramways Company begins operation.
- November - Joseph Jenkins, instigator of the religious revival, is guest preacher at meetings in Bethany, Ammanford, and "converts" incumbent minister Nantlais Williams.
- In local authority elections, the Liberal Party win control of all county councils in Wales.
- Orthopaedic surgeon Robert Jones becomes Honorary Surgeon to the Baschurch Home in Shropshire which he will develop into the world's first specialized orthopaedic hospital.
- Thomas Marchant Williams is knighted in recognition of his role in founding the National Eisteddfod Society.
- No. 1 blast furnace at the old Blaenavon Ironworks is shut down.

== Arts and literature ==
- February - Gwen John arrives in Paris, in the company of Dorelia McNeill.

=== Awards ===
- National Eisteddfod of Wales - held in Rhyl
  - Chair - J. Machreth Rees, "Geraint ac Enid"
  - Crown - Richard Machno Humphreys

=== New books ===
==== English language ====
- Joseph Bradney - A History of Monmouthshire from the Coming of the Normans into Wales down to the Present Time, vol. 1

==== Welsh language ====
- Owen Dafydd (died c. 1814) - Cynhyrchion Barddonol yr Hen Felinydd Owen Dafydd Cwmaman
- Daniel Jenkins and David Lewis - Cerddi Cerngoch
- Eluned Morgan - Dringo'r Andes
- R. Silyn Roberts - Trystan ac Esyllt a Chaniadau Eraill

=== Music ===
- Sir Henry Walford Davies - Everyman (oratorio)

== Sport ==
- Rugby league - In the first international league match, played between England and Other nationalities, ex-Wales rugby international Jack Rhapps becomes the World's first dual-code rugby international.
- Rugby union - Percy Bush scores 104 points for the British team on their tour of Australia and New Zealand.

== Births ==
- 6 March - Hugh Williams, actor and dramatist (died 1969)
- 17 March - Daniel Granville West, Baron Granville-West, politician (died 1984)
- 12 April - David Jenkins, Wales national rugby footballer (died 1951)
- 18 May - Eynon Evans, actor and screenwriter (died 1989)
- 7 June - Tom Lewis, Wales international rugby player (died 1994)
- 8 June - Angus McBean, photographer (died 1990)
- 26 June
  - Prof Seaborne Davies, law teacher and three times President of the National Eisteddfod (died 1984)
  - Lynn Ungoed-Thomas, politician (died 1972)
- 27 June - Emrys Davies, cricketer (died 1975)
- 19 July - Richard Vaughan, novelist (died 1983)
- 28 July - Ned Jenkins, Wales international rugby player (died 1990)
- 31 July - Harold Davies, Baron Davies of Leek, politician (died 1985)
- 4 August – Sir Thomas Parry, academic (died 1985)
- 8 August - Dai Parker, Wales and British Lion rugby player (died 1965)
- 22 August - Tommy Rees, Wales dual-code rugby player (died 1968)
- 12 September
  - Euros Bowen, poet (died 1988)
  - Donald Holroyde Hey, chemist (died 1987)
- 24 September - George Andrews, Wales dual-code rugby player (died 1989)
- 27 September - John Gwilym Jones, dramatist (died 1988)
- 30 September - Waldo Williams, poet (died 1971)
- 10 October (in Somerset) – Leslie Morris, politician in Canada (died 1964)
- 15 October - Sir Julian Hodge, banker (died 2004)
- 3 November - Caradog Prichard, poet and novelist (died 1980)
- 30 November - Philip Burton, theatre director and radio producer (died 1995)

== Deaths ==
- 21 April - William Williams, businessman and politician, 64
- 10 May - Sir Henry Morton Stanley, journalist and explorer, 63
- 26 June - William Ormsby-Gore, 2nd Baron Harlech, 85
- 12 July – Samuel M. Jones, mayor of Toledo, Ohio, USA, 57
- 17 July - Isaac Roberts, astronomer, 75
- 25 July - James Valentine, English rugby international, 37 (struck by lightning while on holiday in Barmouth)
- September - Benjamin Davies, Welsh-descended Canadian politician, 91
- 4 October - James Lewis Thomas, architect, 78
- 21 November - Jimmy Michael, cyclist, 27 (alcohol-related)
- 24 November - Lewis Jones, one of the founders of the Welsh settlement in Patagonia, 68
- 26 December - William Henry Powell, American Civil War hero, 79
- 29 December - Edward Treharne, Wales international rugby player, 42 (heart attack)

== See also ==
- 1904 in Ireland
