= 1903 in Wales =

- Centuries: 18th; 19th; 20th; 21st
- Decades: 1880s; 1890s; 1900s; 1910s; 1920s
- See also: List of years in Wales; Timeline of Welsh history 1903 in The United Kingdom Scotland Elsewhere

This article is about the particular significance of the year 1903 to Wales and its people.

== Incumbents ==
- Archdruid of the National Eisteddfod of Wales – Hwfa Môn
- Lord Lieutenant of Anglesey – Sir Richard Henry Williams-Bulkeley, 12th Baronet
- Lord Lieutenant of Brecknockshire – Joseph Bailey, 1st Baron Glanusk
- Lord Lieutenant of Caernarvonshire – John Ernest Greaves
- Lord Lieutenant of Cardiganshire – Herbert Davies-Evans
- Lord Lieutenant of Carmarthenshire – Sir James Williams-Drummond, 4th Baronet
- Lord Lieutenant of Denbighshire – William Cornwallis-West
- Lord Lieutenant of Flintshire – Hugh Robert Hughes
- Lord Lieutenant of Glamorgan – Robert Windsor-Clive, 1st Earl of Plymouth
- Lord Lieutenant of Merionethshire – W. R. M. Wynne
- Lord Lieutenant of Monmouthshire – Godfrey Morgan, 1st Viscount Tredegar
- Lord Lieutenant of Montgomeryshire – Sir Herbert Williams-Wynn, 7th Baronet
- Lord Lieutenant of Pembrokeshire – Frederick Campbell, 3rd Earl Cawdor
- Lord Lieutenant of Radnorshire – Powlett Milbank
- Bishop of Bangor – Watkin Williams
- Bishop of Llandaff – Richard Lewis
- Bishop of St Asaph – A. G. Edwards (later Archbishop of Wales)
- Bishop of St Davids – John Owen

== Events ==
- 4 April - Operations begin on
  - Welshpool and Llanfair Light Railway.
  - Wrexham and District Electric Tramways.
- 14 November - End of the lock-out at Penrhyn Quarry near Bethesda (begun 1900), the longest major industrial dispute in British history.
- Sygun Copper Mine is abandoned.
- Closure of the life-boat station on Ynys Llanddwyn.

== Arts and literature ==
- Arthur Machen marries Dorothie Purefoy Hudleston.

=== Awards ===
- National Eisteddfod of Wales - held in Llanelli
  - Chair - John Thomas Job, "Y Celt"
  - Crown - John Evans Davies

=== Cinema ===
- July - William Haggar releases Desperate Poaching Affray, seen as an important influence on the chase genre of film.

=== New books ===
==== English language ====
- J. Romilly Allen - Celtic Art in Pagan and Christian Times
- Sabine Baring-Gould - A Book of North Wales
- Bertrand Russell - The Principles of Mathematics

==== Welsh language ====
- Jonathan Ceredig Davies - Awstralia Orllewinol
- D. M. Lewis - Cofiant y Diweddar Barchedig Evan Lewis, Brynberian, 1813-96
- Llyfe Mormon (translation of the Book of Mormon)

== Births ==
- 1 January – Horace Evans, royal physician (died 1963)
- 9 February – Gipsy Daniels, Welsh boxer
- 24 March – Gwilym R. Jones, poet and editor (died 1993)
- 14 April – Glyn Simon, Archbishop of Wales (1968–71; died 1972)
- 17 April – Thomas Rowland Hughes, novelist, poet and dramatist (died 1949)
- 1 May – Geraint Goodwin, writer (died 1941)
- 9 May – Tudor Watkins, Baron Watkins, politician (died 1983)
- 6 June – Ceri Richards, artist (died 1971)
- 22 June – Harry Phillips, Wales international rugby player (died 1978)
- 18 August – Dorothy Edwards, novelist (died 1934)
- 8 November – Ronald Lockley, ornithologist and naturalist (died 2000)
- 22 November – David Rees-Williams, 1st Baron Ogmore (died 1976)
- 2 December – Jim Sullivan, Wales and British Isles rugby league player (died 1977)
- 6 December
  - E. D. Jones, librarian of National Library of Wales (died 1987)
  - Will Paynter, miners’ leader (died 1984)

== Deaths ==
- 15 January – David Howell, Dean of St Davids, 71
- 30 January – William Jones, historian, 73
- 17 February – Joseph Parry, composer, 61
- 19 February - Samuel Arthur Brain, businessman and politician, 53
- 8 March – Morgan Thomas, surgeon, 78
- 12 April – Daniel Silvan Evans, writer and lexicographer, 85
- 18 May – Richard Mills the younger, composer and music teacher, 62/3
- 19 June – Herbert Vaughan, Archbishop of Westminster, 71
- 24 June – Richard Fothergill, coal-owner and politician, 80
- 15 August – John Pryce, clergyman and writer, Dean of Bangor, 73
- 13 October – Morgan B. Williams, Welsh-born United States politician, 72
- 18 September – Sir Llewellyn Turner, politician, 80
- 9 December – Eliezer Pugh, philanthropist, 87
- date unknown Sir Walter Morgan, judge, about 82

== See also ==
- 1903 in Ireland
