= 1906 in Wales =

- Centuries: 18th; 19th; 20th; 21st
- Decades: 1880s; 1890s; 1900s; 1910s; 1920s
- See also: List of years in Wales; Timeline of Welsh history 1906 in The United Kingdom Scotland Elsewhere

This article is about the particular significance of the year 1906 to Wales and its people.

== Incumbents ==
- Archdruid of the National Eisteddfod of Wales – Dyfed
- Lord Lieutenant of Anglesey – Sir Richard Henry Williams-Bulkeley, 12th Baronet
- Lord Lieutenant of Brecknockshire – Joseph Bailey, 2nd Baron Glanusk
- Lord Lieutenant of Caernarvonshire – John Ernest Greaves
- Lord Lieutenant of Cardiganshire – Herbert Davies-Evans
- Lord Lieutenant of Carmarthenshire – Sir James Williams-Drummond, 4th Baronet
- Lord Lieutenant of Denbighshire – William Cornwallis-West
- Lord Lieutenant of Flintshire – Hugh Robert Hughes
- Lord Lieutenant of Glamorgan – Robert Windsor-Clive, 1st Earl of Plymouth
- Lord Lieutenant of Merionethshire – W. R. M. Wynne
- Lord Lieutenant of Monmouthshire – Godfrey Morgan, 1st Viscount Tredegar
- Lord Lieutenant of Montgomeryshire – Sir Herbert Williams-Wynn, 7th Baronet
- Lord Lieutenant of Pembrokeshire – Frederick Campbell, 3rd Earl Cawdor
- Lord Lieutenant of Radnorshire – Powlett Milbank
- Bishop of Bangor – Watkin Williams
- Bishop of Llandaff – Joshua Pritchard Hughes
- Bishop of St Asaph – A. G. Edwards (later Archbishop of Wales)
- Bishop of St Davids – John Owen

== Events ==
- 13 February - In the United Kingdom general election:
  - For the first time ever, no Conservative MP is elected in Wales.
  - William Brace becomes Labour MP for South Glamorganshire.
  - David Davies becomes Liberal MP for Montgomeryshire.
  - Ivor Guest becomes Liberal MP for Cardiff District.
  - Alfred Mond becomes Liberal MP for Chester.
  - John David Rees becomes Liberal MP for Montgomery District.
  - Ivor Treowen becomes MP for South Monmouthshire.
  - John Williams becomes MP for Gower District.
- 5 June - At the Eifion by-election, brought about by the resignation of John Bryn Roberts, Liberal candidate Ellis Davies is elected unopposed.
- 27 June - One of the strongest earthquakes recorded in the UK strikes Swansea with a strength of 5.2 on the Richter Scale, damaging several buildings.
- August - Evan Roberts suffers a breakdown, signalling the end of the 1904-1905 Welsh Revival.
- 14 August - The East Denbighshire by-election, brought about by the resignation of Samuel Moss, is won by the Liberal candidate Edward Hemmerde.
- 30 August - Official opening of Fishguard Harbour.
- 12 September - Opening of Newport Transporter Bridge.
- October
  - The new City Hall, Cardiff, and Law Courts are opened in Cathays Park.
  - Opening of the first purpose-built sanatorium in Wales, at Allt-yr-yn, Newport.
  - A by-election is held in Mid Glamorganshire as a result of the appointment of its MP, Samuel Evans, as Recorder of Swansea; he is required to seek re-election and in the by-election he is returned unopposed.
- date unknown
  - David Brynmor Jones is knighted.
  - Hydro-electricity is generated for the first time in Wales, at Cwm Dyli in Gwynedd.
  - Anglican Benedictine monks arrive at Caldey Island to found a community.
  - The South Wales Miners' Federation affiliates to the Labour Party.

== Arts and literature ==
- Ernest Rhys becomes editor of Everyman's Library.

=== Awards ===
- National Eisteddfod of Wales - held in Caernarfon
  - Chair - John James Williams (J. J.), "Y Lloer"
  - Crown - Hugh Emyr Davies

=== New books ===
==== English language ====
- Arthur Machen – The House of Souls
- W. J. Parry – The Cry of the People
- Allen Raine – Queen of the Rushes
- Edward Thomas - The Heart of England

==== Welsh language ====
- Owen Morgan Edwards - Clych Adgof
- Sarah Winifred Parry – Sioned: darluniau o fywyd gwledig yng Nghymru (book publication)
- Eliseus Williams (Eifion Wyn) - Telynegion Maes a Mor

=== Music ===
- The Welsh Folk Song Society is co-founded by soprano Mary Davies.
- David Vaughan Thomas - The Knight's Burial

=== Theatre ===
- 10 December - The New Theatre, Cardiff, opens to the public, with a performance of Shakespeare's Twelfth Night.

== Sport ==
- Boxing
  - 23 May - Tom Thomas wins the British middleweight title.
- Rugby union
  - Wales finish second in the 1906 Home Nations Championship, beating England and Scotland, but losing to Ireland.
  - 1 December - Wales lose 11–0 to South Africa in the first encounter between the two countries.
- Tennis - For the first and only time, a Davis Cup final is played in Wales. The United States defeat Australia at Newport.

== Births ==
- 10 January - Tom Arthur, Wales international rugby player
- 16 January - Watcyn Thomas, rugby player (died 1977)
- 19 February - Grace Williams, composer (died 1977)
- 4 March - Tommy Jones-Davies, Wales international rugby player (died 1960)
- 15 March - Bill Everson, Wales international rugby player (died 1966)
- 4 April - John Roberts Wales international rugby player (died 1965)
- 24 April - Leslie Thomas, politician (died 1971)
- 25 June - Roger Livesey, actor (died 1976)
- 27 June - Vernon Watkins, poet (died 1967)
- 12 July - Archie Skym, international rugby union player
- 15 July - Herbert Edmund-Davies, Baron Edmund-Davies, judge (died 1992)
- 16 October - Maudie Edwards, actress (died 1991)
- 18 November - Nigel Birch, Baron Rhyl, politician (died 1981)
- 8 December - Richard Llewellyn, novelist (died 1983)

== Deaths ==
- 6 January
  - Joseph Bailey, 1st Baron Glanusk, retired Lord Lieutenant of Brecknockshire, 65
  - Emrys ap Iwan, writer, 54
- 25 March - Gwilym Williams, judge, 66
- 4 June - John William Evans, politician, 36
- 24 June - Henry Dennis, industrialist, 80
- 24 July - John Edwards (Meiriadog), poet, 93
- 27 August - James Charles, painter, 55
- 4 September - William Bowen Rowlands, politician
- 16 September - Robert Llugwy Owen, minister and writer, 69
- 22 September - Griffith Arthur Jones, Anglican priest, 78
- 21 October - Griffith Jones (Glan Menai), writer, 70
- 25 November - William W. Davies, Mormon leader, 73
- 29 November - Mary Dillwyn Welby, photographer, 90
- 30 November - Sir Edward James Reed, politician, 76
- 30 December - William Stadden, Wales international rugby player, 45 (suicide)

== See also ==
- 1906 in Ireland
