= 1898 in Wales =

- Centuries: 17th; 18th; 19th; 20th; 21st
- Decades: 1870s; 1880s; 1890s; 1900s; 1910s
- See also: List of years in Wales; Timeline of Welsh history 1898 in The United Kingdom Scotland Elsewhere

This article is about the particular significance of the year 1898 to Wales and its people.

== Incumbents ==
- Archdruid of the National Eisteddfod of Wales – Hwfa Môn
- Lord Lieutenant of Anglesey – Sir Richard Henry Williams-Bulkeley, 12th Baronet
- Lord Lieutenant of Brecknockshire – Joseph Bailey, 1st Baron Glanusk
- Lord Lieutenant of Caernarvonshire – John Ernest Greaves
- Lord Lieutenant of Cardiganshire – Herbert Davies-Evans
- Lord Lieutenant of Carmarthenshire – John Campbell, 2nd Earl Cawdor (until 29 March); Sir James Williams-Drummond, 4th Baronet (from 12 July)
- Lord Lieutenant of Denbighshire – William Cornwallis-West
- Lord Lieutenant of Flintshire – Hugh Robert Hughes
- Lord Lieutenant of Glamorgan – Robert Windsor-Clive, 1st Earl of Plymouth
- Lord Lieutenant of Merionethshire – W. R. M. Wynne
- Lord Lieutenant of Monmouthshire – Henry Somerset, 8th Duke of Beaufort
- Lord Lieutenant of Montgomeryshire – Sir Herbert Williams-Wynn, 7th Baronet
- Lord Lieutenant of Pembrokeshire – Frederick Campbell, 3rd Earl Cawdor
- Lord Lieutenant of Radnorshire – Powlett Milbank
- Bishop of Bangor – Daniel Lewis Lloyd
- Bishop of Llandaff – Richard Lewis
- Bishop of St Asaph – A. G. Edwards (later Archbishop of Wales)
- Bishop of St Davids – John Owen

== Events ==
- 22 January — Newspaper Llais Llafur ("Labour Voice") is launched in Ystalyfera, and will continue to be published (under various titles) until 1971.
- 1 April–1 September — Welsh coal strike fails to remove the sliding scale, linking wages to the price of coal.
- 28 March–15 August — Plynlimon and Hafan Tramway runs regular market day passenger services.
- 10 May — Mumbles Pier is opened and the Swansea and Mumbles Railway is extended to it.
- 2 August — The Llandudno Motor Touring Co begins running excursions with the first motor buses in Wales at Llandudno.
- 24 October — The South Wales Miners' Federation is founded.
- 6 December — The Abercynon to Merthyr Tydfil stretch of the Glamorganshire Canal is closed because of subsidence.
- date unknown
  - Peak year of slate production in Wales.
  - Opening of new docks at Barry and Port Talbot.
  - Opening of Lluest-wen Reservoir.
  - The last stained glass window to be designed by Edward Burne-Jones is installed at St Deiniol's Church, Hawarden, by Morris & Co.

== Arts and literature ==
=== Awards ===
National Eisteddfod of Wales — held at Blaenau Ffestiniog

- Chair — Robert Owen Hughes, "Awen"
- Crown — Richard Roberts, "Charles o'r Bala"

=== New books ===
==== Welsh language ====
- Beriah Gwynfe Evans — Dafydd Dafis
- Daniel James (Gwyrosydd) — Aeron Awen Gwyrosydd
- John Owen Jones (Ap Ffarmwr) — Cofiant Gladstone
- T. Gwynn Jones — Gwedi Brad a Gofid

=== Music ===
- none known

== Sport ==
- Football — The Welsh Cup is won by the "Druids" for the sixth time in its 20-year history
- Rugby union
  - Senghenydd RFC and Ynysybwl RFC are founded.
  - February — The Welsh Rugby Union is readmitted into the International Football Rugby Board after the events of The Gould Affair and Wales can again play international rugby.
  - 19 March — Wales defeat Ireland 11–3 in a game played at Thomond Park, Limerick

== Births ==
- 20 January – Tudor Owen, actor (died 1979)
- 10 February – Thomas Jones, Baron Maelor, politician (died 1984)
- 20 April – Cliff Williams, Wales international rugby union player (died 1930)
- 29 July – Dorothy Rees, politician (died 1987)
- 29 August – Sydney Hinam, Wales international rugby union player (died 1982)
- 24 September – Henry Arthur Evans, politician (died 1958)
- 6 October – William John Edwards, Cerdd Dant singer (died 1978)
- 25 December – Islwyn Evans, Wales international rugby player (died 1974)

== Deaths ==
- 29 March – John Campbell, 2nd Earl Cawdor, politician, 80
- 25 May – Theophilus Harris Davies, sugar magnate, 64
- 17 June – Sir Edward Burne-Jones, artist, 64
- 17 July – Arthur Guest, politician, 56
- 11 August – Owen Humphrey Davies (Eos Llechid), composer, 59
- 6 September – Robert Jones, VC recipient, 41 (suicide)
- 26 September – Joseph Jenkins, farmer and diarist ("The Welsh Swagman"), 80
- 28 September – Thomas Gee, publisher, 83
- 29 October – David Stephen Davies, preacher and colonial leader
- 31 October – William Gilbert Rees, surveyor and explorer, New Zealand settler, 71
- 2 December – Michael D. Jones, Tad y Wladfa, founder of the Welsh settlement in Patagonia, 76
- 17 December – William Norton, Wales international rugby player, 36
- date unknown – John Jones, astronomer, about 80

== See also ==
- 1898 in Ireland
