= 1899 in Wales =

- Centuries: 17th; 18th; 19th; 20th; 21st
- Decades: 1870s; 1880s; 1890s; 1900s; 1910s
- See also: List of years in Wales; Timeline of Welsh history 1899 in The United Kingdom Scotland Elsewhere

This article is about the particular significance of the year 1899 to Wales and its people.

== Incumbents ==
- Archdruid of the National Eisteddfod of Wales – Hwfa Môn
- Lord Lieutenant of Anglesey – Sir Richard Henry Williams-Bulkeley, 12th Baronet
- Lord Lieutenant of Brecknockshire – Joseph Bailey, 1st Baron Glanusk
- Lord Lieutenant of Caernarvonshire – John Ernest Greaves
- Lord Lieutenant of Cardiganshire – Herbert Davies-Evans
- Lord Lieutenant of Carmarthenshire – Sir James Williams-Drummond, 4th Baronet
- Lord Lieutenant of Denbighshire – William Cornwallis-West
- Lord Lieutenant of Flintshire – Hugh Robert Hughes
- Lord Lieutenant of Glamorgan – Robert Windsor-Clive, 1st Earl of Plymouth
- Lord Lieutenant of Merionethshire – W. R. M. Wynne
- Lord Lieutenant of Monmouthshire – Henry Somerset, 8th Duke of Beaufort (until 30 April); Godfrey Morgan, 1st Viscount Tredegar (from 23 June)
- Lord Lieutenant of Montgomeryshire – Sir Herbert Williams-Wynn, 7th Baronet
- Lord Lieutenant of Pembrokeshire – Frederick Campbell, 3rd Earl Cawdor
- Lord Lieutenant of Radnorshire – Powlett Milbank
- Bishop of Bangor – Watkin Williams (from 2 February)
- Bishop of Llandaff – Richard Lewis
- Bishop of St Asaph – A. G. Edwards (later Archbishop of Wales)
- Bishop of St Davids – John Owen

== Events ==
- 25 January – Adelina Patti marries her third husband, Baron Rolf Cederström, in a Roman Catholic service at Brecon.
- 20 March – W. H. Davies, "tramp-poet", loses his foot trying to jump a freight train at Renfrew, Ontario.
- 29 March – A French barque, Le Maréchal Lannes, is wrecked off Grassholm, with the loss of its crew of 25.
- April – The Duke and Duchess of York visit Gwydir Castle.
- 23 May – William Goscombe John's statue of "The Little Girl" at Llansannan is unveiled by Mrs Herbert Roberts.
- 20 July – A rabid dog attacks a group of children in Pontarddulais. In August, eight of them are sent to the Pasteur Institute in Paris to be inoculated.
- 18 August – Llest Colliery explosion at Pontyrhyl in Glamorganshire kills 19 coal miners.
- 2 September – Arthur Wade-Evans takes the surname "Wade-Evans" by deed poll.
- date unknown
  - Businessman Arthur Keen buys the Dowlais Iron Company from Ivor Bertie Guest, 1st Baron Wimborne.
  - The George Hotel, Chepstow, is rebuilt.
  - Explorer Henry Morton Stanley is knighted.
  - In the United States, J. Vyrnwy Morgan, pastor of the First Baptist Church at Omaha, Nebraska, relocates to Denver, Colorado, for the sake of his wife's health. (She dies on New Year's Day 1900.)

== Arts and literature ==
=== Awards ===
National Eisteddfod of Wales – held at Cardiff

- Chair – withheld
- Crown – R. Gwylfa Roberts, "Y Diddanydd Arall"

=== New books ===
==== English language ====
- Rhoda Broughton – Foes in Law
- Allen Raine – By Berwyn Banks
- William Retlaw Jefferson Williams – The Parliamentary History of Oxford, 1213-1899

==== Welsh language ====
- John Hughes – Ysgol Jacob
- Daniel Evan Jones – Hanes Plwyf Llangeler a Phenboyr
- John Owen Jones (Ap Ffarmwr) – Cofiant Gladstone
- James Morris – Cofiant Thomas Jones, Conwyl

=== Music ===
- 11 March – The Gramophone Company makes the first recording in the Welsh language, including Madge Breese singing Hen wlad fy nhadau.

=== Works ===
- Walford Davies – Overture, A Welshman in London

== Sport ==
- Football
  - The Welsh Cup is won by the "Druids" for the seventh time in its 21-year history.
  - Cardiff City F.C. is founded, under the name of "Riverside Reserves".
- Yachting – The River Towy Yacht Club is founded.

== Births ==
- 18 February – Mervyn Johns, actor (died 1992)
- 8 March – Eric Linklater, writer (died 1974)
- 30 March – Cyril Radcliffe, lawyer and public servant involved in the Partition of India (died 1977)
- 14 April – Arthur Owens, intelligence agent (died 1957)
- 28 April – Len Davies, footballer (died 1945)
- 17 May – H. H. Price, philosopher (died 1984)
- 18 May
  - Ronald Armstrong-Jones, barrister (died 1966)
  - David James Jones (Gwenallt), poet (died 1968)
- 16 June – Jack Gore, Wales international rugby player (died 1971)
- 15 July – Idris Cox, political activist (died 1989)
- 16 July – Ernie Finch, Wales international rugby player (died 1983)
- 12 December – Charlie Jones, footballer (died 1966)
- 20 December – Martyn Lloyd-Jones, preacher (died 1981)

== Deaths ==
- 9 January – Harry Congreve Evans, Australian journalist of Welsh descent, 38
- 4 February – William Hughes, Welsh-born US politician, 57
- 2 March – John Owen Jones (Ap Ffarmwr), journalist, 38
- 22 March – Tom Morgan, Wales international rugby player, 32
- 5 April
  - T. E. Ellis, politician, 40
  - Richard P. Howell, Welsh-born US carpenter, businessman, and politician, 67
- 16 April – William Roberts, physician, 69
- 19 May – Elias Owen, clergyman and antiquarian, 65
- 4 August – Daniel Lewis Lloyd, bishop and academic, 55
- 18 August – Nicholas Bennett, historian, 76
- 28 August – Owen Glynne Jones, mountaineer, 31
- 9 September – William Pamplin, English-born botanist, 93
- 13 October – Charles Ashton, literary historian, 51 (suicide)
- 18 November – Henry Hicks, geologist, 62
- 23 November – Dai St. John, heavyweight boxer, 28
- 11 December – Stephen W. Williams, civil engineer and architect, 62

== See also ==
- 1899 in Ireland
