= 1909 in Wales =

- Centuries: 18th; 19th; 20th; 21st
- Decades: 1880s; 1890s; 1900s; 1910s; 1920s
- See also: List of years in Wales; Timeline of Welsh history 1909 in The United Kingdom Scotland Elsewhere

This article is about the particular significance of the year 1909 to Wales and its people.

== Incumbents ==
- Archdruid of the National Eisteddfod of Wales – Dyfed
- Lord Lieutenant of Anglesey – Sir Richard Henry Williams-Bulkeley, 12th Baronet
- Lord Lieutenant of Brecknockshire – Joseph Bailey, 2nd Baron Glanusk
- Lord Lieutenant of Caernarvonshire – John Ernest Greaves
- Lord Lieutenant of Cardiganshire – Herbert Davies-Evans
- Lord Lieutenant of Carmarthenshire – Sir James Williams-Drummond, 4th Baronet
- Lord Lieutenant of Denbighshire – William Cornwallis-West
- Lord Lieutenant of Flintshire – Hugh Robert Hughes
- Lord Lieutenant of Glamorgan – Robert Windsor-Clive, 1st Earl of Plymouth
- Lord Lieutenant of Merionethshire – W. R. M. Wynne (until 25 February); Sir Osmond Williams, 1st Baronet (from 22 March)
- Lord Lieutenant of Monmouthshire – Godfrey Morgan, 1st Viscount Tredegar
- Lord Lieutenant of Montgomeryshire – Sir Herbert Williams-Wynn, 7th Baronet
- Lord Lieutenant of Pembrokeshire – Frederick Campbell, 3rd Earl Cawdor
- Lord Lieutenant of Radnorshire – Powlett Milbank
- Bishop of Bangor – Watkin Williams
- Bishop of Llandaff – Joshua Pritchard Hughes
- Bishop of St Asaph – A. G. Edwards (later Archbishop of Wales)
- Bishop of St Davids – John Owen

== Events ==
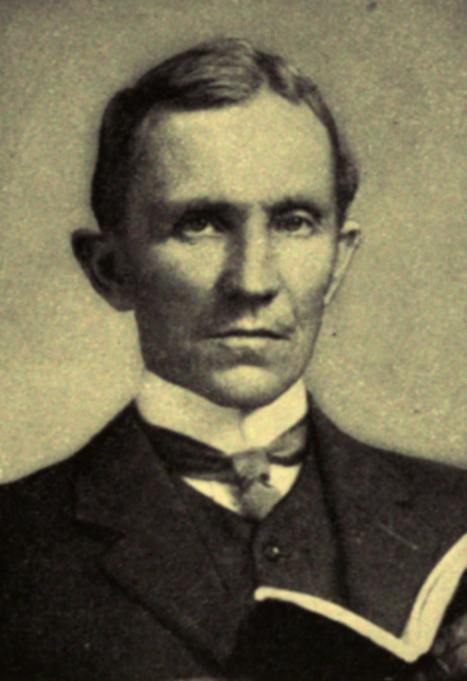
16 January: Edgeworth David

- January – Noah Ablett is a founding member of the Plebs' League at Ruskin College, Oxford.
- 1 January – John Ballinger becomes first librarian of the National Library of Wales which is being set up in Aberystwyth, initially in temporary premises in the former Assembly Rooms.
- 16 January – Edgeworth David is a member of the expedition which successfully reaches the Magnetic South Pole.
- 2 July – Thirty-six men are killed when a trench collapses during construction of the Alexandra Dock part of Newport Docks.
- 26 July–7 August - The National Pageant of Wales is held at Cardiff Castle.
- 30 August – RMS Mauretania (1906) calls at Fishguard.
- October – Monthly rainfall of 56.5 inches (1,440 mm) is measured at Llyn Llydaw, Snowdonia - a British record.
- 29 October – A mining accident at Darren Colliery, New Tredegar, kills 26 men.
- December – Thomas "Toya" Lewis is awarded the Albert Medal by Edward VII for his heroism in rescuing survivors of the Newport Dock collapse on 2 July.
- date unknown
  - King's Dock, part of Swansea Docks, is opened.
  - First coal raised from Penallta Colliery.
  - The first mines rescue station in south Wales is opened at Aberaman.
  - The Bryn Eglwys slate quarry, the Abergynolwyn estate and village and Talyllyn Railway are purchased by Henry Haydn Jones.
  - Thomas Rees becomes principal of Bala-Bangor Theological College.
  - Completion of Berw Bridge over the River Taff above Pontypridd, the longest reinforced concrete span in the U.K. at this date (116 feet (35 m)); it is designed by L. G. Mouchel to Hennebique patents and built by Watkin Williams and Page.
  - Clark's Pies originates in Cardiff.

== Arts and literature ==
=== Awards ===
- National Eisteddfod of Wales – held in London
  - Chair – T. Gwynn Jones, "Gwlad y Bryniau"
  - Crown – W. J. Gruffydd, "Yr Arglwydd Rhys"

=== New books ===
==== English language ====
- John Gwenogvryn Evans (ed.) – Facsimile of the Chirk Codex
- Edward Thomas – The South Country
- Arthur Wade-Evans – Welsh Mediaeval Law

==== Welsh language ====
- Emrys ap Iwan – Homilïau vol. 2 (posthumous)
- Hugh Brython Hughes – Tair Cwpan Aur

=== Music ===
- Evan Thomas Davies – Ynys y Plant

== Sport ==
- Boxing

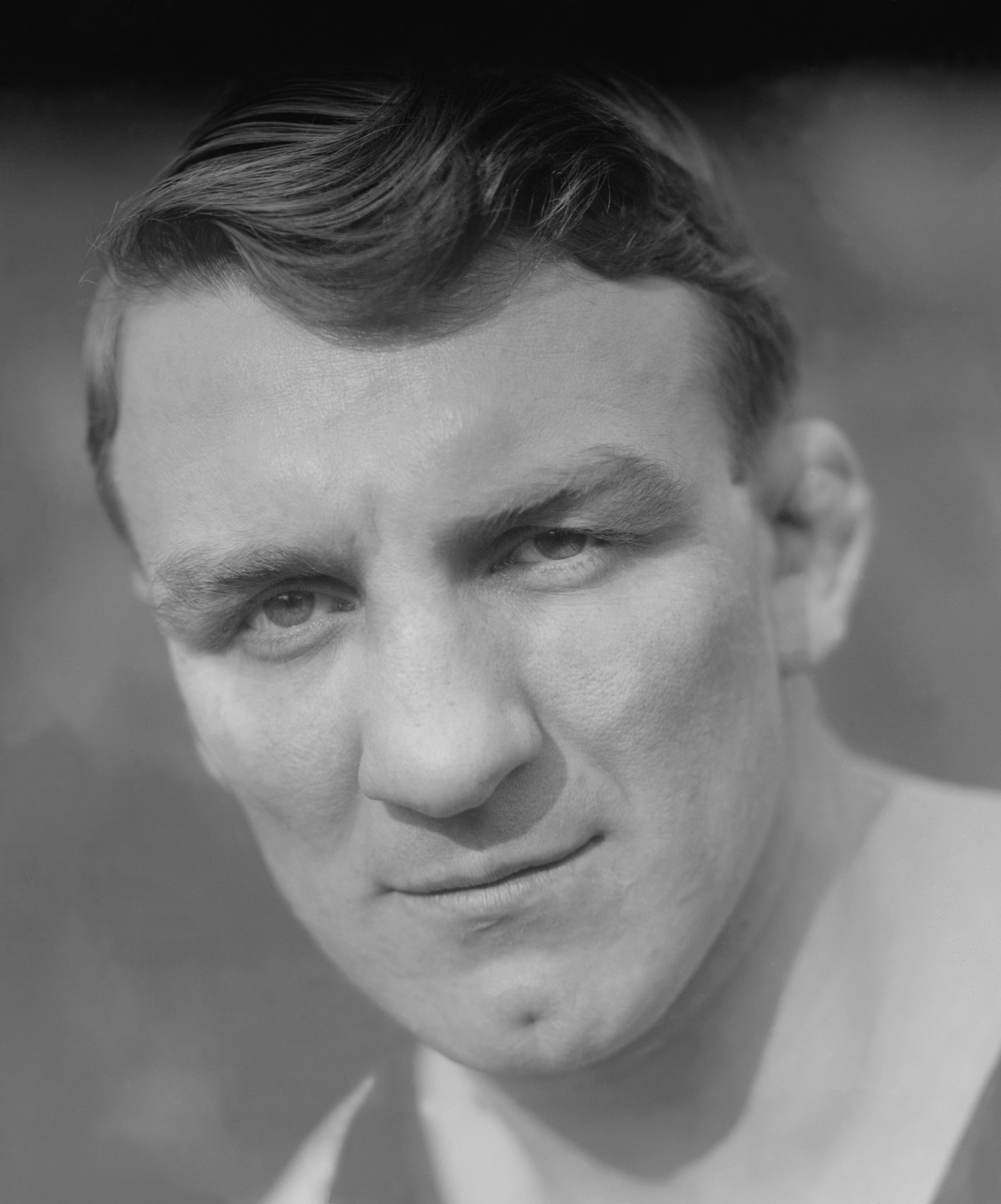
Freddie Welsh

  - 23 August – Freddie Welsh wins the European lightweight title (at Mountain Ash).
  - 8 November – Freddie Welsh wins the British lightweight title, and becomes the first boxer to be awarded a Lonsdale Belt (in London).
  - 20 December – Thomas Thomas is awarded the first Lonsdale Belt at middleweight.
- Sport of athletics
  - 23 August – Welshman Fred 'Tenby' Davies beats Irishman Bert Day to become world champion over the half-mile distance (at Pontypridd).
- Rugby league
  - Aberdare RLFC, Barry RLFC and Mid-Rhondda RLFC fold after just one season. The first Welsh League competition is won by Ebbw Vale.
- Rugby union
  - Wales win their second Grand Slam.

== Births ==
- 4 January – Glyndwr Michael, vagrant whose body was used as Maj. William Martin, RM, in Operation Mincemeat (died 1943)
- 29 January – George Thomas, 1st Viscount Tonypandy (died 1997)
- 14 February – Harry Peacock, Wales rugby union player (died 1996)
- 20 February – Bill Roberts, Wales international rugby union player (died 1969)
- 5 March – Howard Thomas, radio and television producer (died 1986)
- 10 March – Glen Moody, boxer (died 1989)
- 30 March – Dai Thomas, Wales national rugby player (date of death unknown)
- 1 April – George Ewart Evans, folklorist and oral historian (died 1988)
- 11 May – Aneirin Talfan Davies, writer and publisher (died 1980)
- 11 June – Ronnie Boon, Wales rugby union player (died 1998)
- 12 June – Mansel Thomas, composer and conductor (died 1986)
- 16 July – Eddie Jenkins footballer (died 2005)
- 28 July – Jack Morley, Wales and British Lions rugby player (died 1972)
- 25 August – Arwel Hughes, composer (died 1988)
- 30 September – Arthur Probert, politician (died 1975)
- 1 October – Jim Lang, Wales rugby union player (died 1991)
- 24 October – Elwyn Jones, Baron Elwyn-Jones, politician (died 1989)
- 25 October – Walter Vickery, Wales national rugby player (died 2000)
- 7 November – Eirene White, politician (died 1999)
- 29 November – Goronwy Rees, journalist and academic (died 1979)
- 14 December – Ronald Welch, historical novelist (died 1982)
- date unknown
  - Isaac Davies (Eic Davies), dramatist (died 1993)
  - Evan Roberts, botanist (died 1991)

== Deaths ==
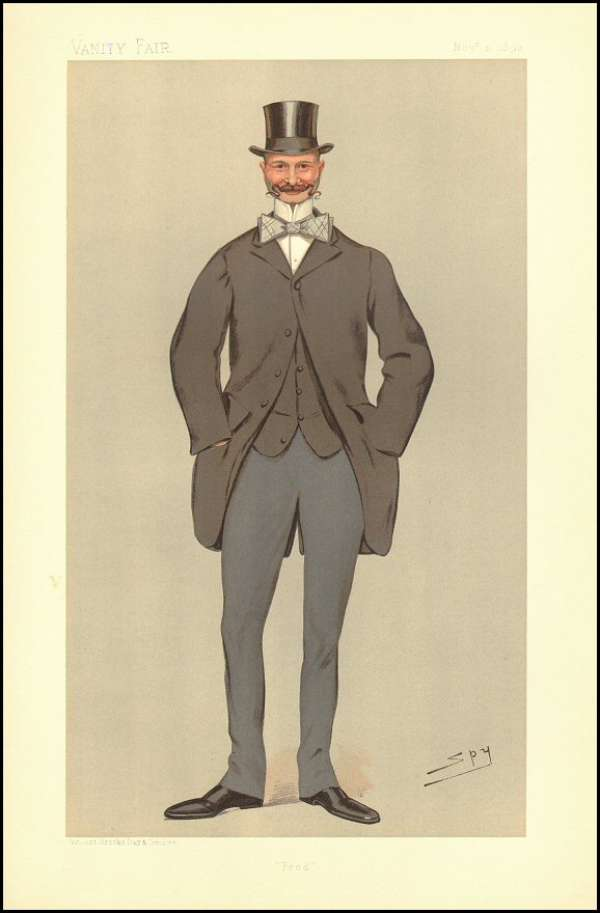
January:Frederick Courtenay Morgan

- 3 January – Robert Bird, politician, 69
- 8 January – Frederick Courtenay Morgan, politician, 74
- 9 January – Erasmus Jones, Welsh-American minister and author, 91
- 5 February – W. R. M. Wynne, politician, landowner, collector of manuscripts, Lord Lieutenant of Merionethshire, 68
- 9 March – David Thomas (Dewi Hefin), poet, 80
- 29 March – Catherine Prichard, poet, 66
- April – Ivor James, educationist
- 19 April – J. S. Pughe, Welsh-born American political cartoonist, 39
- 31 May – Thomas Price, Premier of South Australia, 57
- 9 June – Walter Rice Evans, Wales international rugby player
- 2 July – Sir Arthur Cowell-Stepney, landowner and politician, 74
- 1 August – General Sir Hugh Rowlands, VC recipient, 81
- 23 September – Thomas Edward Lloyd, politician, 89
- 17 October – Edward David Williams, politician in Australia, 67
- 22 October – David Rogers, politician in Canada, 79
- 9 November – Montague Guest, politician, son of Lady Charlotte Guest, 70
- 10 November – George Essex Evans, Welsh-Australian poet, 46 (complications arising from gall bladder surgery)
- 11 December – Ludwig Mond, industrialist, 70
- 13 December – Sir Alfred Lewis Jones, shipping magnate, 64

== See also ==
- 1909 in Ireland
