= 1894 in Wales =

- Centuries: 17th; 18th; 19th; 20th; 21st
- Decades: 1870s; 1880s; 1890s; 1900s; 1910s
- See also: List of years in Wales; Timeline of Welsh history 1894 in The United Kingdom Scotland Elsewhere

This article is about the particular significance of the year 1894 to Wales and its people.

== Incumbents ==
- Archdruid of the National Eisteddfod of Wales – Clwydfardd (until 30 October)
- Lord Lieutenant of Anglesey – Richard Davies
- Lord Lieutenant of Brecknockshire – Joseph Bailey, 1st Baron Glanusk
- Lord Lieutenant of Caernarvonshire – John Ernest Greaves
- Lord Lieutenant of Cardiganshire – Herbert Davies-Evans
- Lord Lieutenant of Carmarthenshire – John Campbell, 2nd Earl Cawdor
- Lord Lieutenant of Denbighshire – William Cornwallis-West
- Lord Lieutenant of Flintshire – Hugh Robert Hughes
- Lord Lieutenant of Glamorgan – Robert Windsor-Clive, 1st Earl of Plymouth
- Lord Lieutenant of Merionethshire – W. R. M. Wynne
- Lord Lieutenant of Monmouthshire – Henry Somerset, 8th Duke of Beaufort
- Lord Lieutenant of Montgomeryshire – Sir Herbert Williams-Wynn, 7th Baronet
- Lord Lieutenant of Pembrokeshire – William Edwardes, 4th Baron Kensington
- Lord Lieutenant of Radnorshire – Arthur Walsh, 2nd Baron Ormathwaite
- Bishop of Bangor – Daniel Lewis Lloyd
- Bishop of Llandaff – Richard Lewis
- Bishop of St Asaph – Alfred George Edwards
- Bishop of St Davids – Basil Jones

== Events ==
- 19 February – The first new intermediate school in Wales opens at Caernarfon. Ysgol Syr Hugh Owen is one of the first Welsh medium schools.
- 10 March – T. E. Ellis is appointed Parliamentary Secretary to the Treasury in the Gladstone's fourth ministry, and becomes Chief Whip of the Liberal Party.
- March/April – In the "Welsh Revolt", MPs Herbert Lewis, David Alfred Thomas, David Lloyd George and Frank Edwards resign the Liberal whip.
- 23 June – A firedamp explosion at Albion Colliery, Cilfynydd, Glamorgan, results in the death of 290 coal miners and 123 horses underground, making it the worst disaster in Welsh mining history to date (it will be exceeded only by that at Senghenydd in 1913).
- August
  - The Prince of Wales attends the National Eisteddfod.
  - Owen Morgan Edwards makes his first report on county schools in Wales
- unknown dates
- Dissolution of the North Wales Scholarship Association.
- John Philipps, later 1st Viscount St Davids, resigns as MP for Mid Lanarkshire.
- Richard Mills the younger establishes the Rhos Herald, a weekly bilingual newspaper, with himself as editor.

== Arts and literature ==
=== Awards ===
National Eisteddfod of Wales – held at Caernarfon

- Chair – Howell Elvet Lewis, "Hunanaberth"
- Crown – Ben Davies, "Tennyson"

=== New books ===
==== English language ====
- Sir John Rhys – Outlines of the Phonology of the Manx Gaelic

==== Welsh language ====
- Evan Thomas Davies (Dyfrig) – Pregethau ac Anerchiadau
- W. J. Davis – Hanes Plwyf Llandysul, first publication by Gomer Press, Llandysul
- Owen Morgan Edwards – Ystraeon o Hanes Cymru
- Daniel Owen – Gwen Tomos
- Sarah Winifred Parry – Sioned (serialization begins)

=== Music ===
- Sir Henry Walford Davies – Sonata No. 1 in E minor, for Piano and Violin
- Spillers Records is founded in Cardiff; by 2010 it will be regarded the world's oldest surviving record shop.

== Sport ==
- Cricket
  - 22 June / 23 June – Glamorgan play against the touring South Africans. The Glamorgan team contains three Wales rugby internationals, Billy Bancroft, Selwyn Biggs and Ralph Sweet-Escott.
  - William Brain plays his first match for Glamorgan.
- Football
  - The Welsh Cup is won by Chirk for the fifth time in its 15-year history.
  - The North Wales Coast League is established.
- Rugby union
  - 1 January – Gwyn Nicholls plays his first match for Cardiff.
  - Abercrave RFC, Llanhilleth RFC and Ynysddu RFC are founded.

== Births ==
- 14 March – Ben Beynon, Welsh rugby union international and Swansea Town player (died 1969)
- 21 March – William Hubert Vaughan, public servant (died 1959)
- 16 May – Sir Leonard Twiston Davies, patron of the arts (died 1953)
- 23 June – Prince Edward (later Prince of Wales, Edward VIII then Duke of Windsor; died 1972)
- 4 July – Ambrose Bebb, author and politician (died 1955)
- 10 July – Emrys Hughes, politician (died 1969)
- 31 July – Fred Keenor, footballer (died 1972)
- 23 August – Gareth Hughes, actor (died 1965)
- 27 August – Ike Fowler, dual-code international rugby union player (died 1981)
- 22 October – Llew Edwards, featherweight boxer (died 1965)
- 30 October – Peter Warlock, composer (died 1930)

== Deaths ==
- 24 February – John Roberts, politician, 58
- 8 March – John Bickerton Morgan, geologist, 34
- 20 March – John Davies (Taliesin Hiraethog), poet, 52
- 18 June – David Davies, Australian politician, about 54
- 30 October – David Griffith (Clwydfardd), poet, 93
- 4 November – Idris Williams, 59
- 28 November – Henry Hussey Vivian, 1st Baron Swansea, 73
- 13 December – Morgan Morgan, politician, 61
- 25 December – Arthur Hill-Trevor, 1st Baron Trevor, 75
- 30 December – David Thomas, preacher and publisher, 81

== See also ==
- 1894 in Ireland
