= 1893 in Wales =

- Centuries: 17th; 18th; 19th; 20th; 21st
- Decades: 1870s; 1880s; 1890s; 1900s; 1910s
- See also: List of years in Wales; Timeline of Welsh history 1893 in The United Kingdom Scotland Elsewhere

This article is about the particular significance of the year 1893 to Wales and its people.

== Incumbents ==
- Archdruid of the National Eisteddfod of Wales – Clwydfardd
- Lord Lieutenant of Anglesey – Richard Davies
- Lord Lieutenant of Brecknockshire – Joseph Bailey, 1st Baron Glanusk
- Lord Lieutenant of Caernarvonshire – John Ernest Greaves
- Lord Lieutenant of Cardiganshire – Herbert Davies-Evans
- Lord Lieutenant of Carmarthenshire – John Campbell, 2nd Earl Cawdor
- Lord Lieutenant of Denbighshire – William Cornwallis-West
- Lord Lieutenant of Flintshire – Hugh Robert Hughes
- Lord Lieutenant of Glamorgan – Robert Windsor-Clive, 1st Earl of Plymouth
- Lord Lieutenant of Merionethshire – W. R. M. Wynne
- Lord Lieutenant of Monmouthshire – Henry Somerset, 8th Duke of Beaufort
- Lord Lieutenant of Montgomeryshire – Sir Herbert Williams-Wynn, 7th Baronet
- Lord Lieutenant of Pembrokeshire – William Edwardes, 4th Baron Kensington
- Lord Lieutenant of Radnorshire – Arthur Walsh, 2nd Baron Ormathwaite
- Bishop of Bangor – Daniel Lewis Lloyd
- Bishop of Llandaff – Richard Lewis
- Bishop of St Asaph – Alfred George Edwards
- Bishop of St Davids – Basil Jones

== Events ==
- 13 February – The South Wales Daily Post is launched in Swansea.
- 11 April – In an underground fire at Great Western Mine, Pontypridd, 63 miners are killed.
- 6 June – Alexandra (Newport and South Wales) Docks and Railway opens South Dock in Newport Docks.
- 6 July – The future Prince of Wales, Prince George (later George V), marries Mary of Teck; their wedding rings are made of Welsh gold.
- 7 August – 24 people are drowned at Aberavon when a boat carrying trippers on a Sunday school outing from Ystrad Rhondda capsizes in the bay. A survivor claimed that the inexperienced passengers had been frightened by the waves and all ran to one side of the boat.
- September – An International Eisteddfod takes place in Chicago, USA, during the Chicago World's Fair.
- 17 November – Two boatmen involved in the Aberavon drowning disaster of 7 August are found not guilty of manslaughter by a jury at Cardiff Crown Court.

== Arts and literature ==
=== Awards ===
National Eisteddfod of Wales – held at Pontypridd

- Chair – John Ceulanydd Williams, "Pulpud Cymru"
- Crown – Ben Davies

=== New books ===
- Charles Ashton – Hanes Llenyddiaeth Gymreig o 1651 hyd 1850
- John Gruffydd Moelwyn Hughes – Caniadau Moelwyn
- Edwin Cynrig Roberts – Hanes Dechreuad y Wladfa Gymreig
- Eleazar Roberts – Owen Rees

=== Music ===
- Hymnau yr Eglwys (collection of hymns)

== Sport ==
- Football – The Welsh Cup is won by Wrexham for the third time in its 14-year history.
- Rugby union – Wales wins the Triple Crown for the first time.
- Rugby union – Glamorgan Wanderers, Laugharne RFC and Tredegar RFC are established.

== Births ==
- 15 January – Ivor Novello, composer and actor (died 1951)
- 27 January – John Russell, VC recipient (died 1917)
- 25 February
  - Billy Jennings, footballer (died 1968)
  - Gordon Lang, politician (died 1981)
- 23 May – Tudor Thomas, pioneering ophthalmic surgeon (died 1976)
- 24 May – William Hubert Davies, musician (died 1965)
- 1 June – Lewis Valentine, political activist (died 1986)
- 2 June – David James Davies, economist, industrialist and writer (died 1956)
- 1 July – Douglas Marsden-Jones, rugby player (died 1955)
- 2 July – Ralph Hancock, garden architect (died 1950)
- 13 July – Evan Morgan, 2nd Viscount Tredegar, poet, occultist and horticulturalist (died 1949)
- 1 August – Lionel Beaumont Thomas, MC, businessman and politician (died 1942)
- 15 October – Saunders Lewis, Welsh nationalist poet, dramatist and critic (died 1985)
- 18 October – Ivor Rees, VC recipient (died 1967)
- 29 December – Cyril Lakin, politician (died 1948)
- 31 December – Ossie Male, rugby player (died 1975)
- date unknown – Eleanor Evans, actress, singer and theatre director (died 1969)

== Deaths ==
- 14 January – John Hawley Edwards, footballer, 42
- 23 January – Dr William Price, eccentric, 92
- 28 January – David Owen, politician in Wisconsin, 64
- 29 January – Griffith Edwards (Gutyn Padarn), poet and antiquary, 80
- 12 February – Thomas Eyton-Jones, surgeon, physician, magistrate, local politician and army officer, 60
- 27 March – John Roberts, Sr., billiards champion, 69
- 30 March – Richard Crawley, writer, 52
- 24 August – Willie Llewelyn, cricketer, 25 (suicide)
- 5 September – Morgan Lloyd, politician, 71
- 17 September – Edwin Cynrig Roberts, Patagonian colonist, about 55
- 1 October – Samuel Griffith, Pennsylvania politician, 77
- 23 December – Sir George Elliot, 1st Baronet, MP and founder of the Elliot Home for Seamen in Newport 79

== See also ==
- 1893 in Ireland
