= Rodney David =

Welsh cricketer

Rodney David (19 June 1907 — 2 July 1969) was a Welsh cricketer. He was a right-handed batsman who played for Glamorgan. He was born in Cardiff and died in Hellingly.

David, who played his club cricket for Margam, made his first-class debut against a team captained and assembled by HDG Leveson-Gower, against whom he scored 17 runs in the only innings in which he batted.

David would not make another first-class appearance for four seasons, when he played against Cambridge University. David's only County Championship game came later in the same week against Northamptonshire, against whom he scored a duck in the first innings in which he batted and a single run in the second.
