= Griffith Arthur Jones =

British priest (1827–1906)

Griffith Arthur Jones (1827 – 22 September 1906) was a Welsh Anglican priest for over 50 years, and was a strong supporter of the practices of the Oxford Movement in his ministry.

== Life ==
Jones was born in Ruabon, Wales, where his father was curate. He studied at Jesus College, Oxford between 1847 and 1851, obtaining a Bachelor of Arts degree in 1851. He was also ordained deacon in 1851 (priest in 1852) and was initially curate in Trewalchmai and Heneglwys, Anglesey declining the vicarage of Llangorwen, Cardiganshire. He served as vicar of Llanegryn from 1857 to 1872, when he took up what was to be his last appointment, at St Mary's Church in Cardiff. He retired in 1903 and died on 22 September 1906. During his ministry in Wales, he followed and taught the views and practices of the Oxford Movement, having been greatly influenced by this when a student.
