= Catherine Prichard =

Welsh poet and suffragette

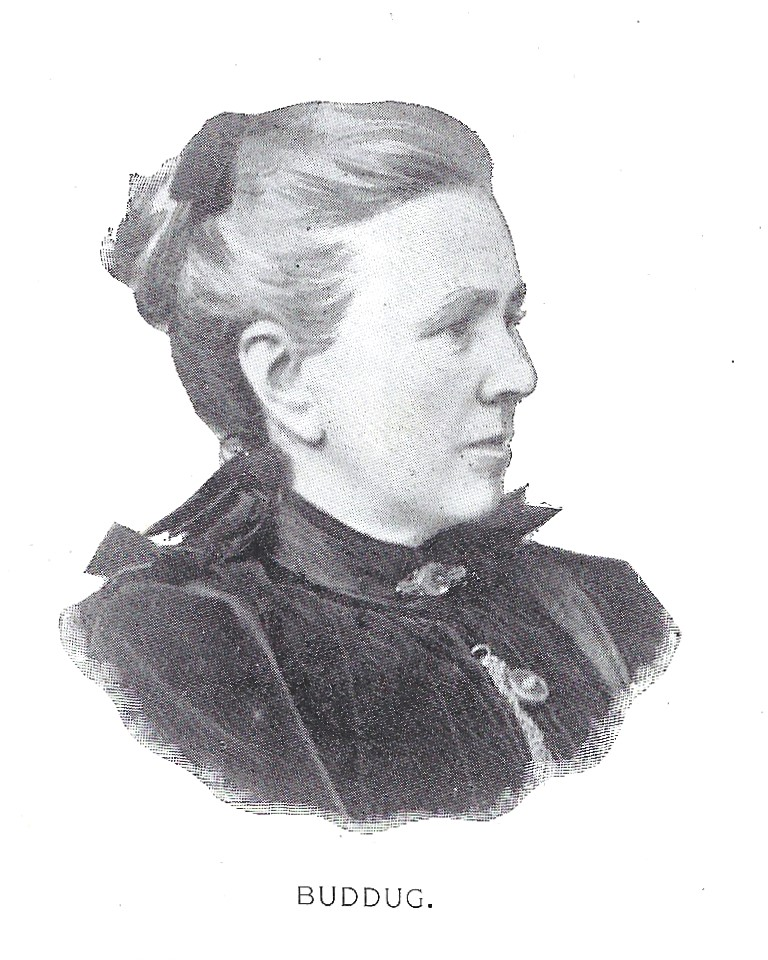

Catherine Jane Prichard (4 July 1842 – 29 March 1909), was a Welsh poet and suffragette who was also known by her pen name Buddug. She was the sister of the poet John Robert Pryse. She contributed extensively to the magazine Udgorn Cymru, and advocated for the temperance movement in Wales.
