= David Evans (Lord Mayor) =

Welsh politician (1849–1907)

Sir David Treharne Evans (21 April 1849 – August 1907) was a Welsh businessman and politician who served as Lord Mayor of London in 1891.

Evans was born at Llantrisant, Glamorganshire to Thomas and Anne Evans. He was senior sheriff of London and Middlesex in 1885-6.

On 30 July, 1892, he was made a Knight Commander of the Most Distinguished Order of St Michael and St George under Queen Victoria.
