= Dick Duckfield =

Welsh cricketer

Personal information
- Full name: Richard George Duckfield
- Born: 2 July 1907; Maesteg, Glamorgan, Wales
- Died: 30 December 1959 (aged 52); Bridgend, Glamorgan, Wales
- Batting: Right-handed
- Bowling: Right-arm medium
- Role: Batsman

Domestic team information
- Years: Team
- 1930–1938: Glamorgan

Career statistics
| Competition | First-class |
|---|---|
| Matches | 192 |
| Runs scored | 7000 |
| Batting average | 26.61 |
| 100s/50s | 10/37 |
| Top score | 280* |
| Balls bowled | 318 |
| Wickets | 0 |
| Bowling average | – |
| 5 wickets in innings | – |
| 10 wickets in match | – |
| Best bowling | – |
| Catches/stumpings | 27/– |
- Source: CricInfo, 12 June 2013

Richard George Duckfield (2 July 1907 – 30 December 1959) was a Welsh cricketer who played first-class cricket for Glamorgan between 1930 and 1938 as a right-hand bat. Largely successful between 1932 and 1938, Duckfield held the record for the highest score by a Glamorgan player for a time – 280 against Surrey. He retired from the game in 1938 after a loss of confidence in his own fielding, having scored exactly 7,000 runs.

== Career ==
Born in Maesteg, then part of Glamorgan but now lying within Bridgend County Borough, Duckfield began as a player for various local invitational XIs as well as for Maesteg Town cricket club in 1925, and Glamorgan Club and Ground from 1926. From 1930 he began to feature for Glamorgan in the County Championship, and by 1932 he had established himself with Glamorgan and scored 1,000 runs over one season for the first time, as well as his first century against Middlesex. He would go on to score 7,000 runs for them and for the invitational 'Players' Eleven – his century during a Gentlemen v Players match drew many plaudits from Wisden in 1934. His career-high score of 280 not out, made against Surrey in 1936, was for a time the record high score for Glamorgan. However, by 1938 a loss of confidence in the field led to his retirement from the game. Glamorgan historian Dr. A. K. Hignell noted that "he started to doubt his ability in the field and found it increasingly difficult to either catch a ball in the air or field a ball running along the ground. As this preyed on his mind, Duckfield lost his place in the county's side."
