= Sydney Hinam =

Wales international rugby union & league footballer

Syd Hinam
Personal information
- Full name: Sydney Hinam
- Born: 29 August 1898; Pontypool, Wales
- Died: 16 August 1982 (aged 83); Cardiff, Wales

Playing information

Rugby union
- Position: Flanker
Club
Years	Team	Pld	T	G	FG	P
1922–26	Cardiff RFC	96
	Glamorgan Police RFC
	Total	96	0	0	0	0
Representative
Years	Team	Pld	T	G	FG	P
1925–26	Wales	5	0	0	0	0

Rugby league
- Position: Prop
Club
Years	Team	Pld	T	G	FG	P
1926	Rochdale Hornets
Representative
Years	Team	Pld	T	G	FG	P
1927	Glamorgan	≥1

Sydney Hinam (29 August 1898 – 16 August 1982) was a Welsh rugby union and professional rugby league footballer who played in the 1920s. He played representative level rugby union (RU) for Wales, and at club level for Cardiff RFC and Glamorgan Police RFC, as a flanker, and representative level rugby league (RL) for Glamorgan, and at club level for Rochdale Hornets, as a prop.

== Background ==
Sydney Hinam was born in Pontypool, Wales, and he died aged 83 in Cardiff, Wales.

== Playing career ==
=== International honours ===
Sydney Hinam won caps for Wales (RU) while at Cardiff RFC in 1925 against Ireland, and England, and in 1926 against Scotland, Ireland, and France.

=== County honours ===
Sydney Hinam played at prop in Glamorgan's 18-14 victory over Monmouthshire in the non-County Championship match during the 1926–27 season at Taff Vale Park, Pontypridd on Saturday 30 April 1927.
