= Eliseus Williams =

Eifion Wyn
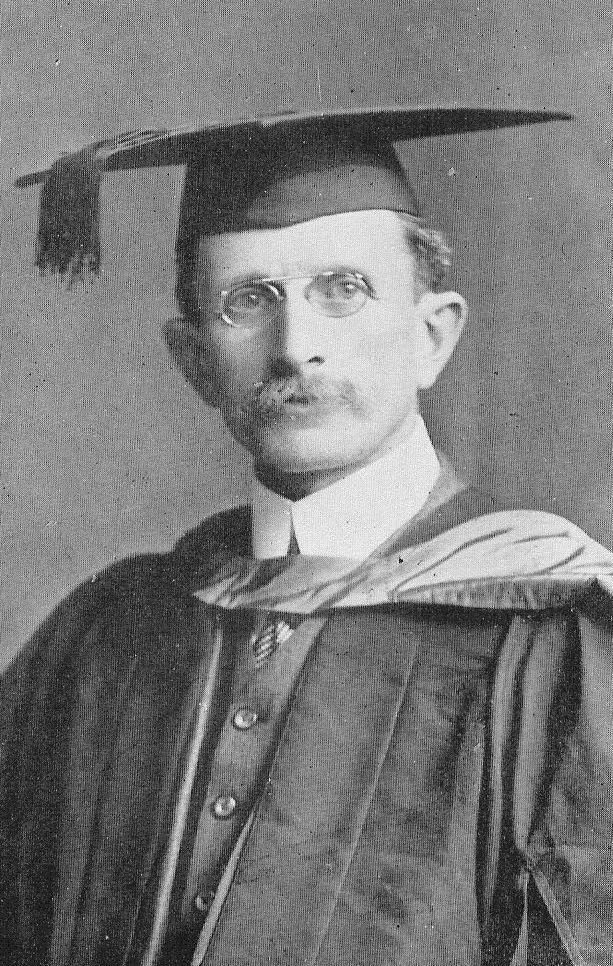
- Born: Eliseus Williams; 2 May 1867; Porthmadog, Caernarfonshire
- Died: 13 October 1926 (aged 59)
- Occupation: poet

Eliseus Williams (2 May 1867 – 13 October 1926), better known by his bardic name "Eifion Wyn", was a Welsh language poet, born at Porthmadog in Caernarfonshire, Wales. The primary school in the town of Porthmadog where he lived is named after him.

His best known volumes are Telynegion Maes a Môr (1906) and Caniadau'r Allt (1927), the latter of which was published posthumously.
