= Philip Ellis (priest) =

Philip Constable Ellis (1822 – 10 May 1900) was a Welsh Anglican priest in the Anglo-Catholic tradition and one of the earliest Tractarians in north Wales.

Ellis studied at Beaumaris Grammar School and Jesus College, Oxford, where he matriculated at the age of 18 in 1840. He graduated in 1843 or 1844, coming under the influence of the Tractarian movement whilst at Oxford. He did much to promote Anglo-Catholicism after his ordination in 1846, refusing to deal with non-conformists, holding daily services and making changes to church ritual and furnishings. He was the curate of Charles Williams at Holyhead in 1847 and in 1850 became perpetual curate of Llanfaes and Penmon, all on the island of Anglesey in north Wales. His final position was as rector of Llanfairfechan, Gwynedd, from 1862 until his death in 1900. He refused three offers to become a Dean of a cathedral in Wales. His refusals to compromise his Anglo-Catholic principles led to conflict with Christopher Bethell, the Bishop of Bangor (despite Bethell's own views), but Ellis had influential support within the diocese and Bethell did not pursue his attempts to discipline Ellis.
