= Morgan Thomas =

Welsh-Australian surgeon and public benefactor (1824–1903)

Morgan Thomas (15 December 1824 – 7 March 1903) was a Welsh-Australian surgeon and public benefactor.

Thomas was born in Glynneath, Glamorganshire, Wales on 15 December 1824. He earned his medical degree in England in 1847. He moved to Adelaide in 1851, opened a practice in 1852 and served throughout the 1860s as a Colonial Surgeon. He practised surgery, both as a private individual and for the government, in Nairne and Adelaide. He was one of the leading doctors at the Adelaide Hospital.

After retiring in 1870 Thomas lived out the remainder of his life in Adelaide. He was a reclusive man and was obscure at the time of his death.

He was a regular visitor to the Adelaide Library and often expressed his admiration for libraries, as he thought they were important for education. He purchased property in Adelaide and invested in local companies, banks and British Consols; at the time of his death his investments were collectively worth at least £16,000. He died, in his sleep, at his home in Adelaide on 7 March 1903; he was 78 years old. He had outlived his wife; they had never had children. His body was interred in the North Road Cemetery and a monument installed above it.

In his will he had bequeathed £65,679 in total to the Adelaide Library, Museum and Art Gallery. It was reported that the library was in great need, and highly appreciative, of Thomas's money, as the government had cut its funding by £1,000. Thomas's bequest had been the first made to all of those institutions simultaneously. However, The Areas' Express criticised Thomas for willing his money to a library and museum, which it claimed were already wealthy, instead of to charity.

In 1906 three tablets, made of wood and copper, were designed by H. P. Gill, the director of the School of Design and Technical Art, to honour Thomas. They were installed in the library, the museum and the art gallery. Each tablet had a leek, an oak and a Welsh Dragon engraved onto it to represent Thomas's Welsh origin.
