= Myrddin Fardd =

Welsh writer and antiquarian scholar

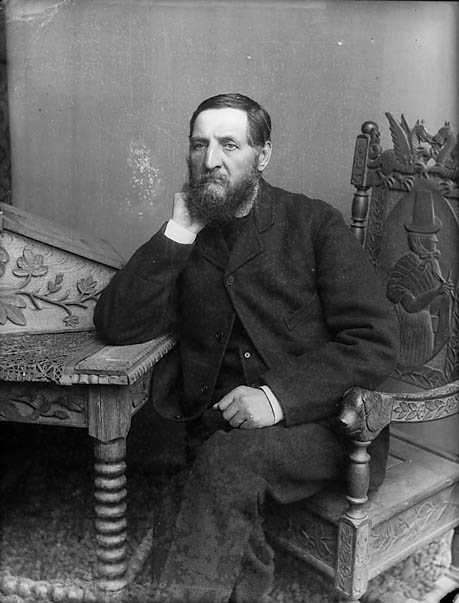
- Born: John Jones; 1836; Llangian, Wales
- Died: 27 July 1921 (aged 84–85); Chwilog, Wales
- Occupations: Blacksmith, antiquarian, poet

John Jones (1836 – 27 July 1921), better known under his nom de plume Myrddin Fardd, was a Welsh writer and antiquarian scholar born at Tan-y-Ffordd in the village of Mynytho, Llangian, Caernarfonshire. He was a translator and a collector of folklore.

Jones was the son of John and Ann Owen, and had an older brother named Owain, who wrote for periodicals such as Y Brython and Golud yr Oes. He had an elementary education at Foel-gron School in Mynytho, after which he was apprenticed to a smith at Llanystumdwy. He remained in the blacksmith's trade for most of his life, setting up in business at Chwilog, but from 1861 onwards he was also a regular competitor at eisteddfodau, both as a poet and a prose writer. His first book, Golygawd o Ben Carreg yr Imbill, Gerllaw Pwllheli, was published in 1858.

Owain's death in 1866 left John the task of continuing his research. He researched in parish registers and graveyards throughout Wales, and collected manuscripts and old letters, most of which are now in the collection of the National Library of Wales. Much of the folklore he recorded was a result of oral questioning of individuals. His 1908 book Llên Gwerin Sir Gaernarfon (Caernarfonshire Folklore) is considered his best work; it consists of folk tales from the former Caernarfonshire (now western Conwy and northern Gwynedd), collected from many sources and summarised with his own comments and explanations. However, some of his research is considered by later scholars such as T. Gwynn Jones and Georges Dumézil to have been negligent.

== Works ==
- Golygawd o Ben Carreg yr Imbill, Gerllaw Pwllheli (1858)
- Adgof Uwch Anghof (1883)
- Gleanings from God's Acre (1903)
- Cynfeirdd Lleyn (1905),
- Gwerin-Eiriau Sir Gaernarfon (1907)
- Llên Gwerin Sir Gaernarfon (1908)
- Enwogion Sir Gaernarfon (1922)
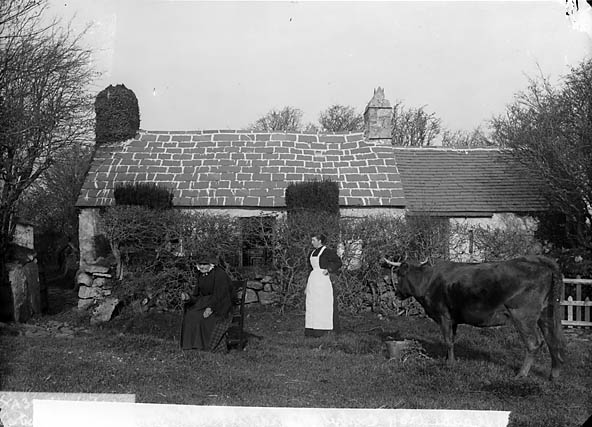
  Mother and Home of John Jones (Myrddin Fardd), Llanbedrog, c.1885
