= Emrys ap Iwan =

Welsh literary critic and writer (1848–1906)

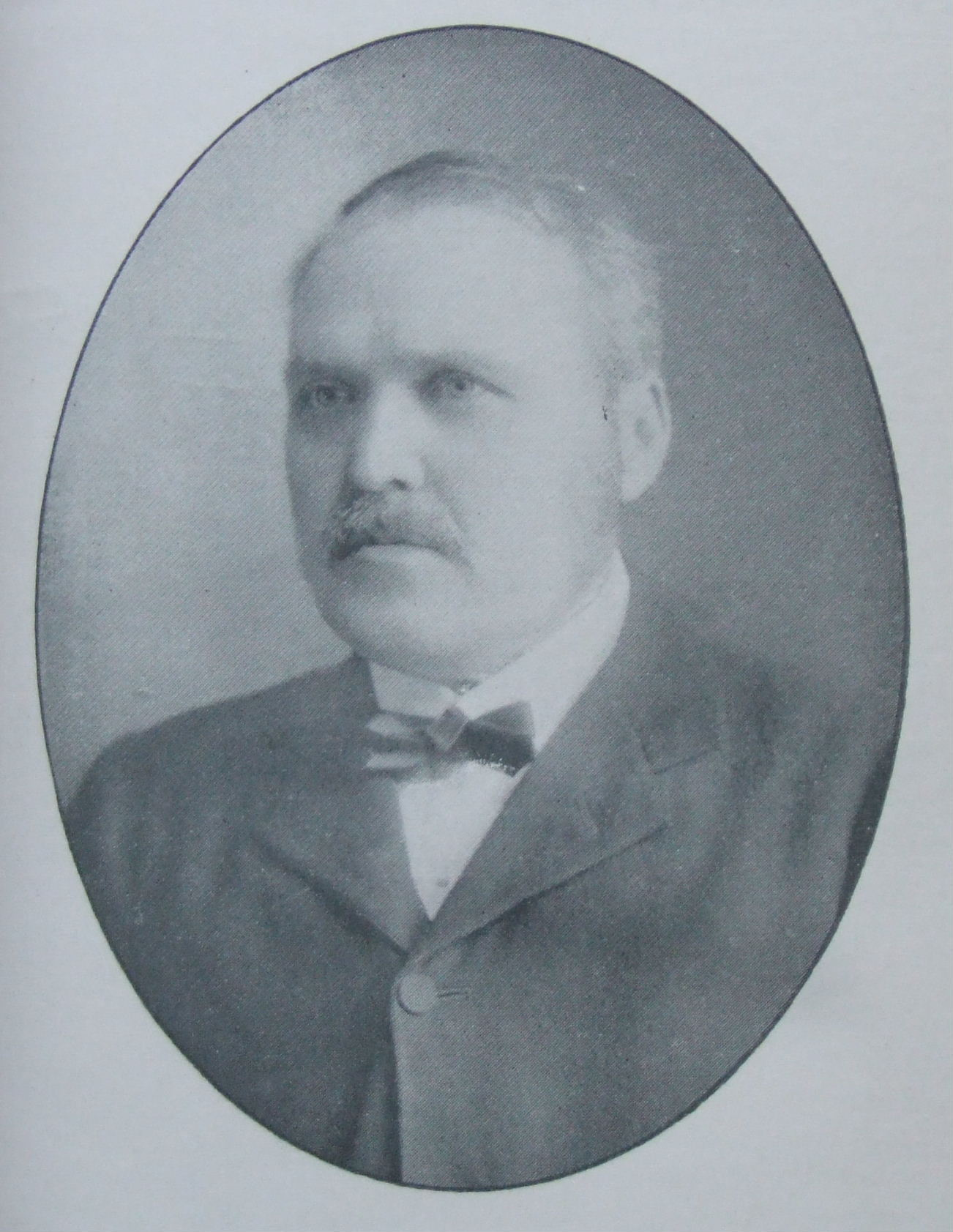
Emrys ap Iwan

Emrys ap Iwan (born Robert Ambrose Jones; 24 March 1848 – 6 January 1906) was a Welsh literary critic and writer on politics and religion. He is often seen as one of the most important forerunners of modern Welsh nationalism.

Born in Abergele, Denbighshire, Emrys was the son of a gardener who was employed on a nearby estate. After working in a shop in Liverpool for a time he trained at Bala Theological College. In 1874, he went to Lausanne, Switzerland, to teach English in a private school and to study languages, developing a love of the French language and literature which had a great influence on his later writings. He later went to Germany to teach English in Bonn and Gießen.

On Emrys's return to Wales, the Calvinistic Methodist church refused to ordain him a minister because of his opposition to the policy of building English-language chapels in mainly Welsh-speaking areas of Wales. He was eventually ordained a minister in 1884 and then served as a pastor to several churches in Denbighshire, including Rhewl and Ruthin, for the rest of his life.

Emrys ap Iwan was a fervent advocate of the Welsh language and of Welsh nationalism and believed in self-government for Wales within a federal system of government. He was a prolific writer of newspaper articles in Welsh, three volumes of which were later published, as were two volumes of his sermons. He was a significant influence on the development of 20th-century Welsh political nationalism; a new generation became aware of his life and work through T. Gwynn Jones's biography, first published in 1912.

A secondary school in Abergele is named Ysgol Emrys ap Iwan in his honour.
