= T. Marchant Williams =

Welsh nationalist author (1845–1914)

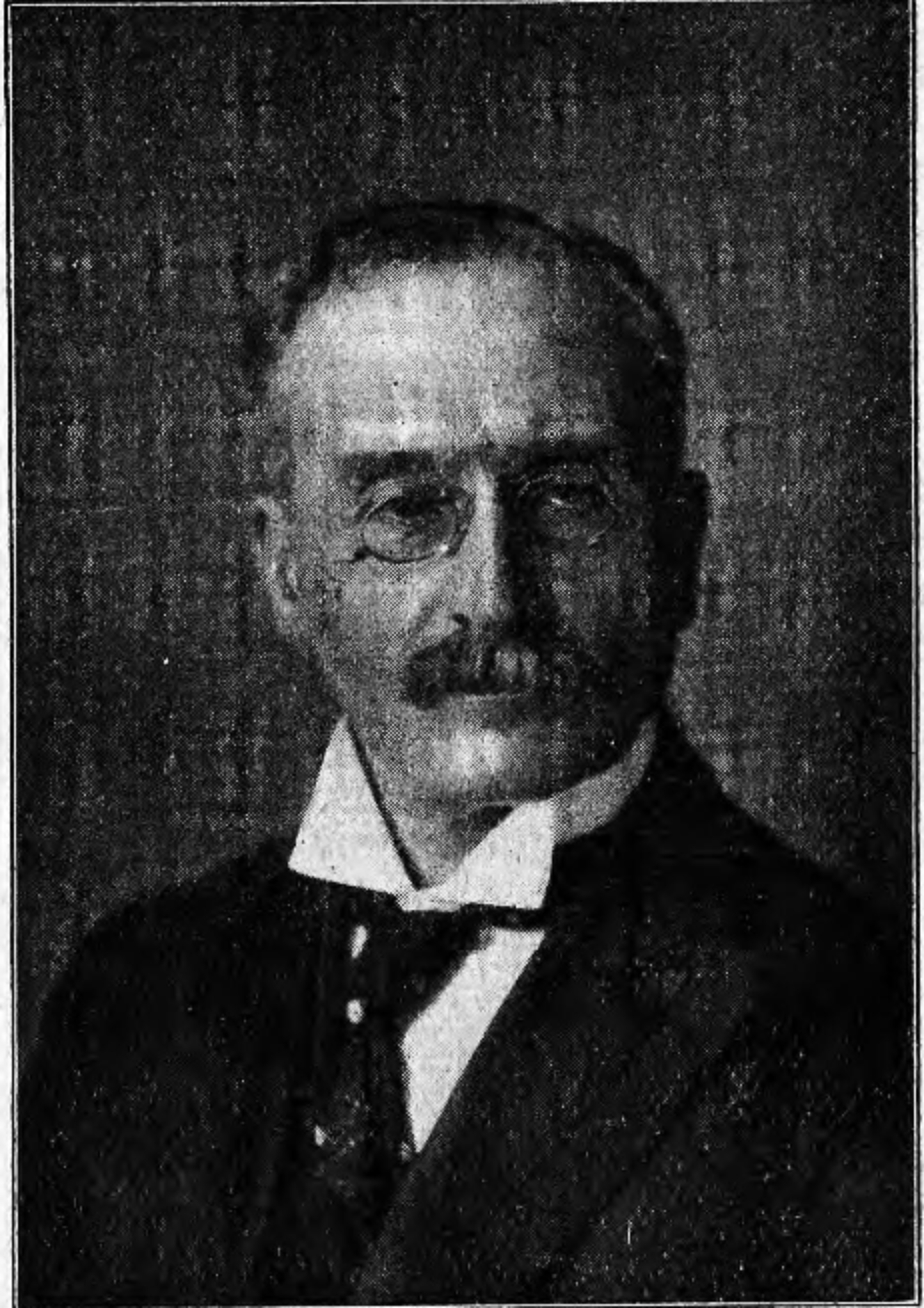
Sir Thomas Marchant Williams

Sir Thomas Marchant Williams, writing name T. Marchant Williams, (1845 – 27 October 1914) was a Welsh nationalist, lawyer, and author.

Williams was one of the first students of Aberystwyth University and later received a BA from the University of London. He went on to study law and be active in Welsh associations. In early 1900 he was appointed stipendiary magistrate at Merthyr Tydfil. Williams founded the paper The Nationalist. Among his works are The Welsh Members of Parliament and poems such as The Cloud. He received a knighthood by 1905.
