= Rowland Williams (Hwfa Môn) =

Welsh poet and minister (1823–1905)

Y Prifardd Hwfa Môn
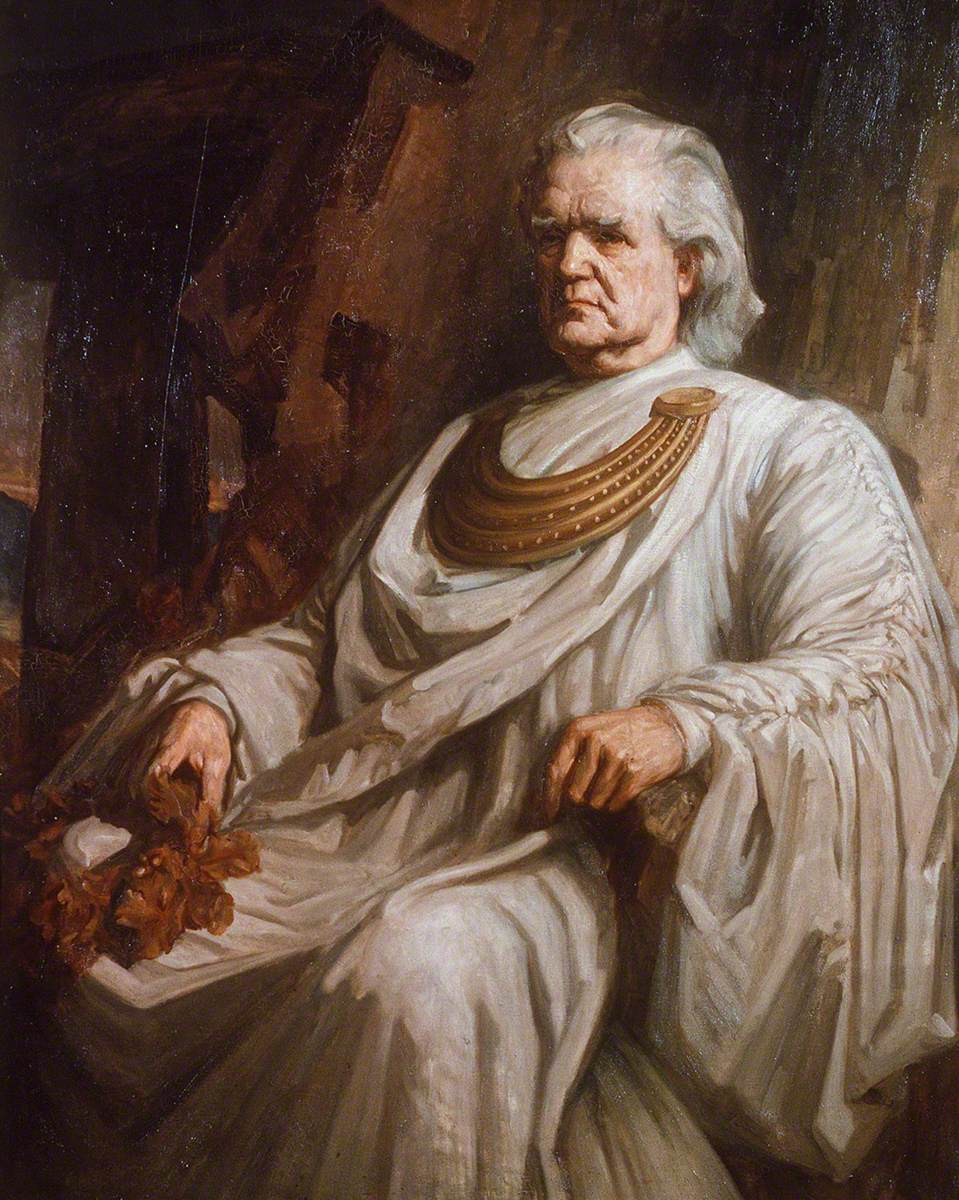
- Portrait by Christopher Williams (1905)
- Born: Rowland Williams; March 1823; Pen y Graig, Trefdraeth, Anglesey, Wales
- Died: 10 November 1905 (aged 82); Llys Hwfa, 11 River Street, Rhyl, Flintshire, Wales
- Resting place: Municipal Cemetery, Rhyl, Flintshire, Wales
- Occupations: Christian Minister. Avocation: poet and "Archdruid", (head of the Eisteddfod national arts festival)
- Style: Cynghanedd
- Spouse: Mary Evans née Williams
- Parent(s): Robert and Gwen Williams
- Awards: National Eisteddfod Chair (1862, 1873 & 1878); National Eisteddfod Crown (1867)

Reverend Rowland Williams (March 1823 – 10 November 1905), commonly known by his bardic name "Hwfa Môn", was a Welsh clergyman and poet, who served as Archdruid of the National Eisteddfod of Wales from 1895 to 1905.

== Early life and education ==
Rowland Williams was born at Pen y Graig in Trefdraeth, Anglesey, in 1823, the son of Robert Williams, an agricultural labourer, and his wife Gwen. When he was 5 years old he moved with his family to the village of Rhostrehwfa, near Llangefni.

At the age of 14 Rowland was apprenticed to a carpenter in Llangefni; after learning his trade he worked as a carpenter in the Bangor area for a few years. In 1847 he was made a lay preacher in the Independent church in Llangefni and later the same year he entered Bala Theological College to train for the ministry, where he studied until 1851.

== Ministry ==
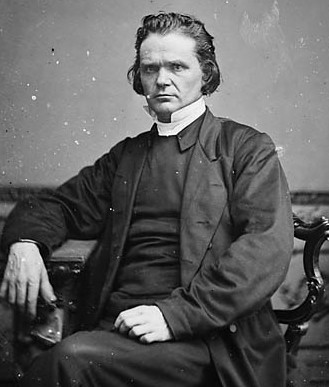
Photograph by John Thomas, c. 1875

He was ordained as a Congregationalist minister in Flint on 4 June 1851 and served as the joint minister for the congregations in Flint and Bagillt. In 1855 he moved to minister to congregations in Wrexham and Brymbo; from there he moved to Bethesda in 1852. Following a five-year period in Bethesda he was appointed minister of the Welsh Congregationalist Chapel in Fetter Lane, London, in 1862. He remained there until 1881, when he returned to Anglesey to become a minister at Llanerchymedd. His last appointment was to Llangollen in 1888; he remained there until his retirement in 1893.

== The poet ==
It is not known when or where Hwfa Môn learned the cynghanedd, or who taught him, but he was considered a sufficient master of the bardic craft to be inaugurated as a bard at the Aberffraw Eisteddfod in 1849 at the relatively young age of 26. He took the bardic name Hwfa Môn (The Wise Owl of Anglesey) from the place where he lived: Rhostrehwfa.

He was the Chaired Bard in the 1862 Caernarfon Eisteddfod, the 1873 Mold Eisteddfod and the 1878 Birkenhead Eisteddfod. He was also the first-ever Crowned Bard, winning that honour at Carmarthen in 1867.

Like many of his generation he was a master of the mechanics of cynghanedd, but was not much of a poet; he was a slave of the strict meter rather than its master. As R. Williams Parry said, "Hwfa Môn oedd y creadur tebycaf i fardd a fagwyd erioed yng Nghymru. Ac yn fardd ar ben hynny na ellir byth ei gael yn euog o ysgrifennu yr un llinell o farddoniaeth" ("Hwfa Môn was the creature most like a bard ever bred in Wales. But, despite that, a bard who could never be found guilty of writing a single line of poetry").

Very little of his poetic work is considered of any value today. However, had it not been for bards of his generation keeping the tradition of cynghanedd alive through those dark and unproductive days, strict meter might have fallen out of use and the revival of a golden age of cynghanedd in the 20th century might not have happened.

== The Gorsedd ==
As Hwfa Môn, he is best known for his association with the National Eisteddfod of Wales and especially for his part in making the Gorsedd of Bards an integral part of the Eisteddfod's pageantry. With Iolo Morganwg and Cynan, Hwfa Môn is the second part of the triad responsible for the creation of the modern Gorsedd.

In 1905 his portrait was painted by Christopher Williams wearing his Gorsedd robes as Archdruid.

== Marriage, death and burial ==
He married Mrs Mary Evans, a widow, née Williams, in 1853. He retired to Rhyl in 1893, where he died on 10 November 1905. He is buried in Rhyl's municipal cemetery.

Preceded by David Griffith (Clwydfardd)	Archdruid of the National Eisteddfod of Wales; 1895–1905	Succeeded by Evan Rees (Dyfed)
