= Watkin Williams (bishop) =

British priest (1845–1944)

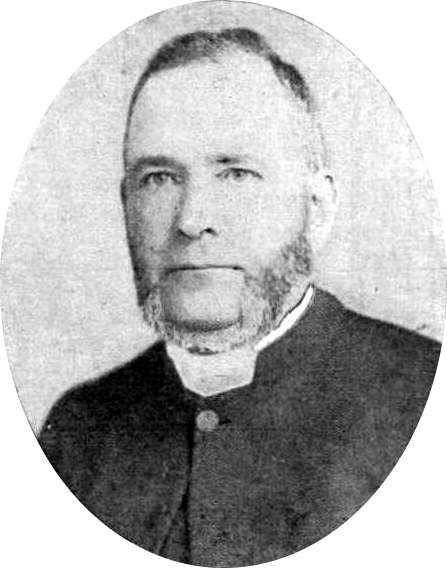
Photograph of Bishop Watkin Herbert Williams

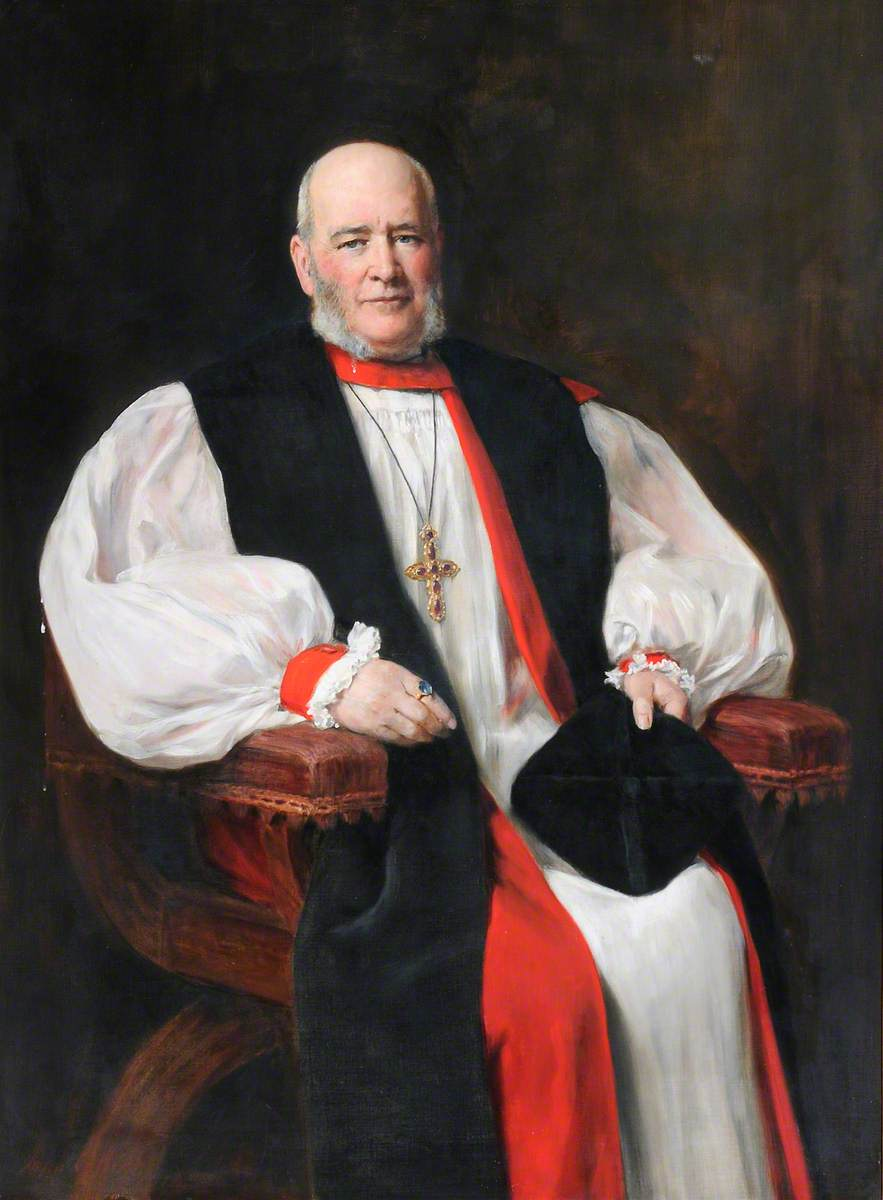
Watkin Williams by John Collier.

Watkin Herbert Williams (died 19 November 1944) was Dean of St Asaph from 1892 to 1899. and Bishop of Bangor from 1899 to 1925.

Williams was educated at Westminster School and Christ Church, Oxford and ordained in 1871. His first post was a curacy at Rhosllanerchrugog. He was vicar of Bodelwyddan from 1872 to 1892 and Archdeacon of St Asaph from 1889 to 1892.

He was a very active Freemason, initiated as a student in 1868 in Oxford's Apollo University Lodge. In Wales he joined the Royal Denbigh Lodge, and became its Worshipful Master in 1883, becoming Provincial Grand Chaplain for North Wales in the same year. He became the Grand Chaplain of the United Grand Lodge of England, the most senior clerical appointment in Freemasonry, in 1898.

Church of England titles
Preceded by John Owen	Dean of St Asaph; 1892–1899	Succeeded by Shadrach Pryce
Preceded by Daniel Lewis Lloyd	Bishop of Bangor; 1899–1925	Succeeded by Daniel Davies
