= Richard Lewis (bishop of Llandaff) =

Anglican bishop (1821–1905)

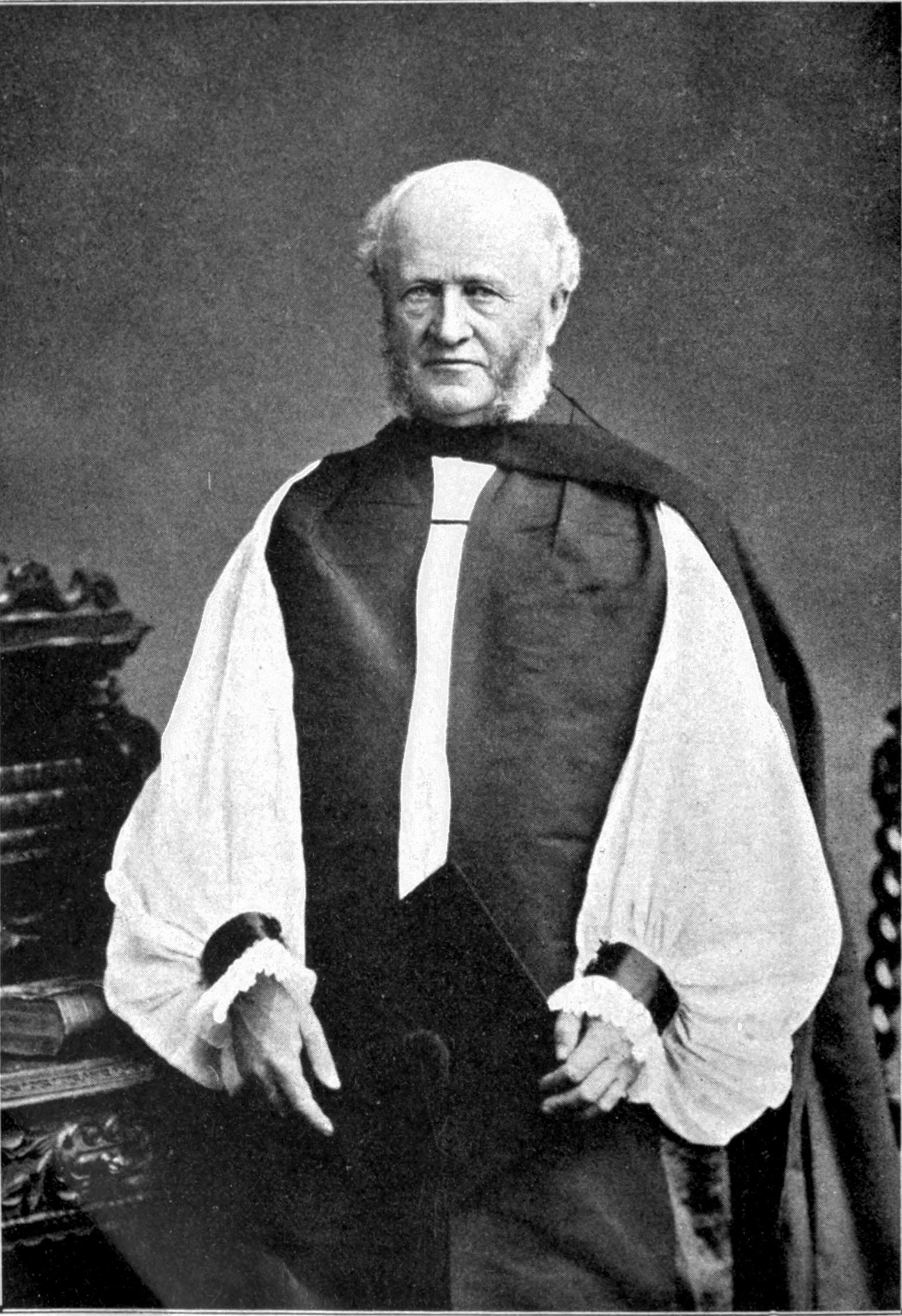
The Revd Richard Lewis, the Bishop of Llandaff

Richard Lewis (27 March 1821 – 24 January 1905) was the Anglican Bishop of Llandaff in Wales from 1883 to 1905.

Born in Pembrokeshire, Lewis was educated at Bromsgrove School and Worcester College, Oxford and ordained in 1846. He was Vicar of Amroth 1847 to 1851, Rector of Lampeter Velfrey for 32 years and from 1874 to 1883 the Archdeacon of St David's.

He was the brother of John Lennox Griffith Poyer Lewis, Esq. of Henllan and High Sheriff of Carmarthenshire in 1867.

Lewis was a very active Freemason, initiated as a student in 1843 in Oxford's Apollo University Lodge. In 1896, whilst serving as Bishop of Llandaff, he became the Grand Chaplain of the United Grand Lodge of England, succeeding the Bishop of Barrow-in-Furness, the Rt Revd Henry Ware.

Church in Wales titles
Preceded by Alfred Ollivant	Bishop of Llandaff; 1883–1905	Succeeded by Joshua Pritchard Hughes
