= Sir Richard Williams-Bulkeley, 12th Baronet =

English sailor, yachting enthusiast and public official

Commodore Sir Richard Williams-Bulkeley Bt KCB VD JP
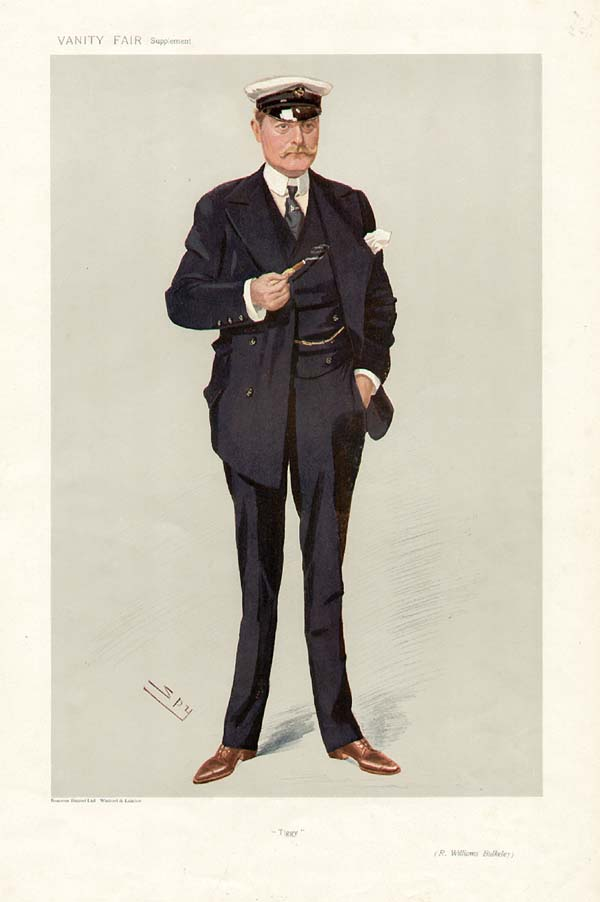
- Caricature of Sir R Bulkeley Bt, by Leslie Ward, Vanity Fair, 7 August 1907

Lord Lieutenant of Anglesey
- In office 30 November 1896 – 7 July 1942
- Preceded by: Richard Davies
- Succeeded by: The Marquess of Anglesey

High Sheriff of Anglesey
- In office 1887–1887
- Preceded by: David Hughes
- Succeeded by: Henry Herbert Williams

Personal details
- Born: Richard Henry Williams-Bulkeley; 4 December 1862
- Died: 7 July 1942 (aged 79)
- Spouse: Lady Magdalen Yorke (m. 1885; died 1940)
- Relations: Sir Richard Williams-Bulkeley, 10th Baronet (grandfather); Henry Bingham Baring (grandfather); Sir Godfrey Baring, 1st Baronet (cousin)
- Children: 4
- Parent(s): Sir Richard Williams-Bulkeley, 11th Baronet; Mary Emily Baring
- Education: Eton College

Sir Richard Henry Williams-Bulkeley, 12th Baronet KCB VD JP (4 December 1862 – 7 July 1942) was a British sailor, yachting enthusiast and public official.

== Early life ==
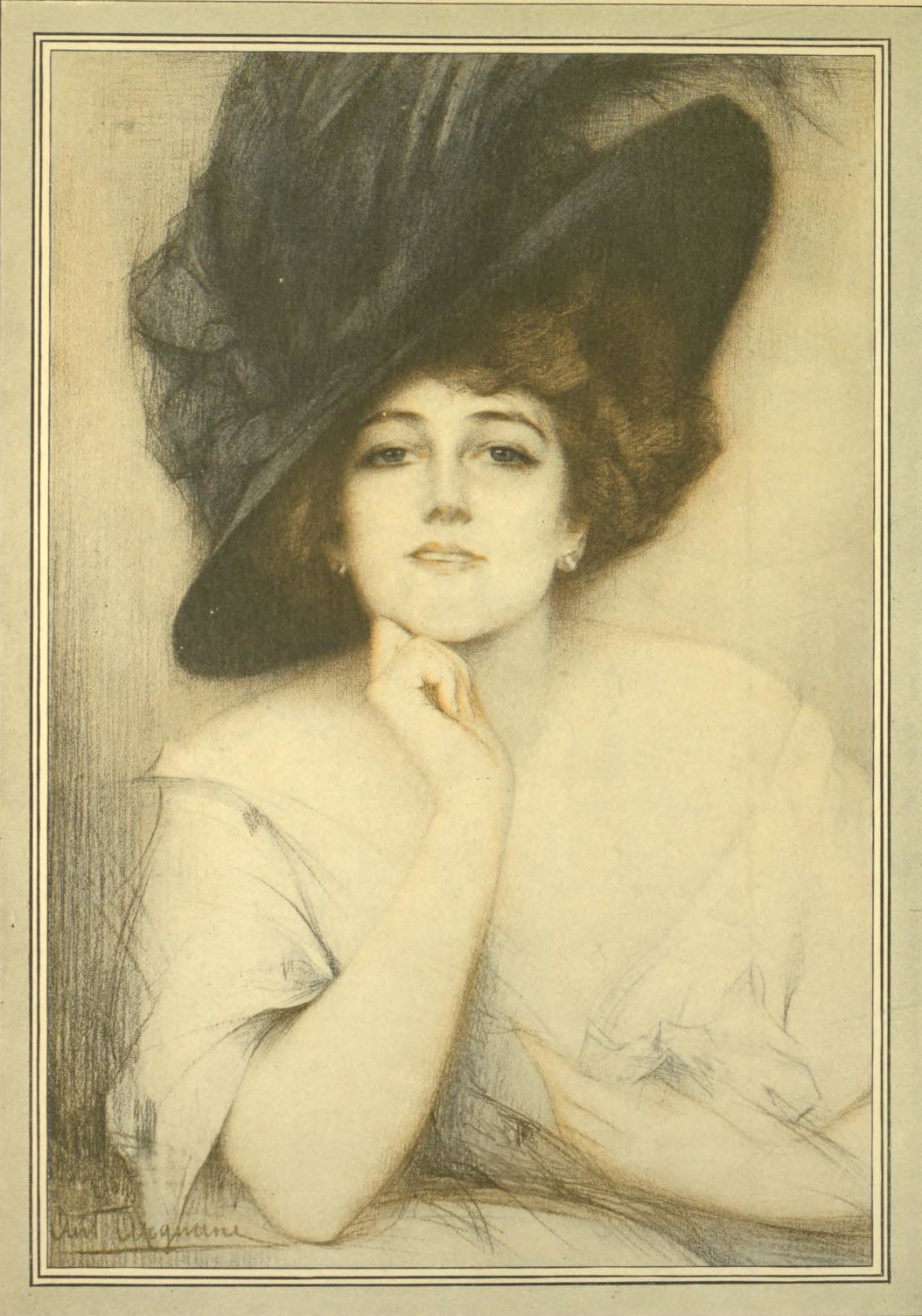
Pastel portrait of his younger half-sister, Bridget (née Williams-Bulkeley) Guinness, 1909

Williams-Bulkeley was born on 4 December 1862. He was the son of heiress Mary Emily Baring and Capt. Sir Richard Llewellyn Mostyn Williams-Bulkeley, 11th Baronet, of the Royal Horse Guards. In 1864, his father divorced his mother after alleging she committed adultery with Lt.-Col. Henry Armitage of the Coldstream Guards. He then married Margaret Elizabeth Peers Williams (a daughter of Lt.-Col. Thomas Peers Williams), in 1866. His mother married Lt. John Oakley Maund (a son of William Herbert Maund) in 1867. From his father's second marriage, he had a younger half-sister, Bridget Henrietta Frances Williams-Bulkeley (who married Benjamin Seymour Guinness and was the mother of Gp. Capt. Loel Guinness and Meraud Guinness).

His paternal grandparents were Sir Richard Williams-Bulkeley, 10th Baronet and Maria Frances Massey-Stanley (a daughter of Sir Thomas Stanley-Massey-Stanley, 9th Baronet). His maternal grandparents were Maj. Henry Bingham Baring and Lady Augusta Brudenell (a daughter of Robert Brudenell, 6th Earl of Cardigan). Among his first cousins were Sir Godfrey Baring, 1st Baronet.

While attending Eton, he succeeded his father as the 12th Baronet Williams, of Penrhyn, County Caernarvon on 28 January 1884.

== Career ==
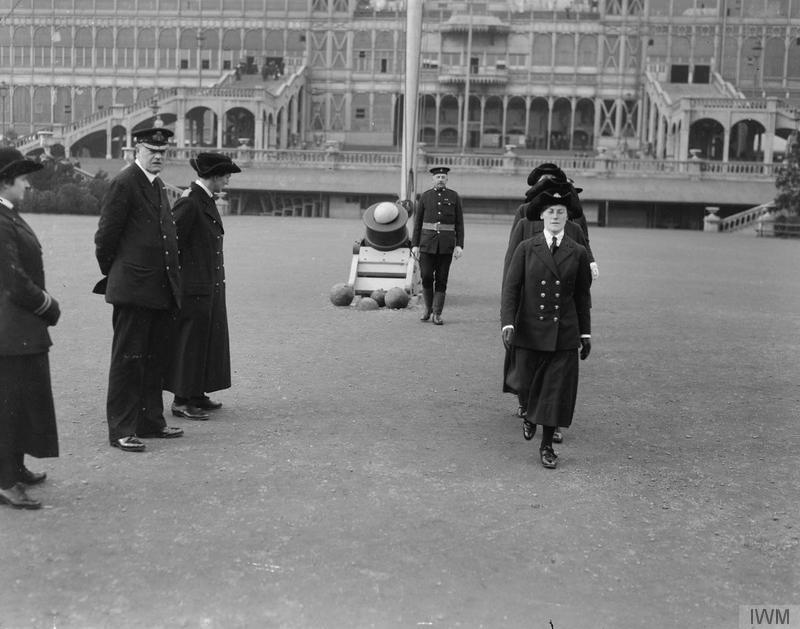
Officers of the Women's Royal Naval Service marching past Dame Katharine Furse (Director) and Commodore Sir Richard Williams Baulkley, 12th Baronet, at Crystal Palace.

He gained the rank of Lieutenant in the Royal Naval Artillery Volunteers' Liverpool Brigade and also held the rank of Lieutenant colonel in the British Army, commanding the Royal Anglesey Royal Engineering Militia. He was awarded the Royal Naval Volunteer Reserve Officers' Decoration. Sir Richard was also a Younger Brethren of Trinity House, and in 1914, he commanded the Royal Naval Depot at the Crystal Palace, London.

He served as mayor of Beaumaris in 1885 and 1893. He held the office of High Sheriff of Anglesey in 1887 and was Lord Lieutenant of Anglesey in 1896. He also served as Justice of the Peace for Carnarvonshire.

He was appointed Companion of the Order of the Bath in 1916 and Knight Commander of the Order of the Bath in 1922. He was also made a Commander of the Most Venerable Order of the Hospital of St. John of Jerusalem.

Williams-Bulkeley was described as the "largest landowner in Wales" and for that reason, the "King of Wales," as he also "traced his descent, in common with the royal House of Tudor, from Marchudd Ap Cynan, a friend of Rhodi Mawr, ninth century King of Wales." He inherited the family seat, Baron Hill, Anglesey, and his lands in Wales included "Snowdon, the loftiest mountain in Wales and England, whose principal peak, Y-Wyddfa, rises 3,560 feet above the sea, and Beaumaris Castle, a historic pile on the Isle of Anglesey, North Wales." In 1920, he "sold part of his Anglesey estate, including most of the town of Beaumaris, for over $500,000. In 1921, it was reported that Snowdon was for sale and in 1926, it was announced that he had presented Beaumaris Castle to the British nation." (Note: Thomas Bulkeley, 7th Viscount Bulkeley had bought Beaumaris Castle from the Crown in 1807 for £735, incorporating it into the park that surrounded his local residence, Baron Hill. Some of the castle's stones may have been reused in 1829 to build the nearby Beaumaris Gaol. In 1925, Williams-Bulkeley retained the freehold and placed the Beaumaris Castle into the care of the Commissioners of Works, who then carried out a large scale restoration programme.)

=== Yachting ===
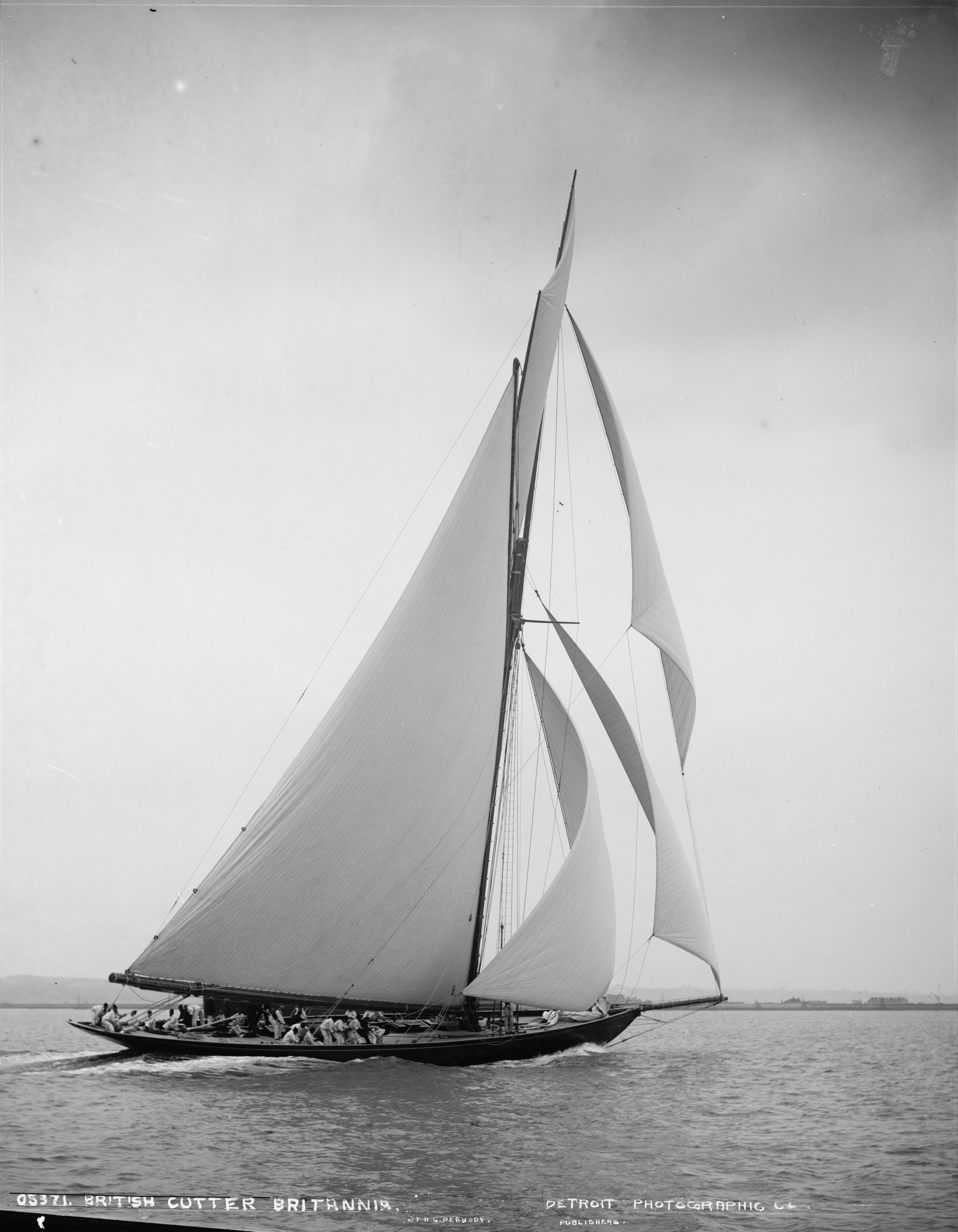
Williams-Bulkeley's cutter, the Britannia, c. 1899

A member of the Royal Yacht Squadron for 58 years, he was the first Royal Naval Reserve officer to be appointed Commodore of the Squadron in 1927. He gained "the distinction of having owned more yachts than any other member, including for a brief period the royal yacht Britannia, raced by the Prince of Wales, later King Edward VII". The gaff-rigged cutter had been ordered by the Prince of Wales in 1892 and designed by George Lennox Watson. It was completed in 1893 and Williams-Bulkeley owned and raced it between 1899 and 1900 after which it was owned and used by the King for cruising.

== Personal life ==
On 10 December 1885, Williams-Bulkeley was married to Lady Magdalen Yorke (1865–1940), a daughter of Charles Yorke, 5th Earl of Hardwicke and Lady Sophia Wellesley (a daughter of Henry Wellesley, 1st Earl Cowley). Together, they were the parents of:

- Major Richard Gerard Wellesley Williams-Bulkeley (1887–1918), who married Victoria "Vita" Alexandrina Stella Legge, daughter of Hon. Sir Henry Charles Legge, in 1909. He died in March 1918 from wounds received in action in World War I.
- Generis Alma Windham Williams-Bulkeley (1889–1946), who married Sir Harry Mainwaring, 5th Baronet in 1913.
- Æira Helen Williams-Bulkeley (1891–1964), who married John Chadwick, son of T. S. Chadwick, in 1921.
- Siriol Penelope Diana Katherine Williams-Bulkeley (1902–1975), who married Capt. Vivian Francis Bulkeley-Johnson, son of Francis Head Bulkeley-Johnson, in 1924. They divorced in 1947 and he married the American heiress, and fellow divorcee, Cornelia Stuyvesant Cecil (née Vanderbilt).

Sir Richard died at his home in Anglesey on 7 July 1942 at age 79. As his only son predeceased him, he was succeeded in the baronetcy by his grandson, Lt.-Col. Richard Harry David Williams-Bulkeley (1911–1992).

Honorary titles
Preceded by David Hughes	High Sheriff of Anglesey; 1887–1887	Succeeded by Henry Herbert Williams
Preceded by Richard Davies	Lord Lieutenant of Anglesey; 1896–1942	Succeeded by The Marquess of Anglesey
Baronetage of England
Preceded by Richard Mostyn Lewis Williams-Bulkeley	Baronet (of Penrhyn); 1884–1942	Succeeded by Richard Harry David Williams-Bulkeley
