= A. G. Edwards (bishop) =

First archbishop of the Church in Wales (1848–1937)

The Right Reverend A. G. Edwards
- Archbishop of Wales
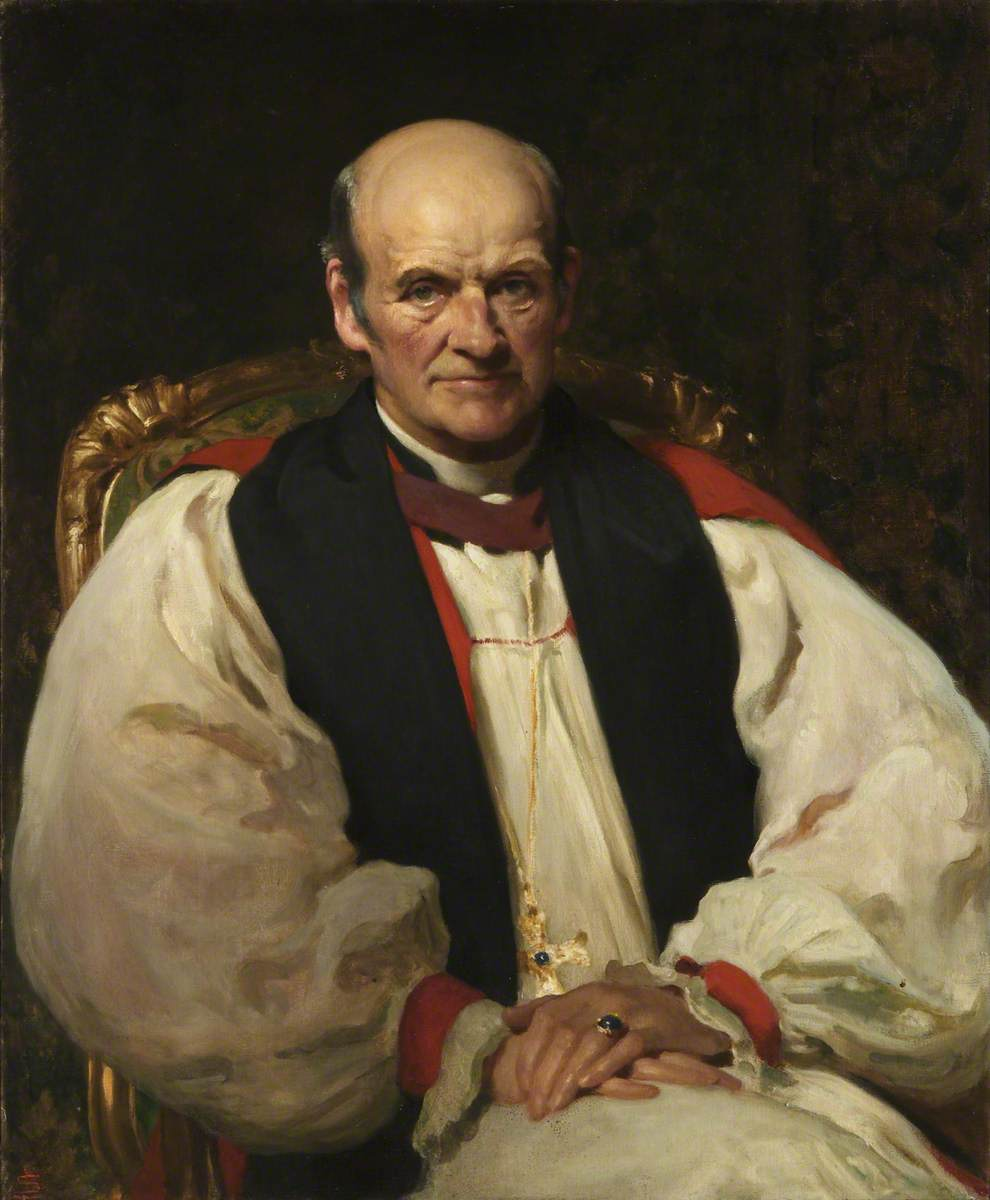
- Portrait by Solomon Joseph Solomon, 1924
- Church: Church in Wales
- Diocese: St Asaph
- Elected: 1920
- In office: 1920–1934
- Successor: Charles Green

Orders
- Ordination: 1875
- Consecration: 1889
- Rank: Archbishop

Personal details
- Born: 2 November 1848 Llanymawddwy, Gwynedd, Wales
- Died: 22 July 1937 (aged 88)
- Education: Jesus College, Oxford

Alfred George Edwards (2 November 1848 – 22 July 1937), known as A. G. Edwards, was elected the first archbishop of the disestablished Church in Wales.

The son of a priest of the Church of England, Edwards was born in Llanymawddwy in Gwynedd. He studied at Jesus College, Oxford, before being appointed warden of Llandovery College in 1875. In the same year he was ordained as a priest and in 1885 he was appointed the vicar of St Peter's Church, Carmarthen.

In 1889, Edwards was appointed the Bishop of St Asaph: he was elected on 2 March at St Asaph Cathedral and consecrated a bishop on Lady Day 1889 (25 March), by Frederick Temple, Archbishop of Canterbury, at Westminster Abbey. He was a strong defender of the rights of the established Church of England in Wales in the face of mounting call for disestablishment from the nonconformist and liberal majority.

He was Honorary Chaplain to the Denbighshire Yeomanry from 2 August 1902.

When the Church of England in Wales was disestablished and became the Church in Wales in 1920, he was elected the first Archbishop of Wales by his fellow Welsh bishops on 7 April 1920. From 1928 onwards he was assisted by Thomas Lloyd, Bishop of Maenan, the only example of an assistant bishop being given a territorial title in the history of the Church in Wales until 2024 when David Thomas Morris was consecrated and given the title Bishop of Bardsey. Thomas Lloyd retired in 1934, died in 1937 and was buried at St Asaph.

Church in Wales titles
Preceded by Joshua Hughes	Bishop of St Asaph; 1889–1934	Succeeded by William Havard
New title	Archbishop of Wales; 1920–1934	Succeeded by Charles Green
