= W. R. M. Wynne =

William Robert Maurice Wynne
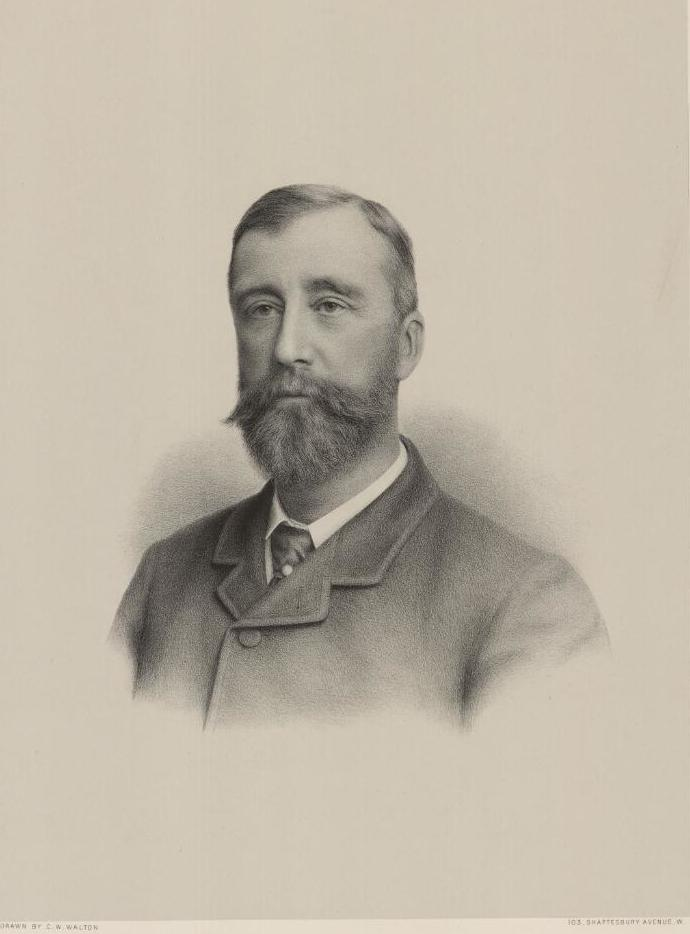
- Born: 1840
- Died: 1909 (aged 68–69)
- Occupation: Politician
- Parent: William Watkin Edward Wynne

William Robert Maurice Wynne of Peniarth, Merionethshire (15 February 1840 – 5 February 1909), often referred to as W.R.M. Wynne, was a Conservative politician and prominent landowner who also made a notable contribution to the cultural life of Wales by donating the Peniarth Manuscripts to the National Library of Wales, Aberystwyth. Wynne also served as Conservative MP for Merioneth from 1865 to 1868. He stood down in 1868 when facing likely defeat by the Liberal candidate David Williams, following the Second Reform Act.

== Early life ==
Wynne was the eldest son of William Watkin Edward Wynne of Peniarth and Mary Slaney, daughter of Robert Aglionby Slaney MP. He was educated at Eton and later served in the Scots Guards. In 1891, he married Winifred Frances Williamson, the widow of another landowner.

== Parliamentary career ==
=== The 1865 General Election ===
Wynne's father having served as MP for Merionethshire from 1852 until 1865. the 1859 General Election was characterised by allegations of coercion against tenant farmers who supported the Liberal challenger David Williams in an election noted for allegations of coercion. In 1865, his father retired and Wynne succeeds him as Conservative candidate. The Liberal press in North Wales was optimistic that the Liberals would capture the seat on this occasion and advised Wynne to withdraw. However, the Liberal campaign lacked organisation, and very few public meetings were held. Wynne held the seat with a slightly reduced majority, and this has been attributed by Ieuan Gwynedd Jones to 'a sense of terror' that had struck the mainly nonconformist tenant farmers.

=== The 1868 General Election and retirement from Parliament ===
In 1868, following the extension of the franchise, some Conservative supporting newspapers believed that the 1867 Reform Act would actually benefit the Conservatives, especially after a revision of the electoral register resulted in the removal of a large number of electors in the Liberal stronghold of Ffestiniog. Eventually, however, Wynne withdrew rather than face another contest which he was likely to lose. was elected unopposed.

=== Attempted comeback: the 1885 General Election ===
Following the extension of the franchise in 1884, Wynne contested Merionethshire again at the 1885 General Election. Despite divisions in the Liberal ranks he was unsuccessful. The Liberals held the seat until 1951.

== Local Government and Administration ==
Following his withdrawal from parliamentary life, Wynne remained very active within local government. He served as High Sheriff of Merionethshire in 1886 and was Lord Lieutenant of Merionethshire from 1891 until his death. Wynne served as Chairman of the Merionethshire Quarter Sessions, was also a magistrate for Montgomeryshire and Carnarvonshire, and served as constable of Harlech Castle. He was also a member of Merionethshire County Council from its formation in 1889 until his death, one of comparatively few Conservative members.

Wynne held extensive estates, totaling over 9,000 acres, primarily in Merionethshire. Although unable to speak Welsh fluently he was said to be on good terms with his tenantry. Some farms on the estate were said, at the time of Wynne's death, to have been held for forty years without an increase in rent.

== Literary interests ==
At Peniarth, Wynne had inherited the celebrated library including the Peniarth Manuscripts. His grandfather, William Wynne of Peniarth (1774-1834), was an avid collector of manuscripts, and his father had not only inherited this collection but also acquired the Hengwrt collection of manuscripts, gathered together originally by Robert Vaughan in the seventeenth century. A few years before his death, Wynne agreed with Sir John Williams that the collection would be transferred after his death to the National Library of Wales where it forms an important part of the archive.

== Death ==
Wynne died at Buckingham Gate, London, on 5 February 1909. He was buried in the family vault at Llanegryn and the Dean of Bangor officiated at the funeral service. Tenants from the estate officiated as bearers at the funeral.

In a mark of respect for Wynne, his successor as MP for Merionethshire, Osmond Williams, cancelled all political engagements in the constituency in the week following his death.

== Sources ==
=== Books and Journals ===
- Jones, Ieuan Gwynedd (1981). Explorations and Explanations. Essays in the Social History of Victorian Wales. Llandysul: Gomer. ISBN 0850886449.
- Freeman, Peter (2000). "The effect of the Oxford Movement on some election campaigns in Wales in the mid-nineteenth century". National Library of Wales Journal. 31 (4): 369–80.
