= 1908 in Wales =

- Centuries: 18th; 19th; 20th; 21st
- Decades: 1880s; 1890s; 1900s; 1910s; 1920s
- See also: List of years in Wales; Timeline of Welsh history 1908 in The United Kingdom Scotland Elsewhere

This article is about the particular significance of the year 1908 to Wales and its people.

== Incumbents ==
- Archdruid of the National Eisteddfod of Wales – Dyfed
- Lord Lieutenant of Anglesey – Sir Richard Henry Williams-Bulkeley, 12th Baronet
- Lord Lieutenant of Brecknockshire – Joseph Bailey, 2nd Baron Glanusk
- Lord Lieutenant of Caernarvonshire – John Ernest Greaves
- Lord Lieutenant of Cardiganshire – Herbert Davies-Evans
- Lord Lieutenant of Carmarthenshire – Sir James Williams-Drummond, 4th Baronet
- Lord Lieutenant of Denbighshire – William Cornwallis-West
- Lord Lieutenant of Flintshire – Hugh Robert Hughes
- Lord Lieutenant of Glamorgan – Robert Windsor-Clive, 1st Earl of Plymouth
- Lord Lieutenant of Merionethshire – W. R. M. Wynne
- Lord Lieutenant of Monmouthshire – Godfrey Morgan, 1st Viscount Tredegar
- Lord Lieutenant of Montgomeryshire – Sir Herbert Williams-Wynn, 7th Baronet
- Lord Lieutenant of Pembrokeshire – Frederick Campbell, 3rd Earl Cawdor
- Lord Lieutenant of Radnorshire – Powlett Milbank
- Bishop of Bangor – Watkin Williams
- Bishop of Llandaff – Joshua Pritchard Hughes
- Bishop of St Asaph – A. G. Edwards (later Archbishop of Wales)
- Bishop of St Davids – John Owen

== Events ==
- 22 January – J. Lloyd Williams delivers his paper on Welsh National Melodies and Folk-Songs to the Honourable Society of Cymmrodorion.
- 28 January – In a colliery explosion at Ammanford, David Rees Griffiths is seriously injured. His brother is one of two men killed.
- March – The Local Authorities (Admission of the Press) Act, 1908 is passed as a result of a challenge by Frank Mason, editor of the Tenby Observer, after the local council tried to ban him from their meetings.
- 26 February – In the West Carmarthenshire by-election, the sitting Liberal MP, John Lloyd Morgan, retains the seat in the absence of any other candidates.
- 5 March – Edgeworth David leads the party attempting the ascent of Mount Erebus in the Antarctic.
- 8 April – The Mawddwy Railway is closed to its remaining (freight) traffic.
- 18 June – A giant turtle weighing half a ton is pulled from the sea at Pwllheli.
- 16 July – In the Pembrokeshire by-election, brought about by elevation to the peerage of the incumbent Liberal MP, John Wynford Philipps, the seat is retained for the Liberals by Walter Francis Roch.
- 1 September – The barque Amazon sinks off Margam Sands, with the loss of 18 crew.
- 14 October – John Ballinger is appointed first librarian of the National Library of Wales.
- November – The North and South Wales Bank is absorbed into the London City and Midland Bank, bringing an end to banknote issue in Wales.
- 21 December – The Coal Mines Regulation Act 1908 (8 Edw. 7. c. 57) ("Eight Hours Act") limits the amount of time spent by coal miners underground.
- date unknown
  - The South Wales Miners' Federation becomes affiliated to the Labour Party.
  - A factory for making artificial silk is opened at Greenfield, Flintshire by the British Glanzstoff Manufacturing Company.
  - Construction work begins on the lighthouse at Strumble Head.
  - Spa pump room built at Caergwrle.

== Arts and literature ==
- Sydney Curnow Vosper completes his iconic watercolour of Welsh piety, Salem.

=== Awards ===
- National Eisteddfod of Wales - held in Llangollen
  - Chair - John James Williams, "Ceiriog"
  - Crown - Hugh Emyr Davies

=== New books ===
==== English language ====
- W. H. Davies - Autobiography of a Super-Tramp
- W. Jenkyn Thomas - The Welsh Fairy Book

==== Welsh language ====
- John Davies Bryan – O'r Aifft
- R. Silyn Roberts – Y Blaid Lafur Anibynnol, ei Hanes a'i Hamcan
- Gwyneth Vaughan – Plant y Gorthrwm
- Owen Williamson – Ceris y Pwll

=== Music ===
- David Evans becomes professor of the Music department at University of Wales, Cardiff.
- Harry Evans - Dafydd ap Gwilym

== Sport ==
- Boxing
  - 24 February - Jim Driscoll wins the Commonwealth featherweight title.
- Olympics
  - October - At the postponed 1908 Summer Olympics, Thomas Scott-Ellis, 8th Baron Howard de Walden, competes unsuccessfully in the motorboat racing.
- Rugby league
  - 1 January - The first-ever international match is held at Aberdare, where Wales defeat New Zealand 9 - 8. The match was won by a last minute try from former Welsh rugby union international Dai Jones.
  - Aberdare RLFC, Barry RLFC, Mid-Rhondda RLFC and Treherbert RLFC are formed, joining Ebbw Vale and Merthyr Tydfil in competing for the Welsh League, the first Welsh rugby league competition.
- Rugby union
  - Wales win their first Grand Slam and fifth Triple Crown.
  - The selection of players for the 1908 British Lions tour to New Zealand and Australia results in a comment by the Welsh Rugby Union that players for future tours should be chosen '...irrespective of the social position of the players.'

== Births ==
- 29 February – Louie Myfanwy Thomas, novelist as Jane Ann Jones (d. 1968)
- 22 March – Martin Davies, art historian (d. 1978)
- 8 May – Bert Day, Wales international rugby union player (d. 1977)
- 29 May – Diana Morgan, playwright and screenwriter (d. 1996)
- 5 July – Francis Jones, heraldic expert (d. 1993)
- 10 July – Donald Peers, singer (d. 1973)
- 12 July – Bill Roberts, footballer (d. 1976)
- 15 August – Wynford Vaughan-Thomas, journalist (d. 1987)
- 14 December – Claude Davey, Wales international rugby union player (d. 2001)

== Deaths ==
- 6 January – Lewis Pugh Pugh, lawyer and politician, 70
- 13 January – Caroline Elizabeth Williams, radical and champion of women's rights, 84
- 26 January – George Thomas Kenyon, politician, 67
- 1 February – Buckley Roderick, Wales international rugby player, 46
- 27 February – Norman Biggs, Wales international rugby player, 37
- 7 March – Richard Edwards, Welsh American educator, 85
- 21 June – Allen Raine, novelist, 71
- 24 August – William Bevan, archdeacon of Brecon, 87
- 4 September – Thomas Judson, Wales international rugby player, (c.) 51
- 19 October
  - Catherine Lynch, alcoholic held up as an example to other women, 28
  - John Henry Puleston, journalist and politician, 78
- 9 November – Solomon Andrews, entrepreneur, 73
- 1 December – Howell Jones, Wales international rugby player, 26
- 24 December – David John, Mormon leader, 75 (in Utah)

== See also ==
- 1908 in Ireland
