= 1910 in Wales =

- Centuries: 18th; 19th; 20th; 21st
- Decades: 1890s; 1900s; 1910s; 1920s; 1930s
- See also: List of years in Wales; Timeline of Welsh history 1910 in The United Kingdom Scotland Elsewhere

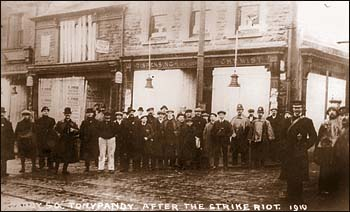
Residents standing in front of boarded-up shops damaged during the evening of November 8, 1910, known as the Tonypandy Riots, in Tonypandy, Rhondda, Wales.

This article is about the particular significance of the year 1910 to Wales and its people.

== Incumbents ==
- Archdruid of the National Eisteddfod of Wales – Dyfed
- Lord Lieutenant of Anglesey – Sir Richard Henry Williams-Bulkeley, 12th Baronet
- Lord Lieutenant of Brecknockshire – Joseph Bailey, 2nd Baron Glanusk
- Lord Lieutenant of Caernarvonshire – John Ernest Greaves
- Lord Lieutenant of Cardiganshire – Herbert Davies-Evans
- Lord Lieutenant of Carmarthenshire – Sir James Williams-Drummond, 4th Baronet
- Lord Lieutenant of Denbighshire – William Cornwallis-West
- Lord Lieutenant of Flintshire – Hugh Robert Hughes
- Lord Lieutenant of Glamorgan – Robert Windsor-Clive, 1st Earl of Plymouth
- Lord Lieutenant of Merionethshire – Sir Osmond Williams, 1st Baronet
- Lord Lieutenant of Monmouthshire – Godfrey Morgan, 1st Viscount Tredegar
- Lord Lieutenant of Montgomeryshire – Sir Herbert Williams-Wynn, 7th Baronet
- Lord Lieutenant of Pembrokeshire – Frederick Campbell, 3rd Earl Cawdor
- Lord Lieutenant of Radnorshire – Powlett Milbank
- Bishop of Bangor – Watkin Williams
- Bishop of Llandaff – Joshua Pritchard Hughes
- Bishop of St Asaph – A. G. Edwards (later Archbishop of Wales)
- Bishop of St Davids – John Owen

== Events ==
- 15 January–10 February - The first 1910 United Kingdom general election produces a hung parliament. This is the first election in which all Welsh constituencies have been contested. Of a total of 34 MPs elected in Wales, five are Labour and two Conservative. The 27 Liberal MPs include David Alfred Thomas for Cardiff (replacing Ivor Guest, Baron Ashby St Ledgers, who had been raised to the peerage). Conservatives include William Ormsby-Gore, later Baron Harlech. Unsuccessful candidates include Vernon Hartshorn and Sir George Fossett Roberts. J.H. "Jimmy" Thomas becomes MP for Derby.
- 6 May - George, Prince of Wales, becomes King George V of the United Kingdom, upon the death of his father King Edward VII.
- 2 June - Charles Rolls makes the first non-stop double crossing of the English Channel by air, flying from England to France and back again in just over nine hours.
- 13 June - Captain Robert Falcon Scott and his officers enjoy a farewell dinner at the Royal Hotel in St Mary's Street, Cardiff, before beginning their attempt to be the first men to reach the South Pole.
- 15 June - Captain Robert Falcon Scott sets off on his fatal voyage to Antarctica on the ship Terra Nova, sailing from Cardiff.
- 23 June - Edward, eldest son of George V and Queen Mary, is officially created Prince of Wales, aged 16.
- 12 July - At the Bournemouth International Aviation Meeting, Charles Rolls becomes the first Briton to be killed in an air crash.
- 1 September
  - A lockout begins at Ely Pit in Penygraig, starting a chain of events leading to the Tonypandy riots.
  - Ninian Park football stadium is opened in Cardiff to serve Cardiff City F.C.
- 11 September - English-born actor-aviator Robert Loraine makes an aeroplane flight from Wales across the Irish Sea, landing some 200 feet (60 metres) short of the Irish coast in Dublin Bay.
- 30 September - The King Edward VII National Memorial Association begins its campaign to eradicate tuberculosis in Wales.
- 13 October - Three crew members from the St David's life-boat drown in Ramsey Sound near Ramsey Island.
- 1 November - Coal miners are balloted for strike action by the South Wales Miners' Federation, resulting in 12,000 men working for the Cambrian Combine beginning a 10-month strike.
- 4 November - Ernest Thompson Willows makes the first flight from England to France in his dirigible, City of Cardiff, having earlier in the year made the first flight across the Bristol Channel by airship, from Cardiff to Minehead.
- 8 November - Tonypandy riots: Striking coal miners battle with police and damage shops in Tonypandy.
- 9 November - Soldiers and police battle with striking coal miners at Porth in the Rhondda, with over 500 injuries.
- 3–19 December - The second 1910 United Kingdom general election results in a Liberal government. Wales elects 26 Liberal, five Labour, and three Conservative MPs. Lord Ninian Edward Crichton-Stuart takes Cardiff for the Conservatives and John Hugh Edwards becomes Liberal MP for Mid Glamorgan.
- 18 December - A storm causes substantial damage to the promenade at Aberystwyth.
- date unknown
  - Reconstruction of an abbey on Caldey Island is begun by Anglican Benedictines.
  - Powell Duffryn Steam Coal Company begins sinking Britannia Colliery, Pengam, Monmouthshire, the UK's first to be sunk and worked by electricity.
  - Harry Grindell-Matthews invents the “aerophone”.
  - The Royal Commission on the Church of England and Other Religious Bodies in Wales and Monmouthshire, appointed in 1906, presents its report.
  - The first Girl Guides company in Wales is formed at Carmarthen.
  - Ellis Ellis-Griffith becomes a King's Counsel.
  - The Davies Bryan Company opens a large drapery store in Cairo, designed by Robert Williams.
  - Aneurin Bevan leaves school, aged thirteen.

== Arts and literature ==
- Arthur Machen joins the staff of the Evening News (London).

=== Awards ===
- National Eisteddfod of Wales - held in Colwyn Bay
  - Chair - R. Williams Parry, "Yr Haf"
  - Crown - William Crwys Williams

=== New books ===
==== English language ====
- Sabine Baring-Gould – Lives of the British Saints
- Stanley Bligh – The Direction of Desire
- John Gwenogvryn Evans – Facsimile and Text of the Book of Taliesin
- Bertrand Russell – Philosophical Essays

==== Welsh language ====
- Sir Joseph Alfred Bradney – Llyfr Baglan
- David Richard Jones – Yr Ymchwil am y Goleuni

=== Music ===
- Thomas Carrington - Hen weddi deuluaidd fy nhad
- Robert Donnely and Will Geddes - "Dream of a Miner's Child" ("Don't go down in the mine, Dad")
- J. Lloyd Williams - Aelwyd Angharad

== Sport ==
- Boxing
  - The Welsh Amateur Boxing Association is formed.
  - 20 December - Freddie Welsh beats Jim Driscoll in a controversial fight for the EBU Lightweight title; Driscoll is disqualified for butting.
- Golf
  - Abergele Golf Club first formed.
- Rugby league
  - Treherbert RLFC fold after only their second season.
  - The second and final Welsh League competition is won by Ebbw Vale.
- Rugby union
  - 5 February - Wales beat Scotland 14–0 at the National Stadium, Cardiff.

== Births ==
- 26 January – Frank Williams, Wales international rugby player (d. 1959)
- 9 March – Sir Rhys Llewellyn, 2nd Baronet, mining executive (d. 1978)
- 11 March – Don Tarr, Wales international rugby player
- 5 April – John St. Bodfan Gruffydd, landscape architect (d. 2004)
- 13 April – Michael Brain, cricketer (d. 1971)
- 21 April - Len Attley, Welsh footballer (d. 1979)
- 13 May – Gomer Hughes, dual-code rugby player (d. 1974)
- 21 May – Hywel Lewis, theologian and philosopher (d. 1992)
- 9 June – Ifor Davies, politician (d. 1982)
- 16 June – Annie "Nan" Davies, radio and television producer (d. 1970)
- 18 June – John Menlove Edwards, climber (d. 1958)
- 16 July – Käte Bosse-Griffiths, writer (d. 1998)
- 25 July – Idwal Rees, Wales rugby union captain (d. 1991)
- 2 September – Norman Fender, Wales dual-code rugby international (d. 1983)
- 9 September – Pat Glover, footballer (d. 1971)
- 22 September – Emrys Roberts, politician (d. 1990)
- 11 October – Idris Hopkins, footballer (d. 1994)
- 20 October – Eryl Stephen Thomas, bishop (died 2001)
- 14 November – Errie Ball, Welsh-American golfer (died 2014)
- 24 November – Walter Robbins, international footballer (d. 1979)
- 14 December – Sir Cennydd Traherne, landowner (d. 1995)
- 31 December – Tommy Weale, footballer (d. 1971)

== Deaths ==
- 27 January - John Cory, philanthropist, coal-owner and shipping magnate, 81
- 1 March - David Evans, Archdeacon of St Asaph
- 7 March - Bob Thomas, Wales international rugby player
- 8 March - David Gwynn, Wales international rugby player, 48
- 21 March - Sir Edmund Buckley, 1st Baronet, landowner, 75
- 25 April - Ann Harriet Hughes (Gwyneth Vaughan), novelist, 57/8
- 6 May - Edward VII, Prince of Wales 1841–1901, 68
- 10 May - Anna Laetitia Waring, poet and hymn-writer, 87
- 12 July - Charles Stewart Rolls, aviator and co-founder of Rolls-Royce, 32
- 26 July - Henry Williams politician in Australia, about 68
- 24 November - Thomas Lloyd Williams, Welsh-American writer, 79
- 15 December - John Hugh Jones, Roman Catholic priest, translator and tutor, 67

== See also ==
- 1910 in Ireland
