= 1857 Carmarthenshire by-election =

UK parliamentary by-election

The 1857 Carmarthenshire by-election was fought in June 1857. The by-election arose because of the death of the incumbent Conservative MP, David Arthur Saunders Davies. It was won by the Conservative candidate David Pugh, who prevailed against the opposition of many within the party.

== Candidates ==
John Lloyd Davies, who had stood down as member for Cardigan Boroughs at the recent election, having faced certain defeat when opposed by Edward Pryse, was first in the field. He issued an address within days of the late member's death and emphasised his role in the public life of the county for thirty years. However, it was soon rumoured that David Pugh had the support of a large proportion of the county gentry.

On 3 June, Charles Bishop convened a meeting at the Ivy Bush Hotel in Carmarthen to choose a candidate. The meeting was chaired by Sir John Mansel and addressed by two of the aspirants, John Lloyd Davies and Sir James Hamilton. David Pugh was not present and it was unclear whether he would abide by the decision of the meeting. Howel Gwyn, former MP for Falmouth, was also mentioned but had little support. A lengthy discussion ensued, which ended with Pugh being omitted from a ballot in which John Lloyd Davies secured a majority over Sir James Hamilton.

This was the county that he would have been heavily defeated at a contested election. Pugh's selection was described by the Welshman as a reflection of a consensus which enabled moderate supporters of both the Liberal and Conservative factions to support him.

== Outcome ==
Pugh was duly returned after the hustings at Llandeilo on 12 June, when he was proposed by W.R.H. Powell of Maesgwynne. The Welshman stated that Pugh "was chosen, not by any party, but by the constituents as a body, without any reference to political distinctions."
