= West Carmarthenshire =

UK Parliament constituency (1885–1918)

- Former county constituency for the House of Commons
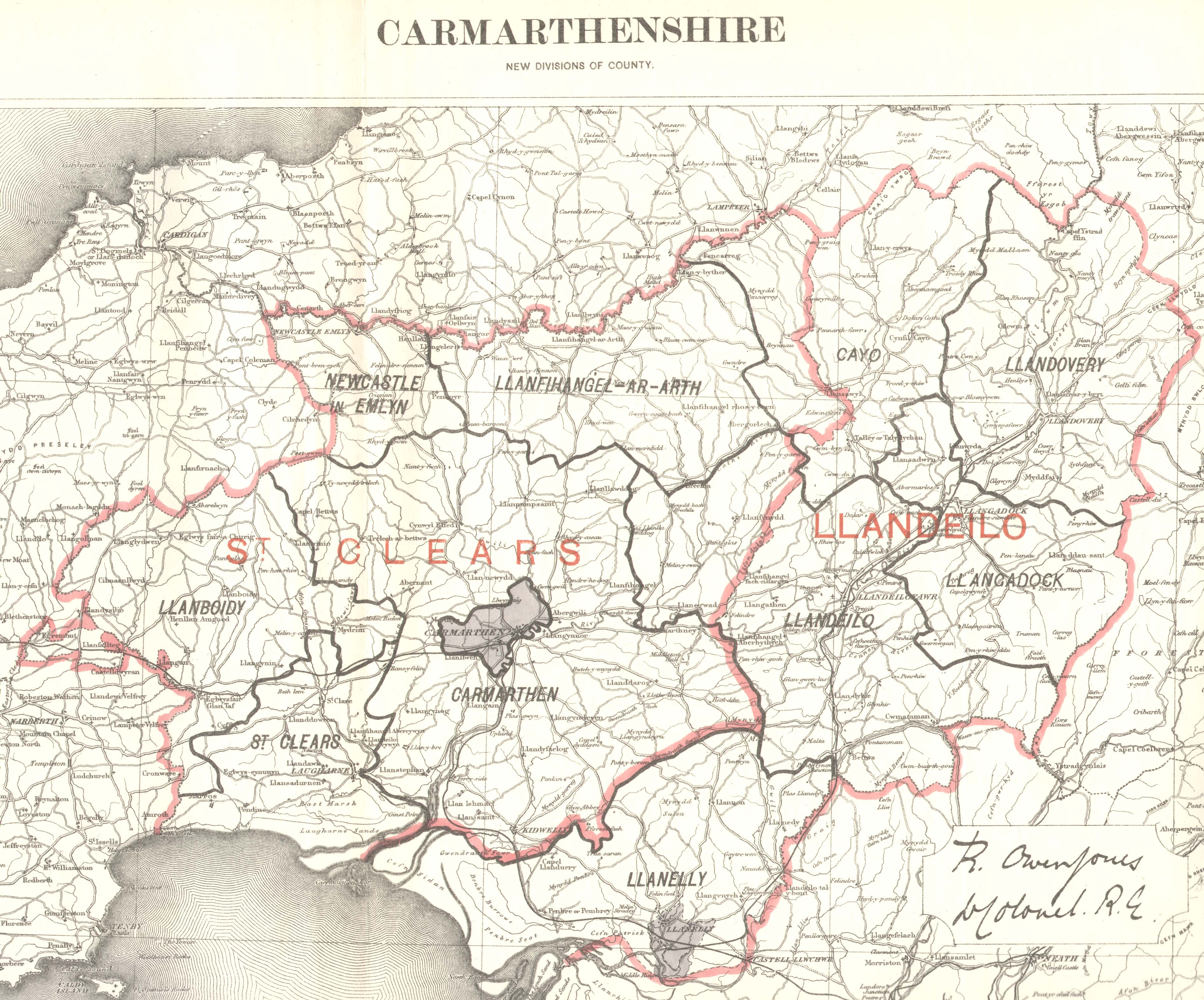
- Carmarthenshire boundaries

1885–1918
- Seats: one
- Created from: Carmarthenshire
- Replaced by: Carmarthen

West Carmarthenshire was a parliamentary constituency in Wales which returned one Member of Parliament (MP) to the House of Commons of the Parliament of the United Kingdom.

It was created for the 1885 general election, when the old two-member Carmarthenshire constituency was divided into two new single-member seats: East Carmarthenshire and West Carmarthenshire, both of which were in turn abolished for the 1918 general election.

== Boundaries ==
The constituency included the Sessional Divisions of Carmarthen, Llanboidy, Llanfihangel-ar-Arth, Newcastle Emlyn, and St Clears, and parts of the Sessional Divisions of Llandilo and Llandovery. It was an almost exclusively rural and agricultural constituency, with the only significant industry being the tinplate works at Kidwelly in the extreme south of the constituency and the woollen mills around Newcastle Emlyn.

== Members of Parliament ==
Election	Member	Party
1885	W. R. H. Powell	Liberal
1889 by-election	John Lloyd Morgan	Liberal
Dec 1910	John Hinds	Liberal
1916	John Hinds	Coalition Liberal
1918	Constituency abolished	

== History ==
=== 1885-88 ===
At the first election in 1885, the two sitting members for the former constituency of Carmarthenshire faced each other. The Conservative candidate, Viscount Emlyn, although most of his family property lay in the eastern part of the county, calculated that his chances there would be negligible given the growing industrial population which had been a key factor in the triumph of the Liberal candidate, Edward Sartoris at the 1868 general election. He was opposed by the Liberal W.R.H. Powell, himself a former Conservative supporter who had first declared his support for the Liberals at the 1874 election. Powell now proclaimed that he had a duty to the Liberal cause to oppose Emlyn.

It was reported that the Conservatives were confident of their chances in the new West Carmarthenshire constituency, on the grounds that it was largely an agricultural division. However, the electorate had more than doubled in the county, and the 1885 electorate in the Western Division alone exceeded that of the combined county seat in 1880. However, the overwhelmingly nonconformist character of the constituency was regarded as a distinct advantage to the Liberal candidate, and the influence of the chapels predicted to be decisive in view of their direct influence over rural agricultural communities.

After a vigorous contest, Powell won a decisive victory.

By the next election the following year, Emlyn had retired from the fray, and Powell increased his majority significantly.

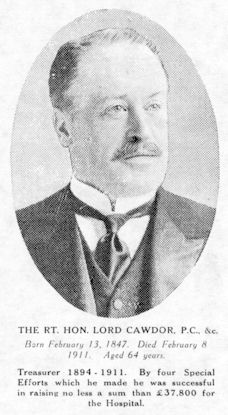
Emlyn

General election 1885: West Carmarthenshire
Party	Candidate	Votes	%
Liberal	W. R. H. Powell	4,568	60.8
Conservative	Viscount Emlyn	2,942	39.2
Majority		1,626	21.6
Turnout		7,510	75.3
Registered electors		9,969	
Liberal win (new seat)			

General election 1886: West Carmarthenshire
Party	Candidate	Votes	%	±%
Liberal	W. R. H. Powell	4,181	68.6	+7.8
Liberal Unionist	James Lawrence	1,916	31.4	−7.8
Majority		2,265	37.2	+15.6
Turnout		6,097	61.2	−14.1
Registered electors		9,969		
Liberal hold		Swing	+7.8	

=== 1889 by-election ===
Powell died in 1889. After a short campaign he was succeeded by John Lloyd Morgan who comfortably won the by-election.

Morgan

1889 West Carmarthenshire by-election
Party	Candidate	Votes	%	±%
Liberal	John Lloyd Morgan	4,252	62.7	−5.9
Conservative	Hugh Williams-Drummond	2,533	37.3	+5.9
Majority		1,719	25.4	−11.8
Turnout		6,785	72.3	+11.1
Registered electors		9,379		
Liberal hold		Swing	-5.9	

=== 1890-1910 ===
Morgan was returned unopposed in 1890. In 1895, however, the Conservatives had their best result in the history the constituency, and their candidate, W.J. Buckley of Llanelli, fought a vigorous campaign supported by local landowners. He was still, however, some distance short of victory.

Lloyd Morgan was opposed for the first time for fifteen years at the first General Election of 1910. His opponent, a Welsh-speaking barrister from Manchester, fought a vigorous campaign but made little impression. Later that year it was announced that Morgan was being made a judge and would not contest the second General Election.

General election 1892: West Carmarthenshire
Party	Candidate	Votes	%	±%
Liberal	John Lloyd Morgan	Unopposed		
Liberal hold				

General election 1895: West Carmarthenshire
Party	Candidate	Votes	%	±%
Liberal	John Lloyd Morgan	4,143	57.2	N/A
Liberal Unionist	William Joseph Buckley	3,103	42.8	New
Majority		1,040	14.4	N/A
Turnout		7,246	79.7	N/A
Registered electors		9,097		
Liberal hold		Swing	N/A	

General election 1900: West Carmarthenshire
Party	Candidate	Votes	%	±%
Liberal	John Lloyd Morgan	Unopposed		
Liberal hold				

General election 1906: West Carmarthenshire
Party	Candidate	Votes	%	±%
Liberal	John Lloyd Morgan	Unopposed		
Liberal hold				

1908 West Carmarthenshire by-election
Party	Candidate	Votes	%	±%
Liberal	John Lloyd Morgan	Unopposed		
Liberal hold				

General election January 1910: West Carmarthenshire
Party	Candidate	Votes	%	±%
Liberal	John Lloyd Morgan	5,684	73.4	N/A
Conservative	John William Jones Cremlin	2,059	26.6	New
Majority		3,625	46.8	N/A
Turnout		7,743	82.1	N/A
Liberal hold		Swing	N/A	

=== The second 1910 general election ===
Six candidates contested the nomination, including Sir Owen Philipps, who had latterly stood down as member for Pembroke Boroughs, and Courtenay Mansel. The final choice was between John Hinds, a native of Carmarthen who was now a successful businessman in London and Henry Jones-Davies, who was both a prominent member of Carmarthenshire County Council and brother-in-law of the late Liberal politician, Tom Ellis. Jones-Davies had led throughout the candidate selection process but Hinds won the final ballot by 188 votes against 186.

At the election that followed, Hinds was opposed by Jones Cremlyn, who was once again the Conservative candidate. It was suggested at one stage that the Rev Arthur Fuller Mills of Carmarthen, chairman of Carmarthenshire County Council, would contest the seat as an independent but the rumour proved unfounded. Jones Cremlyn fought vigorous campaign, which was enthusiastically supported by the Carmarthen Journal and addressed meetings throughout the constituency, travelling from village to village by motor car.

Following the election, a Carmarthen Journal editorial complained about the dominance of the Liberals in the constituency and the means by which nonconformist ministers sustained them.

Hinds

General election December 1910: West Carmarthenshire
Party	Candidate	Votes	%	±%
Liberal	John Hinds	5,076	71.4	−2.0
Conservative	John William Jones Cremlin	2,036	28.6	+2.0
Majority		3,040	42.8	−4.0
Turnout		7,112	75.4	−6.7
Liberal hold		Swing	-2.0	

Another General Election was required to take place before the end of 1915. The political parties had been making preparations for an election to take place and by July 1914, Alfred Stephens of Kidwelly had been chosen to oppose John Hinds.
