= Peter Urban Sartoris =

Swiss banker

Peter Urbanus Sartoris (French: Pierre-Urbain Sartoris; c. 1767–1833) was a British banker of Genevan origin who had offices in London and Sceaux, Hauts-de-Seine.

== Biography ==
Born around 1767 in Geneva, Republic of Geneva, the son of a Huguenot banker, Jean-Jacques Sartoris, and Anne Greffuhle (aunt of Jean-Henry-Louis Greffulhe), he was baptised on 5 August 1773. He used to live in Gloucester Place close to Regent's Park, and married in 1813 Hester Matilda Tunno, daughter of the Scottish banker John Tunno (1746–1819) and sister of Edward Rose Tunno. They had six children including a son, the British statesman Edward John Sartoris, and a daughter who later married Louis Victor Arthur des Acres de l'Aigle.

Sartoris' Naturalization Act 1809
- Act of Parliament
- Parliament of the United Kingdom
- Long title: An Act for naturalizing Peter Urbanis Sartoris.
- Citation: 49 Geo. 3. c. 9 Pr.

Dates
- Royal assent: 24 March 1809

In January 1809 he was naturalised as a British subject by a private act of Parliament, Sartoris' Naturalization Act 1809 (49 Geo. 3. c. 9 Pr.).

Shortly after 1818, he acted as first consul of the Swiss Confederacy in the United Kingdom, then was succeeded by Alexandre Prévost Prévost wrote of him : 'He [Urbain Sartoris] had both good fortune and ambition, or rather self-pride. Thanks to his diplomatic charge, he thought he could fling open the gates of high society for himself; yet no sooner had he passed the line he had been craving for, did he stop caring for a second-order office, which he openly declared to me, offering me to be introduced as his successor'.

During the French Restoration, Sartoris moved to France and invested millions of francs in inland waterways. He bought a manor house at Sceaux. He also bought the estates of la Garenne de Colombes, which his inheritors sold by pieces around 1865.

He died in Paris on 30 November 1833.

== Family ==
Peter and Hester Sartoris had six children:

- Jean-Édouard Sartoris (1814–1888)
- Henriette-Élisa Sartoris, (1815–1896)
- Frédéric-Urbain Sartoris (1820–1887), High Sheriff of Northamptonshire in 1855
- Charles-Urbain Sartoris, (1825–1884)
- Alfred Urbain Sartoris (1826–1909)
- Jules-Alexandre Sartoris (1831–1863)
