= 1889 West Carmarthenshire by-election =

UK Parliamentary by-election in Wales

The 1889 West Carmarthenshire by-election was a parliamentary by-election held for the British House of Commons constituency of West Carmarthenshire in Wales on 17 July 1889. The by-election was caused by the death of the sitting Liberal MP, W. R. H. Powell.

== Candidates ==
The Liberals had won the seat comfortably in 1885, with Powell heavily defeating the former Conservative member for Carmarthenshire, Viscount Emlyn. The party moved quickly to choose a new candidate and there was a strong feeling that the new candidate should be a nonconformist. Their choice fell upon John Lloyd Morgan, son of William Morgan, former principal of the Presbyterian College at Carmarthen, who was chosen unanimously following a selection conference at Carmarthen.

There was no certainty that the Conservatives would contest the seat, and an editorial in the Liberal-inclined Carmarthen newspaper, the Welshman, expressed the view that unless the former member, Lord Emlyn, could be induced to come forward, the party's prospects were poor. Emlyn declined, and the Conservative choice, fell upon Hugh Williams-Drummond, a member of another prominent Carmarthenshire family.

Thus, within a couple of weeks, both the Liberal and Conservative parties had chosen candidates who were of a similar age and who were both fighting their first parliamentary campaign. John Lloyd Morgan, the Liberal candidate, was thought to have an advantage over his Conservative opponent, Hugh Williams-Drummond, in that he was known to the electorate, having spoken for the former member at the previous election.

== Result ==
1889 West Carmarthenshire by-election
Party	Candidate	Votes	%	±%
Liberal	John Lloyd Morgan	4,252	62.7	−5.9
Conservative	Hugh Henry John Williams-Drummond	2,533	37.3	+5.9
Majority		1,719	25.4	−11.8
Turnout		6,785	72.3	+11.1
Registered electors		9,379		
Liberal hold		Swing	-5.9	
