= David Arthur Saunders Davies =

Member of Parliament for Carmarthenshire
- In office 27 December 1842 – 22 May 1857 Serving with David Jones (1852–1857); George Rice-Trevor (1842–1852)
- Preceded by: George Rice-Trevor; John Jones
- Succeeded by: David Jones; David Pugh

Personal details
- Born: 9 June 1792
- Died: 22 May 1857 (aged 64) United University Club, London
- Party: Conservative
- Spouse: Elizabeth Maria Philipps (m. 1829)

David Arthur Saunders Davies (9 June 1792 – 22 May 1857) was a British Conservative politician, and barrister.

Saunders Davies was the son of David Davies, a physician, who married Susanna, daughter and heiress of Erasmus Saunders of Pentre. He was educated at Harrow and Oxford. He married Elizabeth Maria, daughter of Colonel Owen Philipps, in 1829. He was admitted to Christ Church, Oxford in 1810, aged 18, and graduated with a Bachelor of Arts in 1814 and a Master of Arts in 1817, before being admitted into Lincoln's Inn in 1818.

Davies was elected MP for Carmarthenshire at a by-election in 1842—caused by the death of John Jones of Ystrad—and held the seat until his death in 1857.

Also a chairman of the Cardiganshire quarter sessions and a Justice of the Peace, Davies died at the United University gentlemen's club in London.

Parliament of the United Kingdom
Preceded by George Rice-Trevor; John Jones	Member of Parliament for Carmarthenshire; 1842–1857; With: David Jones (1852–1857); George Rice-Trevor (1842–1852)	Succeeded by David Jones; David Pugh
