= 1908 West Carmarthenshire by-election =

UK Parliamentary by-election in Wales

The 1908 West Carmarthenshire by-election was a parliamentary by-election held for the British House of Commons constituency of West Carmarthenshire in West Wales on 26 February 1908.

== Vacancy ==
Under the provisions of the Succession to the Crown Act 1707 and a number of subsequent Acts, MPs appointed to certain ministerial and legal offices were at this time required to seek re-election. The West Carmarthenshire by-election was caused by the appointment of the sitting Liberal MP, John Lloyd Morgan as Recorder of Swansea.

== Candidates ==
Morgan, who had held the seat since 1889, having been unopposed at the general elections of 1900 and 1906 fought the seat again but, again, there were no nominations against him and he was therefore returned unopposed.

== Result ==
1908 West Carmarthenshire by-election
Party	Candidate	Votes	%	±%
Liberal	John Lloyd Morgan	Unopposed		
Registered electors				
Liberal hold				

== See also ==
- Lists of United Kingdom by-elections
- United Kingdom by-election records
