= Merrick Denton-Thompson =

Merrick Denton-Thompson OBE FLI PPLI is a British landscape architect and environmentalist. He served as President of the Landscape Institute from 2016 to 2018 and has held senior roles in local government, Natural England, and a range of environmental charities and trusts.

== Career ==
Merrick has worked across local government, the voluntary sector, and national agencies with a focus on environment, landscape, rural affairs, and strategic planning.

He was the City Landscape Architect of Portsmouth City Council before moving to Hampshire County Council, where he became County Landscape Architect, Head of Countryside, and later Assistant Director of Environment. From 2006 to 2009, he served as a board member of Natural England and directed the Rural Pathfinder for the South East of England in 2006. He has also acted as a facilitator for the Department for Environment, Food and Rural Affairs (DEFRA) between 2021 and 2024.

He is the founding trustee of the Learning Through Landscapes Trust. Sir David Attenborough is a patron. He has served as Chairman of the Cholderton Estate Trust and is also a trustee of the Downforce Trust and has been actively involved in DEFRA’s Environmental Land Management (ELM) Test and Trials programme.

Denton-Thompson was appointed Officer of the Order of the British Empire (OBE) for services to education. In 2018, he was awarded an honorary Doctorate of Philosophy by the University of Gloucestershire.
