= John Jones (Carmarthenshire MP) =

Welsh banker and politician (1812–1886)

Member of Parliament for Carmarthenshire
- In office 27 November 1868 – 31 March 1880 Serving with Edward Sartoris (1868–1874); Viscount Emlyn (1874–1880)
- Preceded by: David Jones; David Pugh
- Succeeded by: Viscount Emlyn; Walter Powell

Personal details
- Born: 1812 Llwynberllan, Carmarthenshire, Wales
- Died: 28 February 1886 (aged 73–74) Llandovery, Carmarthenshire, Wales
- Party: Conservative
- Spouse: Anne Thomas (m. 1842–1886)

John Jones (1812 – 28 February 1886) was a Welsh banker and Conservative Party politician.

== Early life ==
Born near Llandovery, Carmarthenshire, he was the third son of John and Mary Jones. He was called to the bar at the Middle Temple, but never practised as a barrister. He married Anne Thomas, daughter of Major David Thomas of Wellfield House, Radnorshire in 1842. He lived at the family estate of Blaenôs, Llandovery and had a townhouse in St James's, London. He held the office of High Sheriff of Carmarthenshire in 1854 and was a justice of the peace and deputy lieutenant for Carmarthenshire.

== Banking ==
His grandfather, David Jones, had established a bank in Llandovery in 1799, and on his death in 1839 the business passed to John and his elder brothers David and William. The brothers expanded the bank as David Jones & Company.

== Member of parliament ==
In 1868, John's elder brother David Jones, one of two members of parliament for the County of Carmarthenshire, announced that he was retiring due to ill-health. John was chosen to defend the seat for the Conservative Party. He was elected at the 1868 general election and held the seat unopposed until 1880. At the general election of that year he was defeated by a Liberal party candidate, Walter Powell.

== Death ==
Towards the end of his life, Jones was said to have aged suddenly, although he continued to walk back and forth on a daily basis to the town of Llandovery, around a mile and a half from his home. He had done so on the day of his death but, shortly after his return, he died suddenly having collapsed in a field while watching some men ploughing. His death was attributed to heart disease.

Parliament of the United Kingdom
Preceded by David Jones; David Pugh	Member of Parliament for Carmarthenshire; 1868–1880; With: Edward John Sartoris (1868–1874); Viscount Emlyn (1874–1880)	Succeeded by Viscount Emlyn; W. R. H. Powell
