= Sir James Hamlyn-Williams, 3rd Baronet =

Welsh politician

Sir James Hamlyn Williams, 3rd Baronet (25 November 1790 – 10 October 1861) was a Welsh politician.

Hamlyn Williams was educated at Winchester College. He had houses at Edwinsford in Carmarthenshire, and Clovelly Court in Devon. He served as a major in the 7th Queen's Own Hussars in the Peninsular War. At the 1831 UK general election, he followed his father and grandfather in standing in Carmarthenshire. He won the seat as a Whig, but lost it at the 1832 UK general election. He regained it in 1835, but lost it again at the 1837 UK general election. In Parliament, he called for the immediate abolition of slavery, and for the removal of taxes on various staple goods.

In later life, Hamlyn Williams focused his time on hunting, becoming honorary gamekeeper for Caio, Mallaine and Talley, and also became the Sheriff of Carmarthenshire.

== Descendants ==
Arms of Frederick Hamlyn

He married Lady Mary Fortescue, daughter of Hugh Fortescue, 1st Earl Fortescue.

- Susan married Henry Hamlyn Fane.
- Mary Eleanor married Sir James Williams-Drummond, 3rd Baronet(1814–1866).
- Edwina Augusta married Sir John Ferguson Davie, 2nd baronet.

With only daughters, the title became extinct upon his death. However, his granddaughter through his elderest daughter (Susan Hamlyn-Fane) married Frederick Gosling, who changed his name by Royal Licence to Hamlyn.

Parliament of the United Kingdom
| Preceded by George Rice-Trevor | Member of Parliament for Carmarthenshire; 1831–1832 | Succeeded by George Rice-Trevor; Edward Hamlyn Adams |
| Preceded by George Rice-Trevor; Edward Hamlyn Adams | Member of Parliament for Carmarthenshire; 1835–1837 | Succeeded by George Rice-Trevor; John Jones of Ystrad |
Baronetage of England
| Preceded by Sir James Hamlyn-Williams | Baronet (of Clovelly); 1829–1861 | Extinct |
