= Carmarthenshire (UK Parliament constituency) =

UK Parliament constituency (1832–1885)

- Former county constituency for the House of Commons

1542–1885
- Seats: one until 1832, then two
- Replaced by: East Carmarthenshire and West Carmarthenshire

Carmarthenshire was a parliamentary constituency in Wales which returned one Member of Parliament (MP) to the House of Commons of the Parliament of the United Kingdom until its representation was increased to two members for the 1832 general election.

At the 1885 general election, it was divided into two new single-member seats: East Carmarthenshire and West Carmarthenshire.

== History ==
For most of its history, the Carmarthenshire constituency was dominated by a small number of powerful families. Chief among these were the Rice family of Dynevor, who could claim descent from the medieval Lord Rhys of Deheubarth. They drew upon traditional loyalty and the connotations linked to the Dynevor name to maintain their status as the leading political family of the county and leaders of the Red or Tory faction.

In 1790 the influence of the Dynevor family was re-asserted when George Talbot Rice was elected unopposed. Four years later, he was elevated to the House of Lords and the family would not be in a position to represent the county again until 1820 when his yet unborn son would have came of age.

A celebrated contest took place in 1802 between James Hamlyn Williams and William Paxton. The contest was said to have cost Paxton a total of £15,000. This included 11,070 breakfasts, 36,901 dinners, 25,275 gallons of ale, 11,068 bottles of spirits, 8,879 bottles of porter, 460 of sherry, 509 of cider and gallons of milk punch. The contest became known as ‘Lecsiwn Fawr’ (the Great Election). Paxton was defeated and spent two years settling his debts.

In 1820, George Rice Trevor was elected MP for Carmarthenshire and held the seat until 1831, when he stood down over his opposition to reform.

=== Reformed elections ===
Following the Reform Act 1832, the county was awarded a second seat. In 1832, Rice Trevor resumed his parliamentary career and served until 1852 when he was elevated to the House of Lords upon inheriting the title of Lord Dynevor. He was succeeded by David Jones of Pantglas, who served until 1868.

The second seat was held by supporters of the Whig party until John Jones of Ystrad unseated James Hamlyn-Williams in 1837. Jones was succeeded by another Tory, D.A. Saunders Davies who served until his death in 1857. At this point, however, the seat was occupied by David Pugh, who was regarded as a Liberal-Conservative, and who in later life migrated to the Liberal Party.

At the 1868 general election, following a lengthy and lively campaign characterized by accusations of coercion, Edward Sartoris captured a seat for the Liberals. He was defeated in 1874 but in 1880 the Liberals again captured a seat. Following the Third Reform Act the constituency was divided into two single-member seats.

== Members of Parliament ==
=== MPs 1542–1640 ===
Parliament	member
1542–1545	Unknown (returns lost)
1545	Hon. Richard Devereux. Died on day of re-election in October 1547
1548	Sir John Perrott
1553	Henry Jones
1555	Richard Jones
1558	Sir Thomas Jones (of Haroldston)
1559	Richard Jones
1563	Sir Henry Jones
1572	John Vaughan died and replaced 1576 by Walter Vaughan
1584	Walter Rice
1586	Sir Thomas Jones
1588	Herbert Croft
1593	Walter Vaughan
1597	Sir Thomas Jones
1601	John Vaughan
1604	Sir Robert Mansell|-
1620	Sir John Vaughan
1624	Richard Vaughan
1629–1640	No Parliament summoned

=== MPs during the Wars of the Three Kingdoms (1640–1653) ===
Year	Member	Party
April 1640	Henry Vaughan	Royalist
February 1644	Vaughan disabled from sitting – seat vacant	
1646	John Lloyd	Royalist
December 1648	Lloyd excluded in Pride's Purge – seat vacant	
1653	Carmarthenshire was not represented in the Barebones Parliament	

=== MPs during the Protectorate (1653–1659) ===
Year	First Member	Second Member
Representation increased to two members in First Protectorate Parliament
1654	John Claypole	Rowland Dawkins
1656	John Claypole,sat for Northants.	Rowland Dawkins
1656	Robert Atkyns	Rowland Dawkins
Representation reverted to one member from January 1659

=== MPs 1659-1832 ===
Year	Member	Party
January 1659	Thomas Hughes	
May 1659	Carmarthenshire was not represented in the restored Rump	
April 1660	John Lloyd	
1661	Francis Vaughan (died 1668)	
1668	Sir Henry Vaughan (died 1676)	
1677	Altham Vaughan	
1679	John Vaughan	
1685	John Vaughan	
1689	Sir Rice Rudd	
1701	Griffith Rice	Whig
1710	Sir Thomas Powell	Tory
1715	Charles Powlett	Whig
1717	Sir Thomas Stepney	
1722	Edward Rice	
1724	Sir Nicholas Williams	
1745	John Vaughan I	
1754	George Rice	
1779	John Vaughan II	
1784	Sir William Mansel	
1790	Hon. George Rice	Tory
1793	Sir James Hamlyn	
1802	James Hamlyn-Williams	
1806	Sir William Paxton	Whig
1807	Lord Robert Seymour	Tory
1820	Hon. George Rice-Trevor	Tory
1831	Sir James Hamlyn-Williams	Whig
1832	Representation increased to two members by the Reform Act 1832	

=== MPs 1832–1885 ===
Election	First member	First Party	Second member	Second Party
1832	Hon. George Rice-Trevor	Conservative	Edward Hamlyn Adams	Whig
1835	Hon. George Rice-Trevor	Conservative	Sir James Hamlyn-Williams	Whig
1837	Hon. George Rice-Trevor	Conservative	John Jones of Ystrad	Conservative
1842 by-election	Hon. George Rice-Trevor	Conservative	David Arthur Saunders Davies	Conservative
1852 by-election	David Jones	Conservative	David Arthur Saunders Davies	Conservative
1857 by-election	David Jones	Conservative	David Pugh	Peelite
1859	David Jones	Conservative	David Pugh	Liberal
1868	Edward John Sartoris	Liberal	John Jones	Conservative
1874	Viscount Emlyn	Conservative	John Jones	Conservative
1880	Viscount Emlyn	Conservative	W. R. H. Powell	Liberal
1885	Constituency abolished: see East Carmarthenshire, West Carmarthenshire			

== Election results ==
=== Elections in the 1830s ===
General election 1830: Carmarthenshire
Party	Candidate	Votes	%
Tory	George Rice-Trevor	Unopposed	
Registered electors		c. 3,000	
Tory hold			

General election 1831: Carmarthenshire
Party	Candidate	Votes	%
Whig	James Hamlyn-Williams	Unopposed	
Registered electors		c. 3,000	
Whig gain from Tory			

General election 1832: Carmarthenshire
Party	Candidate	Votes	%
Tory	George Rice-Trevor	1,853	37.1
Whig	Edward Hamlyn Adams	1,638	32.8
Whig	James Hamlyn-Williams	1,504	30.1
Turnout		3,502	90.1
Registered electors		3,887	
Majority		215	4.3
Tory win (new seat)			
Majority		134	2.7
Whig hold			

General election 1835: Carmarthenshire
Party	Candidate	Votes	%	±%
Conservative	George Rice-Trevor	2,204	36.8	+18.3
Whig	James Hamlyn-Williams	1,939	32.3	−30.6
Conservative	John Jones	1,851	30.9	+12.4
Turnout		3,685	87.2	−2.9
Registered electors		4,227		
Majority		265	4.5	+0.2
Conservative hold		Swing	+16.8	
Majority		88	1.4	−1.3
Whig hold		Swing	−30.7	

General election 1837: Carmarthenshire
Party	Candidate	Votes	%	±%
Conservative	George Rice-Trevor	2,486	37.0	+0.2
Conservative	John Jones	2,173	32.3	+1.4
Whig	James Hamlyn-Williams	2,068	30.7	−1.6
Majority		105	1.6	−2.9
Turnout		4,315	84.2	−3.0
Registered electors		5,125		
Conservative hold		Swing	+0.5	
Conservative gain from Whig		Swing	+1.1	

=== Elections in the 1840s ===
General election 1841: Carmarthenshire
Party	Candidate	Votes	%	±%
Conservative	John Jones	Unopposed		
Conservative	George Rice-Trevor	Unopposed		
Registered electors		5,614		
Conservative hold				
Conservative hold				

Jones' death caused a by-election.

By-election, 27 December 1842: Carmarthenshire
Party	Candidate	Votes	%	±%
Conservative	David Arthur Saunders Davies	Unopposed		
Conservative hold				

General election 1847: Carmarthenshire
Party	Candidate	Votes	%	±%
Conservative	George Rice-Trevor	Unopposed		
Conservative	David Arthur Saunders Davies	Unopposed		
Registered electors		5,261		
Conservative hold				
Conservative hold				

=== Elections in the 1850s ===
Rice-Trevor succeeded to the peerage, becoming 4th Baron Dynevor and causing a by-election.

By-election, 13 May 1852: Carmarthenshire
Party	Candidate	Votes	%	±%
Conservative	David Jones	Unopposed		
Conservative hold				

General election 1852: Carmarthenshire
Party	Candidate	Votes	%	±%
Conservative	David Jones	Unopposed		
Conservative	David Arthur Saunders Davies	Unopposed		
Registered electors		4,791		
Conservative hold				
Conservative hold				

General election 1857: Carmarthenshire
Party	Candidate	Votes	%	±%
Conservative	David Jones	Unopposed		
Conservative	David Arthur Saunders Davies	Unopposed		
Registered electors		4,272		
Conservative hold				
Conservative hold				

Davies' death caused a by-election.

By-election, 12 June 1857: Carmarthenshire
Party	Candidate	Votes	%	±%
Peelite	David Pugh	Unopposed		
Peelite gain from Conservative				

General election 1859: Carmarthenshire
Party	Candidate	Votes	%	±%
Conservative	David Jones	Unopposed		
Liberal-Conservative	David Pugh	Unopposed		
Registered electors		4,491		
Conservative hold				
Liberal-Conservative gain from Conservative				

=== Elections in the 1860s ===
General election 1865: Carmarthenshire
Party	Candidate	Votes	%	±%
Conservative	David Jones	Unopposed		
Liberal-Conservative	David Pugh	Unopposed		
Registered electors		4,833		
Conservative hold				
Liberal-Conservative hold				

General election 1868: Carmarthenshire
Party	Candidate	Votes	%	±%
Liberal	Edward John Sartoris	3,280	31.6	N/A
Conservative	John Jones	2,942	28.3	N/A
Conservative	Henry Lavallin Puxley	2,828	27.2	N/A
Liberal-Conservative	David Pugh	1,340	12.9	N/A
Turnout		6,165 (est)	76.8 (est)	N/A
Registered electors		8,026		
Majority		1,940	18.7	N/A
Liberal gain from Liberal-Conservative		Swing	N/A	
Majority		1,602	15.4	N/A
Conservative hold		Swing	N/A	

=== Elections in the 1870s ===
General election 1874: Carmarthenshire
Party	Candidate	Votes	%	±%
Conservative	Frederick Campbell	3,389	28.8	+1.6
Conservative	John Jones	3,261	27.7	−0.6
Liberal	W. R. H. Powell	2,799	23.8	+10.9
Liberal	Edward John Sartoris	2,331	19.8	−11.8
Majority		462	3.9	−11.5
Turnout		5,890 (est)	72.2 (est)	−4.6
Registered electors		8,161		
Conservative gain from Liberal		Swing	+6.7	
Conservative hold		Swing	−5.8	

=== Elections in the 1880s ===
General election 1880: Carmarthenshire (2 seats)
Party	Candidate	Votes	%	±%
Liberal	W. R. H. Powell	4,101	41.7	−1.9
Conservative	Frederick Campbell	3,030	30.8	+2.0
Conservative	John Jones	2,712	27.6	−0.1
Turnout		7,131 (est)	83.0 (est)	+10.8
Registered electors		8,593		
Majority		1,389	14.1	N/A
Liberal gain from Conservative		Swing	−1.5	
Conservative hold		Swing	N/A	

== Bibliography ==
- Leigh Rayment's Historical List of MPs – Constituencies beginning with "C" (part 3)
- Robert Beatson, A Chronological Register of Both Houses of Parliament (London: Longman, Hurst, Res & Orme, 1807)
- D Brunton & D H Pennington, Members of the Long Parliament (London: George Allen & Unwin, 1954)
- Cobbett's Parliamentary history of England, from the Norman Conquest in 1066 to the year 1803 (London: Thomas Hansard, 1808)
- F W S Craig, British Parliamentary Election Results 1832–1885 (2nd edition, Aldershot: Parliamentary Research Services, 1989)
- Welsh Biography Online
