= George Rice-Trevor, 4th Baron Dynevor =

British politician (1795–1869)

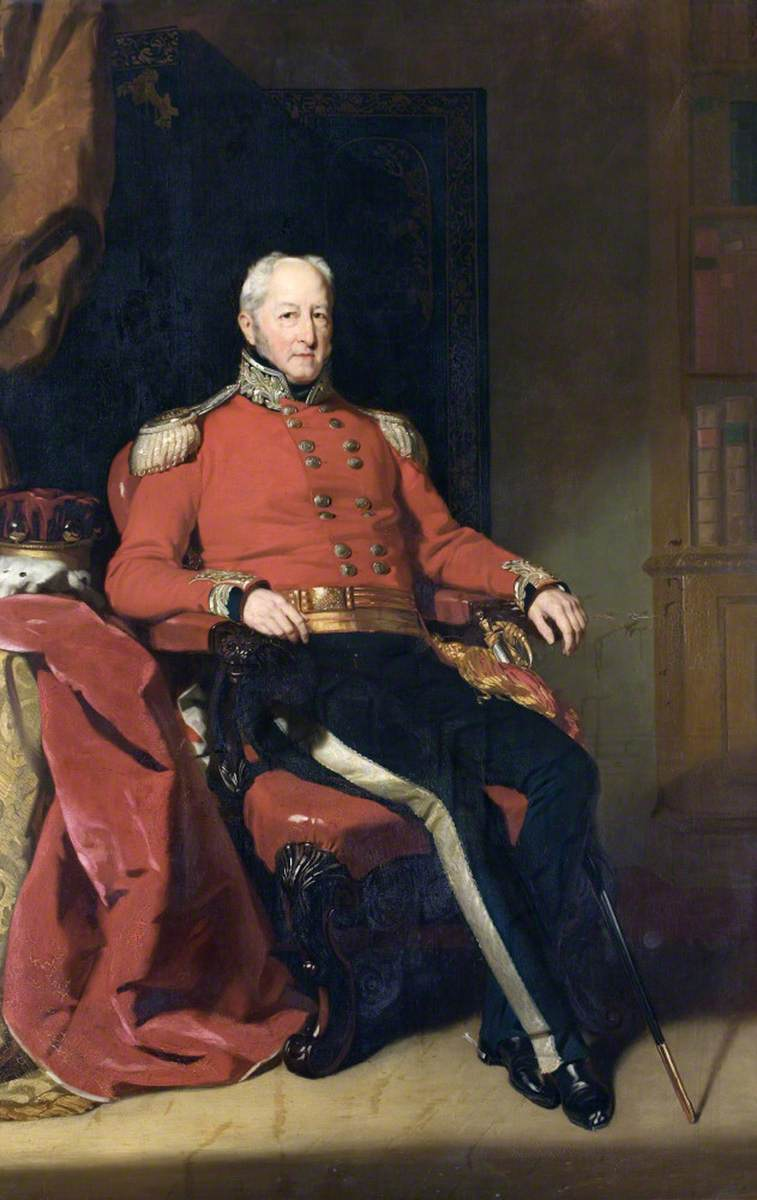
- Portrait by John Lucas

Member of Parliament for Carmarthenshire
- In office 1820–1831
- Preceded by: Lord Robert Seymour
- Succeeded by: Sir James Hamlyn-Williams, Bt.

Member of Parliament for Carmarthenshire
- In office 1832–1852 Serving with: Edward Hamlyn Adams to 1835; Sir James Hamlyn-Williams, Bt. 1835–1837; John Jones 1837–1842; David Davies from 1842
- Preceded by: Sir James Hamlyn-Williams, Bt.
- Succeeded by: David Jones; David Davies

Personal details
- Born: 5 August 1795
- Died: 7 October 1869 (aged 74) Malvern, Worcestershire, England
- Resting place: Barrington Park, Gloucestershire, England
- Party: Conservative
- Parent: George Talbot Rice, 3rd Baron Dynevor (father)

George Rice-Trevor, 4th Baron Dynevor (5 August 1795 – 7 October 1869) was a British politician and peer.

== Early life ==
He was the son of George Talbot Rice, 3rd Baron Dynevor. Dynevor matriculated at Christ Church, Oxford 13 October 1812; he was awarded a D.C.L. on 11 June 1834. By royal licence, 28 October 1824, he took the name of Trevor, after that of Rice, on inheriting the estates of the Trevor family at Bromham, Bedfordshire.

== Political career ==
He served as Tory Member of Parliament (MP) for Carmarthenshire, from 1820 to 1831. At the 1831 United Kingdom general election he chose to stand down from the Commons on the basis that his political views diverged from those of his constituents. The following year, however, he contested the seat and was re-elected, serving until his elevation to the peerage in 1852 upon the death of his father.

== Rebecca Riots ==
When the Rebecca Riots of 1843–44 reached Carmarthenshire Rice-Trevor, as Lieutenant-Colonel Commandant of the Royal Carmarthen Fusiliers Militia, and MP and vice-lieutenant of the county, returned from London to deal with the situation. After the rioters burned crops on his father's Dinefwr estate he threatened armed retaliation. The response of the rioters was to dig a grave in the grounds and announce that Rice-Trevor would occupy it by 10 October 1843. He did not, but he did order in so many troops and police that a barracks had to be built to accommodate them.

== Later life ==
Lord Dynevor succeeded to the title of Baron Dynevor and the Dinefwr estate on the death of his father in 1852. He was an honorary colonel in the militia and from 1852 to 1869 he served as ADC to Queen Victoria.

== Personal life ==
On 27 November 1824 he married Frances Fitzroy, daughter of General Lord Charles Fitzroy (a younger son of Augustus FitzRoy, 3rd Duke of Grafton). The couple had the following children:

- The Hon. Frances Emily Rice (1827– 26 November 1863)
- The Hon. Caroline Elizabeth Anne Rice-Trevor (1829 – 12 August 1887), married Thomas Bateson, 1st Baron Deramore
- The Hon. Selina Rice-Trevor (11 September 1836 – 22 January 1918), married William Pakenham, 4th Earl of Longford
- The Hon. Elianore Mary Rice-Trevor (born 1839)

Dynevor died on 7 October 1869, aged 74, at Malvern, Worcestershire from paralysis and was interred in the family vault at Barrington Park, the family estate in Gloucestershire. As he died without male issue, his cousin the Reverend Francis William Rice succeeded to the barony. The family wealth passed to his daughters, thus splitting the wealth from the title.

Coat of arms of George Rice-Trevor, 4th Baron Dynevor
Crest A raven Sable. Escutcheon Argent a chevron between three ravens Sable. Supporters Dexter a griffin per fess Or and Argent wings addorsed and inverted tail between the legs, sinister a talbot Argent collared flory counterflory Gules ears Ermine and charged on the shoulder with a trefoil slipped Vert. Motto Secret Et Hardi (Secret And Bold))

Parliament of the United Kingdom
Preceded by Lord Robert Seymour	Member of Parliament for Carmarthenshire; 1820–1831	Succeeded by Sir James Hamlyn-Williams, Bt.
Preceded by Sir James Hamlyn-Williams, Bt.	Member of Parliament for Carmarthenshire; 1832 – 1852; With: Edward Hamlyn Adams to 1835; Sir James Hamlyn-Williams, Bt. 1835–1837; John Jones 1837–1842; David Davies from 1842	Succeeded by David Jones; David Davies
Peerage of Great Britain
Preceded by George Talbot Rice	Baron Dynevor; 1852–1869	Succeeded by Francis William Rice
