= John Hinds (politician) =

British politician

Member of Parliament for Carmarthen West Carmarthenshire (1910–1918)
- In office 19 December 1910 – 6 December 1923
- Preceded by: John Lloyd Morgan
- Succeeded by: Ellis Ellis-Griffith

Personal details
- Born: John Hinds; 26 July 1862 Carmarthen, Carmarthenshire, UK
- Died: 23 July 1928 (aged 65) London, England, UK
- Party: Liberal (Before 1916, 1923–1928)
- Other political affiliations: Coalition Liberal (1916–1922); National Liberal (1922–1923)
- Spouse: Lizzie Powell (m. 1893–1928)
- Children: 1
- Parents: William Hinds (father); Mary Jones (mother)

John Hinds (26 July 1862 – 23 July 1928) was a Welsh businessman and politician. At the December 1910 general election Hinds was chosen as the Liberal candidate for the seat of West Carmarthenshire, holding the seat until its abolition in 1918.

== Early life and career ==
Hinds was born at Cwnin Farm near Carmarthen. He was the son of William Hinds and Mary née Jones. He was apprenticed as a draper to his uncle who had a business in Carmarthen Town. In 1887 he moved to Blackheath in the south eastern suburbs of London where he founded the highly successful drapery firm of Hinds and Company. At various times he held the offices of chairman of the Drapers’ Fire Insurance Corporation and president of the Drapers’ Chamber of Trade.

== Political career ==
=== Election to Parliament: the West Carmarthenshire election, 1910 ===
Hinds was an active member of the Liberal Party, at one time holding the presidency of the Blackheath Liberal Association. He began to search for a parliamentary seat in Wales and early in 1910 came close to being selected as Liberal candidate for Merthyr Tydfil. Shortly afterwards he was briefly mentioned as a possible candidate for East Glamorgan.

Later that year, John Lloyd Morgan, the Liberal MP for West Carmarthenshire was made a judge and stood down as candidate for the second General Election of 1910. Hinds now sought the nomination for the constituency. Five other candidates contested the nomination, including Sir Owen Philipps, who was standing down as member for Pembroke Boroughs, and Sir Courtenay Mansel. It was initially suggested that the contest of the nomination would primarily be between Hinds and Philipps. Henry Jones-Davies, who was both a prominent member of Carmarthenshire County Council and brother-in-law of the late Liberal politician, Tom Ellis led at each stage of the voting at a selection conference held at Water Street Chapel, Carmarthen. However, at the final ballot, Hinds won by 188 votes against 186.

At the election that followed, Hinds was opposed by J.W. Jones Cremlyn, who had contested the previous election. It was initially suggested that the Rev Arthur Fuller Mills, chairman of Carmarthenshire County Council, would contest the seat as an independent but the rumour proved unfounded.

Once he had been selected as candidate, Hinds was virtually assured of election to Parliament, even though there were initial concerns that the Liberals would take the contest for granted. Although a vigorous campaign was conducted by his Conservative opponent, J.W Jones Cremlyn, the Liberals held an enthusiastic campaign. One of the most memorable meetings was held at Bethania Chapel in the rural village of Talog. Upon the approach of Hinds's motor car the historic horn apparently used at the time of the Rebecca Riots was sounded and a torchlight procession formed.

=== Parliamentary career ===
In 1917 he was appointed Lord Lieutenant of Carmarthenshire, a post he held until his death.

At the 1918 general election he was elected member of parliament for the new constituency of Carmarthen as a Coalition Liberal.

By the time of the 1922 general election a formal split had occurred in the Liberal Party, and Hinds stood as a National Liberal under the leadership of David Lloyd George. The Conservatives sensed their opportunity to secure a rare triumph in the constituency. However, Hinds held on to win in a four-cornered contest.

In the following year he changed his allegiance, however, to the other Liberal faction led by H. H. Asquith. He retired at the next election in 1923. In his final year in parliament he was chairman of Welsh Liberal Parliamentary party.

== Personal life ==
He married Lizzie Powell in 1893, and the couple had one daughter.

Following his retirement from parliament he continued to be active in local politics, and was Mayor of Carmarthen in 1925–1926. In 1927 he gave a parcel of land to the town of Carmarthen as a recreation ground, now known as Parc Hinds. He was also active in many voluntary and charitable organisations including the Honourable Society of Cymmrodorion, National Eisteddfod Association, the London Welsh Literary Union and the London Welsh Charitable Aid Society. A Baptist by religion, he held the post of president of the Baptist Union of Wales and was a prominent freemason.

He died in a London nursing home following an operation in 1928, three days before his 66th birthday. He was buried in Carmarthen at a service which only men were allowed to attend.

Parliament of the United Kingdom
Preceded by John Lloyd Morgan	Member of Parliament for West Carmarthenshire; December 1910 – 1918	Constituency abolished
New constituency	Member of Parliament for Carmarthen; 1918 – 1923	Succeeded by Ellis Ellis-Griffith
Party political offices
Preceded by Ellis William Davies	Chairman of the Welsh Liberal Federation; 1925–1928	Succeeded by ?
Honorary titles
Preceded by John William Gwynne Hughes	Lord Lieutenant of Carmarthenshire; 1917–1928	Succeeded by The Lord Dynevor
