= Abergele Golf Club =

Golf club in Conwy County Borough, Wales

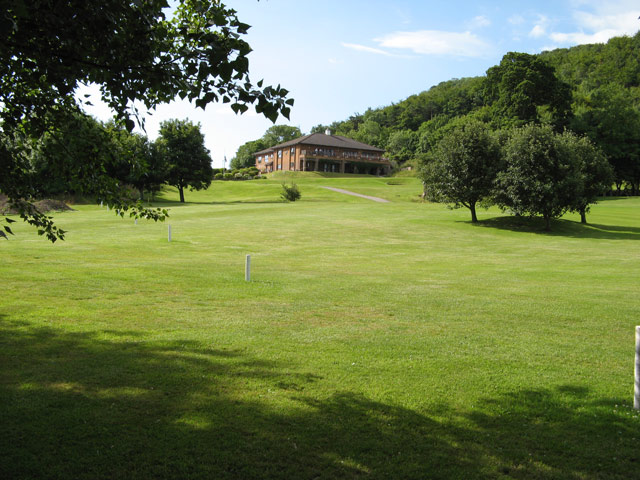

- Location within Wales
- 53.2821725°N 3.5995134°W

Club information
- Location: Tan-y-Gopa Road, Abergele, Conwy, LL22 8DS
- Established: 1910
- Type: Public
- Owner: Abergele Golf Club Ltd
- Tota holes: 18
- Website: www.abergelegolfclub.co.uk
- Par: 72
- Length: 6,547 yards

Abergele Golf Club (Welsh: Clwb Golff Abergele) is a golf club located in Abergele, Conwy, Clwyd, Wales. The 18-hole course was formed in 1910 and established itself at its present location in 1968 near Gwrych Castle and is a member of the Community amateur sports club. It was redesigned between 2002 and 2003 to meet United States Golf Association standards allowing its members and visitors to play on the course all-year round. Abergele Golf Club is regarded by many golf publications to be "one of the most picturesque courses in Wales". Becky Brewerton, a member of the Ladies European Tour, has played on the course, and Abergele Golf Club has held several regional and national golf tournaments.

== History ==
Abergele Golf Club was formed in 1910 and the site's pavilion was opened two years later near Gwrych Castle. Six years later the owners of the land, Dundonald Estates, granted permission for the course to operate on Sundays. The club encountered financial difficulties in 1919 when it guarantors did not pay subscriptions and were required to play 20 shillings each year. Additionally the course's committee members toured Abergele to raise the necessary capital. Tennis courts were prepared in 1922 and remained at the site until hard courts were built in nearby Clwyd Avenue. Beginning in 1935 the first and third Thursdays of each month became known as "Ladies Day".

Membership declined following the outbreak of the Second World War, and in 1942, the Ministry of Agriculture, Fisheries and Food ordered about twenty acres of the land be ploughed up to grow crops and grain as part of the "Dig for Victory" campaign. After the Second World War ended the club expanded when a billiard room, Gentlemen's Locker Room and Professional Shop were built. Abergele Golf Club board members formed into a limited company in March 1967 and purchased more than ninety acres of park land in Gwrych Park from Glyn Parry and John Lloyd Jones. A new clubhouse was opened in 1968 by the Earl of Dundonald and the new course was opened on 3 May 1969.

The Golf Club purchased a practice ground in 1977 for £10,000 and an extension was built to the clubhouse six years later. Abergele Golf Club held its first national tournament, the Welsh Boys Championship, in 1984. In the following year the owners brought land on the east side of the estate to expand the course and a new clubhouse was opened by the President W. Glyn Parry J.P. and the Lady President Pat K. Francis J.P. in 1997. A new putting green was opened in 1998, and in the same year, the first tee was constructed. The Professional's Shop had been dismantled by 1999 and a swing area and golf academy was established on the site. Between 2002 and 2003 the course was reconstructed by David Williams to meet United States Golf Association standards.

== Reception ==
Abergele Golf Club has received positive reception from the press as being "one of the most picturesque courses in Wales". Trudy Carradice wrote in her book Golf in Wales: A Pictorial History that the course is "one of the most interesting in Denbigshire and is well worth playing if you should ever find yourself on this stretch of the North Wales coast".
