= John Jones of Ystrad =

Welsh politician (1777–1842)

John Jones "of Ystrad" (1777–1842), was a Welsh politician, MP for Carmarthen from 1821 to 1832.

== Early life ==
He was born on 15 September 1777 in King Street, Carmarthen, the son of Thomas Jones, a solicitor of Job's Wells and Capel Dewi, Carmarthen and of Anna Maria, daughter of John Jones of Crynfryn, Cardiganshire. Jones was educated at Eton College and Christ Church, Oxford, he went on to Lincoln's Inn to qualify as a barrister. His work on the South Wales circuit took him back to his home area.

== Early political career ==
Carmarthenshire politics in the early nineteenth century featured fierce rivalrey between the Blue (Whig) interest supported by Lord Cawdor of Golden Grove and the red (Tory) interest supported by Lord Dynevor. Jones's father has benn the agent of the Golden Grove under its previous owners, the Vaughan family, before it passed into the hands of Cawdor in 1804. Jones became Mayor of Carmarthen (the politics of the town being similarly polarised by Red-Blue rivalries) with support from the Blue faction in 1809.

However, Cawdor's failure to support his parliamentary aspirations led him to contest Carmarthen Boroughs in the rival Red interest at the 1812 General Election. However he was defeated by the sitting member, Admiral Campbell in a contest described by the Carmarthen Journal as amicable. In 1815, his election to replace Sir Thomas Picton, (who had died at the Battle of Waterloo) as MP for Pembroke Boroughs was engineered by Sir John Owen of Orielton, another supporter of the 'Red' faction. However, in 1818 he was obliged to retire in favoue of John Hensleigh Allen. He again unsuccessfully contested Carmarthen, but eventually won the seat three years later.

== Member for Carmarthen Boroughs ==
Although regarded as a Tory in politics, Jones's main pre-occupation was local politics and after his election to Parliament he concentrated much of his energy upon having a controlling interest in the Carmarthen Town Council.

When Reform legislation was introduced in the House of Commons in 1831, Jones voted against the second reading on 22 March. At the subsequent General Election, he was injured in rioting at the Carmarthen Guildhall. The voting was called off, and the election for the constituency had to be re-run in August, when Jones retained the seat. Later that year he fought a duel with another politician, Robert Fulke Greville.

Despite eventually voting in favour of the Reform Bill, he was defeated in the 1832 general election.

== Member for Carmarthenshire ==
From 1837 to until his death he was MP for Carmarthenshire. His efforts to have the salt tax abolished earned him the nickname "Jones yr Halen" ("Jones the Salt").Jones died on 10 November 1842.

Parliament of the United Kingdom
Preceded by John Campbell	Member of Parliament for Carmarthen; 1821 – 1832	Succeeded by William Yelverton
Preceded by George Rice-Trevor; Sir James Hamlyn-Williams	Member of Parliament for Carmarthenshire; 1837 – 1842; With: George Rice-Trevor	Succeeded by George Rice-Trevor; David Davies
