= Tommy Weale =

Welsh footballer

Personal information
- Full name: Thomas James Weale
- Date of birth: 31 December 1910
- Place of birth: Merthyr Tydfil, Wales
- Date of death: 1971 (aged 60)
- Position: Winger

Senior career*
| Years | Team | Apps | (Gls) |
| 1929–1930 | Swindon Town | 2 | (1) |
| 1931–1933 | Crewe Alexandra | 101 | (27) |
| 1933–1934 | Burnley | 15 | (2) |
| Total | | 118 | (30) |
- * Club domestic league appearances and goals

Thomas James Weale (31 December 1910 – 1971) was a Welsh professional footballer who played as a winger.
