= David Pugh (MP, born 1806) =

British politician (1806–1890)

David Pugh (1806 – 12 July 1890) was a Welsh landowner and Liberal Party politician who sat in the House of Commons from 1857 until 1868 and again from 1885 until his death in 1890.

== Early life and career ==
Pugh was born at Green Hill, Llandeilo, Carmarthenshire (which was later renamed Manoravon), the eldest son of Colonel David Heron Pugh, who was High Sheriff of Carmarthenshire in 1819, and his wife Elizabeth Beynon, daughter of William Beynon of Trewern, Llanddewi Velfrey, Pembrokeshire. His brother, John William Pugh, was Vicar of Llandeilo for fifteen years.

Pugh was educated at Rugby School and Balliol College, Oxford, graduating in 1828. In 1837 he was called to the Bar at Inner Temple and for some years he practiced on the Northern Circuit.

== Local Government and Administration ==
From an early age, Pugh took a close interest in the life of his locality and never devoted himself fully to a legal career. From 1843 until 1852 he was Chairman of the Carmarthesnhire Quarter Sessions, and also served as a Justice of the Peace for Carmarthenshire and Cardiganshire and as Deputy Lieutenant. He held a commission as a captain in the Carmarthenshire Rifle Volunteers.

Following the death of his brother in 1852, Pugh abandoned his legal career and settled at Manoravon, where he set about developing the estate. He purchased a considerable proportion of the neighbouring Gulston estate for £45,000 and also owned property through his mother's family in the Teifi valley and at St Clears. He was regarded as a popular landlord, partly due to his practice of supporting local tradesmen rather than those based in London. At the time of his death it was said that he regularly granted rent abatements at times of agricultural depression. This was often cited as a reason for his political success, particularly in later life.

Pugh owned nearly 10,000 acres (40 km^{2}) of land.and was a well known breeder of shorthorn cattle.

He was patron and speaker at the Carmarthen Eisteddfod of 1867. He was owner of the Pwll Perkins mine, or Garnant Colliery where a disaster led to the loss of 10 lives in 1884. In 1887 he presented a church clock to Llandeilo Parish Church, although the issue of its upkeep caused controversy in the locality.

== Political career: MP for Carmarthenshire, 1857-1868 ==
In 1857, following the death of David Saunders Davies, Pugh emerged as a candidate for Carmarthenshire and served until 1868. The local Conservative newspaper, the Carmarthen Journal, favoured John Lloyd Davies, former member for Cardigan, and regarded Pugh as an 'untried man'. However, Pugh carried the day, having been proposed at the hustings at Llandeilo by W.R.H. Powell.

Although Pugh attracted some criticism for his support of the abolition of church rates, he was returned unopposed, along with David Jones of Pantglas, at the General Election of 1859.

During this period his politics were often regarded as somewhat ambiguous and he was described as both a Liberal and a Conservative. This proved his undoing at the 1868 General Election when he was defeated in a four-cornered contest for the two seats. On the one hand, Edward Sartoris, a radical Liberal actively sought the support of both the radical wing of the Liberal Party and the powerful nonconformist interest. The Conservatives, meanwhile, fielded both John Jones (brother of the previous member, David Jones, who stood down) and Henry Puxley, a landowner with extensive interests in Ireland. There was much focus during the campaign upon disestablishment of the Church of England in Ireland and Pugh's views were regarded as vague, thus alienating both traditional Conservatives who supported Jones and Puxley, and the more radical Liberals who were supported Sartoris. Pugh, who had been returned unopposed at previous elections, fought a lacklustre campaign, which was chiefly brought to life by the active support of Pugh's close friend, W.R.H. Powell. Although the result was determined to a great extent by a significant increase in the number of industrial workers who were enfranchised, Pugh's defeat was later ascribed to his 'hazy and indefinite opinions'. He was said to have accepted his defeat with 'good humour' but was thereafter regarded as a supporter of Gladstone.

== Later political career: MP for East Carmarthenshire, 1885-1890 ==
Following his defeat, Pugh withdrew from active political life for some years, but served as High Sheriff of Carmarthenshire in 1874.

In later years, Pugh's political views became more radical, and in 1884 he presided at a great demonstration, attended by hundreds of agricultural labourers, in Carmarthen in favour of franchise reform. By 1885 he fully supported disestablishment of the Church of England in Wales. Following the boundary changes introduced as a result of the 1884 Reform Act, the Carmarthenshire parliamentary constituency was divided into eastern and western divisions. The sitting Liberal member, W.R.H. Powell chose to contest the Western division against the other sitting member, Lord Emlyn.

However, the Eastern division which contained industrial settlements emerging as a result of the anthracite coal-mining and tinplate industries was considered to be the strongest for the Liberals, as a result of the increased numbers of working-class voters in these communities. For example, the number of voters in that part of the parish of Llanelli that was outside the borough constituency rose from 615 to 1,500, Similarly, the electorate in Pembrey increased from 377 to 1,000, in Hendy from 190 to 620, in Brynamman from 175 to 450, and in Cwmamman from 164 to 550. Nearing eighty years of age, Pugh emerged as a contender for the Liberal nomination and addressed the inaugural meeting of the new Liberal association at Ammanford alongside Lewis Morris and John Lloyd Morgan. Some weeks later, the first gathering of the Council of the new Liberal Association saw Pugh unanimously selected as candidate. He was elected with a large majority over Sir Marteine Lloyd of Bronwydd.

Pugh supported Gladstone's Irish Home Rule Bill and was re-elected unopposed when a further general election was held in 1886.

Within two years, however, there was increasing criticism within the Liberal Association of Pugh's conduct as member, and particularly his absence from what were perceived to be important divisions in the Commons. He made no recorded contributions to Commons debates during his post-1885 Commons service. It was claimed in January 1888 that, apart from a short speech when re-elected in 1886, he had made no political speeches in the constituency since his election. Following the annual meeting of the Liberal Association at Ammanford on 23 May 1888, when these criticisms were aired by younger members of the Association, a special meeting was called on 30 June to consider the representation of the division. A number of alternative candidates were suggested for the next election and the Rev. Towyn Jones declared that any future candidate should be a radical and a nonconformist. His attendance at the Commons again led to criticism at the annual meeting the following year. In June 1890, Pugh announced that he would not be seeking re-election. He died soon afterwards.

Pugh never married. He died at the Metropole Hotel in London, aged 84. He left the bulk of his estate to his kinsman, John Beynon of Trewern, Pembrokeshire.

Parliament of the United Kingdom
Preceded by David Jones; David Arthur Saunders Davies	Member of Parliament for Carmarthenshire; 1857 – 1868; With: David Jones	Succeeded by Edward John Sartoris; John Jones
New constituency see Carmarthenshire	Member of Parliament for Carmarthenshire East; 1885 – 1890	Succeeded by Abel Thomas
