= Bill Roberts (footballer, born 1908) =

Welsh footballer

Personal information
- Full name: William Samuel Roberts
- Date of birth: 12 July 1908
- Place of birth: Bargoed, Wales
- Date of death: 22 February 1976
- Place of death: Bristol, England
- Height: 5 ft 10 1/2 in (1.79 m)
- Position: Right back

Youth career
- 19??–19??: Army

Senior career*
| Years | Team | Apps | (Gls) |
| 1932–1933 | Tottenham Hotspur | 0 | (0) |
| 1933–1938 | Bristol City | 135 | (7) |
| 1938–1939 | Newport County | 41 | (0) |
- * Club domestic league appearances and goals

William Samuel Roberts (12 July 1908 – 22 February 1976) was a Welsh footballer who played as a right back. He made over 170 Football League appearances in the years before the Second World War.

== Career ==
Bill Roberts was born in Bargoed and began his footballing career in the Army. He signed briefly for Tottenham Hotspur in 1932. Bob Hewison signed tough tackling Roberts in September 1933 for Bristol City. Bill Roberts followed Ernie Brinton to Newport County in July 1938. Roberts was captured by the Germans in France whiles serving during the Second World War. Later Bill Roberts was landlord of the "Elm Tree" pub in Bishopsworth, Bristol then worked locally for HM Customs & Excise. He died in Bristol, aged 67.

== Honours ==
with Bristol City

- Welsh Cup winner 1934

with Newport County

- Football League Third Division South winner: 1938–39
