= Community amateur sports club =

Sports club with favourable UK tax rules

The Community Amateur Sports Club (CASC) scheme was introduced in 2002 by the then Labour government to support grass roots sport. The original legislation was drafted by Andrew Phillips. A 10 Minute Rule Bill was introduced by Loughborough MP Andrew Reed based on the Andrew Phillips draft legislation. It recognises the importance of sport in the community by allowing local amateur sports clubs to register with HM Revenue and Customs (HMRC) as a sports club rather than a business for rates and tax purposes. As such, clubs can benefit from a range of tax reliefs, including Gift Aid and rate relief. Both property and non-property owning clubs can significantly benefit from the scheme.

A community amateur sports club (CASC) in the United Kingdom is an amateur sports club eligible for favourable treatment for taxation purposes, with some similarities to charitable status. The benefits include eligibility for Gift Aid tax relief on donations, relief from at least 80% of business rates, and special treatment for capital gains tax and corporation tax purposes.

The main criteria for registration are:

- "the club must be open to the whole community"
- "the club's main purpose must be to provide facilities for eligible sports, and to encourage people to take part in them"
- "the club must be organised on an amateur basis"

More than 6,200 clubs, including more than 425 rugby clubs, are registered as CASCs.

The Sport and Recreation Alliance (formerly the Central Council for Physical Recreation) maintains an information service cascinfo.co.uk which provides information about the CASC system.

== History ==
Following the issuing of a consultation document by Her Majesty's Treasury in 2001, the Sport and Recreation Alliance (then CCPR) - who had campaigned for tax relief for clubs since 1999 - provided HMT with two proposals to help local sports clubs which HMT accepted:

1. Following a Charity Commission policy change, sports clubs could register as charities; and
2. Sports clubs could register as a Community Amateur Sport Club under a tax scheme

On 30 November 2001, the Charity Commission announced that it would now recognise as charitable: "The promotion of community participation in healthy recreation by the provision of facilities for the playing of particular sports."

Then on 17 April 2002, in his Budget, the Chancellor of the Exchequer introduced a package of tax reliefs to support Community Amateur Sports Clubs (CASCs) as an alternative route for those CASCs unable or unwilling to apply for charitable status.

=== Key dates ===
In 2002 the CASC scheme was established in Schedule 18 of the Finance Act with effect from April 2002 but has since been replaced with Chapter 9 Part 13 of the Corporation Tax Act 2010. CASCs were granted the opportunity to claim Gift Aid on donations meaning up to an additional £28 for every £100 donated. Since 6 April 2011 the amount that can be reclaimed has been reduced to £25 for every £100 donated.

The 2003 Local Government Act enabled registered CASCs to claim 80% mandatory rate relief on business rates providing CASCs "parity with charity" from April 2004. Local authorities can grant an additional 20% rate relief to clubs at their discretion.

In 2004, the threshold for exemption from Corporation Tax on trading and rental income was raised.

== CASC rules ==
In order to be eligible for CASC status clubs need to meet certain qualifying conditions. For a club to be eligible for CASC status it must be able to demonstrate that it meets a number of conditions shown below.

=== Open to the whole of the community ===
Clubs will need to ensure that they are open to the whole community. One aspect of this is to ensure that the cost to participate is not prohibitive. To be considered open to the whole of the community:

- a club must be open to all without discrimination (membership or use of facilities)

When determining who can join or make use of a club's facilities, a CASC cannot discriminate on the grounds of ethnicity, nationality, sexual orientation, religion or belief, sex, age or disability – except when it's necessary for taking part in a particular sport.

- costs associated with membership must not represent a significant obstacle to membership, use of facilities or full participation in the club's activities

CASCs must ensure that costs associated with membership of the club are not a significant obstacle to membership or to the use of its facilities. If the sport is an expensive one, the club must show what it does to make membership affordable for the whole community.

Clubs where membership and participation costs are £520 or less a year will be considered to be open to the whole community.

Clubs where membership and participation costs are in excess of £520 a year will need to demonstrate that there are special provisions in place, and the provisions are used in practice, for members on low or modest incomes to be able to participate fully in the club's activities for £520 or less a year.

Examples include:

- Open days and taster sessions
- Free coaching and equipment loan
- Discounted and concessionary membership fees, possibly including means tested membership
- Charitable fund/bursaries for young people who may not be able to afford membership, coaching and / or equipment
- Clear advertisement of all the opportunities and packages available to play at the club

Clubs can charge a maximum annual membership fee of £1,612 or £31 per week and be a CASC but have to offer a range of concessions to people who can't afford membership at this level.

=== Participate fully ===
Members must be able to participate fully in a club's sporting activities. The Government recognises that sports clubs will have different membership structures and levels of access to the activities of the club and will vary by club and by sport.

- Clubs that are open seven days a week will need to provide a member with full access at least three days a week on days that suit the member, including weekends.
- Where a club is open on limited days of the week, for example at weekends only, or at certain times of the year, clubs must ensure that members have access to facilities at least half the time they are open, at times convenient to the member, so that any member can participate fully in the sporting activities of the club even if they are paying a lower amount than other members because they are on a low income.

=== Costs associated with membership and participation ===
The costs associated with membership of the club will include all the mandatory costs that arise as a result of taking part in a particular sport, and not just the annual subscription or membership fee. They will also include the cost of any specialised or mandatory equipment.

For example, membership fees may include insurance costs, joining fee and affiliation fees (if required) and exclude for example, optional coaching fees or national fees.

Costs associated with membership also include the cost of specialist equipment or items that are required to take part in a sport. There are a number of options for clubs to consider.

- A club can hire out equipment to members – they would need to account only for the hire cost.
- A club can loan equipment for free.
- A club can arrange a rota system to share equipment.

If a member has to provide their own specialised equipment then the cost must be included as part of the costs of being a member of the club. In calculating these costs a club does not need to take into account the most expensive equipment, just the cost of equipment that will allow a person to participate. For example, if a second-hand set of golf clubs is acceptable, then the typical cost of such a set needs to be included.

Specialised equipment or items do not include objects that a member would normally be expected to own, such as trainers, basic gym clothing and waterproofs.

If the club requires specific branded equipment or clothing then these costs will count towards the costs associated with the sport.

=== Temporary members ===
Some clubs will have some form of temporary membership to encourage new members into the sport without having to commit to pay for a full year's membership.

Clubs that allow temporary members to use their facilities will need to charge fees equivalent to the annual costs to full members, to include match fees and fees for hiring courts and so on. For example, if the annual costs of membership were £240 for twelve months then temporary membership for two months would need to cost no more than £40. All income from a temporary member will be considered as coming from a non-member and will count towards the clubs non-member income threshold.

=== Different membership rates for different people ===
Clubs may still be open to the community if they charge different groups of people different amounts. However, clubs will still need to ensure that they do not discriminate against any particular groups or individuals. For example, it may be acceptable to charge a lower fee for a membership class in return for reduced access to the club's facilities, subject to ensuring that the members continue to be able to participate fully in the sport.

=== Organised on an amateur basis ===
Clubs must be organised on an amateur basis although under the new rules clubs will be able to financially support players subject to a limit of £10,000 a year per club.

A club is organised on an amateur basis if it meets the following conditions:

- it is non-profit making
- it only provides its members and their guests with the sort of benefits an amateur sports club would normally provide ('ordinary benefits')
- it does not exceed the limit on paid players
- its rules provide that if the club is wound up, any property left after the payment of debts will be used for approved sporting or charitable purposes.

=== Paying players ===
Clubs will be allowed to pay a maximum of £10,000 a year in total to players to play for that club. There will be no limit on the number of players a club can pay at any one time.

The £10,000 limit includes the cost of benefits a player receives in consequence of playing for the club. For example, for an overseas player, the cost of flights, obtaining a visa and accommodation would need to be included.

Even where there has been no actual cost to the club this must be included. A common example is where a member provides accommodation free of charge to an overseas player. This is a benefit and will need to be factored in when the club calculates its payments to players.

The rule on paying players will have no effect on the tax position of the player or the club. It is simply a rule about qualification as a CASC. Players should be taxed under the normal rules for employment or self-employment as appropriate.

Reimbursement of travel and subsistence payments that were incurred as a result of an away match would not be a benefit, so long as the rest of the team, including players who are not paid players, also had their expenses reimbursed.

Payments to players must be agreed and minuted by the club's committee and the amounts must be determined on an arm's length basis.

Officials of the club will not be entitled to receive payments for playing for the club.

=== Travel and subsistence ===
Clubs will be allowed to pay appropriate and reasonable travel and subsistence costs to members who travel to away matches and sporting events as well as travel expenses where the time spent in travelling in each direction is two hours or more (four hours in total).

This applies to players and a small number of officials who will be participating in the match. Spectators and other supporters will not be eligible to receive expenses.

Clubs can reimburse reasonable overnight expenses where it is not practical to make the journey home. This includes costs such as a hotel and an evening meal within standard limits.

HMRC standard rates for travel and subsistence will apply to all CASCs.

Clubs will be allowed to pay expenses to members for the cost of touring with a club. Players will be expected to play, compete or train on at least 75% of the days on tour.

HMRC standard rates for overseas travel and subsistence will apply.

Where a club pays for a member to go on tour the club will need to demonstrate that the tour promoted and encouraged sporting participation.

=== Main purpose is the provision of facilities for, and the promotion of participation in, one or more eligible sports ===
In order to be eligible for the CASC scheme, a clubs main purpose must be to providing facilities for eligible sports and to encourage people to take part in them. As a result, under the new rules at least 50% of members must be participating members of the club, i.e. they participate in the sport at least 12 times a year.

An eligible sport is defined as a sport recognised by certain Sports Councils (Sport England, Sport Scotland, Sports Council of Wales, Sports Council of Northern Ireland and UK Sport).

=== Participating members ===
The main purpose of the club must be to provide facilities for an eligible sport and to encourage participation in that sport. To qualify as a CASC at least 50% of all members must be participating members, that is they must participate in the sporting activities of the club on a regular basis.

This threshold ensures that the main purpose of the club is clearly the provision of facilities for and promotion of, sport and is not used primarily as a social club.

To be considered a participating member, individuals will need to be participating in an eligible sporting activity on at least 12 occasions a year.

A participating member will be an individual who:

- plays in the sport (adults and juniors) or
- has a specific volunteer role in the running of the club which facilitates the effective provision of the club's eligible sport. Members that do not meet these conditions will be deemed to be social members.

=== The income condition ===
All CASCs must meet the new income condition which ensures that CASCs are mainly sports clubs rather than mainly commercial clubs with sports activities.

Clubs will be able to generate unlimited income from transactions with their members. Membership fees, income from transactions with members such as the sale of food and drink or equipment, hiring club premises for private parties and so on will be excluded from the income condition.

Investment income and donations received will also be excluded from the income condition.

The income condition will apply to the turnover or receipts received from broadly commercial transactions with non-members, where the club is offering a commercial service or supply, for example:

- sales of food and drink
- sales of equipment
- hiring out facilities.

Non-members include:

- guests
- parents of junior members (if they are not members in their own right)
- temporary members
- visiting players or teams.

The maximum amount of turnover or receipts that a club may receive under the income condition will be £100,000 a year, excluding VAT. Clubs generating higher levels of income will need to consider setting up a trading subsidiary.

The thresholds on the exemptions for UK trading income and property UK income will be increased to:

- £50,000 of receipts (from £30,000) for trading income
- £30,000 of receipts (from £20,000) for property income.

Where receipts exceed the threshold then, as now, all the income received will become chargeable to corporation tax.

=== The location condition ===
The location condition makes it clear that the CASC scheme is open to qualifying sports clubs in other European Community Member States or relevant territories.

=== The management condition ===
This condition is met where a club has managers that are fit and proper persons to be managers of the club. Club managers mean persons having the general control and management of the administration of the club.
