= Edward John Sartoris =

Edward John Sartoris (30 May 1814 – 23 November 1888) was a British Liberal politician and landowner of Swiss ancestry.

== Early life ==
The eldest son of Huguenot banker Peter Urban Sartoris (1767–1833), of Sceaux, near Paris, and his wife Matilda, the daughter of the Scottish-American banker John Tunno (1746-1819), Edward was born in London and educated at Trinity College, Cambridge. In 1842, he married the opera singer Adelaide Kemble. The family initially leased Knuston Hall near Irchester, Northamptonshire. In 1863, on the death of his maternal uncle Edward Tunno, he inherited estates at Warnford, Hampshire and Llangennech, Carmarthenshire. The Welsh estate included large coal deposits.

== Member of Parliament ==
The County of Carmarthenshire was represented in the House of Commons by two members of Parliament. For many years prior to 1868 elections had been uncontested, with both MPs being Conservatives. The members were effectively chosen by the powerful Campbell family, Earls Cawdor.

The Reform Act 1867 had greatly increased the franchise, allowing large numbers of working-class men to vote for the first time. This, along with difficulties in the Conservative Party over candidate selection, led the Carmarthenshire Liberals to decide to contest the 1868 general election. Rather than choosing a member of the landed gentry, the party chose Sartoris as their candidate. As a relative newcomer to the area he benefitted from being seen as an "outsider", not subject to the traditional land owning interests. He was also based in the rapidly industrialising Llanelli district, the only part of the county where there was population growth. With an efficient party machine, largely organised by non-conformist clergymen of the district, Sartoris secured a spectacular victory, his 3,280 votes easily winning the first seat in the constituency. The Conservative Party learnt from their defeat, at the next election in 1874 Earl Cawdor's eldest son, Viscount Emlyn, regained the seat from Sartoris.

== Later life ==
Sartoris retired to his Hampshire estate, Warnford Park, in 1874.

Their children were:

- Greville Edward (1843-1873)
- Mary (May) Theodosia (1845-1925) m. Henry Evans Gordon (1842–1909), a Member of the London Stock Exchange and brother of the MP William Evans-Gordon She was the subject of several paintings and drawings by family friend Lord Leighton.
- Algernon Charles Frederick (1851-1893) m. Ellen (Nellie) Wrenshall Grant (1855-1922) on 21 May 1874 in the East Room of the White House.

He was a justice of the peace for the county, and an enthusiastic sportsman and yachtsman. In 1878 his yacht May won the Hamble River Regatta. He died in Hampshire in November 1888 aged 74.

He was a cousin of the French politician Henri Greffulhe, and a nephew of Edward Rose Tunno.

Parliament of the United Kingdom
Preceded by David Jones; David Pugh	Member of Parliament for Carmarthenshire; 1868–1874; With: John Jones	Succeeded by Viscount Emlyn; John Jones
