= David Jones (Carmarthenshire MP) =

Welsh banker and politician (1810–1869)

Member of Parliament for Carmarthenshire
- In office 9 April 1852 – 27 November 1868 Serving with David Saunders Davies (1852–1857); David Pugh (1857–1868)
- Preceded by: George Rice-Trevor; David Saunders Davies
- Succeeded by: Edward Sartoris; John Jones

Personal details
- Born: 1 November 1810 Llwynberllan, Carmarthenshire, Wales
- Died: 1 July 1869 (aged 58) Pantglas, Carmarthenshire, Wales
- Party: Conservative
- Spouse: Margaret Campbell (m. 1845–1869)
- Children: 4

David Jones (1 November 1810 – 1 July 1869) was a Welsh banker and Conservative Party politician.

== Early life ==
Born in Llwynberllan near Llandovery, Carmarthenshire, he was the eldest son of John and Mary Jones and was educated at Charterhouse School. He married Margaret Charlotte Campbell, daughter of Sir George Campbell, 4th Baronet in 1845. They made their home at Glanebrane Park, Llandovery and had 2 daughters and 2 sons. He held the office of High Sheriff of Carmarthenshire in 1845 and was a deputy lieutenant for Breconshire, Carmarthenshire and Radnorshire.

== Banking ==
His grandfather, also David Jones, had established a bank in Llandovery in 1799, and on his death in 1839 the business passed to David and his two younger brothers, William and John. The brothers expanded the bank as David Jones & Company. In about 1850 Jones purchased the 7,854 acre estate of Pantglas, Llanfynydd and built a large house there at the considerable cost of £30,000. The Italianate mansion had a central tower and classical colonnades and a top-lit hall with large mahogany staircase.

== Member of parliament ==
In April 1852 the Hon. George Rice-Trevor, one of two members of parliament for the County of Carmarthenshire, succeeded his father as Baron Dynevor. This led to a vacancy, and Jones was chosen to defend the seat for the Conservatives. As the only candidate he was elected unopposed to the House of Commons on 13 May. He held the seat for 16 years, being returned at each general election without opposition.

At a time when the parliamentary representation Carmarthenshire was largely dependent on informal agreements between prominent local landowners to avoid contested elections much emphasis was placed upon appealing to a broad range of what was regarded as 'moderate' opinion. Jones's address to the electors when seeking re-election in 1857 reflects this as he declared that "I shall, if re-elected, be prepared to give my independent, but not indiscriminate, support to any Government which shall bring forward measures that may appear to me likely to promote the common welfare." Nominating Jones at Carmarthen shortly after, W.R.H. Powell of Maesgwynne declared that "they no longer saw the red and blue flags unfurled, which to his mind was an evidence that party feeling was dying out in the country".

== Death ==
By 1868 Jones was in ill-health, and decided not to contest the general election. His seat was held by his younger brother, John. He died at Pantglas in July 1869, and was buried in the family vault at Cilycwm Church.

Parliament of the United Kingdom
Preceded by Hon. George Rice-Trevor; David Saunders Davies	Member of Parliament for Carmarthenshire; 1852 – 1868; With: David Saunders Davies (1852–1857); David Pugh (1857–1868)	Succeeded by Edward John Sartoris; John Jones
