= John St. Bodfan Gruffydd =

Welsh landscape architect

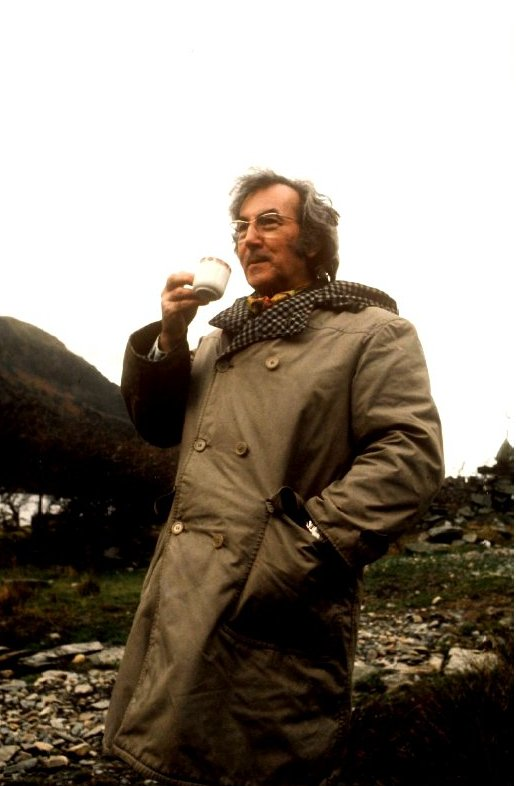
- Bodfan Gruffydd at Llanberis, Wales, 1973
- Born: April 5, 1910; Plas Eryr, Gwynedd, Wales
- Died: November 25, 2004 (aged 94); Worcester, England
- Occupation: Landscape architect

John St. Bodfan Gruffydd (5 April 1910 – 25 November 2004) was a Welsh landscape architect.

== Early life ==
John St Bodfan Gruffydd was born on 5 April 1910 at Plas Eryr, Snowdonia (Eryri), Gwynedd, Wales, the son of William St Bodfan Griffith, and into a farming family. His maternal grandfather, descended from cattle drovers at Castell, Gwynedd, qualified as a doctor of medicine at Edinburgh, eventually settling at Llanddeiniolen as a GP, a practice mostly with slate quarrymen at Bethesda. Bodfan spent the first few years of his life in his grandfather's home. His paternal grandfather farmed at Henfaes, Aber, Gwynedd, but a typhoid epidemic decimated the family and he escaped only by going to New Zealand. Bodfan's father studied at University College, Bangor, and at Aberystwyth, and later in 1913 he moved the family (including two older sisters) to a teaching appointment in Uppingham School, Rutland, in England, where he was also in charge of the Officers' Training Corps.

The family stayed there during World War I and Bodfan did not attend school till he was seven because "my grandfather believed it was bad to force young children" and, even after attending Miss Masters' dame school (with its Quaker leanings) he did not learn to read until aged nine. The weekly dancing lessons were more successful and it was only later when quite grown up that he discovered he had dyslexia. (As an adult he had handwriting tuition in Eric Gill's studio, a skill he exercised into his late 80s, as witnessed in his beautiful yearly Christmas greeting cards.) Summer holidays were invariably spent back in Porthdinllaen, on the Llŷn peninsula, south Caernarfonshire, now part of the coastal AONB. Porthdinllaen farm occupied most of the land between the bay and Edern village: an idyllic location and a haven for wildlife, plants and insects, fruit trees and picturesque coastal scenery. Bodfan's mother used to say, "It's a lovely day, off you go and enjoy yourselves for, remember, the opportunity will never come again". She was the first pupil at Bangor County School for Girls and went on to University College, Bangor, where she played hockey and tennis before graduating in botany from Bedford College. She and her husband were keen botanists and no doubt influenced the development of Bodfan's later career.

Following World War I the family moved from Uppingham back to Bangor in 1926 where his father became headmaster at Friars School. Their house was on high ground above the tunnel for the railway from Bangor to Holyhead. Bodfan's father frequently took his son out 'botanising' up the Nant Francon pass: an experience in which, Bodfan claims, he became aware of ecological relationships.

== Education and training ==
Bodfan, aged 12, "scraped into the bottom class" at Uppingham School - on the basis of an IQ test. He had failed all the standard examinations ("he could not remember ever having passed any exam"). He found French and Latin much easier than English - Latin being "more logical like Welsh". At Uppingham School he "enjoyed the freedom and sporting activities away from his parents". The problem of what subjects to follow was curtailed by a school epidemic and all boys were sent home; his mother presented him with a pamphlet extolling the joys of landscape architecture and, for 'work experience', he was sent to spend some time with Thomas Mawson, planner and landscape architect in Lancaster. Instead of going back to school, he remained as an articled pupil and began learning about surveying, planning and design, classical gardens and botany of the Lake District. To develop his horticultural knowledge he went to RHS Wisley in 1928 but wasn't too enamoured with the teaching he received and, despite being introduced to rock gardens, the work of Gertrude Jekyll, Lutyens and the Chelsea Flower Show, he was expelled from the course for a minor misdemeanour. There was a period of further pupilage at Mawson's London office which he found exciting but he felt he'd had enough of education and his parents agreed he needed a break.

So off to New Zealand he went - staying on a farm but the two years working cattle and horse riding did not attract him to a career in agriculture. After a bout of appendicitis, he spent his convalescence exploring the country until quite by chance Jack Mawson (a son of Thomas) arrived in Wellington as Director of Town Planning just as the farming experience finished and a happy useful working relationship developed. During this time he attended courses in economics, sociology and statistical method as well as in library cataloguing at the Library of the House of Representatives. Altogether he spent four years in the antipodes but nostalgia for Britain beckoned and Bodfan made his way back to Wales only to confront again the problem of his jumbled up training.

Bangor had a three-year agriculture diploma course that did not require a matriculation qualification (the New Zealand farmwork being taken in lieu) so this was applied for (in 1932). The course consisted of botany, chemistry, economics, forestry, zoology with two summers of farm work, including a term on a poultry and dairy farm in East Lothian and a period on a mixed farm in Cornwall. But having to be a vet was too much and "then and there" decided that he had no future in farming livestock. And travel was still in his veins and he set off in his final year to Skåna in Sweden to study fruit farming and subsequently to Uppsala for one year doing soil science. He concluded that the "landscape of Sweden was not unattractive but the sheer monotony made people feel ill - 'Uppsala luft' - no wonder too much schnapps was consumed!". In 1936 he "left Sweden with mixed feelings" to attend a practical course in market gardening at a local farm institute in Wales and as fresh fruit and vegetables were not obtainable locally in Llyn he decided to grow them himself. As John St Bodfan Gruffydd (*) he set up his business, in 1942 became AILA, and by 1945 was "selling the best strawberries sold in Liverpool market!" (* the date when Bodfan adopted the Gruffydd spelling is not clear - it was after Uppingham but before producing what is believed to be his first landscape drawing.)

Then in 1945 and quite serendipitously David Lloyd George asked Bodfan to design a garden in memory of his wife, Dame Margaret. And so he was able to turn all the talents he had acquired over 20 years to design and planting, and, in his own words, "I suddenly realised that it was landscape itself and its design which really interested me".

== Career ==
Work experience in landscape design began in private practice in 1946 in Wales: the first commission being a memorial garden to Dame Margaret Lloyd George at Coed Morg, Abersoch, and then later many other Welsh gardens, housing estates (with Colwyn Foulkes, which won bronze medals, and Clough Williams-Ellis) and industrial premises, including land reclamation. Subsequently, in 1953 Bodfan was employed as landscape architect to the development corporations in the new towns of Harlow (with Frederick Gibberd) and Crawley, 1953-7 and 1957-61 respectively, before resuming private practice in the late 1950s. During his time in the new towns he worked hard to establish landscape architecture as a valued sister profession to architecture and planning, engineering and contracting, which led to the formulation of a code of practice for more useful and effective collaborations.

Following an invitation to teach ‘landscape’ to architectural students at the Gloucestershire College of Art in Cheltenham in 1960, he and the head of architecture, Stuart Sutcliffe, developed ideas for a full-time course in landscape architecture. Working with the architecture course (situated in the Pittville Park Pump Room) and the Pershore College of Horticulture, the four-year course started in 1961 and quickly gained exemption from the intermediate examination of the Institute of Landscape Architects (and later in 1972, the full written examination). (The course continues at the University of Gloucestershire.)

At this time, Bodfan also took up junior and senior Harvard fellowships at Dumbarton Oaks when he studied American landscape and urban design extensively and in depth. There he travelled widely and visited various landscape schools giving lectures and critiques. This pioneering evidence reinforced his awareness of the need for a structured educational programme in landscape architecture back in Britain. His report on these experiences sadly was never published but it is clear he benefitted greatly from his voyage of discovery to most of the 50 states, an acquaintance which informed his nascent thinking of the importance of natural beauty, genius loci, wildernesses and national parks, subjects which continued to be at the forefront of his thinking for the rest of his life.

From the 1960s on, Bodfan maintained his private practice with an office in London and a ‘practice office’ attached to the college course (initially in Malvern Hill House, Cheltenham, later at the Oxstalls campus in Gloucester) to which students were directed for observation and experience of professional working conditions.

From 1965 he undertook three years of research into landscape architecture for new hospitals sponsored by the King Edward's Hospital Fund for London and at the end of the decade Bodfan was honoured by becoming the president of the Institute of Landscape Architects (1969–71). His work commissions continued apace and additionally he was often called to public enquiries and the House of Lords to give evidence as an expert witness. Examples of the former include proposals concerning the Green Belt around Bristol and a visual impact assessment of the Llanberis pumped storage hydro-electric scheme. Later Bodfan completed studies for a long term landscape development plan for the Esso Refinery on Southampton Water, and a Leverhulme Research Study on Protecting Historic Landscapes. His consultancy involved a variety of commissions including country park proposals at Sandringham, Beaulieu and Stratfield Saye among others, a new computer centre for the Department of the Environment at Swansea, a campus landscape at Robinson College, Cambridge. (for which he received an honorary fellowship), urban and out-of-town shopping centres, biological corridors for Milford Haven and London, flood relief schemes for the Rivers Mole and Wey and a number of housing and garden projects large and small. The historic parks at Orwell and Shrublands in Suffolk and Stonor in Oxfordshire also received his attention. In the mid-1970s, when the Garden History Society was concerned to protect historic landscapes, he suggested the setting-up of a Historic Landscapes Council analogous to the Historic Buildings Council; but the idea was not implemented.

For many years he served as independent member on the Secretary of State for Transport's Landscape Advisory Committee for Motorways and Trunk Roads and as the representative of the Landscape Institute on the Council of the International Federation of Landscape Architects (IFLA). He was the Institute representative on the Council of the National Trust. Then came the post of landscape consultant to the Ebbw Vale Council for the development of their Civic Centre and for the Fort George development in Guernsey. While he took on fewer projects in the 1990s he was still very active helping local groups fight what he believed as insensitive proposals often by developers and planners. His last professional appearance was at a quarry inquiry in his beloved Snowdonia in 1996 - his side won - a fitting conclusion to a professional landscape career commencing and finishing in north Wales, but with a wealth of experience in between.

He died on 25 November 2004, aged 94.

== Publications ==
He was responsible (over a number of years) for the Landscape Section of the Specification published annually by the Architectural Press, and the following research reports: In 1967, he wrote a report on landscape for hospitals; it remained for decades the only work of its kind.; Dawley and Telford Landscape Reports, 1965/66; Esso, Fawley, Landscape Report, 1970; his articles cover a range of subjects, notably historic gardens, estate landscapes, natural beauty, trees in the landscape; there were also two books, Protecting Historic Landscapes, the Stanley Smith Horticultural Trust, 1977, and Tree Form, Size and Colour – a design guide, E & F N Spon, 1987.

== See also ==
- Historic landscape characterisation
