= Edward Rose Tunno =

British politician (1794–1863)

Edward Rose Tunno (1794–1863) was a Member of the Parliament of the United Kingdom for Bossiney, Cornwall, 1826–1832.

He had homes at Llangennech, near Llanelli, Carmarthenshire, Wales; Boverton Castle, Llantwit Major, Glamorganshire, Wales; and 19 Upper Brook Street, London, England. In 1825 he married Caroline Raikes, a cousin of General Robert Raikes, but they had no children.

His father was John Tunno (1746–1819), a Scottish-born merchant and slave trader who had made a fortune in Charleston, South Carolina and, after the American Revolution, another in London as a member of Lloyd's of London and a friend of Sir Thomas Baring. His mother was Margaret Rose of Charleston, who married John Tunno in 1781. She was the daughter of John Rose, another Scot descended from the Roses of Clava, in Nairnshire, who had 42,000 acres of rice plantations in South Carolina and interests in Jamaica.

Acting as executor to his father-in-law Job Raikes's (1767-1833) estate, that included plantation interests at Trinity plantation in Jamaica, he was listed as a claimant for compensation after the passing of the Slavery Abolition Act 1833.

His coalmine at Llangennech was worked by James Shears from 1824.

He was the uncle of the MP Edward John Sartoris (1814–88), to whom he bequeathed much of his estate.
