= Hugh Emyr Davies =

Welsh Presbyterian minister and poet

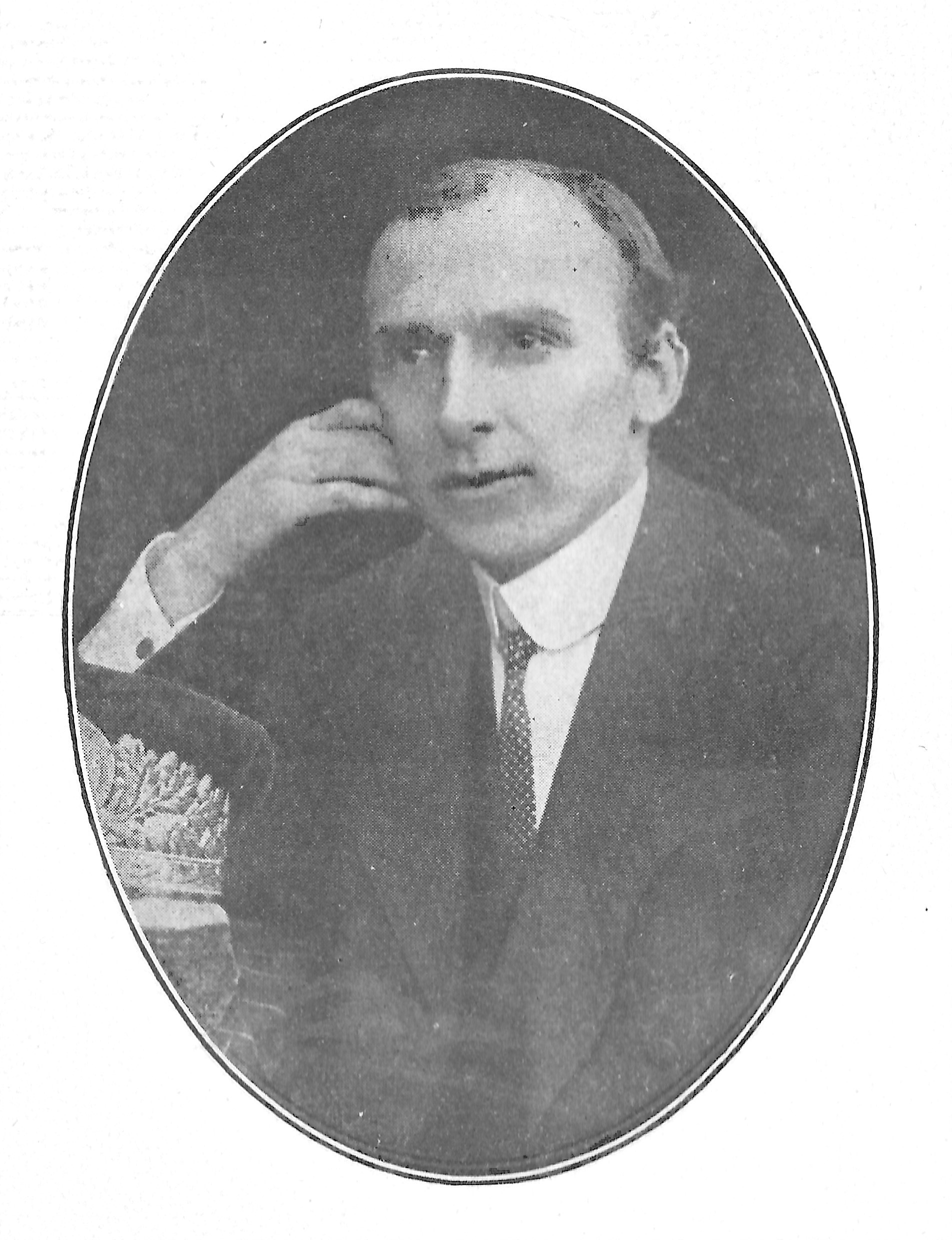
Hugh Emyr Davies (Emyr)

Hugh Emyr Davies (31 May 1878 – 21 November 1950) was a Welsh Presbyterian minister, and poet.

== Biography ==
His parents were Tudwal and Annie Davies of Abererch, Caernarfonshire. He received his early education at Pwllheli County School and Clynnog School. He later studied at UCW (Aberystwyth), and at Bala College. In 1909 he was ordained, and was appointed minister of Llanddona, Anglesey. In 1912 he moved to Lodge, Brymbo and Ffrith, before moving back to Anglesey, to Llanfechell, in 1920. After retirement he moved to live in Holyhead and in the Menai Bridge area. He died in 1950 in Llandegfan.

He was known as an excellent preacher, but was also regarded as an exceptional poet. He won a bardic chair at Pwllheli Eisteddfod at the age of 16, and subsequently won 22 bardic chairs.

His writings include the poem "Branwen ferch Llŷr" (which won him the crown at the Caernarfon National Eisteddfod in 1906, while he was still a student at Bala), and the poem "Owain Glyndŵr" (which won the crown at Llangollen in 1908).

In 1907 a collection of his works was published under the title 'Llwyn Hudol'.
