= W. R. H. Powell =

British politician (1819–1889)

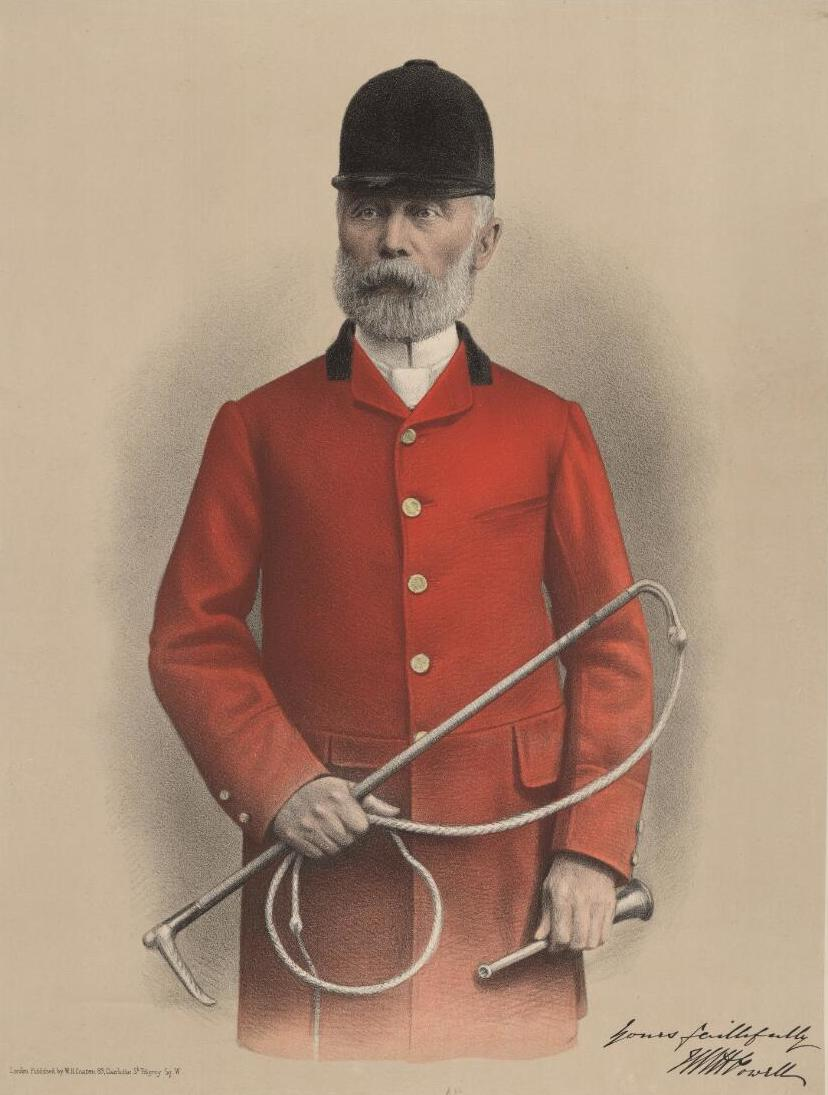
Portrait of W. R. H. Powell

Walter Rice Howell Powell (1819 – 26 June 1889) was a Welsh landowner and Liberal politician. He was Member of Parliament for Carmarthenshire from 1880 until 1885 and for West Carmarthenshire from 1885 until his death in 1889.

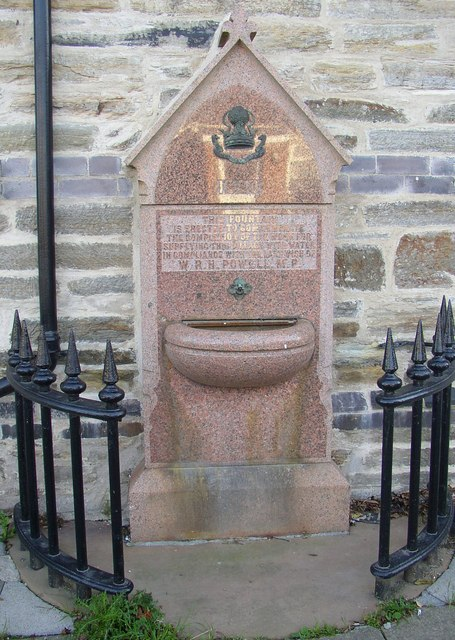
Powell is still remembered in Llanboidy by the drinking fountain inscribed "This fountain is erected to commemorate the completion of the work for supplying this village with water in compliance with the last wish of W. R. H. Powell M.P."

== Early life ==
Powell was the son of Walter Powell and his wife Mary Powell. He was educated at Christ Church, Oxford. On the death of his father in 1834 he inherited Maesgwynne estate of 3,468 acres (14.03 km^{2}) in the parish of Llanboidy, Carmarthenshire, which had been owned by the Howell family.

== Personal life ==
Powell married Mary Anne, daughter of Henry Skrine, of Warleigh Manor, Somerset. They had one daughter. Following her death he married the daughter of Grismond Phillips of Cwmgwilly, and they also had a daughter who married W.F. Roch of Butter Hill, Pembrokeshire.

== Powell and the Maesgwynne Estate ==
From an early age, Powell took an active interest in hunting, and is said to have spent much of his time at Oxford engaged in this pastime. For 50 years he was master of the foxhounds. He was a J.P. for Pembroke, Carmarthen and Cardiganshire and was High Sheriff of Carmarthenshire in 1849. In 1867 he funded a 24 piece brass band for Llanboidy.

He was responsible for building a new Market Hall in Llanboidy and also, during the 1870s, funded the restoration of the parish church.

== Political career ==
Powell was engaged in public life from an early age and was High Sheriff of Carmarthenshire in 1840. For many years he supported the Conservative Party but, as was noted at the time of his death, he "gave active support to men who could not be called genuine Conservatives, and he appears to have long cherished certain opinions of a democrative kind." This can be seen from his comments when nominating David Jones of Pantglas, the sitting member for Carmarthenshire, as a candidate at the General Election of 1857. Powell stated that partisan colours were no longer shown at election times and this, he believed "was an evidence that party feeling was dying out in the country". Later that year, when a by-election was held, Powell was a leading supporter of David Pugh, the Liberal-Conservative who represented Carmarthenshire in the House of Commons from 1857 until 1868. At the hustings at Llandeilo it was Powell who formally proposed Pugh.

Pugh's political views were often described as vague and ambiguous, and for that reason he was placed at a disadvantage at the 1868 General Election when opposed by candidates who held pronounced Conservative and radical Liberal political views. Powell emerged as Pugh's leading supporter and public advocate during the 1868 election, and Pugh later followed Powell into the Liberal ranks.

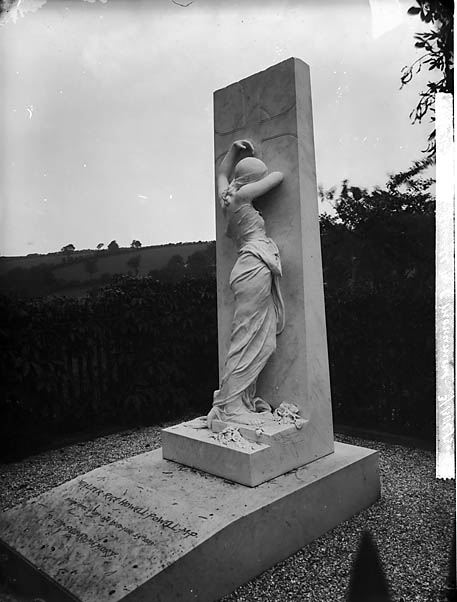
Monument to Walter Rice Howell Powell MP (1819-89) at Llanboidy NLW3361627

In 1874, Powell unsuccessfully contested Carmarthenshire as a Liberal candidate. Two years later he was briefly mentioned as a possible Liberal candidate for Carmarthen Boroughs following the resignation of Charles Nevill although there was no real prospect of him contesting this urban constituency.

Powell was elected Member of Parliament for Carmarthenshire in 1880 and when it was divided in 1885 he chose to contest the new West Carmarthenshire, which included his estate at Maesgwynne. The constituency was considered less favourable to the Liberals than neighbouring East Carmarthenshire which included a range of growing industrial communities. In addition, Powell was opposed by the other retiring member for Carmarthenshire, Viscount Emlyn. Powell proclaimed that he had a duty to the Liberal cause to oppose Emlyn. The overwhelmingly nonconformist character of the constituency was regarded as a distinct advantage to the Liberal candidate, and a combination of resentment of the established church (largely driven by such issues as the tithe and church rates) and the direct influence of the chapels was predicted to be decisive in attracting the votes of agricultural labourers. Nonconformist ministers were often claimed to have a disproportionate influence over electoral behaviour. (Note: Contemporary press reports of political meetings addressed by Powell provide evidence that nonconformist ministers played a leading role. "Cyfarfod ym Mhorthyrhyd". Baner ac Amserau Cymru. 7 November 1885.)

After a vigorous contest, Powell eventually won a decisive victory. Powell held the seat until his death in 1889.

In some quarters he was criticised for his relative silence in the House and lack of engagement with the great political issues of the day. Amongst the electors of West Carmarthenshire however, and especially after the extension of the franchise in 1884, he proved a very popular member who was regarded as being sympathetic with the views of those he represented.

== Notes ==
Parliament of the United Kingdom
Preceded by Viscount Emlyn; John Jones	Member of Parliament for Carmarthenshire; 1880 – 1885; With: Viscount Emlyn	Constituency divided See Carmarthenshire East and Carmarthenshire West
New constituency see Carmarthenshire constituency	Member of Parliament for Carmarthenshire West; 1885 – 1889	Succeeded by John Lloyd Morgan
