= John Lloyd Morgan =

British politician

John Lloyd Morgan

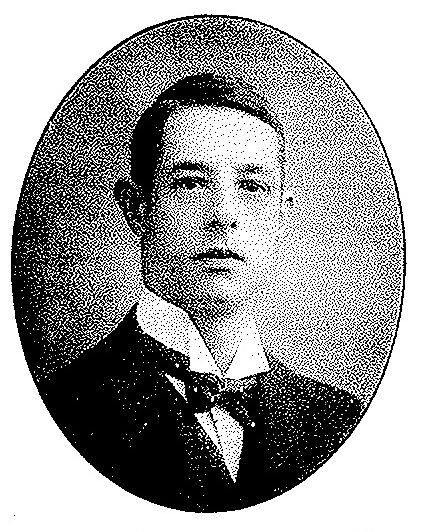
John Lloyd Morgan MP, circa 1906

John Lloyd Morgan (13 February 1861 – 17 May 1944) was Liberal Party Member of Parliament (MP) for West Carmarthenshire from 1889 to 1910, and a County Court judge.

== Background ==
He was the son of Rev. William Morgan, Professor of Theology at the Presbyterian College, Carmarthen. He was raised as an English speaking Congregationalist with little Welsh, and was educated at Tettenhall College, Staffordshire; Owens College, Manchester, and Trinity Hall, Cambridge (BA 1883).

== Legal career ==
Morgan qualified as a Barrister at the Inner Temple in 1884. Appointed a Kings Council in 1906, he became Recorder of Swansea, 1908–10 and was a County Court Judge at Carmarthen, from 1910 to 1926, when he retired.

== Political career ==
When the former Carmarthenshire constituency was divided in 1885 to establish Western and Eastern divisions it was expected that the Eastern division which contained emerging industrial communities would be the strongest for the Liberals. However, the sitting Liberal member, W.R.H. Powell chose to contest the Western division against the other sitting member, Lord Emlyn. Morgan was a contender for the nomination and addressed the inaugural meeting of the new Liberal association at Ammanford alongside David Pugh and Lewis Morris. However, Pugh was selected as candidate. At the election campaign a few months later, Morgan addressed a meeting at Water Street Chapel, Carmarthen, in favour of Powell. His speech aroused great enthusiasm and he was mentioned as a possible successor for Powell as Liberal candidate.

In the short term, however, it appeared that a new Liberal candidate would be required in East Carmarthenshire where there was mounting criticism of the octogenarian David Pugh. In April 1888, Morgan was named as a possible successor in an article written, in all probability, by J. Towyn Jones. At the annual meeting of the Liberal Association some months later there was further criticism of Pugh, with Lloyd Morgan being proposed as a possible replacement.

Following the death of the sitting member for West Carmarthenshire, W.R.H. Powell of Maesgwynne, in 1889, the Liberal Party in the constituency decided to move quickly in choosing a new candidate and there was a strong feeling that a nonconformist should be selected. In view of his local connections, John Lloyd Morgan had a strong advantage and was chosen unanimously following a selection conference at Carmarthen.

Morgan comfortably held the seat against a Unionist opponent. He was re-elected unopposed in 1892. In 1895 he again defeated a Unionist challenger, thereafter he was returned unopposed in 1900 and 1906. He defeated a Unionist challenger in January 1910. He retired from parliament before the December 1910 General Election to take up an appointment as a Judge. Following his appointment he was succeeded as MP by John Hinds. Hinds remained the member for the constituency until its abolition in 1918.

Morgan was frequently criticised for his apparent lack of interest in his constituency, but his local connections were deemed to be so strong as to make his position secure.

== Bibliography ==
- Who's Who

Parliament of the United Kingdom
Preceded by W. R. H. Powell	Member of Parliament for West Carmarthenshire; 1889 – December 1910	Succeeded by John Hinds
