= Frederick Campbell, 3rd Earl Cawdor =

British politician (1847–1911)

The Right Honourable The Earl Cawdor PC JP DL
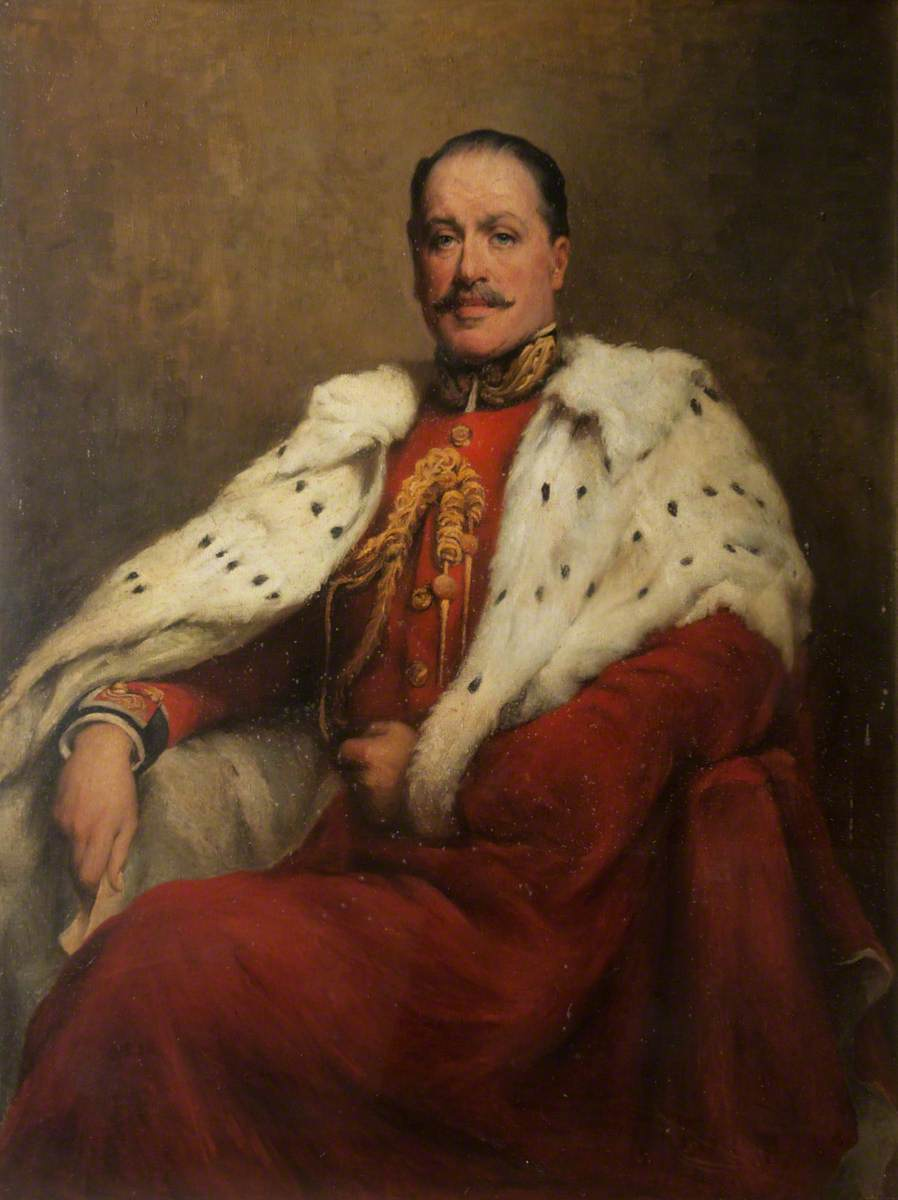

First Lord of the Admiralty
- In office 27 March 1905 – 4 December 1905
- Monarch: Edward VII
- Prime Minister: Arthur Balfour
- Preceded by: The Earl of Selborne
- Succeeded by: The Lord Tweedmouth

Personal details
- Born: 13 February 1847 Windsor, Berkshire
- Died: 8 February 1911 (aged 63) London
- Party: Conservative
- Spouse: Edith Turnor (1844–1926)
- Education: Christ Church, Oxford

Frederick Archibald Vaughan Campbell, 3rd Earl Cawdor, PC, JP, DL (13 February 1847 – 8 February 1911), styled Viscount Emlyn from 1860 to 1898, was a British Conservative politician. He served briefly as First Lord of the Admiralty between March and December 1905.

== Background and education ==
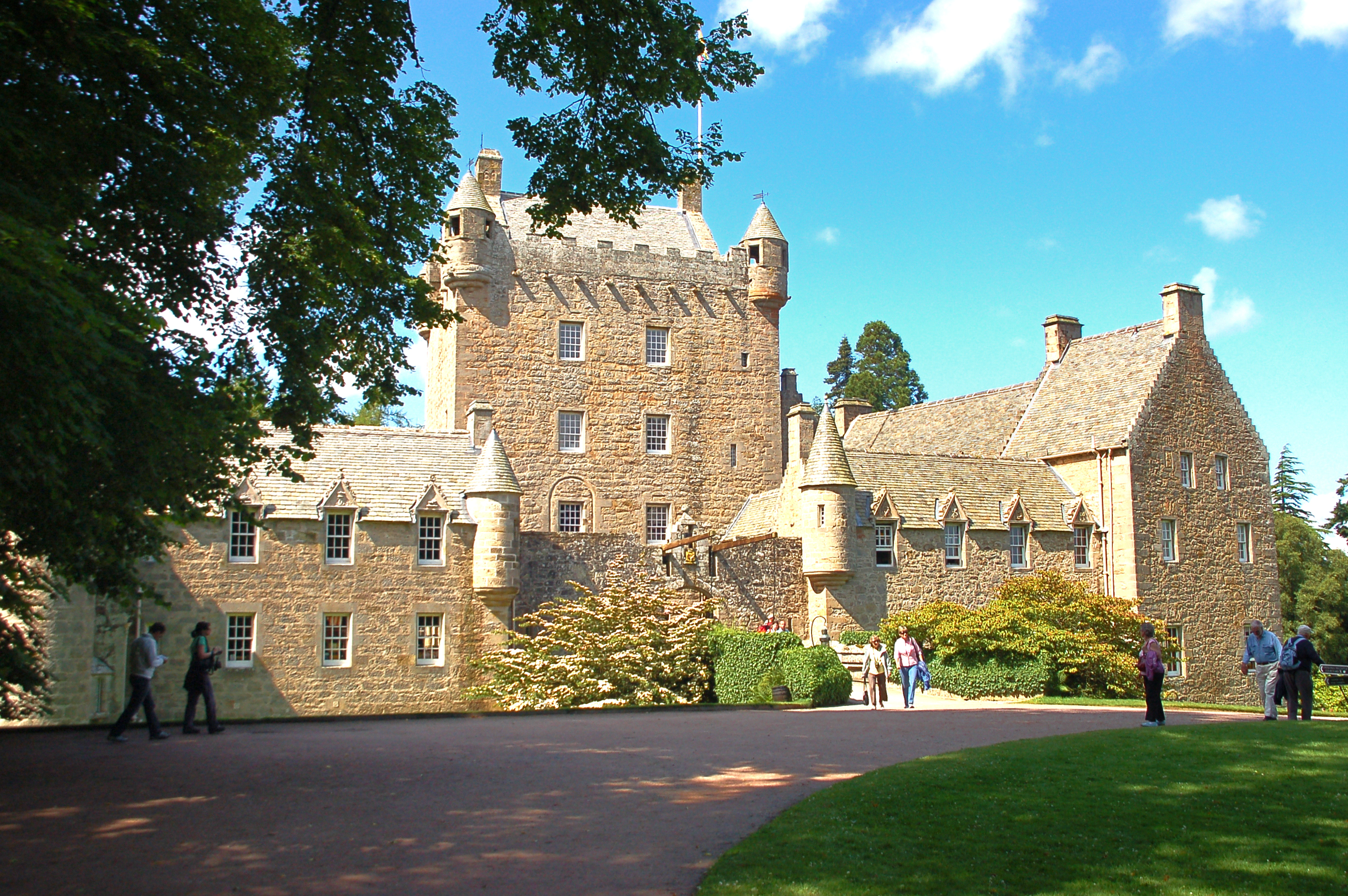
Cawdor Castle, Nairnshire, Scotland

Cawdor was the eldest son of John Campbell, 2nd Earl Cawdor and Sarah Cavendish, daughter of General Hon. Henry Cavendish, son of 1st Earl of Burlington and heiress Lady Elizabeth Compton. He was educated at Eton and Christ Church, Oxford. He was brought up on the family estates in south Wales and his coming of age in 1868 was a major event in the town of Llandeilo. In 1874 he was appointed to be Deputy Lieutenant for the county of Inverness.

By 1880s, his father's estate brought an annual income of £45,000 a year.

== MP for Carmarthenshire ==
Cawdor was Conservative Member of Parliament for Carmarthenshire from 1874 to 1885. In 1885 the constituency was divided in two and Emlyn decided to contest the new West Carmarthenshire constituency, although most of his family property lay in the eastern part of the county. His chances there appeared to be negligible given the growing industrial population which had been a key factor in the triumph of the Liberal candidate, Edward Sartoris at the 1868 General Election. Emlyn was opposed by the other sitting member, the Liberal W.R.H. Powell, himself a former Conservative supporter, who had first declared his support for the Liberals at the 1874 election. Powell now proclaimed that he had a duty to the Liberal cause to oppose Emlyn.

It was reported that the Conservatives were confident of their chances in West Carmarthenshire, on the grounds that it was largely an agricultural division. However, the electorate had more than doubled in the county, and the 1885 electorate in the Western Division alone exceeded that of the combined county seat in 1880. Powell's victory ended Emlyn's career in Carmarthenshire politics.

== Later political career ==
He succeeded in the earldom in 1898 and served briefly under Arthur Balfour as First Lord of the Admiralty. Lord Cawdor took a leading part in the Conservative opposition to Lloyd George's budget of 1909 and in drafting resolutions for the reform of the House of Lords in 1910. He also notably opposed the Housing, Town Planning, etc. Act 1909.

He was also involved in Pembrokeshire local affairs, and as Chairman of the Great Western Railway from 1895 to 1905 greatly improved the service. In 1903 he was described by Joseph Chamberlain as “the best chairman now living". In 1904 he was elected unopposed as a member of Pembrokeshire County Council to represent the Castlemartin ward.

Lord Cawdor was an officer in the Royal Carmarthen Artillery, a Militia unit, where he was lieutenant-colonel in command from 24 September 1892 until he retired on 5 November 1902. During these years he was promoted to colonel and appointed an aide-de-camp to King Edward VII.

== Family ==
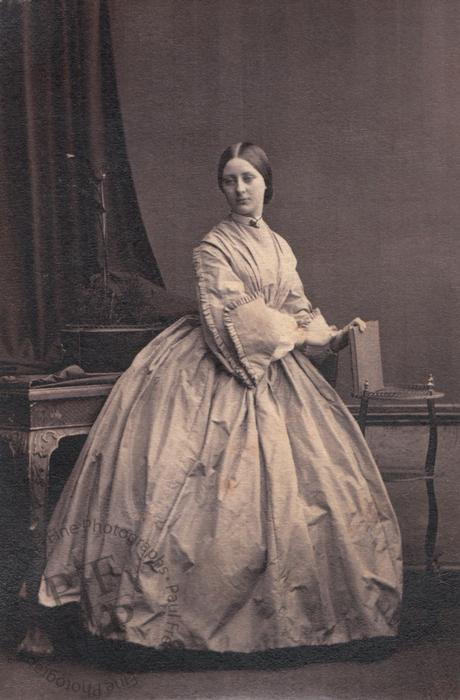
Edith Georgiana Turnor, Countess Cawdor

Lord Cawdor married Edith Georgiana Turnor, daughter of Christopher Turnor and Lady Caroline Finch-Hatton, daughter of 10th Earl of Winchilsea, on 16 September 1868 at Stoke Rochford Hall. They mostly lived in London at 74 South Audley Street. They had ten children:

1. Lady Edith Campbell m. Charles Ferguson
2. Hugh Campbell, 4th Earl Cawdor born at Cawdor Castle m. Joan Thynne, granddaughter of Lord John Thynne
3. Nigel Campbell m. Violet Kerr, great-granddaughter of William Kerr, 6th Marquess of Lothian
4. Lady Mabel Campbell m. Sir Henry Beresford-Peirse, 4th Baronet
5. Ralph Campbell m. Marjorie Theophila Fowler
6. Lady Lilian Campbell m. Richard Beresford-Peirse, son of 3rd Baronet
7. Elidor Campbell m. Violet Bulwer-Marsh
8. Ian Campbell m. Marion Stirling
9. Eric Campbell
10. Lady Muriel Campbell

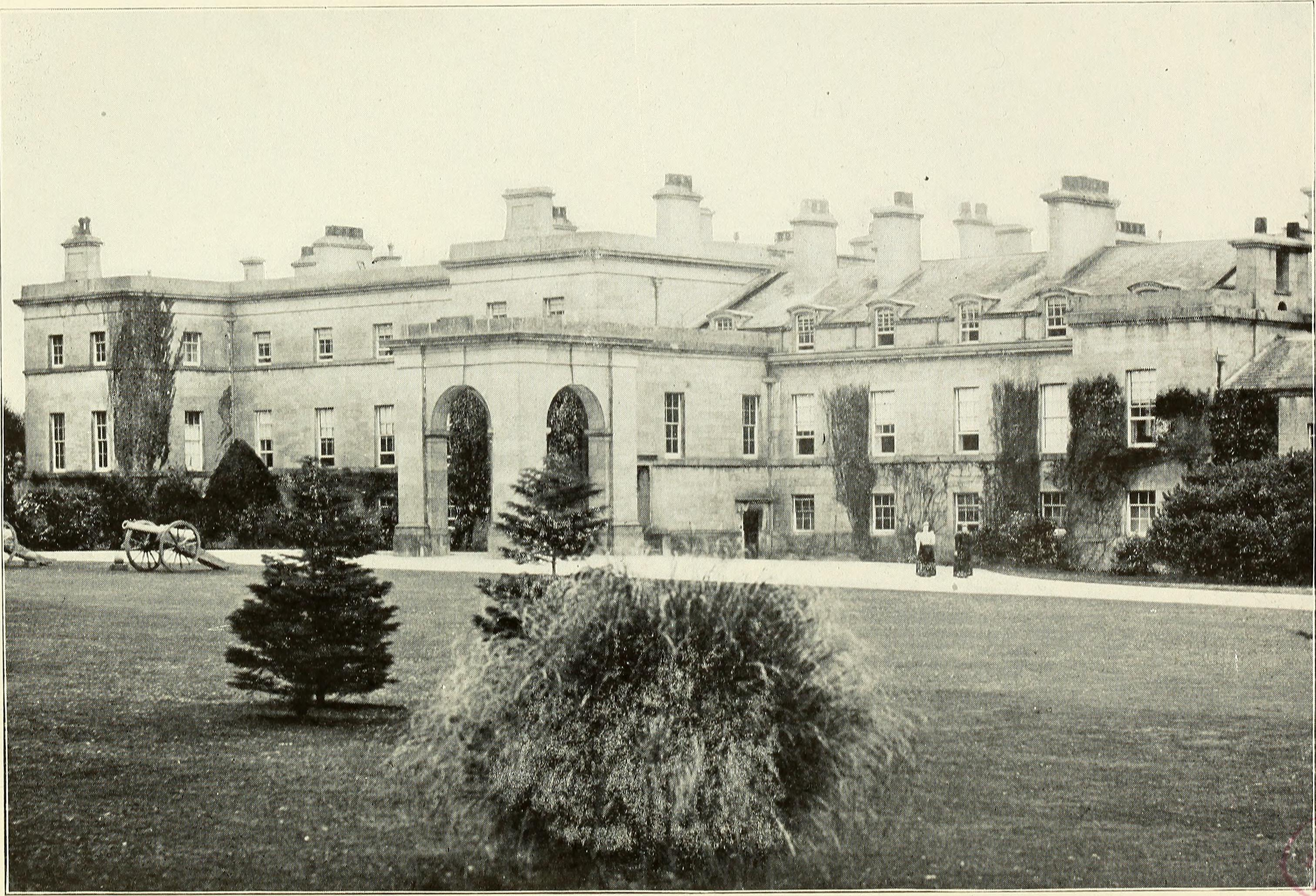
Stackpole Court, Pembrokeshire, Wales. The demolished mansion had 150 rooms.

They settled in Golden Grove, before moving to their larger seat Stackpole Court. The 1891 census recorded the family at Stackpole with 23 servants, and by 1901 it had increased to 25 servants.

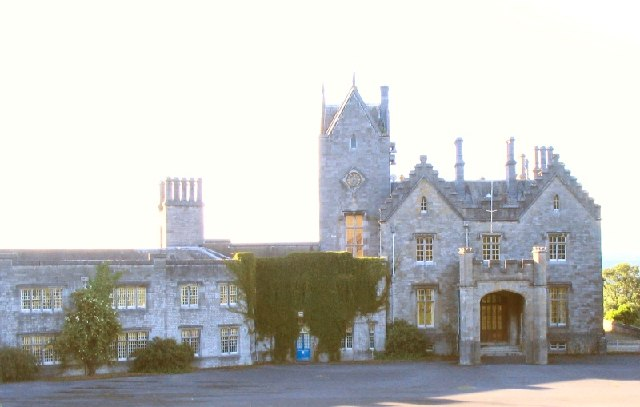
Golden Grove, Carmarthenshire, Wales

He died in February 1911, aged 63, and was succeeded in the earldom by his eldest son Hugh. Lady Cawdor died in 1926.

== Ancestry ==
Ancestors of Frederick Vaughan Campbell, 3rd Earl Cawdor,

8. John Campbell, 1st Baron Cawdor
4. John Campbell, 1st Earl Cawdor
9. Lady Isabella Caroline Howard
2. John Campbell, 2nd Earl Cawdor
10. Thomas Thynne, 2nd Marquess of Bath
5. Lady Elizabeth Thynne
11. Hon. Isabella Elizabeth Byng
Frederick Vaughan Campbell, 3rd Earl Cawdor,
12. George Cavendish, 1st Earl of Burlington
6. Hon. Henry Compton Cavendish
13. Lady Elizabeth Compton
3. Sarah Compton Cavendish
14. William Augustus Fawkener
7. Sarah Fawkener
15. Elizabeth Wright

== Sources ==
- Lee, Sidney, ed. (1912). "Campbell, Frederick Archibald Vaughan" . Dictionary of National Biography (2nd supplement). London: Smith, Elder & Co.
- Kidd, Charles, Williamson, David (editors). Debrett's Peerage and Baronetage (1990 edition). New York: St Martin's Press, 1990,
- Leigh Rayment's Peerage Pages
- Leigh Rayment's Historical List of MPs

Parliament of the United Kingdom
Preceded by Edward John Sartoris	Member of Parliament for Carmarthenshire; 1874 – 1885; With: John Jones 1874–1880; W. R. H. Powell 1880–1885	Constituency abolished
Political offices
Preceded by The Earl of Selborne	First Lord of the Admiralty; 1905	Succeeded by The Lord Tweedmouth
Honorary titles
Preceded by The Lord Kensington	Lord Lieutenant of Pembrokeshire; 1896–1911	Succeeded by The Lord St Davids
Peerage of the United Kingdom
Preceded by John Campbell	Earl Cawdor; 1898–1911	Succeeded by Hugh Frederick Campbell
