= Thomas Jones =

Thomas, Tom or Tommy Jones may refer to the following people:

== Arts and entertainment ==
- Thomas Jones (artist) (1742–1803), landscape painter in Italy and Britain
- Thomas Dow Jones (1811–1881), American sculptor, medallist
- T. H. Jones (Thomas Henry Jones, 1855–1929), South Australian organist and music teacher
- Thomas Hudson Jones (1892–1969), American sculptor
- T. Gwynn Jones (1871–1949), Welsh-language poet
- T. C. Jones (Thomas Craig Jones, 1920–1971), American female impersonator
- Tom Jones (writer) (1928–2023), American librettist and lyricist
- Tommy Lee Jones (born 1946), American film actor
- Thomas Jones (born 1980), birth name of American rapper Rapper Big Pooh
- Thomas Hewitt Jones (born 1984), British composer
- T. Llew Jones (Thomas Llewelyn Jones, 1915–2009), Welsh language author
- Thomas Hughes Jones (1895–1966), Welsh poet and writer
- T. Harri Jones (Thomas Henry Jones, 1921–1965), poet in Britain and Australia

== Business ==
- Thomas Roy Jones (1890–1985), American industrialist and management author
- Thomas V. Jones (1920–2014), American businessman
- Thomas W. Jones (born 1949), American businessman

== Civil service ==
- Thomas Mercer Jones (1795–1868), British-Canadian administrator
- Thomas Jones (civil servant) (1870–1955), British civil servant and educationalist
- T. K. Jones (1932–2015), American civil defense expert

== Law ==
- Thomas Jones (English judge) (1614–1692), British judge
- Thomas Jones (Maryland judge) (1735–1812), justice of the Maryland Court of Appeals
- Thomas A. Jones (1859–1937), associate justice of the Ohio Supreme Court
- Thomas R. Jones (judge) (1913–2006), justice of the New York Supreme Court
- Arrest of Thomas Jones, 2000 case involving the Philadelphia Police Department

== Military ==
- Thomas Jones (privateer) (died 1713), Irish privateer and emigrant to Rhode Island
- Thomas ap Catesby Jones (1790–1858), US Navy officer
- Thomas Jones, 7th Viscount Ranelagh (1812–1885), proponent of British volunteer force
- Thomas Alfred Jones (1880–1956), British recipient of the Victoria Cross
- Thomas Jones (Medal of Honor) (1820–1892), American Civil War sailor
- Thomas John Jones (1874–?), Welsh officer in the British merchant navy
- Thomas E. Jones (doctor) (1880–1958), African-American doctor and first lieutenant in the US Army

== Politics ==
- Thomas Jones (MP for Wallingford), 15th-century Member of Parliament for Wallingford
- Thomas Jones (died 1558 or 1559), MP for Carmarthenshire and Pembrokeshire
- Thomas Jones (MP for Hereford) (died 1628), MP for Hereford
- Thomas Jones (died 1711), MP for East Grinstead
- Thomas Jones (South Carolina mayor) (1742–1826), fifth intendent (mayor) of Charleston, South Carolina
- Thomas Tyrwhitt Jones (1765–1811), MP for Weymouth and Melcombe Regis
- Thomas McKissick Jones (died 1892), American politician from Tennessee
- Thomas L. Jones (1819–1887), American politician from Kentucky
- Thomas G. Jones (1844–1914), governor of Alabama
- Thomas Jones, Baron Maelor (1898–1984), British MP for Meirionnydd
- Thomas Llewellyn Jones (1872–1946), company director and Queensland politician
- Thomas Artemus Jones (1871–1943), Welsh judge, journalist, nationalist and politician
- Thomas Mardy Jones (1879–1970), British politician and miner
- Thomas B. Jones, early 20th-century American politician from Virginia
- Thomas H. W. Jones (1916–1995), American politician from Pennsylvania
- Tom Jones (Australian politician) (1924–2014), Australian politician
- Tom Jones (South Dakota politician) (born 1940), member of the South Dakota Senate
- Tom Jones (Kentucky politician) (1947–2025), member of the Kentucky House of Representatives
- Tom Jones (Alabama politician), member of the Alabama House of Representatives
- Tom Jones (Pennsylvania politician), member of the Pennsylvania House of Representatives

== Religion ==
- Thomas Jones (bishop) (c. 1550–1619), Anglican archbishop in Dublin
- Thomas Jones (priest) (died 1682), defender of Anglican Christianity
- Thomas Snell Jones (1754–1837), English-born Presbyterian minister in Scotland
- Thomas Jones of Denbigh (1756–1820), Methodist clergyman, hymnwriter
- Thomas Jones (missionary) (1810–1849), Christian missionary to the Khasi people, India
- Thomas Jones (minister) (1819–1882), Welsh Independent preacher
- Thomas Sherwood Jones (1872–1972), suffragan bishop of Hulme, Manchester, 1930–1945
- Tom Jones (bishop) (1903–1972), Australian bishop

== Science, mathematics, medicine and technology ==
- Thomas Jones (mathematician) (1756–1807), British mathematician and academic
- Thomas P. Jones (1774–1848), British-born American mechanical engineer and publisher
- Thomas Jones (optician) (1775–1852), British astronomical instrument maker and Fellow of the Royal Society
- Thomas Wharton Jones (1808–1891), ophthalmologist and physiologist
- Thomas Rymer Jones (1810–1880), British surgeon, academic and zoologist
- Thomas Rupert Jones (1819–1911), British geologist
- Thomas Gilbert Henry Jones (1895–1970), Australian organic chemist and academic
- T. Duckett Jones (1899–1954), American physician and cardiologist
- Tom Parry Jones (1935–2013), Welsh scientist, inventor and entrepreneur
- Thomas David Jones (born 1955), American astronaut

== Sports ==
=== American football ===
- Tom Jones (end) (c. 1909–????), American college football player
- Potsy Jones (Thomas Clinton Jones, 1909–1990)
- Tom Jones (coach) (c. 1924–2014), coach and college athletics administrator
- Tom Jones (gridiron football) (1931–1978), American and Canadian football player
- Tommy Jones (defensive back) (born 1971)
- Thomas Jones (American football) (born 1978)
- Tommy Jones (quarterback) (born 1979), American and Canadian football quarterback

=== Association football (soccer) ===
- Thomas Jones (footballer, born 1879) (1879–?), outside left (Small Heath)
- Thomas Jones (footballer, born 1884) (1884–1958), Welsh international football inside left (Nottingham Forest)
- Thomas Jones (footballer, born 1885) (1885–?), football centre forward and outside right (Everton, Birmingham City)
- Thomas Jones (footballer, born 1889) (1889–1923), English football goalkeeper (Grimsby Town)
- Tom Jones (footballer, born 1899) (1899–1978), Welsh footballer
- Tommy Jones (footballer, born 1907) (Thomas William Jones, 1907–1980), English footballer who played for Burnley, Blackpool and Grimsby Town
- Tommy Jones (footballer, born 1909) (Thomas John Jones, 1909–?), Welsh international footballer who played for Tranmere Rovers, Sheffield Wednesday, Manchester United and Watford
- Tom Jones (footballer, born 1916), English footballer, played for Little Hulton, Accrington Stanley, Oldham Athletic and Rochdale (Wartime)
- T. G. Jones (Thomas George Jones, 1917–2004), Welsh international football for Everton
- Tommy Jones (footballer, born 1930) (1930–2010), football centre half who played for Everton in the 1940s and 1950s
- Tom Jones (footballer, born 1964), English footballer
- Thomas Jones (footballer, born 1997), Chilean midfielder (Deportes Magallanes)

=== Athletics ===
- Thomas Jones (runner) (1916–1984), American marathon runner
- Tom Jones (shot putter), winner of the 1954 NCAA DI outdoor shot put championship
- Tom Jones (sprinter) (1944–2007), American sprinter, winner of the 1966 200 meters at the NCAA Division I Outdoor Track and Field Championships

=== Australian rules football ===
- Tom Jones (footballer, born 1904) (1904–1944)
- Carlyle Jones (a.k.a. Tom Jones, 1904–1951)
- Tom Jones (footballer, born 1930) (1930–2018)

=== Baseball ===
- Tom Jones (baseball) (1874–1923), American baseball player
- Tommy Jones (baseball) (Thomas M. Jones, 1954–2009), American baseball player, manager, coach and executive

=== Cricket ===
- Thomas Babington Jones (1851–1890), Welsh cricketer
- Tom Jones (Welsh cricketer) (1901–1935)
- Tom Jones (New Zealand cricketer) (born 2006)

=== Rugby union ===
- Thomas Jones (rugby union) (1895–1933), Welsh international rugby union player

=== Other sports ===
- Tom Jones (racing driver) (1943–2015), American racing driver
- Tom Jones (volleyball) (born 1956), Canadian volleyball player
- Tommy Jones (bowler) (born 1978), American professional bowler
- Thomas Jones (wrestler) (born 1982), British wrestler better known as "The UK Kid"

== Other people ==
- Thomas Jones (historian) (1732–1792), American Loyalist historian
- Thomas Jones (English publisher) (1791–1882), publisher, bookseller in London, convert to Judaism
- Thomas H. Jones (1806–?), African-American abolitionist
- Thomas Jones (civil engineer) (1809–1892), South Australian pioneer
- Thomas Jones (librarian) (1810–1875), librarian of Chetham's Library, Manchester, Britain
- Tom Jones (trade unionist) (1822–1916), British trade union activist
- Thomas Mason Jones (1833–1873), Irish journalist and political activist
- Thomas Jesse Jones (1873–1950), Welsh-American sociologist and educational administrator
- Thomas Jones (sailor) (1877–1967), British merchant sailor; able seaman and survivor of the Titanic
- Thomas E. Jones (university president) (1888–1973), president of Fisk University, U.S., 1926–1946
- Thomas F. Jones 1916–1981), American academic and university administrator
- T. Canby Jones (1921–2014), Quaker peace activist and professor
- Tom Jones Jr. (1925–2014), American Navajo code talker

== See also ==
- Thomas Baker-Jones (1862–1959), Welsh rugby player
- Thom Jones (1945–2016), American writer
