= 1901 in Wales =

- Centuries: 18th; 19th; 20th; 21st
- Decades: 1880s; 1890s; 1900s; 1910s; 1920s
- See also: List of years in Wales; Timeline of Welsh history 1901 in The United Kingdom Scotland Elsewhere

This article is about the particular significance of the year 1901 to Wales and its people.

== Incumbents ==
- Archdruid of the National Eisteddfod of Wales – Hwfa Môn
- Lord Lieutenant of Anglesey – Sir Richard Henry Williams-Bulkeley, 12th Baronet
- Lord Lieutenant of Brecknockshire – Joseph Bailey, 1st Baron Glanusk
- Lord Lieutenant of Caernarvonshire – John Ernest Greaves
- Lord Lieutenant of Cardiganshire – Herbert Davies-Evans
- Lord Lieutenant of Carmarthenshire – Sir James Williams-Drummond, 4th Baronet
- Lord Lieutenant of Denbighshire – William Cornwallis-West
- Lord Lieutenant of Flintshire – Hugh Robert Hughes
- Lord Lieutenant of Glamorgan – Robert Windsor-Clive, 1st Earl of Plymouth
- Lord Lieutenant of Merionethshire – W. R. M. Wynne
- Lord Lieutenant of Monmouthshire – Godfrey Morgan, 1st Viscount Tredegar*Lord Lieutenant of Montgomeryshire – Sir Herbert Williams-Wynn, 7th Baronet
- Lord Lieutenant of Pembrokeshire – Frederick Campbell, 3rd Earl Cawdor
- Lord Lieutenant of Radnorshire – Powlett Milbank
- Bishop of Bangor – Watkin Williams
- Bishop of Llandaff – Richard Lewis
- Bishop of St Asaph – A. G. Edwards (later Archbishop of Wales)
- Bishop of St Davids – John Owen

== Events ==
- January – Samuel Thomas Evans becomes the last QC appointed by Queen Victoria.
- 22 January – Albert Edward, Prince of Wales accedes to the throne as King Edward VII of the United Kingdom, following the death of Queen Victoria.
- 31 March – The 10-yearly Census of England and Wales is taken. The population of Wales is shown to have topped two million for the first time in history. Over 15% of the population speak Welsh as their sole language.
- 3 April – Frederick Rutherfoord Harris, MP for Monmouth Boroughs, is unseated for alleged electoral malpractice.
- 17 April – Mawddwy Railway passenger services are suspended "pending repairs"; goods services are also suspended between May and October.
- 7 May – In the by-election at Monmouth Boroughs, Joseph Lawrence becomes the new Conservative MP.
- 24 May – 81 miners are killed in an accident at Universal Colliery, Senghenydd.
- 10 September – Twelve miners are killed in a mining accident at Llanbradach Colliery in Glamorgan.
- 9 November
  - Prince George, Duke of Cornwall and York (later George V) and his wife Mary of Teck officially become Prince and Princess of Wales.
  - Shipping magnate Alfred Lewis Jones is awarded a knighthood.
- December – The Rhymney Railway opens Caerphilly railway works.
- Gomer Berry and William Ewart Berry co-found Advertising World.
- Samuel Walker Griffith helps draft the Australian constitution.
- Construction of Port Talbot Steelworks begins.
- Construction of the 156-room Grand Hotel at Llandudno, the largest in Wales at the time.

== Arts and literature ==
- Arthur Machen joins Frank Benson's travelling theatre company.

=== Awards ===
- National Eisteddfod of Wales – held in Merthyr Tydfil
  - Chair – Evan Rees, "Y Diwigiwr"
  - Crown – John Gwili Jenkins

=== New books ===
==== English language ====
- J. E. Morris – The Welsh Wars of Edward I
- The Dau Wynne – A Maid of Cymru

==== Welsh language ====
- Morris Williams (Nicander) – Damhegion Esop ar Gân (published posthumously)
- Owen Morgan Edwards (ed) – Gwaith Dafydd ab Gwilym (Cyfres y Fil)

== Sport ==
- Rugby Union
  - 9 February – Scotland beat Wales 18–8 at Inverleith, Edinburgh.
  - Pontypool RFC and Tenby United RFC are founded.

== Births ==
- 4 January – Lonza Bowdler, Wales international rugby player (died 1963)
- 18 February – Will Owen, politician (died 1981)
- 27 February – Iorwerth Peate, social anthropologist, poet and author, founder of the Welsh Folk Museum (died 1982)
- 4 March – Edward Prosser Rhys, journalist and poet (died 1945)
- 1 April – Tom Jones, cricketer (died 1935)
- 18 April – Mel Rosser, dual-code international rugby player (died 1988)
- 22 May – David Morgan Jenkins, rugby player (died 1968)
- 11 June – Jack Livesey, actor (died 1961 in the United States)
- 22 June – Naunton Wayne, actor (died 1970)
- 3 September – Alexander Tudor-Hart, doctor and political activist (died 1992)
- 10 September – Rowe Harding, Wales and British Lions rugby player (died 1991)
- 9 November – Rhys Davies, writer (died 1978)
- 10 December – Ivor Jones, rugby player (died 1982)
- 24 December – Hilary Marquand, economist and MP (died 1972)
- date unknown – Ivor R. Davies, Welsh-descended organist and composer (died 1970)

== Deaths ==
- 20 January – James Harvey Insole, English-born colliery proprietor, 79
- 7 February – Leonard Watkins, Wales international rugby union player, 41
- 21 February – John Deffett Francis, artist, 85
- 14 May – Fanny Price-Gwynne, polymath, 82
- June – Abel Jones (Bardd Crwst), balladeer, 71
- 1 June
  - John Viriamu Jones, scientist, 45
  - Morgan Albert Ellis, Welsh-American preacher (born 1832)
- 30 June – John Jones Griffiths
- 18 August – Evan James, rugby player, 32
- 26 August – Robert Ricketts Evans, executioner
- 5 September – Rhys Gwesyn Jones, minister and author, 75
- 15 September – John Richards (Isalaw), musician, 58
- 22 September – William Davies (Mynorydd), artist, 75
- 24 November – Evan Lewis, Dean of Bangor, 83
- 26 November – Robert Clayton, cricketer, 57
- 16 December – David Lewis, Archdeacon of Carmarthen, 62

== See also ==
- 1901 in Ireland
