= Tom Jones =

Tom Jones may refer to:

== People ==
The name or stage name of the following people:

=== Arts and entertainment ===
- Tom Jones (singer), stage name of Welsh singer born Thomas John Woodward (born 1940)
- Tom Jones (lyricist) (1928–2023), American librettist and lyricist
- Tom Jones (wrestler) (born 1982), British professional wrestler better known as "The UK Kid"
- Tom Jones (artist) (born 1964) Ho-Chunk artist, curator, and professor of photography

=== Politics ===
- Tom Jones (Alabama politician), member of the Alabama House of Representatives
- Tom Jones (Australian politician) (1924–2014), Australian politician
- Tom Jones (Kentucky politician) (1947–2025), member of the Kentucky House of Representatives
- Tom Jones (Pennsylvania politician), member of the Pennsylvania House of Representatives
- Tom Jones (South Dakota politician) (born 1940), member of the South Dakota Senate

=== Sports ===
==== American football ====
- Tom Jones (end) (c. 1909–????), American college football player
- Tom Jones (coach) (c. 1924–2014), American football coach and college athletics administrator
- Tom Jones (gridiron football) (1931–1978), American and Canadian football player

==== Association football (soccer) ====
- Tom Jones (footballer, born 1899) (1899–1978), Welsh footballer
- Tom Jones (footballer, born 1916), English footballer
- Tom Jones (footballer, born 1964), English footballer

==== Australian rules football ====
- Tom Jones (footballer, born 1904) (1904–1944), Australian rules footballer
- Carlyle Jones (1904–1951), Australian rules footballer called Tom Jones by some sources
- Tom Jones (footballer, born 1930) (1930–2018), Australian rules footballer

==== Other sports ====
- Tom Jones (baseball) (1874–1923), American baseball player
- Tom Jones (Welsh cricketer) (1901–1935), Welsh cricketer
- Tom Jones (New Zealand cricketer) (born 2006)
- Tom Jones (runner) (1916–1984), American Olympic runner
- Tom Jones (racing driver) (1943–2015), American racing driver
- Tom Jones (volleyball) (born 1956), Canadian volleyball player
- Tom Jones (shot putter), winner of the 1954 NCAA DI outdoor shot put championship
- Tom Jones (sprinter) (1944–2007), American sprinter, winner of the 1966 200 meters at the NCAA Division I Outdoor Track and Field Championships

=== Other fields ===
- Tom Jones (bishop) (1903–1972), Australian bishop
- Tom Jones (trade unionist) (1822–1916), British trade union activist
- Tom Jones Jr. (1925–2014), American Navajo code talker
- Tom Parry Jones (1935–2013), Welsh scientist, inventor and entrepreneur

== Other uses ==
- Tom Jones, protagonist of The History of Tom Jones, a Foundling, a 1749 novel by Henry Fielding whose title is often shortened to Tom Jones
  - Tom Jones (Philidor), a 1765 opera by Philidor based on Fielding's novel
  - Tom Jones (Edward German), a 1907 British comic opera by Edward German based on Fielding's novel
  - Tom Jones (1917 film), a British comedy film based on Fielding's novel
  - Tom Jones (1963 film), an Academy Award-winning film based on Fielding's novel
  - Tom Jones (2023 TV series), a 2023 miniseries adaptation of Fielding's novel
- Tom Jones (TV programme), a 1980–1981 television series starring the singer

== See also ==
- "The Ballad of Tom Jones", a 1998 song by Space and Cerys Matthews about the singer
- The History of Tom Jones: a Foundling (TV series), a 1997 BBC miniseries adaptation of Fielding's novel
- Thom Jones (1945–2016), American writer
- Thomas Jones (disambiguation)
- Tommy Jones (disambiguation)
- Tom Jonas (born 1991), Australian-rules footballer
