= Tommy Jones =

Tommy Jones may refer to:

- Tommy Jones (defensive back) (born 1971), American football player
- Tommy Jones (quarterback) (born 1979), American and Canadian football quarterback
- Tommy Jones (baseball) (1954–2009), American baseball player, manager, coach and executive
- Tommy Jones (bowler) (born 1978), American professional bowler
- Tommy Jones (footballer, born 1907) (1907–1980), English footballer
- Tommy Jones (footballer, born 1909) (1909–?), Welsh international footballer
- Tommy Jones (footballer, born 1930) (1930–2010), English footballer
- Tommy Lee Jones (born 1946), American film actor

== See also ==
- Thomas Jones (disambiguation)
- Tom Jones (disambiguation)
