= 1928 Georgia Tech Golden Tornado football team =

American college football season

1928 Georgia Tech Golden Tornado football
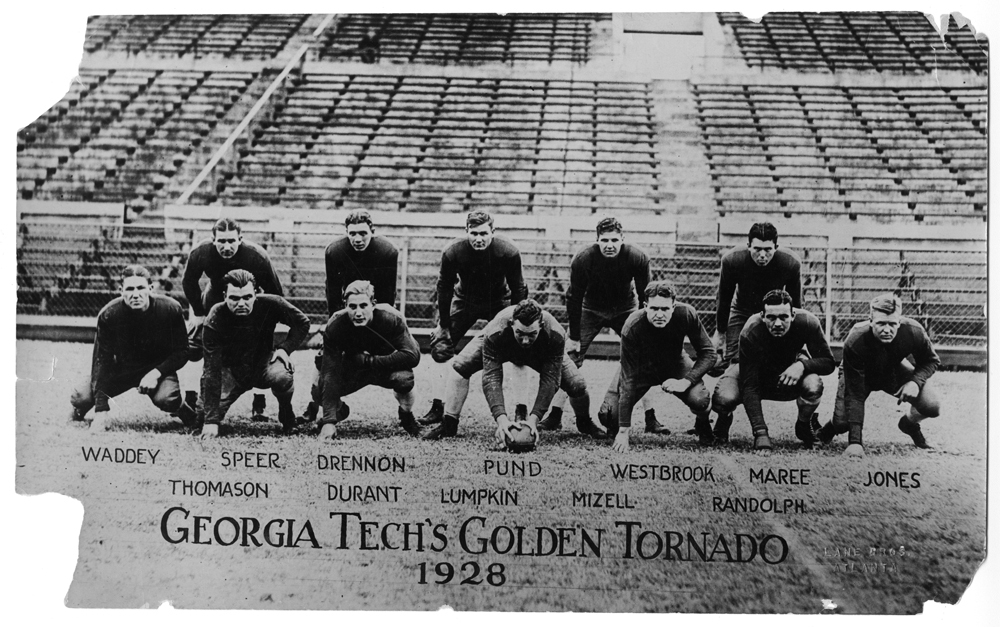

National champion (Boand, Helms, Houlgate, et al.) Co-national champion (Davis) SoCon champion Rose Bowl champion

Rose Bowl, W 8–7 vs. California
- Conference: Southern Conference
- Record: 10–0 (7–0 SoCon)
- Head coach: William Alexander (9th season)
- Offensive scheme: Jump shift
- Captain: Peter Pund
- Home stadium: Grant Field

1928 Southern Conference football standings
	Conf.					Overall
Team	W		L		T	W		L		T
No. 3 Georgia Tech $	7	–	0	–	0	10	–	0	–	0
Tennessee	6	–	0	–	1	9	–	0	–	1
Florida	6	–	1	–	0	8	–	1	–	0
VPI	4	–	1	–	0	7	–	2	–	0
Alabama	6	–	2	–	0	6	–	3	–	0
LSU	3	–	1	–	1	6	–	2	–	1
Clemson	4	–	2	–	0	8	–	3	–	0
Vanderbilt	4	–	2	–	0	8	–	2	–	0
Tulane	3	–	3	–	1	6	–	3	–	1
Ole Miss	3	–	3	–	0	5	–	4	–	0
North Carolina	2	–	2	–	2	5	–	3	–	2
Kentucky	2	–	2	–	1	4	–	3	–	1
South Carolina	2	–	2	–	1	6	–	2	–	2
Maryland	2	–	3	–	1	6	–	3	–	1
VMI	2	–	3	–	1	5	–	3	–	2
Georgia	2	–	4	–	0	4	–	5	–	0
NC State	1	–	3	–	1	4	–	5	–	1
Mississippi A&M	1	–	4	–	0	2	–	4	–	2
Virginia	1	–	6	–	0	2	–	6	–	1
Washington and Lee	1	–	6	–	0	2	–	8	–	0
Sewanee	0	–	5	–	0	2	–	7	–	0
Auburn	0	–	7	–	0	1	–	8	–	0
$ – Conference champion; Rankings from Dickinson System

The 1928 Georgia Tech Golden Tornado football team (Note: Although Georgia Tech's teams are officially known as the "Yellow Jackets", northern writers called the team the "Golden Tornado" in 1917; the name was commonly used until 1928 and for many years afterwards as an alternate nickname. It may have been coined by Morgan Blake.) represented the Georgia Institute of Technology (commonly known as Georgia Tech) during the 1928 Southern Conference football season. The team, which was a member of the Southern Conference (SoCon), was coached by William Alexander in his ninth year as head coach. Alexander compiled a record of 10–0 (7–0 SoCon) and outscored his opponents 213 to 40. Georgia Tech played its home games at Grant Field.

The team was selected national champion by Berryman, Billingsley, Boand, Football Research, Helms, Houlgate, NCF, Poling, and Sagarin (ELO-Chess), while Parke Davis named them co-champion as shared with Detroit. Additionally, USC also earned recognition under the Dickinson System. USC declined the 1929 Rose Bowl invitation, resulting in a matchup of California and Georgia Tech. The game was decided by a safety, which was scored after Cal's Roy "Wrong Way" Riegels ran 65 yards (59 m) in the wrong direction.

Several Georgia Tech players received postseason honors. Captain and center Peter Pund was a consensus All-American. Coach Knute Rockne said of Tech's 13–0 defeat of Notre Dame, "I sat at Grant Field and saw a magnificent Notre Dame team suddenly recoil before the furious pounding of one man–Peter Pund". Tackle Frank Speer was also selected as a first-team All-American by the Associated Press.

== Before the season ==
After the defeat of the Georgia Bulldogs' 1927 Dream and Wonder team, Georgia Tech returned all but one of its key players. (Note: 1927's captain Ed Crowley graduated and played baseball with the Washington Senators in 1928.) Alabama coach Wallace Wade said Georgia Tech, Georgia, and Vanderbilt had the best chances of winning a southern title. Georgia Tech head coach William Alexander held daily scrimmages.

The Golden Tornado was led by center and senior captain Peter Pund, who was never penalized, and was a key player on defense. Halfback Warner Mizell headed a powerful backfield that also included Stumpy Thomason and Father Lumpkin.

== Schedule ==
Date	Time	Opponent	Site	Result	Attendance	Source
October 6		VMI	Grant Field; Atlanta, GA	W 13–0	18,000	
October 13		at Tulane	Tulane Stadium; New Orleans, LA	W 12–0		
October 20		Notre Dame*	Grant Field; Atlanta, GA (rivalry)	W 13–0	35,000	
October 27	3:00 p.m.	at North Carolina	Kenan Memorial Stadium; Chapel Hill, NC	W 20–7	20,000	
November 3		Oglethorpe*	Grant Field; Atlanta, GA	W 32–7	8,000	
November 10		Vanderbilt	Grant Field; Atlanta, GA (rivalry)	W 19–7	30,000	
November 17		Alabama	Grant Field; Atlanta, GA (rivalry)	W 33–13	26,000	
November 29		Auburn	Grant Field; Atlanta, GA (rivalry)	W 51–0	20,000	
December 8	2:00 p.m.	Georgia	Grant Field; Atlanta, GA (rivalry)	W 20–6	40,000	
January 1, 1929		vs. California*	Rose Bowl; Pasadena, CA (Rose Bowl)	W 8–7	66,604	
*Non-conference game; Source:

== Game summaries ==
=== VMI ===
VMI at Georgia Tech

Team	1	2	3	4	Total
VMI	0	0	0	0	0
• Ga. Tech	0	6	7	6	19

- Date: October 6
- Location: Grant Field
  Atlanta, GA
- Game attendance: 18,000
- Referee: Foster (South Carolina)

Georgia Tech opened the season on October 6 with a 13–0 defeat of the VMI Keydets, in a game marred by fumbles in every quarter. Tech gained 307 yards and VMI 159. The Georgia Tech line "tore the V. M. I. line to shreds" and all members of the backfield played well. W. R. Tichenor was umpire. Georgia Tech's starting lineup was Holland (left end), Thrash (left tackle), Westbrook (left guard), Pund (center), Drennon (right guard), Speer (right tackle), Waddey (right end), Durant (quarterback), Mizell (left halfback), Thomason (right halfback), and Randolph (fullback).

=== Tulane ===
Georgia Tech at Tulane

Team	1	2	3	4	Total
• Ga. Tech	0	6	0	6	12
Tulane	0	0	0	0	0

- Date: October 14
- Location: Tulane Stadium
  New Orleans, LA

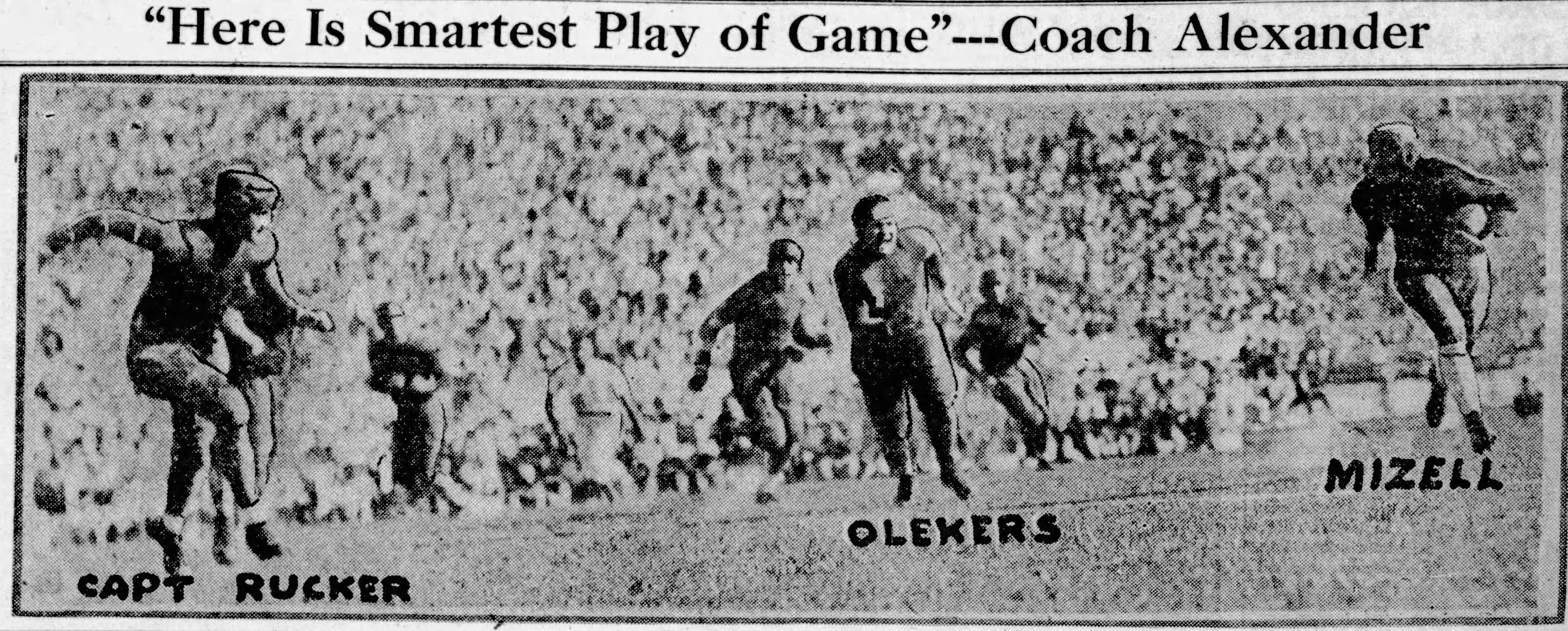
Mizell starts a run for first down after a punt fake

In the second week of play, Georgia Tech scored twice on forward passes to beat the Tulane Green Wave 12–0. The first one came in the second quarter; Warner Mizell threw a 25-yard (23 m) pass to Tom Jones. The second came in the fourth quarter on a pass from Dunlap to Stumpy Thomason. Georgia Tech started the second half of the game with a fierce drive down to the 1-yard (0.91 m) line when Randolph fumbled the ball away.

=== Notre Dame ===
Notre Dame at Georgia Tech

Team	1	2	3	4	Total
Notre Dame	0	0	0	0	0
• Ga. Tech	7	0	0	6	13

- Date: October 20
- Location: Grant Field
  Atlanta, GA
- Game attendance: 35,000

Georgia Tech next defeated coach Knute Rockne's Notre Dame Fighting Irish 13–0. Father Lumpkin intercepted two Irish passes, setting up the winning score by running the second interception down to the 3-yard (2.7 m) line. After the game, coach Rockne said, "I sat at Grant Field and saw a magnificent Notre Dame team suddenly recoil before the furious pounding of one man–Peter Pund ... Nobody could stop him. I counted 20 scoring plays that this man ruined". Rockne later also wrote of an attack on his coaching in the Atlanta Journal, "I am surprised that a paper of such fine, high standing [as yours] would allow a zipper to write in his particular vein ... the article by Fuzzy Woodruff was not called for".

Tech's backfield coach Don Miller was a former player of Rockne's, one of the "Four Horsemen". As coach Alexander explained, "Coach Miller knows the Notre Dame offense of Knute Rockne as well as any man alive. It's virtually the same offense that Kid Woodruff has at Georgia."

Georgia Tech's starting lineup was Holland (left end), Maree (left tackle), Westbrook (left guard), Pund (center), Drennon (right guard), Speer (right tackle), Waddey (right end), Durant (quarterback), Mizell (left halfback), Thomason (right halfback), and Randolph (fullback).

=== North Carolina ===
Georgia Tech at North Carolina

Team	1	2	3	4	Total
• Ga. Tech	6	14	0	0	20
UNC	0	0	0	7	7

- Date: October 27
- Location: Kenan Memorial Stadium
  Chapel Hill, NC
- Game start: 3:00 p. m.
- Game attendance: 20,000

The Golden Tornado then invaded North Carolina for the first time and beat the Tar Heels 20–7. Georgia Tech started the game with its second stringers, which seemed to perform sufficiently.

Four minutes into the game, Earl Dunlap hit Tom Jones with a 55-yard (50 m) touchdown pass. The next score came when Fitzgerald cut back on a 37-yard (34 m) touchdown run. The third was a short run Dunlap set up by a pass to Holland. In the second half, Tech made two first downs to ten for North Carolina. Georgia Tech's starting lineup was Jones (left end), Watkins (left tackle), Westbrook (left guard), Pund (center), Drennon (right guard), Speer (right tackle), Waddey (right end), Durant (quarterback), Mizell (left halfback), Thomason (right halfback), and Randolph (fullback).

=== Oglethorpe ===
Oglethorpe at Georgia Tech

Team	1	2	3	4	Total
Oglethorpe	0	7	0	0	7
• Ga. Tech	0	7	6	19	32

- Date: November 3
- Location: Grant Field
  Atlanta, GA
- Game attendance: 8,000
- Game weather: Rain
- Referee: Buck Cheves

Georgia Tech defeated the local Oglethorpe Stormy Petrels 32–7. Light rain kept the attendance at 8,000. After a 7–7 tie in the first half, the Petrels were smothered "under an avalanche of off tackle plays" in the second; their touchdown drive having used up all of their energy. Cy Bell was Oglethorpe's star.

Stumpy Thomason had multiple long gains. Tech gained 320 yards (290 m) to Oglethorpe's 62 yards (57 m). W. R. Tichenor was umpire. Georgia Tech's starting lineup was Jones (left end), Thrash (left tackle), Edwards (left guard), Pund (center), Brooke (right guard), Speer (right tackle), Waddey (right end), Durant (quarterback), Wilson (left halfback), Thomason (right halfback), and Randolph (fullback).

=== Vanderbilt ===
Vanderbilt at Georgia Tech

Team	1	2	3	4	Total
Vanderbilt	0	0	0	7	7
• Ga. Tech	0	7	6	6	19

- Date: November 10
- Location: Grant Field
  Atlanta, GA
- Game attendance: 30,000
- Referee: Gardner (Illinois)

Georgia Tech ended the Jimmy Armistead-led Vanderbilt Commodores' hopes of a southern title with a 19–7 victory. The ground-gaining of Thomason, Lumpkin, and Mizell carried Georgia Tech.

Georgia Tech's first touchdown came on a 45-yard (41 m) pass from Tom Jones to Warner Mizell on a triple pass play. Georgia Tech's next score came on an end run from Mizell. Vanderbilt's lone score came on an 85-yard (78 m) run by lineman Bull Brown after picking up a Stumpy Thomason fumble. The last score was a short run by Lumpkin. W. R. Tichenor was field judge. Georgia Tech's starting lineup was Jones (left end), Maree (left tackle), Westbrook (left guard), Pund (center), Drennon (right guard), Speer (right tackle), Waddey (right end), Schulman (quarterback), Mizell (left halfback), Lumpkin (right halfback), and Randolph (fullback).

=== Alabama ===
Alabama at Georgia Tech

Team	1	2	3	4	Total
Alabama	0	13	0	0	13
• Ga. Tech	6	7	0	20	33

- Date: November 17
- Location: Grant Field
  Atlanta, GA
- Game attendance: 26,000

Tech defeated coach Wallace Wade's Alabama Crimson Tide 33–13, scoring three times in the final period to break a 13–13 tie at the half. Coach Alexander gave his team a fiery halftime speech, drawing up defensive plays.

Warner Mizell scored first when he went back to punt, but fumbled the snap, and picked it up and ran it 75 yards (69 m). In the fourth quarter, Alabama drove to Tech's 32-yard (29 m) line when Tony Holm, who had been playing his greatest game, suffered a fractured rib. Georgia Tech took over and the deadlock was eventually broken when Stumpy Thomason ran 46 yards (42 m). Later, Mizell passed to Thomason for another touchdown. The final score came on an interception from Bob Durant returned 55 yards (50 m).

Georgia Tech's starting lineup was Jones (left end), Maree (left tackle), Westbrook (left guard), Pund (center), Drennon (right guard), Speer (right tackle), Waddey (right end), Durant (quarterback), Mizell (left halfback), Thomason (right halfback), and Randolph (fullback).

=== Auburn ===
Prior to the rivalry game with Auburn, Mizell was stricken with the flu. Tech still won 51–0. Georgia Tech's starting lineup was Jones (left end), Maree (left tackle), Westbrook (left guard), Pund (center), Drennon (right guard), Watkins (right tackle), Waddey (right end), Schulman (quarterback), Fiasst (left halfback), Lumpkin (right halfback), and Randolph (fullback).

=== Georgia ===
Georgia at Georgia Tech

Team	1	2	3	4	Total
Georgia	6	0	0	0	6
• Ga. Tech	0	7	13	0	20

- Date: December 8
- Location: Grant Field
  Atlanta, GA
- Game start: 2:00 p. m.
- Game attendance: 40,000
- Referee: Gardner (Cornell)

In the final game of the regular season, Georgia Tech defeated the rival Georgia Bulldogs 20–6. In the third period, Stumpy Thomason twisted for a 42-yard (38 m) run after an exchange of punts. Lumpkin ran through the line for 15 yards (14 m) and the ensuing touchdown to lead 14–6.

The same week, the Tennessee Volunteers upset the high-scoring Florida Gators to give Georgia Tech the only claim to the southern championship. Georgia Tech's starting lineup was Jones (left end), Watkins (left tackle), Westbrook (left guard), Pund (center), Drennon (right guard), Thrash (right tackle), Waddey (right end), Durant (quarterback), Mizell (left halfback), Thomason (right halfback), and Lumpkin (fullback).

== Post-season ==
=== California ===
Rose Bowl

Team	1	2	3	4	Total
• Ga. Tech	0	2	6	0	8
Cal	0	0	0	7	7

- Date: January 1, 1929
- Location: Rose Bowl
  Pasadena, CA
- Game attendance: 66,604
- Referee: C. W. Streit

Under the Dickinson System, USC was recognized as #1 but the 1929 Rose Bowl was contested between the #2 and #3 teams, California and Georgia Tech. The game was decided by a safety scored after California center Roy "Wrong Way" Riegels ran 65 yards (59 m) in the wrong direction, having picked up a fumble by Stumpy Thomason.

Roy Riegels' wrong-way run.

Thirty yards (27 m) from Tech's end zone, Riegels was turned around and ran many yards in the wrong direction. Riegels told the Associated Press, "I was running toward the sidelines when I picked up the ball ... I started to turn to my left toward Tech's goal. Somebody shoved me and I bounded right off into a tackler. In pivoting to get away from him, I completely lost my bearings." Teammate and quarterback Benny Lom chased Riegels, screaming at him to stop. Known for his speed, Lom finally caught up with Riegels at California's 3-yard (2.7 m) line and tried to turn him around, but he was immediately rushed by a wave of Georgia Tech players, and tackled by Frank Waddey and Vance Maree at the 1-yard (0.91 m) line. The Bears chose to punt rather than risk a play so close to their own end zone, but Maree blocked Lom's punt for a safety, giving Tech a 2–0 lead.

External videos
- Riegels' wrong way run, YouTube video.

During Roy's wrong-way run, coach Alexander told his excited players, who were jumping near the team's bench; "Sit down. Sit down. He's just running the wrong way. Every step he takes is to our advantage". Broadcaster Graham McNamee, who was commentating the game on radio, said during Riegels' run; "What am I seeing? What's wrong with me? Am I crazy? Am I crazy? Am I crazy?"

After the play, Riegels was so distraught he had to be persuaded to return to the game for the second half by his head coach Nibs Price. Riegels said, "Coach, I can't do it. I've ruined you, I've ruined myself, I've ruined the University of California. I couldn't face that crowd to save my life." Coach Price responded by saying "Roy, get up and go back out there—the game is only half over". Riegels did play on; he turned in a strong second-half performance, including blocking a Georgia Tech punt. Lom passed for a touchdown and kicked the extra point, but that was not enough. Georgia Tech won the game and its second national championship 8–7. Its starting lineup was Waddey (left end), Speer (left tackle), Drennon (left guard), Pund (center), Westbrook (right guard), Maree (right tackle), Jones (right end), Durant (quarterback), Thomason (left halfback), Mizell (right halfback), and Lumpkin (fullback).

=== Awards and honors ===
==== Individual ====
Several Georgia Tech players received post-season honors. Tackle Frank Speer was selected as a first-team All-American by the Associated Press. Center Peter Pund was recognized as a consensus All-American. Halfback Warner Mizell was a second-team All-American and first-team All-Southern. Ends Tom Jones and Frank Waddey, tackle Vance Maree, and guard Raleigh Drennon were also placed on All-Southern teams. Coach Alexander called Drennon "the best all around guard that ever put a cleat into Grant Field."

==== National champions ====
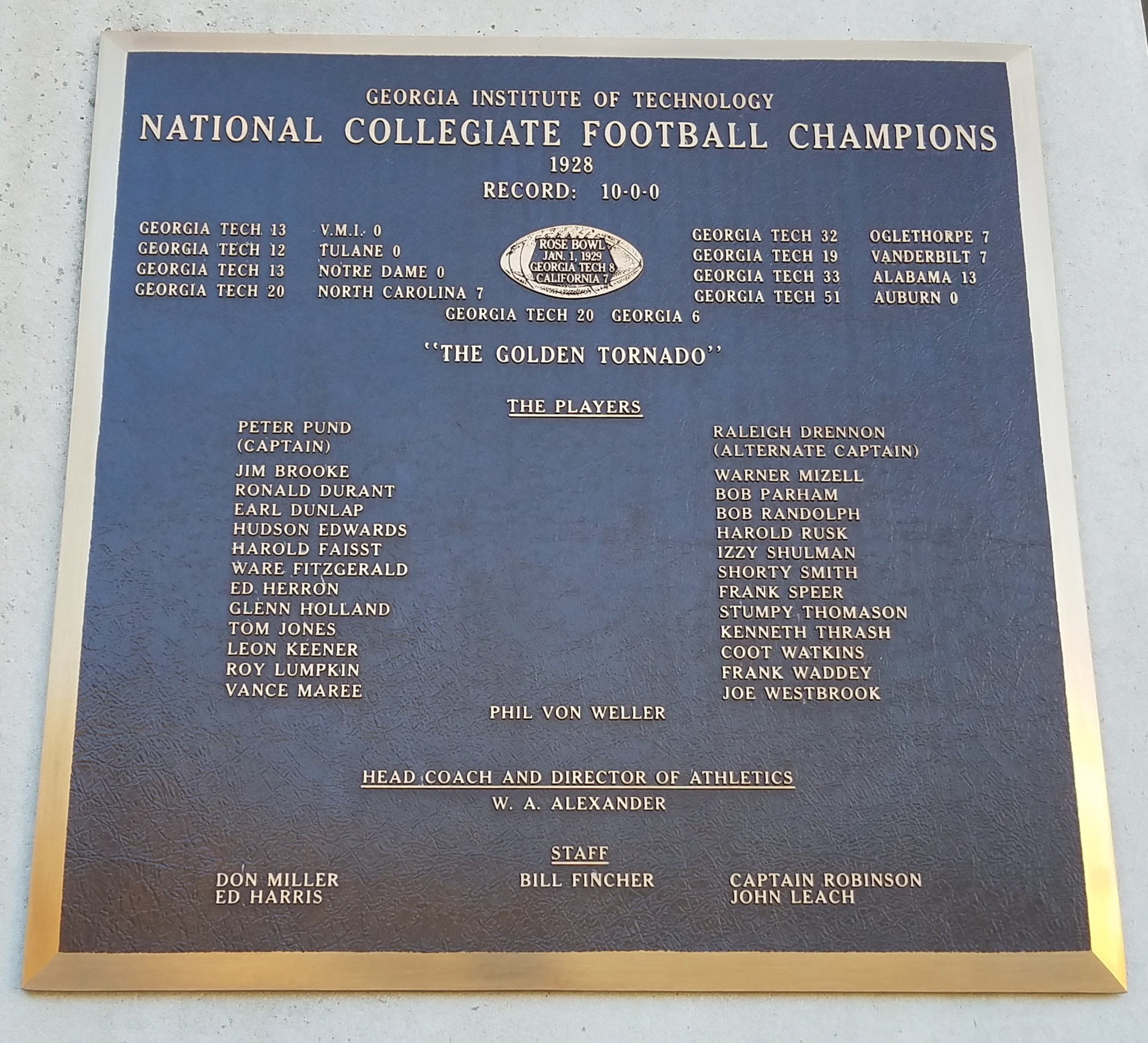
Plaque at Georgia Tech honoring their National Championship season

Both USC and Georgia Tech claimed national championships for 1928. Georgia Tech was retroactively selected as the national champion by the Berryman QPRS system, Billingsley Report, Boand System, College Football Researchers Association, Helms Athletic Foundation, Houlgate System, National Championship Foundation, Poling System, and Jeff Sagarin's ELO-Chess methodology system, and as a co-national champion by Parke H. Davis. In honor of the Rose Bowl victory, Stumpy Thomason was given a bear cub by a local businessman. He grew attached to it, would drive it around town, and feed it Coca-Cola.

== Personnel ==
=== Depth chart ===
The following chart depicts Tech's lineup during the 1928 season with games started at the position shown in parentheses. The chart mimics the offense after the jump shift has taken place.

LE
Tom Jones (7)
Glenn Holland (2)
Frank Waddey (1)
Slick Keener (0)

LT	LG	C	RG	RT
Vance Maree (4)	Joe Westbrook (7)	Peter Pund (9)	Raleigh Drennon (7)	Frank Speer (6)
Ken Thrash (2)	Raleigh Drennon (1)	Fatty Cain (0)	Jim Brooks (1)	Vance Maree (1)
Coot Watkins (2)	Hudson Edwards (1)	Hobby Law (0)	Joe Westbrook (1)	Ken Thrash (1)
Frank Speer (1)	Jack Holt (0)	Geo. Muse (0)	Joe Kent (0)	Coot Watkins (1)

RE
Frank Waddey (8)
Tom Jones (1)
Ed Herron (0)
Phil Von Weller (0)

QB
Bob Durant (7)
Izzy Schulman (2)

RHB
Stumpy Thomason (6)
Father Lumpkin (2)
Warner Mizell (1)
Shorty Smith (0)
Fite Fitzgerald (0)

FB
Bob Randolph (7)
Father Lumpkin (2)

LHB
Warner Mizell (7)
Sleepy Faisst (1)
Stumpy Thomason (1)
Wilson (1)
Earl Dunlap (0)
Russ Russell (0)

=== Lettermen ===
==== Line ====
Number	Player	Position	Games started	Hometown	Prep school	Height	Weight	Age
72	Jim Brooke	Guard	1	Columbus, Georgia		5'11"	180	18
10	Raleigh Drennon	Guard	8	Atlanta, Georgia		5'10"	187	21
42	Hudson Edwards	Guard	1	Atlanta, Georgia		6'0"	181	18
4	Ed Herron	End		Chattanooga, Tennessee		5'10"	170	19
2	Glenn Holland	End	2	Atlanta, Georgia		5'11"	170	20
5	Tom Jones	End	8	Clarkesville, Georgia		5'11"	175	19
61	Slick Keener	End		Gadsden, Alabama		5'10"	181	21
38	Vance Maree	Tackle	4	Savannah, Georgia		6'1"	191	19
15	Peter Pund	Center	9	Augusta, Georgia	Richmond Academy	6'0"	182	21
78	Seedy Rusk	Center		Atlanta, Georgia		6'0"	179	21
48	Frank Speer	Tackle	7	Atlanta, Georgia		6'0"	204	20
80	Ken Thrash	Tackle	3	Orlando, Florida		5'10"	190	22
22	Phil Von Weller	End		Albany, Georgia		6'0"	178	20
26	Coot Watkins	Tackle	3	Atlanta, Georgia		6'0"	199	20
70	Frank Waddey	End	9	Memphis, Tennessee		5'10"	184	23
6	Joe Westbrook	Guard	8	Moultrie, Georgia		5'11"	180	23

==== Backfield ====
Number	Player	Position	Games started	Hometown	Prep school	Height	Weight	Age
84	Earl Dunlap	Halfback		Sumter, South Carolina		5'10"	177	18
22	Bob Durant	Quarterback	7	Bluefield, West Virginia		5'9"	161	20
7	Sleepy Faisst	Halfback	1	Little Rock, Arkansas		5'10"	160	20
18	Fite Fitzgerald	Halfback		Jackson, Tennessee		5'10"	164	20
59	Father Lumpkin	Fullback	4	Dallas, Texas	Oak Cliff High	6'1"	176	19
67	Warner Mizell	Halfback	8	Atlanta, Georgia	Miami Senior High	5'10"	170	20
63	Bob Parham	Halfback		Atlanta, Georgia		6'1"	176	21
24	Bob Randolph	Fullback	8	Atlanta, Georgia		5'10"	176	21
28	Izzy Shulman	Quarterback, halfback	2	Jackson, Tennessee		5'8"	155	20
37	Shorty Smith	Halfback		Cartersville, Georgia		5'7"	153	21
71	Stumpy Thomason	Halfback	7	Atlanta, Georgia		5'8"	174	20

=== Substitutes ===
==== Line ====
Number	Player	Position	Hometown	Prep school	Height	Weight	Age
62	Fatty Cain	Center	Savannah, Georgia		5'9"	183	18
65	Jack Holt	Tackle	Little Rock, Arkansas		6'1"	188	20
	Joe Kent	Guard	Moultrie, Georgia		5'10"	181	21
1	Hobby Law	Center	Chattanooga, Tennessee		5'9"	173	19
81	Geo Muse	Center	Covington, Kentucky		5'10"	178	19

==== Backfield ====
Number	Player	Position	Hometown	Prep school	Height	Weight	Age
53	Jimmie Frink	Halfback	Miami, Florida		5'10"	162	19
	Bob Horn	Halfback	Norfolk, Virginia		5'10"	178	21
54	Sol Luna	Halfback	Pittsburg, Tennessee		5'8"	163	20
8	Russ Russell	Halfback	New York, New York		5'10"	160	19
	Bob Strickland	Halfback	Sumter, South Carolina		5'10"	174	19

=== Coaching staff ===
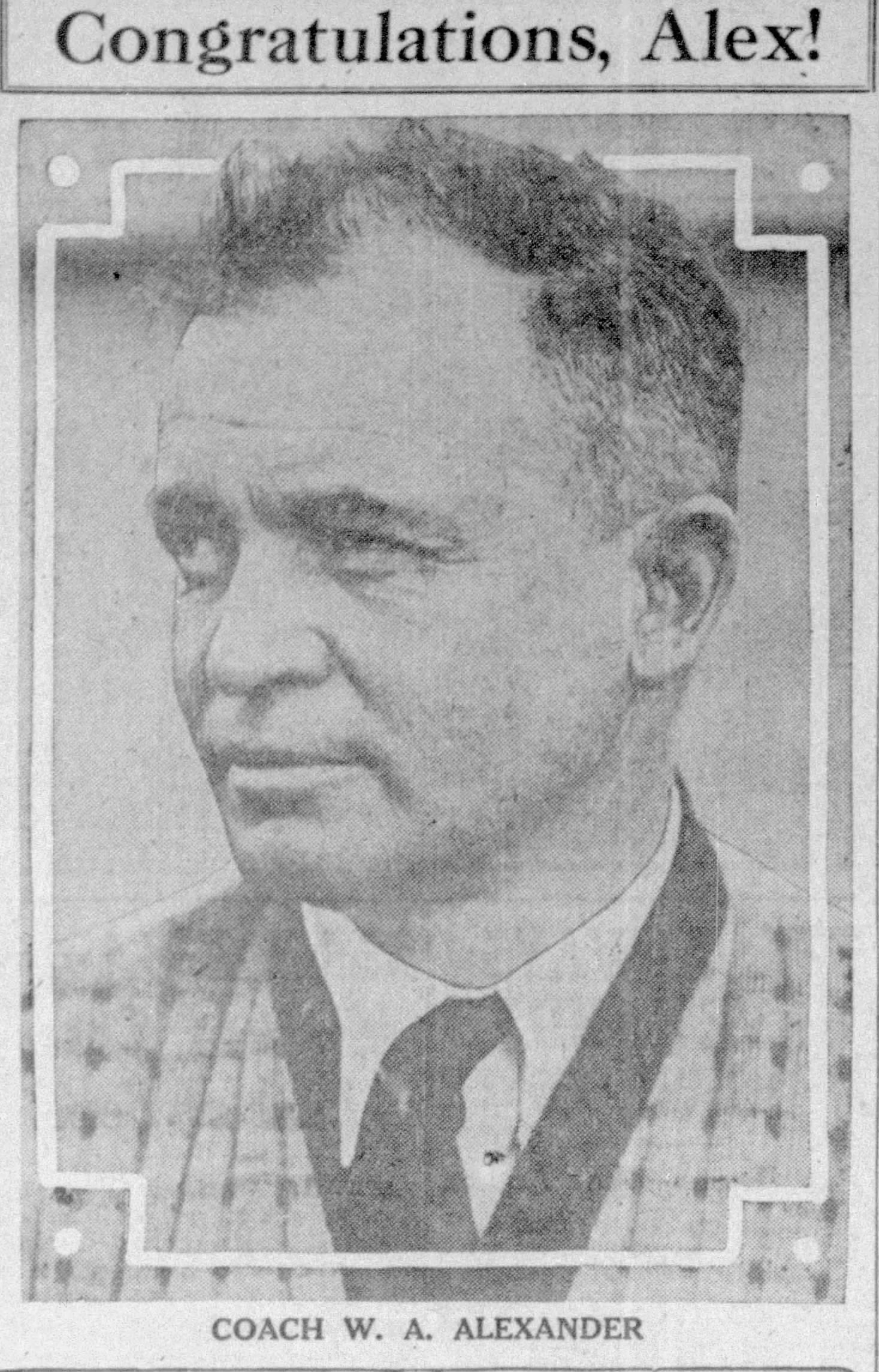
Coach Alexander in 1928

- Head coach: William Alexander
- Backfield coach: Don Miller
- Line coach: Bill Fincher
- End coach: Captain Robinson
- Managers: L. J. Harris, L. R. Leach

== See also ==
- 1928 Southern Conference football season
- 1928 College Football All-Southern Team
- 1928 College Football All-America Team
