= Frank Speer =

American football player and wrestler (1907–1938)

- Speer c. 1929

No. 48, 12, 17
- Position: Tackle

Personal information
- Born: May 27, 1907; Atlanta, Georgia, U.S.
- Died: June 10, 1938 (aged 31); Atlanta, Georgia, U.S.
- Listed height: 6 ft 0 in (1.83 m)
- Listed weight: 205 lb (93 kg)

Career information
- College: Georgia Tech (1927-28; 1930)

Awards and highlights
- National champion (1928); SoCon champion (1927, 1928); First-team All-American (1928); All-Southern (1927, 1928); Georgia Tech Athletics Hall of Fame; Tech All-Era Team (William Alexander Era)

Frank R. Speer (May 27, 1907 – June 10, 1938) was an American college football player and wrestler.

== College football ==
Speer was an All-American tackle for the Georgia Tech Yellow Jackets of the Georgia Institute of Technology; part of its national championship team of 1928. He first made the All-Southern team as a sophomore in 1927. One writer in 1930 said Vance Maree and Frank Speer had the reputation as "the toughest pair of tackles in the south." Speer is a member of the Georgia Tech Athletics Hall of Fame.

== Wrestling ==
Speer once lost in a wrestling match with Bronko Nagurski due to a kneeing foul. In another wrestling match, he caused former World Heavyweight Champion Jack Dempsey, who was officiating the contest, to knock him out.

On June 1, 1938, Speer became ill but still participated in a wrestling match with Dorv Roche at Atlanta's Warren Arena. Following the match, he developed a fever and was taken to a hospital, where he died June 10 of bronchial pneumonia.

== See also ==
- List of gridiron football players who became professional wrestlers
