= Vance Maree =

American football and basketball player (1909–1976)

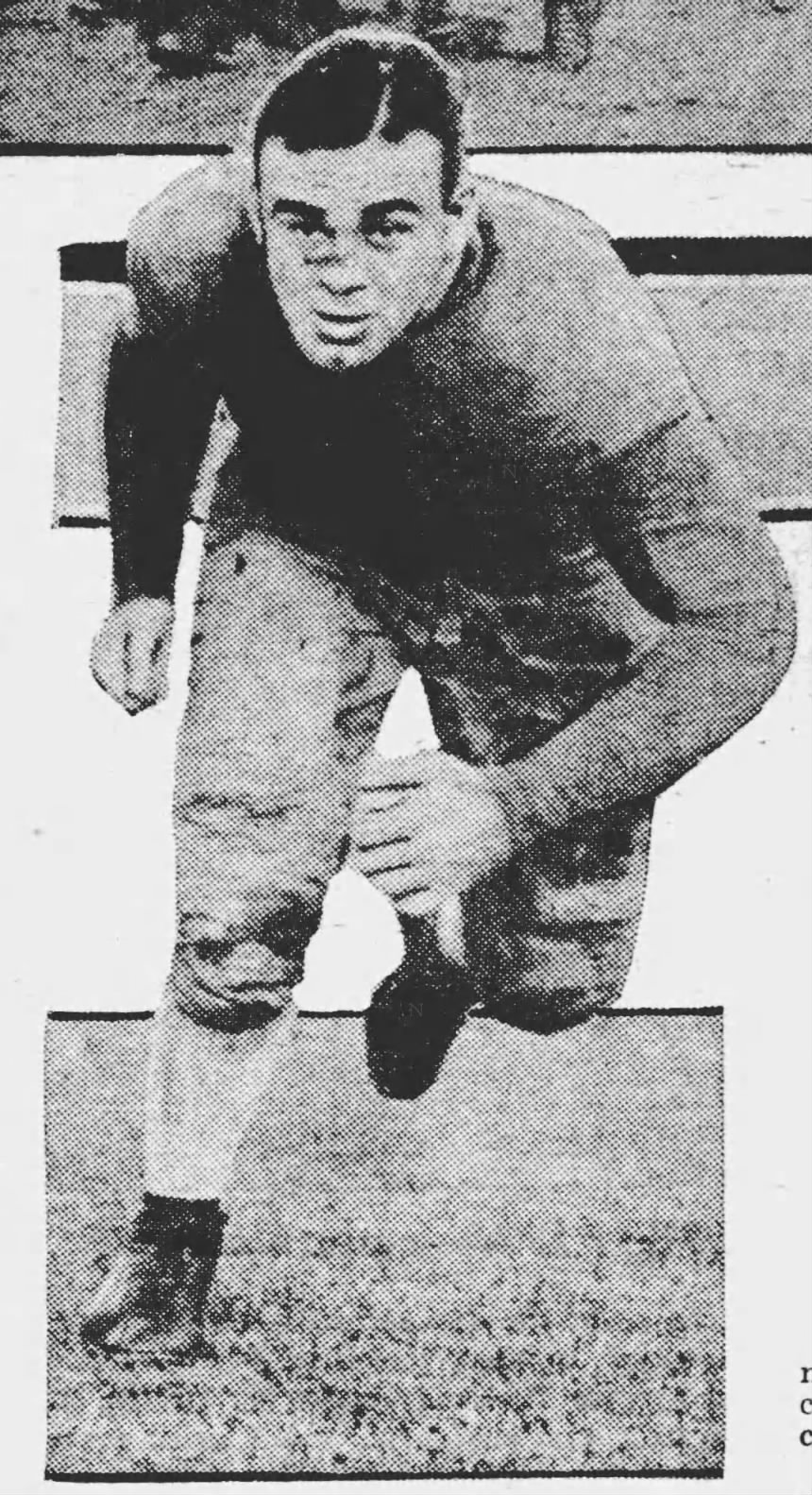
- Maree in 1930

No. 38; 23
- Position: Tackle

Personal information
- Born: December 20, 1909; Savannah, Georgia, U.S.
- Died: November 20, 1976 (aged 66); Marietta, Georgia, U.S.
- Listed height: 6 ft 1 in (1.85 m)
- Listed weight: 204 lb (93 kg)

Career information
- College: Georgia Tech (1928–1931)

Awards and highlights
- National champion (1928); SoCon champion (1928); Third-team All-American (1930); All-Southern (1928, 1929, 1930); Tech All-Era Team (William Alexander Era)

George LaVance "Vance" "Dutch" Maree (December 20, 1909 – November 20, 1976) was an American football and basketball player for the Georgia Tech Yellow Jackets of the Georgia Institute of Technology.

== Early life ==
Vance Maree was born on December 20, 1909, in Savannah, Georgia, to Andrew Morgan Maree and Frances Ann Johstoneaux.

== Georgia Tech ==
=== Football ===
He was a prominent tackle on William Alexander's football teams. Maree is a member of the Georgia Tech Athletics Hall of Fame.

==== 1928 ====
Maree was a member of the 1928 team which was national champion. Maree blocked the punt in the 1929 Rose Bowl which led to an 8 to 7 Tech victory over Cal after Roy Riegels ran 65 yards in the wrong direction.

==== 1930 ====
One writer in 1930 said Vance Maree and Frank Speer had the reputation as "the toughest pair of tackles in the south." Maree was selected All-Southern. He was selected as a third-team All-American by the International News Service in 1930.
