= Ysgol Syr Thomas Jones =

Location
- Pentrefelin; Amlwch, Anglesey, LL68 9TH; Wales; 53.4027°N 4.3519°W

Information
- Type: Comprehensive
- Motto: Gorau, Athro, Ymgais
- Established: 1950; 76 years ago
- Founder: Sir Thomas Jones
- Headteacher: Dylan Jones
- Staff: 50 (Approx.)
- Age: 11 to 18
- Enrollment: 542 (2023)
- Website: www.ysgolsyrthomasjones.cymru

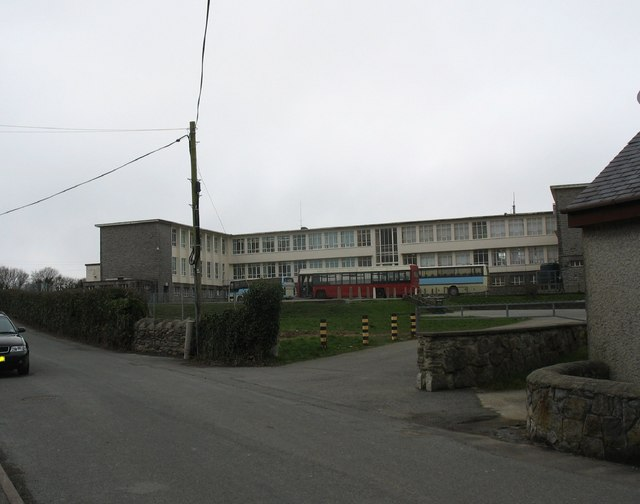

Ysgol Syr Thomas Jones is a mixed bilingual community school for pupils between 11 and 18 years of age in the Pentrefelin area of Amlwch, Anglesey. The school serves the town and the rural catchment area.

== History ==
Originally designed by N. Squire Johnson, Anglesey county architect, with Kenneth M. Raw as job architect, the school was opened in 1950 and named after Sir Thomas Jones (1870–1945), a local doctor and the chairman of the county council, who campaigned for a secondary school at Amlwch. It was the first purpose-built comprehensive school in Britain. Initially designed to accommodate 700 pupils, further blocks were added, and by 1977 there were 1265 pupils on the register. Two main service tunnels run underneath the main corridors with two main entrances. The first is in the 6th form common room. The second is at the base of the clock tower and enters the main hall through a side door. The tunnel accessed both a storage room and a series of unfinished rooms that extend under the foyer and car park.

== Welsh Language ==
Welsh Government defines the school as a bilingual secondary school Category 2B, which means that at least 80% of subjects (excluding Welsh and English) are taught through the medium of Welsh but are also taught through the medium of English. 34% came from Welsh-speaking homes in 2012. As of January 2018, 55% of pupils aged 5 and over spoke Welsh at home.

== Notable people educated at the school ==
- Tom Parry Jones, a scientist, inventor and entrepreneur
- Lemmy, the lead singer of Motörhead, attended the school in the late 1950s.
- Andy Whitfield, an actor

== See also ==
- Category:People educated at Ysgol Syr Thomas Jones
