= Frank Waddey =

American baseball player (1905–1990)

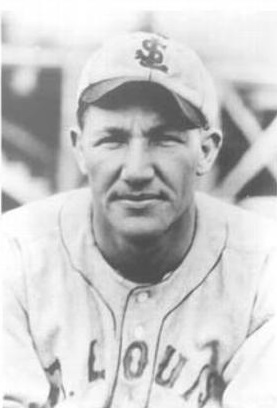
- Outfielder
- Born: August 21, 1905; Memphis, Tennessee, U.S.
- Died: October 21, 1990 (aged 85); Knoxville, Tennessee, U.S.
- Batted: Left Threw: Left

MLB debut
- April 16, 1931, for the St. Louis Browns

Last MLB appearance
- June 22, 1931, for the St. Louis Browns

MLB statistics
- Batting average: .273
- Home runs: 0
- Runs batted in: 2
- Stats at Baseball Reference

Teams
- St. Louis Browns (1931)

Frank Orum Waddey (August 21, 1905 – October 21, 1990) was an American Major League Baseball player. Waddey played in one season, for the St. Louis Browns in the 1931 season. He had six hits, two RBIs and three runs scored in 14 games. He batted and threw left-handed.

An alumnus of the Georgia School of Technology, Waddey was born in Memphis, Tennessee and died in Knoxville, Tennessee. He married Alberta Gilbertson in 1930. He was a member of the Delta Sigma Phi fraternity and the ANAK Society while at Georgia Tech, as well as the varsity baseball and football teams from 1927 to 1929.

== See also ==
- List of Georgia Institute of Technology athletes
