= Thomas H. W. Jones =

Member of the Pennsylvania House of Representatives
- In office 1951–1961

Personal details
- Born: May 15, 1916 Norristown, Pennsylvania, U.S.
- Died: March 23, 1995 (aged 78)
- Party: Republican
- Education: Harvard College; Harvard Law School

Thomas H. W. Jones (May 15, 1916 – March 23, 1995) was an American politician who served five terms in the Pennsylvania House of Representatives.
