= Engineering Education Scheme Wales =

The Engineering Education Scheme Wales (EESW), also referred to as StemCymru, is a Registered Charity based in Bridgend which works to encourage young people to consider engineering as a career. The EESW has been operating nationally in Wales since 1989 and now runs several projects at various stages of education as well as its flagship engineering scheme for students aged 16–18.

== Activities ==
=== The Scheme ===
The scheme for Sixth Form students operates on a yearly basis starting in October and takes on about 450 students from Welsh schools. Small groups of students are assigned a local company and work on a real engineering project with that company over a five-month period. Support is provided by an engineer from the partner company and Welsh universities who provide access to workshops and more powerful equipment. Students work throughout the period to produce a final report with their experiences and findings which is presented to a panel of professional engineers at the EESW's annual Awards and Presentation day in March.

The projects submitted by students are eligible for a Gold CREST Award, awarded by the British Science Association.

=== EESW Student of the Year Award ===
Students that participate in the Sixth Form Project are eligible to apply to the Student of the Year Award, sponsored by Industry Wales. The winner and runner's up are announced at the Wales Automotive Forum's annual networking dinner.

The award considers the overall profile of candidates, not just performance in the Sixth Form Project.

=== Other work ===
==== Stem ====
In 2009, the EESW merged its activities with Technology Alliance Wales (TAW), which previously focused on promoting STEM subjects from primary school age up to Sixth Form. Since then, the EESW has extended its range of activities to include the F1 Challenge, Girls into Engineering, Scalextric Challenge, the Jaguar Sports Car Challenge and an apprenticeship pathway.

==== The F1 Challenge ====
The EESW runs the F1 Challenge in Wales at both primary and secondary levels; the project involves designing and making a model F1 racing car powered by a CO_{2} capsule. Students work in a team to create a portfolio documenting their progress through each stage (e.g. brainstorming, design, testing) before creating a model car to compete in regional finals held in North and South Wales. The winners of the regional finals go on to the UK final held at the Big Bang Event. The winners of the secondary age group UK final represent the country at an international competition which is held in a different country each year.
