= Fanny Price-Gwynne =

Welsh novelist and artist (1819–1901)

Fanny Price-Gwynne (née Price; 1819 – 14 May 1901) was a Welsh novelist, artist, composer, poet and philanthropist. She was a prominent figure in Victorian society, born in the Pembrokeshire town of Tenby. From childhood, Fanny Price had a love of the sea, largely because her father was a Royal Navy master and a trustee of the Tenby charities. He also served the management of the Royal National Lifeboat Institution, and put the first tide tables in the Tenby Observer newspaper. Her mother worked as the local correspondent for the Carmarthen Journal newspaper, and therefore likely encouraged her daughter to take up writing herself.

Her first three novels were guidebooks of Tenby to support tourism: Sketches of Tenby and its Neighbourhood (1846), Allen's Guide to Tenby, and A Guide to Tenby (1869). Other books included the anthology The Tenby Souvenir (1870). In 1845, she married the practising lawyer John Gwynne, one half of the partnership Messrs. Gwynne and Stokes (the other half being William Rees Stokes). Their partnership and marriage gave Fanny a secure financial base in order to continue living her privileged lifestyle. John may have encouraged Fanny's work behind the scenes. After her father died, Fanny stopped writing and started supporting charitable activities. John joined the committee of a cottage hospital in 1870 and Fanny supplied the hospital with a kitchen. They were eager to support any activities that improved Tenby. She served at least 5 years as the Honorary Agent of the Tenby branch of the Shipwrecked Mariners Society and launched an appeal for the distressed fishermen—she distributed collectable coupons that obtained bread and groceries.

After John died in 1880, Fanny withdrew from society for the most part. She had numerous houses left available at St. Julian Street and Bridge Street, such as St. Julian House, where she and her late husband had enjoyed a comfortable life. Later In life, Fanny suffered because her servant was neglectful. After the public investigated the neglect, Fanny was entrusted to the care of Dr. Hamilton. She died aged 82 on 14 May 1901. Some of her artworks are held by Tenby Museum.
