= William Alexander (American football) =

American football player and coach (1889–1950)

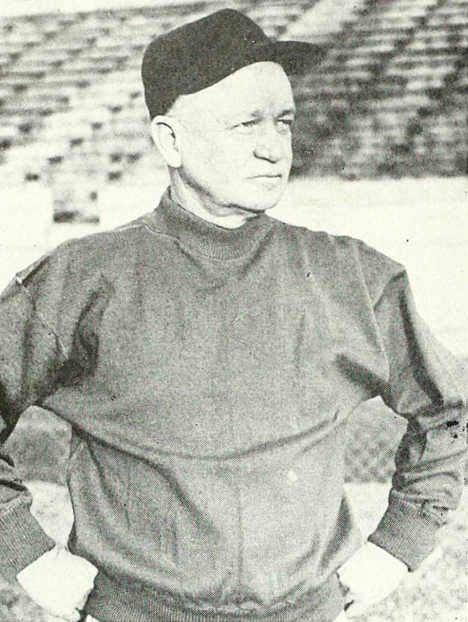
- Alexander from The 1944 Blue Print

Biographical details
- Born: June 6, 1889; Mud River, Kentucky, U.S.
- Died: April 23, 1950 (aged 60); Atlanta, Georgia, U.S.

Playing career
- 1911–1912: Georgia Tech
- Positions: End, quarterback

Coaching career (HC unless noted)

Football
- 1920–1944: Georgia Tech

Basketball
- 1919–1920: Georgia Tech
- 1921–1924: Georgia Tech

Administrative career (AD unless noted)
- 1920–1950: Georgia Tech

Head coaching record
- Overall: 134–95–15 (football); 36–38 (basketball)
- Bowls: 3–2

Accomplishments and honors

Championships
- Football; 1 National (1928); 2 SIAA (1920–1921); 3 SoCon (1922, 1927–1928); 3 SEC (1939, 1943–1944)

Awards
- Football; AFCA Coach of the Year (1942); Amos Alonzo Stagg Award (1947); SEC Coach of the Year (1939)
- College Football Hall of Fame; Inducted in 1951 (profile)

William Anderson Alexander (June 6, 1889 – April 23, 1950) was an American football player and coach. He served as the head football coach at the Georgia Institute of Technology from 1920 to 1944, compiling a record of 134–95–15. Alexander has the second most victories of any Tech football coach. Alexander's 1928 Georgia Tech Yellow Jackets have been recognized as national champions by a number of selectors. Alexander was the first college football coach to place his teams in the four major post-season bowl games of the time: Sugar, Cotton, Orange and Rose. His teams won three of the four bowls. The 1929 Rose Bowl win, which earned his team the national championship, is the most celebrated because of the wrong-way run by California's Roy Riegels. Alexander was also the head basketball coach at Georgia Tech for four seasons from 1919 to 1924. He was inducted into the College Football Hall of Fame as a coach in 1951.

== Player ==
Alexander played football under John Heisman and was appointed captain of the "scrubs." In his senior year he played in the Georgia and Clemson games long enough to win a letter. Alexander graduated from Georgia Tech in 1912 with a degree in civil engineering. Valedictorian of his class, he was also a brother of Kappa Sigma fraternity.

== Coach ==
=== Taking over for Heisman ===
"Old Aleck," as Alexander was called, succeeded John Heisman as the head coach at Georgia Tech in April 1920. Alexander had been an assistant coach for Heisman and a math teacher in the classroom at Georgia Tech. The Technique said of him:

Since Coach Alex has taken charge there is a change in the team. The youngest coach in major football, he is probably the most popular, and bids fair to prove himself the peer of them all. Not only is Coach the idol of members of the team, but of the student body as well.

Alexander also had a sense of humor. Whenever he diagrammed a football play, he always drew very small "x's" to represent Georgia Tech players and very large circles to represent the opposing players. As a new coach, he led Georgia Tech to three Southern Intercollegiate Athletic Association titles (1920, 1921, 1922) and its second national championship in 1928. Buck Flowers and Red Barron starred on his first teams. Alexander was the first college football coach to place his teams in the four major post-season bowl games of the time: Sugar, Cotton, Orange, and Rose. His teams won three of the four bowls.

=== Doug Wycoff ===
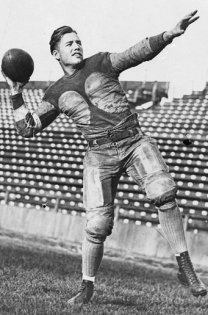
Doug Wycoff

Describing the most spectacular play he ever saw, he cites one from the 1925 game against Vanderbilt. Star back Doug Wycoff was hurt, such that he had to use his substitute Dick Wright. On a muddy field, Wright ran off tackle and dodged Vanderbilt's safety Gil Reese, "usually a sure tackler," to get the touchdown to give Tech a 7 to 0 victory. Coach Alexander further recalled "The work of Douglas Wycoff against Notre Dame two years in succession was brilliant in the extreme, as was his plunging against Penn. State when we defeated them twice."

=== The Plan ===
During the 1927 season, Alexander instituted "the Plan." Tech and UGA had just renewed their annual rivalry game in 1925 after an eight-year hiatus. Georgia was highly rated to start the season and justified their rating throughout the season going 9–0 in their first 9 games. Alexander's plan was to minimize injuries by benching his starters early no matter the score of every game before the UGA finale. On December 3, 1927, UGA rolled into Atlanta on the cusp of a National Title. Tech's well rested starters shut out the Bulldogs 12–0 and ended any chance of UGA's first National Title.

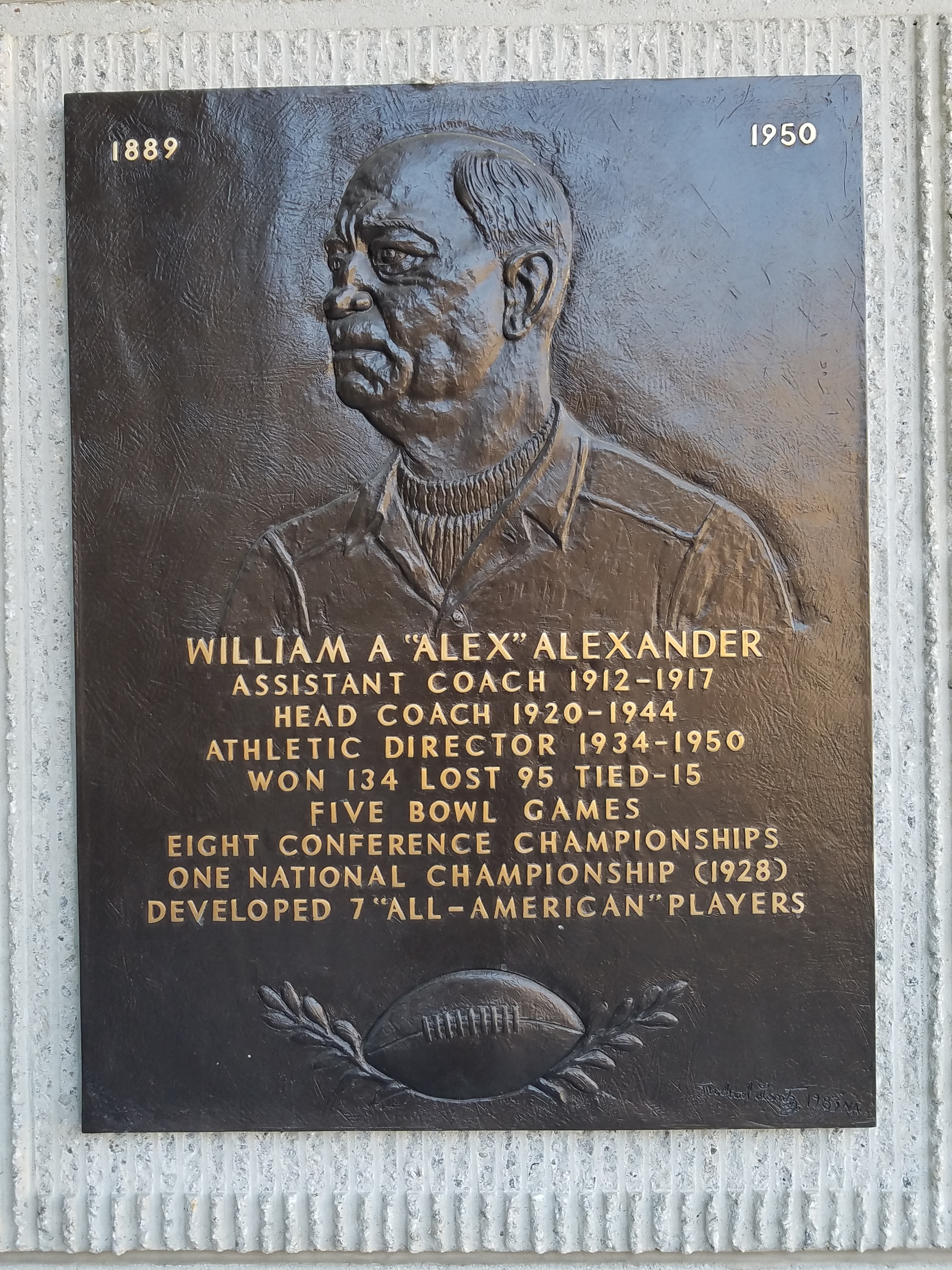
Plaque at Georgia Tech honoring Alexander

=== 1928 ===
Alexander's 1928 team would be the very first Tech team to attend a bowl game. The team had amassed a perfect 9–0 record and was invited to the 1929 Rose Bowl to play California. Tech traveled by train to meet the awaiting Golden Bears. The game was a defensive struggle with the first points being scored after a Georgia Tech fumble. The loose ball was scooped up by California Center Roy Riegels and then accidentally returned in the wrong direction. Riegels returned the ball all the way to Georgia Tech's 3 yard line. After Riegels was finally stopped by his own team, the Bears opted to punt from the end zone. The punt was blocked and converted by Tech into a safety giving Tech a 2–0 lead. Cal would score a touchdown and point after but Tech would score another touchdown to finally win the game 8–7. This victory made Tech the 10–0 undefeated national champions of the 1928 college football season. It was Tech's second national title in 11 years.

=== Depression ===
Coach Alexander found campus spirit to be particularly low during the Great Depression. His football program and the other athletic teams had very few student fans attending the games. His football team faded in success after 1928, not posting another winning record until 1937. He helped to establish a spirit organization known as the Yellow Jacket Club in 1930 to bolster student spirit. The group would later become the Ramblin' Reck Club.

=== All-Alexander Era team ===
- QB Buck Flowers
- HB Stumpy Thomason
- HB Red Barron
- FB Doug Wycoff
- E Bill Jordan
- T Frank Speer
- G Oscar Davis
- C Peter Pund
- G Harvey Hardy
- T Vance Maree
- E Bob Ison

=== AD ===
On January 30, 1945, Coach Alexander retired as head football coach but remained Georgia Tech's athletic director until his death in 1950. Alexander has the second most victories of any Tech football coach.

== Legacy ==
Alexander was succeeded as head coach by one of his assistants, Bobby Dodd, who became the most successful head football coach in Georgia Tech history. Dodd lionized Coach Alexander, which was later reflected in his coaching style. "He taught me to treat athletes as men, not boys - to never use their failings as an alibi for a loss," Dodd said.

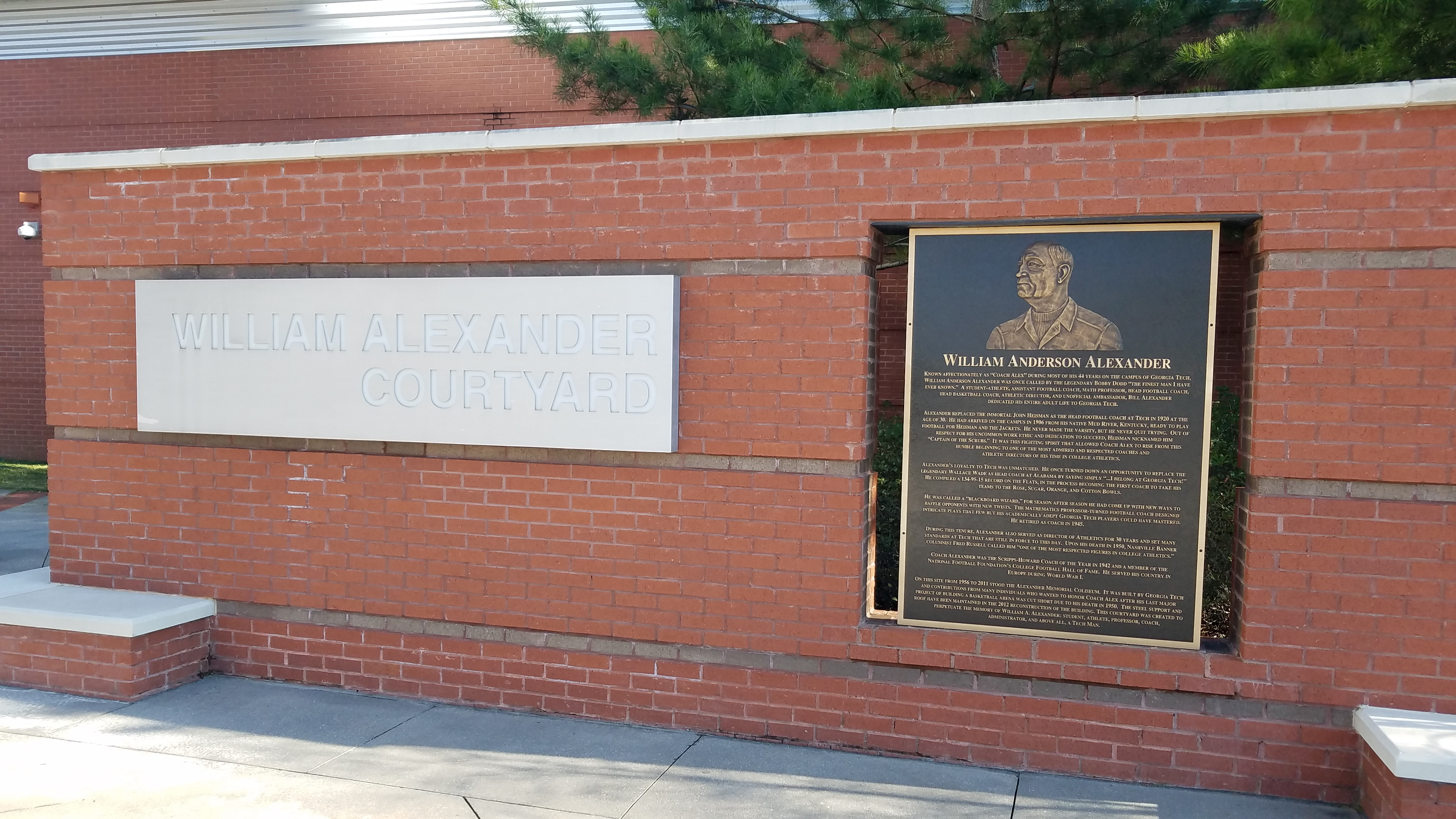
William Alexander Courtyard at McCamish Pavilion

The Alexander Memorial Coliseum (recently renamed Hank McCamish Pavilion), the home arena of Georgia Tech's basketball teams, was named after him.

=== Coaching tree ===
1. Dad Amis: played for Georgia Tech (1920–1923), head coach for Furman (1928–1931).
2. Bobby Dodd: assistant for Georgia Tech (1931–1944), head coach for Georgia Tech (1945–1966)
3. Bill Fincher: played for Georgia Tech (1916–1920), head coach for William & Mary (1921), assistant for Georgia Tech (1927–1928).
4. Don Miller: assistant for Georgia Tech (1925–1928).
5. Mack Tharpe: played for Georgia Tech (1926), assistant for Georgia Tech (1928–1941).

== Head coaching record ==
=== Football ===
Year	Team	Overall	Conference	Standing	Bowl/playoffs	AP^{#}
Georgia Tech Golden Tornado (Southern Intercollegiate Athletic Association) (1920–1921)
1920	Georgia Tech	8–1	5–0	T–1st		
1921	Georgia Tech	8–1	5–0	T–1st		
Georgia Tech Golden Tornado / Yellow Jackets (Southern Conference) (1922–1932)
1922	Georgia Tech	7–2	4–0	T–1st		
1923	Georgia Tech	3–2–4	0–0–4	T–11th		
1924	Georgia Tech	5–3–1	3–2–1	10th		
1925	Georgia Tech	6–2–1	4–1–1	T–5th		
1926	Georgia Tech	4–5	4–3	9th		
1927	Georgia Tech	8–1–1	7–0–1	T–1st		
1928	Georgia Tech	10–0	7–0	1st	W Rose	
1929	Georgia Tech	3–6	3–5	14th		
1930	Georgia Tech	2–6–1	2–4–1	15th		
1931	Georgia Tech	2–7–1	2–4–1	16th		
1932	Georgia Tech	4–5–1	4–4–1	T–10th		
Georgia Tech Yellow Jackets (Southeastern Conference) (1933–1944)
1933	Georgia Tech	5–5	2–5	10th		
1934	Georgia Tech	1–9	0–6	12th		
1935	Georgia Tech	5–5	3–4	8th		
1936	Georgia Tech	5–5–1	3–3–1	T–6th		
1937	Georgia Tech	6–3–1	3–2–1	6th		
1938	Georgia Tech	3–4–3	2–1–3	5th		
1939	Georgia Tech	8–2	6–0	T–1st	W Orange	16
1940	Georgia Tech	3–7	1–5	11th		
1941	Georgia Tech	3–6	2–4	9th		
1942	Georgia Tech	9–2	4–1	T–2nd	L Cotton	5
1943	Georgia Tech	8–3	3–0	1st	W Sugar	13
1944	Georgia Tech	8–3	4–0	1st	L Orange	13
Georgia Tech:		134–95–15	83–54–15			
Total:		134–95–15				
National championship Conference title Conference division title or championship game berth
^{#}Rankings from final AP Poll.
