= Tom Jones (end) =

American football player

No. 5
- Position: End

Personal information
- Born: c. 1909; Clarkesville, Georgia, U.S.
- Listed height: 5 ft 11 in (1.80 m)
- Listed weight: 170 lb (77 kg)

Career information
- College: Georgia Tech (1928–1930)

Awards and highlights
- National champion (1928); All-Southern (1928)

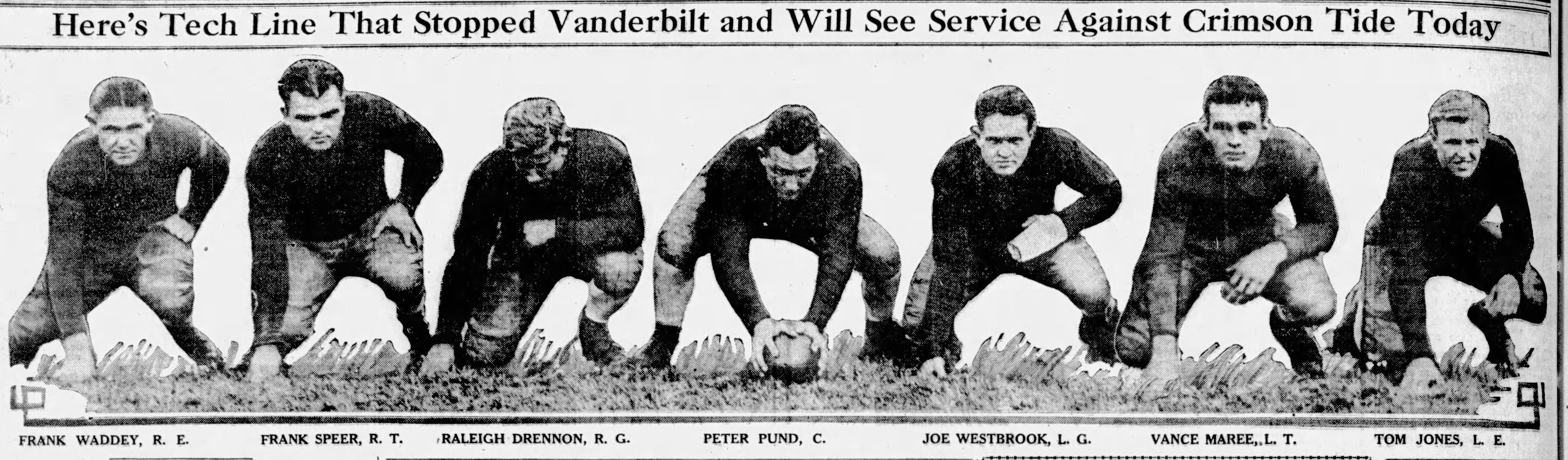
1928 Georgia Tech players, featuring Jones (far right).

Thomas Jones was a college football player. He was a prominent end for coach Bill Alexander's Georgia Tech Yellow Jackets from 1928 to 1930. After a year on the freshman team in 1927, Jones played for the national champion 1928 Golden Tornado. Jones was the alternate-captain of the 1930 team. George Trevor once selected him for an all-time Tech team.
