= Thomas Mason Jones =

Irish radical journalist and political activist (1833–1873)

Thomas Mason Jones (1833–1873) was an Irish radical journalist and political activist.

Jones was born in Ireland, and claimed to have been educated at Trinity College Dublin, although he does not appear in its records. He became known as a radical speaker, and moved to England in 1858, to work as a journalist. He became well known for his work with the National Reformer. His reports on the Garibaldi Legion brought him to wide attention, and he began lecturing on the topic. In 1863, he visited the United States, and on his return to England, he also began lecturing on the American Civil War, and in opposition to slavery.

Jones was a supporter of Chartism, and was one of the main founders of the Reform League, chairing its early meetings, and speaking on its behalf, for which he was nicknamed the "Eloquent Irishman".

Jones stood as a Liberal Party candidate in Coventry at the 1865 United Kingdom general election. During his campaign, he described workers as a "rabble". The Reform League strongly objected to this and stopped working with him. Initially, he remained supportive of the league, and attended its meeting in Hyde Park in 1866, but he gradually moved away from it.

At the 1868 United Kingdom general election, Jones stood in Boston, but was again unsuccessful. By this time, his main interests were disestablishment of the Church of Ireland and financial reform, and he was close to the Liberation Society.

Jones died in 1873, leaving his family in poverty.
