= T. K. Jones =

American civil defense expert

- Born: Thomas Kensington Jones; June 30, 1932; Tacoma, Washington, U.S.
- Died: May 15, 2015 (aged 82); Bellevue, Washington, U.S.
- Education: University of Washington
- Employer(s): Boeing; Nixon administration Reagan administration
- Known for: Belief that humanity could survive nuclear warfare
- Spouse: Deborah Benedetto

Thomas Kensington Jones (June 30, 1932 – May 15, 2015) was an American civil defense expert, best known for his belief that humanity could survive the outbreak of nuclear warfare. In 1982, he attracted wide attention for his comment to Robert Scheer that America could survive a nuclear war "if there are enough shovels to go around." He worked in the Reagan administration and in the arms industry for Boeing.

== Early life and career ==
Thomas Kensington Jones was born on June 30, 1932 in Tacoma, Washington. He attended the University of Washington College of Engineering, getting a job at the company that became Boeing while enrolled in college.

Jones was a consultant with the Nixon administration at the first Strategic Arms Limitation Talks in 1971, working under Paul Nitze, eventually receiving the position of deputy director and senior technical advisor. Jones's policy views were influenced by friend Richard Perle. The policy analyst Strobe Talbott described Jones as a protégé of Perle.

In 1974, Jones began working at Boeing as a program and product evaluation manager. In that role, he put together a report for the Joint Committee on Defense Production studying the Soviet Union's preparations for nuclear war. The report, published by late 1976, determined that they could recover "within no more than two to four years, whereas the U.S. could not recover in less than 12 years." Jones also argued against the idea that "nuclear war would be the end of all mankind." The scholar Dee Garrison wrote that Jones's research at Boeing supplied the Committee on the Present Danger with "false statistics" that allowed it to determine 90% of the USSR's population could withstand a nuclear war.

== Reagan administration ==
In the presidential administration of Ronald Reagan, Jones was appointed to be the deputy undersecretary of defense for research and engineering, strategic, and theater nuclear forces. In late 1981, he was interviewed by Robert Scheer, who interviewed a number of Reagan administration officials. A write-up was published in the Los Angeles Times in January the following year. In the interview, Jones espoused his faith that the United States could survive a nuclear war. He claimed that the country could recover fully in two to four years, saying that "everybody's going to make it if there are enough shovels to go around. Dig a hole, cover it with a few doors, and then throw three feet of dirt on top. It's the dirt that does it." Scheer later criticized this as demonstrating a lack of appreciation for the effects nuclear war would bring. He wrote that Jones's views were shared by many in the Reagan administration, but that he was "more outspoken than the others."

These comments received wide publicity, especially the quote about "enough shovels to go around." They harmed the credibility of the administration, and were generally "dismissed" by most experts. In Menominee, Michigan, around 250 peace activists held a public "dig-in" where they spent thirty minutes attempting to dig a shelter, and were unsuccessful.

Jones was called several times to testify before committees of the United States Senate after the publicity his comments received. The Reagan administration attempted to send someone else to testify in his place. On March 17, 1982, he missed a scheduled testimony, an absence that The Boston Globe attributed to the Reagan administration telling him not to attend. Senator Paul Tsongas criticized the move sharply, stating that if the Reagan administration wished "to engage in right-wing ideology and destroy my children, I for one am not going to idly stand by." Senator Alan Cranston said that Jones's comments were "far beyond the bounds of reasonable, rational, responsible thinking." Senator Larry Pressler accused the administration of being "afraid to expose Mr. Jones to a wider audience". In the testimony he eventually gave before the Committee on Foreign Relations, on March 31, 1982, he attempted to deny that he had estimated the US could recover from a nuclear war in only a few years. His efforts were unsuccessful, because Scheer had recorded the interview.

In 1983, when asked who T. K. Jones was, Reagan reportedly did not know. That year, Jones was investigated by the federal government over concerns his severance package upon leaving Boeing was excessively high. In 1986 he was sued for taking an abnormally large $132,000 package, one that the United States Department of Justice claimed left him with a conflict of interest when working for the United States.

== Later career ==
Jones returned to Boeing after leaving the Reagan administration, where he worked until retiring in 1999.

== Personal life and death ==
Jones went by "T.K." He was described by Strobe Talbott as "a tall, slim, mild-mannered, scholarly looking man with modishly styled, prematurely gray hair, and an oddly distracted, almost mechanical way of speaking," who struck some "as the human prototype for C-3PO." He was married to Deborah Benedetto.

He died in Bellevue, Washington, on May 15, 2015, of complications from Parkinson's disease.

== Bibliography ==
- Dallek, Robert (1984). Ronald Reagan : the politics of symbolism. Cambridge, Mass. : Harvard University Press. ISBN 978-0-674-77940-2 – via Internet Archive.
- Garrison, Dee (2006). Bracing for Armageddon: Why Civil Defense Never Worked. Oxford University Press. ISBN 978-0-19-518319-1.
- Rapoport, Anatol (1995). The origins of violence : approaches to the study of conflict. Transaction Publishers. ISBN 978-1-56000-783-8 – via Internet Archive.
- Rose, Kenneth D. (2001). One Nation Underground: The Fallout Shelter in American Culture. NYU Press. ISBN 978-0-8147-7522-6.
- Talbott, Strobe (1984). Deadly gambits : the Reagan administration and the stalemate in nuclear arms control. Random House. ISBN 978-0-394-53637-8 – via Internet Archive.
