= Robert Anderson Evans =

- Born: Unknown
- Died: 26 August 1901
- Occupation: Executioner
- Years active: 1873-1875

Robert Ricketts Evans, later known as Robert Anderson, was a Welsh executioner from 1873 to 1875.

Evans, of Carmarthen, Wales, was trained as a physician but did not practice. He carried out seven hangings as the chief executioner and also assisted William Calcraft on various occasions.

His most famous hanging was a triple hanging of murderers Mary Anne Barry, Edwin Bailey, and Edward Butt on 12 January 1874 at Gloucester Prison. For this hanging, which was done in the open courtyard, Anderson suggested that the platform of the gallows be mounted over a pit to make it level with the prison yard. Barry did not die instantly, and Anderson had to press down on her shoulders to quicken her death. Barry was the last woman to be hanged by the short drop method in England and also the last woman to be executed at Gloucester Gaol.

== See also ==
- List of executioners
