= Tom Parry Jones =

Welsh scientist, inventor and entrepreneur (1935–2013)

Tom Parry Jones OBE
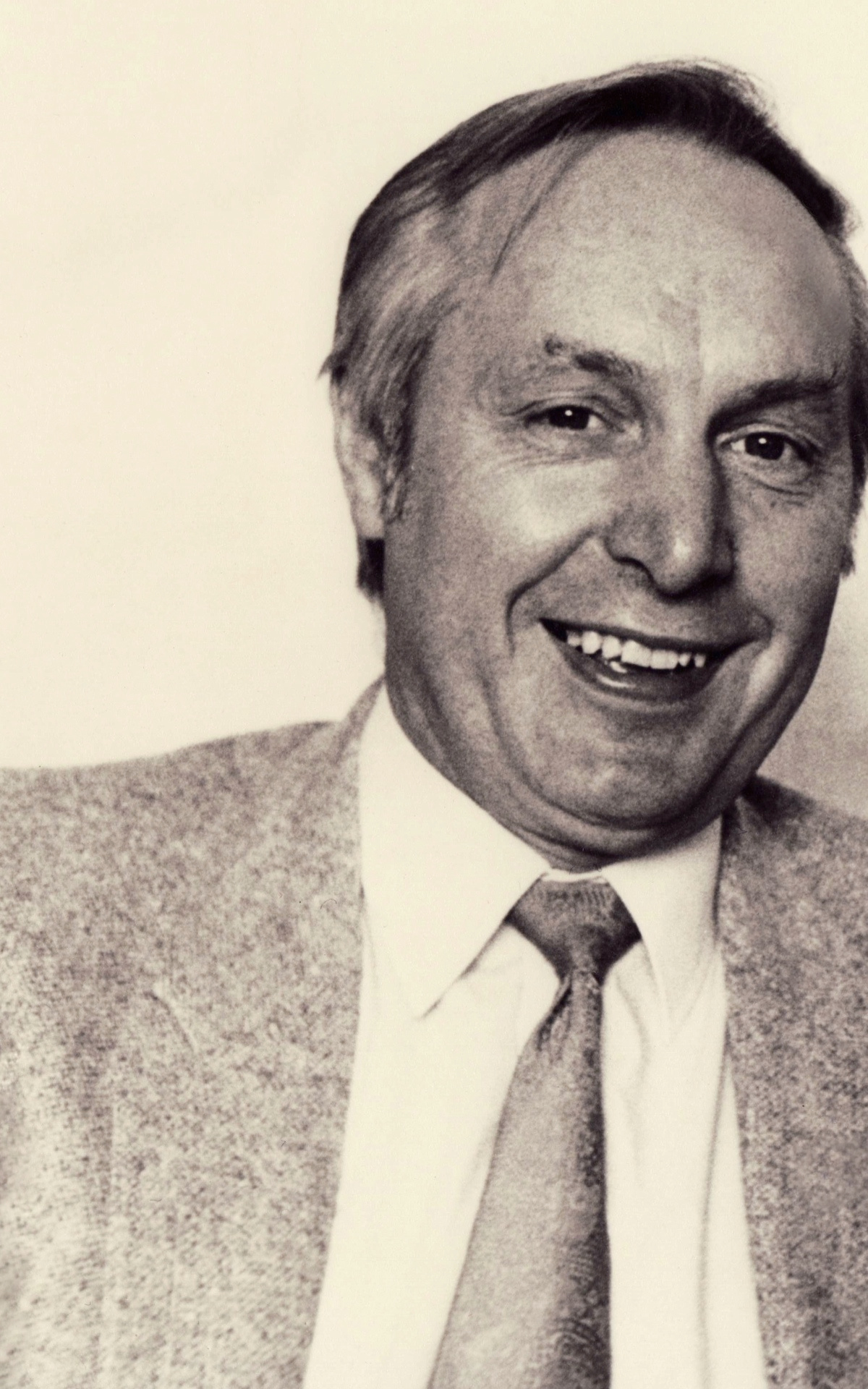
- Born: March 27, 1935; Carreglefn, Wales
- Died: January 11, 2013 (aged 77); Llandudno, Wales
- Education: Bangor University; University of Alberta
- Known for: Electronic breathalyser
- Spouse: Raj Jones

Thomas Parry Jones OBE (27 March 1935 – 11 January 2013) was a Welsh scientist, inventor and entrepreneur, who was responsible for developing and marketing the first handheld electronic breathalyser, winning the Queen's Award for Technological Achievement in 1980 for the work. Born and raised on Anglesey, he attended Bangor University and went on to study for his doctorate at University of Alberta, Canada. Prior to his work on the breathalyser at Lion Laboratories, he was a lecturer at the Royal Military College of Science and the University of Wales Institute of Science and Technology. He established the Dr Tom Parry Jones Endowment Fund at Bangor University in 2002. After selling Lion Laboratories in 2005, he set up PPM Technology and Welsh Dragon Aviation. A trust was set up in his, and his wife's, names. The Tom and Raj Jones Trust promotes work by young entrepreneurs.

== Early life, education and early career ==
Parry Jones was born on 27 March 1935 at Carreglefn, near Amlwch, Anglesey, North Wales, the son of a farmer. He was a native Welsh language speaker, which he used as a first language. Parry Jones attended the primary school at Carreglefn and the Ysgol Syr Thomas Jones comprehensive school at Amlwch. He studied chemistry at Bangor University, graduating in 1958, and then took a doctorate at the University of Alberta, Canada.

Following his doctorate, Parry Jones appointed as a lecturer at the Royal Military College of Science at Shrivenham, Oxfordshire. In 1964, he moved to the University of Wales Institute of Science and Technology (UWIST) at Cardiff.

== Lion Laboratories ==
In 1967, Parry Jones established Lion Laboratories in Cardiff, with his colleague and managing director William "Bill" Ducie, an electrical engineer. The Road Safety Act 1967 introduced the first legally enforceable maximum blood alcohol level for drivers in the UK, above which it became an offence to be in charge of a motor vehicle; and introduced the roadside breathalyser, made available to police forces across the country.

In 1969, Lion Laboratories' version of the breathalyser, known as the Alcolyser, and incorporating crystal-filled tubes that changed colour (yellow to green) above a certain level of alcohol in the breath. Parry Jones continued to work at the University at this time, until in 1975 when he asked for a two-year leave of absence in order to investigate the commercial possibilities of the device. During 1976 he informed the University that he would not be returning. Lion Laboratories won the Queen's Award for Technological Achievement in 1980 for development of the first hand-held electronic breath-alcohol instrument (Alcolmeter), and this device was later marketed worldwide. Alcohol in the breath was analysed by an electrochemical [fuel cell] sensor rather than chemical crystals, providing a more reliable kerbside screening test for alcohol influence. A positive test was then complemented by sampling blood or urine for analysis at a forensic laboratory.

In 1983 breath-alcohol analysis was accepted for evidential purposes and Lion Intoximeter 3000 was the first instrument approved by the British Home Office for testing drunken drivers. More recently, a much more sophisticated breath-alcohol analyzer, the Lion Intoxilyzer 6000 is now used by the UK police for evidential purposes. In 1991, Lion Laboratories was sold to the American company MPD, Inc. Parry Jones later said, "I found inventing the device the easy part. But producing it, developing it and selling it was the challenge."

== Other activities ==
Parry Jones later set up PPM Technology, a company manufacturing instruments for monitoring toxic gases. Through PPM, he supported chemistry students at Bangor University. He also established a small air charter company, Welsh Dragon Aviation, in which he flew return charter flights for passengers from Mona Airport to Cardiff in a Cessna 340. For more than two decades, Parry Jones was a trustee of the Engineering Education Scheme for Wales; a student of the year award is given out annually by the organisation. In 2005, he was named a fellow of Bangor University.

=== Endowment Fund ===
In about 2002, he established the Dr Tom Parry Jones Endowment Fund, at Bangor University, to encourage young people to develop careers and entrepreneurship in science and technology. The fund supports an annual Bangor Science Festival. He was also chairman of the Welsh Centre for International Affairs; and a trustee of the Engineering Education Scheme for Wales.

== Personal life ==
With his ex-wife Jean, he had a son, Gareth and two daughters Diane and Sara. Parry Jones was appointed an Officer of the Order of the British Empire (OBE) in 1986. He was inducted into the Gorsedd in 1997.

=== Death ===
On 11 January 2013, Parry Jones died at Llandudno General Hospital, aged 77, following a short illness. Following his death, Bangor University released a statement which read "Dr Tom Parry Jones' worldwide reputation and genuine enthusiasm for developing Wales' future economy through ensuring that young people are well supported in developing their scientific knowledge and entrepreneurial skills – made him a treasured alumnus of Bangor University." A memorial service was held at Capel Mawr, Llangristiolus, which was followed a day later by his cremation at Bangor Crematorium. He was survived by his wife, children and mother.

A plaque honouring Parry Jones was unveiled by his wife, Raj, at the Llangefni police station in November 2013. The Tom and Raj Jones Trust was set up which promotes young entrepreneurs. The inaugural Tom Parry Jones Memorial Lecture was given in 2014 at Bangor University by First Minister of Wales, Carwyn Jones. It was entitled "A Breathtaking Legacy of an Inventor, Entrepreneur & Philanthropist", and Jones said "I am very pleased to be able to be part of the inaugural Tom Parry Jones Memorial Lecture and, in doing so, to further honour such an outstanding role model for researchers, entrepreneurs and philanthropists across Wales and far beyond". Coinciding with that lecture, the Jones o Gymru Crisp company released a sweet chilli crisp dedicated to Parry Jones's achievements, which raised money for the Trust.
