= Thomas John Jones =

Welsh officer in the British Merchant Navy

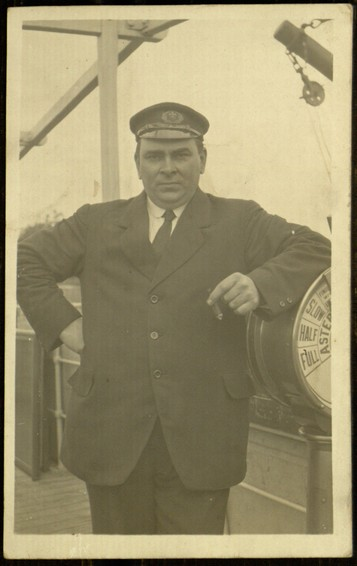
Thomas John Jones

Thomas John Jones (1874 – presumed dead) was a Welsh officer in the British Merchant Navy from 1893 to, at the least, 1913. Much of his naval career involved the foreign-going steamship, the SS Knight Errant, where he served as an officer.

== Biography ==
Thomas John Jones of Aberarth was born in 1874, near Aberaeron, Wales. In 1888, at the age of fourteen, Jones paid thirty pounds to enter the service of George Brown of Glasgow. He completed his indenture in 1893 and immediately found work as a seaman with the British Board of Trade.

Over the next four years, 1893 – 1897, Jones served in numerous capacities aboard foreign-going ships including The Janet McNeil, The Highland Glen, and the SS Bendo. Pleased with his service, all three shipmasters wrote positive recommendations and unanimously agreed that Jones was an ideal candidate for Master. On 23 June 1897 he left his position as 3rd Officer of the S.S. Bendo to pursue the rank of Master. Indeed, later that year, on 25 August 1897, Jones received his Certificate of Competency as Master from the Board of Trade. From 1898-1901, he served as Captain of the Janet McNeil.

By 1902, Jones joined the crew of the SS Knight Errant as an officer, though his specific duties are unknown. It was on this ship that Jones’ spent the next decade of his nautical career. Jones’ and the SS Knight Errant, sailed the same fatal course of the RMS Titanic, only one week later, and noted there "was not a vestige of ice or wreckage”.

== Notable works and personal items ==
During his time as a seafaring officer, Jones compiled a comprehensive logbook of voyages aboard the SS Knight Errant from 1909-1913. He detailed each route in nautical miles and compared variant routes in order to determine the most efficient course from multiple ports around the world. His notes contain information on various topics that include commentary on East Asian monsoons and hurricanes in the West Indies, on entering the Yangtze River, on how to accurately navigate sea currents, and on pilot signals in England.

While at sea, Jones referenced books such as “Rules of the Road” by Thomas Gray (surveyor), issues of the Nautical Magazine, and the Ship Captain’s Medical Guide, a publication sanctioned by the Board of Trade.
