= Alis Mallt Williams =

Author and celtophile

Alice Matilda Langland Williams
- Born: 4 October 1867; Brecknockshire, Wales
- Died: 28 October 1950 (aged 83)
- Occupation: Novelist
- Writing career
- Language: Welsh

Alice Matilda Langland Williams, more commonly known as Alys Mallt and Y Fonesig Mallt (4 October 1867 – 28 October 1950), was a Welsh political writer and celtophile. She was born in Brecknockshire to an English-speaking family, but learned the Welsh language when influenced by the circle of Welsh heiress Augusta Hall, Baroness Llanover.

Throughout her adult life, Williams was part of a campaign for Welsh home rule. She supported Welshness in dress and speech. She also joined Welsh nationalist organisations, such as Cymru Fydd and Plaid Cymru. She spoke admiringly for the zeal of Irish nationalists.

== Early life and education ==
Williams was born to an English-speaking, middle-class family of Brecknockshire. She was probably born in Oystermouth, Gower, although some sources say Aberclydach, Tal-y-bont on Usk, Brecknockshire. She was the fourth child of John James Williams, M.D. She had a sister, Gwenfreida; and two brothers, William and Frederick. In her youth, she came under the influence of Lady Llanover and her circle. From them Williams learned to speak Welsh and adopted the 'traditional' Welsh costume of dress, along with her brother Frederick who dressed like a 13th-century Welsh lord.

== Career as a novelist ==
In 1889, when she was 22, Williams published her first novel with her sister, Gwenfreida, under the name "Y Ddau Wynne". The novel, called One of the Royal Celts, is an idealised fictionalisation of the British Empire, in which Celtic valour is presented as the reason for the success of the empire. The novel's main character is Glyndŵr Parry Lloyd, a man who can trace his ancestry back to the last Welsh prince, Llywelyn ap Gruffydd. There is not a single English character in the book. It has been argued that Gwenfrieda's political beliefs were the foundation of the novel. However, Williams went on to write and publish A Maid of Cymru, which is a romance, but again highly patriotic. Published in 1901, it was symbolically related to the failure of the campaign for Welsh home rule which was active at this time. This is shown by the death of the Tangwysh who was trampled to death by wild ponies.

In 1929, along with her nephew Ioan Penry Brychan Robertson, she published the Welsh birthday book, Llyfr Penblwydd.

== Political career ==
In 1896 Williams was the second person to join Urdd y Delyn, an organisation established by Owen M. Edwards to promote Welsh arts and culture. Urdd y Delyn offered prizes for harp playing, speaking Welsh, reading Welsh books and penillion singing. Under the pen name of "Gwobrywyon Aberclydach", Williams later presented prizes for harp playing at the national eisteddfodau.

Between 1911 and 1916 Williams was central to the foundation of Byddin Cymru, a radical nationalist group concerned with protecting the Welsh language. The movement published its ideology in the pages of a magazine called Cymru'r Plant.

She attended Irish and Welsh movement meetings zealously and could not be wavered on her stance for Welshness in dress and speech. In one of her annual addresses to Byddin Cymru, she urged the members to copy the zeal of the Irish, but after the 1916 Easter Rising, she was more subdued.

Throughout her life she constantly supported Urdd Gobaith Cymru, Plaid Cymru and the National Eisteddfod. She was a supporter of the campaign against the establishment of the Royal Air Force Training Camps at Porth Neigwl and Penyberth, and it was she who gave then the nickname Ysgolion Formio 'bombing schools'. Williams was part of the Welsh home rule movement and the Cymru Fydd campaign.

== Later years and legacy ==
In her later life, Williams gave a hundred pounds to supporters of the Welsh language and culture.

In 1915 she moved to Plas Pantsaeson with her younger brother, Frederick, where she spent the rest of her life. She died there on 28 October 1950, near St Dogmaels. She was cremated at Pontypridd and her ashes were scattered in the churchyard at Llansanffraid, Brecknockshire.

Williams influenced a new wave of women's writers along with Gwyneth Vaughan, a fellow activist and writer.

== Novels ==
- One of the Royal Celts (1889)
- A Maid of Cymru (1901)
- Llyfr Penblwydd (1929)
