= Thomas Jones (footballer, born 1889) =

English footballer

Personal information
- Full name: Thomas Jones
- Date of birth: 1889
- Place of birth: Stanton Hill, England
- Date of death: 8 April 1923 (aged 33–34)
- Place of death: England
- Height: 6 ft 1/2 in (1.84 m)
- Position: Goalkeeper

Senior career*
| Years | Team | Apps | (Gls) |
| 1914–1919 | Mansfield Wesleyans | | |
| 1919–1921 | Huthwaite Colliery | | |
| 1921–1922 | Grimsby Town | 3 | (0) |
| 1922–192? | New Hucknall Colliery | | |
- * Club domestic league appearances and goals

Thomas Jones (1889 – 8 April 1923) was an English professional footballer who played as a goalkeeper. He died of injuries sustained during a match in 1923.
