= Tom Jones (Welsh cricketer) =

Welsh cricketer (1901–1935)

Personal information
- Full name: Thomas Charles Jones
- Born: 1 April 1901; Pontypool, Monmouthshire, Wales
- Died: 19 July 1935 (aged 34); Westminster, London, England
- Batting: Right-handed

Domestic team information
- Years: Team
- 1925 & 1928: Glamorgan

Career statistics
Competition	FC
Matches	3
Runs scored	36
Batting average	6.00
100s/50s	–/–
Top score	21
Balls bowled	–
Wickets	–
Bowling average	–
5 wickets in innings	–
10 wickets in match	–
Best bowling	–
Catches/stumpings	–/–
- Source: Cricinfo, 28 June 2010

Lt. Thomas Charles Jones (1 April 1901 – 19 July 1935) was a Welsh cricketer. Jones was a left-handed batsman. He was born at Pontypool, Monmouthshire.

Jones made his first-class status debut for Glamorgan in 1925 against Somerset. He played one further first-class match during that season against Gloucestershire. His final first-class match for Glamorgan came against Warwickshire in 1928. In his brief first-class career, he scored 36 runs at a batting average of 6.00 and a high score of 21.

Outside of cricket, Jones was a lieutenant in the British Army, which limited his appearances in first-class cricket. Jones died at Westminster, London on 19 July 1935.
