= 1902 in Wales =

- Centuries: 18th; 19th; 20th; 21st
- Decades: 1880s; 1890s; 1900s; 1910s; 1920s
- See also: List of years in Wales; Timeline of Welsh history 1902 in The United Kingdom Scotland Elsewhere

This article is about the particular significance of the year 1902 to Wales and its people.

== Incumbents ==
- Archdruid of the National Eisteddfod of Wales – Hwfa Môn
- Lord Lieutenant of Anglesey – Sir Richard Henry Williams-Bulkeley, 12th Baronet
- Lord Lieutenant of Brecknockshire – Joseph Bailey, 1st Baron Glanusk
- Lord Lieutenant of Caernarvonshire – John Ernest Greaves
- Lord Lieutenant of Cardiganshire – Herbert Davies-Evans
- Lord Lieutenant of Carmarthenshire – Sir James Williams-Drummond, 4th Baronet
- Lord Lieutenant of Denbighshire – William Cornwallis-West
- Lord Lieutenant of Flintshire – Hugh Robert Hughes
- Lord Lieutenant of Glamorgan – Robert Windsor-Clive, 1st Earl of Plymouth
- Lord Lieutenant of Merionethshire – W. R. M. Wynne
- Lord Lieutenant of Monmouthshire – Godfrey Morgan, 1st Viscount Tredegar
- Lord Lieutenant of Montgomeryshire – Sir Herbert Williams-Wynn, 7th Baronet
- Lord Lieutenant of Pembrokeshire – Frederick Campbell, 3rd Earl Cawdor
- Lord Lieutenant of Radnorshire – Powlett Milbank
- Bishop of Bangor – Watkin Williams
- Bishop of Llandaff – Richard Lewis
- Bishop of St Asaph – A. G. Edwards (later Archbishop of Wales)
- Bishop of St Davids – John Owen

== Events ==
- 4 March – Five miners are killed in a mining accident at Milfaen Colliery, Blaenavon.
- 1 May – Cardiff Corporation Tramways begins operating its electric system.
- 3 June – Six miners are killed in an accident at Gerwen Colliery, Llanelli.
- 26 June – In the 1902 Coronation Honours, Isambard Owen and Alfred Thomas receive knighthoods.
- 15 July – Francis Grenfell is created 1st Baron Grenfell of Kilvey in the County of Glamorgan.
- 31 July – Opening of the first section of the Great Orme Tramway at Llandudno, the longest funicular railway in the British Isles.
- 2 August – A. G. Edwards, Bishop of St Davids, is appointed Honorary Chaplain to the Denbighshire Yeomanry.
- August – Opening of the Vale of Rheidol Railway for goods traffic (it opens to passengers on 22 December).
- 11 November – Five miners are killed in an accident at Deep Navigation Colliery, Mountain Ash.
- date unknown
  - Alfred Mond founds his nickel works at Clydach in the Swansea Valley.
  - 230 Welsh colonists leave Patagonia for Manitoba in Canada.
  - Opening of Caernarfon electric power station.

== Arts and literature ==
=== Awards ===
- National Eisteddfod of Wales – held in Bangor
  - Chair – T. Gwynn Jones
  - Crown – R. Silyn Roberts

=== New books ===
==== English language ====
- Rhoda Broughton – Lavinia
- Violet Jacob – The Sheep-stealers
- Arthur Machen – Hieroglyphics
- Allen Raine – A Welsh Witch

==== Welsh language ====
- Hugh Brython Hughes – Tlysau Ynys Prydain
- Thomas Rowland Roberts – Y Monwyson

=== Music ===
- Sir Henry Walford Davies – Three Jovial Huntsmen

== Sport ==
- Gymnastics – The Welsh Amateur Gymnastics Association is formed.
- Rugby union – Wales win the Home Nations Championship and take the Triple Crown.

== Births ==
- 4 February – Tal Harris, Wales international rugby player (died 1963)
- 25 February – Wogan Philipps, 2nd Baron Milford, politician (died 1993)
- 4 March – David Evans-Bevan, industrialist (died 1973)
- 19 March – Dilys Cadwaladr, poet (died 1979)
- 16 April – Hugh Iorys Hughes, civil engineer (died 1977 in England)
- 22 April – Megan Lloyd George, politician (died 1966)
- 18 June – Morgan Phillips, politician (died 1963)
- 17 July – Nathan Rocyn-Jones, doctor, international rugby player and President of the WRU (died 1984)
- 2 September – Leslie Gilbert Illingworth, political cartoonist (died 1979)
- 21 September – E. E. Evans-Pritchard, anthropologist of Welsh descent (died 1972)
- 27 October (in Oxford) – Harold Arthur Harris, academic (died 1974)
- 26 November (in Wales or Bristol) – Cyril Bence, academic and politician (died 1992)
- date unknown – Richard Bryn Williams, writer (died 1981)

== Deaths ==
- 1 January – William McConnel, industrialist, 93
- 11 January – James James, harpist and composer, 69
- 19 February – Jeremiah Jones, poet, 46
- 6 March – William Rathbone, politician, 82
- 11 March – Alcwyn Evans, historian, 73
- 6 April – Robert Owen, theologian, 81
- 5 June – Arthur Powell Davies, English-born American minister, author, and activist of Welsh parentage (d. 1957)
- 13 July – Edmund Hannay Watts, industrialist (Wattstown)
- 14 July – Martyn Jordan, Wales international rugby player, 37
- 23 August – Robert Henry Davies, colonial official in British India, 78
- 5 October – Henry Lascelles Carr, journalist
- 18 October – Margaret Jones, travel writer (Y Gymraes o Ganaan), 60
- 17 November – Hugh Price Hughes, minister and anti-Parnell campaigner, 55
- December – Thomas Davies, footballer, 36/37
- date unknown – Jones Hewson, singer and actor, 27

== See also ==
- 1902 in Ireland
