= 1902 in Scotland =

- Centuries: 18th; 19th; 20th; 21st
- Decades: 1880s; 1890s; 1900s; 1910s; 1920s
- See also: List of years in Scotland; Timeline of Scottish history 1902 in: The UK • Wales • Elsewhere; Scottish football: 1901–02 • 1902–03

Events from the year 1902 in Scotland.

== Incumbents ==
- Secretary for Scotland and Keeper of the Great Seal – Lord Balfour of Burleigh

=== Law officers ===
- Lord Advocate – Andrew Murray
- Solicitor General for Scotland – Charles Dickson

=== Judiciary ===
- Lord President of the Court of Session and Lord Justice General – Lord Blair Balfour
- Lord Justice Clerk – Lord Kingsburgh

== Events ==
- 5 April – The original Ibrox disaster: a stand at Ibrox Stadium in Glasgow collapses during an England versus Scotland football match. 25 people die and 517 are injured.
- 29 July – St Lawrence's Church, Dingwall (Roman Catholic) opens.
- 15 October – The North British Hotel in Edinburgh opens its doors for the first time.
- 2 November – The first Scottish National Antarctic Expedition, organised and led by naturalist William Speirs Bruce, sets out from Troon in the Scotia.
- 10 November – Percival Spencer and the Rev. J. M. Bacon make the first-ever hot air balloon flight from the Isle of Man, landing in Dumfriesshire.
- Pulteneytown merged into the burgh of Wick.

== Births ==
- 16 January (in China) – Eric Liddell, athlete, international rugby union player and missionary (died 1945 in a Japanese-run internment camp in China)
- 26 March – Marion Cameron Gray, mathematician (died 1979)
- 27 March – Kenneth Macpherson, cinematographer (died 1971 in Tuscany)
- 24 July – Renée Houston, née Katherina Houston Gribbin, comedy actress (died 1980)
- 19 August – Fyfe Robertson, television presenter (died 1987)
- 28 October – Jenny Gilbertson, née Brown, documentary filmmaker (died 1990)
- 20 December – Jock Cunningham, soldier, mutineer, Republican lieutenant colonel in Spanish civil War (died 1969)

== Deaths ==
- 20 February – David MacGibbon, architect (born 1831)
- 29 June – John Stuart McCaig of Muckairn and Soroba, creator of McCaig's Tower, Oban (born 1823)
- 16 July – Henry Dunning Macleod, economist (born 1821)
- 28 August – George Douglas Brown, novelist (born 1869)
- 29 September – William McGonagall, weaver, doggerel poet and tragedian (born 1825)

== The arts ==
- First modern play in Scottish Gaelic staged, in Edinburgh.
- The Classical Association of Scotland founded

== See also ==
- Timeline of Scottish history
- 1902 in the United Kingdom
