= List of listed buildings in Dingwall =

This is a list of listed buildings in the parish of Dingwall in Highland, Scotland.

== List ==
Name	Location	Date Listed	Grid Ref. (Note: Sometimes known as OSGB36, the grid reference (where provided) is based on the British national grid reference system used by the Ordnance Survey. • "Guide to National Grid". Ordnance Survey. • "Get-a-map". Ordnance Survey.)	Geo-coordinates	Notes	LB Number (Note: Historic Environment Scotland assign a unique alphanumeric identifier to each designated site in Scotland, for listed buildings this always begins with "LB", for example "LB12345".)	Image
The Castle and Roderick Maclennan Monument	Castle Street			57°35′53″N 4°25′22″W	Category B	24499	Upload another image
Caisteal Gòrach	By Tulloch Castle			57°37′00″N 4°26′18″W	Category A	24520	Upload another image See more images
Free Church Of Scotland	High Street			57°35′41″N 4°25′26″W	Category B	24508	Upload another image See more images
Royal Bank Of Scotland	High Street			57°35′42″N 4°25′29″W	Category B	24509	Upload another image
Dingwall Railway Station. Down And Up Platform Ranges, Down Platform Staff Shelter	Station Road			57°35′41″N 4°25′21″W	Category B	24514	Upload another image See more images
St Clements Church (Church of Scotland Parish Church), Gatepiers And Burial Ground	Tulloch Street			57°35′49″N 4°25′44″W	Category A	24516	Upload another image See more images
Former Seaforth Sanatorium And Lodge	Maryburgh			57°34′39″N 4°27′00″W	Category B	6360	Upload another image
Hydro Board (now Highland Theological College)	High Street			57°35′43″N 4°25′26″W	Category B	24502	Upload another image
63, 64 High Street	High Street			57°35′44″N 4°25′41″W	Category B	24505	Upload Photo
Tulloch Farm, Steading, Houses And Garden Wall				57°36′35″N 4°25′47″W	Category B	24519	Upload Photo
Dovecote	Castle Street			57°35′50″N 4°25′24″W	Category B	24498	Upload another image
Sheriff Court, Prison and Former Police Station	Ferry Road			57°35′41″N 4°25′13″W	Category B	24500	Upload another image
58, 59, 60 High Street and 1-2 Mcgregor's Court				57°35′44″N 4°25′37″W	Category C(S)	24503	Upload Photo
Tulloch Castle and Arched Tunnel Entrance				57°36′32″N 4°25′58″W	Category B	24518	Upload another image See more images
Greenhill Street Park Garage (Former Park Cottage)	Greenhill Street			57°35′38″N 4°25′31″W	Category B	24521	Upload another image
Drynie				57°36′42″N 4°26′48″W	Category C(S)	1822	Upload Photo
Humberston				57°35′05″N 4°26′06″W	Category C(S)	1823	Upload Photo
St Ninians	Castle Street			57°35′46″N 4°25′29″W	Category B	24497	Upload Photo
Ross Memorial Hospital	Ferry Road			57°35′39″N 4°25′04″W	Category B	24501	Upload another image See more images
Town Hall	High Street			57°35′44″N 4°25′42″W	Category B	24506	Upload another image See more images
Clydesdale Bank, Park House	High Street			57°35′42″N 4°25′30″W	Category B	24510	Upload Photo
Hector Macdonald Memorial	Mitchell Hill			57°35′33″N 4°25′44″W	Category B	24513	Upload another image See more images
Caledonian Hotel	High Street			57°35′44″N 4°25′39″W	Category C(S)	24504	Upload another image
Mercat Cross	High Street			57°35′44″N 4°25′42″W	Category B	24507	Upload another image
The Retreat	High Street			57°35′42″N 4°25′36″W	Category B	24511	Upload another image
9 Hill Street	Hill Street			57°35′39″N 4°25′35″W	Category B	24512	Upload Photo
14 High Street	High Street			57°35′43″N 4°25′40″W	Category C(S)	51618	Upload Photo
Warehouse, Former Ben Wyvis Distillery	Station Road			57°35′26″N 4°25′26″W	Category B	24515	Upload another image
Cromartie Memorial, Obelisk	Tulloch Street			57°35′49″N 4°25′41″W	Category B	24517	Upload another image See more images

== Key ==
The scheme for classifying buildings in Scotland is:

- Category A: "buildings of national or international importance, either architectural or historic; or fine, little-altered examples of some particular period, style or building type."
- Category B: "buildings of regional or more than local importance; or major examples of some particular period, style or building type, which may have been altered."
- Category C: "buildings of local importance; lesser examples of any period, style, or building type, as originally constructed or moderately altered; and simple traditional buildings which group well with other listed buildings."

In March 2016 there were 47,288 listed buildings in Scotland. Of these, 8% were Category A, and 50% were Category B, with the remaining 42% being Category C.

== See also ==
- List of listed buildings in Highland
