= Duncan Leitch (minister) =

Scottish minister (1903–1974)

Duncan Leitch (c.1903–1974) was a Scottish minister, who served as Moderator of the General Assembly of the Free Church of Scotland in 1952.

== Life ==
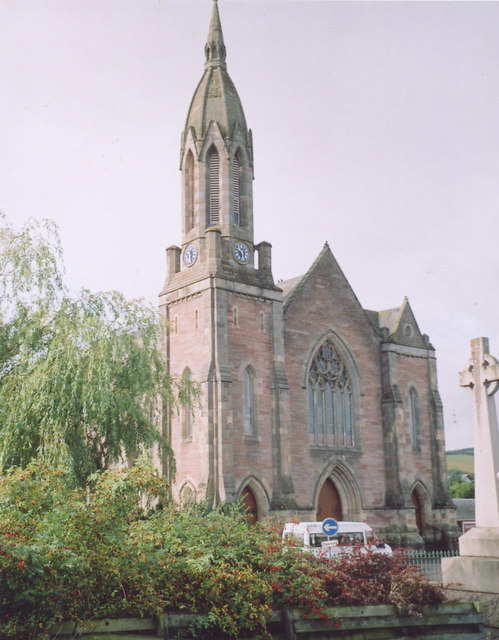
Free Church in Dingwall

He was born in Bannockburn and originally was apprenticed as a draughtsman in the Dumbarton shipyards during the closing years of the First World War (presumably working on warships). After the war he decided to retrain as a minister of the Free Church. In 1929 he was inducted to St Columba Free Church in Aberdeen and remained there until 1940.

In October 1940 he moved to Kingussie and by 1952 when he became Moderator of the Free Church's General Assembly, he was minister of Dingwall.

He died in Dingwall on New Year's Eve, 31 December 1974. He is buried in the churchyard at Fodderty.

== Family ==
He was married to Janet Milne.
