= Robert Owen (theologian) =

Robert Owen (13 May 1820 – 6 April 1902) was a Welsh theologian and antiquarian.

== Life ==
Owen was born in Dolgellau, Merionethshire, on 13 May 1820. After being educated at Ruthin School, Owen attended Jesus College, Oxford, matriculating in 1838. He obtained a third-class Bachelor of Arts degree in Literae Humaniores in 1842, with further degrees of Master of Arts (1845) and Bachelor of Divinity (1852). He was a Fellow of Jesus College from 1845 until 1864, when an allegation of immorality forced his resignation.

In 1843, Owen was ordained by Christopher Bethell, Bishop of Bangor. However, he held no position after serving as curate until 1845 at Tremeirchion. He was influenced by the Oxford Movement and corresponded with John Henry Newman, before and after Newman converted to Catholicism. Owen was a supporter of disestablishment of the Welsh Church, believing that this would help promote its catholic character. After his resignation, he retired to his estate at Vron-y-graig, Barmouth, and carried on his writings. He died, unmarried, on 6 April 1902 and was buried at Llanaber.

== Works ==
Owen has been described by one biographer as having "a claim to be considered the most erudite of the nineteenth-century fellows of his college". He edited The Unbloody Sacrifice by John Johnson in 1847. His major works were An Introduction to the Study of Dogmatic Theology (1858), and Institutes of Canon Law (1884), written at the prompting of Walter Kerr Hamilton, who was Bishop of Salisbury. In 1880, he published Sanctorale Catholicum, or, Book of Saints (1880) which not only included a significant number of Welsh saints but was also the first such book to include "just men" of the Anglican church. He also wrote The Kymry: their Origin, History and International Relations, based on his study of Welsh history and philology, and a verse work, Pilgrimage to Rome (1883).
