= Colin Calder =

Founder of Rosario Central (1860–1907)

Colin Bain Calder 1st President of C.A. Rosario Central
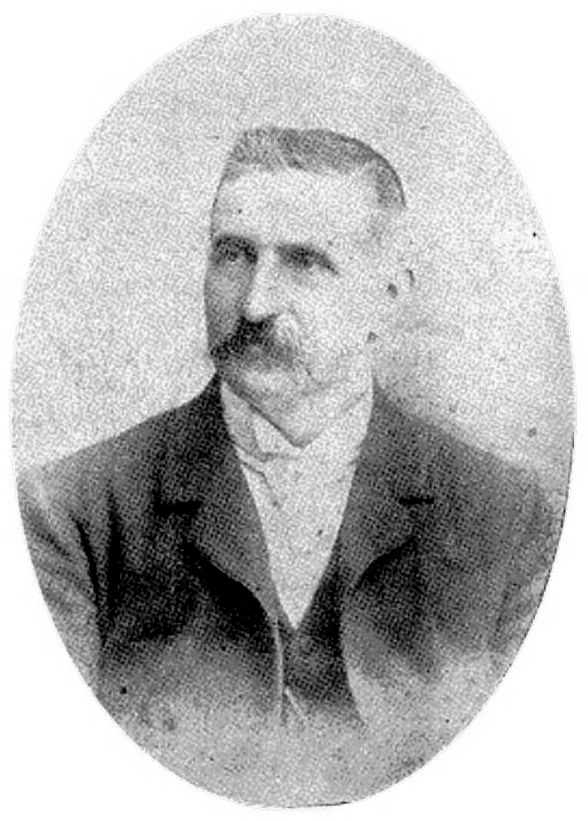
- Born: 16 April 1860; Dingwall, Ross and Cromarty, Scotland
- Died: 25 January 1907 (aged 46); Rosario, Argentina
- Resting place: Cementerio de Disidentes, Rosario
- Monuments: Colin Bain Calder street, Rosario
- Citizenship: United Kingdom
- Education: Saint Clement's School
- Occupation: Railway worker
- Employer: Central Argentine Railway
- Title: President of C.A. Rosario Central
- Term: 24 December 1889 – 1900
- Successor: William Taylor Paul
- Spouse: Mary Green
- Children: Lily Jane, Charlotte, Margaret, Elizabeth, John Colin Alexander
- Relatives: Michael H. Green, Danny Green (brothers in law)

Colin Bain Calder (16 April 1860 – 25 January 1907) was a Scottish immigrant to Argentina regarded as one of the founders (and then first president) of C.A. Rosario Central. He also served at the British-owned Central Argentine Railway (Ferrocarril Central Argentino), one of the biggest railway companies in Argentina.

== Biography ==
=== First years ===
Calder was born in Dingwall, Ross and Cromarty, in the Scottish Highlands. His middle name, Bain, was his mother's surname. His family enjoyed prosperity, as his father Alexander Bain was a prestigious cabinetmaker. After his father's death, the family economic situation worsened. His mother worked as a seamstress and the family moved into a poor house.

At the age of ten, Calder was still at school and living with his mother. By the time he was 21, Calder was working as a coach painter at a carriage works and the family was in better circumstances.

=== Arrival in Rosario ===
Calder migrated to Rosario to work for the Central Argentine Railway, a British-owned company, and by 1889, when he was aged 29, he was the manager of the Central Argentine Railway Paint Shop. He was also a local champion of the game of football.

=== President of Rosario Central ===
Before 1889, Calder, together with his secretary Chamberlain, asked the railway company to provide land for teams to play football. This was achieved, and on the historic day of 24 December 1889 he was elected as the first president of the recently formed "Central Argentine Railway Athletic Club" (then "Rosario Central"). He made a fiery speech in favor of football, and to the detriment of cricket, the other sport the British had brought to Argentina. He continued to serve as president until 1900. His eleven years in office makes him the club's third longest-serving president, after Víctor Vesco and Federico Flynn.

== Private life ==
In 1890, Calder married Mary Green, who was also from Scotland, born in Addiewell, and a sister of Michael and Daniel Green. They had five children: Lily Jane, Charlotte, Margaret, Elizabeth, and John Colin Alexander.

Calder died in 1907, at the age of 46. His remains are in the Nonconformist Cemetery at Rosario.

== Memorials ==
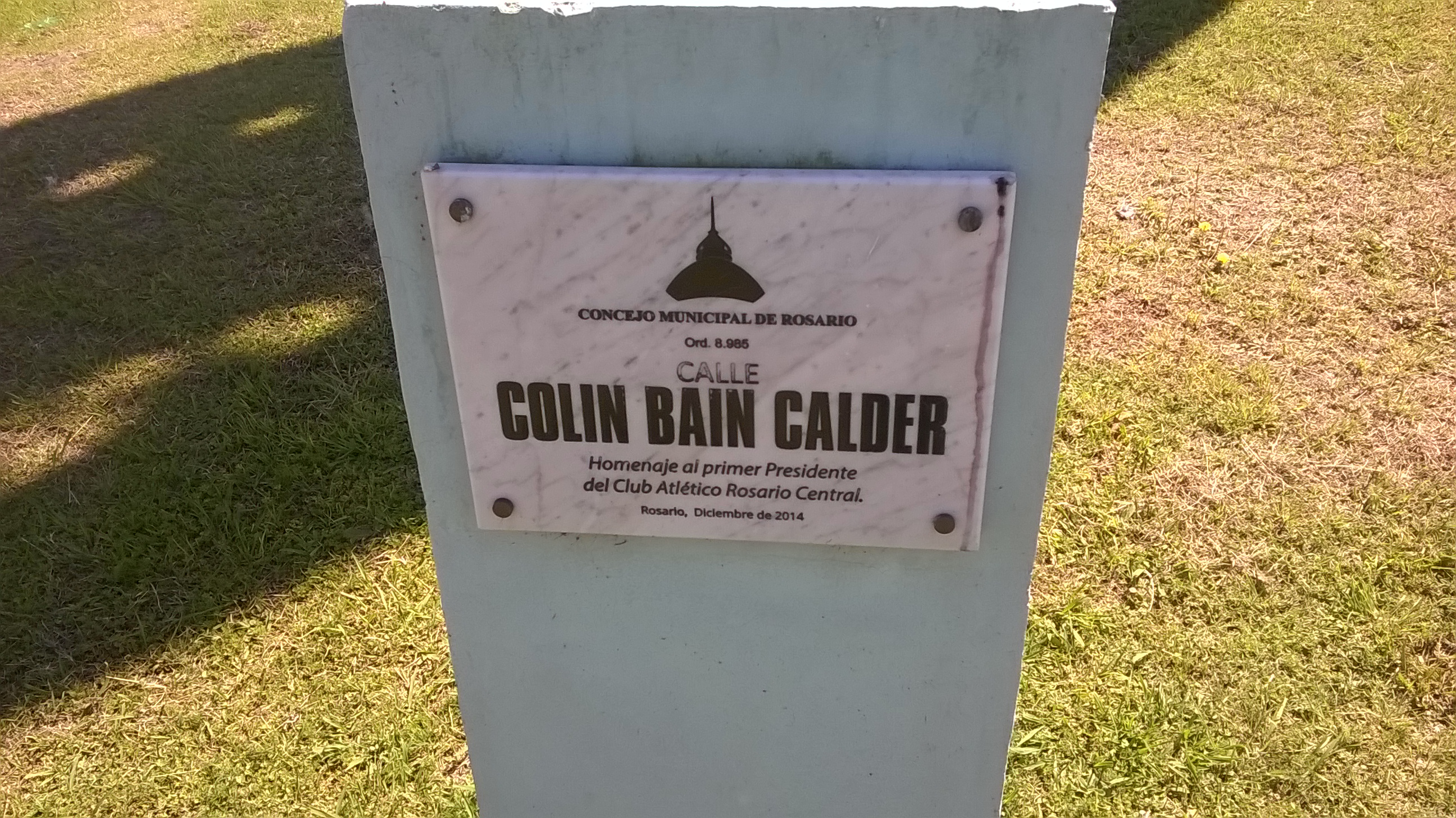
Plate at the beginning of Colin Calder street that remembers the date of its mention

On 23 December 2014, by order of the Municipal Council of Rosario, a street was named Calle Colin Calder (Colin Calder Street). This is in the Alem Park and joins Colombres Avenue with Nansen Street.

In 2011, after a contact initiated by one of Calder's descendants, his native city of Dingwall named him an Honorary Citizen.
