= County Buildings, Dingwall =

Courthouse in Dumbarton, Scotland

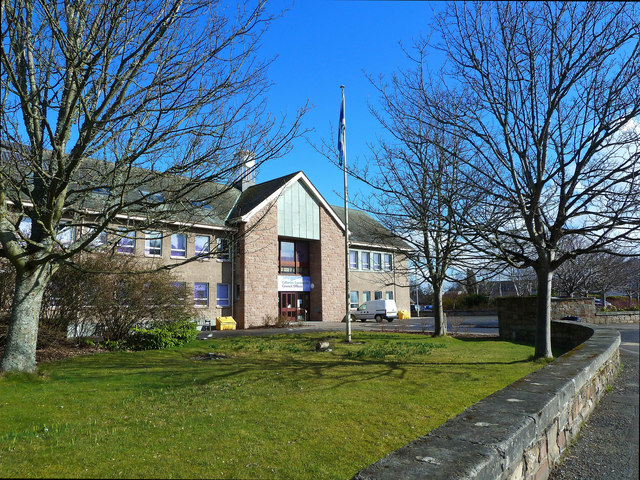
- County Buildings, Dingwall

- Shown in Highland
- 57.5959°N 4.4326°W
- Location: High Street, Dingwall

History
- Built: 1965

Site notes
- Architect: C. Porteous
- Architectural style: Modern style

County Buildings is a municipal structure in the High Street, Dingwall, Highland, Scotland. The complex was the headquarters of Ross and Cromarty County Council and is currently used by the Highland Council as offices for the provision of local services.

== History ==
The Ross and Cromarty Commissioners of Supply served as the main administrative body for the county from 1667 until 1890 when the county council was created and took over most of the commissioners' functions. In the early 19th century, the commissioners met at 63–64 High Street but moved to the courthouse in Ferry Road once it was completed in 1845.

Following the implementation of the Local Government (Scotland) Act 1889, which established county councils in every county, the new county leaders needed to identify offices for Ross and Cromarty County Council. The county council initially operated from the courthouse in Ferry Road, but moved to the Old Academy Buildings in Tulloch Street in the 1930s. However, in the early 1960s, the council leaders decided that they needed purpose-built accommodation: the site they selected in the High Street had been an old military depot.

The new building was designed by C. Porteous of the Ross and Cromarty County Council Architects' Department in the modern style, built in brick with a buff render and was completed in 1965. The design involved an asymmetrical main frontage facing onto the High Street. The main frontage featured an entrance bay, which was located to the right of the centre and which projected forward; the entrance itself, which was constructed from steel and glass, was slightly recessed, flanked by coursed stone and surmounted by slate tiles set into a gable. The wings to either side of the entrance bay were fenestrated by casement windows which were set out in a regular pattern on two floors. Behind the main frontage there was another wing extending northwards which was built and fenestrated in the same style. Internally, the principal room was the council chamber.

After the abolition of Ross and Cromarty County Council in 1975, ownership of the main building passed to Highland Regional Council and, following the introduction of unitary authorities in 1995, ownership based to the Highland Council. It subsequently continued to be used by the council as offices for the provision of local services.
