= Dingwall Sheriff Court =

Courthouse in Dingwall, Scotland

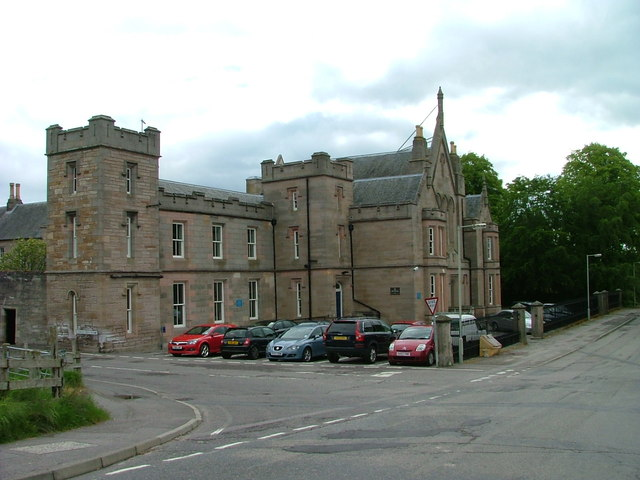
- Dingwall Sheriff Court

- Shown in Highland
- 57.5946°N 4.4202°W
- Location: Ferry Road, Dingwall

History
- Built: 1845

Site notes
- Architect: Thomas Brown II
- Architectural style: Gothic Revival style

Listed Building – Category B
- Official name: Dingwall Sheriff Court including former police station, prison, gatepiers and railings, Ferry Road, Dingwall
- Designated: 31 August 1983
- Reference no.: LB24500

Dingwall Sheriff Court is a former judicial structure in the High Street, Dingwall, Highland, Scotland. The complex, which was used as the headquarters of Ross and Cromarty County Council as well as the local courthouse before being converted for residential use in 2015, is a Category B listed building.

== History ==
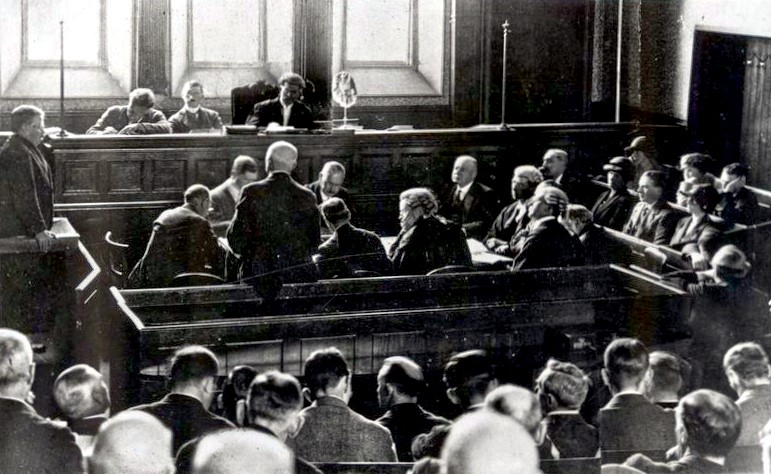
The inquiry into the Loch Maree Hotel botulism poisoning at Dingwall Sheriff Court, September 1922

The Ross and Cromarty Commissioners of Supply served as the main administrative body for the county from 1667 until 1890 when the county council was created and took over most of the commissioners' functions. In the early 19th century, the commissioners met at 63–64 High Street but, in the early 1840s, they decided that a bespoke courthouse should be commissioned. The site they chose had been formed by filling in an artificial pit with hard rubble.

The new building was designed by Thomas Brown II in the Gothic Revival style, built in ashlar stone and was completed in 1845. The design involved an asymmetrical main frontage of nine bays facing onto Ferry Road. The central section of three bays, which was projected forward, featured an arched doorway with a hood mould flanked by lancet windows on the ground floor, a prominent tripartite window on the first floor and another lancet window in the gable above. The outer bays of the central section were fenestrated by oriel windows on both floors and there were gables above. The left-hand section of five bays featured castellated towers at either end, while the right-hand section of just one bay also took the form of a castellated tower. A prison block was erected to the rear of the courthouse. Internally, the principal room was the main courtroom on the first floor.

A three-bay police station, designed by Andrew Maitland, was erected to the right of the courthouse in 1865. Following the implementation of the Local Government (Scotland) Act 1889, which established county councils in every county, Ross and Cromarty County Council established its offices in the building. The building was the venue for the inquiry into the deaths of the eight people who died as a result of the Loch Maree Hotel botulism poisoning in 1922.

The county council relocated to the Old Academy Buildings in Tulloch Street in the 1930s and the police service vacated the complex when they moved to a modern police station to the west of County Buildings in 1972. The Ferry Road building continued to accommodate the sheriff court until its closure in January 2015, and was subsequently converted for residential use.

== See also ==
- List of listed buildings in Dingwall
