= Dingwall Town Hall =

Municipal Building in Dingwall, Scotland

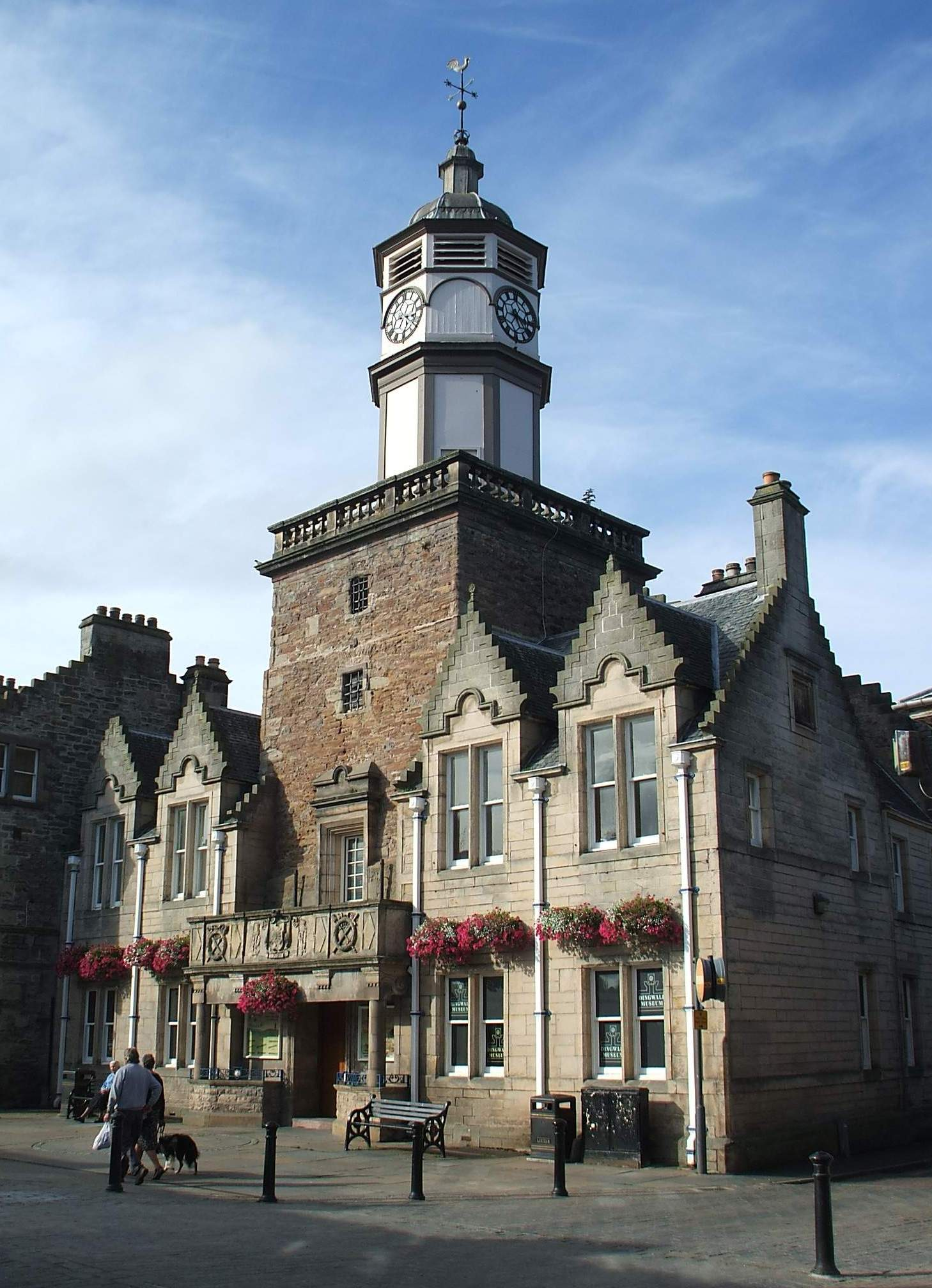
- Dingwall Town Hall

- Shown in Highland
- 57.5956°N 4.4285°W
- Location: High Street, Dingwall

History
- Built: 1745

Site notes
- Architect: Mr Downie
- Architectural style: Neoclassical style

Listed Building – Category B
- Official name: High Street, Town Hall
- Designated: 25 March 1971
- Reference no.: LB24506

Dingwall Town Hall is a municipal structure in the High Street, Dingwall, Highland, Scotland. The structure, which is now used as a museum, is a Category B listed building.

== History ==
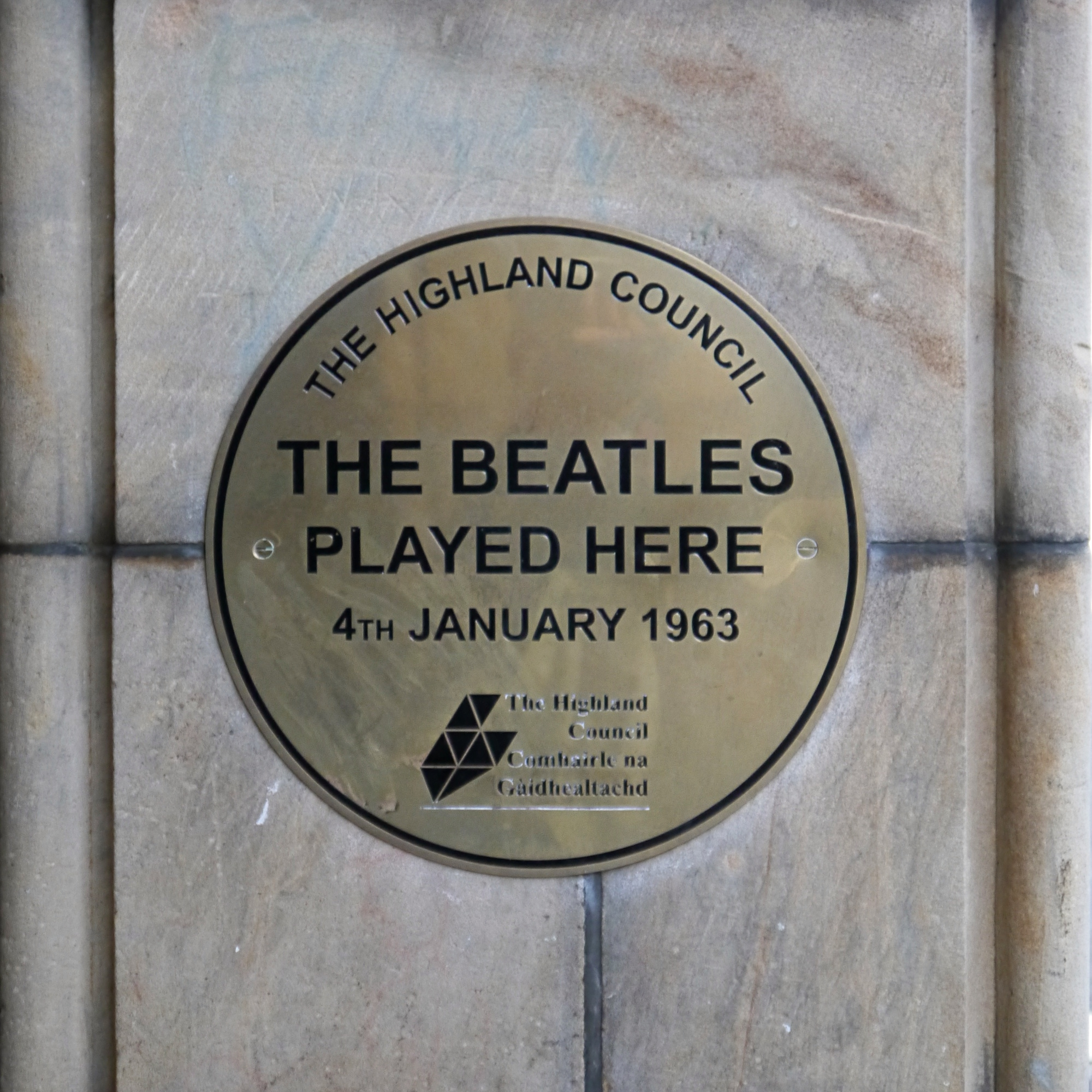
Plaque next to the entrance

In 1729, the burgh leaders decided that the town needed a municipal building in which to hold civic functions and to incarcerate offenders: the site they selected was the residence of one of the burgesses, Alexander Dingwall, who was offered alternative accommodation elsewhere in the town.

The new building was designed by a Mr Downie in the form of a tolbooth, built by a local builder, William MacNeill, in rubble masonry and was completed in 1745. The original design involved a symmetrical main frontage with five bays facing onto the High Street; the central bay featured a flight of steps leading up to an entrance on the first floor: there was a square stone structure known as "the steeple" above. There were doorways in the flanking bays on the ground floor and regular fenestration in the outer bays on the ground floor and in both the flanking and outer bays on the first floor. Internally, the principal rooms, which were on the first floor, were council chamber was on the left and the courtroom on the right. The ground floor was used as a lock-up while the steeple accommodated a debtors' prison.

In 1773, the steeple was augmented by a tall timber octagonal cupola, built by Donald McNeil to a design by John Boag: the clock for the cupola was a gift to the town from the former member of parliament for Tain Burghs, Major-General John Scott. The building was remodelled to a design by William Cumming Joass in 1905 with the addition of stepped gables to the wings, which were projected forward from their original positions, and a central portico with columns supporting an entablature and a balcony.

The rooms in the town hall continued to be used for public events and performers there included the rock band, The Beatles, who gave a concert on 4 January 1963. There were only 19 attendees as most people in the town went to the see the local band, The Melotones, at the Strathpeffer Pavilion that night. The rock band, Slade, played a concert at the venue on 14 November 1970.

The town hall was also the venue for political events: at the 1983 general election, the future Leader of the Liberal Democrats, Charles Kennedy, was proclaimed the local member of parliament in the town hall.

The building continued to serve as the headquarters of the burgh council, but ceased to be the local seat of government when the enlarged Ross and Cromarty District Council was formed in 1975. At that time, the building became the home of the Dingwall Museum: the collection includes a reconstruction of a local smithy as well as a room devoted the life of Major-General Sir Hector MacDonald who saw action at the Battle of Omdurman in 1898.

== See also ==
- List of listed buildings in Dingwall, Highland
