= Margaret Jones (writer) =

Welsh travel writer (1842–1902)

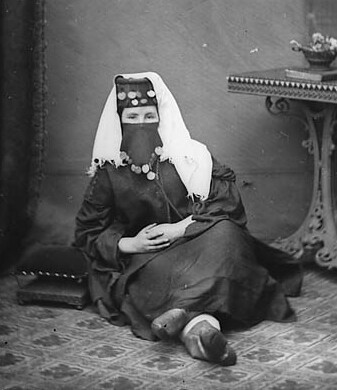
- A photograph of Margaret Jones taken around 1875.
- Born: March 1842; Rhosllannerchrugog, Denbighshire, Wales
- Died: 18 October 1902 (aged 60); Redbank Plains, Queensland, Australia
- Spouse: James Josey
- Writing career
- Pen name: Y Gymraes o Ganaan
- Language: Welsh
- Genre: Travel literature

Margaret Jones (March 1842 – 18 October 1902) was a 19th-century Welsh travel writer whose work was published under the pseudonym Y Gymraes o Ganaan.

== Biography ==
Margaret Jones was born in 1842 in Rhosllannerchrugog, Denbighshire, Wales.

As a child, she received only three weeks of schooling. She then left for Birmingham, where she worked as a maid for a Jewish family which had been converted to Christianity. It was in this role that she began travelling the world, spending two years in Paris and four in Jerusalem with the family as they performed missionary work in the Jewish communities there.

Jones became well known in Wales for writing accounts of her international travels, notably in Palestine and Morocco. Over the course of her travels, she visited five continents: Europe, Asia, Africa, North America, and Oceania. She wrote in Welsh under the pseudonym Y Gymraes o Ganaan, meaning 'The Welsh Lady from Canaan'.

In 1869, she published Llythyrau Cymraes o Wlad Canaan, a collection of letters home from her travels in Palestine. Her subsequent memoir of her travel to Morocco, Morocco a'r hyn a welais yno, was published in 1883.

After further travels in the United States, Jones eventually settled in Australia, where she married a wealthy farmer called James Josey, who had been exiled there from England. She lived there until her death, in Redbank Plains, Queensland, in 1902.
