= St Lawrence's Church, Dingwall =

Coordinates: 57.59708°N 4.42386°W

St. Lawrence's Church, Dingwall
- St. Lawrence's Roman Catholic Church, Dingwall
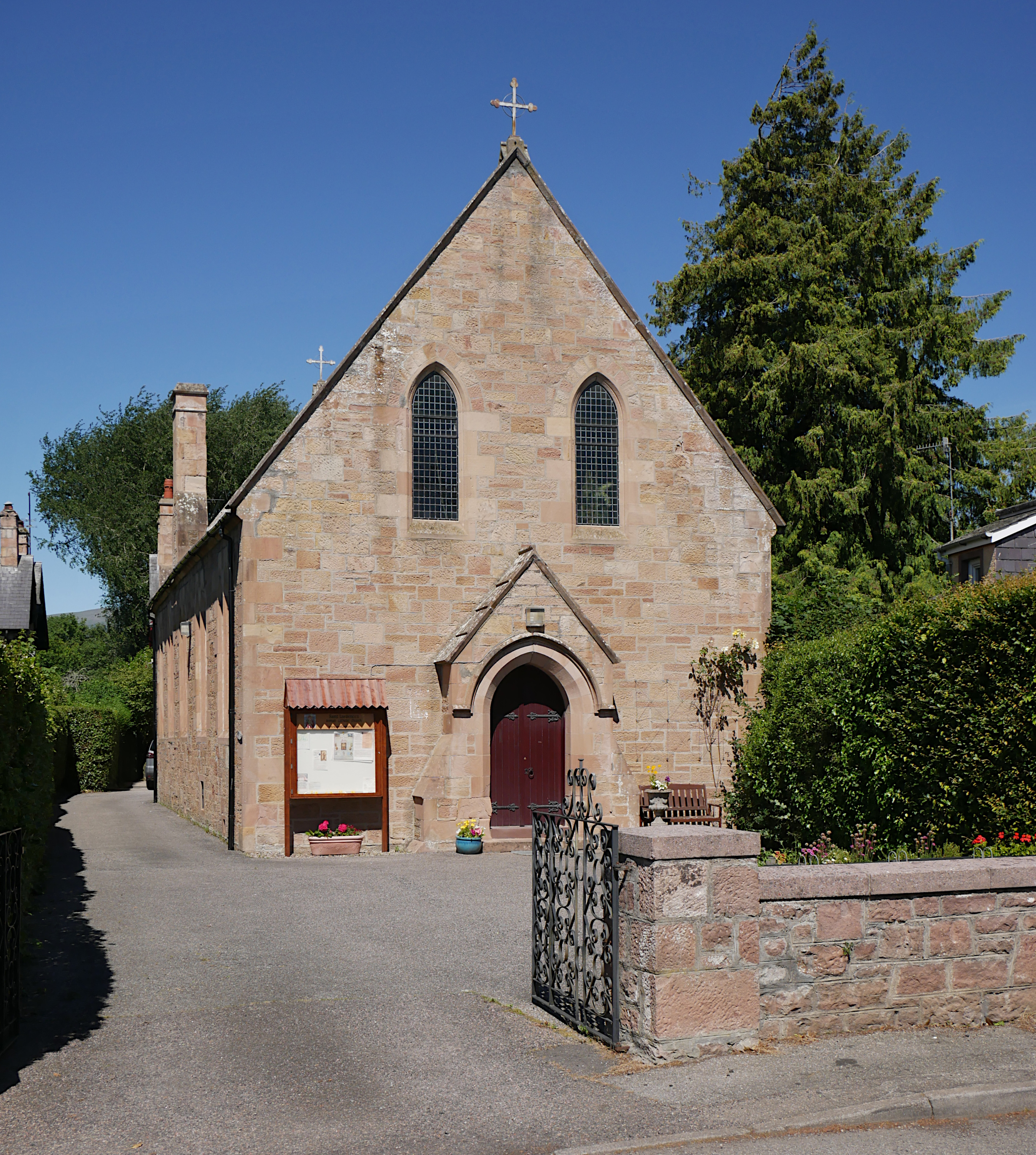
- St. Lawrence's Church, Dingwall
- Location: Dingwall, Ross-Shire
- Country: Scotland
- Denomination: Roman Catholic
- Website: Official website

History
- Status: Parish church

Architecture
- Functional status: Active
- Architect: William C Joass
- Architectural type: Church
- Style: Gothic
- Completed: 1902

Administration
- Diocese: Aberdeen
- Deanery: St. Joseph's

Clergy
- Priest: Fr Andrzej Niski

St. Lawrence's Church, Dingwall is a Roman Catholic church in the town of Dingwall, Ross-shire, in Scotland and is a part of the RC Diocese of Aberdeen. The building is significant for the high quality of its stained glass windows and carved woodwork.

== History ==
The church was opened on 29 July 1902. The chief subscriber was Mr Duncan Chisholm of Pitglassie. The church contains stained glass windows depicting St Jude, St Lawrence and St Anthony by Dom Ninian Sloane of Pluscarden Abbey. Also of note are the detailed carved shrine surrounds by Brother Auer of Fort Augustus Abbey whose brother was a parish priest of the church in the 1930s.
