= 1902 in the United Kingdom =

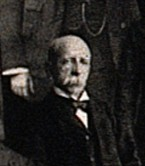

Events from the year 1902 in the United Kingdom.

== Incumbents ==
- Monarch – Edward VII
- Prime Minister - Robert Gascoyne-Cecil, 3rd Marquess of Salisbury (Coalition) (until 11 July), Arthur Balfour (Coalition) (starting 11 July)

== Events ==
- January – the General Post Office becomes the world's first postal administration to accept divided-back postcards (i.e. those with an address and message on one side and a full-size picture on the other), initiating a craze for sending and collecting them.
- 5 January – first performance, privately, of George Bernard Shaw's controversial 1893 play Mrs. Warren's Profession in London.
- 17 January – The Times Literary Supplement first published.
- 30 January – the Anglo-Japanese Alliance is signed in London ending Japan's policy of "splendid isolation".
- 13 February – the 1902 World Figure Skating Championships held in London.
- 7 March – Second Boer War: South African Boers win their last battle over British forces, with the capture of a British general and 200 of his men.
- 2 April – first performance of William Butler Yeats's play Cathleen Ní Houlihan in Dublin.
- 5 April – the first Ibrox disaster: a stand at Ibrox Stadium in Glasgow collapses during an England versus Scotland football match. 25 people die and 517 are injured.
- 26 April – Hibernian F.C. win the Scottish F.A. Cup, a feat they will not repeat until 2016.
- 28 April – Manchester United Football Club is formed by John Henry Davies in a name change from Newton Heath, the Football League Second Division club that he recently saved from going out of business.
- April – Vladimir Lenin (under the alias Jacob Richter) begins a year's stay in London where he edits the newspaper Iskra, studies in the British Museum Reading Room and in October first meets Leon Trotsky.
- 22 May – the White Star Liner SS Ionic is launched by Harland and Wolff in Belfast.
- 29 May – the London School of Economics is opened.
- 31 May – Treaty of Vereeniging signed by the United Kingdom, the South African Republic and the Republic of the Orange Free State bringing the Second Boer War to an end.
- 2 June – Land of Hope and Glory (with music by Edward Elgar and lyrics by A. C. Benson) receives its London premiere, sung by Clara Butt.
- 17 June – Norwich City F.C. formed as an amateur club, playing its first match on 6 September.
- 26 June
  - Scheduled date for the Coronation of Edward VII and Alexandra, postponed due to the King's appendicitis.
  - Edward VII institutes The Order of Merit, an order bestowed personally by the British monarch on up to 24 distinguished Empire recipients.
- 30 June–11 August – a conference held in London supports the principle of Imperial Preference, a system of reciprocally-levelled tariffs or Free trade agreements between different Dominions and colonies within the British Empire.
- 11 July – retirement of Lord Salisbury as Prime Minister due to ill health. He is succeeded by his nephew Arthur Balfour and will be the last person to have sat in the House of Lords throughout his term as Prime Minister.
- 22 July – Cremation Act allows burial authorities to establish crematoria with effect from 1 April 1903.
- 9 August – coronation of Edward VII and Alexandra at Westminster Abbey by Archbishop Frederick Temple.
- 13 September – Harry Jackson becomes the first British person to be convicted on the basis of fingerprint evidence.
- 1 October – in the Royal Navy:
  - launch of its first submarine, HMS Holland 1, at Barrow-in-Furness.
  - establishment of the Home Fleet.
- 16 October – the first Borstal youth detention centre is opened at Borstal, Kent.
- 4 November – first performance of J. M. Barrie's play The Admirable Crichton in London.
- 8 December – Committee of Imperial Defence first meets.
- 9 December – British and German forces seize the navy of Venezuela in a dispute over compensation claims.
- 10 December – Ronald Ross wins the Nobel Prize in Physiology or Medicine "for his work on malaria, by which he has shown how it enters the organism and thereby has laid the foundation for successful research on this disease and methods of combating it".
- 18 December – the Balfour Education Act replaces School Boards by a system of Local Education Authorities in England and Wales and permits them to build and maintain secondary schools and deliver teacher training; also provides for rate aid for teacher salaries in voluntary schools.
- 30 December – Discovery Expedition: Scott, Shackleton and Wilson reach the furthest southern point reached thus far by man, south of 82°S.

=== Undated ===
- Oliver Heaviside proposes existence of the Kennelly–Heaviside layer.
- William Bayliss and Ernest Starling make the first discovery of a hormone, secretin.
- The British Army adopts a dark khaki serge Service Dress, replacing the traditional red coat for regular wear; the style will remain standard issue until 1939.
- Marmite first produced, in Burton upon Trent.
- Will Barker founds Ealing Studios.
- Edible dormouse begins invasion of an area of the Chilterns having escaped from Walter Rothschild's private collection.

== Publications ==
- Edward Harold Begbie's political satire Clara in Blunderland (under the pen name Caroline Lewis).
- Arnold Bennett's novels Anna of the Five Towns and The Grand Babylon Hotel.
- Joseph Conrad's novella Heart of Darkness (in book form).
- Walter de la Mare's first poetry collection Songs of Childhood (under the pen name 'Walter Ramal').
- Arthur Conan Doyle's Sherlock Holmes novel The Hound of the Baskervilles.
- John A. Hobson's book Imperialism.
- W. W. Jacobs' short story collection The Lady of the Barge, including "The Monkey's Paw".
- Henry James's novel The Wings of the Dove.
- Rudyard Kipling's Just So Stories and short story "Below the Mill Dam".
- John Masefield's Salt-Water Ballads, including "Sea-Fever".
- A. E. W. Mason's historical adventure novel The Four Feathers.
- E. Nesbit's children's novel Five Children and It.
- Beatrix Potter's children's book The Tale of Peter Rabbit with her own colour illustrations.
- W. Heath Robinson's children's book The Adventures of Uncle Lubin with his own illustrations.
- Saki's work The Westminster Alice.
- The Times Literary Supplement.

== Births ==
- 5 January – Stella Gibbons, novelist, journalist, poet and short-story writer (died 1989)
- 11 January – Evelyn Dove, singer (died 1987)
- 16 January – Eric Liddell, runner and missionary, in China (died 1945 in China)
- 21 January – Webster Booth, tenor (died 1984)
- January – Billy Pigg, Northumbrian piper (died 1968)
- 3 February – Joseph Bentwich, British-born Israeli educator (died 1982)
- 4 February – Hartley Shawcross, prosecutor at the Nuremberg trials (died 2003)
- 8 February – Anne Parsons, English socialite (died 1992)
- 21 February – Arthur Nock, English classicist, theologian, and Harvard University professor (died 1963)
- 28 March – Dame Flora Robson, English actress (died 1984)
- 29 March – William Walton, English composer (died 1983)
- 30 March – Ted Heath, bandleader (died 1969)
- 8 April
  - Andrew Irvine, mountaineer (died 1924 on Mount Everest)
  - Arthur Wellard, cricketer (died 1980)
- 9 April – Lord David Cecil, literary critic and biographer (died 1986)
- 20 April – Donald Wolfit, actor-manager (died 1968)
- 22 April – Megan Lloyd George, Welsh politician (died 1966)
- 1 May – Sonnie Hale, actor, singer and director (died 1959)
- 2 May – Brian Aherne, actor (died 1986 in the United States)
- 10 May – Ian Richmond, Roman archaeologist (died 1965)
- 18 May – Phyllis Barclay-Smith, ornithologist (died 1980)
- 27 May – Peter Marshall, Scottish-born preacher, 57th Chaplain of the United States Senate (died 1949)
- 31 May – Billy Mayerl, pianist and light music composer (died 1959)
- 4 June – Harry Beck, graphic designer, creator of the London Underground map (died 1974)
- 17 June – F. F. E. Yeo-Thomas, secret agent (died 1964 in France)
- 18 June – Morgan Phillips, Welsh politician (died 1963)
- 29 June – Ellen Pollock, character actress (died 1997)
- 24 July
  - Renée Houston, née Katherina Houston Gribbin, Scottish comedy actress (died 1980)
  - Nora Swinburne, actress (died 2000)
- 28 July – Roger Fleetwood-Hesketh, soldier and politician (died 1987)
- 8 August – Paul Dirac, physicist, Nobel Prize laureate (died 1984 in the United States)
- 12 August – Jack de Leon, Panamanian-born theatre manager, impresario and playwright (died 1956)
- 16 August
  - Evelyn Colyer, tennis player (died 1930)
  - Georgette Heyer, novelist (died 1974)
- 19 August – Fyfe Robertson, Scottish television presenter (died 1987)
- 4 September – Lorna Johnstone, equestrian (died 1990)
- 20 September – Stevie Smith, poet and novelist (died 1971)
- 21 September – Allen Lane, publisher (died 1970)
- 17 October – Melford Stevenson, judge (died 1987)
- 26 October – Beryl Markham, aviator and author (died 1986 in Kenya)
- 28 October – Elsa Lanchester, actress (died 1986 in the United States)
- 9 November – Anthony Asquith, film director (died 1968)
- 27 November – George Camsell, footballer (died 1966)
- 8 December – Jack Solomons, boxing promoter (died 1979)
- 15 December – Mary Skeaping, choreographer (died 1984)
- 19 December – Ralph Richardson, actor (died 1983)
- 20 December – Prince George, Duke of Kent (died 1942)

== Deaths ==
- 11 January
  - Johnny Briggs, cricketer (born 1862)
  - James James, harpist and composer of the Welsh national anthem (born 1833)
- 17 February – Charles Alexander, cricketer (born 1847)
- 18 February – Sigismund Koelle, missionary (born 1820 in Germany)
- 26 February – Edward Henry Cooper, army officer and politician (born 1827)
- 15 March – Sir Richard Temple, 1st Baronet, colonial administrator (born 1826)
- 26 March – Cecil Rhodes, imperialist (born 1853)
- 29 March – Sir Andrew Clarke, army officer and colonial governor (born 1824)
- 8 April – John Wodehouse, 1st Earl of Kimberley, politician (born 1826)
- 18 June – Samuel Butler, novelist (born 1835)
- 6 September – Sir Frederick Abel, chemist (born 1827)
- 29 September – William McGonagall, Scottish doggerel 'poet and tragedian' (born 1825)
- 4 October – Lionel Johnson, poet, essayist and critic (born 1867)
- 5 October – Henry Lascelles Carr, newspaper proprietor (born 1844)
- 12 November – William Henry Barlow, railway civil engineer (born 1812)
- 16 November – G. A. Henty, historical novelist (born 1832)
- 17 November – Hugh Price Hughes, Welsh-born Methodist social reformer (born 1847)
- 23 December – Frederick Temple, Archbishop of Canterbury (born 1821)
