= Dingwall =

Town in Highland, Scotland

Coordinates: 57.597°N 4.428°W

Dingwall: Scottish Gaelic: Inbhir Pheofharain; Scots: Dingwal
- Market town and royal burgh
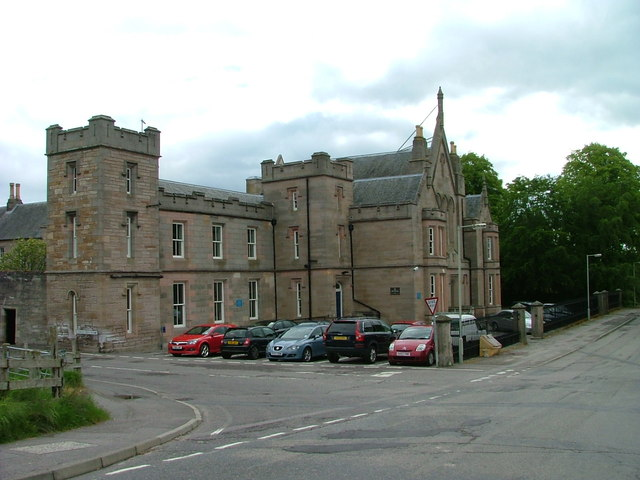
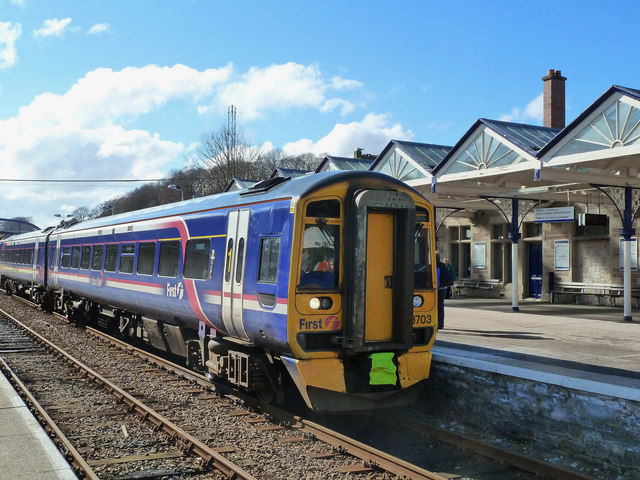
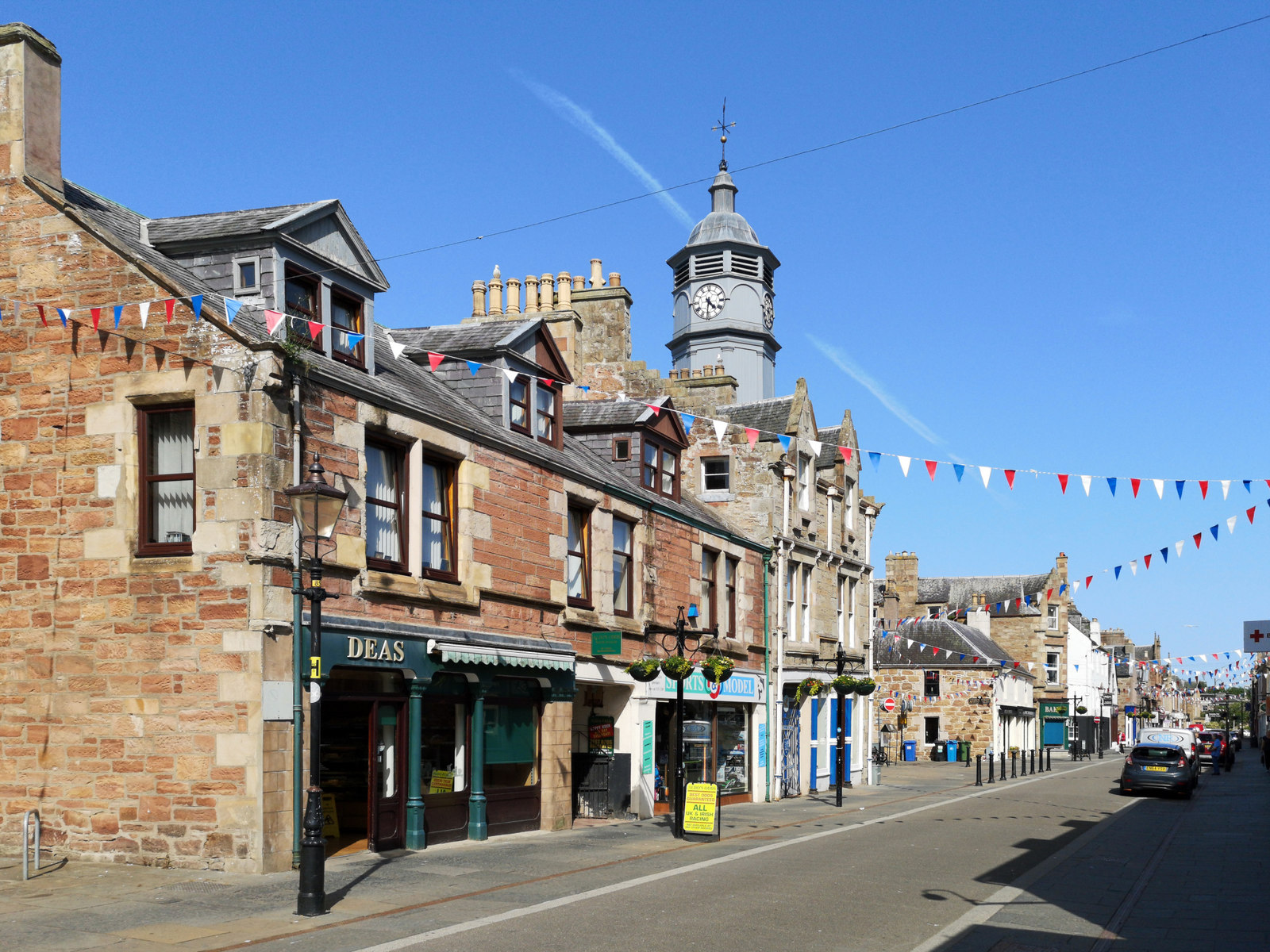
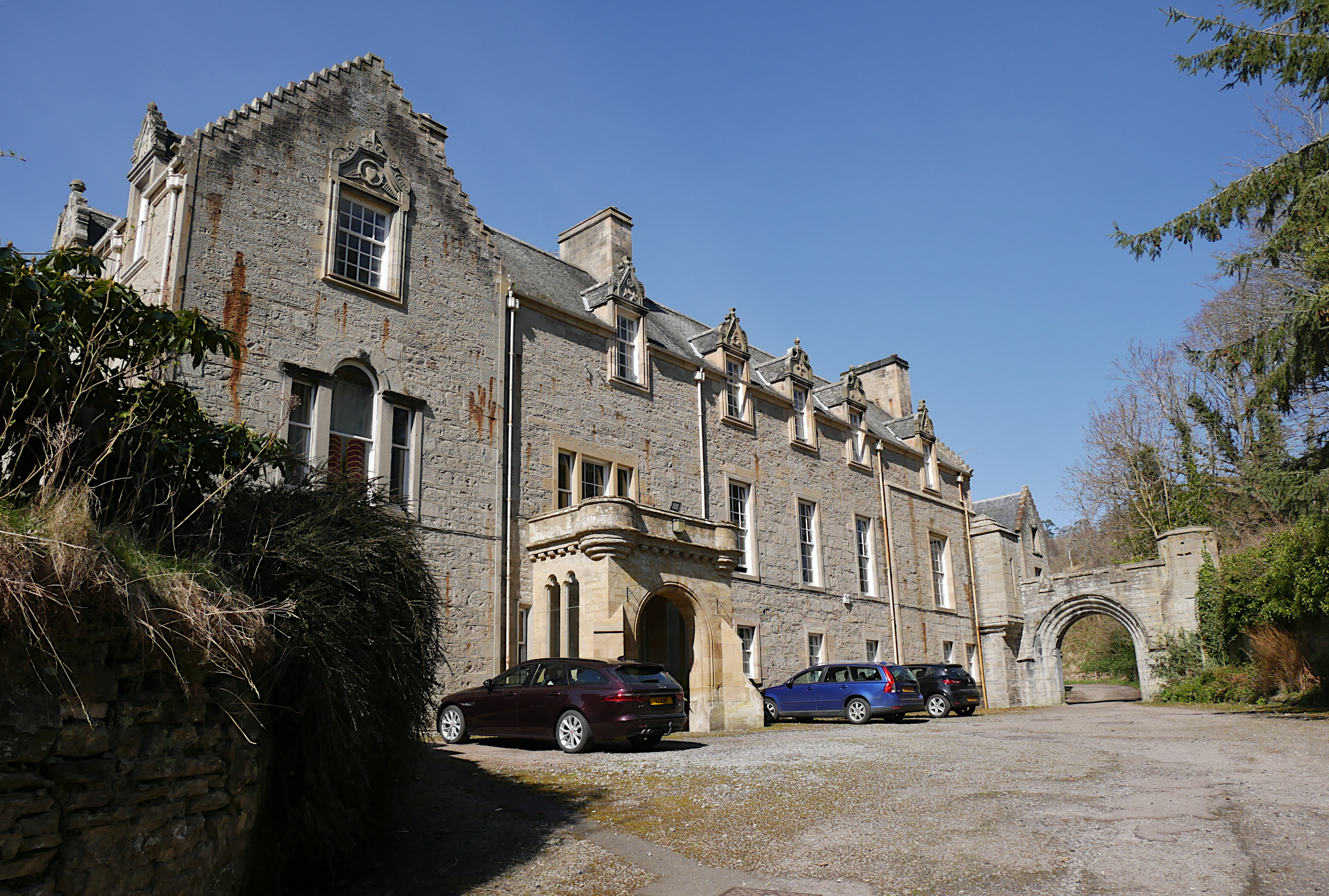
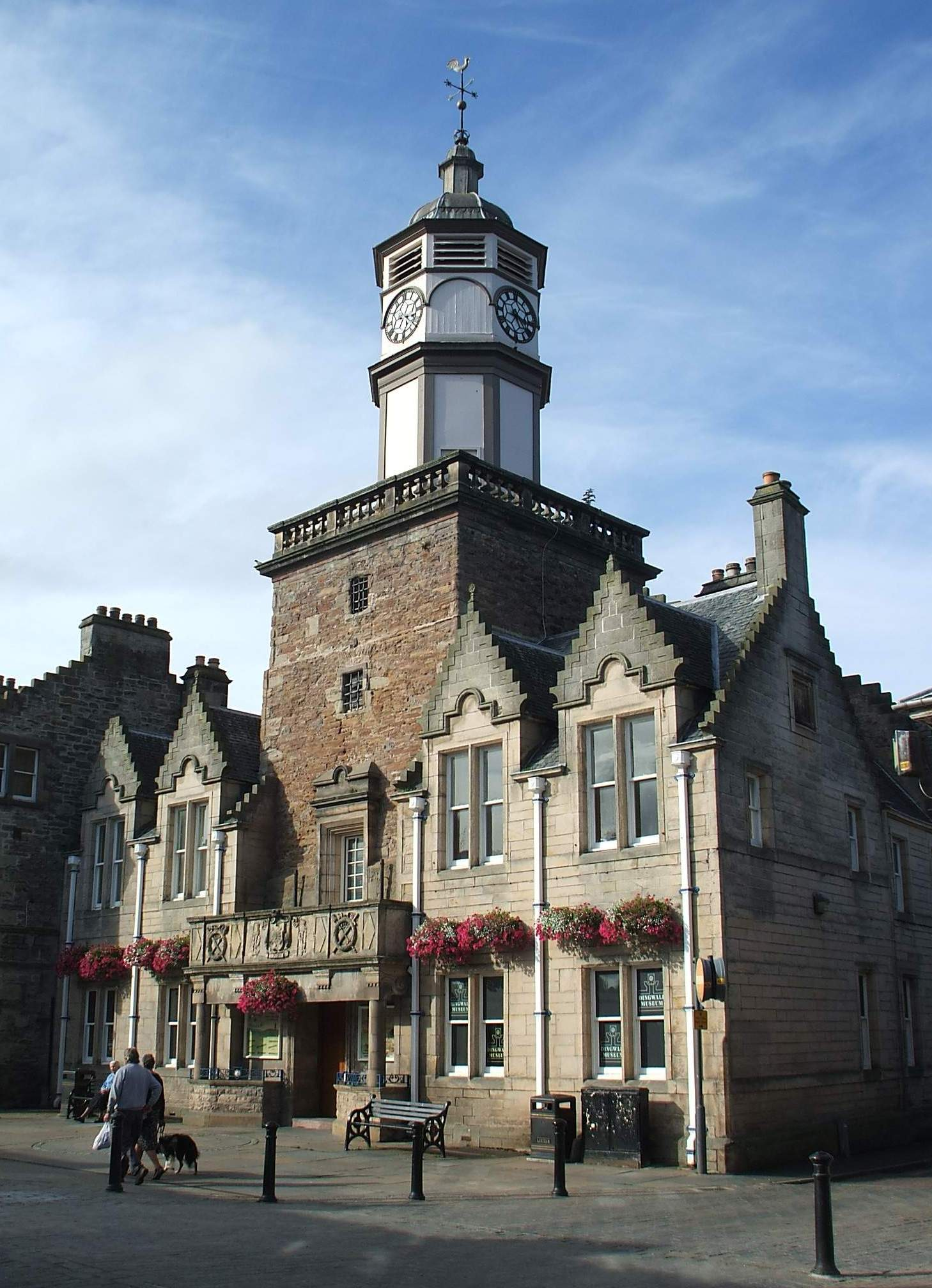
- Sheriff Court Railway station Dingwall High Street Tulloch Castle Town Hall

- Location within the Ross and Cromarty area
- Population: 5,265 (2022)
- OS grid reference: NH550587
  - Edinburgh: 122 mi (196 km)
  - London: 453 mi (729 km)
- Council area: Highland
- Lieutenancy area: Ross and Cromarty
- Country: Scotland
- Sovereign state: United Kingdom
- Post town: Dingwall
- Postcode district: IV7, IV15, IV16
- Dialling code: 01349
- Police: Scotland
- Fire: Scottish
- Ambulance: Scottish
- UK Parliament: Caithness, Sutherland and Easter Ross
- Scottish Parliament: Skye, Lochaber and Badenoch
- Website: www.dingwallcc.com

Dingwall (Scots: Dingwal, Scottish Gaelic: Inbhir Pheofharain [ˈiɲɪɾʲ ˈfjɔhəɾɛɲ]) is a historic market town and former royal burgh on the Cromarty Firth in Easter Ross in the Highlands of Scotland. It has enjoyed the status of royal burgh since the 13th century, and its local government is the Highland Council. The town has a population of 5,265 in 2022, and though today it lies inland, its topography used to be that of an east-coast harbour. At one time, it was a significant medieval port, a hub of foreign trading and customs collection. Dingwall's medieval history affirms its status as an important country town and administrative centre, an extension perhaps of its history as a Viking settlement as evidenced by the Norse origin (Þingvǫllr) of its name.

The royal burgh is also the site of historic castles and clan skirmishes. Dingwall Castle was once the biggest castle north of Stirling. On the town's present-day outskirts lies Tulloch Castle, parts of which may date back to the 12th century. In 1411 the Battle of Dingwall is said to have taken place between the Clan Mackay and the Clan Donald.

== History ==
=== Early history ===
Its name, derived from the Scandinavian Þingvǫllr (field or meeting-place of the thing, or local assembly; compare Tynwald, Tingwall, Thingwall in the British Isles alone, plus many others across northern Europe such as the Icelandic Þingvellir, which is the grammatical plural of the same word), preserves the Viking connections of the town; Gaels call it Inbhir Pheofharain (pronounced [iɲɪɾʲˈfjɔhəɾɛɲ]), meaning "the mouth of the Peffery" or Baile Chàil meaning "cabbage town".

The site of the Þingvǫllr, and of the medieval Moothill, thought to have been established by the Vikings after they invaded in the 8th century, lies beneath the Cromartie memorial.

=== Early Middle Ages ===
In the early Middle Ages Dingwall Castle, which was established in the 11th century, was reputed to have been the largest castle north of Stirling. King Alexander II created Dingwall a royal burgh in 1226, the burgh becoming the seat of the Earls of Ross. James IV renewed its royal burgh charter in 1497. On the top of Knockfarrel (Scottish Gaelic: Cnoc Fhearghalaigh), a hill about three miles (five kilometres) to the west, stands a large and very complete vitrified fort with ramparts.

An obelisk, 51 feet (16 m) high, was erected over the grave of George Mackenzie, 1st Earl of Cromartie, near the parish church of St Clement after he died in 1717. It was affected by subsidence, becoming known as the "Leaning Tower", and was later replaced by a much smaller replica. Dingwall Town Hall, which dates back to 1745, still survives.

On 6 August 1904 a large memorial to the Seaforth Highlanders killed in the Boer War was unveiled in Dingwall. It is a 24 feet (7.3 m) high Ionic cross in pale pink granite. The Ferry Road drill hall was completed in 1910. Dingwall formerly served as the county town of Ross and Cromarty: the headquarters of Ross and Cromarty County Council, established in 1889, was County Buildings in Dingwall.

James Gillanders of Highfield Cottage near Dingwall, was the factor for the estate of Major Charles Robertson of Kincardine and, as his employer was then serving with the British Army in Australia, Gillanders was the person most responsible for the mass evictions staged at Glencalvie, Ross-shire in 1845, part of the Highland Clearances. A Gaelic-language poem denouncing Gillanders for the brutality of the evictions was later submitted anonymously to Pàdraig MacNeacail, the editor of the Canadian Gaelic column in which the poem was later published in the Nova Scotia newspaper The Casket. The poem, which is believed either to be or to draw upon eyewitness accounts, is believed to be the only Gaelic language source of information relating to the evictions in Glencalvie.

=== Recent history ===
As a result of storms in late October 2006, Dingwall was subject to widespread flooding the aftermath of which left the town and much of the Highlands north of Inverness, including the A9 and Far North Line, cut off for a time In August 2019 the town was once again flooded.

== Location ==
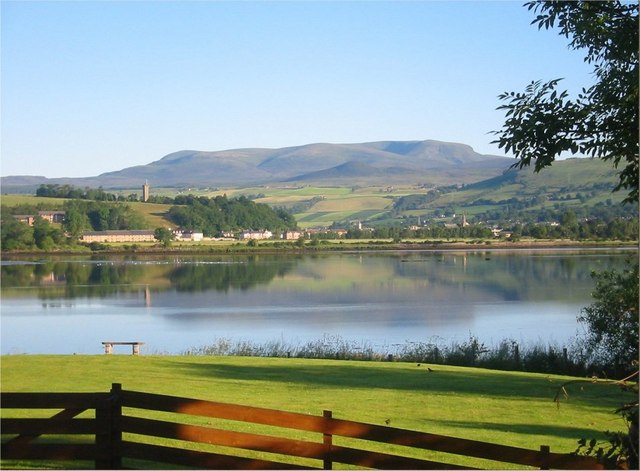
View over Dingwall to Ben Wyvis

Dingwall lies near the head of the Cromarty Firth where the valley of the Peffery unites with the alluvial lands at the mouth of the Conon, 14 miles (23 km) northwest of Inverness. The town contains a particularly short canal, the Dingwall Canal, also known locally as the River Peffery. Dingwall railway station has been on what is now called the Far North Line since about 1865. It also serves the Kyle of Lochalsh Line.

Dingwall is on the former main road route to the north Highlands (A9). Since the completion of the Cromarty Bridge in 1979, the main road has bypassed Dingwall. Heading west, the A834 joins the A835 road which is the main route to the north west Highlands, including Ullapool.

== Sport ==
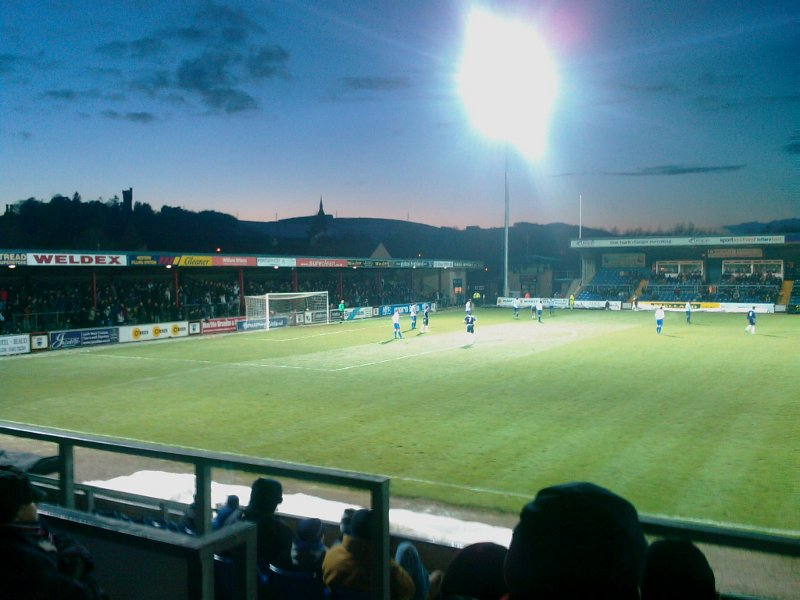
Victoria Park Stadium

Dingwall is the home of football team Ross County, who won promotion to the Scottish Premier League in 2012, finished the 2012–13 season in fifth place and currently play in the Scottish League One. Despite the town's small population, Ross County attract sizeable crowds to Victoria Park from across the whole surrounding area. The team reached the 2010 Scottish Cup Final, having knocked out Celtic in the previous round. Ross County won their first piece of major silverware in 2016, winning the Scottish League Cup by beating Hibernian 2–1 in the final.

== Media ==
Television signals are received from the Rosemarkie TV transmitter and the local relay transmitter in Fodderty.

The town is served by the local newspaper, Ross-shire Journal, and Inverness-based local radio station MFR Radio.

== Education ==
Dingwall has a primary school, Dingwall Primary, serving the town.

Dingwall Academy is the secondary school serving the town and the wider area, including communities such as Strathpeffer, Contin, Conon Bridge, Maryburgh and Muir of Ord.

Dingwall is also home to Fèis Rois, a centre for education in Gaelic and traditional music and culture.

The Highland Theological College is located within the town, housed in a former Scottish Hydro Electric office. It is part of the University of the Highlands and Islands. Its focus is upon Theological Education, and is an accredited university for training Church of Scotland and United Free Church ministers and workers.

== Parliamentary burgh ==
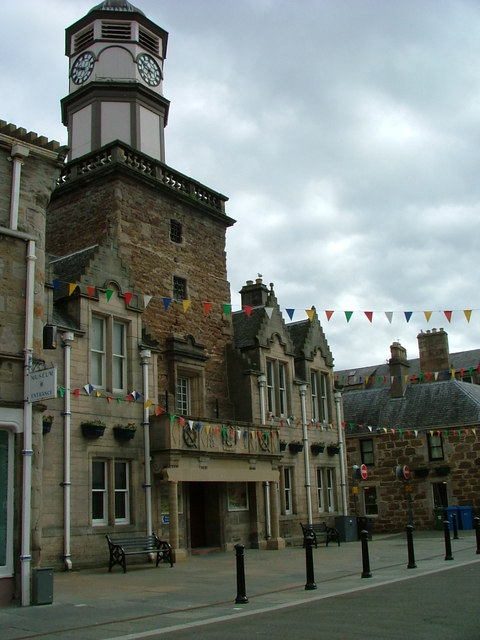
Dingwall Town Hall

Dingwall was a parliamentary burgh, combined with Dornoch, Kirkwall, Tain and Wick in the Northern Burghs constituency of the House of Commons of the Parliament of Great Britain from 1708 to 1801 and of the Parliament of the United Kingdom from 1801 to 1918. Cromarty was added to the list in 1832. The constituency was a district of burghs known also as Tain Burghs until 1832, and then as Wick Burghs.

It was represented by one Member of Parliament (MP). In 1918 the constituency was abolished and the Dingwall component was merged into the county constituency of Ross and Cromarty which was itself abolished in 1983.

== Religion ==
Churches include:

- Dingwall and Strathpeffer Free Church of Scotland
- Dingwall Baptist Church
- Dingwall: Castle Street Church of Scotland
- Dingwall Evangelical Church
- Dingwall: Free Presbyterian Church of Scotland, opened in the mid/late 1890s, current building 1959.
- Dingwall: St Clement's Church of Scotland
- St James the Great Scottish Episcopal Church
- St Lawrence's Church, Roman Catholic Church, opened in 1902.

== Notable people ==
- James Fraser of Brea theologian and prisoner on the Bass Rock
- Prof James Alexander MacDonald (1908–1997) botanist, born and raised in Dingwall.
- Major General Sir Hector Archibald MacDonald, Son of a local Crofter at Rootfield, Dingwall.
- John M'Gilligen of Fodderty who held conventicles in houses throughout the county
- John Kennedy of Dingwall, Free Church of Scotland minister
- Rev Duncan Leitch, Moderator of the General Assembly of the Free Church of Scotland in 1952
- Julie Fowlis, a folk singer and multi-instrumentalist
- Kate Forbes, Deputy First Minister of Scotland and member of the Scottish Parliament for Skye, Lochaber and Badenoch, was born and went to school in Dingwall.
- Thomas Simpson (explorer), Arctic explorer and accused murderer (1808–1840)
- Willie Logan, civil engineer and founder of aviation company Loganair
- Colin Calder, founder of the Club Atletico Rosario Central - Argentina on 24 December 1889
